= Loubersan =

- Commune
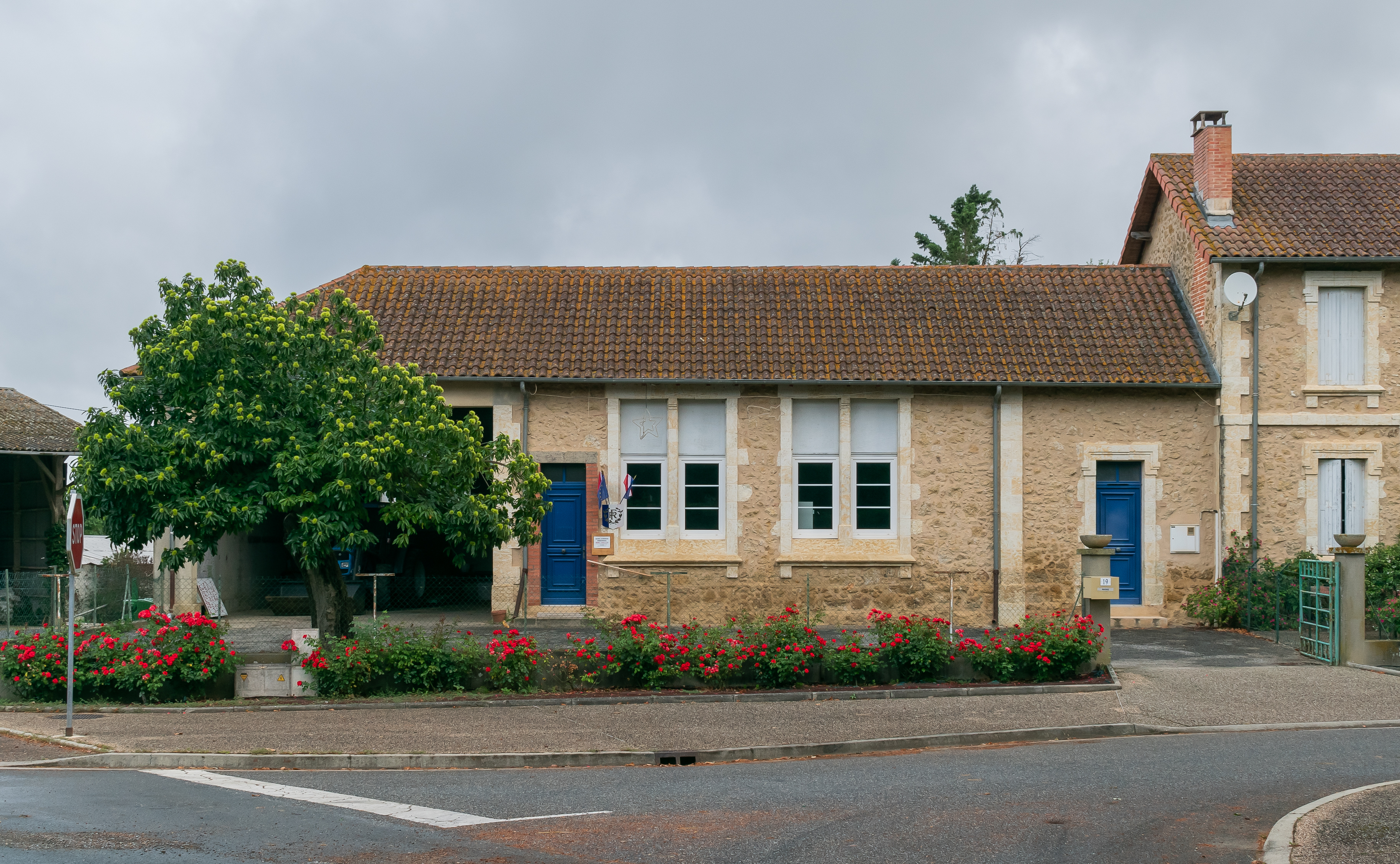
- Town hall of Loubersan
- Location of Loubersan
- Location within France Location within Occitanie
- Coordinates: 43°29′52″N 0°29′59″E
- Country: France
- Region: Occitania
- Department: Gers
- Arrondissement: Mirande
- Canton: Mirande-Astarac

Government
  - Mayor (2020–2026): Philippe Baron
- Area^{1}: 10.77 km^{2} (4.16 sq mi)
- Elevation: 275 m (902 ft)
- Highest elevation: 272 m (892 ft)
- Lowest elevation: 171 m (561 ft)
- Population (2023): 162
  - Density: 15.0/km^{2} (39.0/sq mi)
- Time zone: UTC+01:00 (CET)
  - Summer (DST): UTC+02:00 (CEST)
- INSEE/Postal code: 32215 /32300
- ^{1} French Land Register data, which excludes lakes, ponds, glaciers > 1 km^{2} (0.386 sq mi or 247 acres) and river estuaries.

Loubersan (French pronunciation: [lubɛʁsɑ̃]; Occitan: Lobersan) is a commune in the Gers department in southwestern France.

== Geography ==
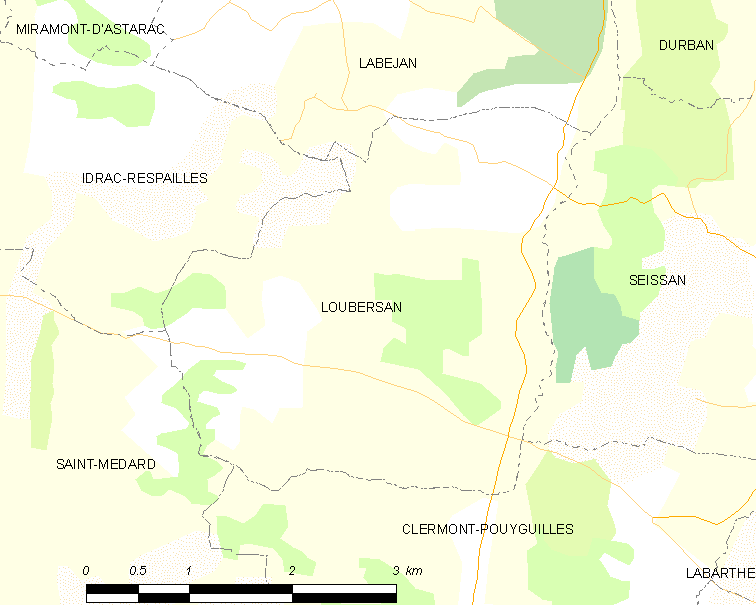
Loubersan and its surrounding communes

== Population ==
Historical population
Year	Pop.	±% p.a.
1968	189	—
1975	153	−2.97%
1982	184	+2.67%
1990	165	−1.35%
1999	168	+0.20%
2007	182	+1.01%
2012	172	−1.12%
2017	152	−2.44%
2023	162	+1.07%
Source: INSEE

== See also ==
- Communes of the Gers department
