= Aux-Aussat =

- Commune
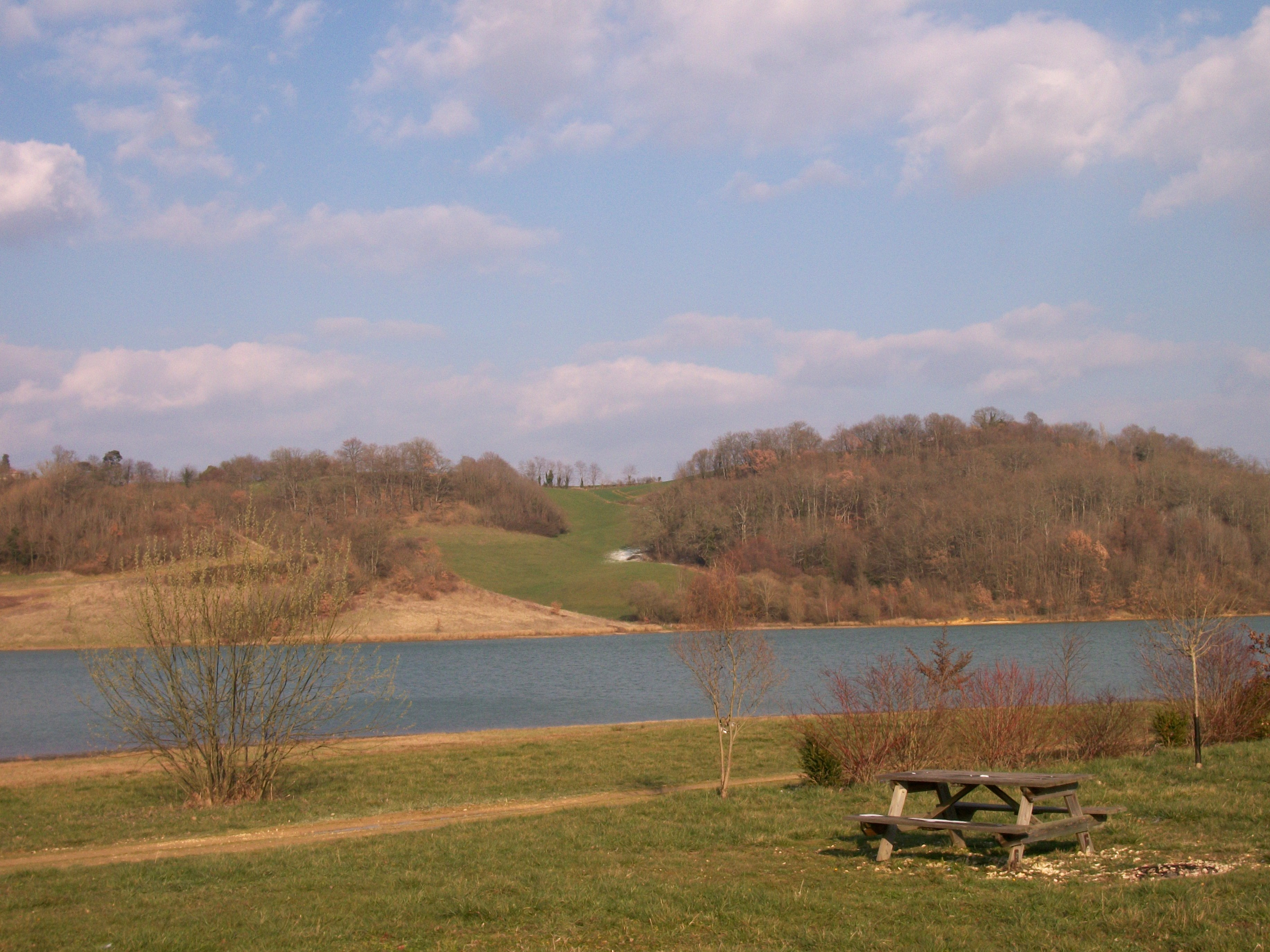
- Reservoir of Cabournieu

- Coat of arms
- Location of Aux-Aussat
- Location within France Location within Occitanie
- Coordinates: 43°26′14″N 0°16′18″E
- Country: France
- Region: Occitania
- Department: Gers
- Arrondissement: Mirande
- Canton: Mirande-Astarac
- Intercommunality: CC Astarac Arros Gascogne

Government
  - Mayor (2020–2026): Michel Esterez
- Area^{1}: 12.61 km^{2} (4.87 sq mi)
- Elevation: 216 m (709 ft)
- Highest elevation: 342 m (1,122 ft)
- Lowest elevation: 189 m (620 ft)
- Population (2023): 269
  - Density: 21.3/km^{2} (55.3/sq mi)
- Time zone: UTC+01:00 (CET)
  - Summer (DST): UTC+02:00 (CEST)
- INSEE/Postal code: 32020 /32170
- ^{1} French Land Register data, which excludes lakes, ponds, glaciers > 1 km^{2} (0.386 sq mi or 247 acres) and river estuaries.

Aux-Aussat is a commune in the Gers department in southwestern France.

== Geography ==
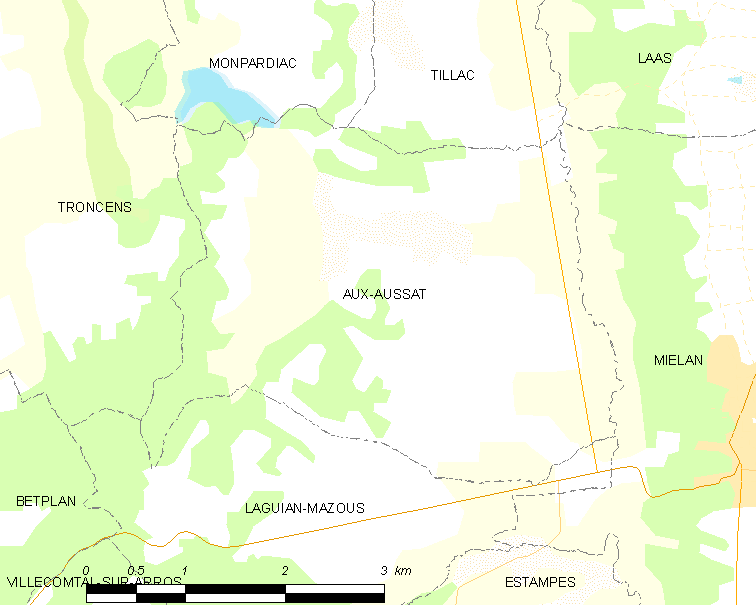
Aux-Aussat and its surrounding communes

== Population ==
Historical population
Year	Pop.	±% p.a.
1968	297	—
1975	245	−2.71%
1982	228	−1.02%
1990	201	−1.56%
1999	201	+0.00%
2007	246	+2.56%
2012	263	+1.35%
2017	275	+0.90%
2023	269	−0.37%
Source: INSEE

== See also ==
- Communes of the Gers department
