= Ponsampère =

- Commune
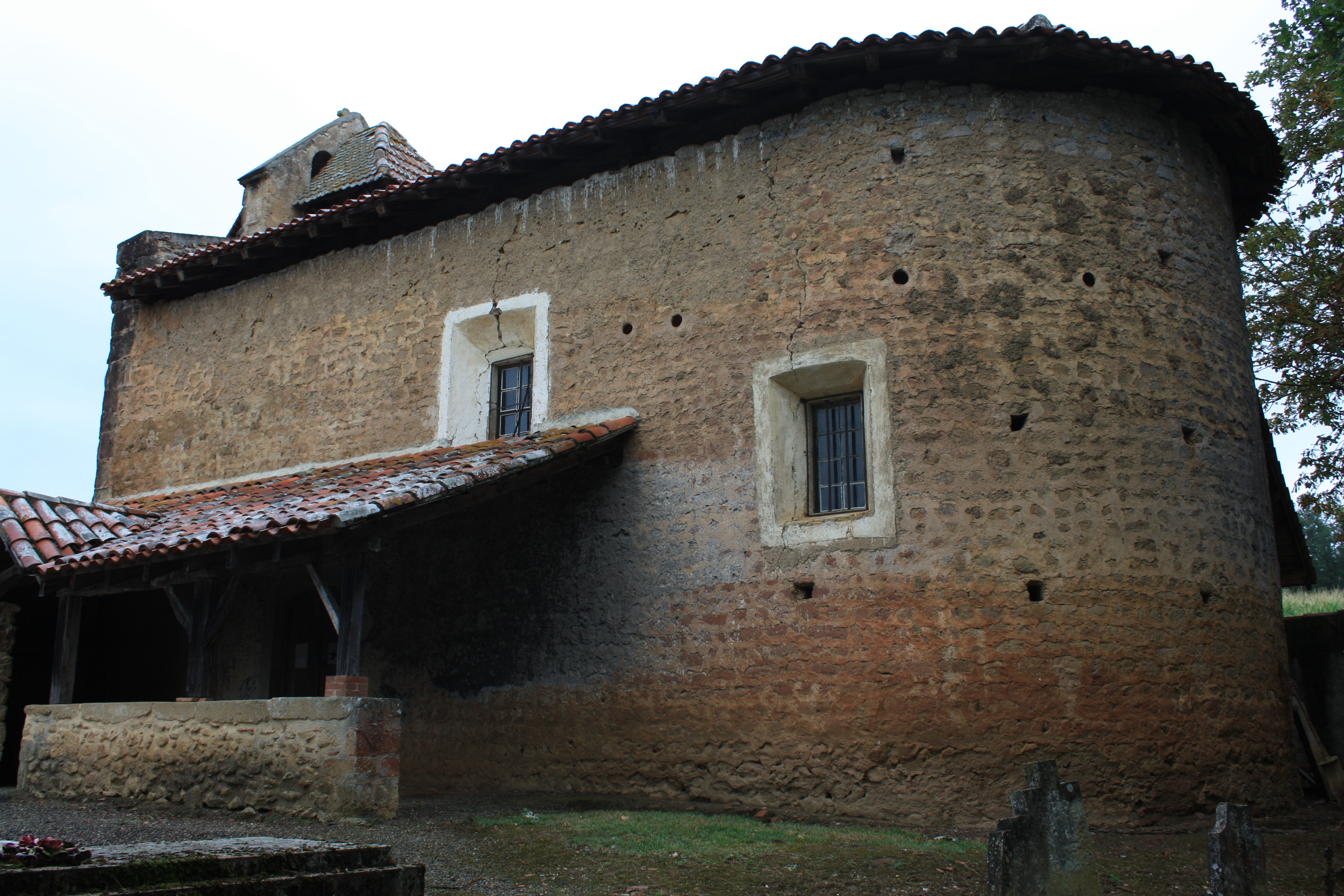
- The church in Ponsampère
- Location of Ponsampère
- Location within France Location within Occitanie
- Coordinates: 43°27′23″N 0°22′39″E
- Country: France
- Region: Occitania
- Department: Gers
- Arrondissement: Mirande
- Canton: Mirande-Astarac

Government
  - Mayor (2020–2026): Laurence Soriano
- Area^{1}: 8.9 km^{2} (3.4 sq mi)
- Elevation: 162 m (531 ft)
- Highest elevation: 295 m (968 ft)
- Lowest elevation: 176 m (577 ft)
- Population (2023): 98
  - Density: 11/km^{2} (29/sq mi)
- Time zone: UTC+01:00 (CET)
  - Summer (DST): UTC+02:00 (CEST)
- INSEE/Postal code: 32323 /32300
- ^{1} French Land Register data, which excludes lakes, ponds, glaciers > 1 km^{2} (0.386 sq mi or 247 acres) and river estuaries.

Ponsampère (French pronunciation: [pɔ̃sɑ̃pɛʁ]; Occitan: Ponsan Pera) is a commune in the Gers department in southwestern France.

== Geography ==
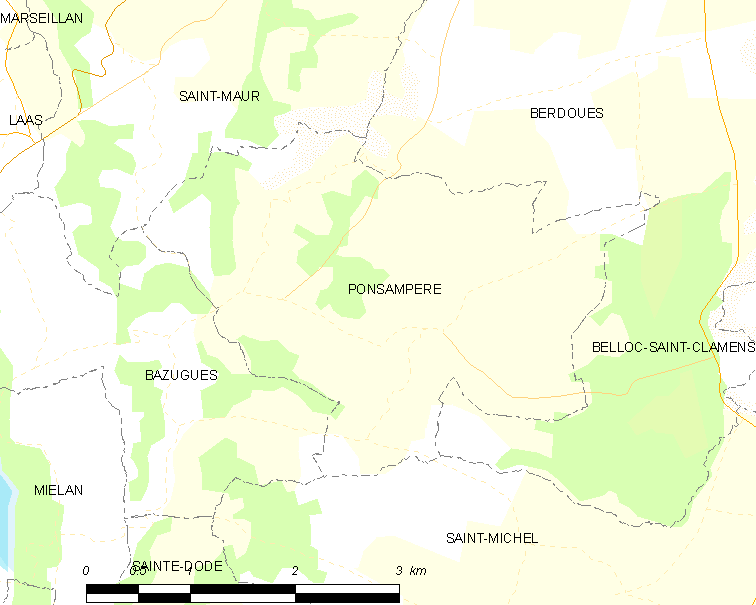
Ponsampère and its surrounding communes

== Population ==
Historical population
Year	Pop.	±% p.a.
1968	109	—
1975	107	−0.26%
1982	103	−0.54%
1990	110	+0.83%
1999	118	+0.78%
2007	115	−0.32%
2012	115	+0.00%
2017	126	+1.84%
2023	98	−4.10%
Source: INSEE

== See also ==
- Communes of the Gers department
