= Labéjan =

- Commune
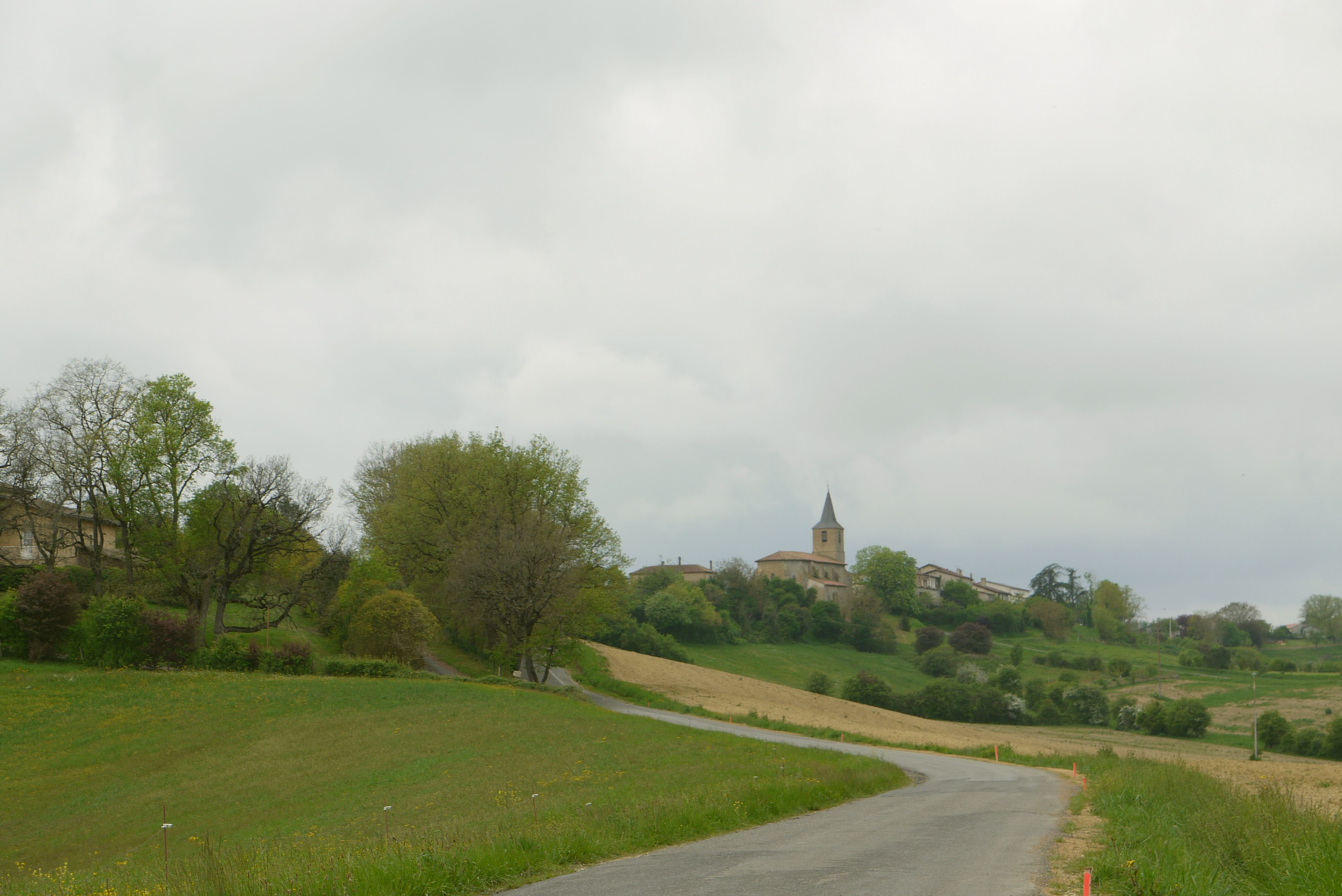
- A general view of Labéjan

- Coat of arms
- Location of Labéjan
- Location within France Location within Occitanie
- Coordinates: 43°32′21″N 0°30′03″E
- Country: France
- Region: Occitania
- Department: Gers
- Arrondissement: Mirande
- Canton: Mirande-Astarac

Government
  - Mayor (2020–2026): Sylvie Lahille
- Area^{1}: 18.71 km^{2} (7.22 sq mi)
- Elevation: 266 m (873 ft)
- Highest elevation: 273 m (896 ft)
- Lowest elevation: 156 m (512 ft)
- Population (2023): 290
  - Density: 15/km^{2} (40/sq mi)
- Time zone: UTC+01:00 (CET)
  - Summer (DST): UTC+02:00 (CEST)
- INSEE/Postal code: 32172 /32300
- ^{1} French Land Register data, which excludes lakes, ponds, glaciers > 1 km^{2} (0.386 sq mi or 247 acres) and river estuaries.

Labéjan (French pronunciation: [labeʒɑ̃]; Occitan: Labejan) is a commune in the Gers department in southwestern France.

== Geography ==
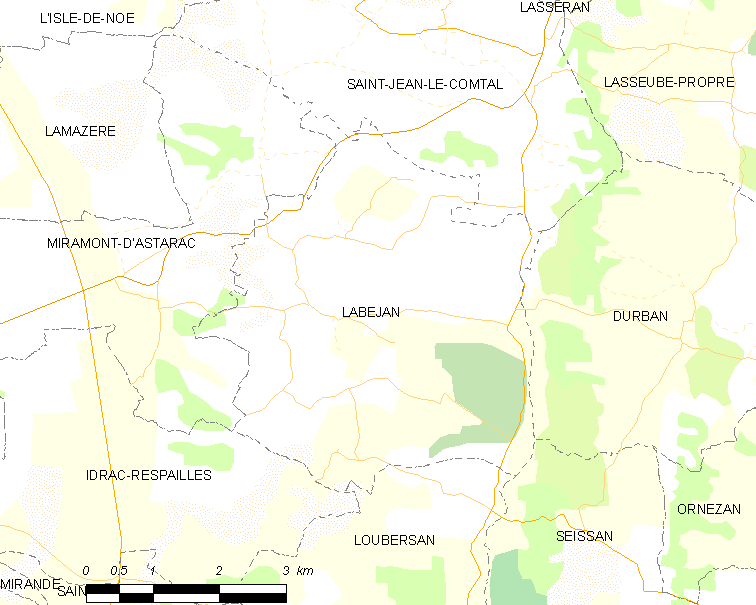
Labéjan and its surrounding communes

== Population ==
Historical population
Year	Pop.	±% p.a.
1968	273	—
1975	224	−2.79%
1982	229	+0.32%
1990	255	+1.35%
1999	259	+0.17%
2007	308	+2.19%
2012	342	+2.12%
2017	303	−2.39%
2023	290	−0.73%
Source: INSEE

== See also ==
- Communes of the Gers department
