= Castex, Gers =

Castex
- Commune
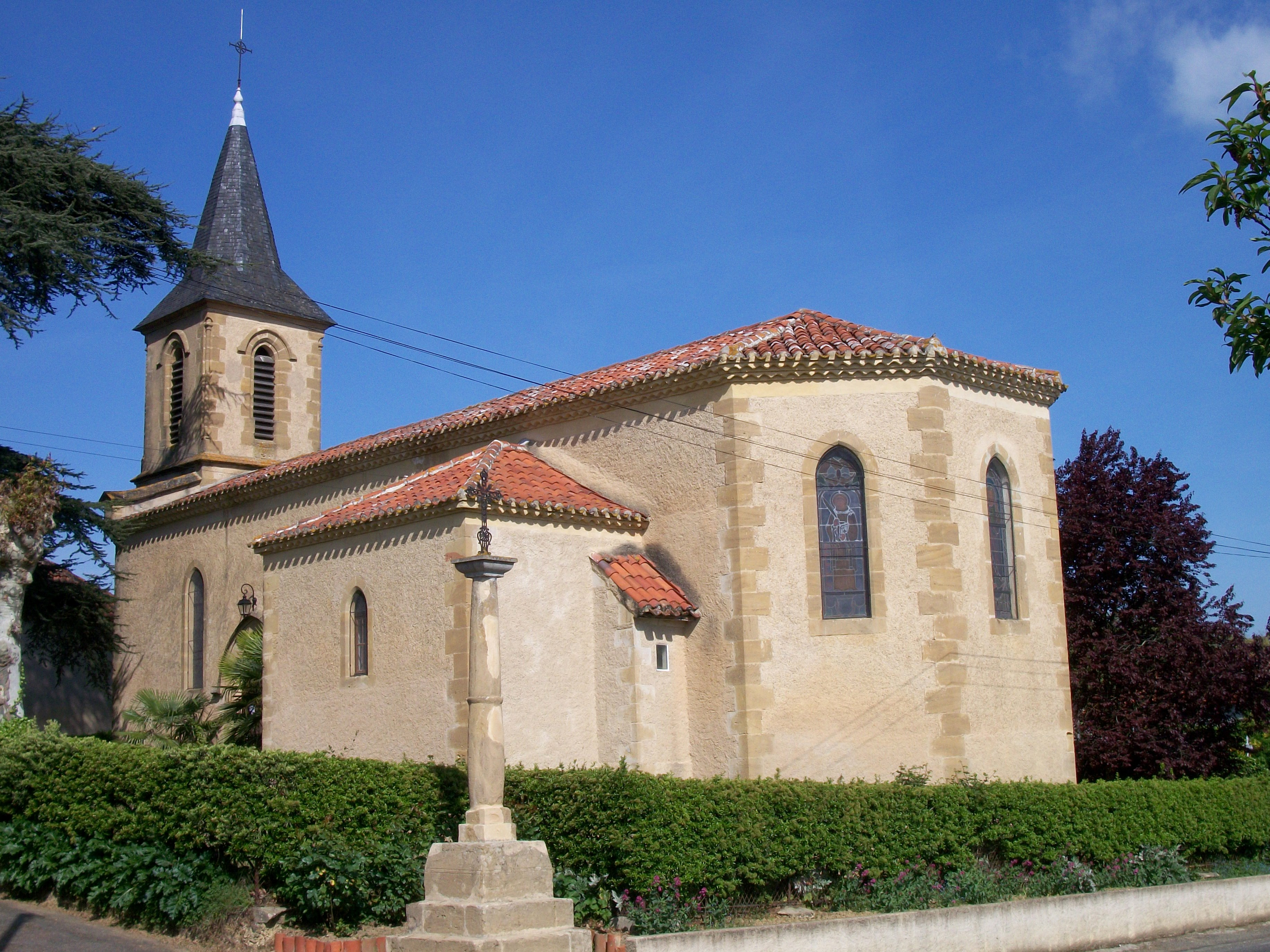
- The church in Castex
- Location of Castex
- Location within France Location within Occitanie
- Coordinates: 43°22′35″N 0°18′41″E
- Country: France
- Region: Occitania
- Department: Gers
- Arrondissement: Mirande
- Canton: Mirande-Astarac

Government
  - Mayor (2020–2026): Robert Sassoli
- Area^{1}: 5.38 km^{2} (2.08 sq mi)
- Elevation: 242 m (794 ft)
- Highest elevation: 323 m (1,060 ft)
- Lowest elevation: 217 m (712 ft)
- Population (2023): 75
  - Density: 14/km^{2} (36/sq mi)
- Time zone: UTC+01:00 (CET)
  - Summer (DST): UTC+02:00 (CEST)
- INSEE/Postal code: 32086 /32170
- ^{1} French Land Register data, which excludes lakes, ponds, glaciers > 1 km^{2} (0.386 sq mi or 247 acres) and river estuaries.

Castex is a commune in the Gers department in southwestern France.

== Geography ==
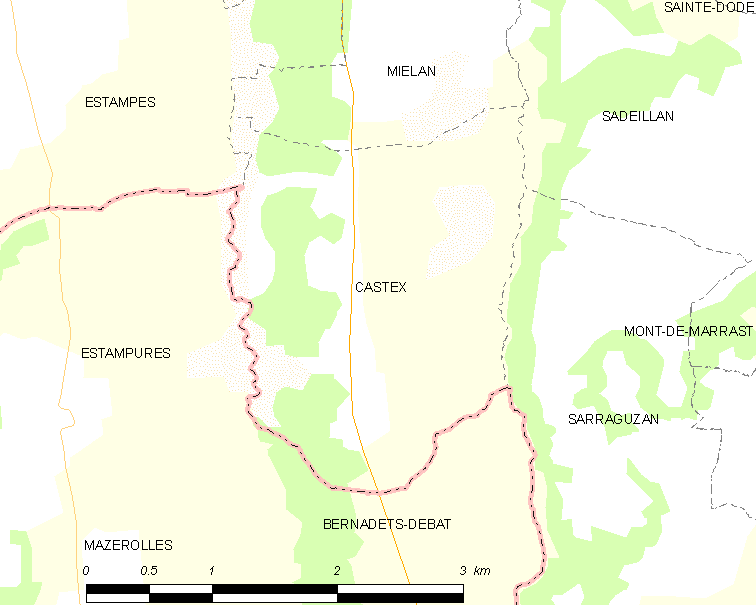
Castex and its surrounding communes

== Population ==
Historical population
Year	Pop.	±% p.a.
1968	154	—
1975	120	−3.50%
1982	100	−2.57%
1990	87	−1.73%
1999	88	+0.13%
2007	94	+0.83%
2012	93	−0.21%
2017	86	−1.55%
2023	75	−2.26%
Source: INSEE

== See also ==
- Communes of the Gers department
