= Montaut, Gers =

Montaut
- Commune
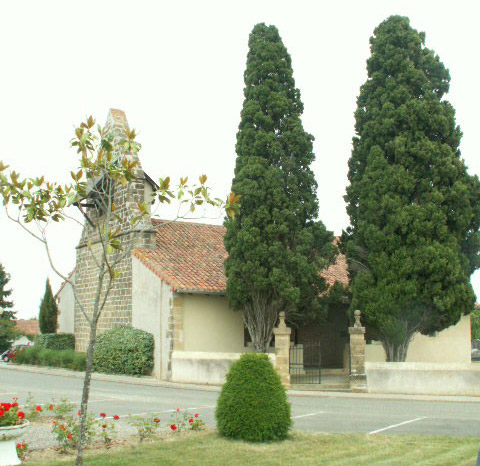
- The church in Montaut
- Location of Montaut
- Location within France Location within Occitanie
- Coordinates: 43°23′42″N 0°25′13″E
- Country: France
- Region: Occitania
- Department: Gers
- Arrondissement: Mirande
- Canton: Mirande-Astarac

Government
  - Mayor (2020–2026): Christian Daujan
- Area^{1}: 8.48 km^{2} (3.27 sq mi)
- Elevation: 120 m (390 ft)
- Highest elevation: 262 m (860 ft)
- Lowest elevation: 180 m (590 ft)
- Population (2023): 122
  - Density: 14.4/km^{2} (37.3/sq mi)
- Time zone: UTC+01:00 (CET)
  - Summer (DST): UTC+02:00 (CEST)
- INSEE/Postal code: 32278 /32300
- ^{1} French Land Register data, which excludes lakes, ponds, glaciers > 1 km^{2} (0.386 sq mi or 247 acres) and river estuaries.

Montaut (French pronunciation: [mɔ̃to]) is a commune in the Gers department in southwestern France.

== Geography ==
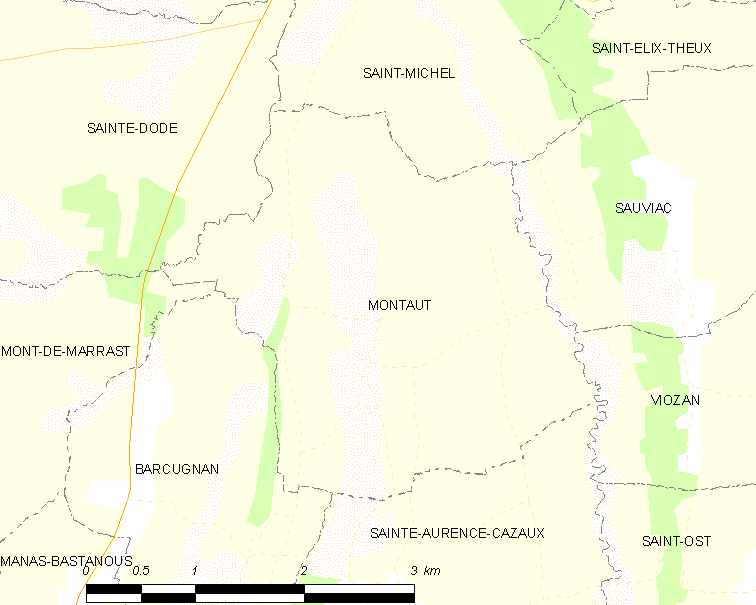
Montaut and its surrounding communes

== Population ==
Historical population
Year	Pop.	±% p.a.
1968	201	—
1975	179	−1.64%
1982	154	−2.13%
1990	134	−1.72%
1999	117	−1.50%
2007	117	+0.00%
2012	111	−1.05%
2017	117	+1.06%
2023	122	+0.70%
Source: INSEE

== See also ==
- Communes of the Gers department
