= Saint-Martin, Gers =

Saint-Martin
- Commune
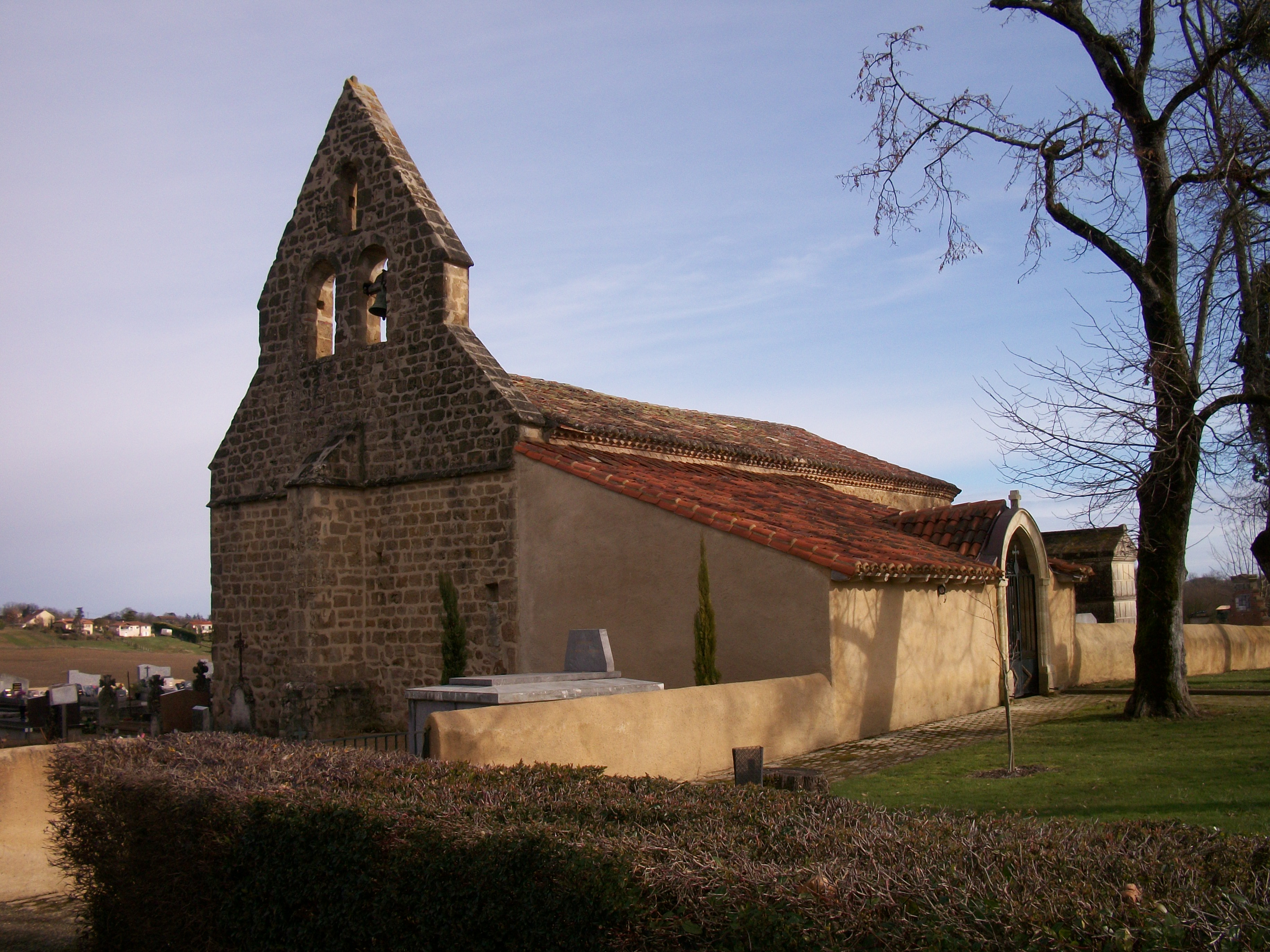
- The church in Saint-Martin
- Location of Saint-Martin
- Location within France Location within Occitanie
- Coordinates: 43°30′25″N 0°22′34″E
- Country: France
- Region: Occitania
- Department: Gers
- Arrondissement: Mirande
- Canton: Mirande-Astarac

Government
  - Mayor (2020–2026): Daniel Pomies
- Area^{1}: 9.07 km^{2} (3.50 sq mi)
- Highest elevation: 263 m (863 ft)
- Lowest elevation: 159 m (522 ft)
- Population (2023): 434
  - Density: 47.9/km^{2} (124/sq mi)
- Time zone: UTC+01:00 (CET)
  - Summer (DST): UTC+02:00 (CEST)
- INSEE/Postal code: 32389 /32300
- ^{1} French Land Register data, which excludes lakes, ponds, glaciers > 1 km^{2} (0.386 sq mi or 247 acres) and river estuaries.

Saint-Martin (French pronunciation: [sɛ̃ maʁtɛ̃]; Gascon: Sent Martin) is a commune in the Gers department in southwestern France.

== Geography ==
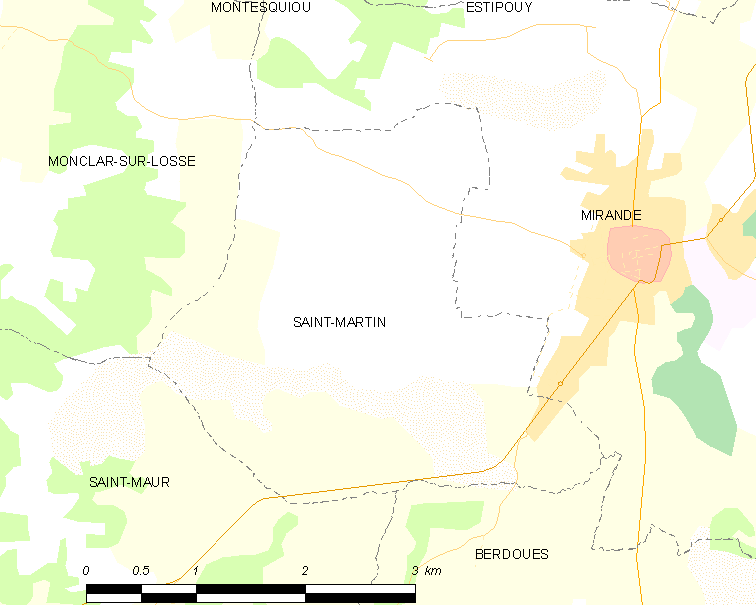
Saint-Martin and its surrounding communes

== Population ==
Historical population
Year	Pop.	±% p.a.
1968	226	—
1975	219	−0.45%
1982	338	+6.40%
1990	363	+0.90%
1999	420	+1.63%
2007	445	+0.73%
2012	441	−0.18%
2017	459	+0.80%
2023	434	−0.93%
Source: INSEE

== See also ==
- Communes of the Gers department
