= Mont-de-Marrast =

- Commune
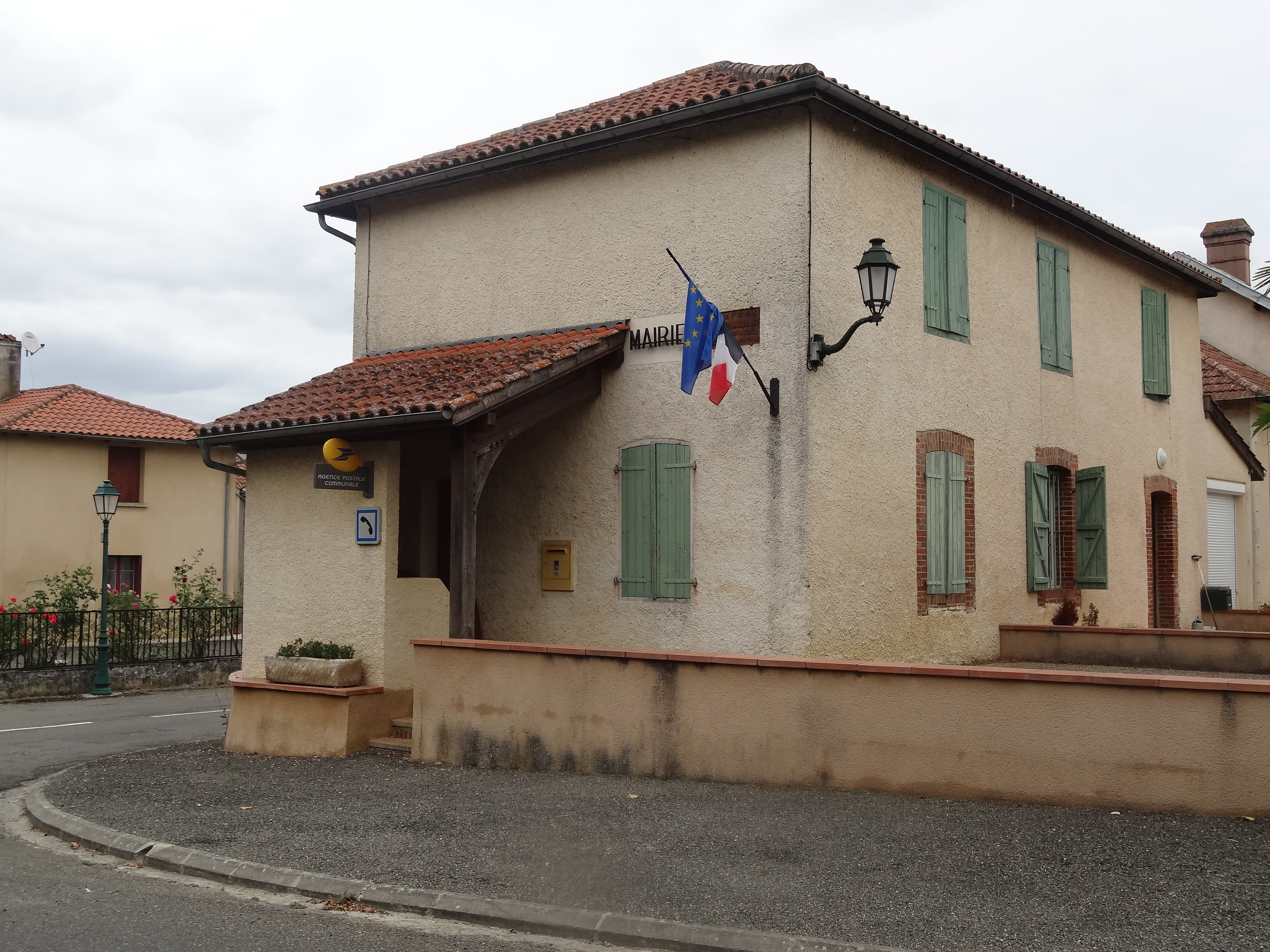
- The town hall in Mont-de-Marrast
- Location of Mont-de-Marrast
- Location within France Location within Occitanie
- Coordinates: 43°23′01″N 0°21′33″E
- Country: France
- Region: Occitania
- Department: Gers
- Arrondissement: Mirande
- Canton: Mirande-Astarac

Government
  - Mayor (2020–2026): Jean-Claude Laborie
- Area^{1}: 7 km^{2} (2.7 sq mi)
- Elevation: 280 m (920 ft)
- Highest elevation: 304 m (997 ft)
- Lowest elevation: 191 m (627 ft)
- Population (2023): 106
  - Density: 15/km^{2} (39/sq mi)
- Time zone: UTC+01:00 (CET)
  - Summer (DST): UTC+02:00 (CEST)
- INSEE/Postal code: 32281 /32170
- ^{1} French Land Register data, which excludes lakes, ponds, glaciers > 1 km^{2} (0.386 sq mi or 247 acres) and river estuaries.

Mont-de-Marrast is a commune in the Gers department in southwestern France.

== Geography ==
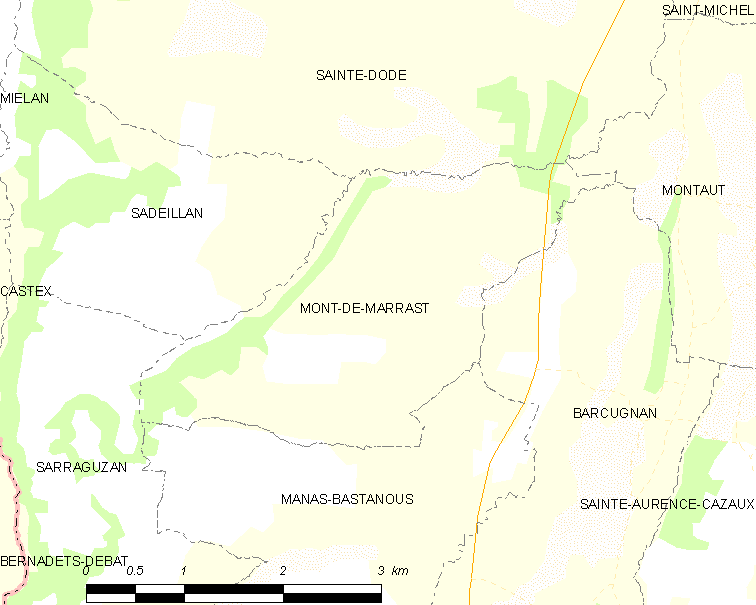
Mont-de-Marrast and its surrounding communes

== Population ==
Historical population
Year	Pop.	±% p.a.
1968	149	—
1975	121	−2.93%
1982	100	−2.69%
1990	100	+0.00%
1999	102	+0.22%
2007	90	−1.55%
2012	109	+3.91%
2017	111	+0.36%
2023	106	−0.77%
Source: INSEE

== See also ==
- Communes of the Gers department
