= Canton of Mirande-Astarac =

Administrative division of Gers department, France

Coordinates: 43.51°N 0.40°E

The canton of Mirande-Astarac is an administrative division of the Gers department, southwestern France. It was created at the French canton reorganisation which came into effect in March 2015. Its seat is in Mirande.

It consists of the following communes:

1. Aux-Aussat
2. Barcugnan
3. Bazugues
4. Beccas
5. Belloc-Saint-Clamens
6. Berdoues
7. Betplan
8. Castex
9. Clermont-Pouyguillès
10. Duffort
11. Estampes
12. Haget
13. Idrac-Respaillès
14. Laas
15. Labéjan
16. Lagarde-Hachan
17. Laguian-Mazous
18. Lamazère
19. Loubersan
20. Malabat
21. Manas-Bastanous
22. Marseillan
23. Miélan
24. Miramont-d'Astarac
25. Mirande
26. Moncassin
27. Montaut
28. Mont-de-Marrast
29. Montégut-Arros
30. Ponsampère
31. Sadeillan
32. Sainte-Aurence-Cazaux
33. Sainte-Dode
34. Saint-Élix-Theux
35. Saint-Martin
36. Saint-Maur
37. Saint-Médard
38. Saint-Michel
39. Saint-Ost
40. Sarraguzan
41. Sauviac
42. Villecomtal-sur-Arros
43. Viozan
