= Sainte-Aurence-Cazaux =

- Commune
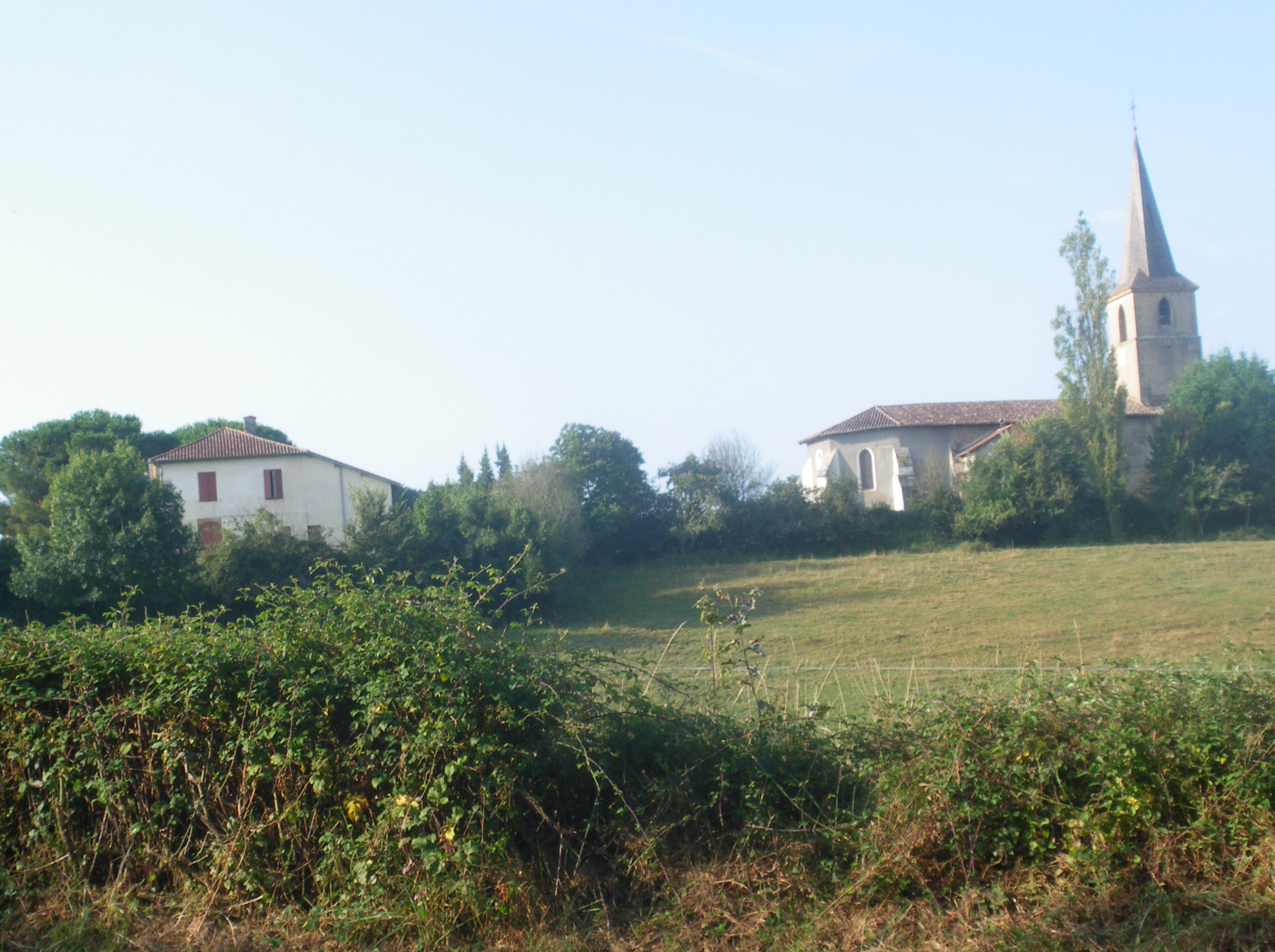
- A general view of Sainte-Aurence-Cazaux
- Location of Sainte-Aurence-Cazaux
- Location within France Location within Occitanie
- Coordinates: 43°22′34″N 0°25′23″E
- Country: France
- Region: Occitania
- Department: Gers
- Arrondissement: Mirande
- Canton: Mirande-Astarac

Government
  - Mayor (2020–2026): Jean-Marc Le Mao
- Area^{1}: 9.54 km^{2} (3.68 sq mi)
- Elevation: 282 m (925 ft)
- Highest elevation: 319 m (1,047 ft)
- Lowest elevation: 194 m (636 ft)
- Population (2023): 89
  - Density: 9.3/km^{2} (24/sq mi)
- Time zone: UTC+01:00 (CET)
  - Summer (DST): UTC+02:00 (CEST)
- INSEE/Postal code: 32363 /32300
- ^{1} French Land Register data, which excludes lakes, ponds, glaciers > 1 km^{2} (0.386 sq mi or 247 acres) and river estuaries.

Sainte-Aurence-Cazaux is a commune in the Gers department in southwestern France.

== Geography ==
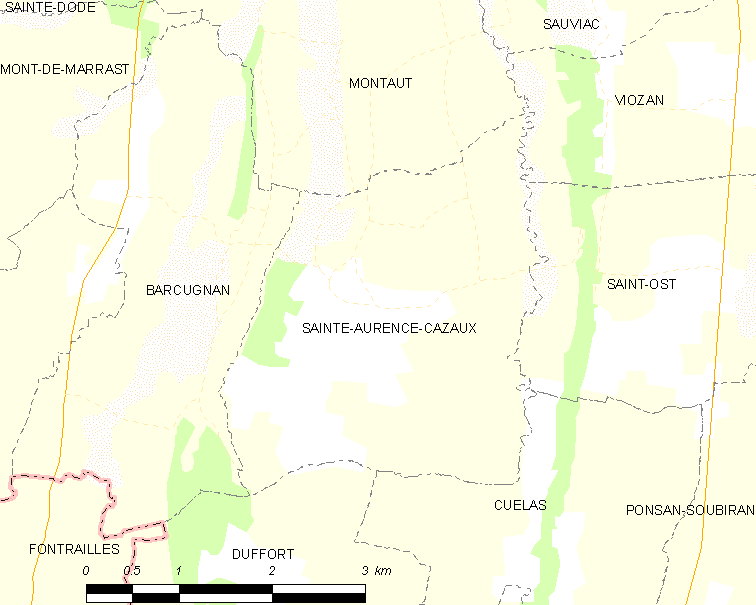
Saint-Aurence-Cazaux and its surrounding communes

== Population ==
Historical population
Year	Pop.	±% p.a.
1968	181	—
1975	140	−3.60%
1982	130	−1.05%
1990	138	+0.75%
1999	118	−1.72%
2007	120	+0.21%
2012	119	−0.17%
2017	101	−3.23%
2023	89	−2.09%
Source: INSEE

== See also ==
- Communes of the Gers department
