= Bazugues =

- Commune
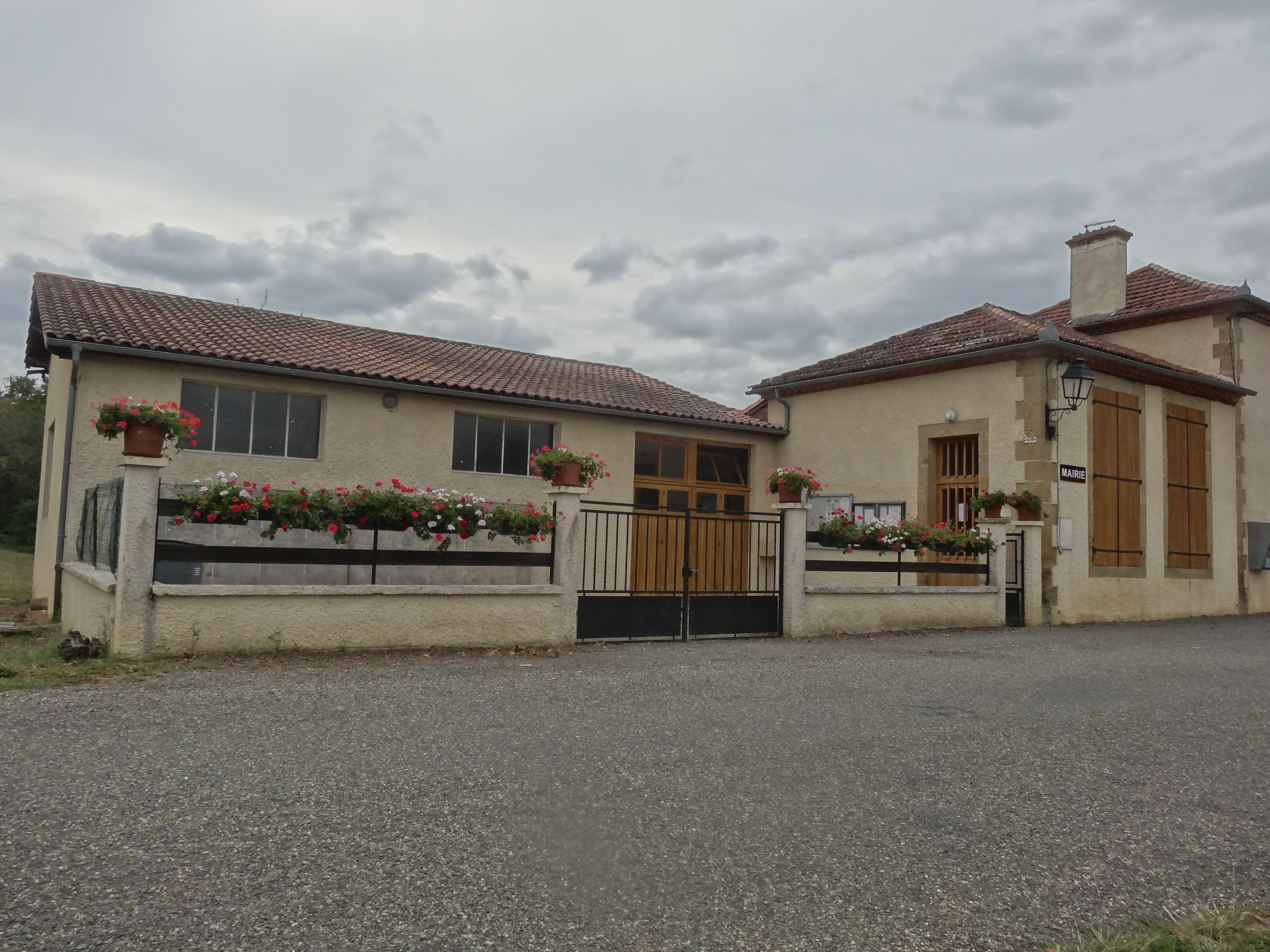
- The town hall in Bazugues
- Location of Bazugues
- Location within France Location within Occitanie
- Coordinates: 43°26′57″N 0°20′42″E
- Country: France
- Region: Occitania
- Department: Gers
- Arrondissement: Mirande
- Canton: Mirande-Astarac

Government
  - Mayor (2020–2026): Jean-Noël Jammet
- Area^{1}: 5.36 km^{2} (2.07 sq mi)
- Elevation: 170 m (560 ft)
- Highest elevation: 301 m (988 ft)
- Lowest elevation: 195 m (640 ft)
- Population (2023): 63
  - Density: 12/km^{2} (30/sq mi)
- Time zone: UTC+01:00 (CET)
  - Summer (DST): UTC+02:00 (CEST)
- INSEE/Postal code: 32034 /32170
- ^{1} French Land Register data, which excludes lakes, ponds, glaciers > 1 km^{2} (0.386 sq mi or 247 acres) and river estuaries.

Bazugues (French pronunciation: [bazyɡ]; Occitan: Basugas) is a commune in the Gers department in southwestern France.

== Geography ==
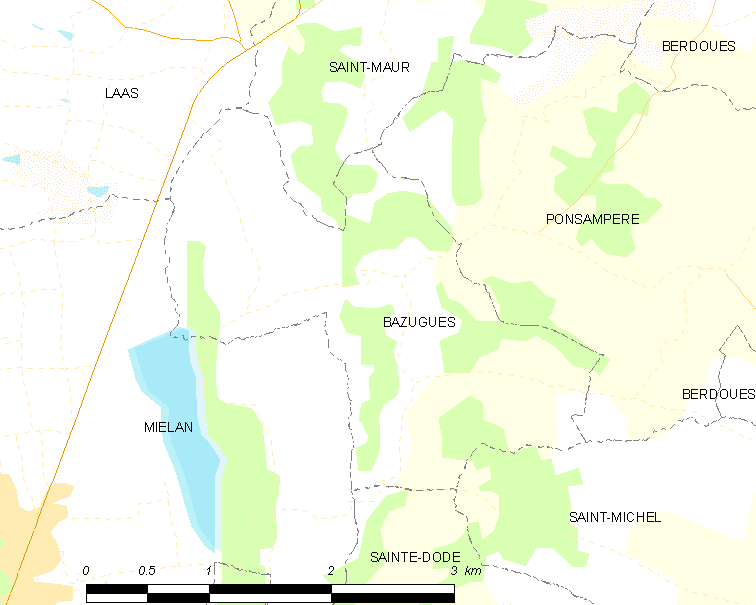
Bazugues and its surrounding communes

== Population ==
Historical population
| Year | Pop. | ±% p.a. |
|---|---|---|
| 1968 | 68 | — |
| 1975 | 57 | −2.49% |
| 1982 | 56 | −0.25% |
| 1990 | 67 | +2.27% |
| 1999 | 55 | −2.17% |
| 2007 | 57 | +0.45% |
| 2012 | 67 | +3.29% |
| 2017 | 57 | −3.18% |
| 2023 | 63 | +1.68% |
Source: INSEE

== See also ==
- Communes of the Gers department
