= Montégut-Arros =

- Commune
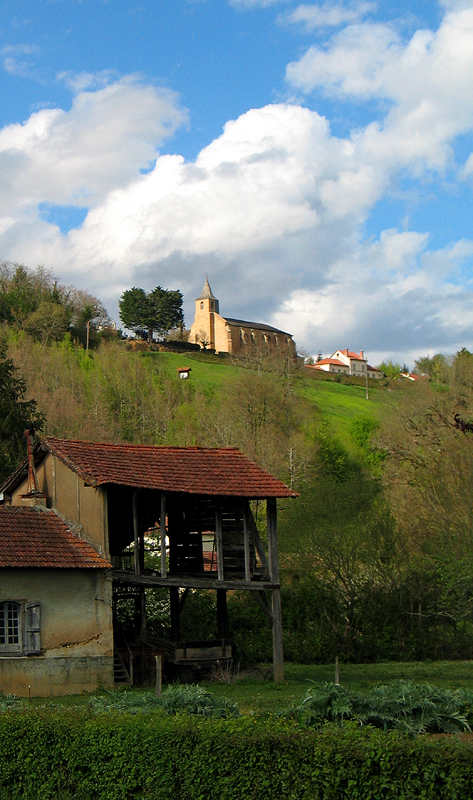
- The church and surroundings in Montégut-Arros
- Location of Montégut-Arros
- Location within France Location within Occitanie
- Coordinates: 43°22′57″N 0°13′25″E
- Country: France
- Region: Occitania
- Department: Gers
- Arrondissement: Mirande
- Canton: Mirande-Astarac

Government
  - Mayor (2020–2026): Francis Monserrat
- Area^{1}: 15.29 km^{2} (5.90 sq mi)
- Elevation: 180 m (590 ft)
- Highest elevation: 334 m (1,096 ft)
- Lowest elevation: 170 m (560 ft)
- Population (2023): 280
  - Density: 18/km^{2} (47/sq mi)
- Time zone: UTC+01:00 (CET)
  - Summer (DST): UTC+02:00 (CEST)
- INSEE/Postal code: 32283 /32730
- ^{1} French Land Register data, which excludes lakes, ponds, glaciers > 1 km^{2} (0.386 sq mi or 247 acres) and river estuaries.

Montégut-Arros (French pronunciation: [mɔ̃teɡy aʁɔs]; Gascon: Montegut Arròs) is a commune in the Gers département in southwestern France.

== Geography ==
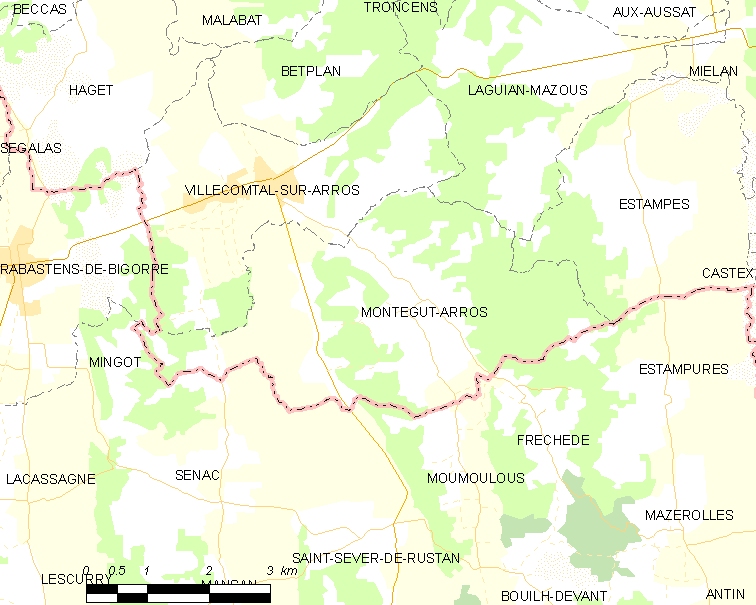
Montégut-Arros and its surrounding communes

== Population ==
Its inhabitants are known as Montégutois (male) or Montégutoise (female) in French.

Historical population
Year	Pop.	±% p.a.
1968	340	—
1975	335	−0.21%
1982	350	+0.63%
1990	328	−0.81%
1999	286	−1.51%
2007	292	+0.26%
2012	283	−0.62%
2017	293	+0.70%
2023	280	−0.75%
Source: INSEE

== See also ==
- Communes of the Gers department
