= Duffort =

- Commune
- Location of Duffort
- Location within France Location within Occitanie
- Coordinates: 43°20′42″N 0°24′51″E
- Country: France
- Region: Occitania
- Department: Gers
- Arrondissement: Mirande
- Canton: Mirande-Astarac

Government
  - Mayor (2020–2026): Patrick Laprebende
- Area^{1}: 9.84 km^{2} (3.80 sq mi)
- Elevation: 324 m (1,063 ft)
- Highest elevation: 331 m (1,086 ft)
- Lowest elevation: 215 m (705 ft)
- Population (2023): 121
  - Density: 12.3/km^{2} (31.8/sq mi)
- Time zone: UTC+01:00 (CET)
  - Summer (DST): UTC+02:00 (CEST)
- INSEE/Postal code: 32116 /32170
- ^{1} French Land Register data, which excludes lakes, ponds, glaciers > 1 km^{2} (0.386 sq mi or 247 acres) and river estuaries.

Duffort (French pronunciation: [dyfɔʁ]; Gascon: Durfòrt) is a commune in the Gers department in southwestern France.

== Geography ==
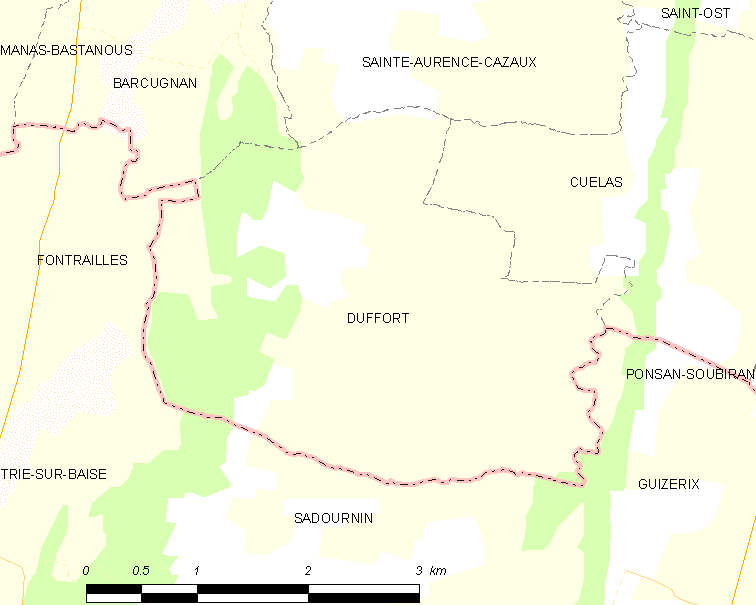
Duffort and its surrounding communes

== Population ==
Historical population
Year	Pop.	±% p.a.
1968	191	—
1975	179	−0.92%
1982	153	−2.22%
1990	149	−0.33%
1999	141	−0.61%
2007	134	−0.63%
2012	138	+0.59%
2017	141	+0.43%
2023	121	−2.52%
Source: INSEE

== See also ==
- Communes of the Gers department
