= Beccas =

- Commune
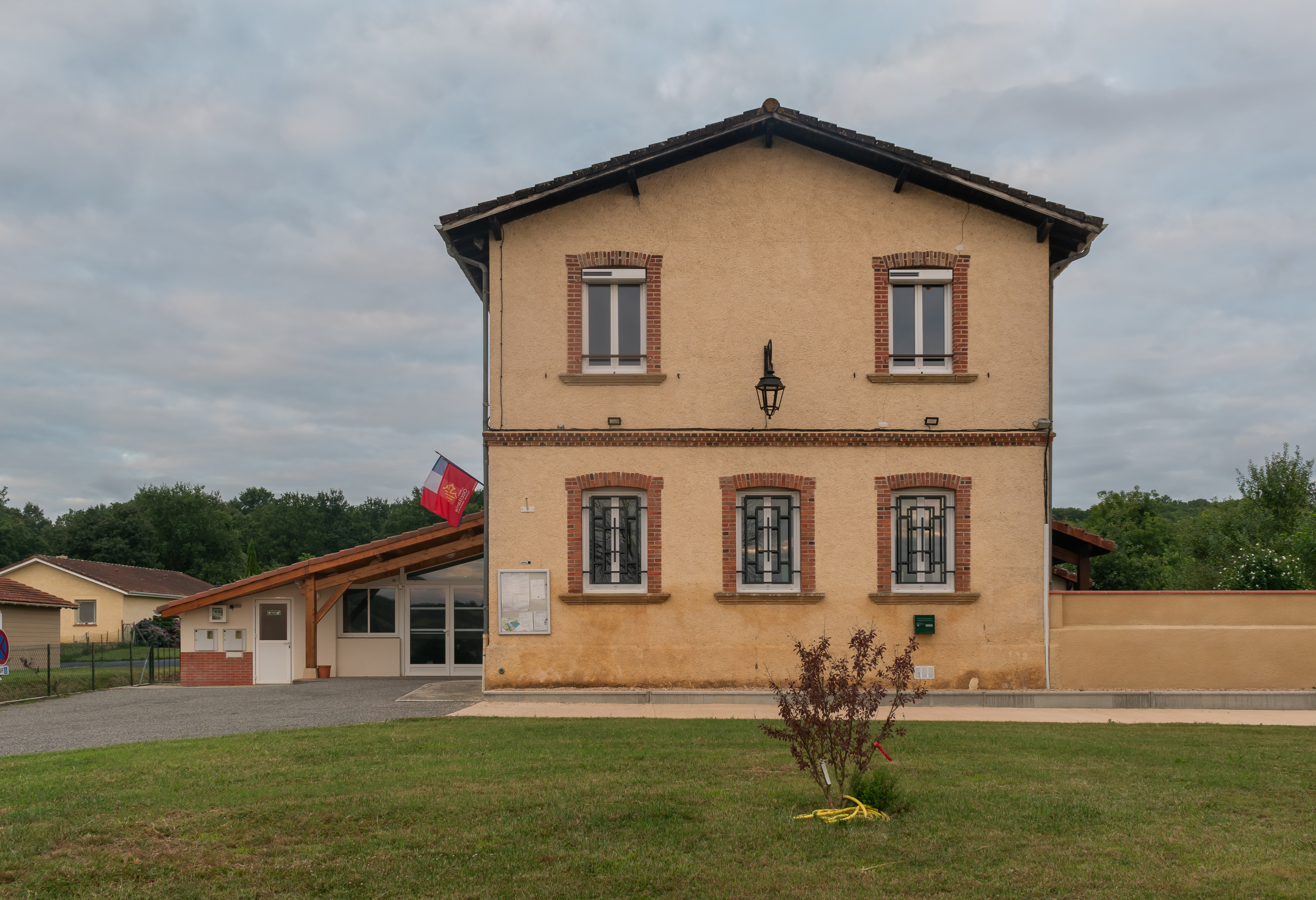
- Town hall of Beccas

- Coat of arms
- Location of Beccas
- Location within France Location within Occitanie
- Coordinates: 43°25′51″N 0°09′19″E
- Country: France
- Region: Occitania
- Department: Gers
- Arrondissement: Mirande
- Canton: Mirande-Astarac

Government
  - Mayor (2020–2026): Pierre Cano
- Area^{1}: 3.38 km^{2} (1.31 sq mi)
- Elevation: 186 m (610 ft)
- Highest elevation: 275 m (902 ft)
- Lowest elevation: 159 m (522 ft)
- Population (2023): 122
  - Density: 36.1/km^{2} (93.5/sq mi)
- Time zone: UTC+01:00 (CET)
  - Summer (DST): UTC+02:00 (CEST)
- INSEE/Postal code: 32039 /32730
- ^{1} French Land Register data, which excludes lakes, ponds, glaciers > 1 km^{2} (0.386 sq mi or 247 acres) and river estuaries.

Beccas is a commune in the Gers department in southwestern France.

== Geography ==
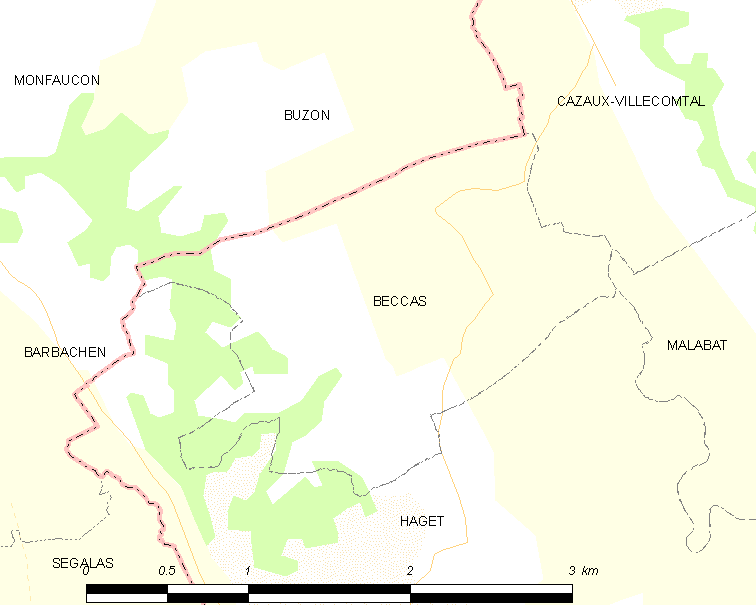
Beccas and its surrounding communes

== Population ==
Historical population
Year	Pop.	±% p.a.
1968	69	—
1975	59	−2.21%
1982	62	+0.71%
1990	77	+2.75%
1999	83	+0.84%
2007	81	−0.30%
2012	109	+6.12%
2017	118	+1.60%
2023	122	+0.56%
Source: INSEE

== See also ==
- Communes of the Gers department
