= Saint-Michel, Gers =

Saint-Michel
- Commune
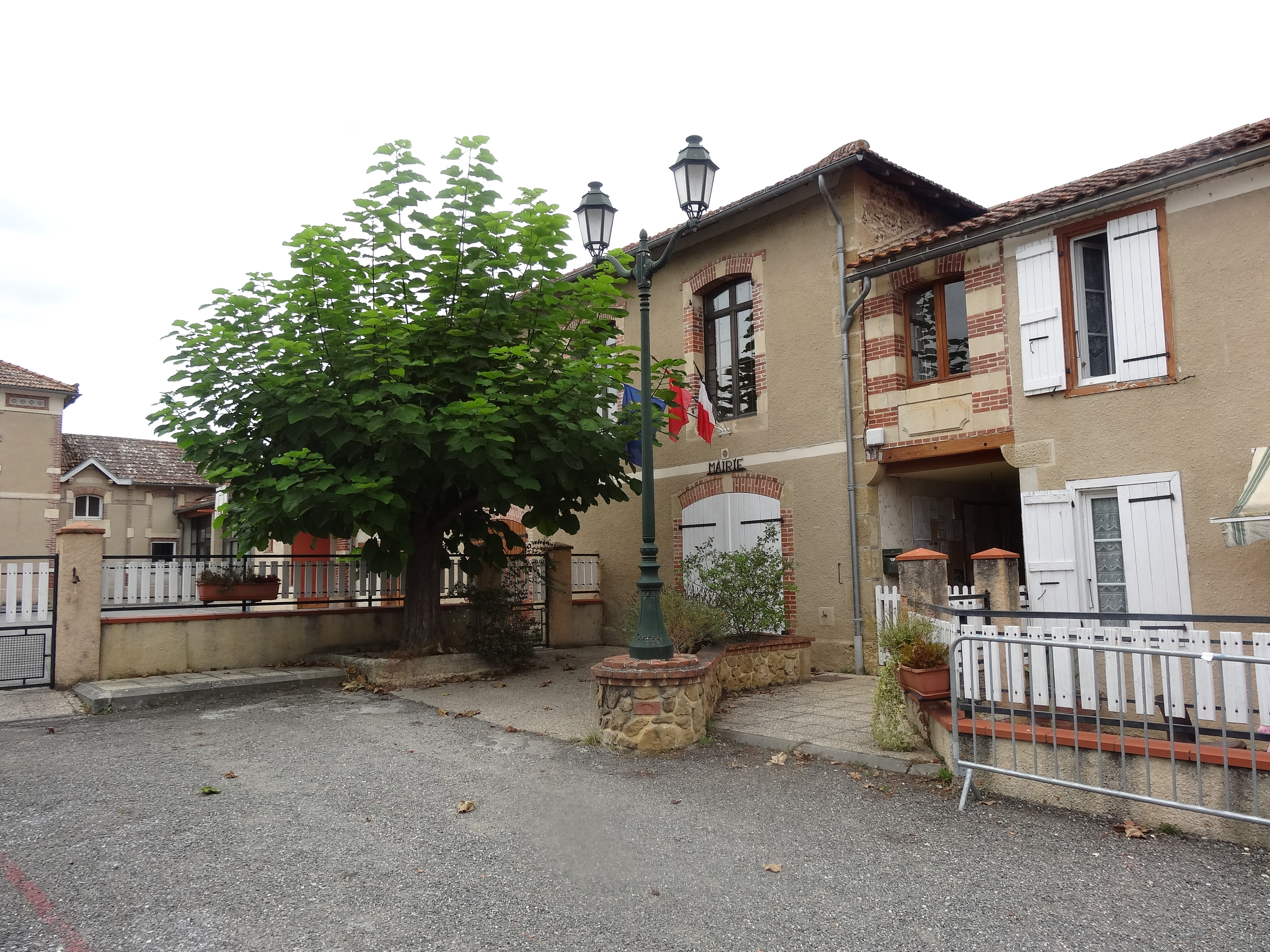
- The town hall in Saint-Michel
- Location of Saint-Michel
- Location within France Location within Occitanie
- Coordinates: 43°25′48″N 0°24′56″E
- Country: France
- Region: Occitania
- Department: Gers
- Arrondissement: Mirande
- Canton: Mirande-Astarac

Government
  - Mayor (2020–2026): Fabien Gouzenne
- Area^{1}: 16.56 km^{2} (6.39 sq mi)
- Elevation: 120 m (390 ft)
- Highest elevation: 286 m (938 ft)
- Lowest elevation: 168 m (551 ft)
- Population (2023): 252
  - Density: 15.2/km^{2} (39.4/sq mi)
- Time zone: UTC+01:00 (CET)
  - Summer (DST): UTC+02:00 (CEST)
- INSEE/Postal code: 32397 /32300
- ^{1} French Land Register data, which excludes lakes, ponds, glaciers > 1 km^{2} (0.386 sq mi or 247 acres) and river estuaries.

Saint-Michel (French pronunciation: [sɛ̃ miʃɛl]; Gascon: Sent Miquèu) is a commune in the Gers department in southwestern France.

== Geography ==
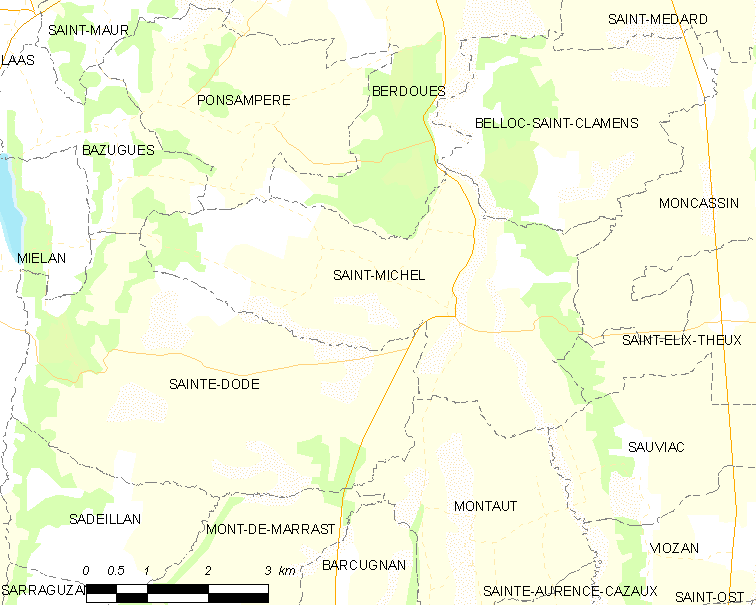
Saint-Michel and its surrounding communes

== Population ==
Historical population
Year	Pop.	±% p.a.
1968	373	—
1975	353	−0.78%
1982	316	−1.57%
1990	276	−1.68%
1999	241	−1.50%
2007	260	+0.95%
2012	264	+0.31%
2017	253	−0.85%
2023	252	−0.07%
Source: INSEE

== See also ==
- Communes of the Gers department
