= Malabat =

- Commune
- Location of Malabat
- Location within France Location within Occitanie
- Coordinates: 43°26′03″N 0°11′11″E
- Country: France
- Region: Occitania
- Department: Gers
- Arrondissement: Mirande
- Canton: Mirande-Astarac

Government
  - Mayor (2020–2026): Céline Salles
- Area^{1}: 5.4 km^{2} (2.1 sq mi)
- Elevation: 200 m (660 ft)
- Highest elevation: 296 m (971 ft)
- Lowest elevation: 162 m (531 ft)
- Population (2023): 100
  - Density: 19/km^{2} (48/sq mi)
- Time zone: UTC+01:00 (CET)
  - Summer (DST): UTC+02:00 (CEST)
- INSEE/Postal code: 32225 /32730
- ^{1} French Land Register data, which excludes lakes, ponds, glaciers > 1 km^{2} (0.386 sq mi or 247 acres) and river estuaries.

Malabat (French pronunciation: [malaba]; Occitan: Malavath) is a commune in the Gers department in southwestern France.

== Geography ==
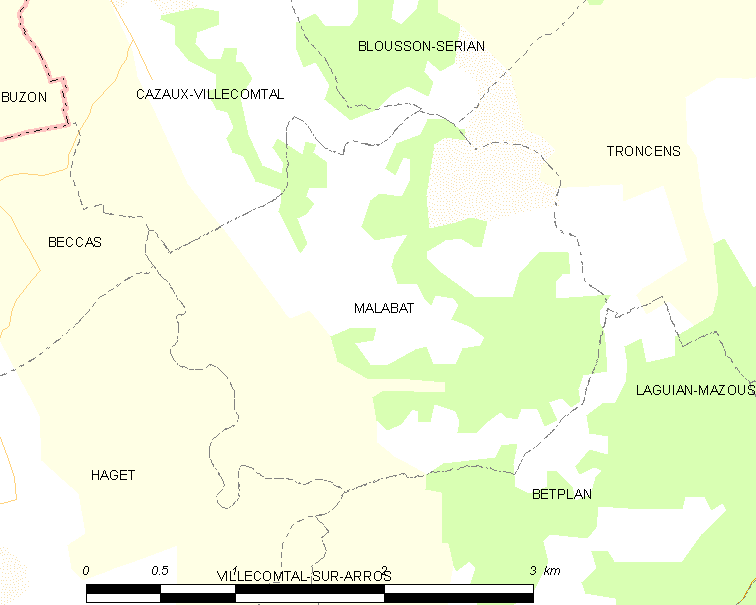
Malabat and its surrounding communes

== Population ==
Historical population
Year	Pop.	±% p.a.
1968	81	—
1975	95	+2.30%
1982	94	−0.15%
1990	89	−0.68%
1999	87	−0.25%
2007	96	+1.24%
2012	105	+1.81%
2017	114	+1.66%
2023	100	−2.16%
Source: INSEE

== See also ==
- Communes of the Gers department
