= Sadeillan =

- Commune
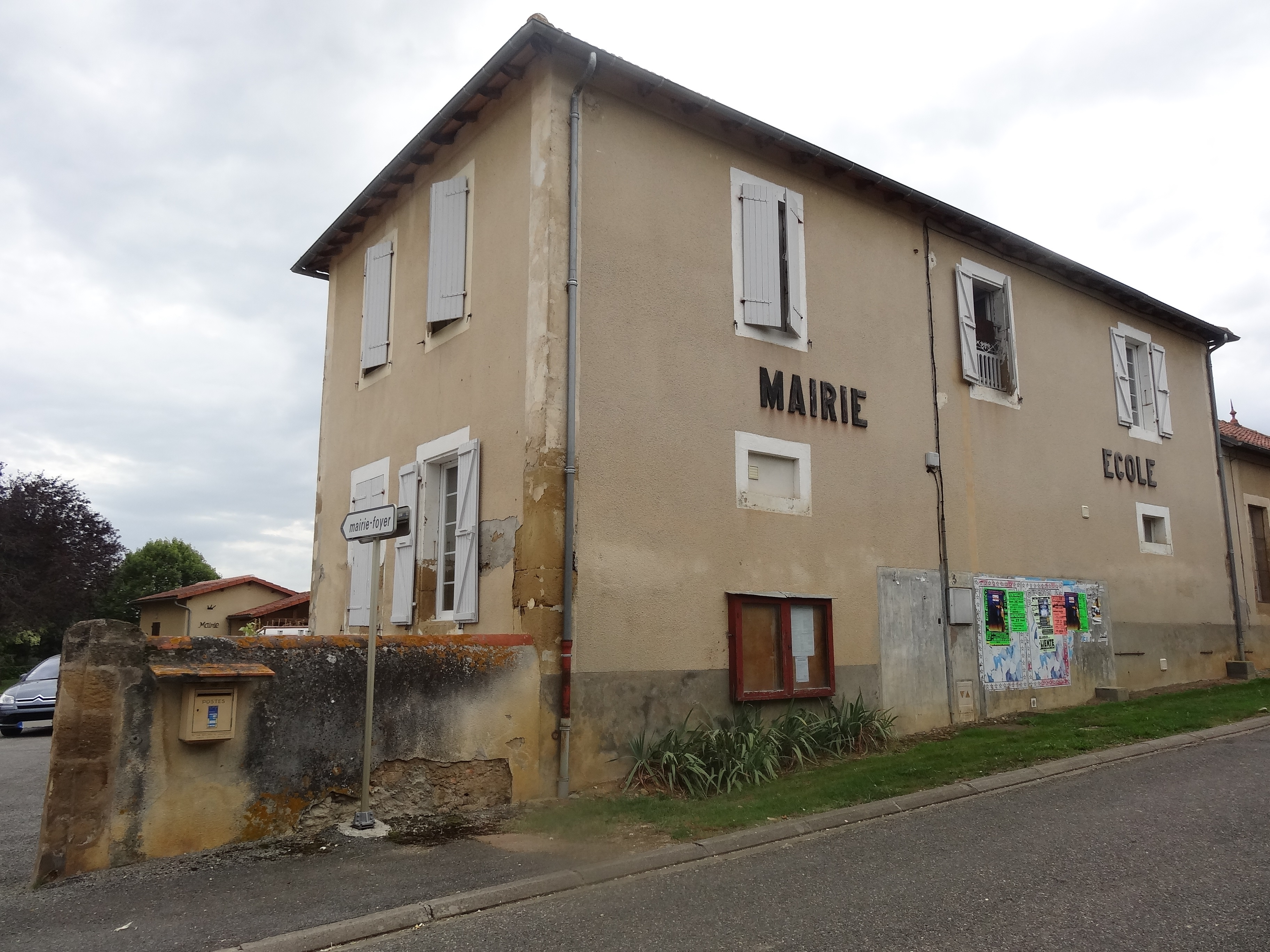
- The town hall in Sadeillan
- Location of Sadeillan
- Location within France Location within Occitanie
- Coordinates: 43°23′38″N 0°20′49″E
- Country: France
- Region: Occitania
- Department: Gers
- Arrondissement: Mirande
- Canton: Mirande-Astarac

Government
  - Mayor (2020–2026): Jean-François Daubian
- Area^{1}: 5.92 km^{2} (2.29 sq mi)
- Elevation: 279 m (915 ft)
- Highest elevation: 325 m (1,066 ft)
- Lowest elevation: 210 m (690 ft)
- Population (2023): 79
  - Density: 13/km^{2} (35/sq mi)
- Time zone: UTC+01:00 (CET)
  - Summer (DST): UTC+02:00 (CEST)
- INSEE/Postal code: 32355 /32170
- ^{1} French Land Register data, which excludes lakes, ponds, glaciers > 1 km^{2} (0.386 sq mi or 247 acres) and river estuaries.

Sadeillan (French pronunciation: [sadɛjɑ̃]; Occitan: Sadelhan) is a commune in the Gers department in southwestern France.

== Geography ==
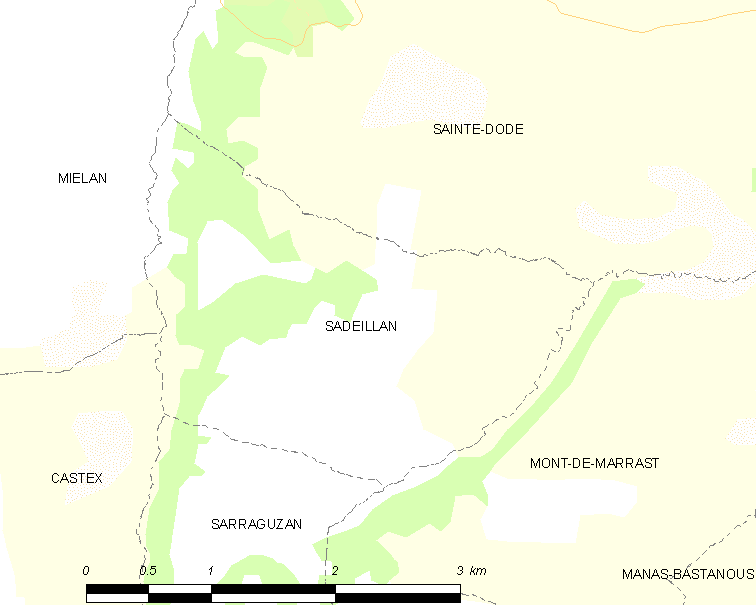
Sadeillan and its surrounding communes

== Population ==
Historical population
Year	Pop.	±% p.a.
1968	117	—
1975	107	−1.27%
1982	95	−1.68%
1990	93	−0.27%
1999	79	−1.80%
2007	76	−0.48%
2012	87	+2.74%
2017	87	+0.00%
2023	79	−1.59%
Source: INSEE

== See also ==
- Communes of the Gers department
