= Sarraguzan =

- Commune
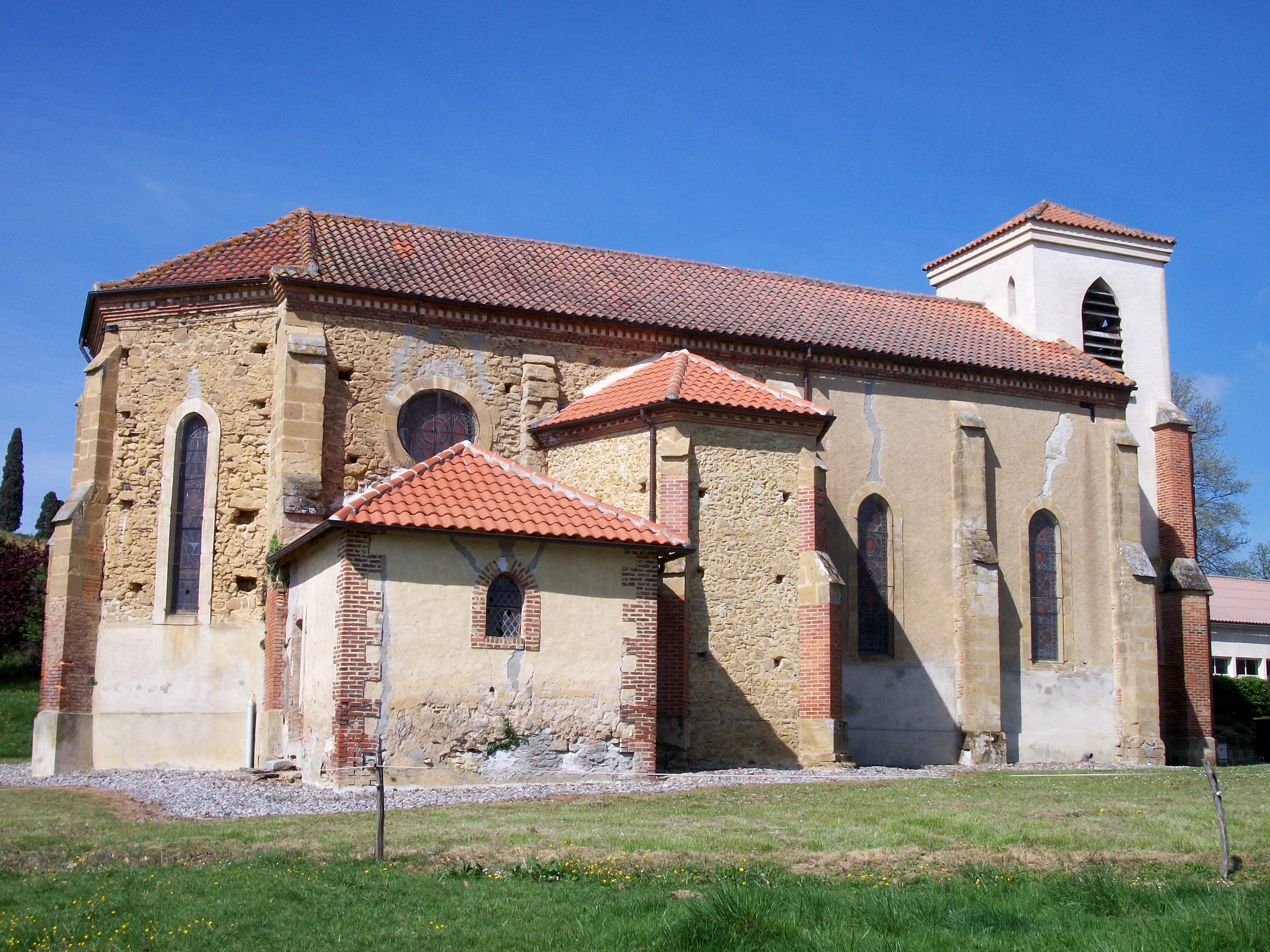
- The church in Sarraguzan
- Location of Sarraguzan
- Location within France Location within Occitanie
- Coordinates: 43°21′28″N 0°20′18″E
- Country: France
- Region: Occitania
- Department: Gers
- Arrondissement: Mirande
- Canton: Mirande-Astarac

Government
  - Mayor (2020–2026): Jacques Bernichan
- Area^{1}: 8.64 km^{2} (3.34 sq mi)
- Elevation: 200 m (660 ft)
- Highest elevation: 378 m (1,240 ft)
- Lowest elevation: 234 m (768 ft)
- Population (2023): 88
  - Density: 10/km^{2} (26/sq mi)
- Time zone: UTC+01:00 (CET)
  - Summer (DST): UTC+02:00 (CEST)
- INSEE/Postal code: 32415 /32170
- ^{1} French Land Register data, which excludes lakes, ponds, glaciers > 1 km^{2} (0.386 sq mi or 247 acres) and river estuaries.

Sarraguzan (French pronunciation: [saʁagyzɑ̃]; Occitan: Sarragusan) is a commune in the Gers department in southwestern France.

== Geography ==
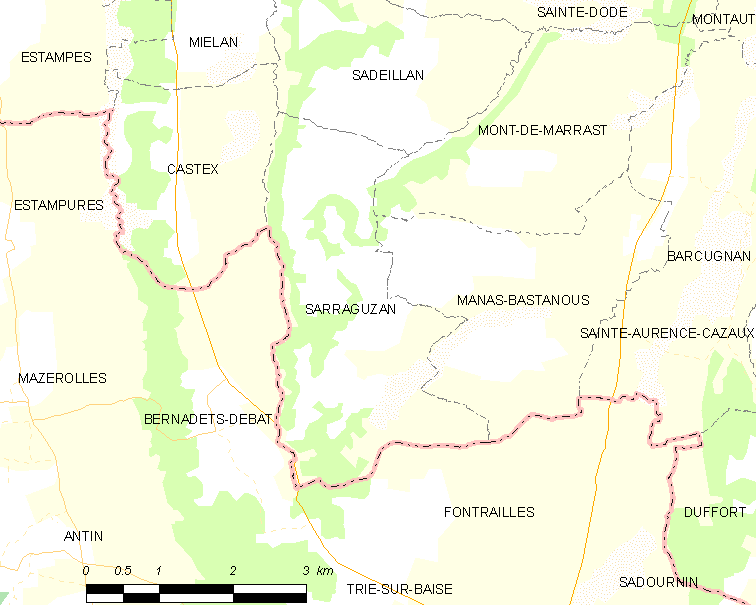
Sarraguzan and its surrounding communes

== Population ==
Historical population
Year	Pop.	±% p.a.
1968	137	—
1975	120	−1.87%
1982	112	−0.98%
1990	88	−2.97%
1999	84	−0.52%
2007	93	+1.28%
2012	94	+0.21%
2017	86	−1.76%
2023	88	+0.38%
Source: INSEE

== See also ==
- Communes of the Gers department
