= Laguian-Mazous =

- Commune
- Location of Laguian-Mazous
- Location within France Location within Occitanie
- Coordinates: 43°25′15″N 0°15′32″E
- Country: France
- Region: Occitania
- Department: Gers
- Arrondissement: Mirande
- Canton: Mirande-Astarac

Government
  - Mayor (2020–2026): Jean-Claude Dazet
- Area^{1}: 9.98 km^{2} (3.85 sq mi)
- Elevation: 320 m (1,050 ft)
- Highest elevation: 347 m (1,138 ft)
- Lowest elevation: 199 m (653 ft)
- Population (2023): 248
  - Density: 24.8/km^{2} (64.4/sq mi)
- Time zone: UTC+01:00 (CET)
  - Summer (DST): UTC+02:00 (CEST)
- INSEE/Postal code: 32181 /32170
- ^{1} French Land Register data, which excludes lakes, ponds, glaciers > 1 km^{2} (0.386 sq mi or 247 acres) and river estuaries.

Laguian-Mazous is a commune in the Gers department in southwestern France.

== Geography ==
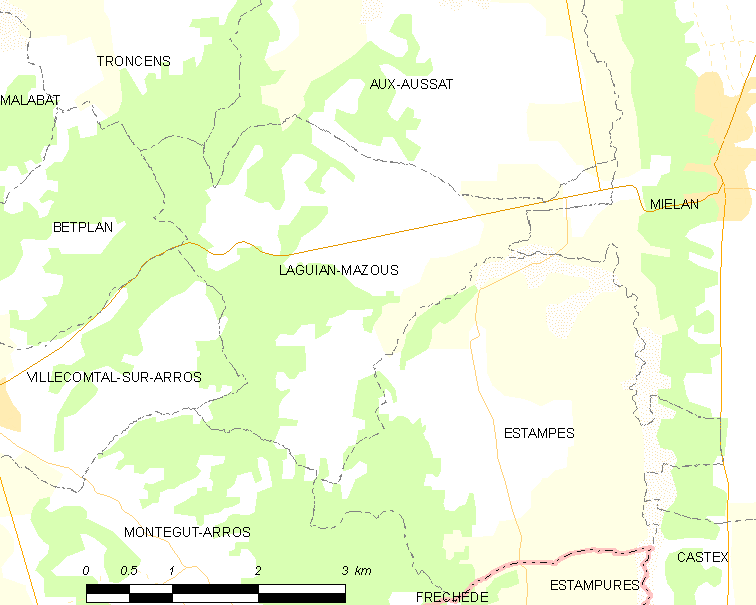
Laguian-Mazous and its surrounding communes

== Population ==
Historical population
Year	Pop.	±% p.a.
1968	243	—
1975	217	−1.60%
1982	250	+2.04%
1990	237	−0.67%
1999	303	+2.77%
2007	276	−1.16%
2012	273	−0.22%
2017	241	−2.46%
2023	248	+0.48%
Source: INSEE

== See also ==
- Communes of the Gers department
