= Marseillan, Gers =

Marseillan
- Commune
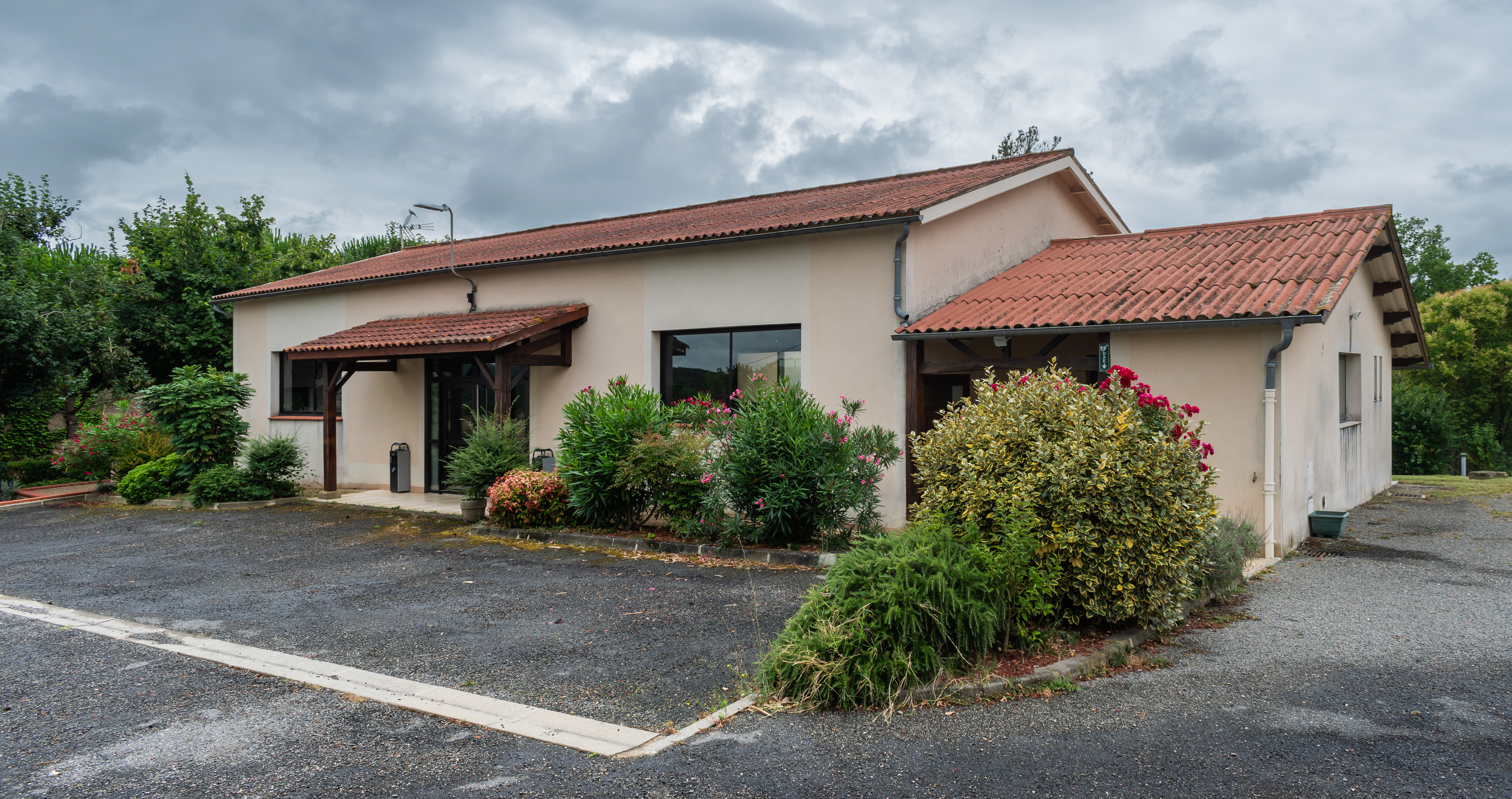
- The town hall in Marseillan
- Location of Marseillan
- Location within France Location within Occitanie
- Coordinates: 43°29′22″N 0°19′03″E
- Country: France
- Region: Occitania
- Department: Gers
- Arrondissement: Mirande
- Canton: Mirande-Astarac
- Intercommunality: Cœur d'Astarac en Gascogne

Government
  - Mayor (2020–2026): Michel Raffin
- Area^{1}: 4.34 km^{2} (1.68 sq mi)
- Elevation: 225 m (738 ft)
- Highest elevation: 273 m (896 ft)
- Lowest elevation: 179 m (587 ft)
- Population (2023): 82
  - Density: 19/km^{2} (49/sq mi)
- Time zone: UTC+01:00 (CET)
  - Summer (DST): UTC+02:00 (CEST)
- INSEE/Postal code: 32238 /32170
- ^{1} French Land Register data, which excludes lakes, ponds, glaciers > 1 km^{2} (0.386 sq mi or 247 acres) and river estuaries.

Marseillan (French pronunciation: [maʁsɛjɑ̃]; Occitan: Marcelhan) is a commune in the Gers department in southwestern France.

== Geography ==
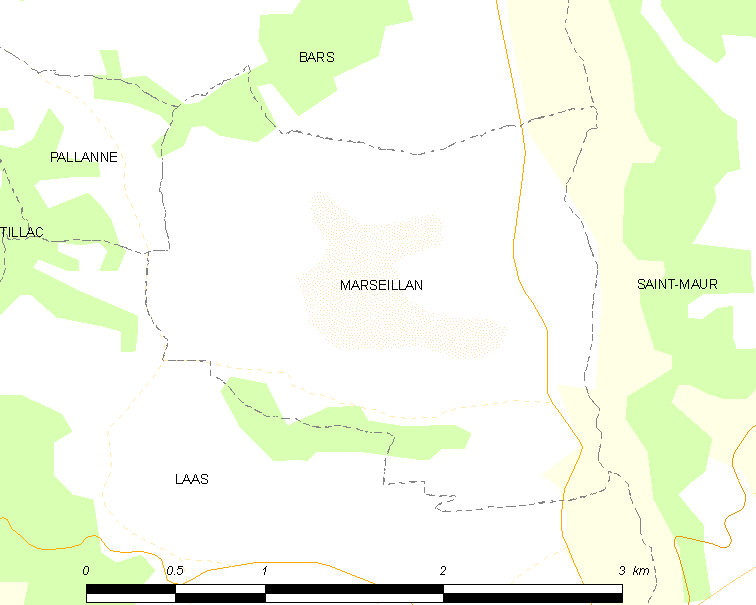
Marseillan and its surrounding communes

== Population ==
Historical population
Year	Pop.	±% p.a.
1968	107	—
1975	87	−2.91%
1982	100	+2.01%
1990	82	−2.45%
1999	68	−2.06%
2007	80	+2.05%
2012	102	+4.98%
2017	90	−2.47%
2023	82	−1.54%
Source: INSEE

== See also ==
- Communes of the Gers department
