= Haget =

- Commune
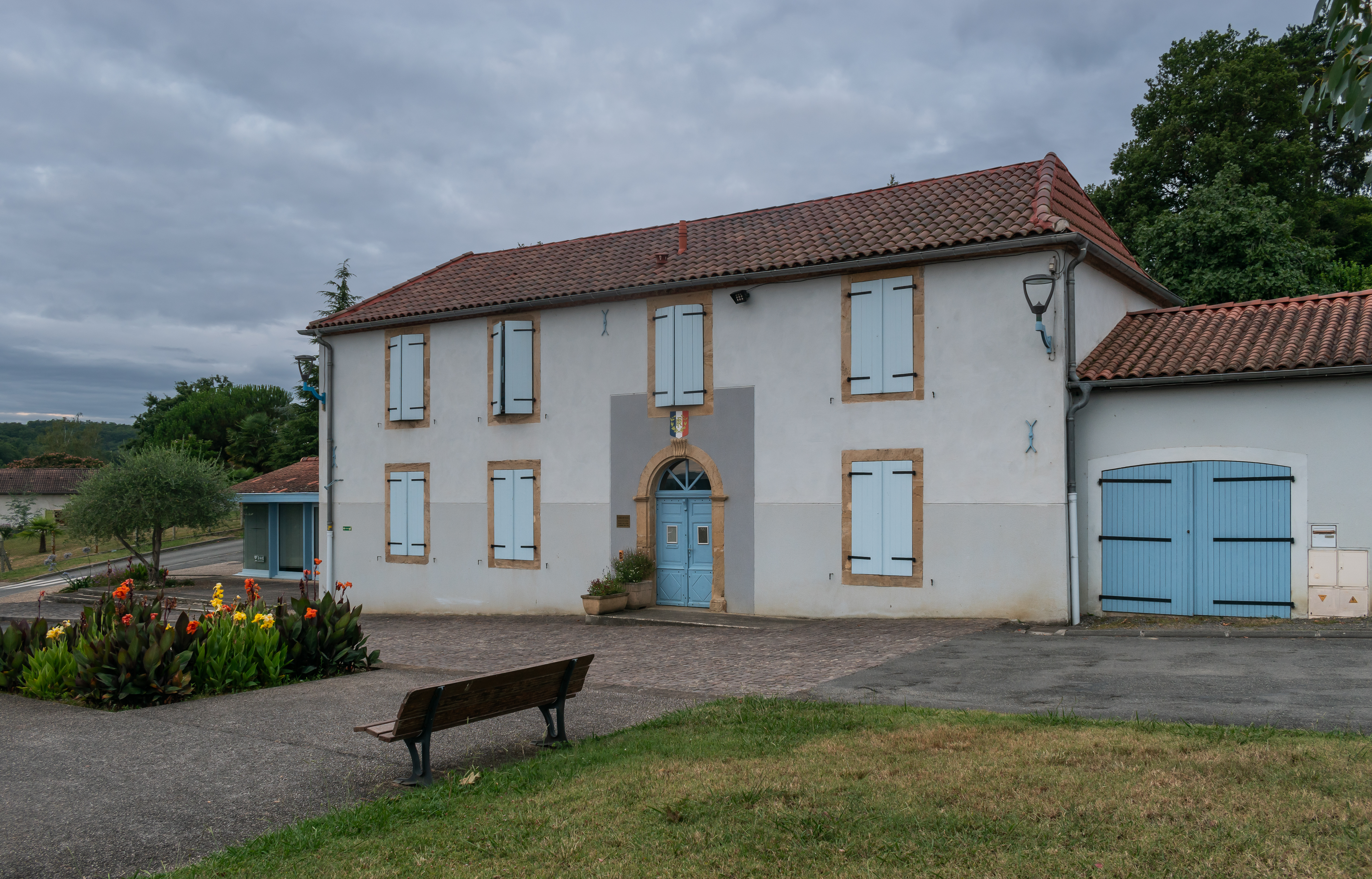
- Town hall of Haget

- Coat of arms
- Location of Haget
- Location within France Location within Occitanie
- Coordinates: 43°25′13″N 0°09′46″E
- Country: France
- Region: Occitania
- Department: Gers
- Arrondissement: Mirande
- Canton: Mirande-Astarac

Government
  - Mayor (2023–2026): Viviane Cyriaque
- Area^{1}: 9.1 km^{2} (3.5 sq mi)
- Elevation: 210 m (690 ft)
- Highest elevation: 270 m (890 ft)
- Lowest elevation: 162 m (531 ft)
- Population (2023): 363
  - Density: 40/km^{2} (100/sq mi)
- Time zone: UTC+01:00 (CET)
  - Summer (DST): UTC+02:00 (CEST)
- INSEE/Postal code: 32152 /32730
- ^{1} French Land Register data, which excludes lakes, ponds, glaciers > 1 km^{2} (0.386 sq mi or 247 acres) and river estuaries.

Haget is a commune in the Gers department in southwestern France.

== Geography ==
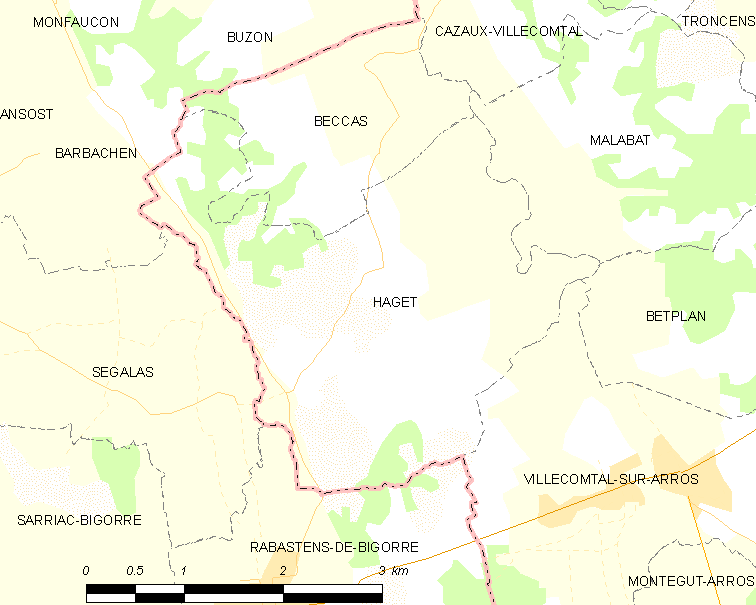
Haget and its surrounding communes

== Population ==
Historical population
Year	Pop.	±% p.a.
1968	289	—
1975	277	−0.60%
1982	314	+1.81%
1990	329	+0.59%
1999	293	−1.28%
2007	303	+0.42%
2012	322	+1.22%
2017	331	+0.55%
2023	363	+1.55%
Source: INSEE

== See also ==
- Communes of the Gers department
