= Manas-Bastanous =

- Commune
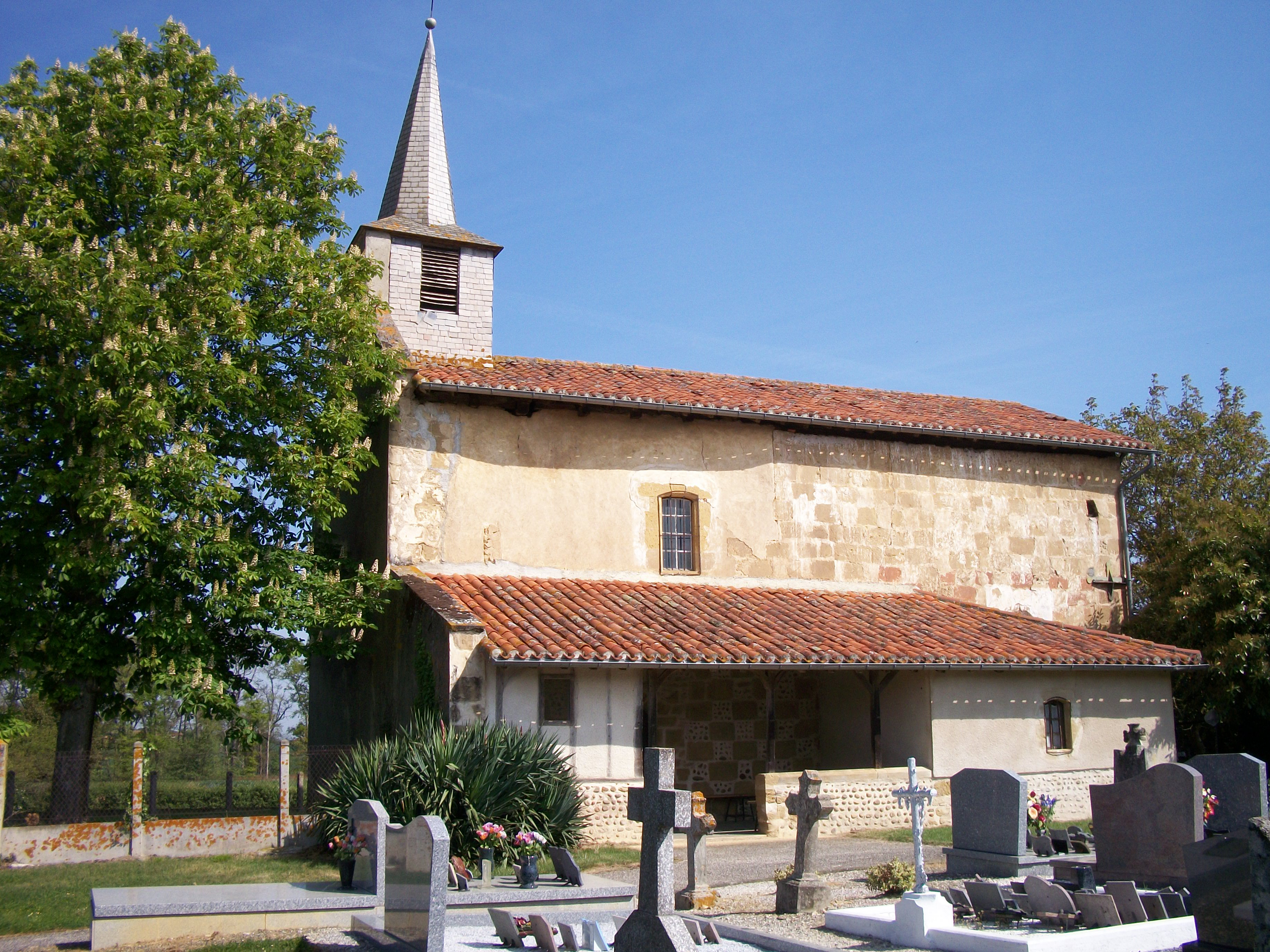
- Church of Bastanous
- Location of Manas-Bastanous
- Location within France Location within Occitanie
- Coordinates: 43°22′22″N 0°21′51″E
- Country: France
- Region: Occitania
- Department: Gers
- Arrondissement: Mirande
- Canton: Mirande-Astarac

Government
  - Mayor (2020–2026): Michel Doneys
- Area^{1}: 7.54 km^{2} (2.91 sq mi)
- Elevation: 300 m (980 ft)
- Highest elevation: 318 m (1,043 ft)
- Lowest elevation: 204 m (669 ft)
- Population (2023): 82
  - Density: 11/km^{2} (28/sq mi)
- Time zone: UTC+01:00 (CET)
  - Summer (DST): UTC+02:00 (CEST)
- INSEE/Postal code: 32226 /32170
- ^{1} French Land Register data, which excludes lakes, ponds, glaciers > 1 km^{2} (0.386 sq mi or 247 acres) and river estuaries.

Manas-Bastanous (French pronunciation: [manas bastanus]; Gascon: Manàs e Bastanós) is a commune in the Gers department in southwestern France.

== Geography ==
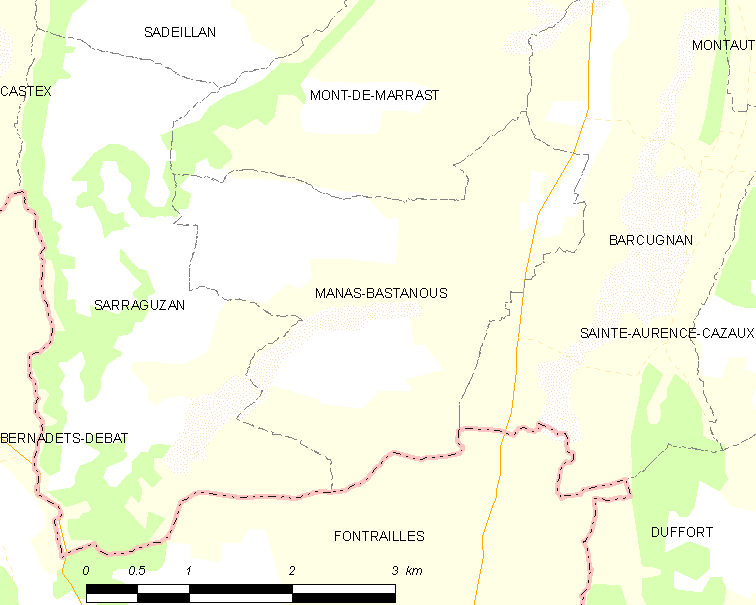
Manas-Bastanous and its surrounding communes

== Population ==
Historical population
Year	Pop.	±% p.a.
1968	139	—
1975	137	−0.21%
1982	125	−1.30%
1990	122	−0.30%
1999	105	−1.65%
2007	104	−0.12%
2012	85	−3.95%
2017	81	−0.96%
2023	82	+0.20%
Source: INSEE

== See also ==
- Communes of the Gers department
