= Betplan =

- Commune
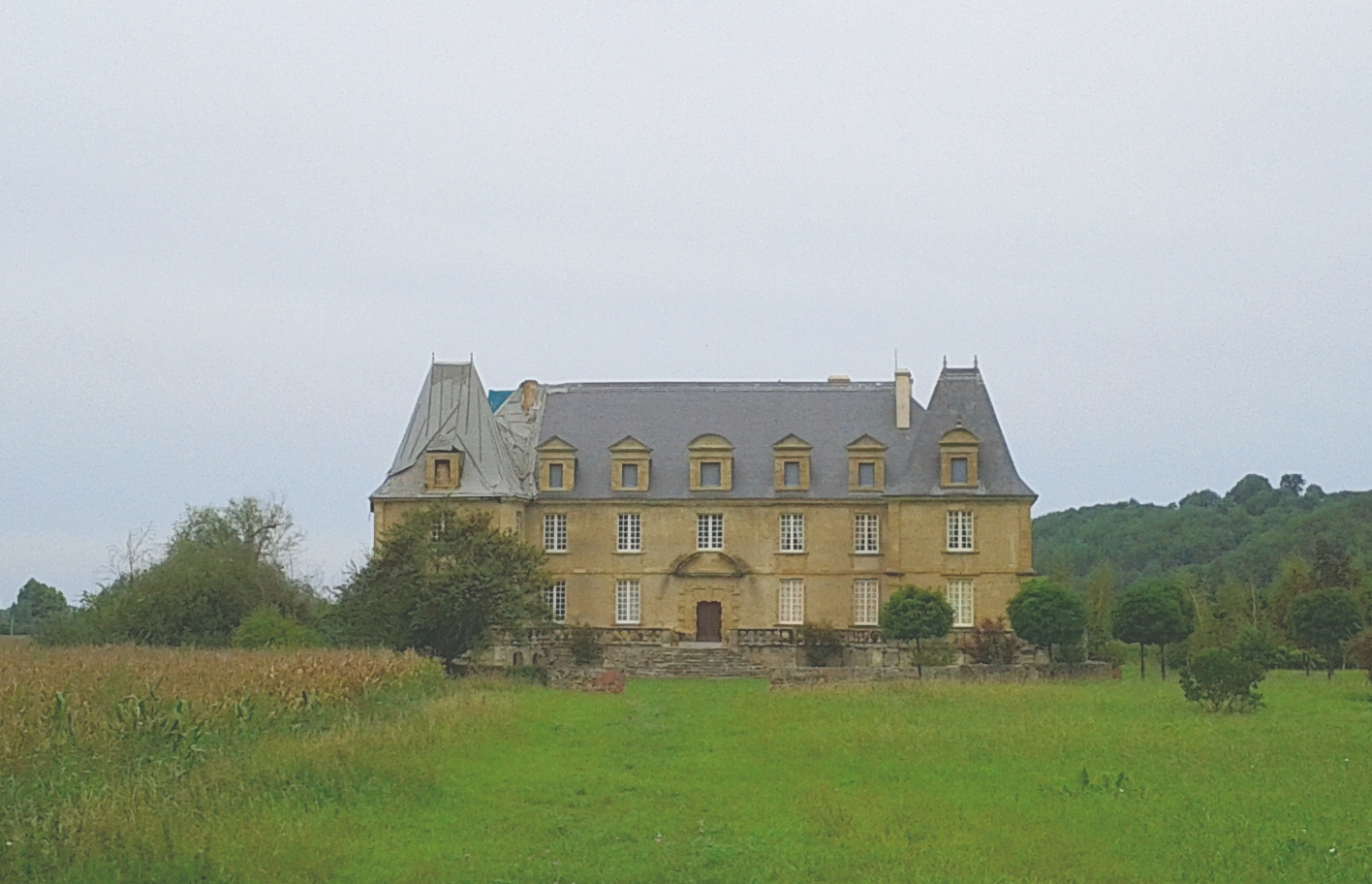
- Chateau
- Location of Betplan
- Location within France Location within Occitanie
- Coordinates: 43°24′51″N 0°12′00″E
- Country: France
- Region: Occitania
- Department: Gers
- Arrondissement: Mirande
- Canton: Mirande-Astarac

Government
  - Mayor (2020–2026): Gérard Tanques
- Area^{1}: 5.46 km^{2} (2.11 sq mi)
- Elevation: 171 m (561 ft)
- Highest elevation: 315 m (1,033 ft)
- Lowest elevation: 168 m (551 ft)
- Population (2023): 104
  - Density: 19.0/km^{2} (49.3/sq mi)
- Time zone: UTC+01:00 (CET)
  - Summer (DST): UTC+02:00 (CEST)
- INSEE/Postal code: 32050 /32730
- ^{1} French Land Register data, which excludes lakes, ponds, glaciers > 1 km^{2} (0.386 sq mi or 247 acres) and river estuaries.

Betplan is a commune in the Gers department in southwestern France.

== Geography ==
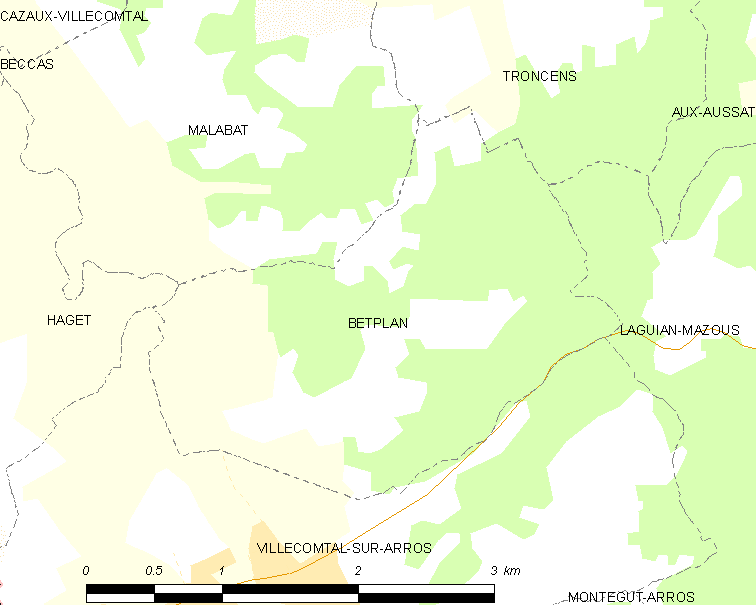
Betplan and its surrounding communes

== Population ==
Historical population
Year	Pop.	±% p.a.
1968	107	—
1975	91	−2.29%
1982	98	+1.06%
1990	120	+2.56%
1999	136	+1.40%
2007	120	−1.55%
2012	107	−2.27%
2017	99	−1.54%
2023	104	+0.82%
Source: INSEE

== See also ==
- Communes of the Gers department
