= Laas, Gers =

Laas
- Commune
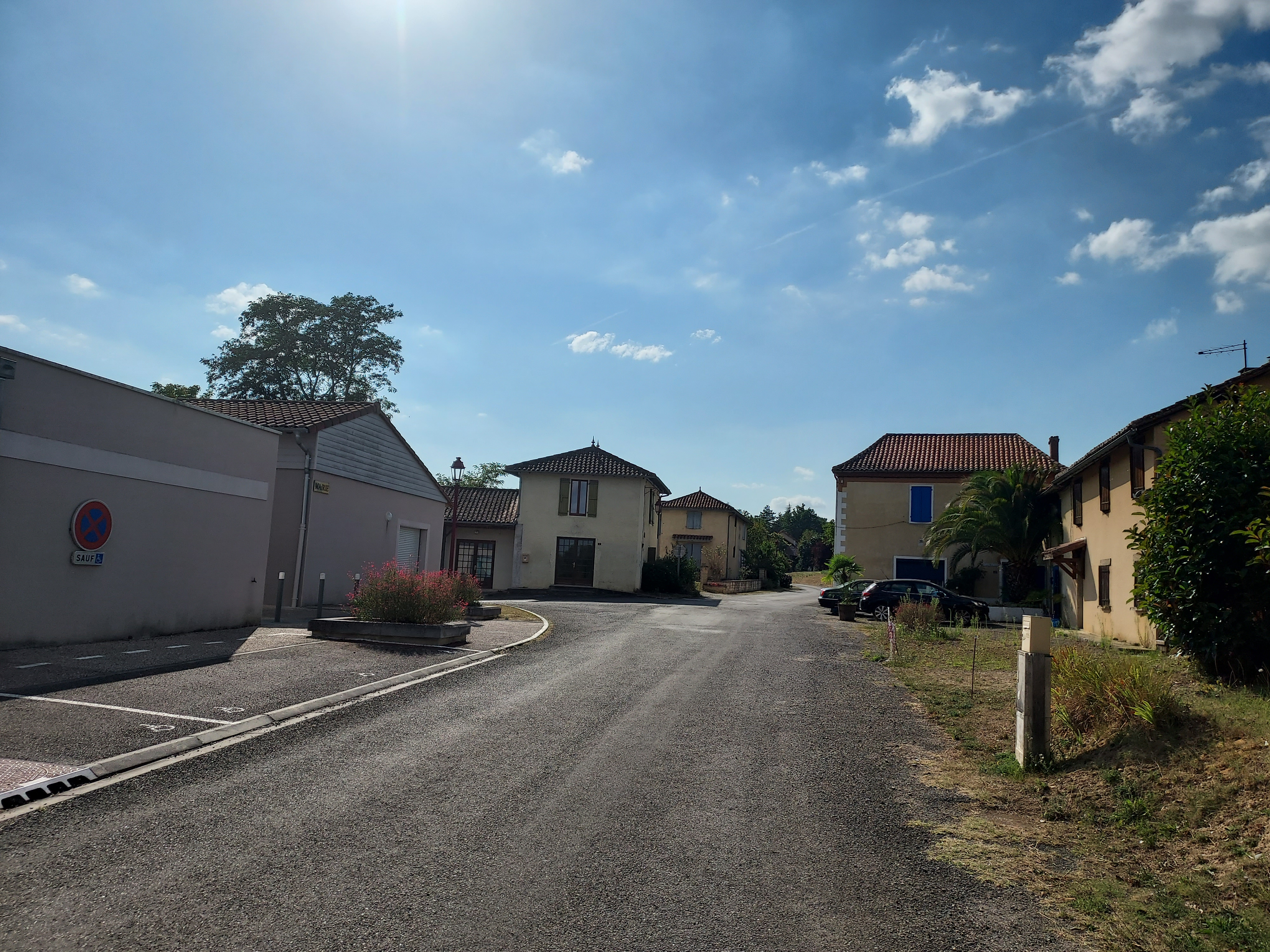
- The village of Laas seen from the east.
- Location of Laas
- Location within France Location within Occitanie
- Coordinates: 43°28′13″N 0°18′42″E
- Country: France
- Region: Occitania
- Department: Gers
- Arrondissement: Mirande
- Canton: Mirande-Astarac
- Intercommunality: Cœur d'Astarac en Gascogne

Government
  - Mayor (2020–2026): Muriel Larrieu
- Area^{1}: 10.94 km^{2} (4.22 sq mi)
- Elevation: 205 m (673 ft)
- Highest elevation: 286 m (938 ft)
- Lowest elevation: 176 m (577 ft)
- Population (2023): 310
  - Density: 28/km^{2} (73/sq mi)
- Time zone: UTC+01:00 (CET)
  - Summer (DST): UTC+02:00 (CEST)
- INSEE/Postal code: 32167 /32170
- ^{1} French Land Register data, which excludes lakes, ponds, glaciers > 1 km^{2} (0.386 sq mi or 247 acres) and river estuaries.

Laas (French pronunciation: [las]; Occitan: Las) is a commune in the Gers department in southwestern France.

== Geography ==
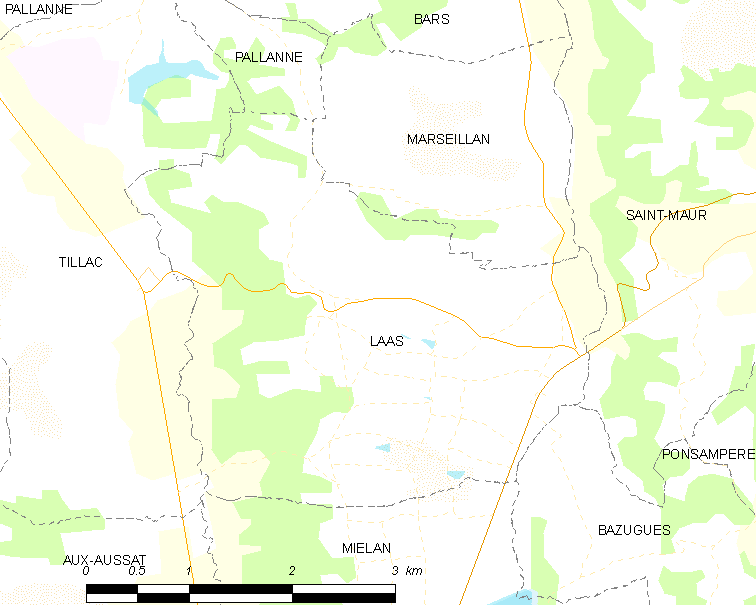
Laas and its surrounding communes

== Population ==
Historical population
Year	Pop.	±% p.a.
1968	286	—
1975	241	−2.42%
1982	244	+0.18%
1990	212	−1.74%
1999	237	+1.25%
2007	291	+2.60%
2012	300	+0.61%
2017	298	−0.13%
2023	310	+0.66%
Source: INSEE

== See also ==
- Communes of the Gers department
