= Barcugnan =

- Commune
- Location of Barcugnan
- Location within France Location within Occitanie
- Coordinates: 43°22′47″N 0°24′25″E
- Country: France
- Region: Occitania
- Department: Gers
- Arrondissement: Mirande
- Canton: Mirande-Astarac
- Intercommunality: Astarac Arros en Gascogne

Government
  - Mayor (2020–2026): Olivier Vendome
- Area^{1}: 9.11 km^{2} (3.52 sq mi)
- Highest elevation: 311 m (1,020 ft)
- Lowest elevation: 190 m (620 ft)
- Population (2023): 104
  - Density: 11.4/km^{2} (29.6/sq mi)
- Time zone: UTC+01:00 (CET)
  - Summer (DST): UTC+02:00 (CEST)
- INSEE/Postal code: 32028 /32170
- ^{1} French Land Register data, which excludes lakes, ponds, glaciers > 1 km^{2} (0.386 sq mi or 247 acres) and river estuaries.

Barcugnan (French pronunciation: [baʁkyɲɑ̃]; Occitan: Barcunhan) is a commune in the Gers department in southwestern France.

== Geography ==
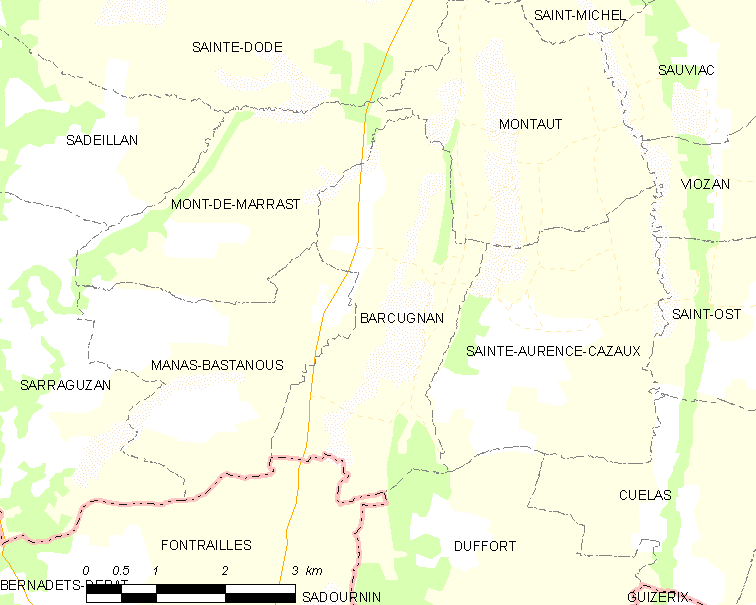
Barcugnan and its surrounding communes

== Population ==
Historical population
Year	Pop.	±% p.a.
1968	228	—
1975	192	−2.43%
1982	169	−1.81%
1990	164	−0.37%
1999	143	−1.51%
2007	149	+0.52%
2012	112	−5.55%
2017	107	−0.91%
2023	104	−0.47%
Source: INSEE

== See also ==
- Communes of the Gers department
