= Estampes, Gers =

Estampes
- Commune
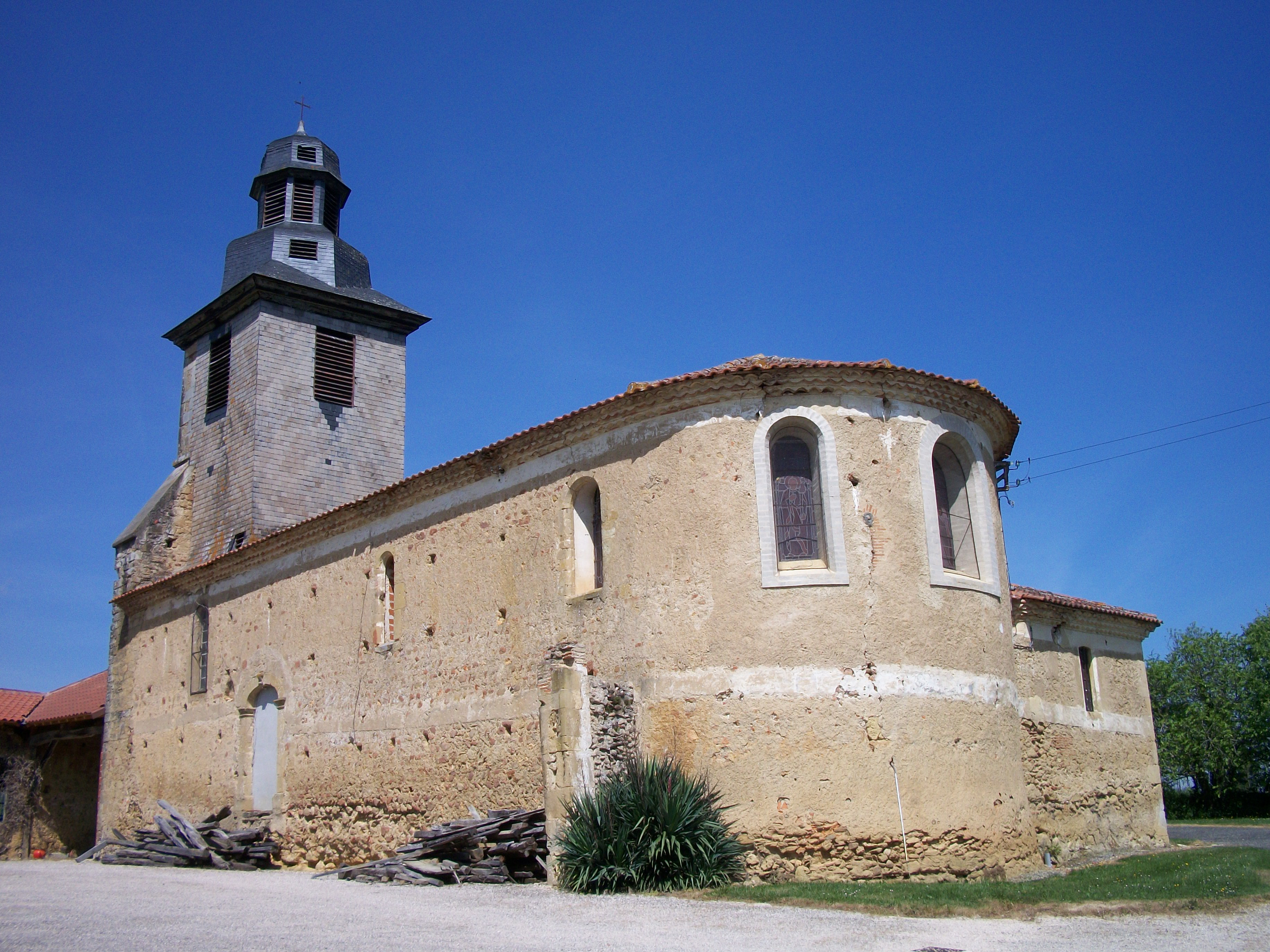
- The church in Estampes

- Coat of arms
- Location of Estampes
- Location within France Location within Occitanie
- Coordinates: 43°23′53″N 0°16′37″E
- Country: France
- Region: Occitania
- Department: Gers
- Arrondissement: Mirande
- Canton: Mirande-Astarac

Government
  - Mayor (2020–2026): Christian Abadie
- Area^{1}: 10.82 km^{2} (4.18 sq mi)
- Elevation: 259 m (850 ft)
- Highest elevation: 339 m (1,112 ft)
- Lowest elevation: 203 m (666 ft)
- Population (2023): 162
  - Density: 15.0/km^{2} (38.8/sq mi)
- Time zone: UTC+01:00 (CET)
  - Summer (DST): UTC+02:00 (CEST)
- INSEE/Postal code: 32126 /32170
- ^{1} French Land Register data, which excludes lakes, ponds, glaciers > 1 km^{2} (0.386 sq mi or 247 acres) and river estuaries.

Estampes (French pronunciation: [ɛstɑ̃p]; Occitan: Estampas e Castèthfranc) is a commune in the Gers department in southwestern France.

== Geography ==
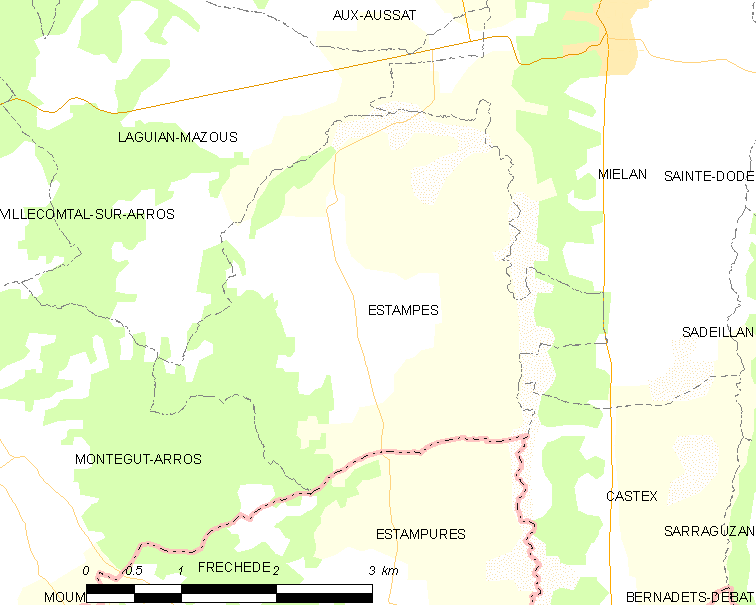
Estampes and its surrounding communes

== Population ==
Historical population
Year	Pop.	±% p.a.
1968	274	—
1975	237	−2.05%
1982	207	−1.91%
1990	189	−1.13%
1999	173	−0.98%
2007	171	−0.15%
2012	165	−0.71%
2017	159	−0.74%
2023	162	+0.31%
Source: INSEE

== See also ==
- Communes of the Gers department
