= Clermont-Pouyguillès =

French commune

- Commune
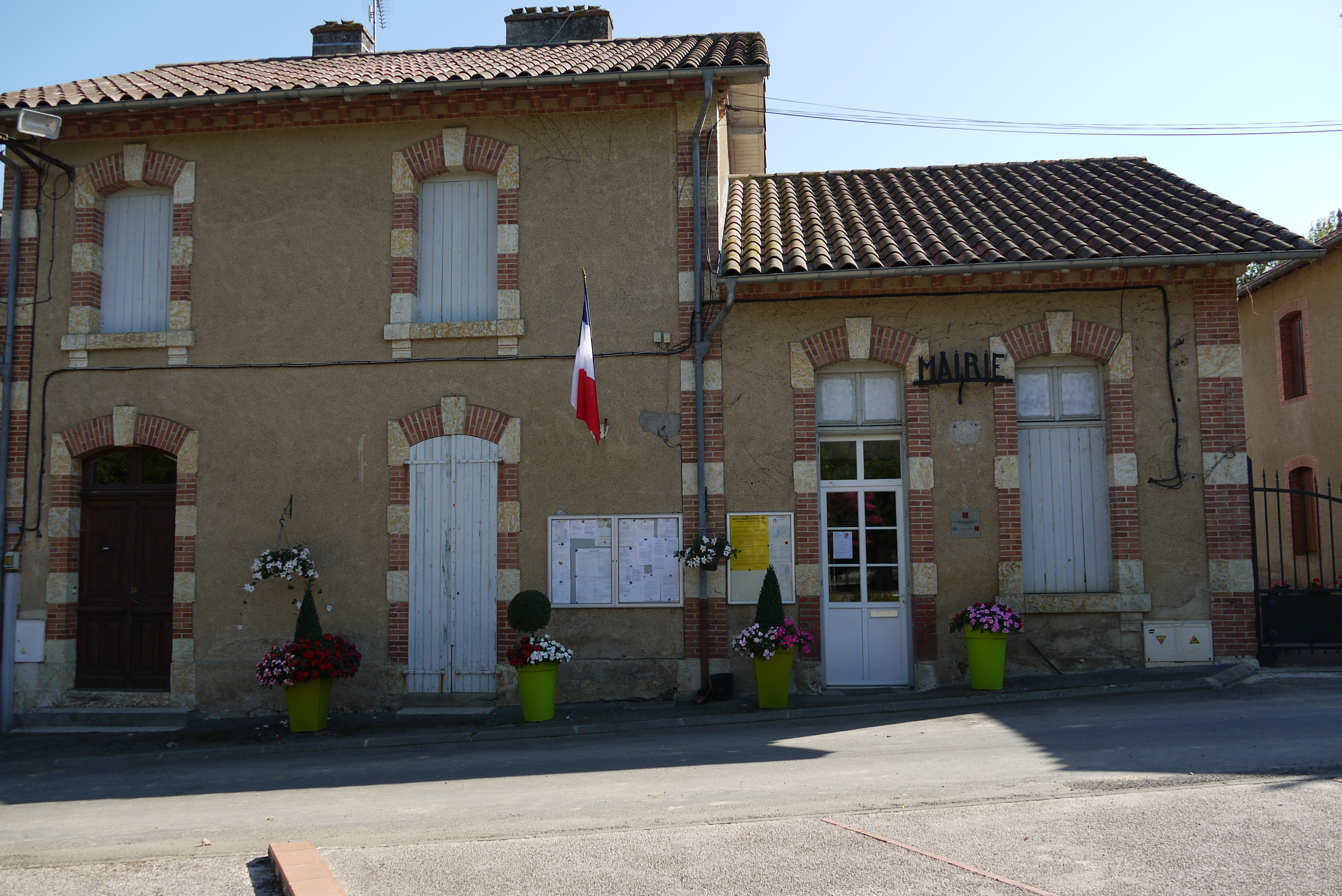
- The town hall in Clermont-Pouyguillès
- Location of Clermont-Pouyguillès
- Location within France Location within Occitanie
- Coordinates: 43°28′19″N 0°31′25″E
- Country: France
- Region: Occitania
- Department: Gers
- Arrondissement: Mirande
- Canton: Mirande-Astarac

Government
  - Mayor (2020–2026): Francis Dupouey
- Area^{1}: 12.71 km^{2} (4.91 sq mi)
- Elevation: 193 m (633 ft)
- Highest elevation: 281 m (922 ft)
- Lowest elevation: 181 m (594 ft)
- Population (2023): 164
  - Density: 12.9/km^{2} (33.4/sq mi)
- Time zone: UTC+01:00 (CET)
  - Summer (DST): UTC+02:00 (CEST)
- INSEE/Postal code: 32104 /32300
- ^{1} French Land Register data, which excludes lakes, ponds, glaciers > 1 km^{2} (0.386 sq mi or 247 acres) and river estuaries.

Clermont-Pouyguillès is a commune in the Gers department in southwestern France.

== Geography ==
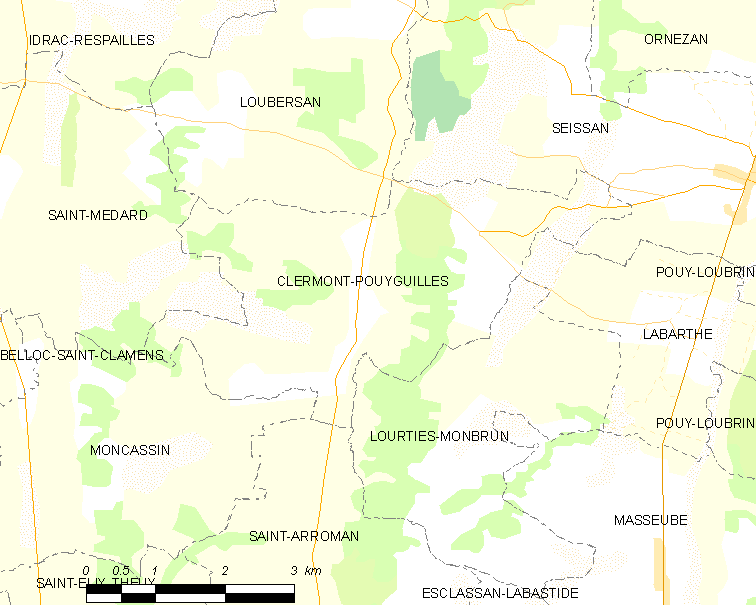
Clermont-Pouyguillès and its surrounding communes

== Population ==
Historical population
Year	Pop.	±% p.a.
1968	165	—
1975	144	−1.93%
1982	153	+0.87%
1990	158	+0.40%
1999	158	+0.00%
2007	154	−0.32%
2012	161	+0.89%
2017	159	−0.25%
2023	164	+0.52%
Source: INSEE

== See also ==
- Communes of the Gers department
