= Ladevèze-Ville =

- Commune
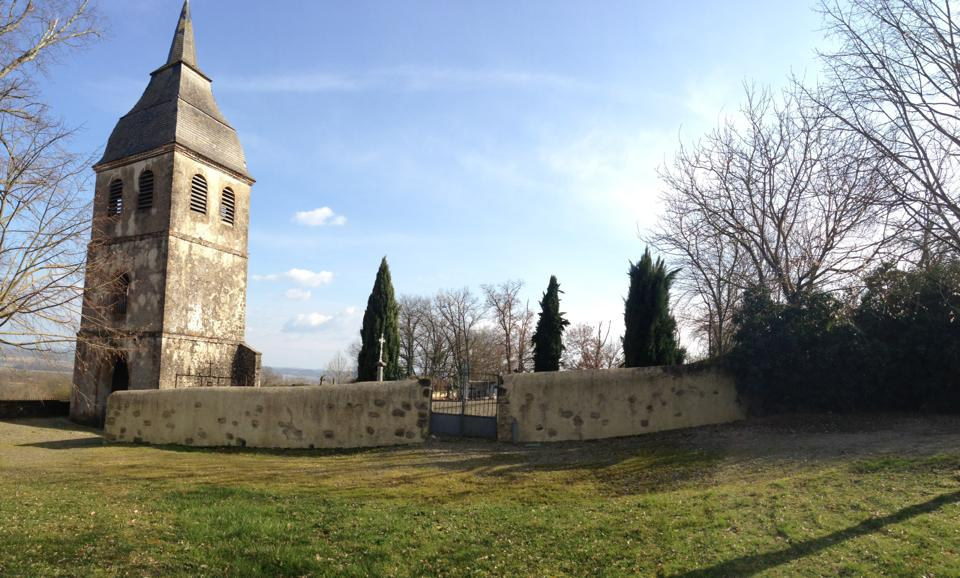
- Bell tower

- Coat of arms
- Location of Ladevèze-Ville
- Location within France Location within Occitanie
- Coordinates: 43°32′13″N 0°03′32″E
- Country: France
- Region: Occitania
- Department: Gers
- Arrondissement: Mirande
- Canton: Pardiac-Rivière-Basse
- Intercommunality: Bastides et vallons du Gers

Government
  - Mayor (2020–2026): Sylvie Theye
- Area^{1}: 9.09 km^{2} (3.51 sq mi)
- Elevation: 242 m (794 ft)
- Highest elevation: 254 m (833 ft)
- Lowest elevation: 143 m (469 ft)
- Population (2023): 213
  - Density: 23.4/km^{2} (60.7/sq mi)
- Time zone: UTC+01:00 (CET)
  - Summer (DST): UTC+02:00 (CEST)
- INSEE/Postal code: 32175 /32230
- ^{1} French Land Register data, which excludes lakes, ponds, glaciers > 1 km^{2} (0.386 sq mi or 247 acres) and river estuaries.

Ladevèze-Ville (French pronunciation: [ladvɛz vil]; Occitan: La Devesa Vila) is a commune in the Gers department in southwestern France.

== Geography ==
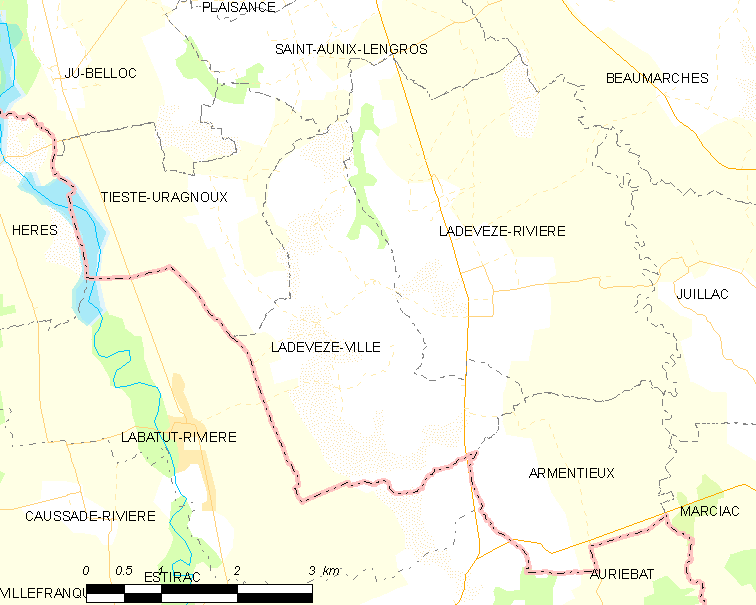
Ladevèze-Ville and its surrounding communes

The commune is bordered by five other communes, four of them is in Gers, and one in Hautes-Pyrénées: Tieste-Uragnoux to the northwest, Saint-Aunix-Lengros to the north, Ladevèze-Rivière to the northeast, Armentieux to the southeast, and finally by the department of Hautes-Pyrénées to the southwest by the commune of Labatut-Rivière to the southwest.

== Population ==
Historical population
Year	Pop.	±% p.a.
1968	241	—
1975	281	+2.22%
1982	254	−1.43%
1990	250	−0.20%
1999	249	−0.04%
2007	263	+0.69%
2012	266	+0.23%
2017	236	−2.36%
2023	213	−1.69%
Source: INSEE

== See also ==
- Communes of the Gers department
