= Tasque (software) =

Open source task management software

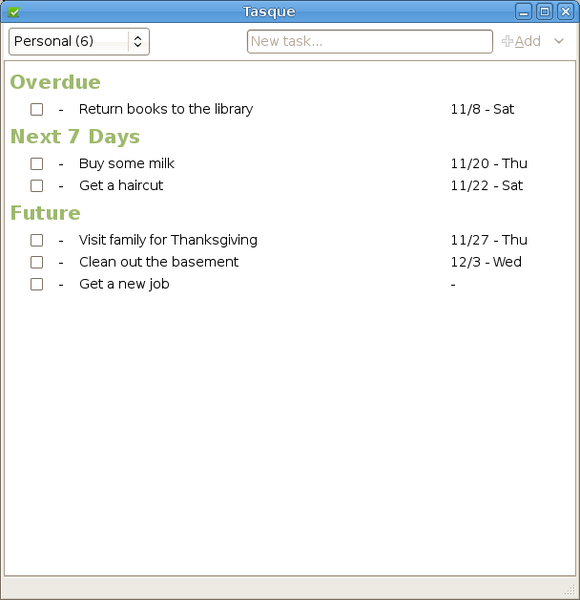
- Stable release: 0.1.12.2 (Windows); 0.1.12 (Other platforms) / March 6, 2013; 12 years ago (Windows); October 29, 2012; 13 years ago (Other platforms)
- Repository: gitlab.gnome.org/Archive/tasque.git
- License: MIT License
- Website: wiki.gnome.org/Attic/Tasque

Tasque is an unmaintained open source task management application, part of the GNOME community. Its name was partially inspired by the French village by the same spelling. "Tasque" in French is pronounced the same as the word "task" is in English. It is released under the MIT License.

As of 2018, Tasque is listed as an inactive, archived project.
