= Préchac =

Préchac is the name of several communes in France:

- Préchac, Gers
- Préchac, Gironde
- Préchac, Hautes-Pyrénées
- Préchac-sur-Adour, Gers

== See also ==
- Préchacq (disambiguation)
