= Ségos =

- Commune
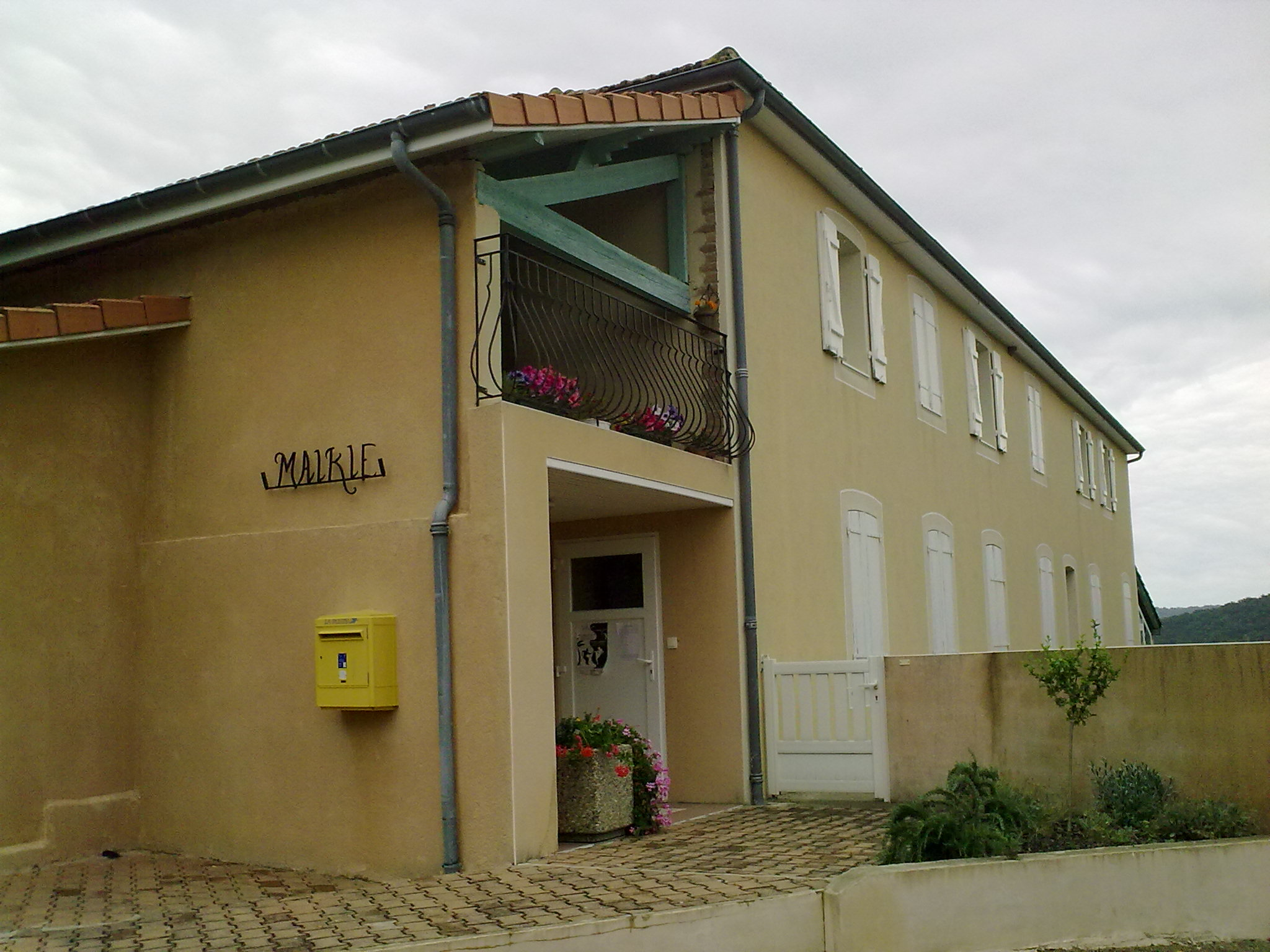
- The town hall in Ségos

- Coat of arms
- Location of Ségos
- Location within France Location within Occitanie
- Coordinates: 43°37′33″N 0°15′21″W
- Country: France
- Region: Occitania
- Department: Gers
- Arrondissement: Mirande
- Canton: Adour-Gersoise

Government
  - Mayor (2020–2026): Philippe Silveira Morais
- Area^{1}: 8.67 km^{2} (3.35 sq mi)
- Elevation: −110 m (−360 ft)
- Highest elevation: −184 m (−604 ft)
- Lowest elevation: −91 m (−299 ft)
- Population (2023): 256
  - Density: 29.5/km^{2} (76.5/sq mi)
- Time zone: UTC+01:00 (CET)
  - Summer (DST): UTC+02:00 (CEST)
- INSEE/Postal code: 32424 /32400
- ^{1} French Land Register data, which excludes lakes, ponds, glaciers > 1 km^{2} (0.386 sq mi or 247 acres) and river estuaries.

Ségos (French pronunciation: [seɡɔs]; Gascon: Segòs) is a commune in the Gers department in southwestern France.

== Geography ==
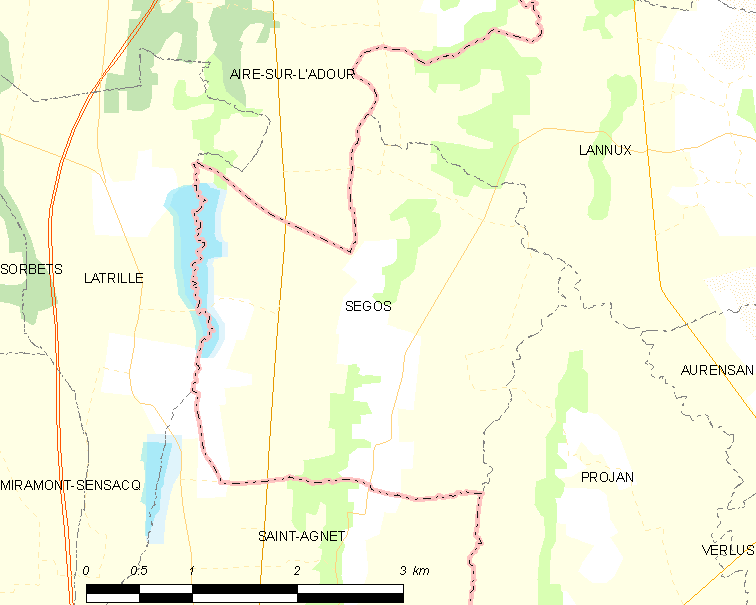
Ségos and its surrounding communes

Ségos is a commune located in the Tursan wine region, on the Broussau hill.

The commune borders the Landes department and is close to the Pyrénées-Atlantiques department.

The neighbouring communes are Aire-sur-l'Adour, Lannux, Latrille, Projan and Saint-Agnet.

== Heraldry ==
Arms of Ségos	Quartered per saltire: 1st gules a cross clechée, voided and pommée of twelve pieces or, 2nd vert an ear of corn or, 3rd vert a duck or, 4th argent a cedar vert trunked tenné. Created by JF Binon. Local Authority Directory website, 2025.

== Population ==
Historical population
Year	Pop.	±% p.a.
1968	304	—
1975	276	−1.37%
1982	272	−0.21%
1990	248	−1.15%
1999	234	−0.64%
2007	252	+0.93%
2012	245	−0.56%
2017	229	−1.34%
2023	256	+1.87%
Source: INSEE

== See also ==
- Communes of the Gers department
