= Monclar =

Monclar is the name or part of the name of the following communes in France:

- Monclar, Gers, in the Gers department
- Monclar, Lot-et-Garonne, in the Lot-et-Garonne department
- Monclar-de-Quercy, in the Tarn-et-Garonne department
- Monclar-sur-Losse, in the Gers department

Monclar is also the pseudonym of Raoul Magrin-Vernerey
