= Saint-Justin =

Saint-Justin is the name of several places:

== Canada ==
- Saint-Justin, Quebec

== France ==
- Saint-Justin, in the Gers department
- Saint-Justin, in the Landes department
