= Beaumarchés =

- Commune
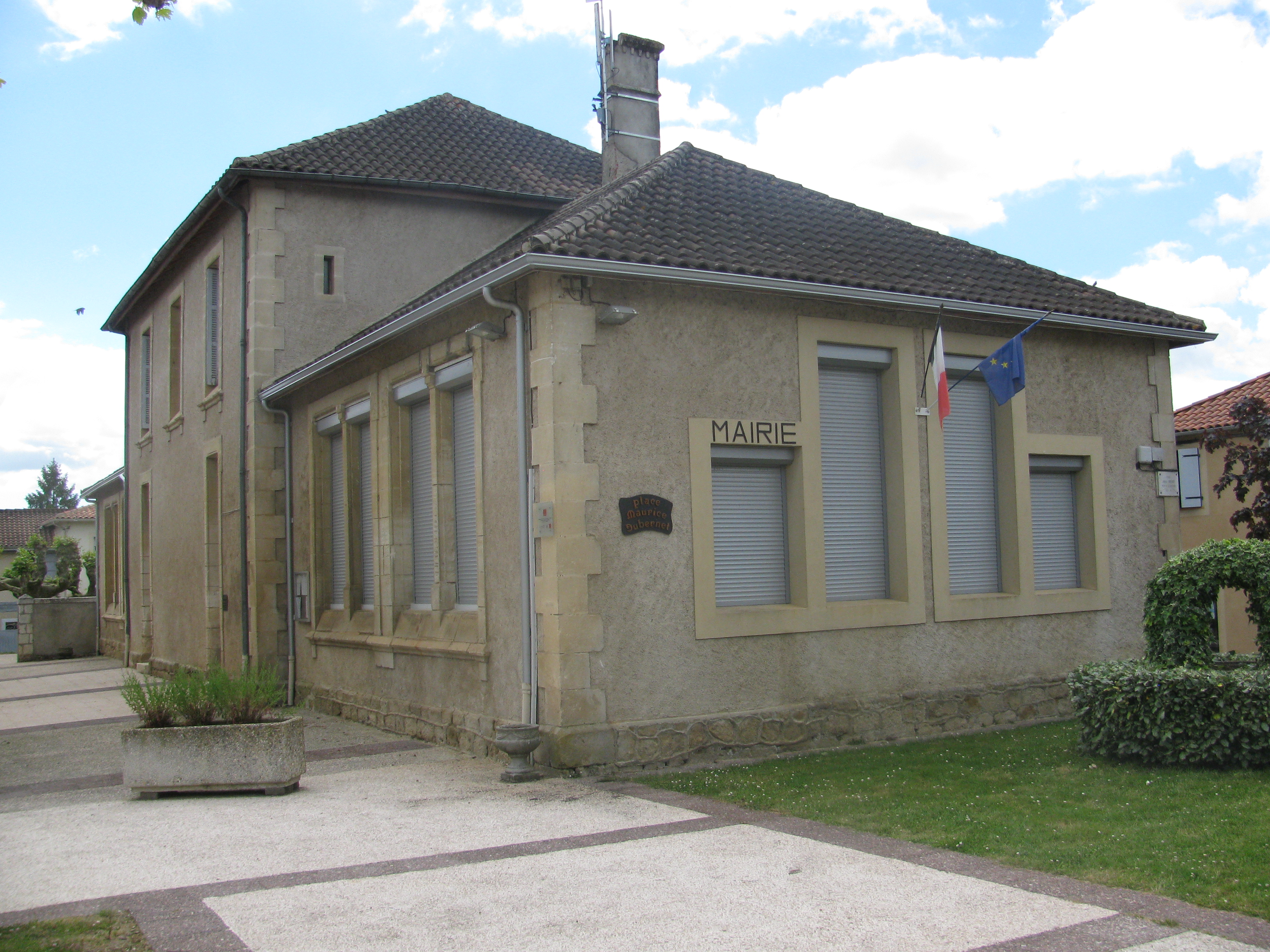
- The town hall in Beaumarchés

- Coat of arms
- Location of Beaumarchés
- Location within France Location within Occitanie
- Coordinates: 43°35′12″N 0°05′26″E
- Country: France
- Region: Occitania
- Department: Gers
- Arrondissement: Mirande
- Canton: Pardiac-Rivière-Basse

Government
  - Mayor (2020–2026): Gérard Castet
- Area^{1}: 32.47 km^{2} (12.54 sq mi)
- Elevation: 177 m (581 ft)
- Highest elevation: 246 m (807 ft)
- Lowest elevation: 129 m (423 ft)
- Population (2023): 689
  - Density: 21.2/km^{2} (55.0/sq mi)
- Time zone: UTC+01:00 (CET)
  - Summer (DST): UTC+02:00 (CEST)
- INSEE/Postal code: 32036 /32160
- ^{1} French Land Register data, which excludes lakes, ponds, glaciers > 1 km^{2} (0.386 sq mi or 247 acres) and river estuaries.

Beaumarchés (French pronunciation: [bomaʁʃe]; Occitan: Bèumarchés) is a commune in the Gers department in southwestern France.

== Geography ==
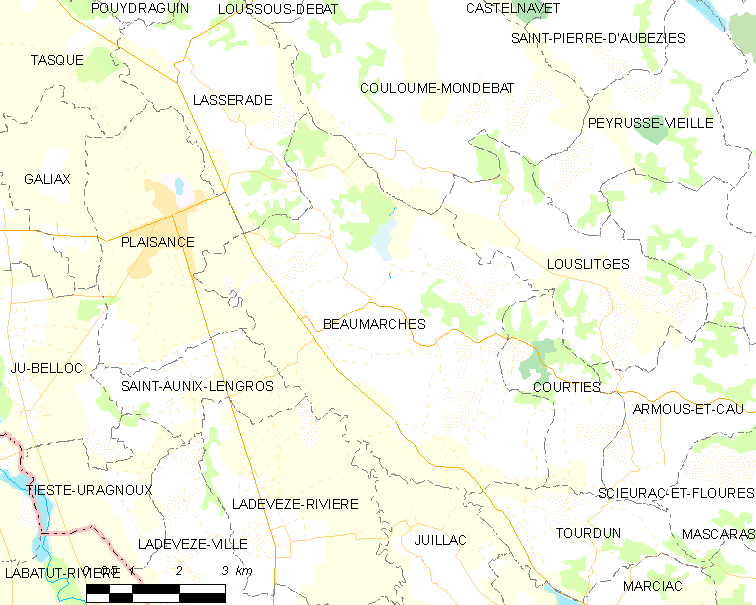
Beaumarchés and its surrounding communes

== Population ==
Historical population
Year	Pop.	±% p.a.
1968	620	—
1975	544	−1.85%
1982	548	+0.10%
1990	549	+0.02%
1999	588	+0.77%
2007	663	+1.51%
2012	679	+0.48%
2017	664	−0.45%
2023	689	+0.62%
Source: INSEE

== See also ==
- Communes of the Gers department
- Celui d'Evy
