= Arrondissement of Mirande =

Coordinates: 43°31′N 0°24′E

Mirande
- Arrondissement
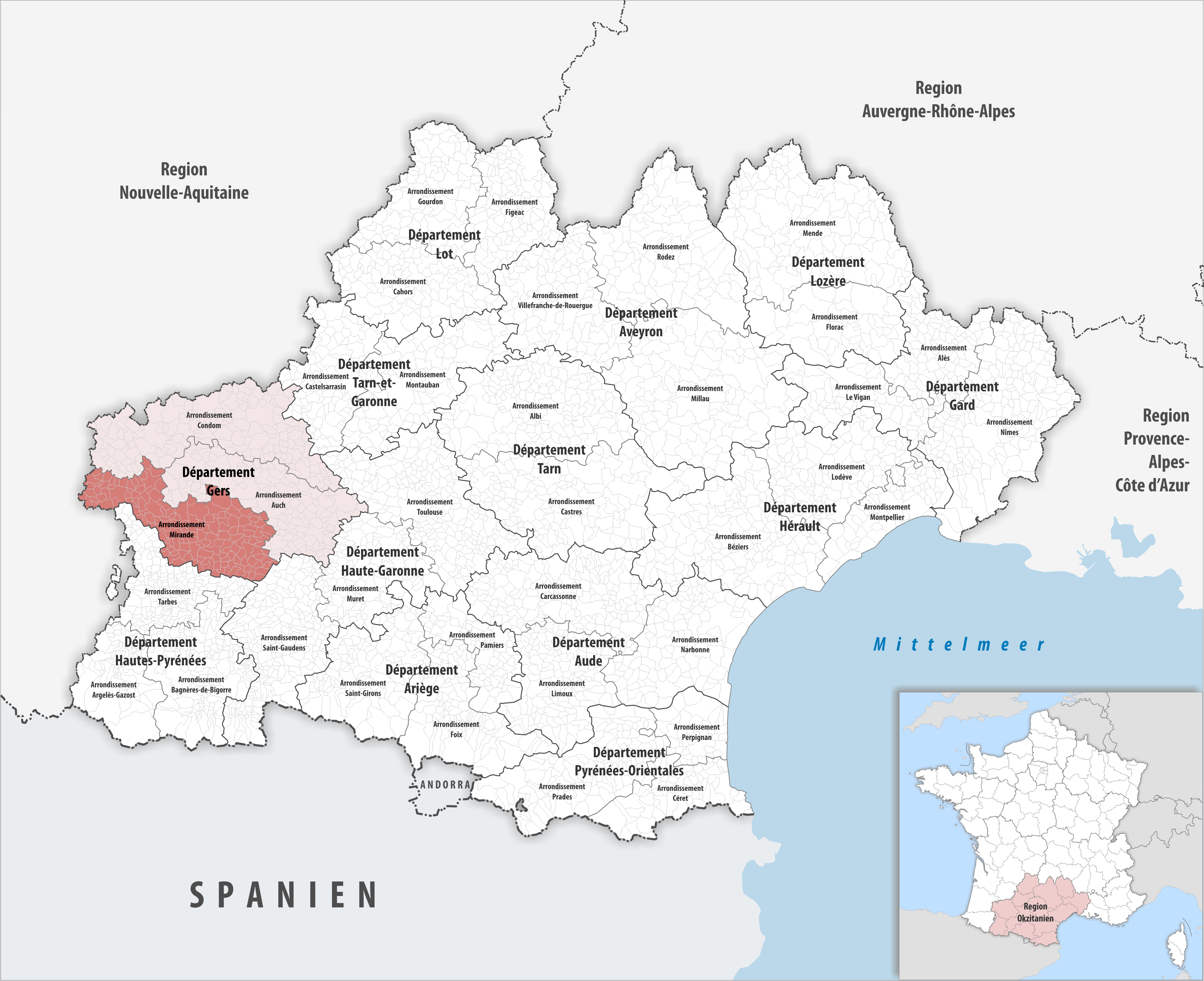
- Location within the region Occitanie
- Country: France
- Region: Occitania
- Department: Gers
- No. of communes: {{{nbcomm}}}
- Area: 1,871.2 km^{2} (722.5 sq mi)
- Population (2023): 41,216
  - Density: 22.027/km^{2} (57.048/sq mi)
- INSEE code: 323

The arrondissement of Mirande is an arrondissement of France in the Gers department in the Occitanie region. It has 162 communes. Its population is 41,316 (2021), and its area is 1,871.2 km^{2} (722.5 sq mi).

== Composition ==
The communes of the arrondissement of Mirande, and their INSEE codes, are:

1. Aignan (32001)
2. Arblade-le-Bas (32004)
3. Armentieux (32008)
4. Armous-et-Cau (32009)
5. Arrouède (32010)
6. Aujan-Mournède (32015)
7. Aurensan (32017)
8. Aussos (32468)
9. Aux-Aussat (32020)
10. Avéron-Bergelle (32022)
11. Barcelonne-du-Gers (32027)
12. Barcugnan (32028)
13. Barran (32029)
14. Bars (32030)
15. Bassoues (32032)
16. Bazugues (32034)
17. Beaumarchés (32036)
18. Beccas (32039)
19. Bellegarde (32041)
20. Belloc-Saint-Clamens (32042)
21. Berdoues (32045)
22. Bernède (32046)
23. Betplan (32050)
24. Bézues-Bajon (32053)
25. Blousson-Sérian (32058)
26. Boucagnères (32060)
27. Bouzon-Gellenave (32063)
28. Le Brouilh-Monbert (32065)
29. Cahuzac-sur-Adour (32070)
30. Cap d'Astarac (32365)
31. Castelnau-d'Anglès (32077)
32. Castelnavet (32081)
33. Castex (32086)
34. Caumont (32093)
35. Cazaux-Villecomtal (32099)
36. Chélan (32103)
37. Clermont-Pouyguillès (32104)
38. Corneillan (32108)
39. Couloumé-Mondebat (32109)
40. Courties (32111)
41. Cuélas (32114)
42. Duffort (32116)
43. Durban (32118)
44. Esclassan-Labastide (32122)
45. Estampes (32126)
46. Estipouy (32128)
47. Faget-Abbatial (32130)
48. Fustérouau (32135)
49. Galiax (32136)
50. Gée-Rivière (32145)
51. Goux (32151)
52. Haget (32152)
53. Haulies (32153)
54. Idrac-Respaillès (32156)
55. L'Isle-de-Noé (32159)
56. Izotges (32161)
57. Jû-Belloc (32163)
58. Juillac (32164)
59. Laas (32167)
60. Labarthe (32169)
61. Labarthète (32170)
62. Labéjan (32172)
63. Ladevèze-Rivière (32174)
64. Ladevèze-Ville (32175)
65. Lagarde-Hachan (32177)
66. Laguian-Mazous (32181)
67. Lalanne-Arqué (32185)
68. Lamaguère (32186)
69. Lamazère (32187)
70. Lannux (32192)
71. Lasséran (32200)
72. Lasserrade (32199)
73. Lasseube-Propre (32201)
74. Laveraët (32205)
75. Lelin-Lapujolle (32209)
76. Loubersan (32215)
77. Lourties-Monbrun (32216)
78. Louslitges (32217)
79. Loussous-Débat (32218)
80. Malabat (32225)
81. Manas-Bastanous (32226)
82. Manent-Montané (32228)
83. Marciac (32233)
84. Margouët-Meymes (32235)
85. Marseillan (32238)
86. Mascaras (32240)
87. Masseube (32242)
88. Maulichères (32244)
89. Maumusson-Laguian (32245)
90. Meilhan (32250)
91. Miélan (32252)
92. Miramont-d'Astarac (32254)
93. Mirande (32256)
94. Moncassin (32263)
95. Monclar-sur-Losse (32265)
96. Moncorneil-Grazan (32266)
97. Monferran-Plavès (32267)
98. Monlaur-Bernet (32272)
99. Monlezun (32273)
100. Monpardiac (32275)
101. Montaut (32278)
102. Mont-d'Astarac (32280)
103. Mont-de-Marrast (32281)
104. Montégut-Arros (32283)
105. Montesquiou (32285)
106. Monties (32287)
107. Mouchès (32293)
108. Orbessan (32300)
109. Ornézan (32302)
110. Pallanne (32303)
111. Panassac (32304)
112. Plaisance (32319)
113. Ponsampère (32323)
114. Ponsan-Soubiran (32324)
115. Pouydraguin (32325)
116. Pouylebon (32326)
117. Pouy-Loubrin (32327)
118. Préchac-sur-Adour (32330)
119. Projan (32333)
120. Ricourt (32342)
121. Riscle (32344)
122. Sabazan (32354)
123. Sadeillan (32355)
124. Saint-Arroman (32361)
125. Saint-Aunix-Lengros (32362)
126. Saint-Christaud (32367)
127. Sainte-Aurence-Cazaux (32363)
128. Sainte-Dode (32373)
129. Saint-Élix-Theux (32375)
130. Saint-Germé (32378)
131. Saint-Jean-le-Comtal (32381)
132. Saint-Justin (32383)
133. Saint-Martin (32389)
134. Saint-Maur (32393)
135. Saint-Médard (32394)
136. Saint-Michel (32397)
137. Saint-Mont (32398)
138. Saint-Ost (32401)
139. Samaran (32409)
140. Sansan (32411)
141. Sarragachies (32414)
142. Sarraguzan (32415)
143. Sauviac (32419)
144. Scieurac-et-Flourès (32422)
145. Ségos (32424)
146. Seissan (32426)
147. Sembouès (32427)
148. Sère (32430)
149. Tachoires (32438)
150. Tarsac (32439)
151. Tasque (32440)
152. Termes-d'Armagnac (32443)
153. Tieste-Uragnoux (32445)
154. Tillac (32446)
155. Tourdun (32450)
156. Traversères (32454)
157. Troncens (32455)
158. Vergoignan (32460)
159. Verlus (32461)
160. Viella (32463)
161. Villecomtal-sur-Arros (32464)
162. Viozan (32466)

== History ==
The arrondissement of Mirande was created in 1800. At the January 2017 reorganisation of the arrondissements of Gers, it gained 21 communes from the arrondissement of Auch, and it lost five communes to the arrondissement of Auch.

As a result of the reorganisation of the cantons of France which came into effect in 2015, the borders of the cantons are no longer related to the borders of the arrondissements. The cantons of the arrondissement of Mirande were, as of January 2015:

1. Aignan
2. Marciac
3. Masseube
4. Miélan
5. Mirande
6. Montesquiou
7. Plaisance
8. Riscle
