= Tillac =

- Commune
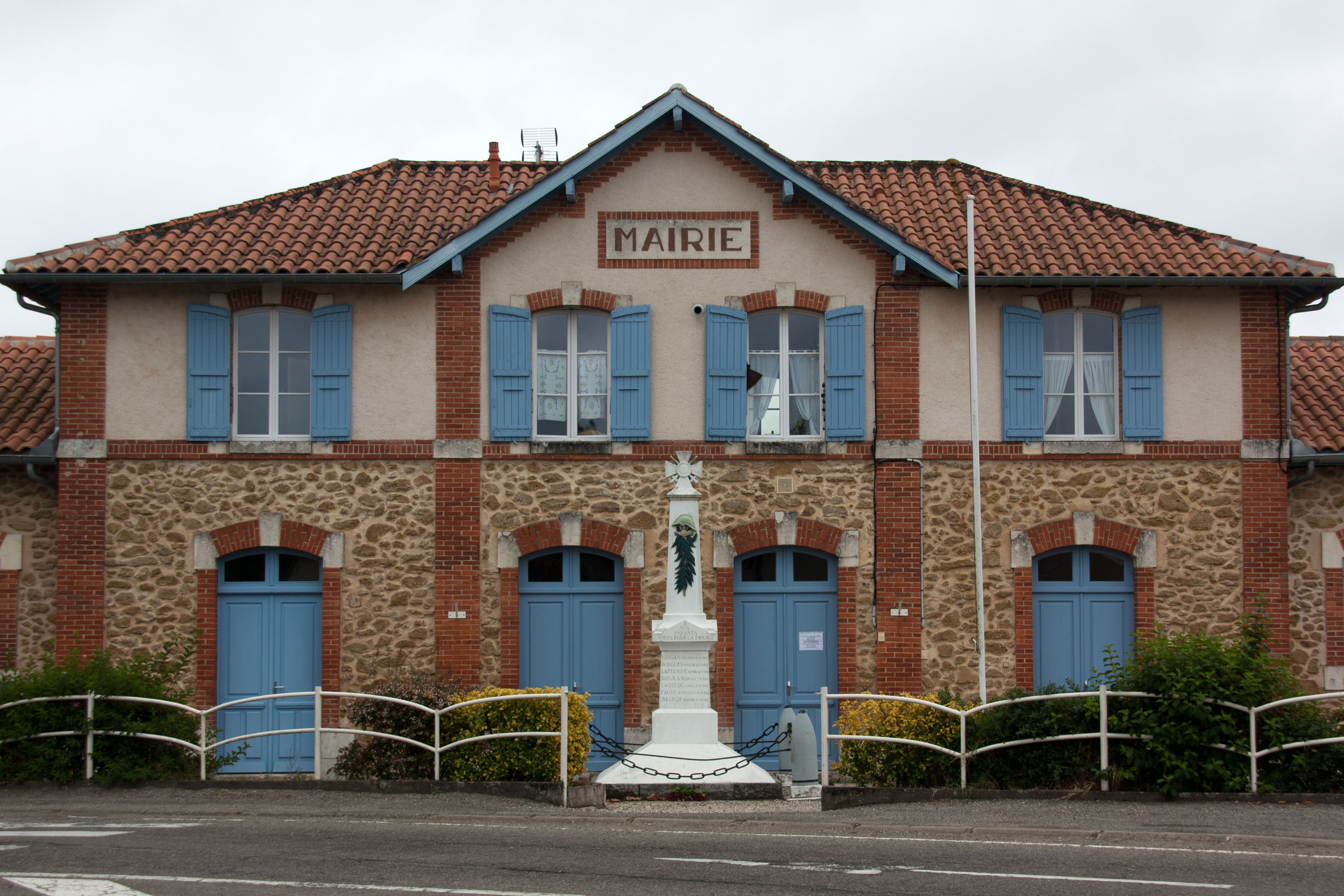
- The town hall in Tillac
- Location of Tillac
- Location within France Location within Occitanie
- Coordinates: 43°28′34″N 0°16′35″E
- Country: France
- Region: Occitania
- Department: Gers
- Arrondissement: Mirande
- Canton: Pardiac-Rivière-Basse
- Intercommunality: Bastides et vallons du Gers

Government
  - Mayor (2020–2026): Alain Audirac
- Area^{1}: 12.47 km^{2} (4.81 sq mi)
- Elevation: 160 m (520 ft)
- Highest elevation: 264 m (866 ft)
- Lowest elevation: 170 m (560 ft)
- Population (2023): 281
  - Density: 22.5/km^{2} (58.4/sq mi)
- Time zone: UTC+01:00 (CET)
  - Summer (DST): UTC+02:00 (CEST)
- INSEE/Postal code: 32446 /32170
- ^{1} French Land Register data, which excludes lakes, ponds, glaciers > 1 km^{2} (0.386 sq mi or 247 acres) and river estuaries.

Tillac (French pronunciation: [tijak]; Occitan: Tilhac) is a commune in the Gers department in southwestern France.

== Geography ==
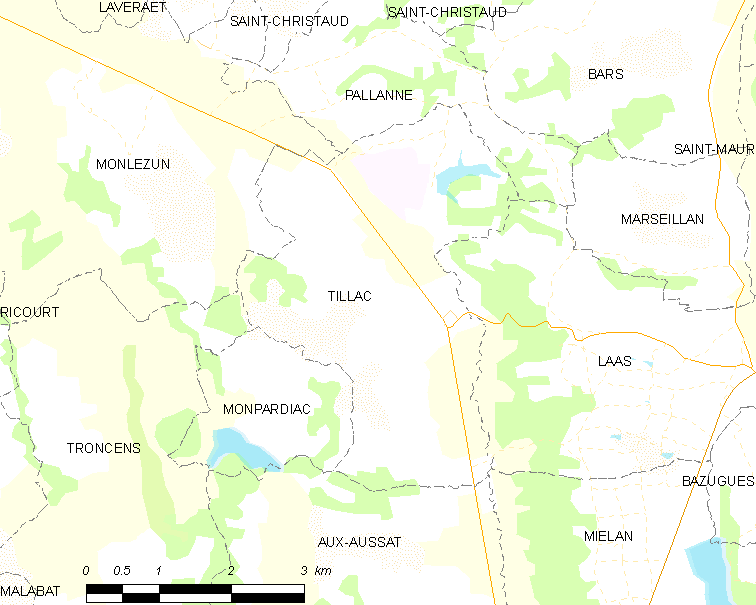
Tillac and its surrounding communes

== Demography ==
Historical population
Year	Pop.	±% p.a.
1968	346	—
1975	315	−1.33%
1982	320	+0.23%
1990	302	−0.72%
1999	295	−0.26%
2007	258	−1.66%
2012	257	−0.08%
2017	281	+1.80%
2023	281	+0.00%
Source: INSEE

== Economy ==
- Agriculture: sunflower, corn
- 1 gîte: Cap de Boueou (bouéou = ox in Gascon dialect) - Vacation rental in an 18th-century farmhouse.

== See also ==
- Communes of the Gers department
