= Castelnau-d'Anglès =

Castelnau-d’Anglès
- Commune
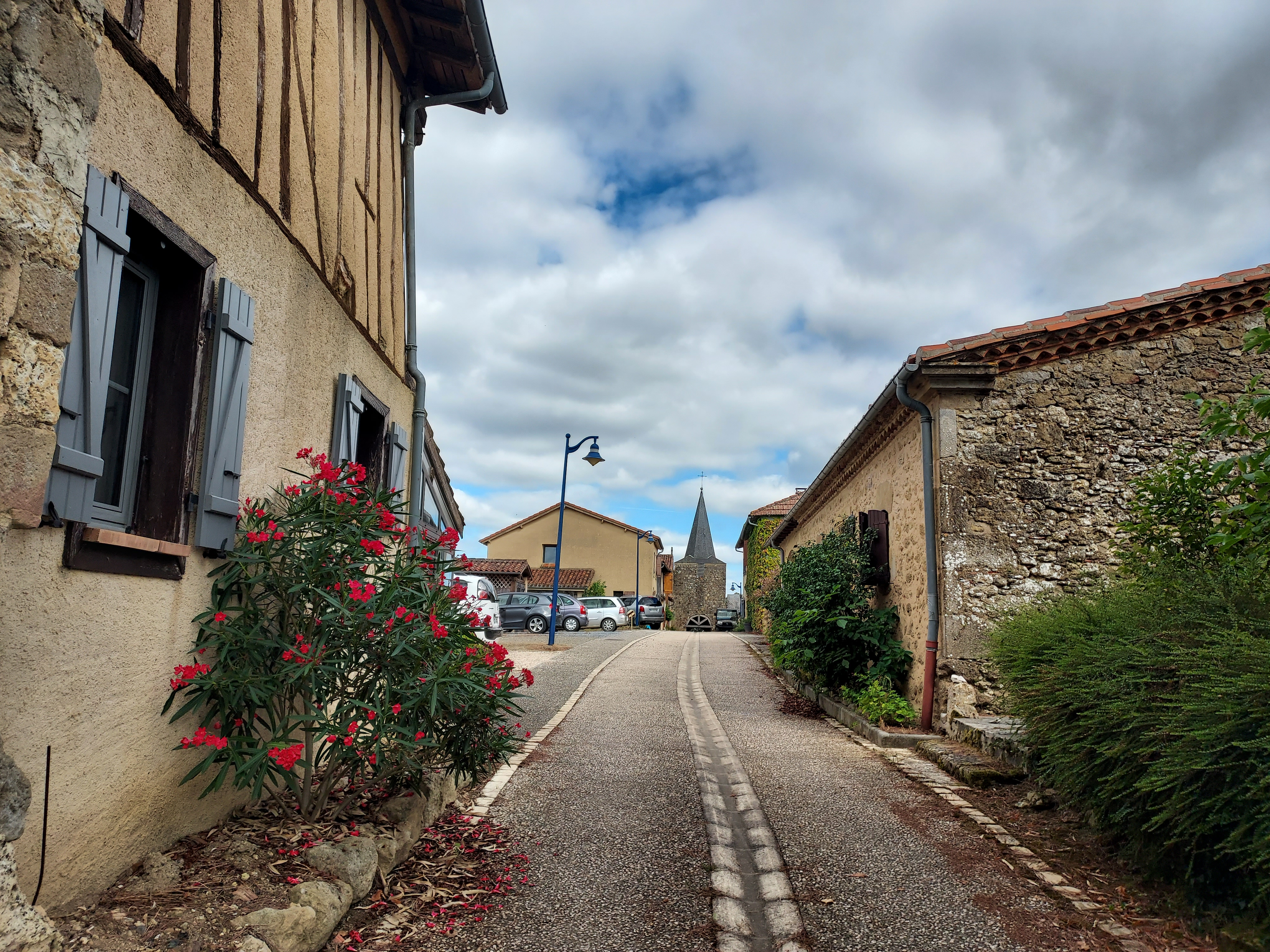
- Castelnau-d'Anglès
- Location of Castelnau-d’Anglès
- Location within France Location within Occitanie
- Coordinates: 43°36′36″N 0°17′47″E
- Country: France
- Region: Occitania
- Department: Gers
- Arrondissement: Mirande
- Canton: Pardiac-Rivière-Basse
- Intercommunality: Cœur d'Astarac en Gascogne

Government
  - Mayor (2020–2026): Gérard Labordère
- Area^{1}: 11.94 km^{2} (4.61 sq mi)
- Elevation: 234 m (768 ft)
- Highest elevation: 242 m (794 ft)
- Lowest elevation: 142 m (466 ft)
- Population (2023): 93
  - Density: 7.8/km^{2} (20/sq mi)
- Time zone: UTC+01:00 (CET)
  - Summer (DST): UTC+02:00 (CEST)
- INSEE/Postal code: 32077 /32320
- ^{1} French Land Register data, which excludes lakes, ponds, glaciers > 1 km^{2} (0.386 sq mi or 247 acres) and river estuaries.

Castelnau-d'Anglès is a commune in the Gers department in southwestern France.

== Geography ==
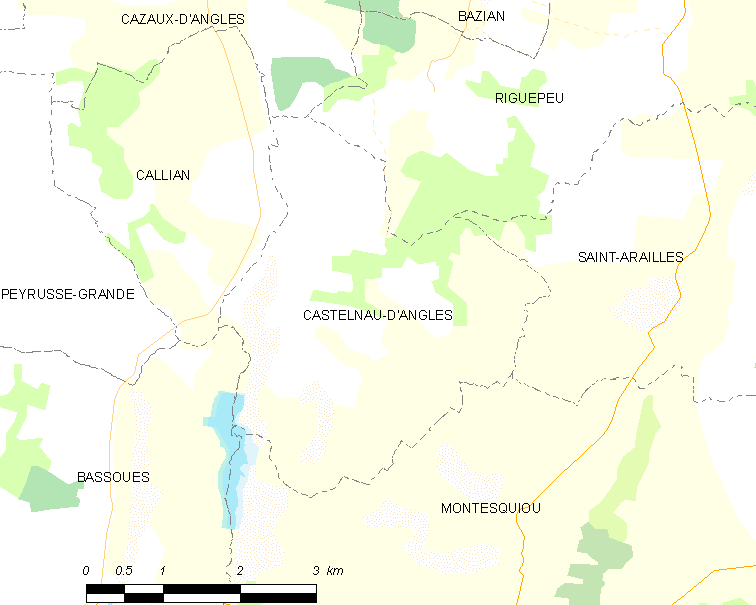
Castelnau-d'Anglès and its surrounding communes

== Population ==
Historical population
Year	Pop.	±% p.a.
1968	102	—
1975	96	−0.86%
1982	87	−1.40%
1990	87	+0.00%
1999	90	+0.38%
2007	92	+0.28%
2012	92	+0.00%
2017	89	−0.66%
2023	93	+0.74%
Source: INSEE

== See also ==
- Communes of the Gers department
