= Mont-d'Astarac =

- Commune
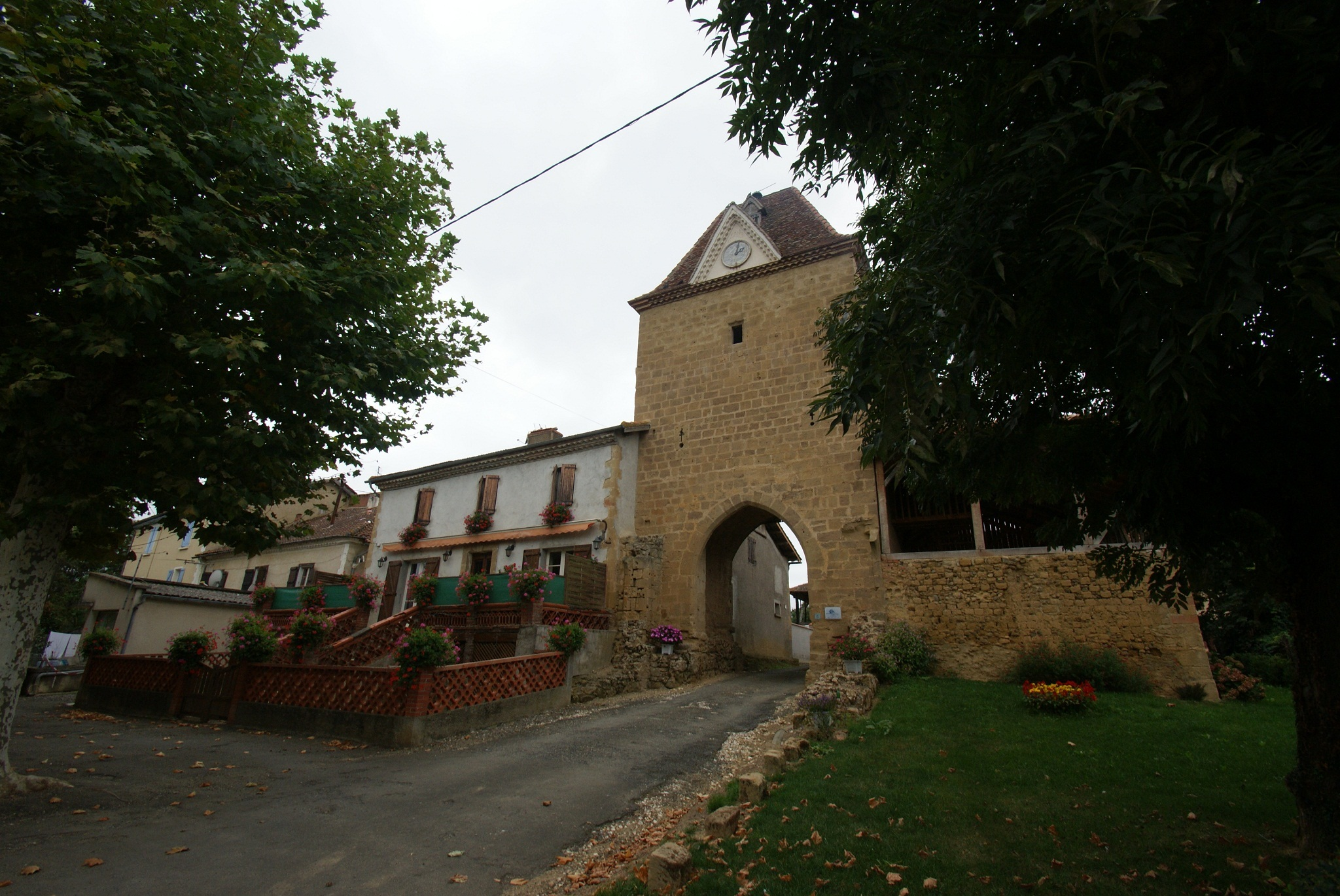
- Restored gate and tower

- Coat of arms
- Location of Mont-d'Astarac
- Location within France Location within Occitanie
- Coordinates: 43°19′45″N 0°34′08″E
- Country: France
- Region: Occitania
- Department: Gers
- Arrondissement: Mirande
- Canton: Astarac-Gimone

Government
  - Mayor (2020–2026): Françoise Casale
- Area^{1}: 8.05 km^{2} (3.11 sq mi)
- Elevation: 349 m (1,145 ft)
- Highest elevation: 386 m (1,266 ft)
- Lowest elevation: 234 m (768 ft)
- Population (2023): 90
  - Density: 11/km^{2} (29/sq mi)
- Time zone: UTC+01:00 (CET)
  - Summer (DST): UTC+02:00 (CEST)
- INSEE/Postal code: 32280 /32140
- ^{1} French Land Register data, which excludes lakes, ponds, glaciers > 1 km^{2} (0.386 sq mi or 247 acres) and river estuaries.

Mont-d'Astarac (French pronunciation: [mɔ̃ dastaʁak]; Gascon: Lo Mont d'Astarac) is a commune in the Gers department in southwestern France.

== Geography ==
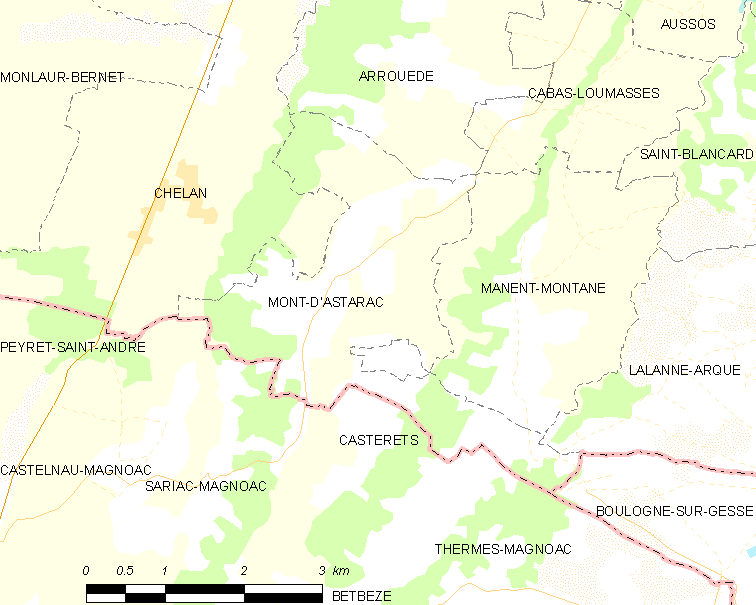
Mont-d'Astarac and its surrounding communes

== History ==
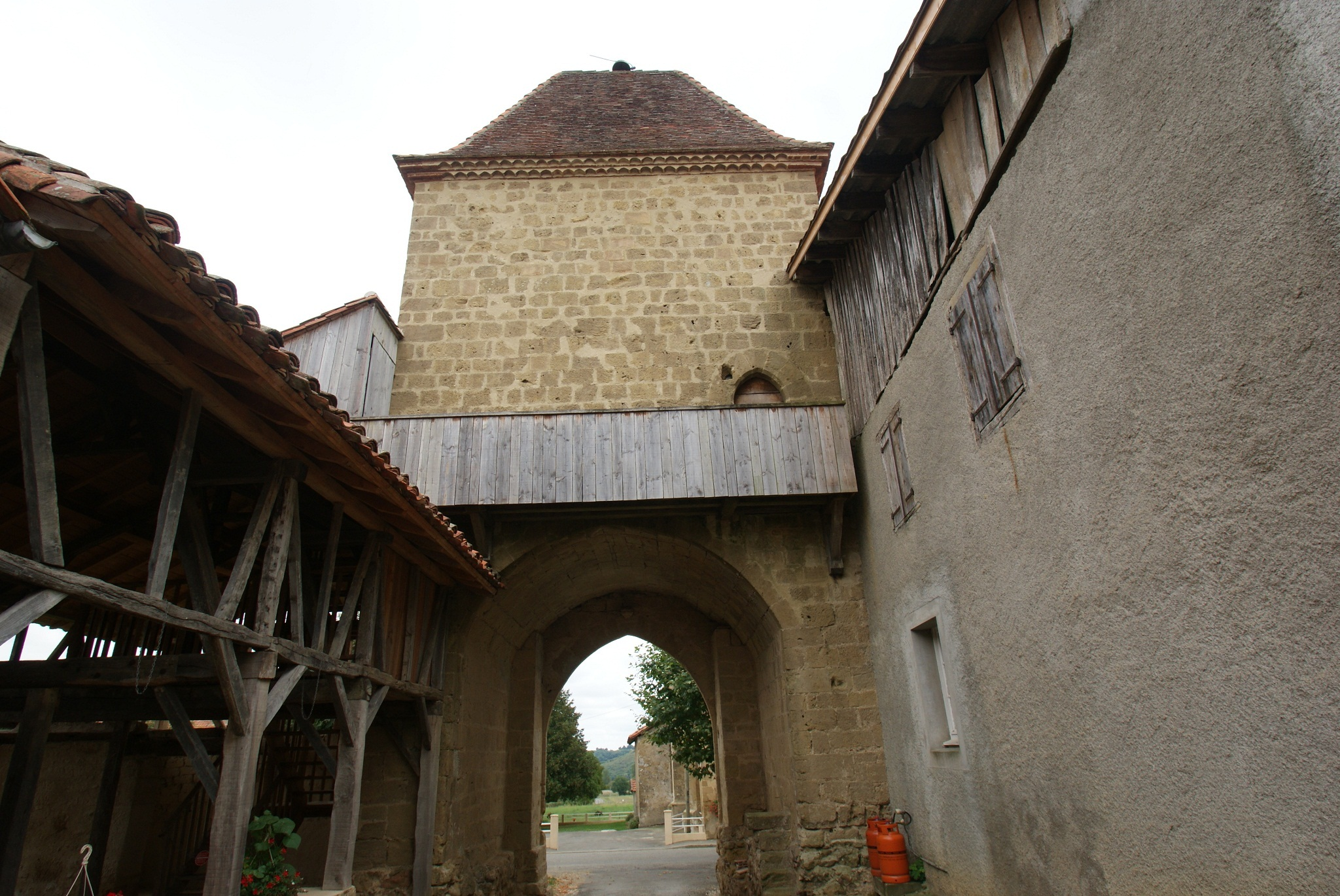
The inside of the gate.

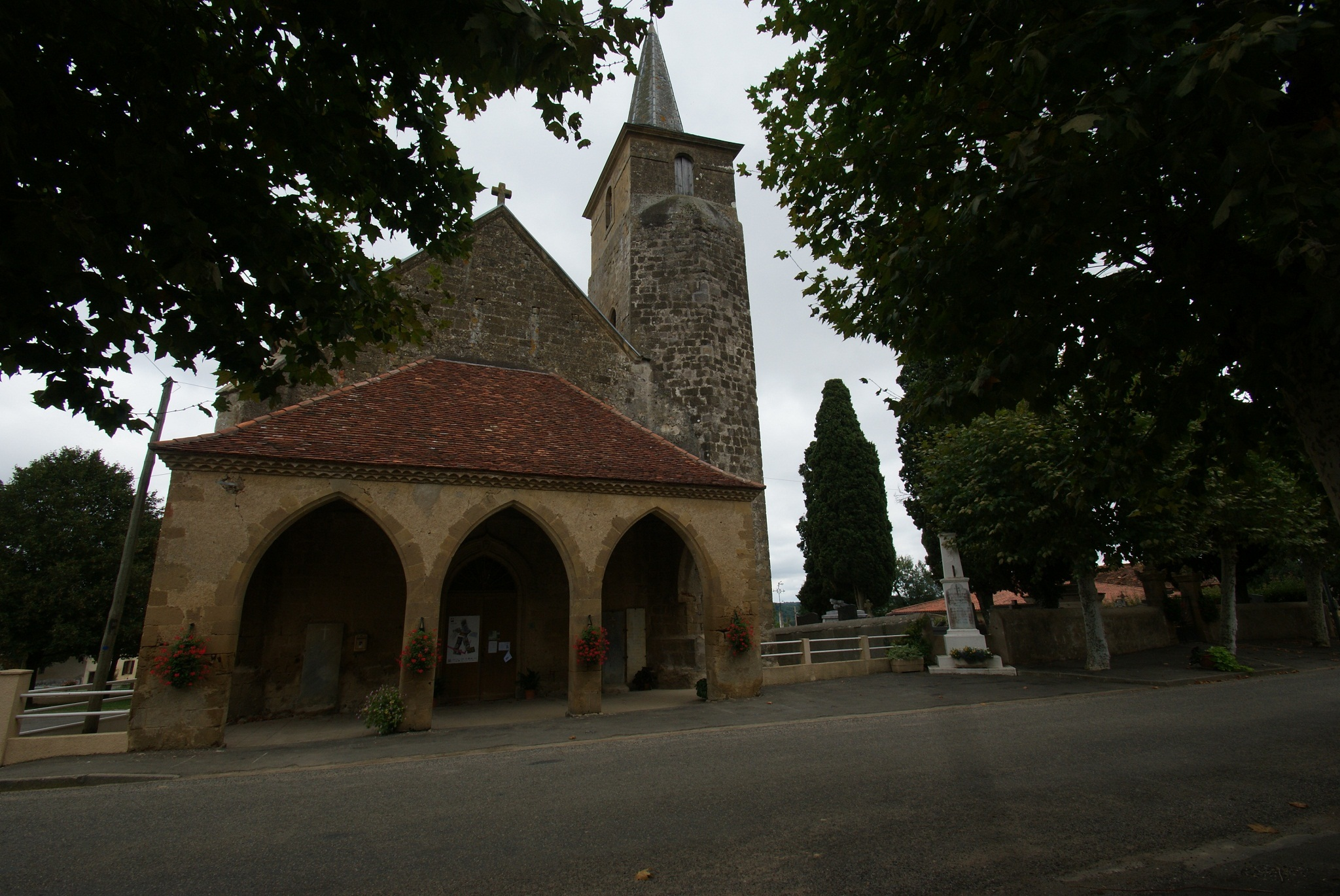
The church.

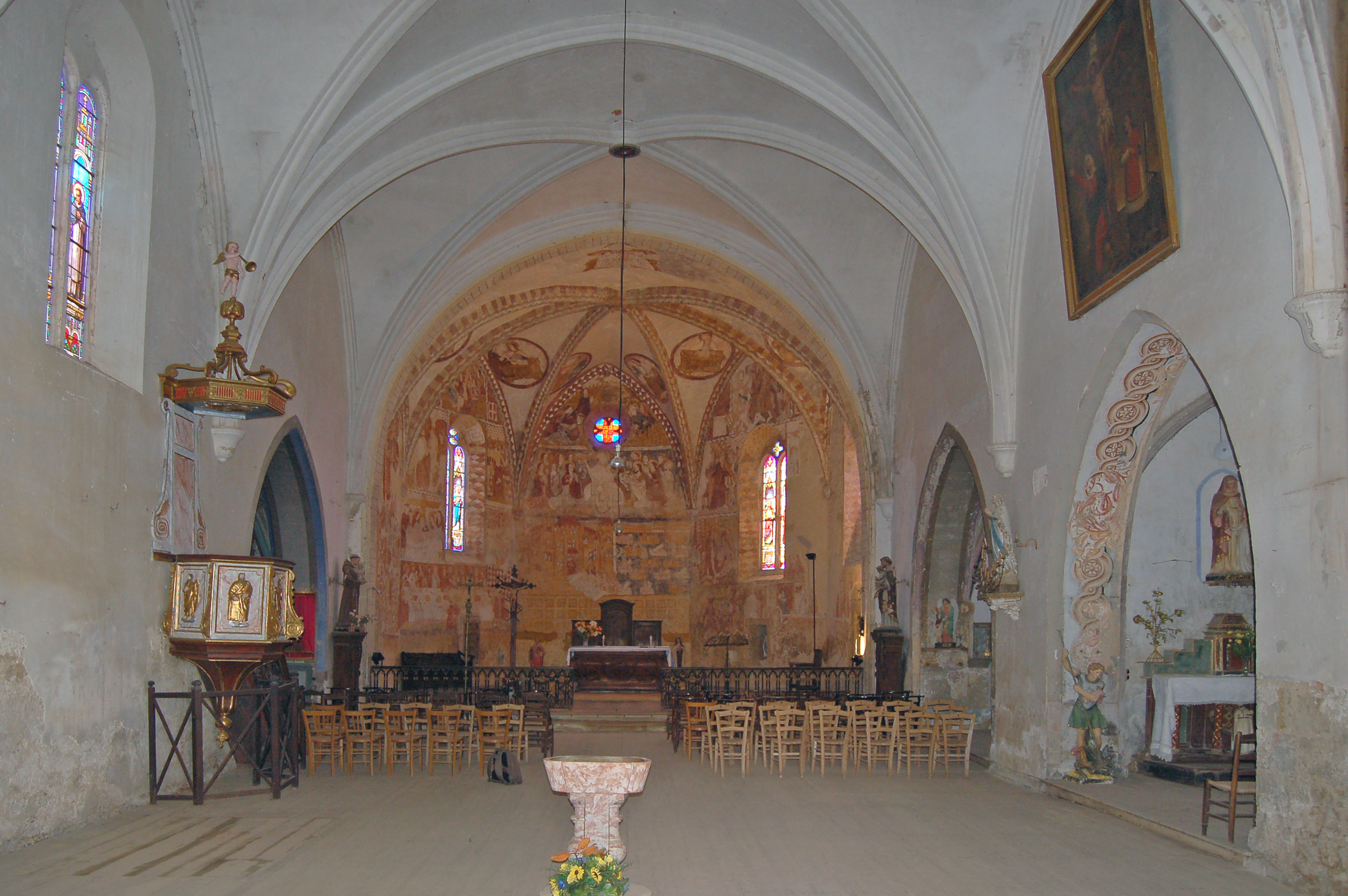
Interior of the church including murals.

Its history goes back to the 930s, when it became the first capital of Astarac. It was on the feudal motte, still visible today, that Arnaud Garcia established his castle, having inherited the County of Astarac from his father Count de Gascogne, Garcia Sanchez (called the Crooked), grandson of the count of Castille. It is worth seeing for its monuments - tower and church - registered among the Historic Monuments of France, and for its beautiful murals dating to the 15th century.

== Population ==
Historical population
Year	Pop.	±% p.a.
1968	122	—
1975	107	−1.86%
1982	112	+0.65%
1990	103	−1.04%
1999	102	−0.11%
2007	96	−0.75%
2012	101	+1.02%
2017	104	+0.59%
2023	90	−2.38%
Source: INSEE

== See also ==
- Communes of the Gers department
