= Saint-Maur, Gers =

Saint-Maur
- Commune
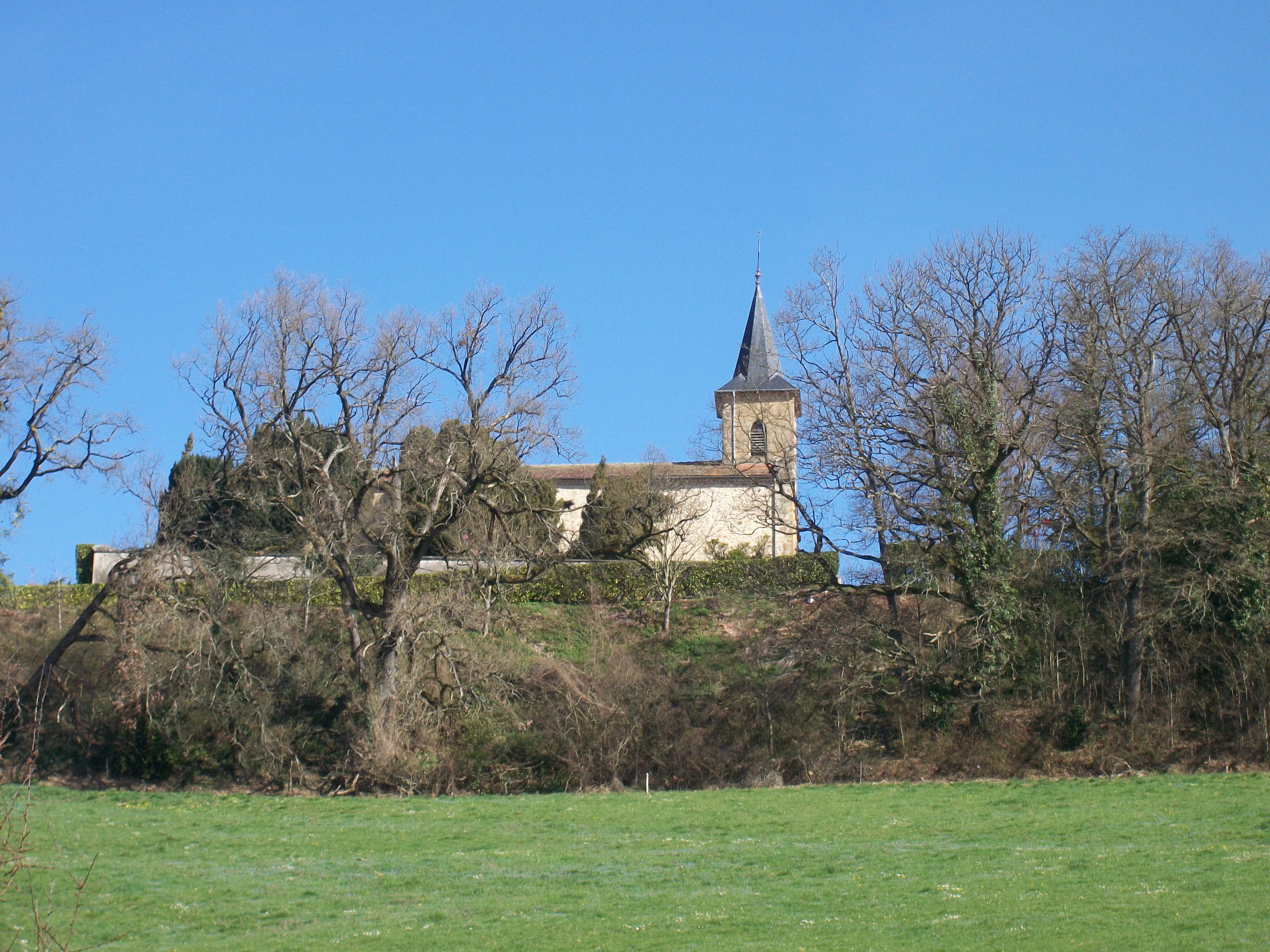
- The church in Saint-Maur
- Location of Saint-Maur
- Location within France Location within Occitanie
- Coordinates: 43°28′43″N 0°20′38″E
- Country: France
- Region: Occitania
- Department: Gers
- Arrondissement: Mirande
- Canton: Mirande-Astarac
- Intercommunality: Cœur d'Astarac en Gascogne

Government
  - Mayor (2020–2026): Stéphane Bernard
- Area^{1}: 13.84 km^{2} (5.34 sq mi)
- Elevation: 289 m (948 ft)
- Highest elevation: 290 m (950 ft)
- Lowest elevation: 170 m (560 ft)
- Population (2023): 135
  - Density: 9.75/km^{2} (25.3/sq mi)
- Time zone: UTC+01:00 (CET)
  - Summer (DST): UTC+02:00 (CEST)
- INSEE/Postal code: 32393 /32300
- ^{1} French Land Register data, which excludes lakes, ponds, glaciers > 1 km^{2} (0.386 sq mi or 247 acres) and river estuaries.

Saint-Maur (French pronunciation: [sɛ̃ mɔʁ]; Occitan: Sent Maur) is a commune in the Gers department in southwestern France.

== Geography ==
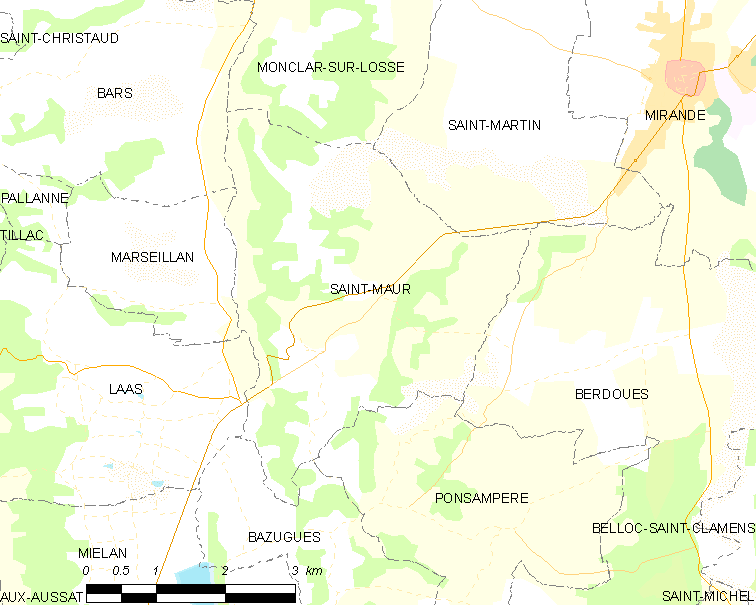
Saint-Maur and its surrounding communes

== Population ==
Historical population
| Year | Pop. | ±% p.a. |
|---|---|---|
| 1968 | 132 | — |
| 1975 | 89 | −5.48% |
| 1982 | 111 | +3.21% |
| 1990 | 103 | −0.93% |
| 1999 | 111 | +0.83% |
| 2007 | 122 | +1.19% |
| 2012 | 133 | +1.74% |
| 2017 | 142 | +1.32% |
| 2023 | 135 | −0.84% |
Source: INSEE

== See also ==
- Communes of the Gers department
