= Faget-Abbatial =

- Commune
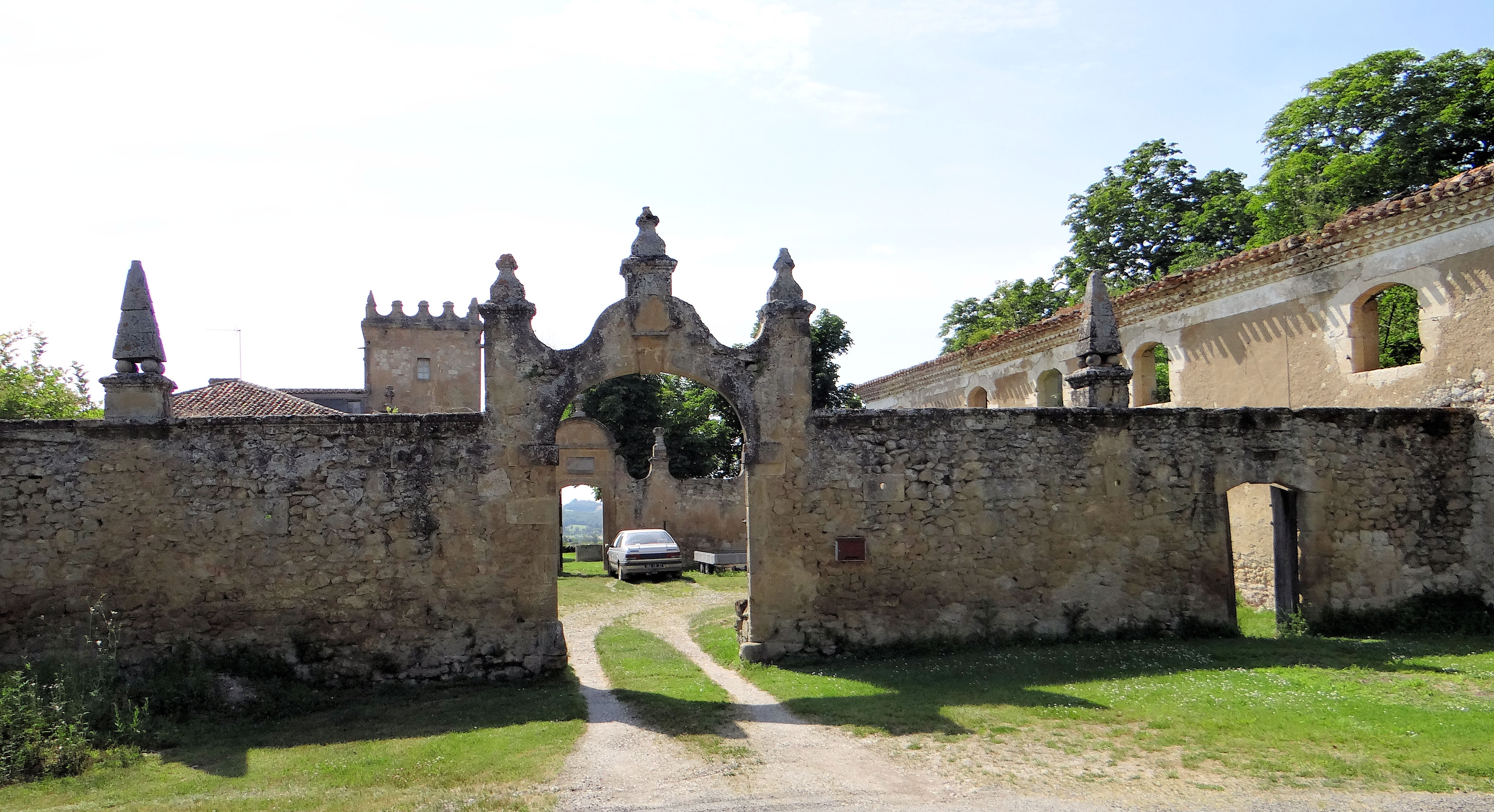
- Entrance to the abbatial palace

- Coat of arms
- Location of Faget-Abbatial
- Location within France Location within Occitanie
- Coordinates: 43°30′25″N 0°41′41″E
- Country: France
- Region: Occitania
- Department: Gers
- Arrondissement: Mirande
- Canton: Astarac-Gimone
- Intercommunality: Val de Gers

Government
  - Mayor (2020–2026): Daniel Dumont
- Area^{1}: 17.46 km^{2} (6.74 sq mi)
- Elevation: 215 m (705 ft)
- Highest elevation: 303 m (994 ft)
- Lowest elevation: 182 m (597 ft)
- Population (2023): 212
  - Density: 12.1/km^{2} (31.4/sq mi)
- Time zone: UTC+01:00 (CET)
  - Summer (DST): UTC+02:00 (CEST)
- INSEE/Postal code: 32130 /32450
- ^{1} French Land Register data, which excludes lakes, ponds, glaciers > 1 km^{2} (0.386 sq mi or 247 acres) and river estuaries.

Faget-Abbatial (French pronunciation: [faʒɛ abatjal]; Occitan: Faget Abadiau) is a commune in the Gers department in southwestern France.

== Geography ==
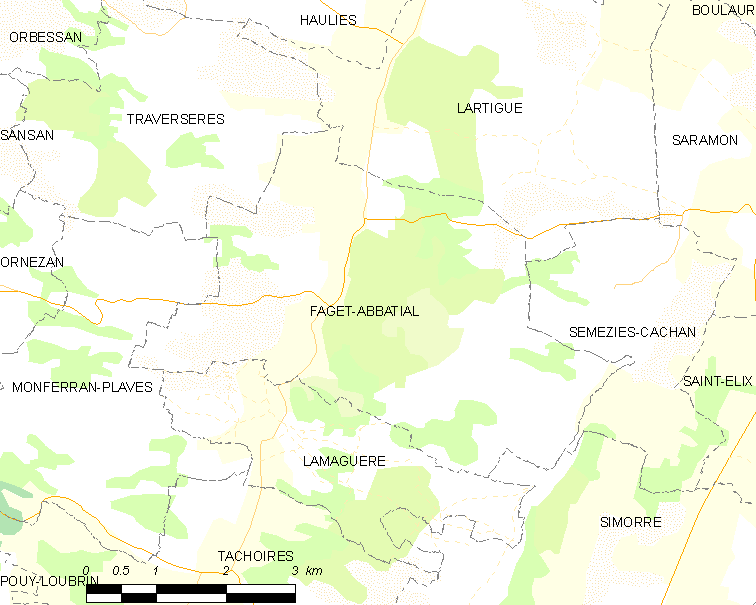
Faget-Abbatial and its surrounding communes

== Population ==
Historical population
Year	Pop.	±% p.a.
1968	226	—
1975	201	−1.66%
1982	217	+1.10%
1990	201	−0.95%
1999	211	+0.54%
2007	228	+0.97%
2012	227	−0.09%
2017	218	−0.81%
2023	212	−0.46%
Source: INSEE

== See also ==
- Communes of the Gers department
