= Préchacq =

Préchacq is the name of several communes in France:

- Préchacq-les-Bains, Landes
- Préchacq-Josbaig, Pyrénées-Atlantiques
- Préchacq-Navarrenx, Pyrénées-Atlantiques

== See also ==
- Préchac (disambiguation)
