= Pouylebon =

- Commune
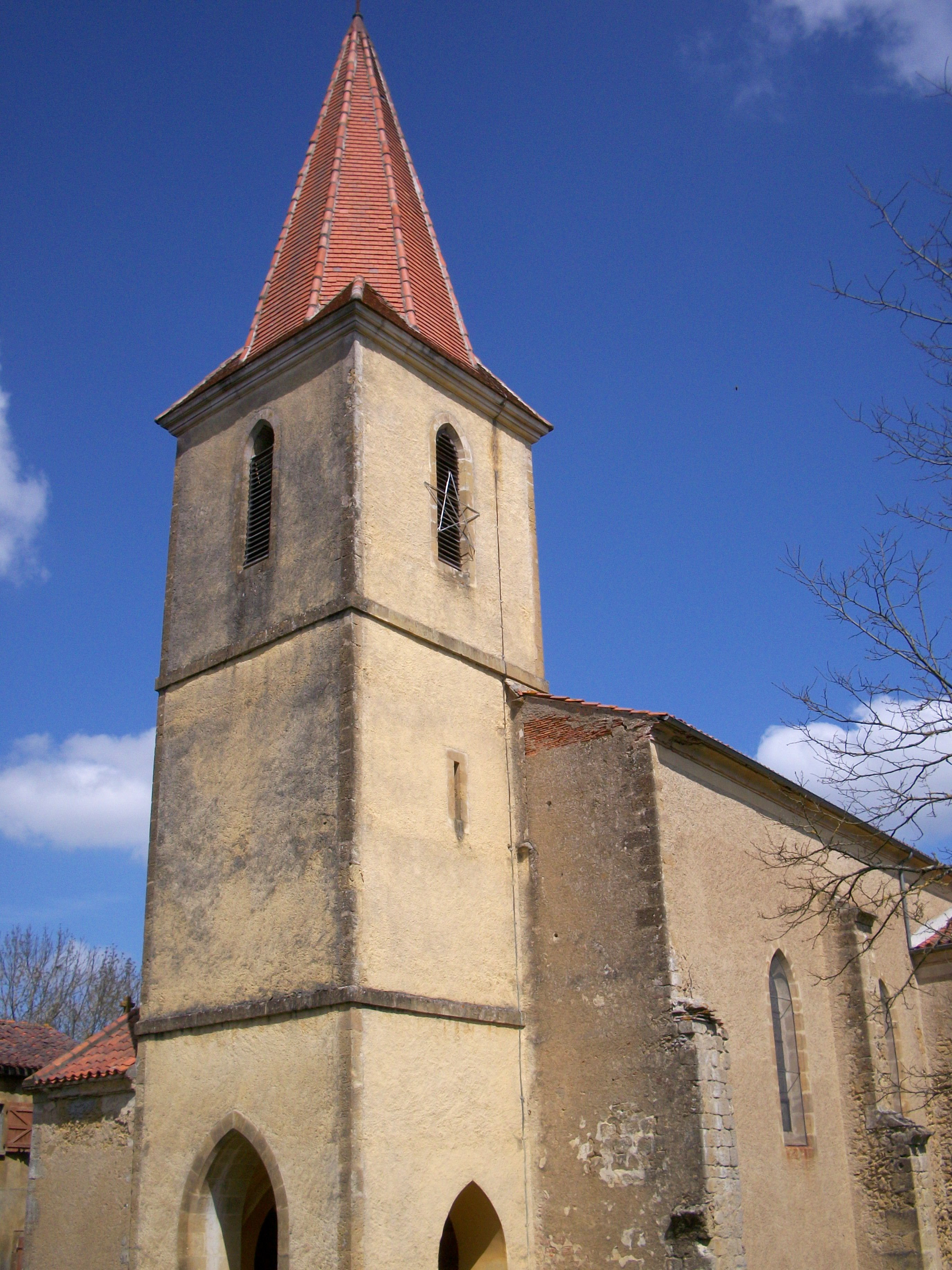
- The church in Pouylebon
- Location of Pouylebon
- Location within France Location within Occitanie
- Coordinates: 43°32′52″N 0°17′41″E
- Country: France
- Region: Occitania
- Department: Gers
- Arrondissement: Mirande
- Canton: Pardiac-Rivière-Basse
- Intercommunality: Cœur d'Astarac en Gascogne

Government
  - Mayor (2020–2026): Gaëtan Leclerc
- Area^{1}: 14.38 km^{2} (5.55 sq mi)
- Elevation: 268 m (879 ft)
- Highest elevation: 266 m (873 ft)
- Lowest elevation: 164 m (538 ft)
- Population (2023): 143
  - Density: 9.94/km^{2} (25.8/sq mi)
- Time zone: UTC+01:00 (CET)
  - Summer (DST): UTC+02:00 (CEST)
- INSEE/Postal code: 32326 /32320
- ^{1} French Land Register data, which excludes lakes, ponds, glaciers > 1 km^{2} (0.386 sq mi or 247 acres) and river estuaries.

Pouylebon (French pronunciation: [pwilbɔ̃]; Gascon: Poilobon) is a commune in the Gers department in southwestern France.

== Geography ==
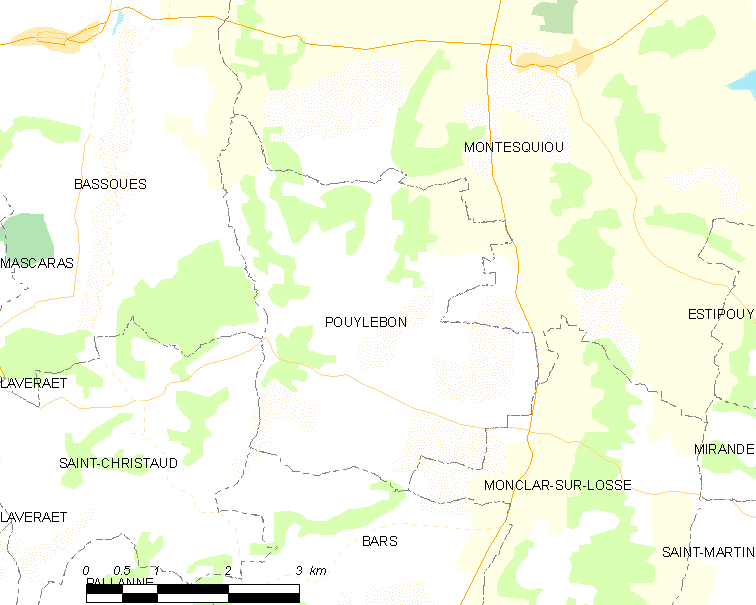
Pouylebon and its surrounding communes

== Population ==
Historical population
Year	Pop.	±% p.a.
1968	159	—
1975	149	−0.92%
1982	176	+2.41%
1990	178	+0.14%
1999	155	−1.53%
2007	148	−0.58%
2012	156	+1.06%
2017	139	−2.28%
2023	143	+0.47%
Source: INSEE

== See also ==
- Communes of the Gers department
