= Bellegarde, Gers =

Bellegarde
- Commune
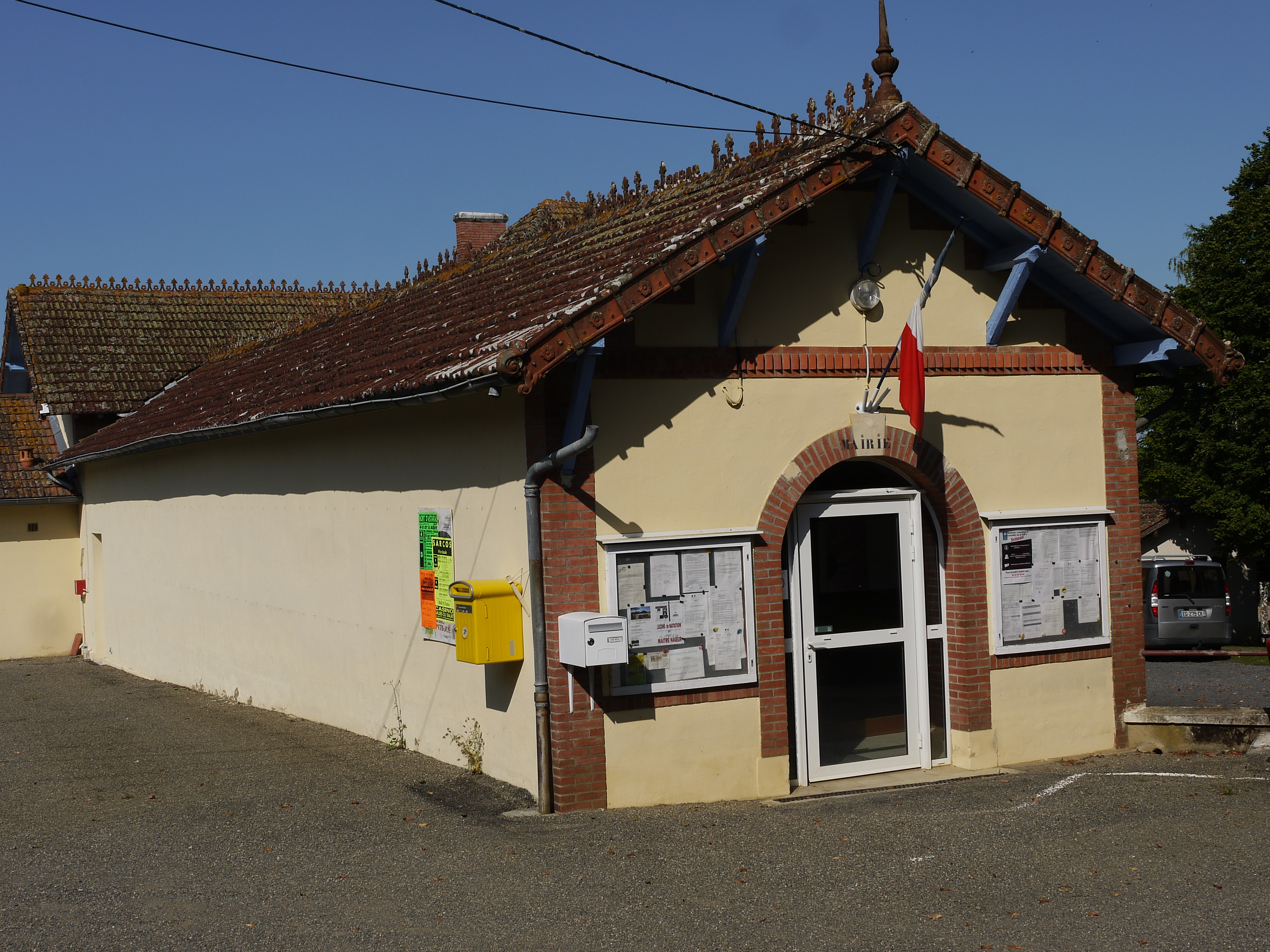
- The town hall in Bellegarde
- Location of Bellegarde
- Location within France Location within Occitanie
- Coordinates: 43°25′32″N 0°37′28″E
- Country: France
- Region: Occitania
- Department: Gers
- Arrondissement: Mirande
- Canton: Astarac-Gimone
- Intercommunality: Val de Gers

Government
  - Mayor (2020–2026): Jean-Philippe Gerault
- Area^{1}: 14.39 km^{2} (5.56 sq mi)
- Elevation: 300 m (980 ft)
- Highest elevation: 315 m (1,033 ft)
- Lowest elevation: 212 m (696 ft)
- Population (2023): 157
  - Density: 10.9/km^{2} (28.3/sq mi)
- Time zone: UTC+01:00 (CET)
  - Summer (DST): UTC+02:00 (CEST)
- INSEE/Postal code: 32041 /32140
- ^{1} French Land Register data, which excludes lakes, ponds, glaciers > 1 km^{2} (0.386 sq mi or 247 acres) and river estuaries.

Bellegarde (French pronunciation: [bɛlɡaʁd]; Occitan: Belagarda e Adolins) is a commune in the Gers department in southwestern France.

== Geography ==
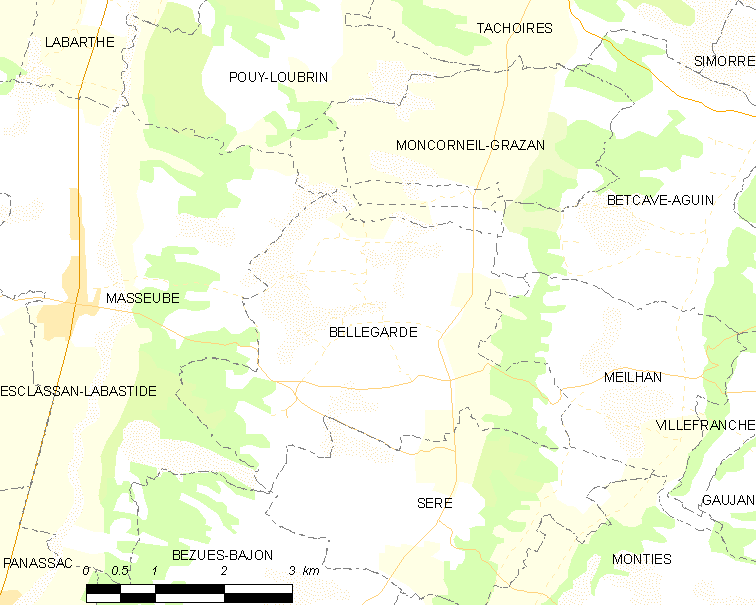
Bellegarde and its surrounding communes

== Population ==
Historical population
Year	Pop.	±% p.a.
1968	203	—
1975	165	−2.92%
1982	148	−1.54%
1990	150	+0.17%
1999	136	−1.08%
2007	159	+1.97%
2012	173	+1.70%
2017	190	+1.89%
2023	157	−3.13%
Source: INSEE

== See also ==
- Communes of the Gers department
