= Chélan =

- Commune
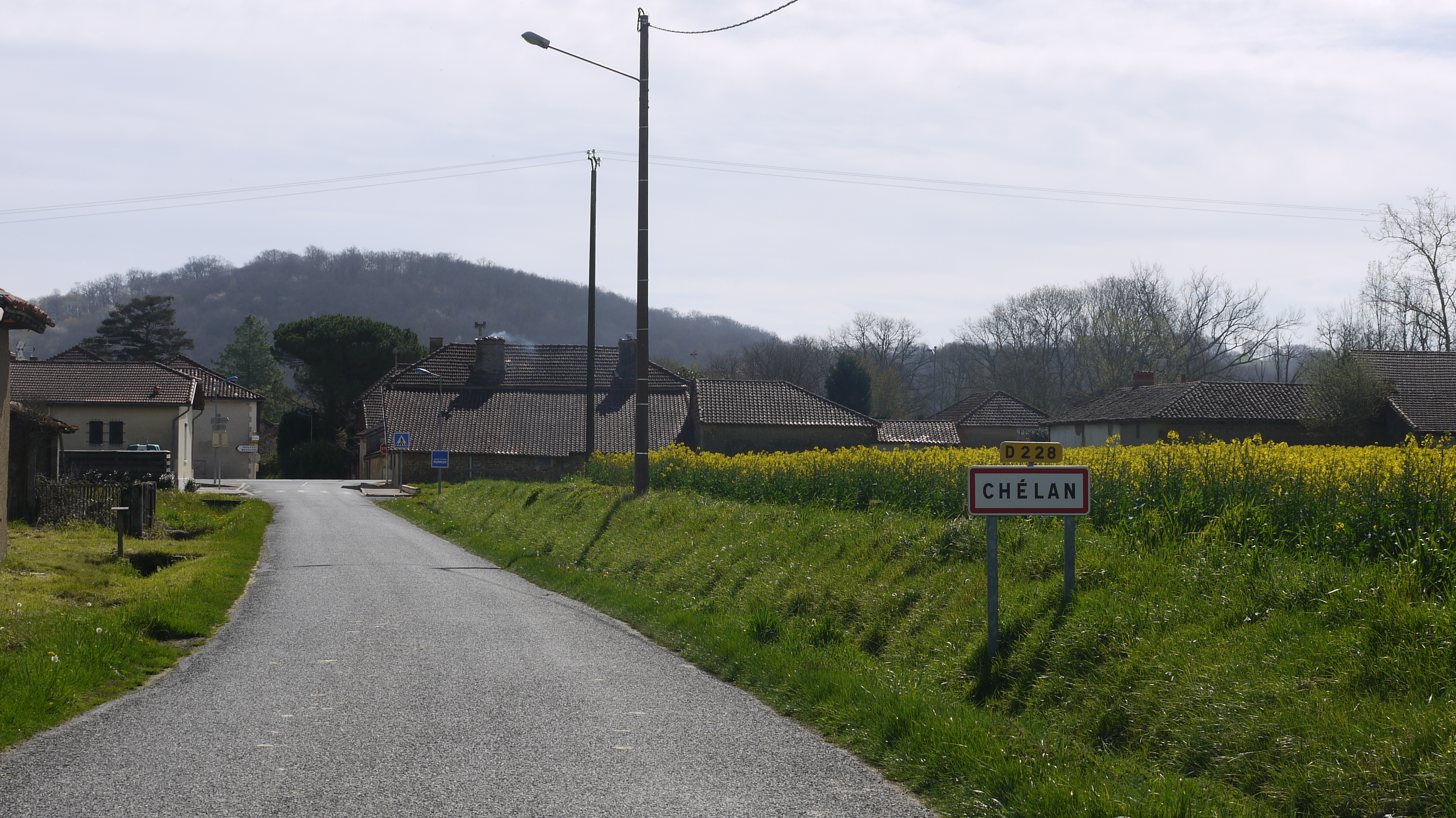
- The road into Chélan
- Location of Chélan
- Location within France Location within Occitanie
- Coordinates: 43°20′46″N 0°32′57″E
- Country: France
- Region: Occitania
- Department: Gers
- Arrondissement: Mirande
- Canton: Astarac-Gimone
- Intercommunality: Val de Gers

Government
  - Mayor (2020–2026): Carmen Saint-Martin
- Area^{1}: 13.49 km^{2} (5.21 sq mi)
- Elevation: 236 m (774 ft)
- Highest elevation: 341 m (1,119 ft)
- Lowest elevation: 222 m (728 ft)
- Population (2023): 172
  - Density: 12.8/km^{2} (33.0/sq mi)
- Time zone: UTC+01:00 (CET)
  - Summer (DST): UTC+02:00 (CEST)
- INSEE/Postal code: 32103 /32140
- ^{1} French Land Register data, which excludes lakes, ponds, glaciers > 1 km^{2} (0.386 sq mi or 247 acres) and river estuaries.

Chélan (French pronunciation: [ʃelɑ̃]; Occitan: Shelan) is a commune in the Gers department in southwestern France.

== Geography ==
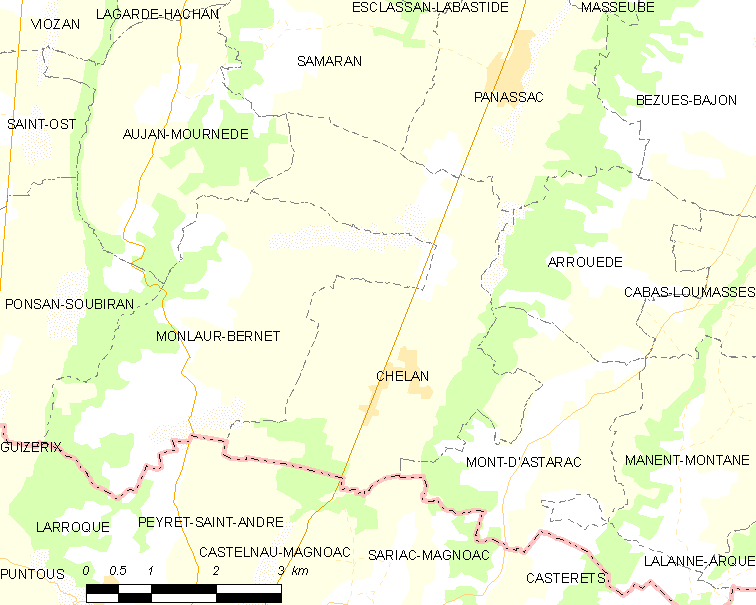
Chélan and its surrounding communes

== Population ==
Historical population
Year	Pop.	±% p.a.
1968	238	—
1975	218	−1.25%
1982	219	+0.07%
1990	192	−1.63%
1999	185	−0.41%
2007	191	+0.40%
2012	188	−0.32%
2017	175	−1.42%
2023	172	−0.29%
Source: INSEE

== See also ==
- Communes of the Gers department
