= Tasque =

- Commune
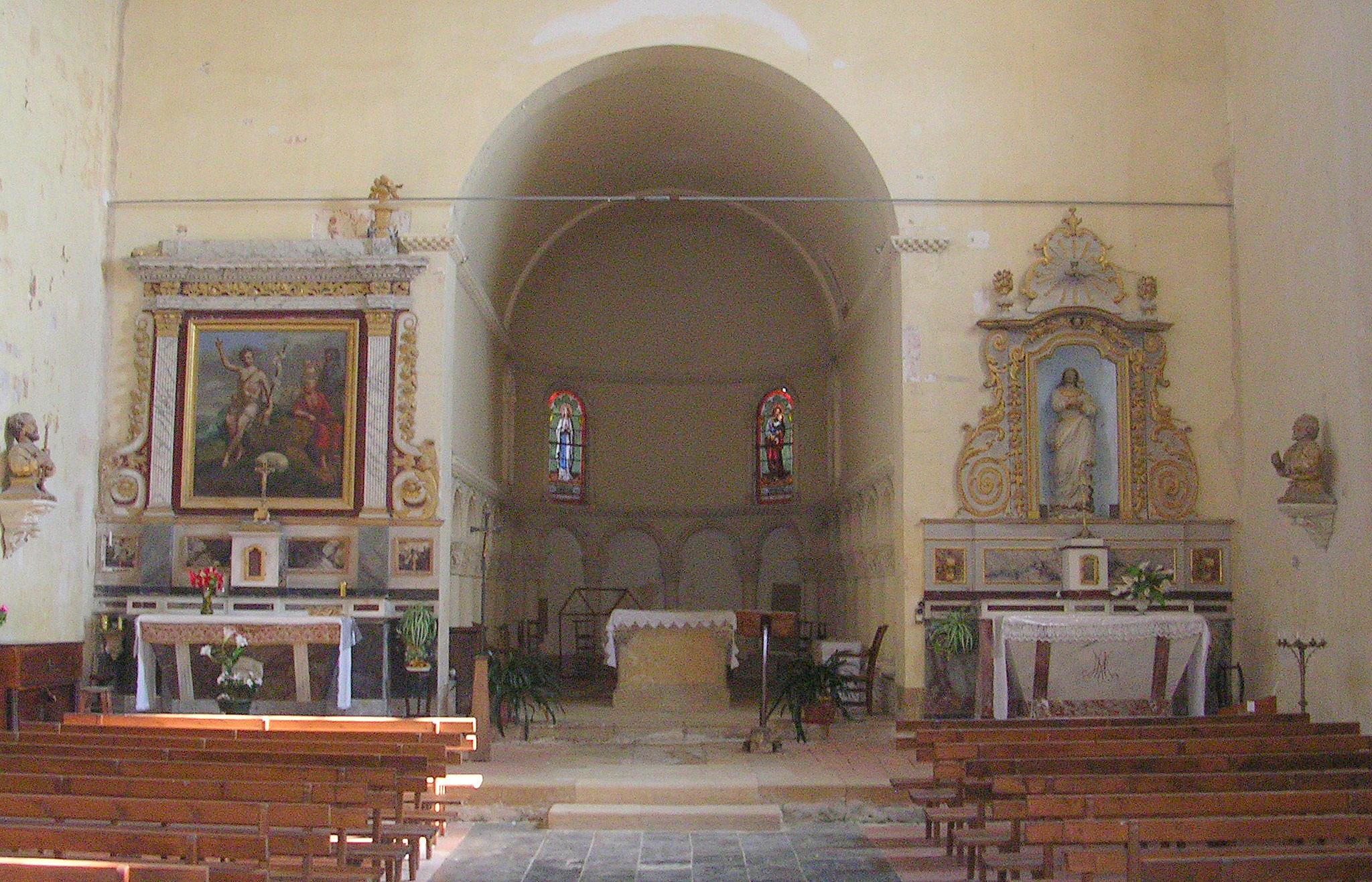
- Interior of the church

- Coat of arms
- Location of Tasque
- Location within France Location within Occitanie
- Coordinates: 43°38′25″N 0°01′12″E
- Country: France
- Region: Occitania
- Department: Gers
- Arrondissement: Mirande
- Canton: Pardiac-Rivière-Basse
- Intercommunality: Bastides et vallons du Gers

Government
  - Mayor (2020–2026): Frank Arnoux
- Area^{1}: 10.02 km^{2} (3.87 sq mi)
- Elevation: 117 m (384 ft)
- Highest elevation: 190 m (620 ft)
- Lowest elevation: 115 m (377 ft)
- Population (2023): 243
  - Density: 24.3/km^{2} (62.8/sq mi)
- Time zone: UTC+01:00 (CET)
  - Summer (DST): UTC+02:00 (CEST)
- INSEE/Postal code: 32440 /32160
- ^{1} French Land Register data, which excludes lakes, ponds, glaciers > 1 km^{2} (0.386 sq mi or 247 acres) and river estuaries.

Tasque (French pronunciation: [task]) is a commune in the Gers department of southwestern France. It contains a stone Catholic church.

== Geography ==
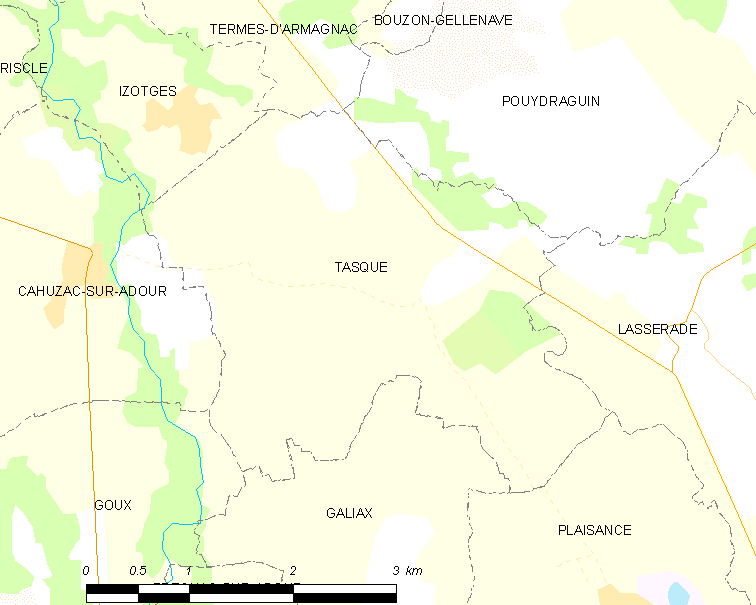
Tasque and its surrounding communes

== Population ==
Historical population
Year	Pop.	±% p.a.
1968	259	—
1975	258	−0.06%
1982	216	−2.51%
1990	217	+0.06%
1999	216	−0.05%
2007	220	+0.23%
2012	277	+4.72%
2017	255	−1.64%
2023	243	−0.80%
Source: INSEE

== See also ==
- Communes of the Gers department
