= Tieste-Uragnoux =

- Commune
- Location of Tieste-Uragnoux
- Location within France Location within Occitanie
- Coordinates: 43°33′01″N 0°02′19″E
- Country: France
- Region: Occitania
- Department: Gers
- Arrondissement: Mirande
- Canton: Pardiac-Rivière-Basse
- Intercommunality: Bastides et vallons du Gers

Government
  - Mayor (2020–2026): Carole Arroyo
- Area^{1}: 6.1 km^{2} (2.4 sq mi)
- Elevation: 160 m (520 ft)
- Highest elevation: 224 m (735 ft)
- Lowest elevation: 144 m (472 ft)
- Population (2023): 158
  - Density: 26/km^{2} (67/sq mi)
- Time zone: UTC+01:00 (CET)
  - Summer (DST): UTC+02:00 (CEST)
- INSEE/Postal code: 32445 /32160
- ^{1} French Land Register data, which excludes lakes, ponds, glaciers > 1 km^{2} (0.386 sq mi or 247 acres) and river estuaries.

Tieste-Uragnoux (French pronunciation: [tjɛst yʁaɲu]; Occitan: Tièste e Los Uranhós) is a commune in the Gers department in southwestern France.

== Geography ==
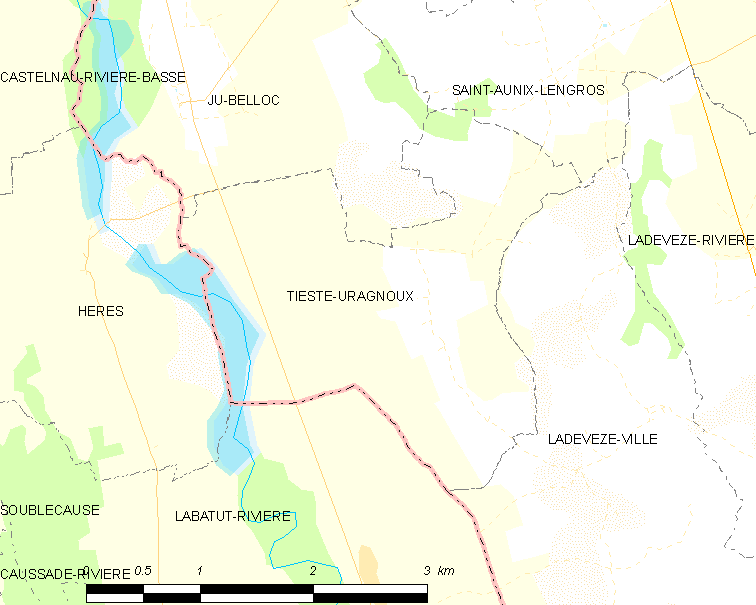
Tieste-Uragnoux and its surrounding communes

== Population ==
Historical population
Year	Pop.	±% p.a.
1968	129	—
1975	128	−0.11%
1982	144	+1.70%
1990	118	−2.46%
1999	121	+0.28%
2007	133	+1.19%
2012	147	+2.02%
2017	167	+2.58%
2023	158	−0.92%
Source: INSEE

== See also ==
- Communes of the Gers department
