= Ladevèze-Rivière =

- Commune
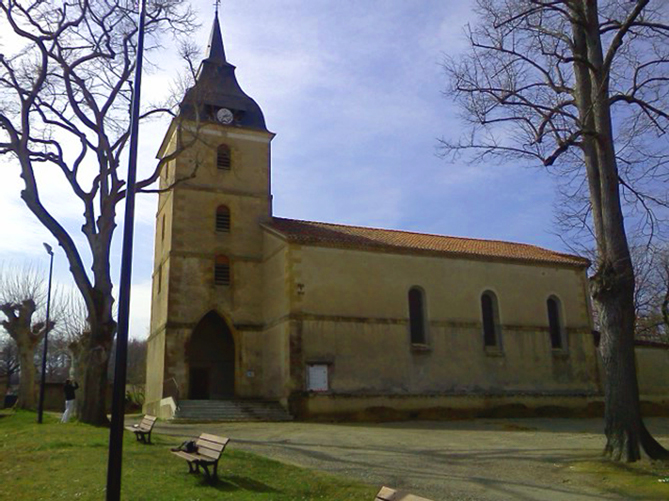
- The church in Ladevèze-Rivière

- Coat of arms
- Location of Ladevèze-Rivière
- Location within France Location within Occitanie
- Coordinates: 43°33′10″N 0°04′28″E
- Country: France
- Region: Occitania
- Department: Gers
- Arrondissement: Mirande
- Canton: Pardiac-Rivière-Basse
- Intercommunality: Bastides et vallons du Gers

Government
  - Mayor (2020–2026): Cyril Cotonat
- Area^{1}: 13.54 km^{2} (5.23 sq mi)
- Elevation: 150 m (490 ft)
- Highest elevation: 220 m (720 ft)
- Lowest elevation: 134 m (440 ft)
- Population (2023): 223
  - Density: 16.5/km^{2} (42.7/sq mi)
- Time zone: UTC+01:00 (CET)
  - Summer (DST): UTC+02:00 (CEST)
- INSEE/Postal code: 32174 /32230
- ^{1} French Land Register data, which excludes lakes, ponds, glaciers > 1 km^{2} (0.386 sq mi or 247 acres) and river estuaries.

Ladevèze-Rivière (French pronunciation: [ladvɛz ʁivjɛʁ]; Occitan: La Devesa Ribèra) is a commune in the Gers department in southwestern France.

== Geography ==
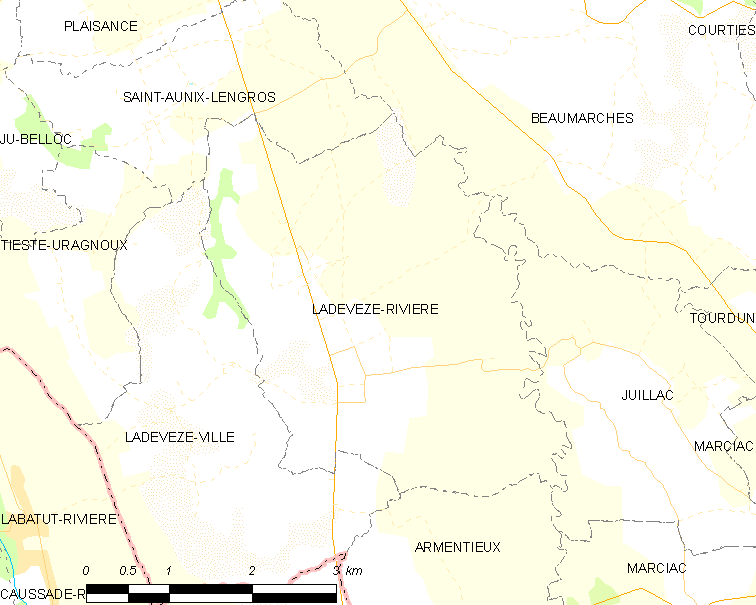
Ladevèze-Rivière and its surrounding communes

== Population ==
Historical population
Year	Pop.	±% p.a.
1968	313	—
1975	285	−1.33%
1982	261	−1.25%
1990	245	−0.79%
1999	223	−1.04%
2007	224	+0.06%
2012	228	+0.35%
2017	214	−1.26%
2023	223	+0.69%
Source: INSEE

== See also ==
- Communes of the Gers department
