= Lannux =

- Commune
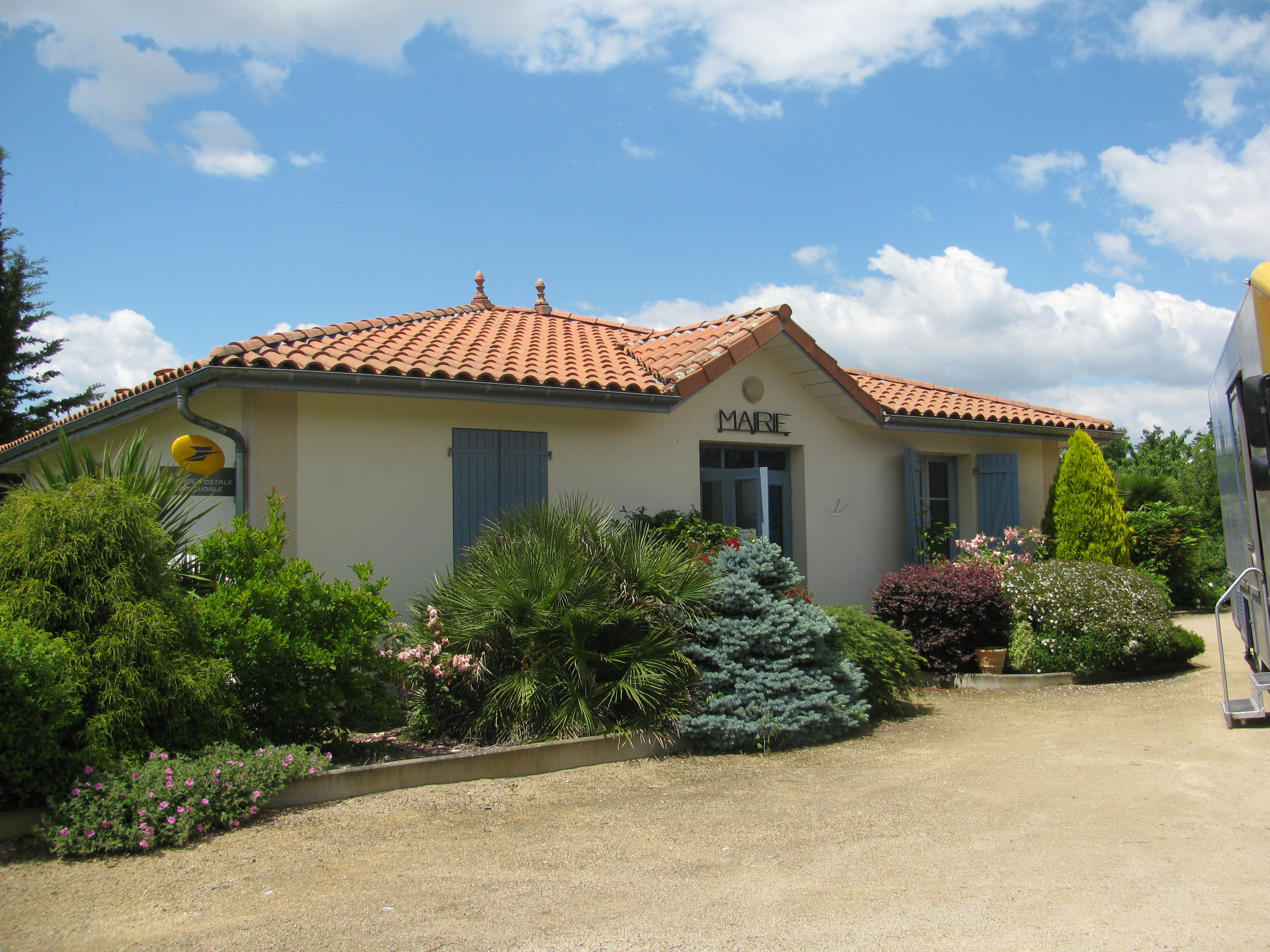
- The town hall in Lannux
- Location of Lannux
- Location within France Location within Occitanie
- Coordinates: 43°38′53″N 0°12′57″W
- Country: France
- Region: Occitania
- Department: Gers
- Arrondissement: Mirande
- Canton: Adour-Gersoise

Government
  - Mayor (2020–2026): Lambert Gijsbers
- Area^{1}: 12.83 km^{2} (4.95 sq mi)
- Elevation: 170 m (560 ft)
- Highest elevation: 223 m (732 ft)
- Lowest elevation: 82 m (269 ft)
- Population (2023): 216
  - Density: 16.8/km^{2} (43.6/sq mi)
- Time zone: UTC+01:00 (CET)
  - Summer (DST): UTC+02:00 (CEST)
- INSEE/Postal code: 32192 /32400
- ^{1} French Land Register data, which excludes lakes, ponds, glaciers > 1 km^{2} (0.386 sq mi or 247 acres) and river estuaries.

Lannux (French pronunciation: [lanyks]; Gascon: Lanutz) is a commune in the Gers department in southwestern France.

== Geography ==
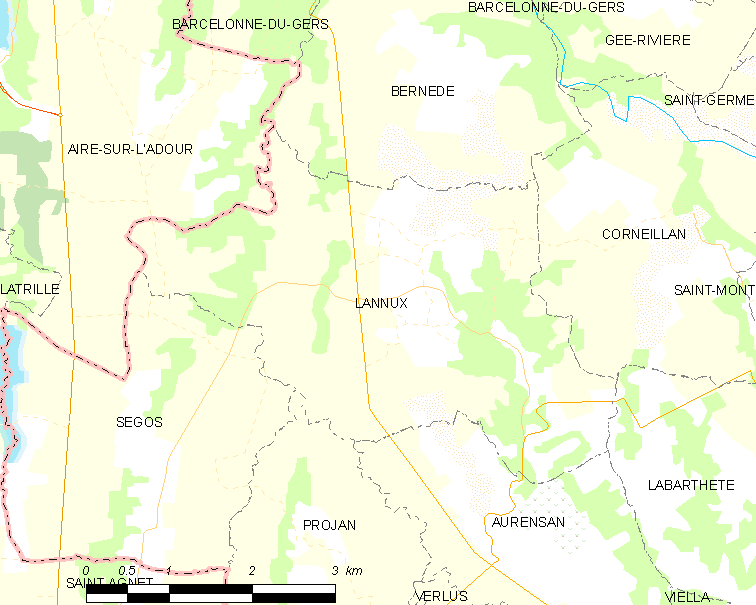
Lannux and its surrounding communes

== Population ==
Historical population
Year	Pop.	±% p.a.
1968	206	—
1975	194	−0.85%
1982	202	+0.58%
1990	200	−0.12%
1999	199	−0.06%
2007	212	+0.79%
2012	232	+1.82%
2017	245	+1.10%
2023	216	−2.08%
Source: INSEE

== See also ==
- Communes of the Gers department
