= Saint-Justin, Gers =

Saint-Justin
- Commune
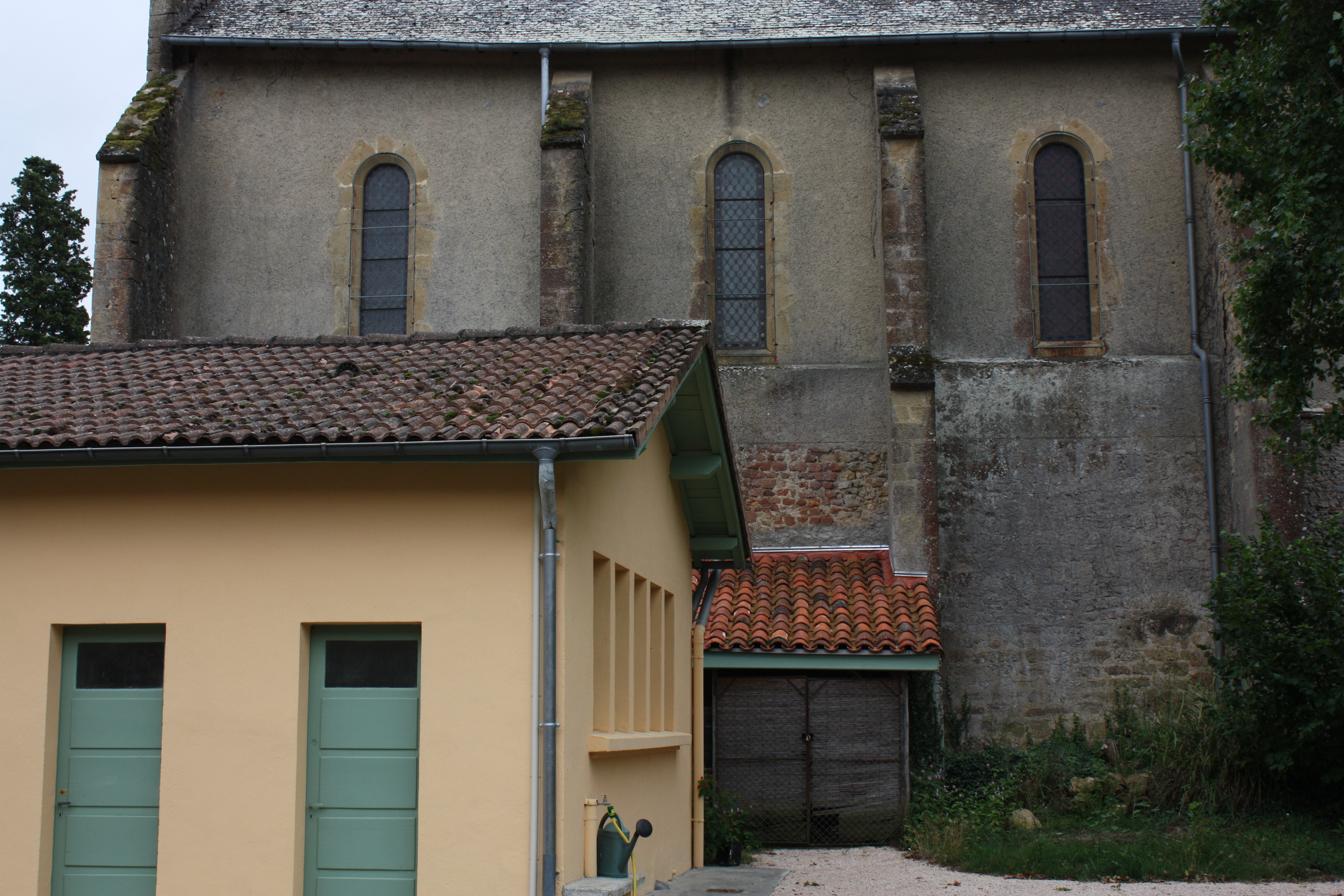
- The church in Saint-Justin
- Location of Saint-Justin
- Location within France Location within Occitanie
- Coordinates: 43°29′00″N 0°09′07″E
- Country: France
- Region: Occitania
- Department: Gers
- Arrondissement: Mirande
- Canton: Pardiac-Rivière-Basse
- Intercommunality: Bastides et vallons du Gers

Government
  - Mayor (2020–2026): Nicole Despouy
- Area^{1}: 13.18 km^{2} (5.09 sq mi)
- Elevation: 259 m (850 ft)
- Highest elevation: 266 m (873 ft)
- Lowest elevation: 146 m (479 ft)
- Population (2023): 137
  - Density: 10.4/km^{2} (26.9/sq mi)
- Time zone: UTC+01:00 (CET)
  - Summer (DST): UTC+02:00 (CEST)
- INSEE/Postal code: 32383 /32230
- ^{1} French Land Register data, which excludes lakes, ponds, glaciers > 1 km^{2} (0.386 sq mi or 247 acres) and river estuaries.

Saint-Justin (French pronunciation: [sɛ̃ ʒystɛ̃]; Occitan: Sent Justin) is a commune in the Gers department in southwestern France.

== Geography ==
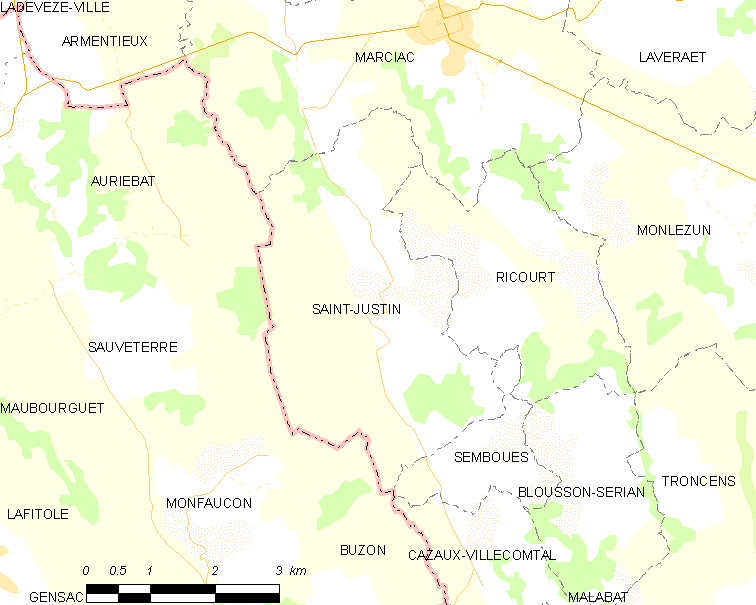
Saint-Justin and its surrounding communes

== Population ==
Historical population
Year	Pop.	±% p.a.
1968	188	—
1975	161	−2.19%
1982	168	+0.61%
1990	145	−1.82%
1999	139	−0.47%
2007	158	+1.61%
2012	146	−1.57%
2017	130	−2.29%
2023	137	+0.88%
Source: INSEE

== See also ==
- Communes of the Gers department
