= Monclar-sur-Losse =

- Commune
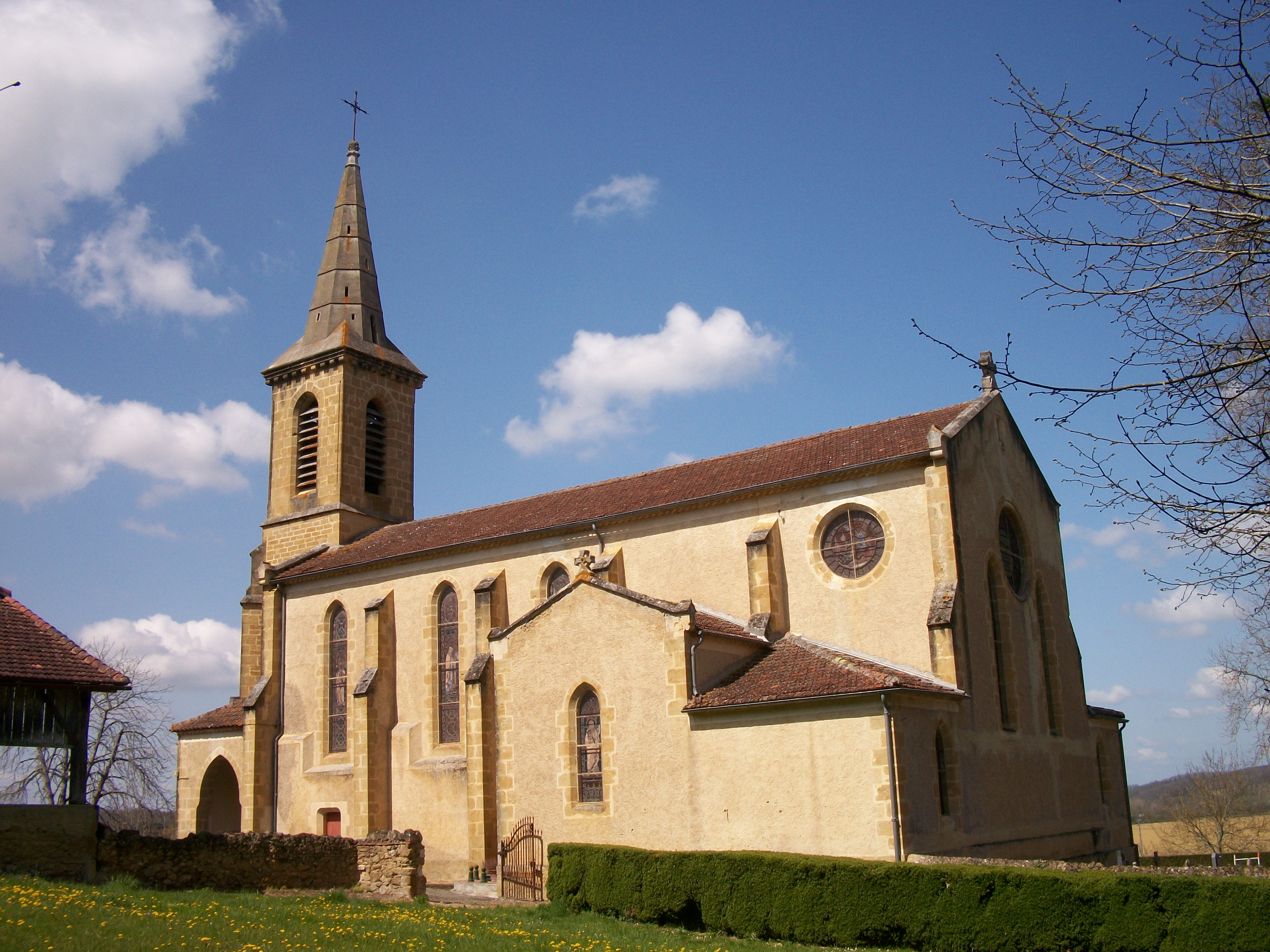
- The church in Monclar-sur-Losse
- Location of Monclar-sur-Losse
- Location within France Location within Occitanie
- Coordinates: 43°31′57″N 0°20′02″E
- Country: France
- Region: Occitania
- Department: Gers
- Arrondissement: Mirande
- Canton: Pardiac-Rivière-Basse
- Intercommunality: Cœur d'Astarac en Gascogne

Government
  - Mayor (2020–2026): Benoît Laprebende
- Area^{1}: 10.47 km^{2} (4.04 sq mi)
- Elevation: 169 m (554 ft)
- Highest elevation: 267 m (876 ft)
- Lowest elevation: 164 m (538 ft)
- Population (2023): 111
  - Density: 10.6/km^{2} (27.5/sq mi)
- Time zone: UTC+01:00 (CET)
  - Summer (DST): UTC+02:00 (CEST)
- INSEE/Postal code: 32265 /32300
- ^{1} French Land Register data, which excludes lakes, ponds, glaciers > 1 km^{2} (0.386 sq mi or 247 acres) and river estuaries.

Monclar-sur-Losse (French pronunciation: [mɔ̃klaʁ syʁ lɔs], literally Monclar on the Osse; Occitan: Montclar sus l'Òssa) is a commune in the Gers department in southwestern France.

== Geography ==
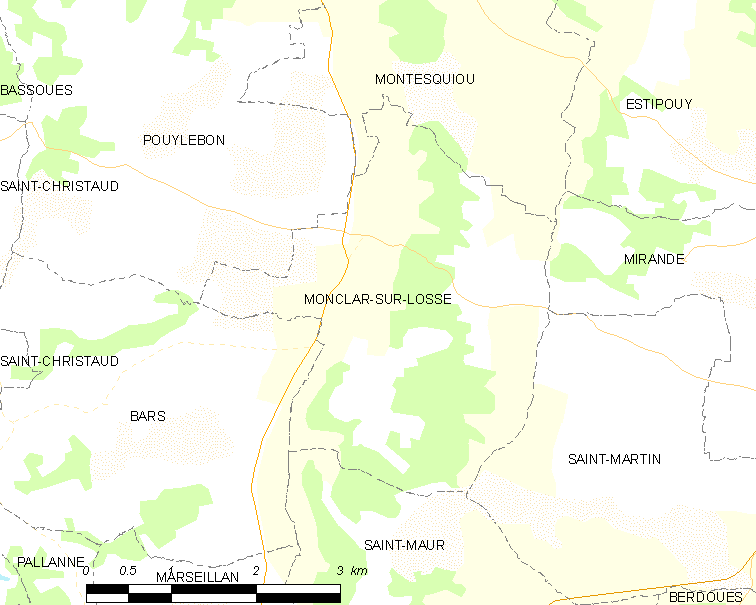
Monclar-sur-Losse and its surrounding communes

== Population ==
Historical population
Year	Pop.	±% p.a.
1968	118	—
1975	113	−0.62%
1982	126	+1.57%
1990	125	−0.10%
1999	102	−2.23%
2007	131	+3.18%
2012	105	−4.33%
2017	106	+0.19%
2023	111	+0.77%
Source: INSEE

== See also ==
- Communes of the Gers department
