= Préchac-sur-Adour =

- Commune
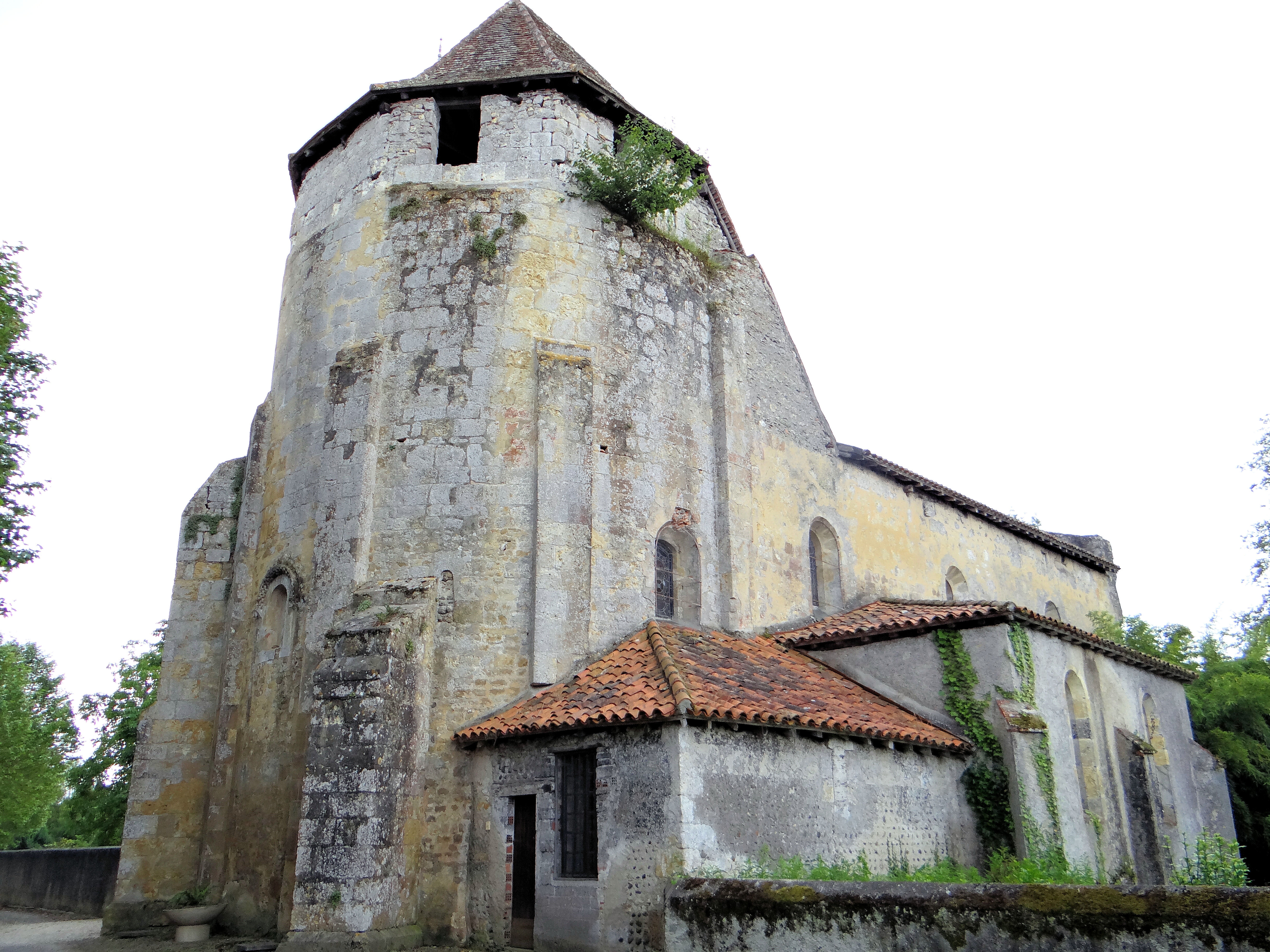
- The church in Préchac-sur-Adour
- Location of Préchac-sur-Adour
- Location within France Location within Occitanie
- Coordinates: 43°36′11″N 0°00′05″W
- Country: France
- Region: Occitania
- Department: Gers
- Arrondissement: Mirande
- Canton: Pardiac-Rivière-Basse
- Intercommunality: Bastides et vallons du Gers

Government
  - Mayor (2024–2026): François Lassalle
- Area^{1}: 4.37 km^{2} (1.69 sq mi)
- Elevation: 132 m (433 ft)
- Highest elevation: 142 m (466 ft)
- Lowest elevation: 126 m (413 ft)
- Population (2023): 197
  - Density: 45.1/km^{2} (117/sq mi)
- Time zone: UTC+01:00 (CET)
  - Summer (DST): UTC+02:00 (CEST)
- INSEE/Postal code: 32330 /32160
- ^{1} French Land Register data, which excludes lakes, ponds, glaciers > 1 km^{2} (0.386 sq mi or 247 acres) and river estuaries.

Préchac-sur-Adour (French pronunciation: [pʁeʃak syʁ aduʁ], literally Préchac on Adour; Occitan: Preishac d'Ador) is a commune in the Gers department in southwestern France.

== Geography ==
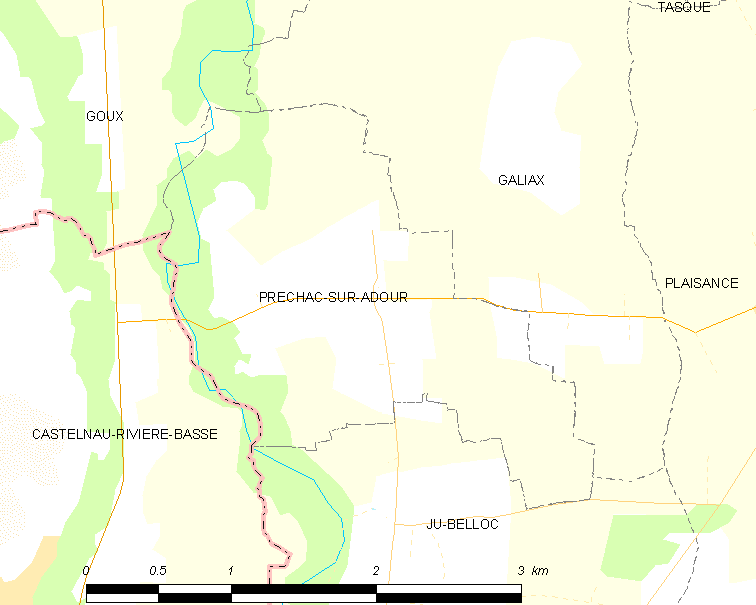
Préchac-sur-Adour and its surrounding communes

== Population ==
Historical population
Year	Pop.	±% p.a.
1968	191	—
1975	190	−0.07%
1982	190	+0.00%
1990	212	+1.38%
1999	213	+0.05%
2007	214	+0.06%
2012	208	−0.57%
2017	199	−0.88%
2023	197	−0.17%
Source: INSEE

== See also ==
- Communes of the Gers department
