= Armentieux =

- Commune
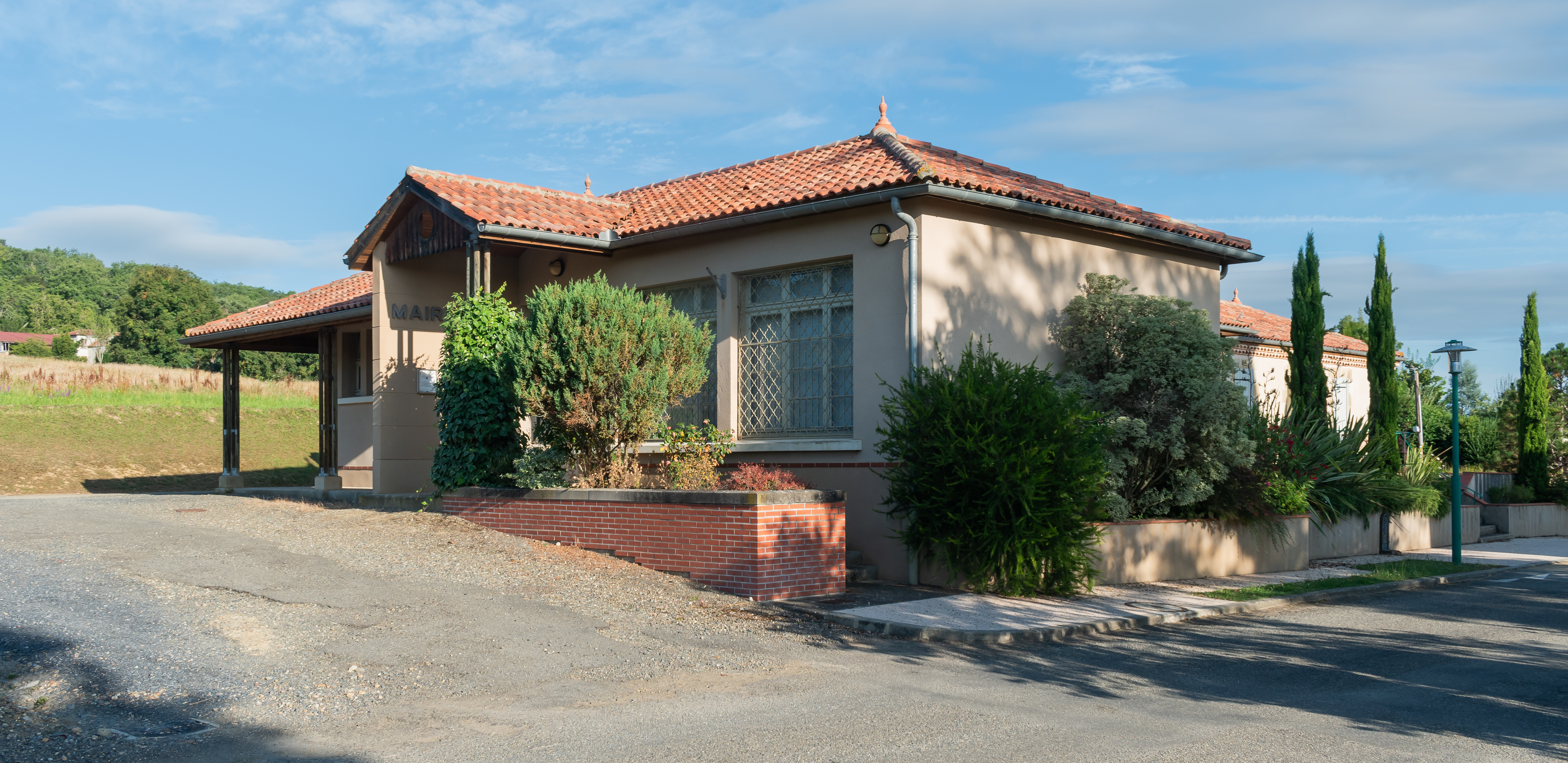
- Town hall of Armentieux
- Location of Armentieux
- Location within France Location within Occitanie
- Coordinates: 43°31′16″N 0°05′30″E
- Country: France
- Region: Occitania
- Department: Gers
- Arrondissement: Mirande
- Canton: Pardiac-Rivière-Basse
- Intercommunality: CC Bastides Vallons Gers

Government
  - Mayor (2020–2026): Patrick Larribat
- Area^{1}: 4.83 km^{2} (1.86 sq mi)
- Elevation: 159 m (522 ft)
- Highest elevation: 221 m (725 ft)
- Lowest elevation: 141 m (463 ft)
- Population (2023): 73
  - Density: 15/km^{2} (39/sq mi)
- Time zone: UTC+01:00 (CET)
  - Summer (DST): UTC+02:00 (CEST)
- INSEE/Postal code: 32008 /32230
- ^{1} French Land Register data, which excludes lakes, ponds, glaciers > 1 km^{2} (0.386 sq mi or 247 acres) and river estuaries.

Armentieux (Occitan: Armentiu) is a commune in the Gers department in southwestern France.

== Geography ==
Armentieux is located in the canton of Pardiac-Rivière-Basse and in the arrondissement of Mirande.

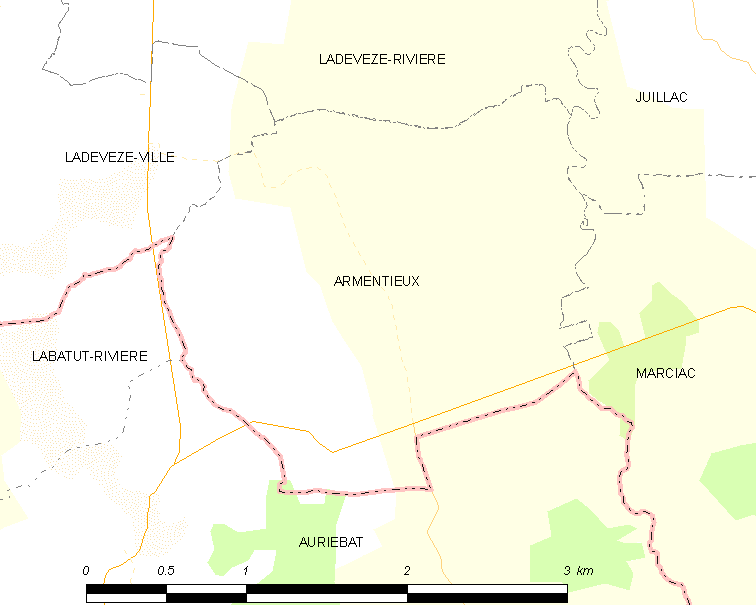
Map of Armentieux and its surrounding communes

== Population ==
Historical population
Year	Pop.	±% p.a.
1968	93	—
1975	76	−2.84%
1982	79	+0.55%
1990	71	−1.33%
1999	76	+0.76%
2007	76	+0.00%
2012	84	+2.02%
2017	76	−1.98%
2023	73	−0.67%
Source: INSEE

== See also ==
- Communes of the Gers department
