= Saint-Aunix-Lengros =

- Commune
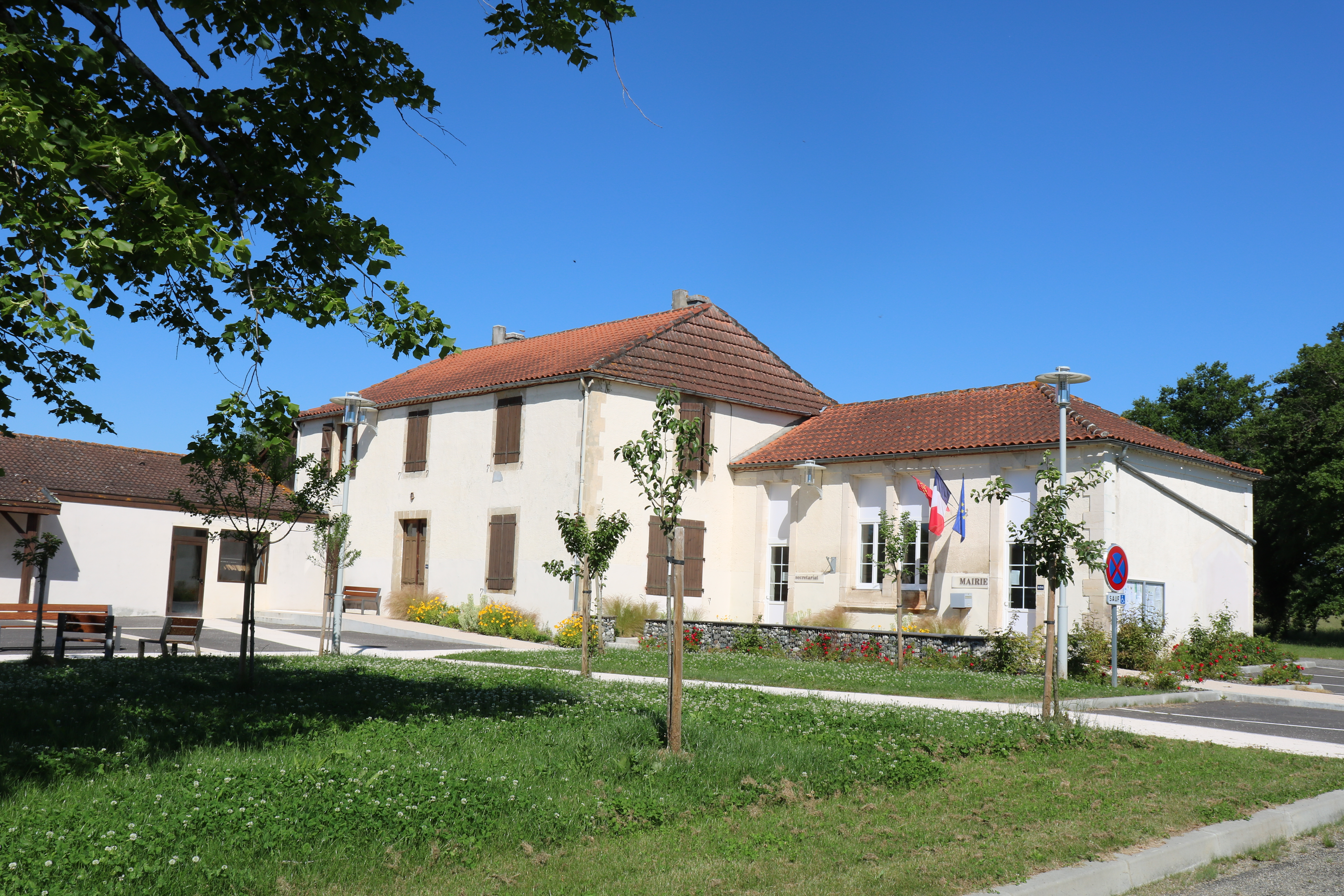
- The town hall in Saint-Aunix-Lengros

- Coat of arms
- Location of Saint-Aunix-Lengros
- Location within France Location within Occitanie
- Coordinates: 43°34′44″N 0°03′09″E
- Country: France
- Region: Occitania
- Department: Gers
- Arrondissement: Mirande
- Canton: Pardiac-Rivière-Basse

Government
  - Mayor (2020–2026): Sandie Lefetz
- Area^{1}: 5.36 km^{2} (2.07 sq mi)
- Elevation: 140 m (460 ft)
- Highest elevation: 202 m (663 ft)
- Lowest elevation: 131 m (430 ft)
- Population (2023): 151
  - Density: 28.2/km^{2} (73.0/sq mi)
- Time zone: UTC+01:00 (CET)
  - Summer (DST): UTC+02:00 (CEST)
- INSEE/Postal code: 32362 /32160
- ^{1} French Land Register data, which excludes lakes, ponds, glaciers > 1 km^{2} (0.386 sq mi or 247 acres) and river estuaries.

Saint-Aunix-Lengros is a commune in the Gers department in southwestern France.

== Geography ==
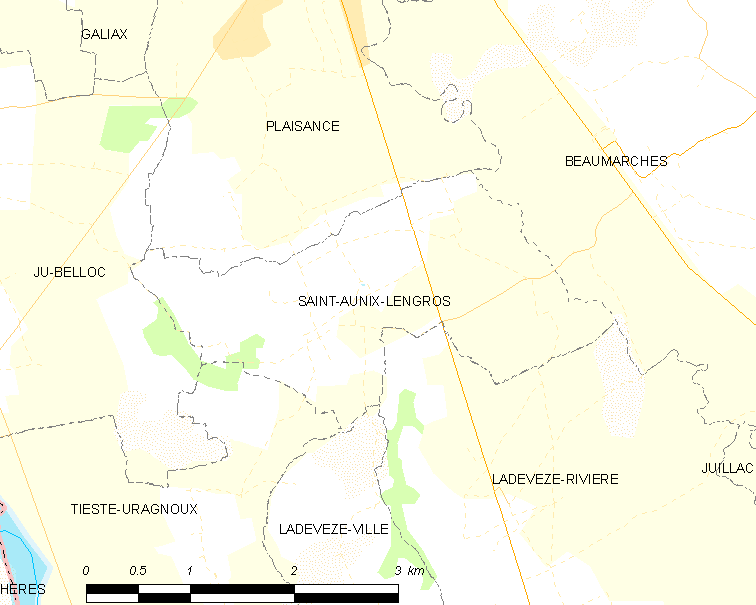
Saint-Aunix-Lengros and its surrounding communes

== Population ==
Historical population
Year	Pop.	±% p.a.
1968	130	—
1975	145	+1.57%
1982	145	+0.00%
1990	146	+0.09%
1999	117	−2.43%
2007	147	+2.89%
2012	151	+0.54%
2017	142	−1.22%
2023	151	+1.03%
Source: INSEE

== See also ==
- Communes of the Gers department
