= Arblade-le-Bas =

- Commune
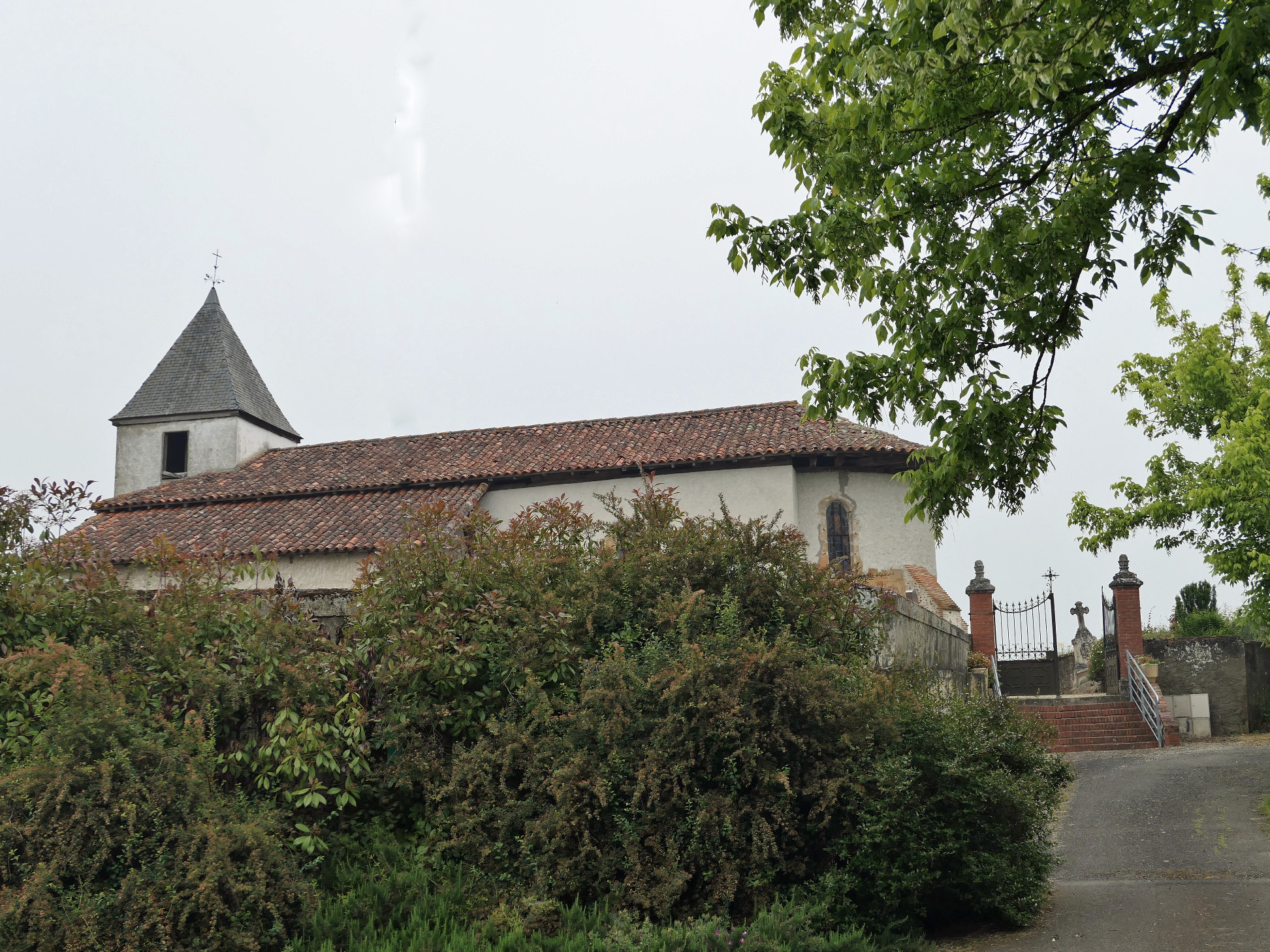
- The church in Arblade-le-Bas

- Coat of arms
- Location of Arblade-le-Bas
- Location within France Location within Occitanie
- Coordinates: 43°42′30″N 0°10′33″W
- Country: France
- Region: Occitania
- Department: Gers
- Arrondissement: Mirande
- Canton: Adour-Gersoise
- Intercommunality: Aire-sur-l'Adour

Government
  - Mayor (2020–2026): Stéphane Leblond
- Area^{1}: 7.67 km^{2} (2.96 sq mi)
- Elevation: 151 m (495 ft)
- Highest elevation: 187 m (614 ft)
- Lowest elevation: 91 m (299 ft)
- Population (2023): 134
  - Density: 17.5/km^{2} (45.2/sq mi)
- Time zone: UTC+01:00 (CET)
  - Summer (DST): UTC+02:00 (CEST)
- INSEE/Postal code: 32004 /32720
- ^{1} French Land Register data, which excludes lakes, ponds, glaciers > 1 km^{2} (0.386 sq mi or 247 acres) and river estuaries.

Arblade-le-Bas (French pronunciation: [aʁblad lə ba]; Occitan: Arblada lo Baish) is a commune in the Gers department in southwestern France.

== Geography ==
Arblade-le-Bas is located in the canton of Adour-Gersoise and in the arrondissement of Mirande.

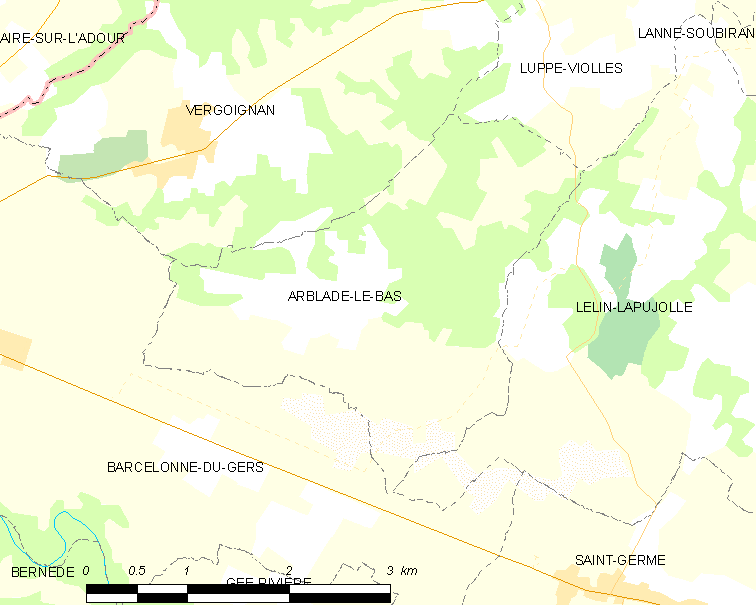
Map of Arblade-le-Bas and its surrounding communes

The commune is bordered by four other communes: Vergoignan to the northwest, Luppé-Violles to the northeast, Lelin-Lapujolle to the east, and finally by Barcelonne-du-Gers to the southwest.

== Population ==
Historical population
| Year | Pop. | ±% p.a. |
|---|---|---|
| 1968 | 99 | — |
| 1975 | 106 | +0.98% |
| 1982 | 107 | +0.13% |
| 1990 | 111 | +0.46% |
| 1999 | 109 | −0.20% |
| 2007 | 130 | +2.23% |
| 2012 | 151 | +3.04% |
| 2017 | 147 | −0.54% |
| 2023 | 134 | −1.53% |
Source: INSEE

== See also ==
- Communes of the Gers department
