= Abel Gardey =

French politician (1882–1957)

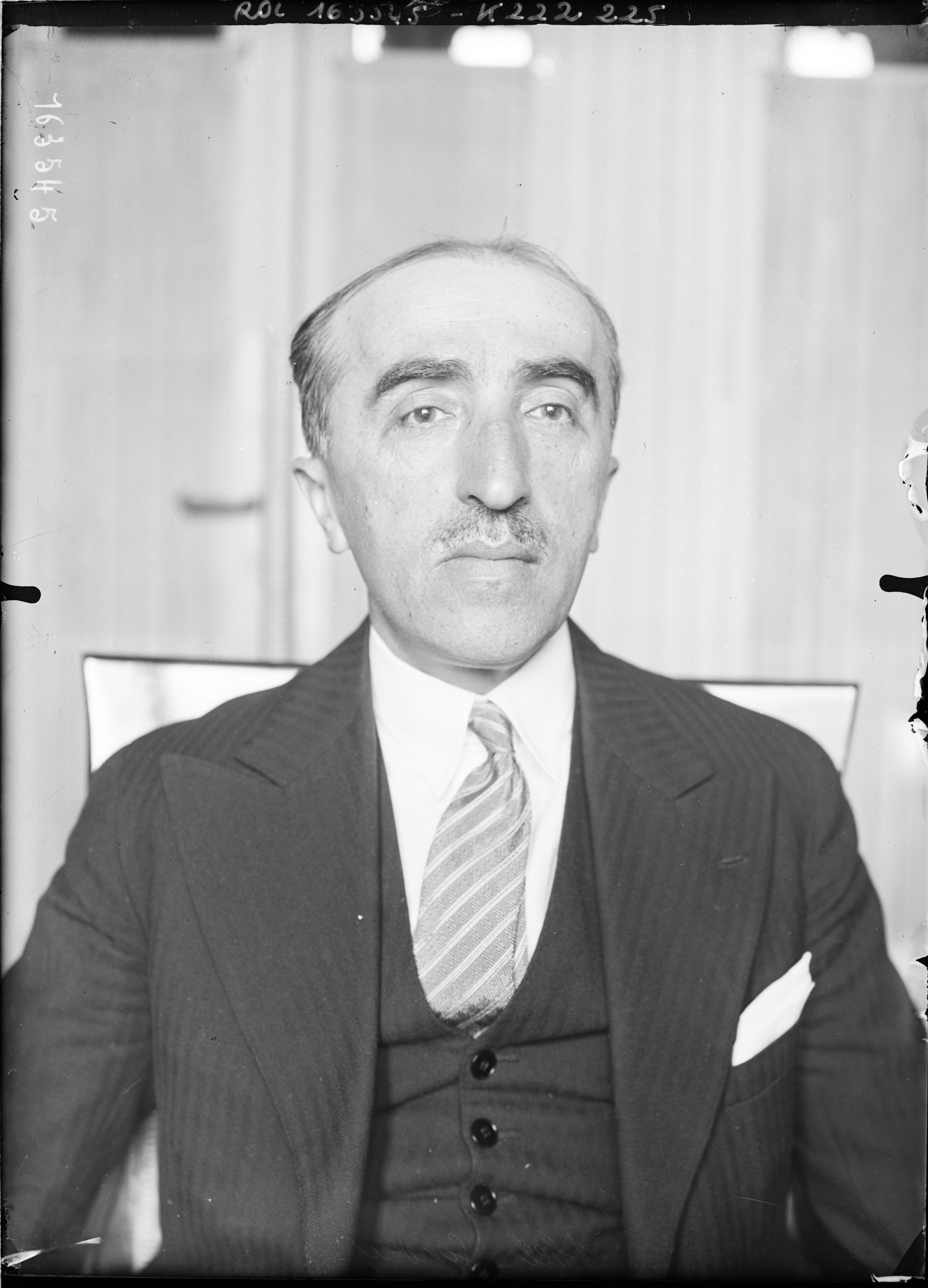
Gardey in 1932

Abel Gardey (21 November 1882, Margouët-Meymes, Gers – 23 September 1957, Pouylebon) was a French politician belonging to the Radical Party. He served as the Minister of Agriculture in the third Herriot government. In 1933, he was the French Minister of Budget. He later became the general reporter for the Senate finance commission and was described as a "bastion of orthodox economics" in May 1939.

On 10 July 1940, he voted as a Senator in favour of granting the cabinet presided by Marshal Philippe Pétain authority to draw up a new constitution, thereby effectively ending the French Third Republic and establishing Vichy France.
