= Canton of Adour-Gersoise =

Administrative division of Gers department, France

Coordinates: 43.66°N 0.08°W

The canton of Adour-Gersoise is an administrative division of the Gers department, southwestern France. It was created at the French canton reorganisation which came into effect in March 2015. Its capital is in Riscle.

It consists of the following communes:

1. Aignan
2. Arblade-le-Bas
3. Aurensan
4. Avéron-Bergelle
5. Barcelonne-du-Gers
6. Bernède
7. Bouzon-Gellenave
8. Cahuzac-sur-Adour
9. Castelnavet
10. Caumont
11. Corneillan
12. Fustérouau
13. Gée-Rivière
14. Goux
15. Labarthète
16. Lannux
17. Lelin-Lapujolle
18. Loussous-Débat
19. Margouët-Meymes
20. Maulichères
21. Maumusson-Laguian
22. Pouydraguin
23. Projan
24. Riscle
25. Sabazan
26. Saint-Germé
27. Saint-Mont
28. Sarragachies
29. Ségos
30. Tarsac
31. Termes-d'Armagnac
32. Vergoignan
33. Verlus
34. Viella
