= Labarthète =

- Commune
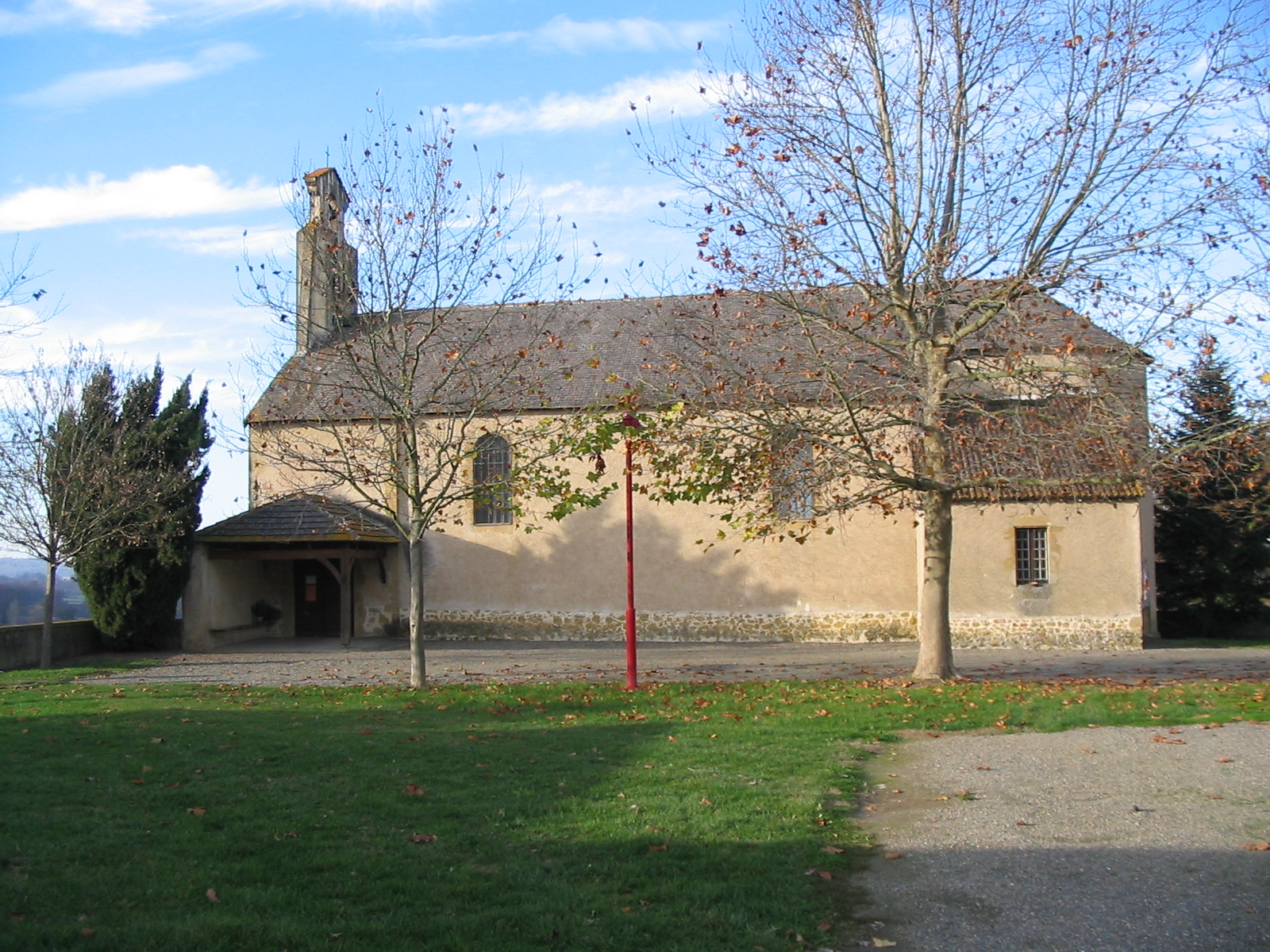
- The church in Labarthète
- Location of Labarthète
- Location within France Location within Occitanie
- Coordinates: 43°37′50″N 0°09′19″W
- Country: France
- Region: Occitania
- Department: Gers
- Arrondissement: Mirande
- Canton: Adour-Gersoise

Government
  - Mayor (2020–2026): Philippe Dufau
- Area^{1}: 11.09 km^{2} (4.28 sq mi)
- Elevation: 210 m (690 ft)
- Highest elevation: 233 m (764 ft)
- Lowest elevation: 99 m (325 ft)
- Population (2023): 145
  - Density: 13.1/km^{2} (33.9/sq mi)
- Time zone: UTC+01:00 (CET)
  - Summer (DST): UTC+02:00 (CEST)
- INSEE/Postal code: 32170 /32400
- ^{1} French Land Register data, which excludes lakes, ponds, glaciers > 1 km^{2} (0.386 sq mi or 247 acres) and river estuaries.

Labarthète (French pronunciation: [labaʁtɛt]; Occitan: La Barteta) is a commune in the Gers département in southwestern France.

== Geography ==
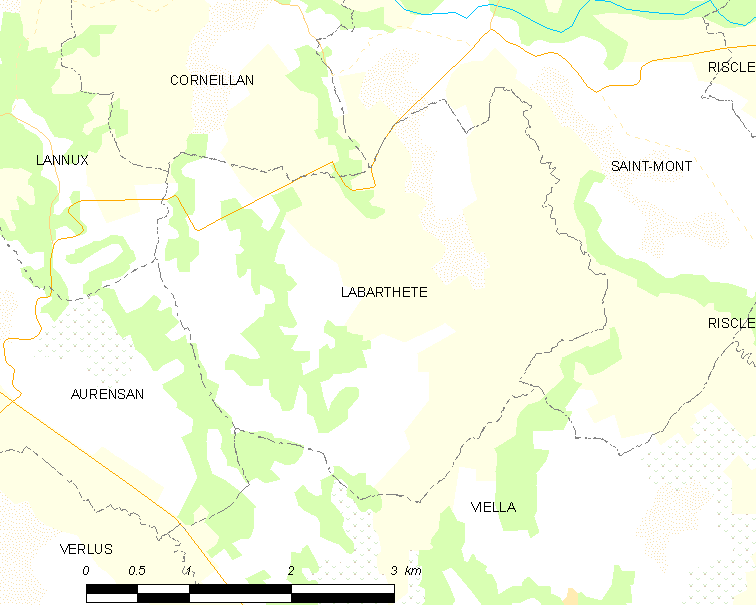
Labarthète and its surrounding communes

== Population ==
Historical population
Year	Pop.	±% p.a.
1968	205	—
1975	151	−4.27%
1982	154	+0.28%
1990	150	−0.33%
1999	137	−1.00%
2007	145	+0.71%
2012	143	−0.28%
2017	140	−0.42%
2023	145	+0.59%
Source: INSEE

== See also ==
- Communes of the Gers department
