= Maulichères =

- Commune
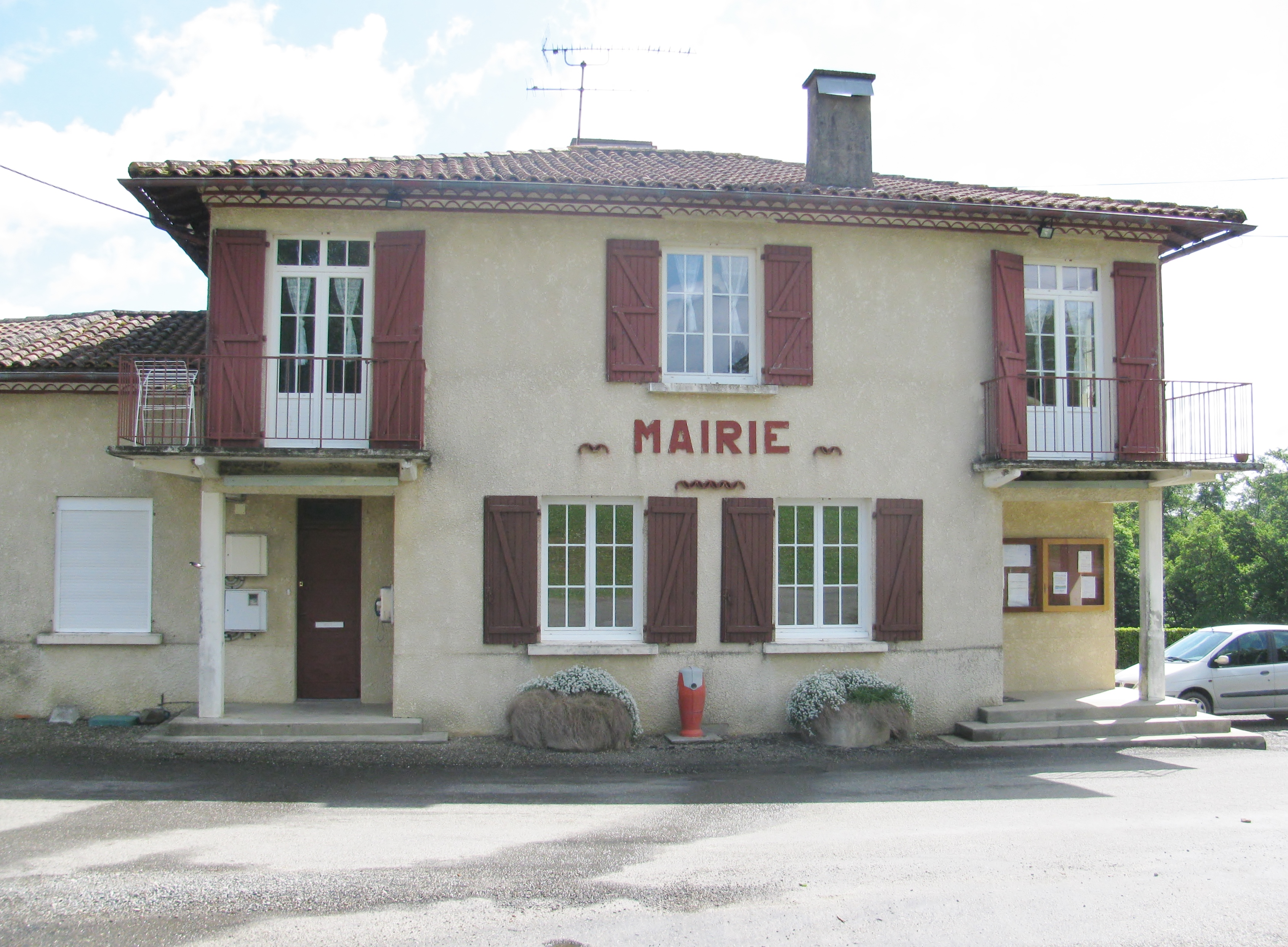
- The town hall in Maulichères
- Location of Maulichères
- Location within France Location within Occitanie
- Coordinates: 43°41′24″N 0°05′20″W
- Country: France
- Region: Occitania
- Department: Gers
- Arrondissement: Mirande
- Canton: Adour-Gersoise

Government
  - Mayor (2020–2026): Éric Darroux
- Area^{1}: 6.18 km^{2} (2.39 sq mi)
- Elevation: 172 m (564 ft)
- Highest elevation: 176 m (577 ft)
- Lowest elevation: 103 m (338 ft)
- Population (2023): 155
  - Density: 25.1/km^{2} (65.0/sq mi)
- Time zone: UTC+01:00 (CET)
  - Summer (DST): UTC+02:00 (CEST)
- INSEE/Postal code: 32244 /32400
- ^{1} French Land Register data, which excludes lakes, ponds, glaciers > 1 km^{2} (0.386 sq mi or 247 acres) and river estuaries.

Maulichères (French pronunciation: [moliʃɛʁ]; Occitan: Maulishèra) is a commune in the Gers department in southwestern France.

== Geography ==
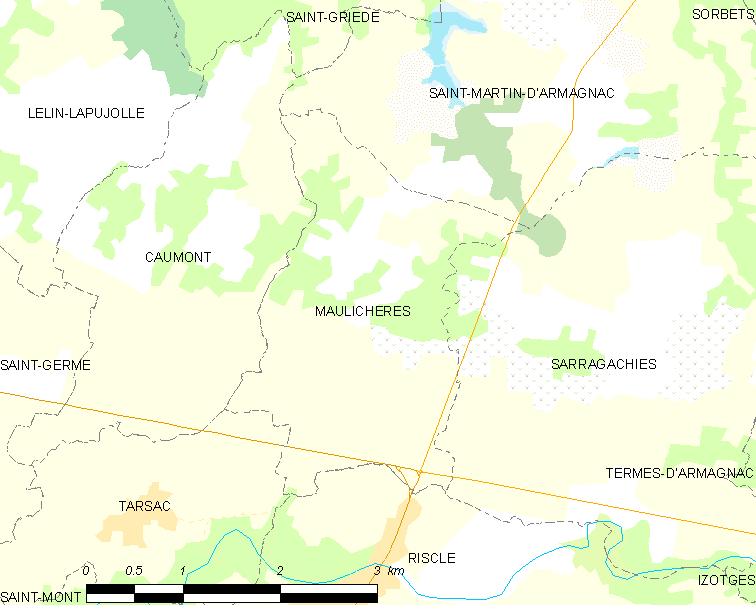
Maulichères and its surrounding communes

== Population ==
Historical population
Year	Pop.	±% p.a.
1968	179	—
1975	171	−0.65%
1982	173	+0.17%
1990	207	+2.27%
1999	185	−1.24%
2007	155	−2.19%
2012	172	+2.10%
2017	169	−0.35%
2023	155	−1.43%
Source: INSEE

== See also ==
- Communes of the Gers department
