= Fustérouau =

- Commune
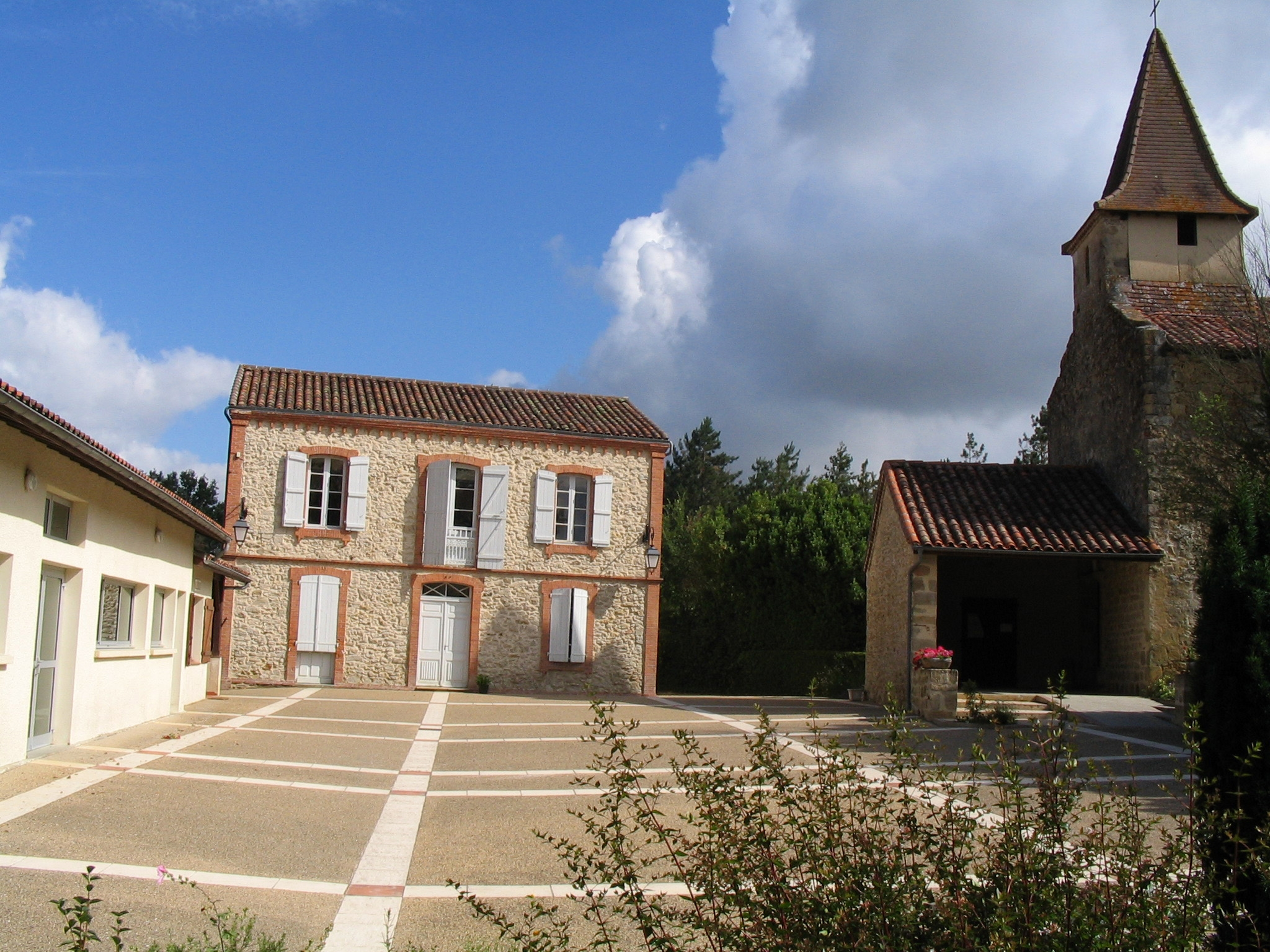
- The town hall and church in Fustérouau
- Location of Fustérouau
- Location within France Location within Occitanie
- Coordinates: 43°41′14″N 0°00′14″E
- Country: France
- Region: Occitania
- Department: Gers
- Arrondissement: Mirande
- Canton: Adour-Gersoise

Government
  - Mayor (2020–2026): Jean-Pierre Musset
- Area^{1}: 7.85 km^{2} (3.03 sq mi)
- Elevation: 115 m (377 ft)
- Highest elevation: 196 m (643 ft)
- Lowest elevation: 103 m (338 ft)
- Population (2023): 125
  - Density: 15.9/km^{2} (41.2/sq mi)
- Time zone: UTC+01:00 (CET)
  - Summer (DST): UTC+02:00 (CEST)
- INSEE/Postal code: 32135 /32400
- ^{1} French Land Register data, which excludes lakes, ponds, glaciers > 1 km^{2} (0.386 sq mi or 247 acres) and river estuaries.

Fustérouau (French pronunciation: [fysteʁwo]; Occitan: Fustarroau) is a commune in the Gers department in southwestern France.

== Geography ==
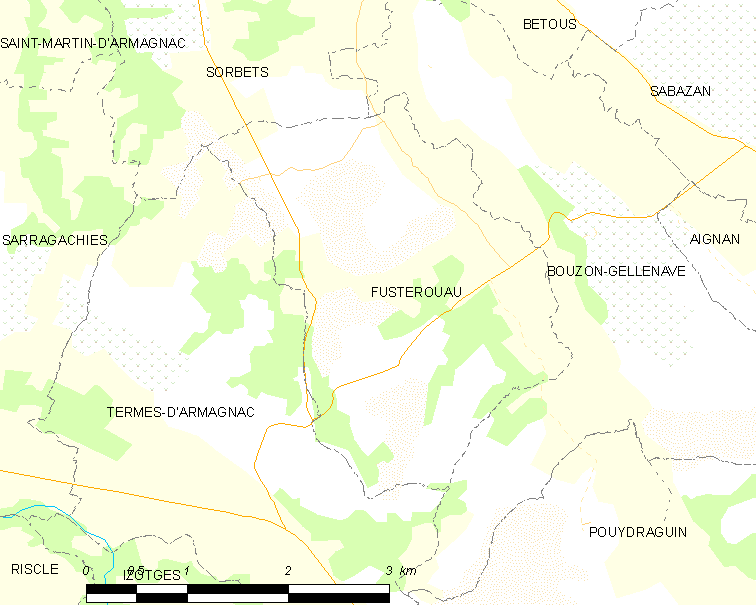
Fustérouau and its surrounding communes

== Population ==
Historical population
Year	Pop.	±% p.a.
1968	149	—
1975	132	−1.72%
1982	120	−1.35%
1990	102	−2.01%
1999	114	+1.24%
2007	127	+1.36%
2012	128	+0.16%
2017	134	+0.92%
2023	125	−1.15%
Source: INSEE

== See also ==
- Communes of the Gers department
