= Loussous-Débat =

- Commune
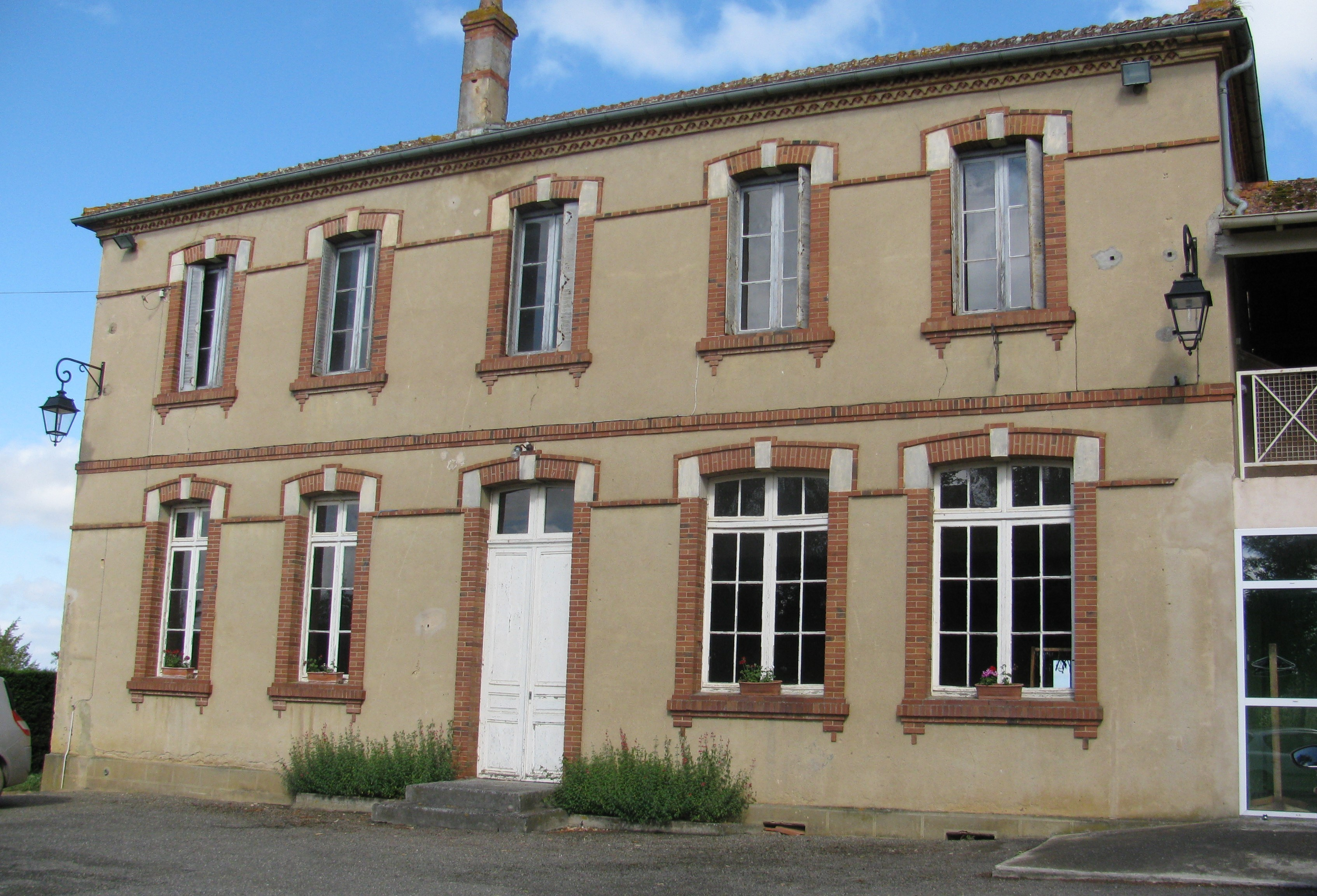
- The town hall in Loussous-Débat
- Location of Loussous-Débat
- Location within France Location within Occitanie
- Coordinates: 43°39′14″N 0°04′28″E
- Country: France
- Region: Occitania
- Department: Gers
- Arrondissement: Mirande
- Canton: Adour-Gersoise

Government
  - Mayor (2020–2026): Alain Baude
- Area^{1}: 5.07 km^{2} (1.96 sq mi)
- Elevation: 181 m (594 ft)
- Highest elevation: 185 m (607 ft)
- Lowest elevation: 119 m (390 ft)
- Population (2023): 72
  - Density: 14/km^{2} (37/sq mi)
- Time zone: UTC+01:00 (CET)
  - Summer (DST): UTC+02:00 (CEST)
- INSEE/Postal code: 32218 /32290
- ^{1} French Land Register data, which excludes lakes, ponds, glaciers > 1 km^{2} (0.386 sq mi or 247 acres) and river estuaries.

Loussous-Débat is a commune in the Gers department in southwestern France.

== Geography ==
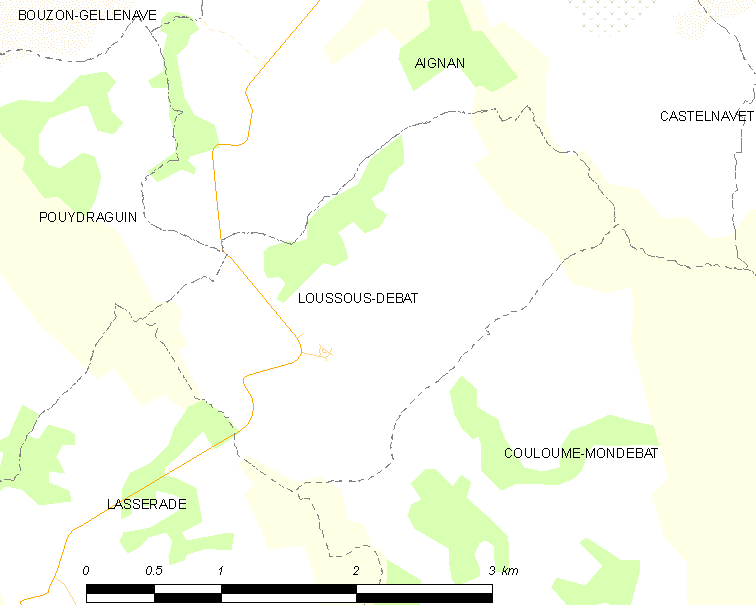
Loussous-Débat and its surrounding communes

== Population ==
Historical population
Year	Pop.	±% p.a.
1968	67	—
1975	63	−0.88%
1982	66	+0.67%
1990	51	−3.17%
1999	56	+1.04%
2007	47	−2.17%
2012	52	+2.04%
2017	62	+3.58%
2023	72	+2.52%
Source: INSEE

== See also ==
- Communes of the Gers department
