= Castelnavet =

- Commune
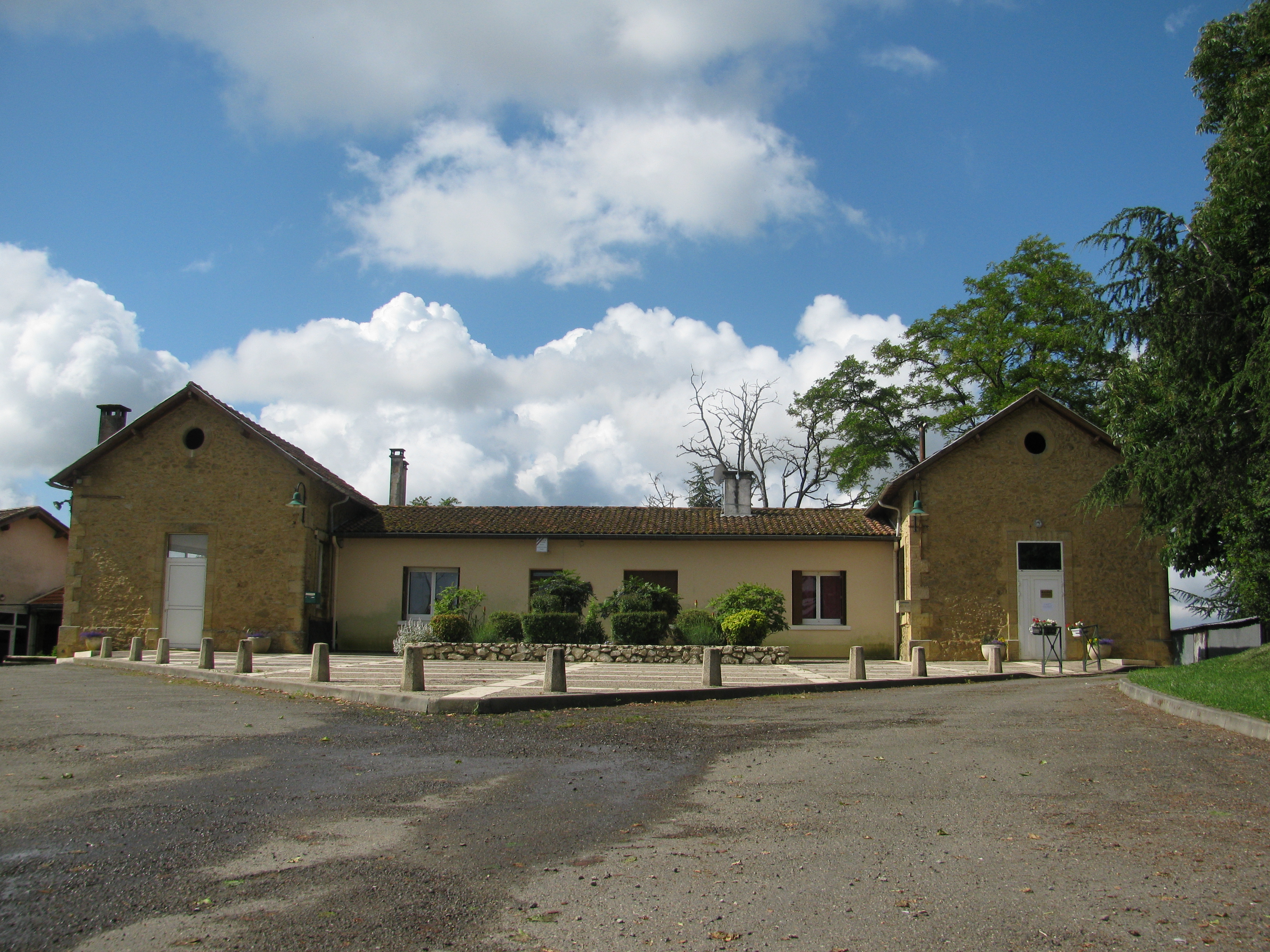
- The town hall in Castelnavet
- Location of Castelnavet
- Location within France Location within Occitanie
- Coordinates: 43°40′28″N 0°07′50″E
- Country: France
- Region: Occitania
- Department: Gers
- Arrondissement: Mirande
- Canton: Adour-Gersoise

Government
  - Mayor (2020–2026): Joël Dagieux
- Area^{1}: 18.06 km^{2} (6.97 sq mi)
- Elevation: 305 m (1,001 ft)
- Highest elevation: 245 m (804 ft)
- Lowest elevation: 125 m (410 ft)
- Population (2023): 108
  - Density: 5.98/km^{2} (15.5/sq mi)
- Time zone: UTC+01:00 (CET)
  - Summer (DST): UTC+02:00 (CEST)
- INSEE/Postal code: 32081 /32290
- ^{1} French Land Register data, which excludes lakes, ponds, glaciers > 1 km^{2} (0.386 sq mi or 247 acres) and river estuaries.

Castelnavet (French pronunciation: [kastɛlnavɛ]; Occitan: Castèthnavèth) is a commune in the Gers department in southwestern France.

== Geography ==
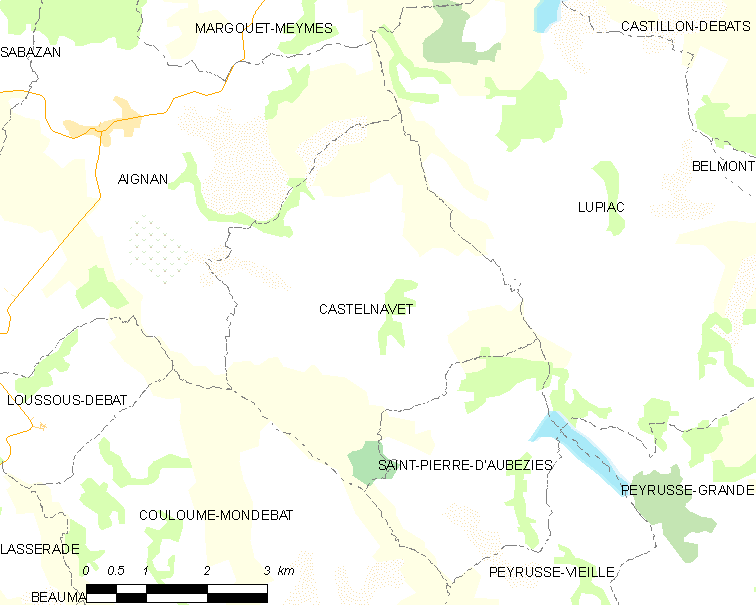
Castelnavet and its surrounding communes

== Population ==
Historical population
Year	Pop.	±% p.a.
1968	224	—
1975	201	−1.54%
1982	154	−3.73%
1990	153	−0.08%
1999	155	+0.14%
2007	148	−0.58%
2012	127	−3.01%
2017	130	+0.47%
2023	108	−3.04%
Source: INSEE

== See also ==
- Communes of the Gers department
