= Tarsac =

- Commune
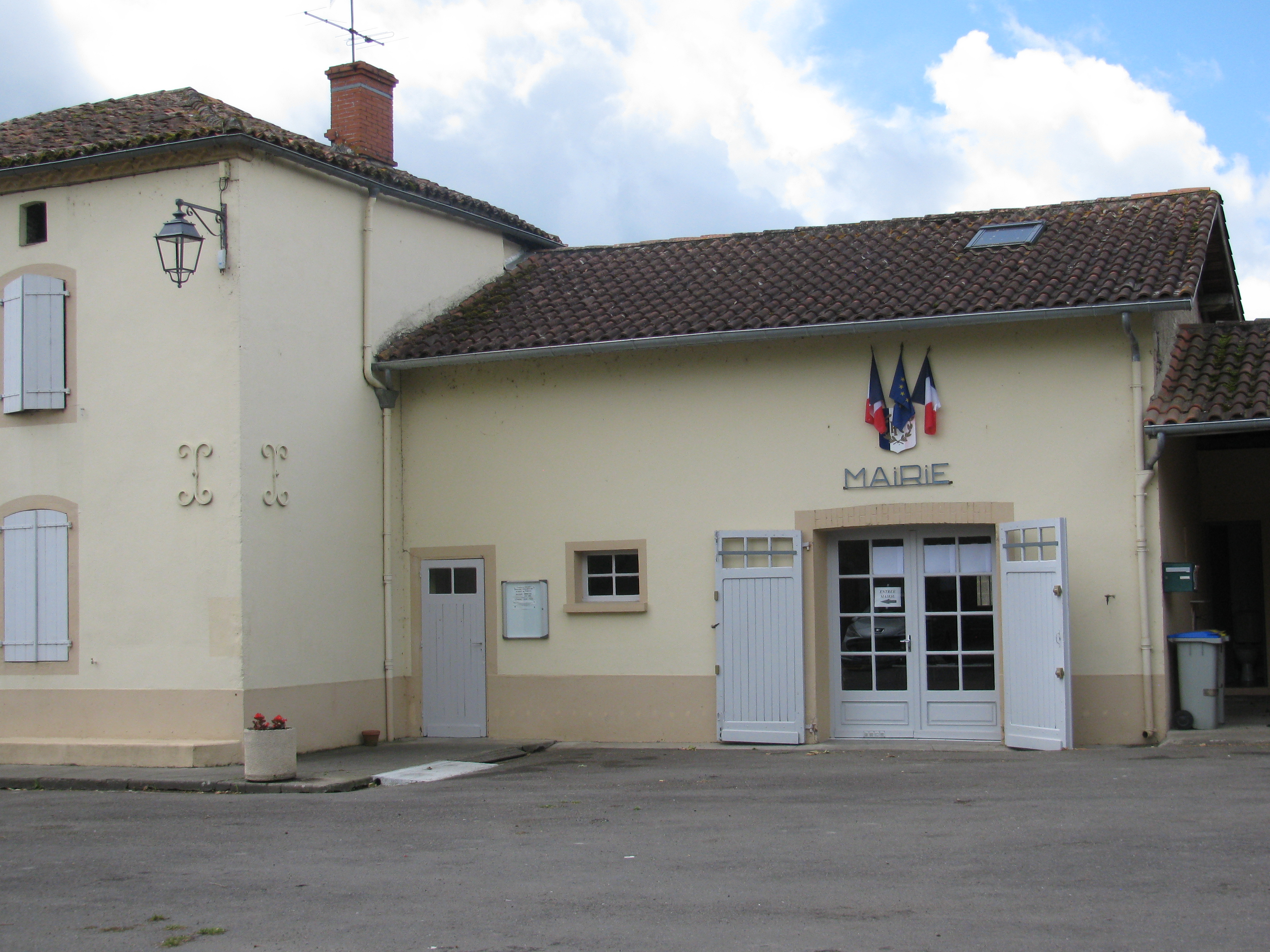
- The town hall in Tarsac
- Location of Tarsac
- Location within France Location within Occitanie
- Coordinates: 43°40′09″N 0°06′41″W
- Country: France
- Region: Occitania
- Department: Gers
- Arrondissement: Mirande
- Canton: Adour-Gersoise

Government
  - Mayor (2020–2026): Jean-Luc Buffalan
- Area^{1}: 4.51 km^{2} (1.74 sq mi)
- Elevation: 100 m (330 ft)
- Highest elevation: 109 m (358 ft)
- Lowest elevation: 95 m (312 ft)
- Population (2023): 164
  - Density: 36.4/km^{2} (94.2/sq mi)
- Time zone: UTC+01:00 (CET)
  - Summer (DST): UTC+02:00 (CEST)
- INSEE/Postal code: 32439 /32400
- ^{1} French Land Register data, which excludes lakes, ponds, glaciers > 1 km^{2} (0.386 sq mi or 247 acres) and river estuaries.

Tarsac (French pronunciation: [taʁsak]) is a commune in the Gers department in southwestern France.

== Geography ==
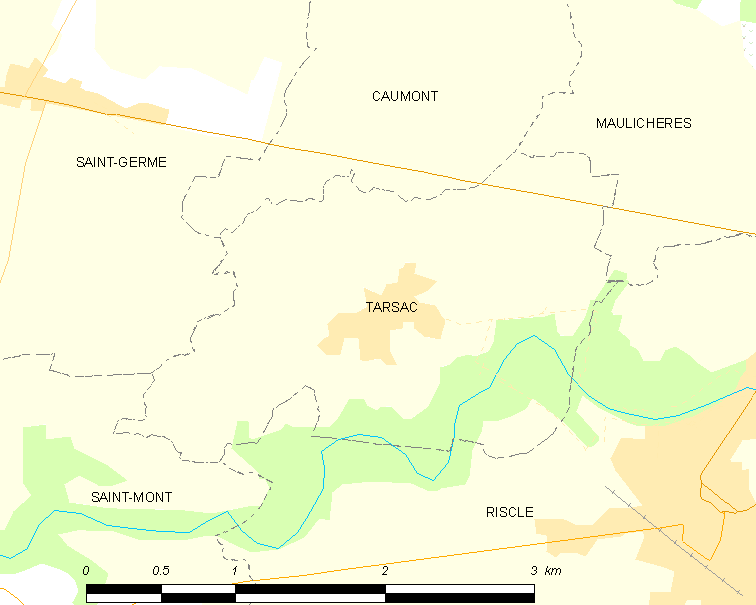
Tarsac and its surrounding communes

== Population ==
Historical population
Year	Pop.	±% p.a.
1968	232	—
1975	205	−1.75%
1982	181	−1.76%
1990	181	+0.00%
1999	161	−1.29%
2007	160	−0.08%
2012	170	+1.22%
2017	168	−0.24%
2023	164	−0.40%
Source: INSEE

== See also ==
- Communes of the Gers department
