= Saint-Germé =

- Commune
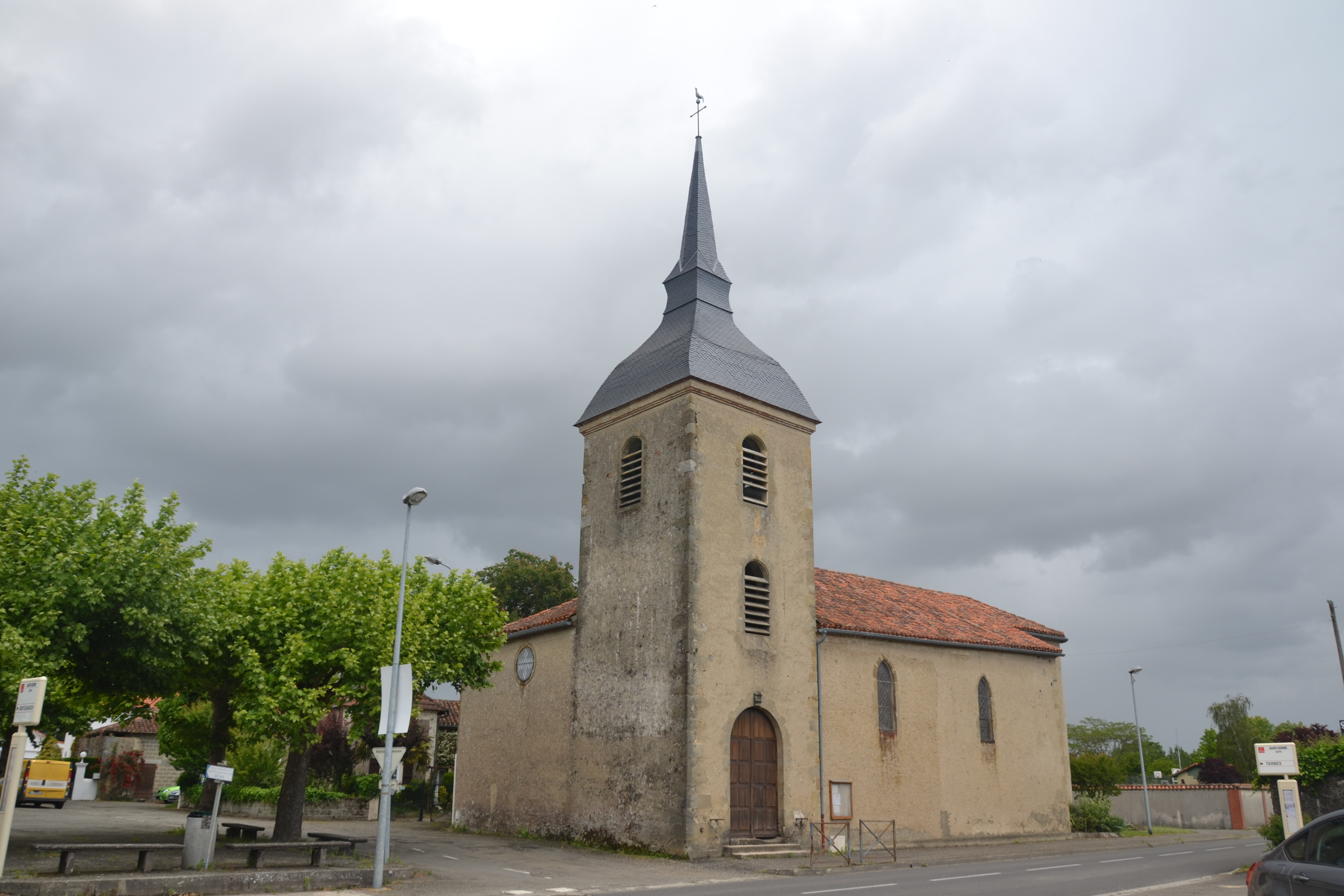
- The church of Saint-Germé
- Location of Saint-Germé
- Location within France Location within Occitanie
- Coordinates: 43°40′52″N 0°08′43″W
- Country: France
- Region: Occitania
- Department: Gers
- Arrondissement: Mirande
- Canton: Adour-Gersoise

Government
  - Mayor (2020–2026): Philippe Poitreau
- Area^{1}: 9.55 km^{2} (3.69 sq mi)
- Elevation: 102 m (335 ft)
- Highest elevation: 110 m (360 ft)
- Lowest elevation: 89 m (292 ft)
- Population (2023): 515
  - Density: 53.9/km^{2} (140/sq mi)
- Time zone: UTC+01:00 (CET)
  - Summer (DST): UTC+02:00 (CEST)
- INSEE/Postal code: 32378 /32400
- ^{1} French Land Register data, which excludes lakes, ponds, glaciers > 1 km^{2} (0.386 sq mi or 247 acres) and river estuaries.

Saint-Germé (French pronunciation: [sɛ̃ ʒɛʁme]; Occitan: Sent Germer) is a commune in the Gers department in southwestern France.

== Geography ==
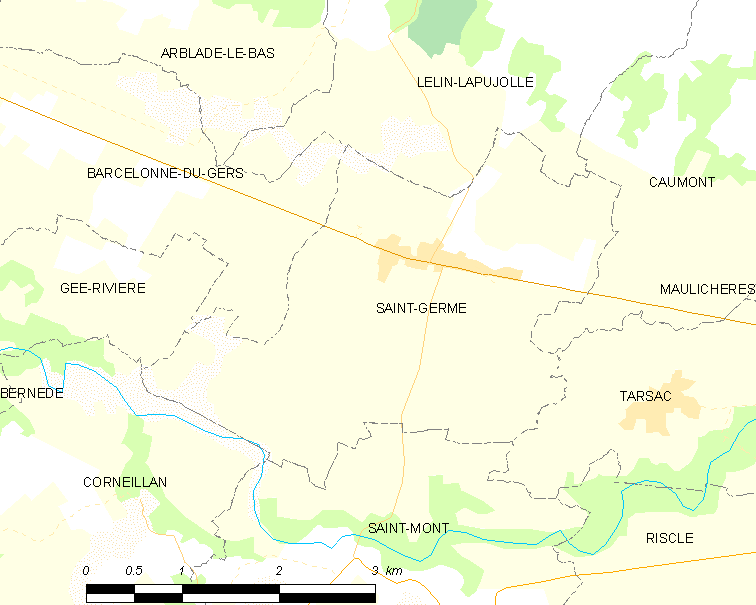
Saint-Germé and its surrounding communes

== Population ==
Historical population
Year	Pop.	±% p.a.
1968	508	—
1975	523	+0.42%
1982	488	−0.98%
1990	471	−0.44%
1999	443	−0.68%
2007	493	+1.35%
2012	480	−0.53%
2017	500	+0.82%
2023	515	+0.49%
Source: INSEE

== See also ==
- Communes of the Gers department
