= Cahuzac-sur-Adour =

- Commune
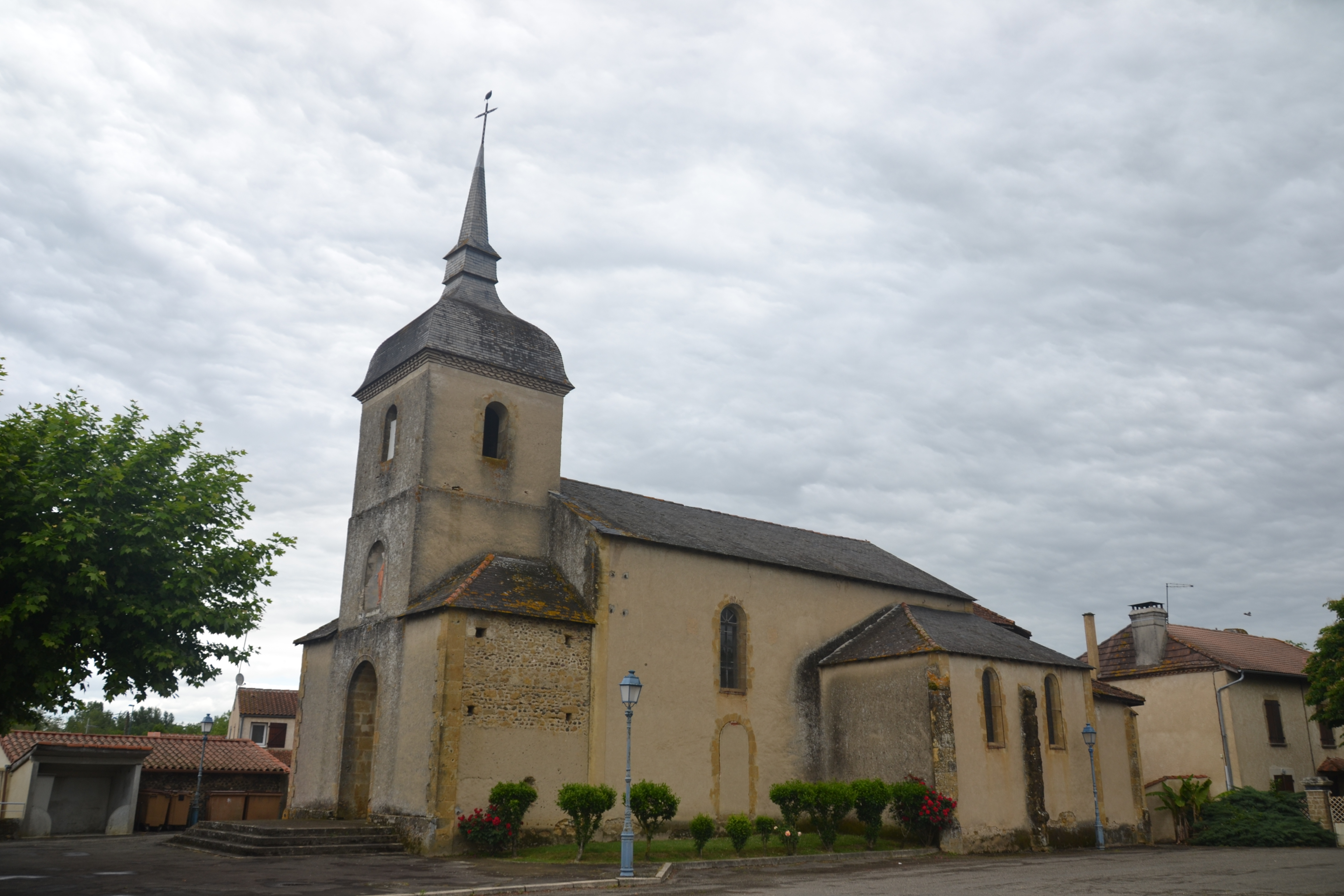
- The church in Cahuzac-sur-Adour
- Location of Cahuzac-sur-Adour
- Location within France Location within Occitanie
- Coordinates: 43°38′23″N 0°01′20″W
- Country: France
- Region: Occitania
- Department: Gers
- Arrondissement: Mirande
- Canton: Adour-Gersoise

Government
  - Mayor (2020–2026): Mireille Aragnouet
- Area^{1}: 6.62 km^{2} (2.56 sq mi)
- Elevation: 120 m (390 ft)
- Highest elevation: 141 m (463 ft)
- Lowest elevation: 112 m (367 ft)
- Population (2023): 204
  - Density: 30.8/km^{2} (79.8/sq mi)
- Time zone: UTC+01:00 (CET)
  - Summer (DST): UTC+02:00 (CEST)
- INSEE/Postal code: 32070 /32400
- ^{1} French Land Register data, which excludes lakes, ponds, glaciers > 1 km^{2} (0.386 sq mi or 247 acres) and river estuaries.

Cahuzac-sur-Adour (French pronunciation: [ka.yzak syʁ aduʁ], literally Cahuzac on Adour; Occitan: Caüsac d'Ador) is a commune in the Gers department in southwestern France.

== Geography ==
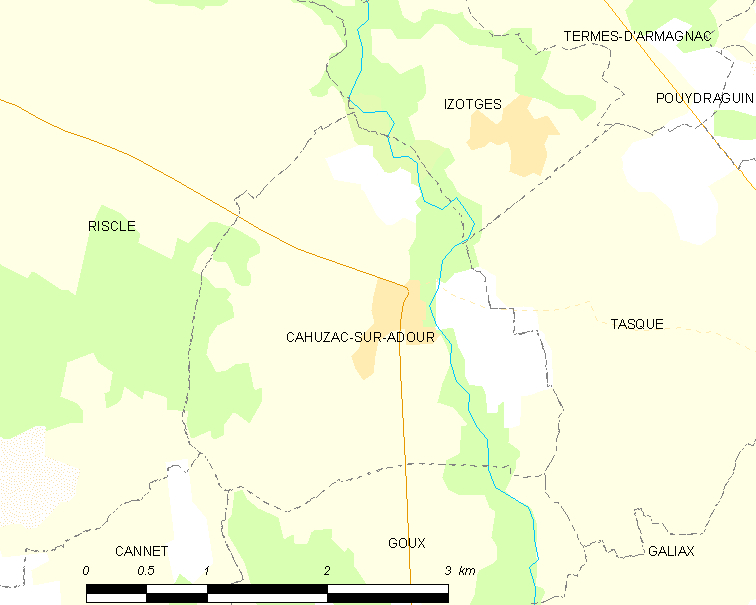
Cahuzac-sur-Adour and its surrounding communes

== Population ==
Historical population
Year	Pop.	±% p.a.
1968	183	—
1975	180	−0.24%
1982	165	−1.24%
1990	145	−1.60%
1999	171	+1.85%
2007	245	+4.60%
2012	237	−0.66%
2017	223	−1.21%
2023	204	−1.47%
Source: INSEE

== See also ==
- Communes of the Gers department
