= Pouydraguin =

- Commune
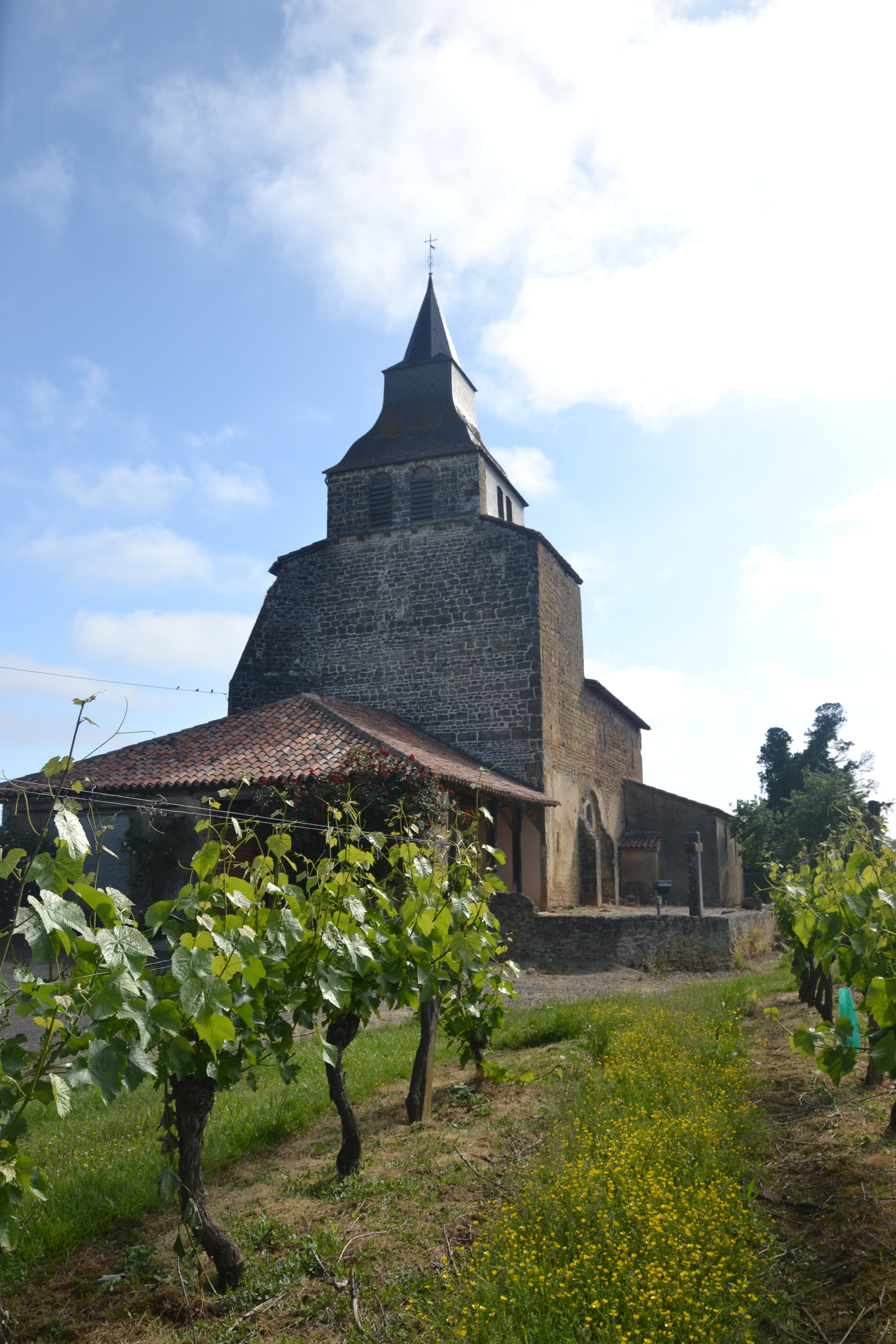
- The church
- Location of Pouydraguin
- Location within France Location within Occitanie
- Coordinates: 43°39′34″N 0°02′18″E
- Country: France
- Region: Occitania
- Department: Gers
- Arrondissement: Mirande
- Canton: Adour-Gersoise

Government
  - Mayor (2020–2026): Bertrand Priouzeau
- Area^{1}: 9.71 km^{2} (3.75 sq mi)
- Elevation: 161 m (528 ft)
- Highest elevation: 222 m (728 ft)
- Lowest elevation: 113 m (371 ft)
- Population (2023): 120
  - Density: 12/km^{2} (32/sq mi)
- Time zone: UTC+01:00 (CET)
  - Summer (DST): UTC+02:00 (CEST)
- INSEE/Postal code: 32325 /32290
- ^{1} French Land Register data, which excludes lakes, ponds, glaciers > 1 km^{2} (0.386 sq mi or 247 acres) and river estuaries.

Pouydraguin (French pronunciation: [pwidʁaɡɛ̃]; Occitan: Poidraguin) is a commune in the Gers department in southwestern France.

== Geography ==
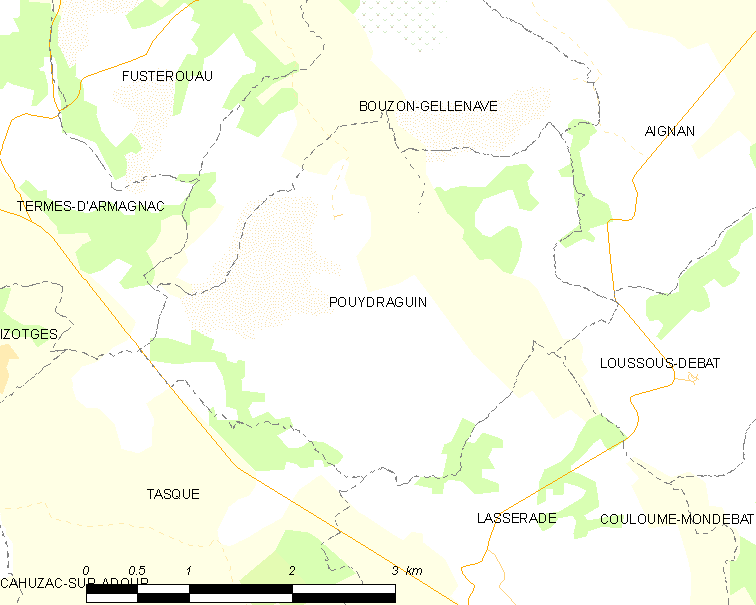
Pouydraguin and its surrounding communes

== Population ==
Historical population
| Year | Pop. | ±% p.a. |
|---|---|---|
| 1968 | 162 | — |
| 1975 | 138 | −2.26% |
| 1982 | 137 | −0.10% |
| 1990 | 137 | +0.00% |
| 1999 | 136 | −0.08% |
| 2007 | 143 | +0.63% |
| 2012 | 150 | +0.96% |
| 2017 | 131 | −2.67% |
| 2023 | 120 | −1.45% |
Source: INSEE

== See also ==
- Communes of the Gers department
