= Avéron-Bergelle =

- Commune
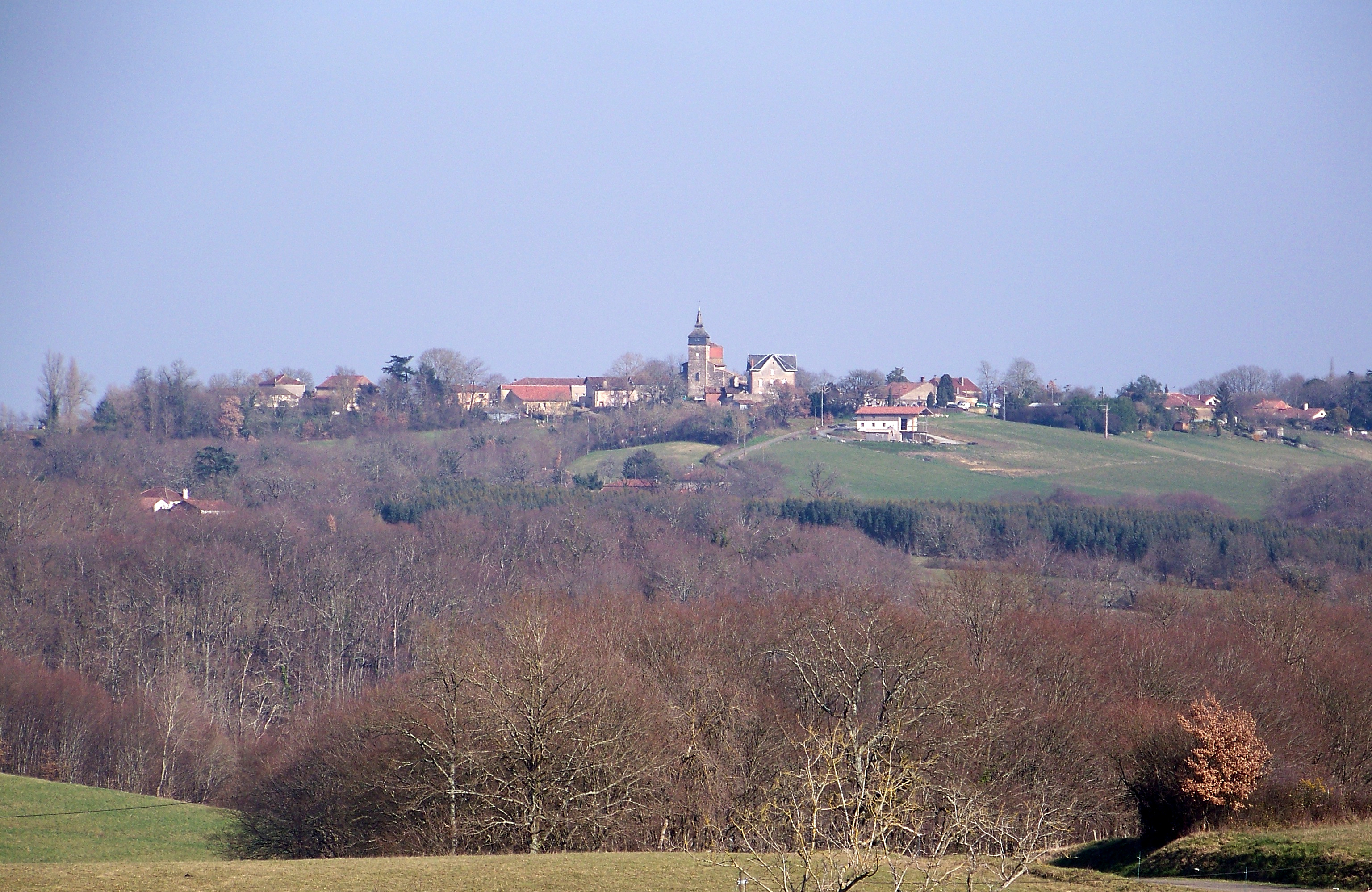
- A general view of Avéron-Bergelle
- Location of Avéron-Bergelle
- Location within France Location within Occitanie
- Coordinates: 43°44′44″N 0°04′14″E
- Country: France
- Region: Occitania
- Department: Gers
- Arrondissement: Mirande
- Canton: Adour-Gersoise
- Intercommunality: CC Armagnac Adour

Government
  - Mayor (2020–2026): Michel Lartigolle
- Area^{1}: 14.7 km^{2} (5.7 sq mi)
- Elevation: 160 m (520 ft)
- Highest elevation: 196 m (643 ft)
- Lowest elevation: 109 m (358 ft)
- Population (2023): 186
  - Density: 12.7/km^{2} (32.8/sq mi)
- Time zone: UTC+01:00 (CET)
  - Summer (DST): UTC+02:00 (CEST)
- INSEE/Postal code: 32022 /32290
- ^{1} French Land Register data, which excludes lakes, ponds, glaciers > 1 km^{2} (0.386 sq mi or 247 acres) and river estuaries.

Avéron-Bergelle (French pronunciation: [aveʁɔ̃ bɛʁʒɛl]; Occitan: Averon e Bergela) is a commune in the Gers department in southwestern France.

== Geography ==
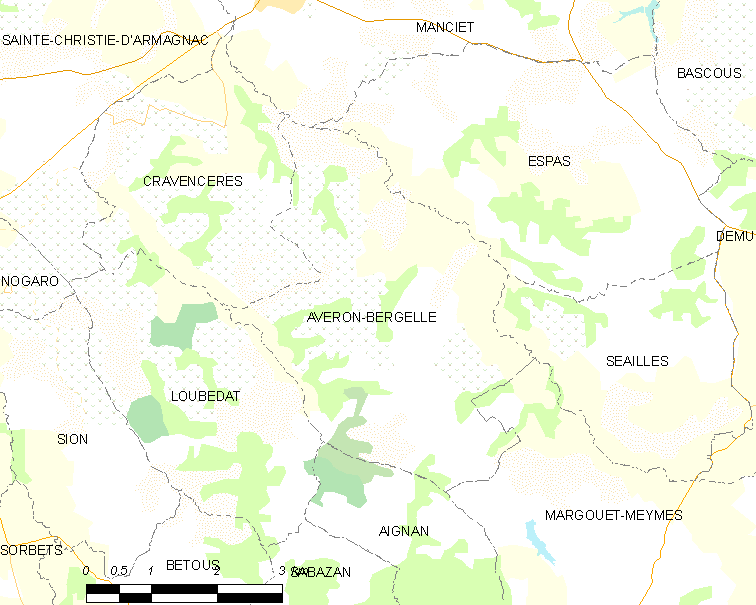
Avéron-Bergelle and its surrounding communes

== Population ==
Historical population
Year	Pop.	±% p.a.
1968	277	—
1975	233	−2.44%
1982	193	−2.65%
1990	174	−1.29%
1999	176	+0.13%
2007	165	−0.80%
2012	149	−2.02%
2017	143	−0.82%
2023	186	+4.48%
Source: INSEE

== See also ==
- Communes of the Gers department
