= Corneillan =

- Commune
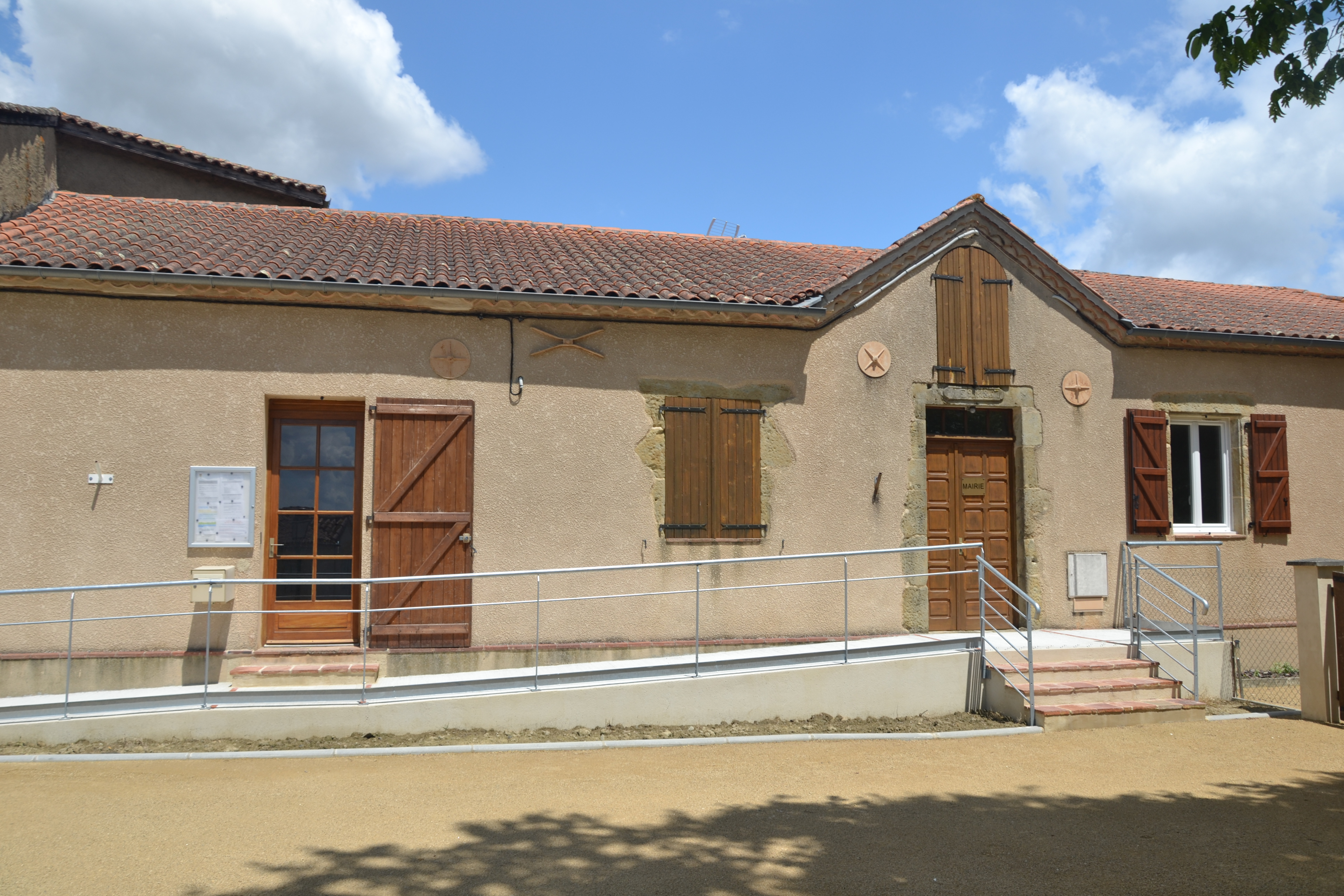
- The town hall in Corneillan

- Coat of arms
- Location of Corneillan
- Location within France Location within Occitanie
- Coordinates: 43°39′26″N 0°10′44″W
- Country: France
- Region: Occitania
- Department: Gers
- Arrondissement: Mirande
- Canton: Adour-Gersoise
- Intercommunality: Aire-sur-l'Adour

Government
  - Mayor (2020–2026): Pascal Carreau
- Area^{1}: 8.47 km^{2} (3.27 sq mi)
- Elevation: 152 m (499 ft)
- Highest elevation: 160 m (520 ft)
- Lowest elevation: 85 m (279 ft)
- Population (2023): 155
  - Density: 18.3/km^{2} (47.4/sq mi)
- Time zone: UTC+01:00 (CET)
  - Summer (DST): UTC+02:00 (CEST)
- INSEE/Postal code: 32108 /32400
- ^{1} French Land Register data, which excludes lakes, ponds, glaciers > 1 km^{2} (0.386 sq mi or 247 acres) and river estuaries.

Corneillan (French pronunciation: [kɔʁnɛjɑ̃]; Occitan: Cornelhan) is a commune in the Gers department in southwestern France.

== Geography ==
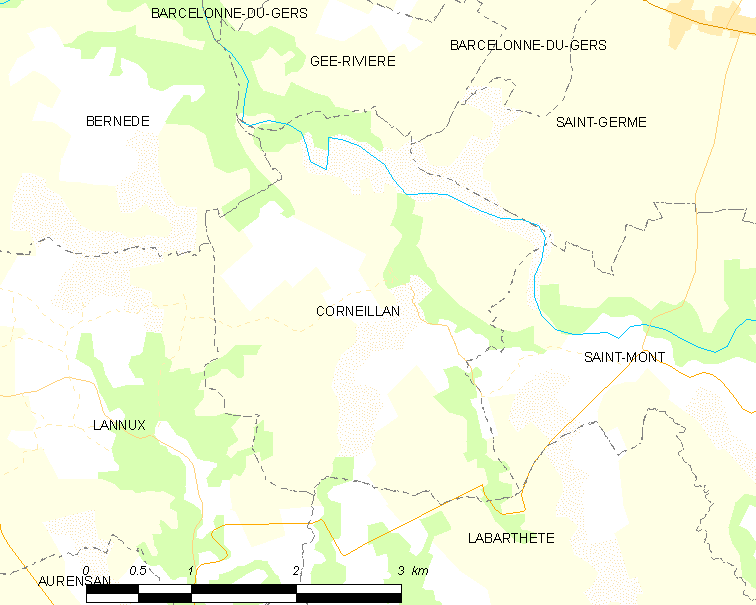
Corneillan and its surrounding communes

== Population ==
Historical population
| Year | Pop. | ±% p.a. |
|---|---|---|
| 1968 | 140 | — |
| 1975 | 121 | −2.06% |
| 1982 | 114 | −0.85% |
| 1990 | 115 | +0.11% |
| 1999 | 147 | +2.77% |
| 2007 | 140 | −0.61% |
| 2012 | 136 | −0.58% |
| 2017 | 146 | +1.43% |
| 2023 | 155 | +1.00% |
Source: INSEE

== See also ==
- Communes of the Gers department
