= Sarragachies =

- Commune
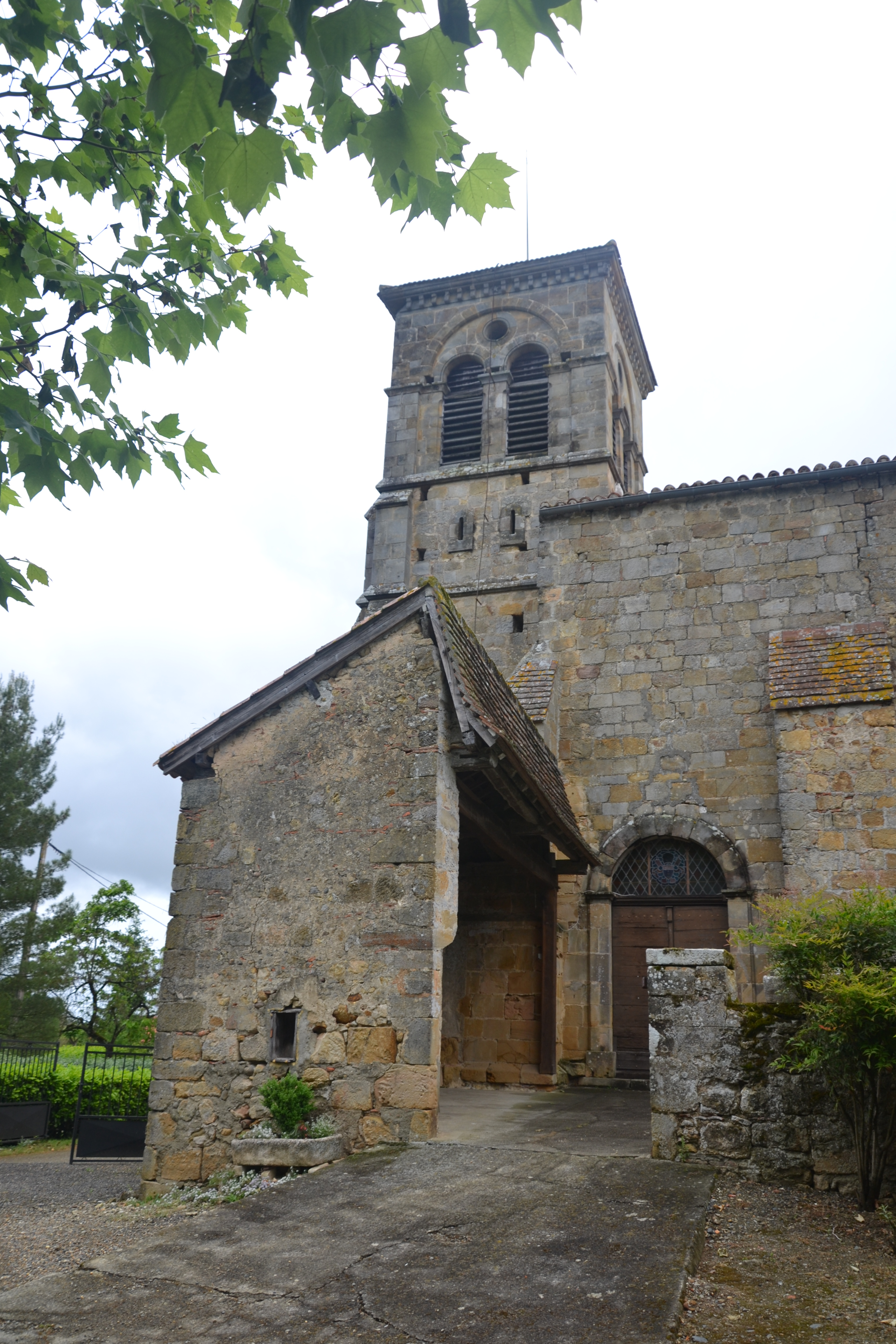
- The church
- Location of Sarragachies
- Location within France Location within Occitanie
- Coordinates: 43°41′02″N 0°03′10″W
- Country: France
- Region: Occitania
- Department: Gers
- Arrondissement: Mirande
- Canton: Adour-Gersoise

Government
  - Mayor (2020–2026): Laurent Perisse
- Area^{1}: 12.83 km^{2} (4.95 sq mi)
- Elevation: 155 m (509 ft)
- Highest elevation: 177 m (581 ft)
- Lowest elevation: 106 m (348 ft)
- Population (2023): 217
  - Density: 16.9/km^{2} (43.8/sq mi)
- Time zone: UTC+01:00 (CET)
  - Summer (DST): UTC+02:00 (CEST)
- INSEE/Postal code: 32414 /32400
- ^{1} French Land Register data, which excludes lakes, ponds, glaciers > 1 km^{2} (0.386 sq mi or 247 acres) and river estuaries.

Sarragachies (French pronunciation: [saʁaɡaʃi]; Occitan: Sarragaishias) is a commune in the Gers department in southwestern France.

== Geography ==
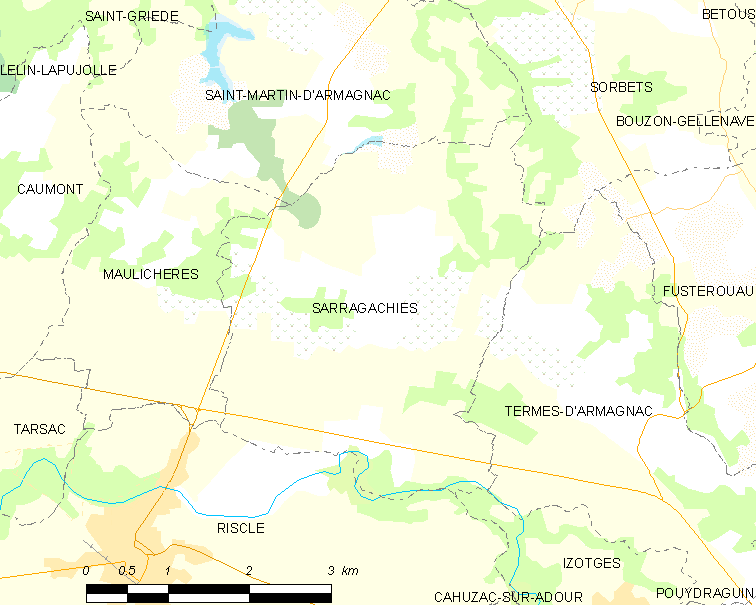
Sarragachies and its surrounding communes

== Population ==
Historical population
Year	Pop.	±% p.a.
1968	312	—
1975	319	+0.32%
1982	296	−1.06%
1990	271	−1.10%
1999	265	−0.25%
2007	257	−0.38%
2012	260	+0.23%
2017	237	−1.84%
2023	217	−1.46%
Source: INSEE

== See also ==
- Communes of the Gers department
