= Verlus =

- Commune
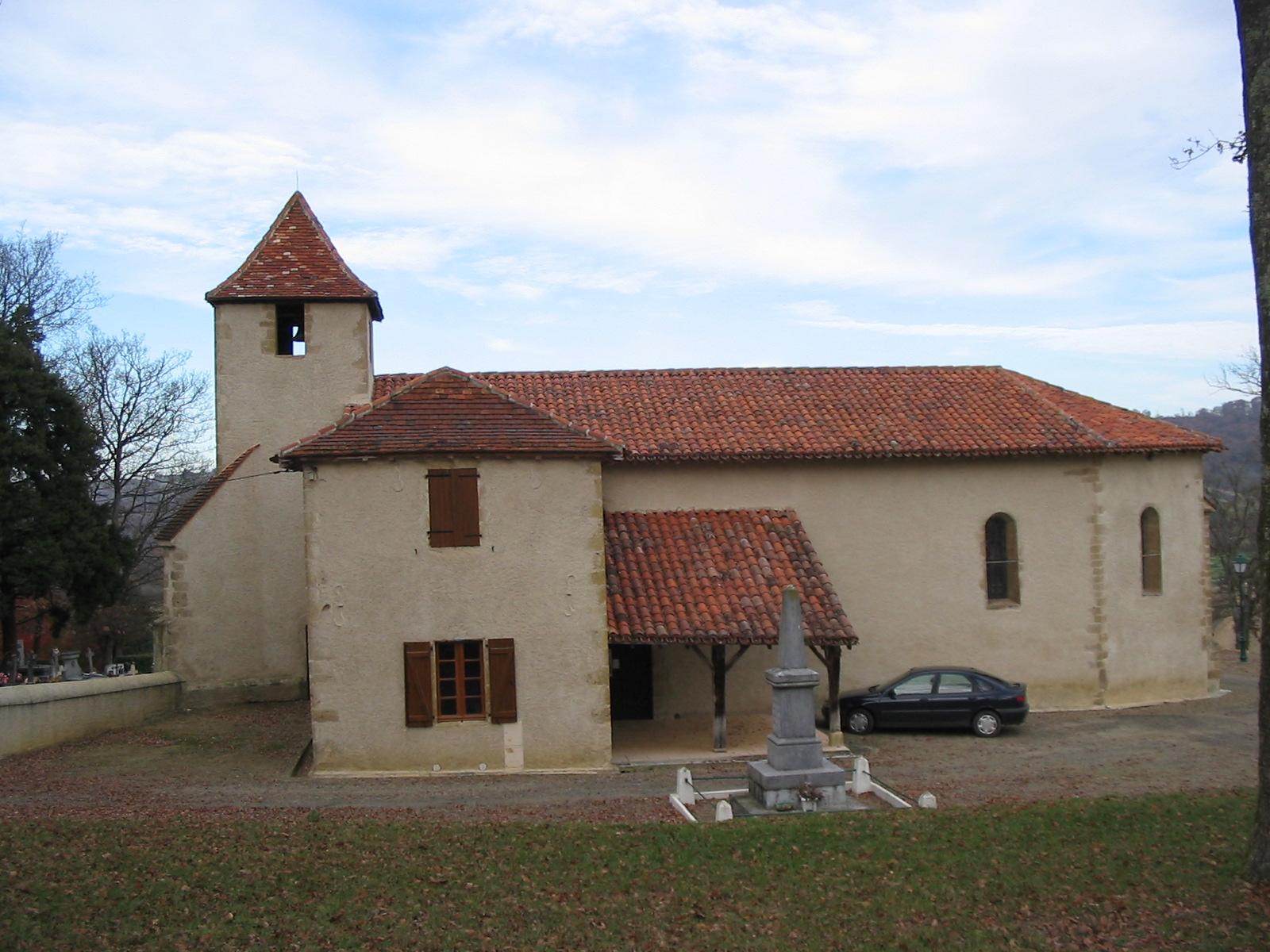
- The church in Verlus
- Location of Verlus
- Location within France Location within Occitanie
- Coordinates: 43°36′11″N 0°11′43″W
- Country: France
- Region: Occitania
- Department: Gers
- Arrondissement: Mirande
- Canton: Adour-Gersoise

Government
  - Mayor (2020–2026): Jean Menvielle
- Area^{1}: 6.19 km^{2} (2.39 sq mi)
- Elevation: 210 m (690 ft)
- Highest elevation: 236 m (774 ft)
- Lowest elevation: 98 m (322 ft)
- Population (2023): 124
  - Density: 20.0/km^{2} (51.9/sq mi)
- Time zone: UTC+01:00 (CET)
  - Summer (DST): UTC+02:00 (CEST)
- INSEE/Postal code: 32461 /32400
- ^{1} French Land Register data, which excludes lakes, ponds, glaciers > 1 km^{2} (0.386 sq mi or 247 acres) and river estuaries.

Verlus is a commune in the Gers department in southwestern France.

== Geography ==
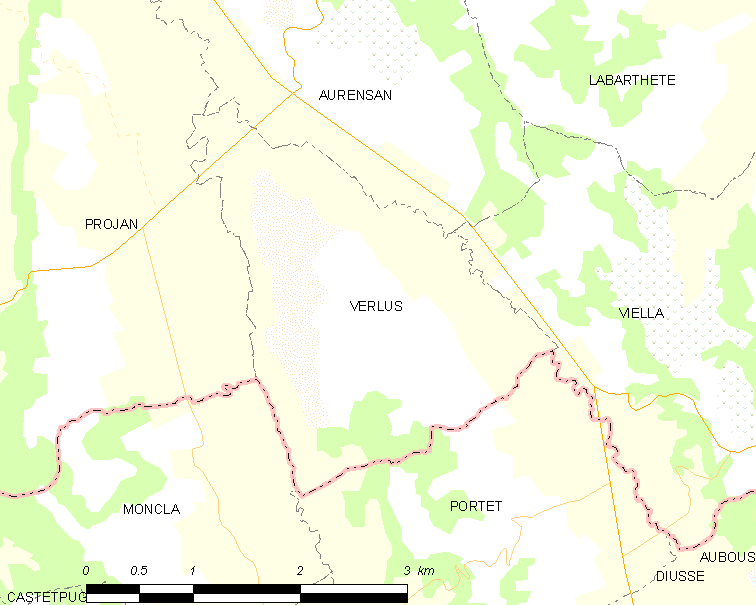
Verlus and its surrounding communes

== Population ==
Historical population
Year	Pop.	±% p.a.
1968	103	—
1975	80	−3.55%
1982	75	−0.92%
1990	90	+2.31%
1999	97	+0.84%
2007	96	−0.13%
2012	91	−1.06%
2017	105	+2.90%
2023	124	+2.81%
Source: INSEE

== See also ==
- Communes of the Gers department
