= Maumusson-Laguian =

- Commune
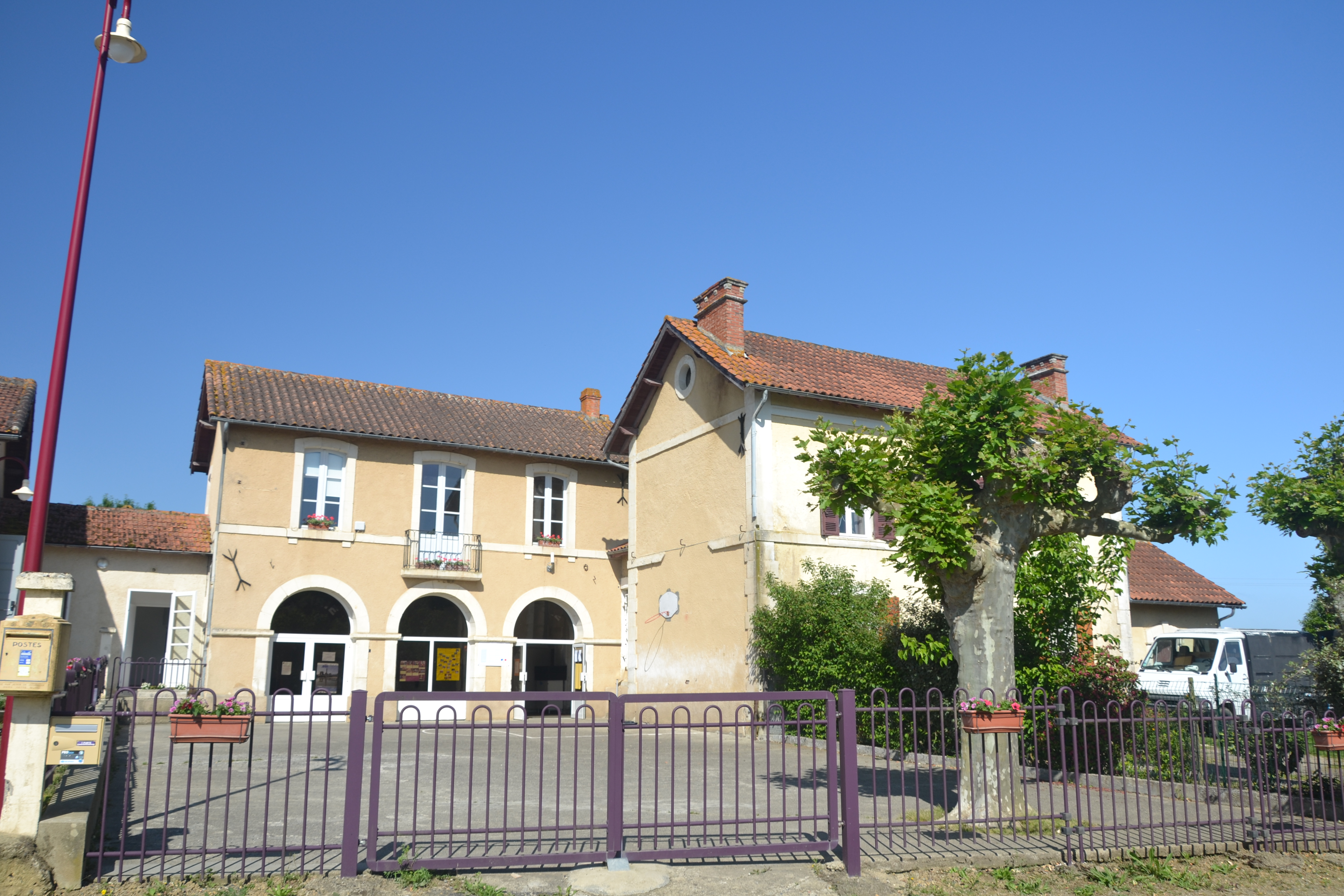
- The town hall in Maumusson-Laguian
- Location of Maumusson-Laguian
- Location within France Location within Occitanie
- Coordinates: 43°36′31″N 0°05′51″W
- Country: France
- Region: Occitania
- Department: Gers
- Arrondissement: Mirande
- Canton: Adour-Gersoise

Government
  - Mayor (2020–2026): Guy Capmartin
- Area^{1}: 9.30 km^{2} (3.59 sq mi)
- Elevation: 145 m (476 ft)
- Highest elevation: 184 m (604 ft)
- Lowest elevation: 112 m (367 ft)
- Population (2023): 139
  - Density: 14.9/km^{2} (38.7/sq mi)
- Time zone: UTC+01:00 (CET)
  - Summer (DST): UTC+02:00 (CEST)
- INSEE/Postal code: 32245 /32400
- ^{1} French Land Register data, which excludes lakes, ponds, glaciers > 1 km^{2} (0.386 sq mi or 247 acres) and river estuaries.

Maumusson-Laguian (French pronunciation: [momysɔ̃ laɡjɑ̃]; Occitan: Maumusson e Laguian) is a commune in the Gers department in southwestern France.

== Geography ==
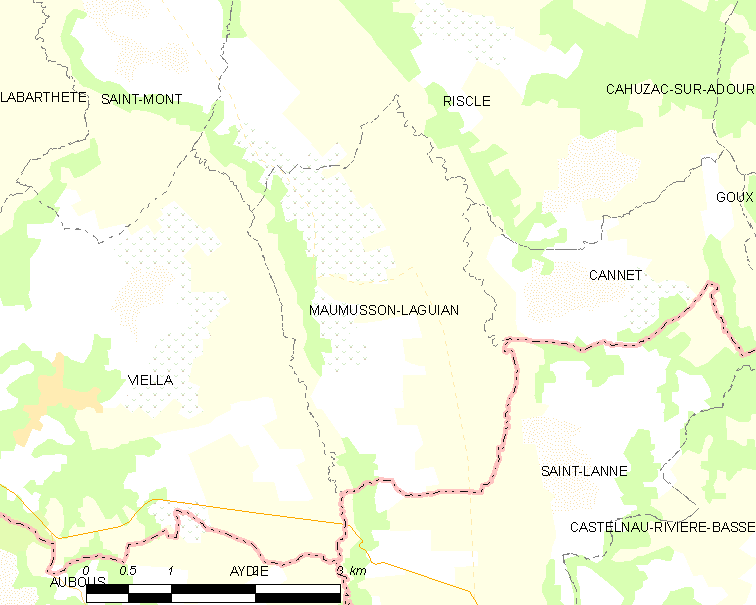
Maumusson-Lagui and its surrounding communes

== Population ==
Historical population
Year	Pop.	±% p.a.
1968	202	—
1975	182	−1.48%
1982	174	−0.64%
1990	163	−0.81%
1999	165	+0.14%
2007	156	−0.70%
2012	148	−1.05%
2017	145	−0.41%
2023	139	−0.70%
Source: INSEE

== See also ==
- Communes of the Gers department
