= Sabazan =

- Commune
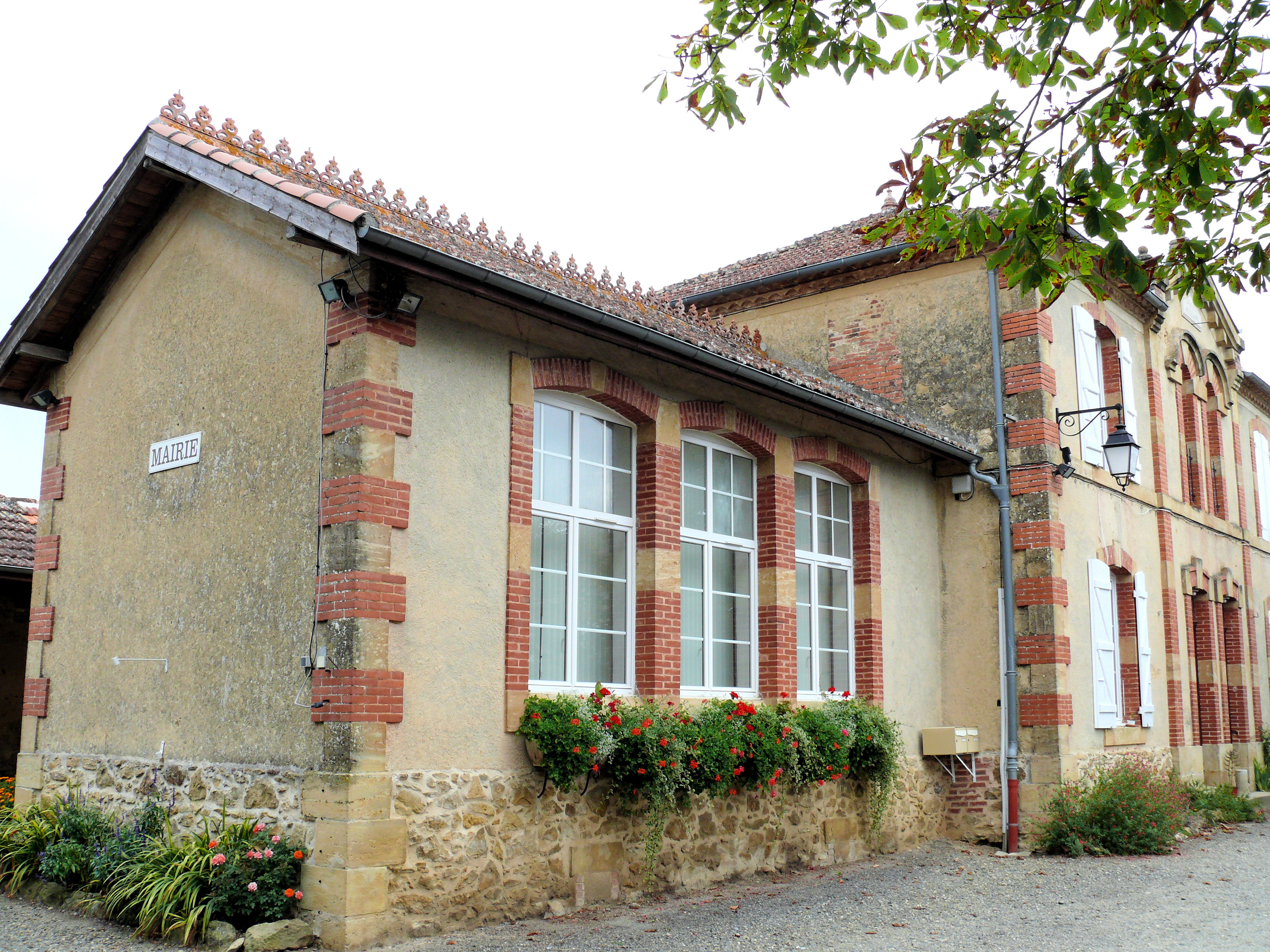
- The town hall in Sabazan
- Location of Sabazan
- Location within France Location within Occitanie
- Coordinates: 43°42′21″N 0°02′53″E
- Country: France
- Region: Occitania
- Department: Gers
- Arrondissement: Mirande
- Canton: Adour-Gersoise
- Intercommunality: Armagnac Adour

Government
  - Mayor (2020–2026): Corinne Pailhas
- Area^{1}: 8.26 km^{2} (3.19 sq mi)
- Elevation: 160 m (520 ft)
- Highest elevation: 210 m (690 ft)
- Lowest elevation: 102 m (335 ft)
- Population (2023): 126
  - Density: 15.3/km^{2} (39.5/sq mi)
- Time zone: UTC+01:00 (CET)
  - Summer (DST): UTC+02:00 (CEST)
- INSEE/Postal code: 32354 /32290
- ^{1} French Land Register data, which excludes lakes, ponds, glaciers > 1 km^{2} (0.386 sq mi or 247 acres) and river estuaries.

Sabazan (French pronunciation: [sabazɑ̃]; Occitan: Sabasan) is a commune in the Gers department, Occitania, southwestern France.

== Geography ==
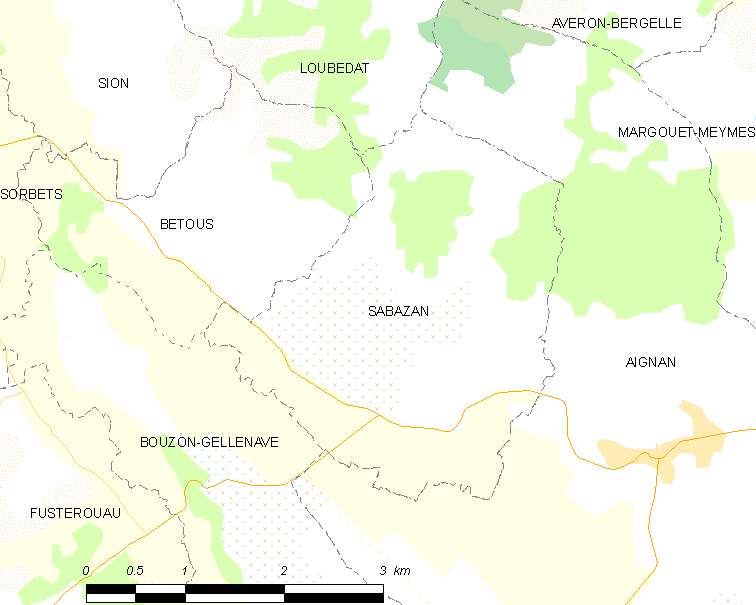
Sabazan and its surrounding communes

== Population ==
Historical population
Year	Pop.	±% p.a.
1968	147	—
1975	131	−1.63%
1982	142	+1.16%
1990	151	+0.77%
1999	135	−1.24%
2007	140	+0.46%
2012	130	−1.47%
2017	136	+0.91%
2023	126	−1.26%
Source: INSEE

== See also ==
- Communes of the Gers department
