= Goux, Gers =

Goux
- Commune
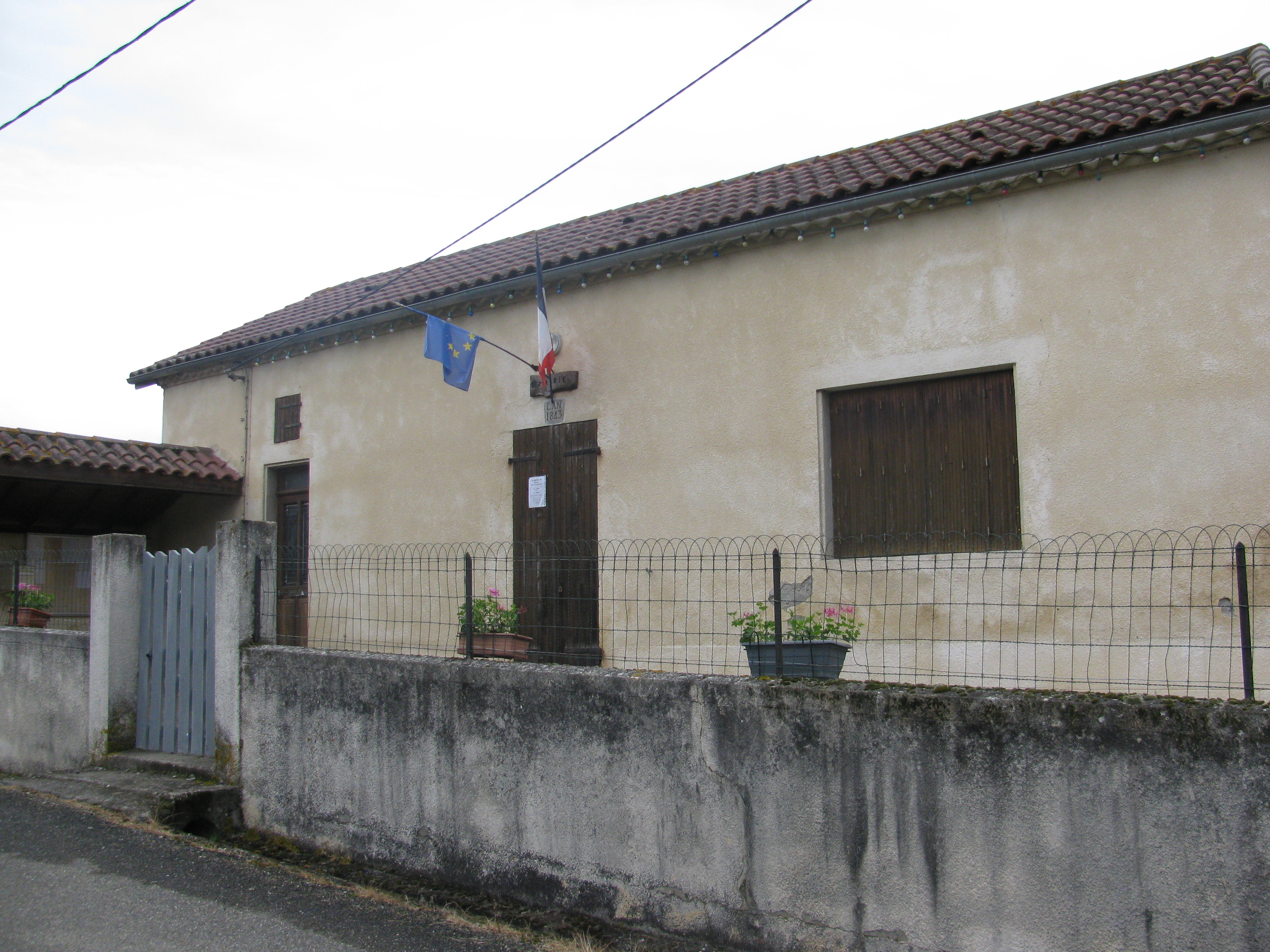
- The town hall in Goux
- Location of Goux
- Location within France Location within Occitanie
- Coordinates: 43°37′07″N 0°01′15″W
- Country: France
- Region: Occitania
- Department: Gers
- Arrondissement: Mirande
- Canton: Adour-Gersoise

Government
  - Mayor (2020–2026): Robert Cagnasso
- Area^{1}: 5.36 km^{2} (2.07 sq mi)
- Elevation: 135 m (443 ft)
- Highest elevation: 226 m (741 ft)
- Lowest elevation: 122 m (400 ft)
- Population (2023): 65
  - Density: 12/km^{2} (31/sq mi)
- Time zone: UTC+01:00 (CET)
  - Summer (DST): UTC+02:00 (CEST)
- INSEE/Postal code: 32151 /32400
- ^{1} French Land Register data, which excludes lakes, ponds, glaciers > 1 km^{2} (0.386 sq mi or 247 acres) and river estuaries.

Goux is a commune in the Gers department in southwestern France.

Area: approximately 5.36 km^{2}.

Elevation: ranges between 122 and 226 meters above sea level.

== Geography ==
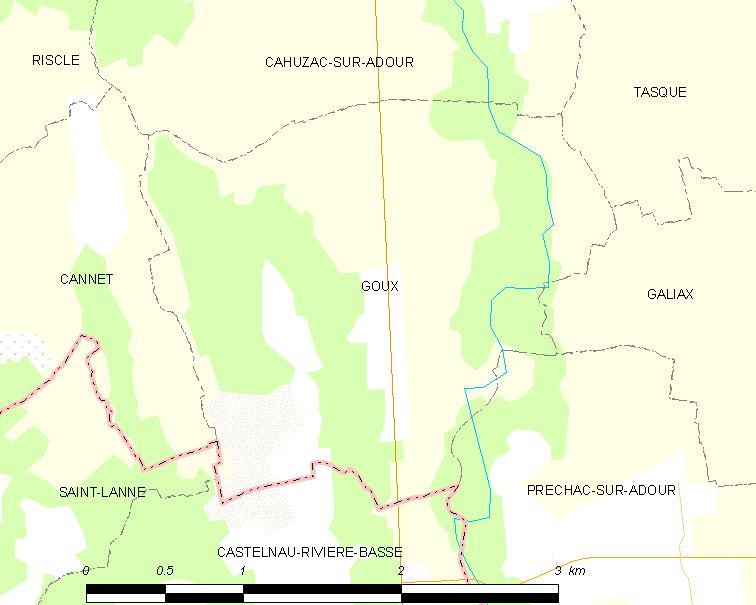
Goux and its surrounding communes

== Population ==
Historical population
Year	Pop.	±% p.a.
1968	102	—
1975	76	−4.12%
1982	69	−1.37%
1990	62	−1.33%
1999	84	+3.43%
2007	85	+0.15%
2012	77	−1.96%
2017	67	−2.74%
2023	65	−0.50%
Source: INSEE

== See also ==
- Communes of the Gers department
