= Caumont, Gers =

Caumont
- Commune
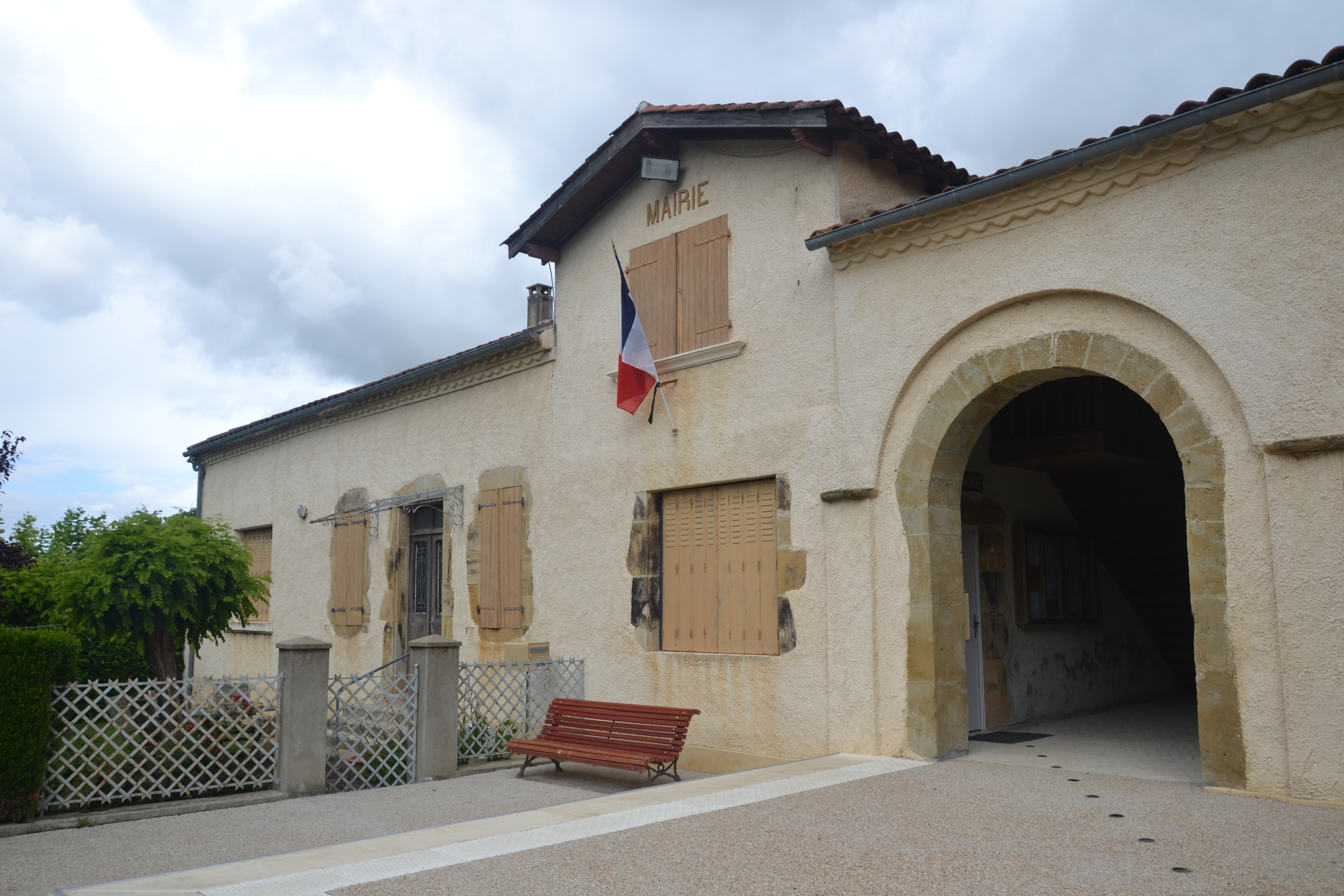
- The town hall in Caumont
- Location of Caumont
- Location within France Location within Occitanie
- Coordinates: 43°41′32″N 0°06′11″W
- Country: France
- Region: Occitania
- Department: Gers
- Arrondissement: Mirande
- Canton: Adour-Gersoise

Government
  - Mayor (2020–2026): Jean-Claude Franchetto
- Area^{1}: 7.15 km^{2} (2.76 sq mi)
- Elevation: 181 m (594 ft)
- Highest elevation: 193 m (633 ft)
- Lowest elevation: 98 m (322 ft)
- Population (2023): 103
  - Density: 14.4/km^{2} (37.3/sq mi)
- Time zone: UTC+01:00 (CET)
  - Summer (DST): UTC+02:00 (CEST)
- INSEE/Postal code: 32093 /32400
- ^{1} French Land Register data, which excludes lakes, ponds, glaciers > 1 km^{2} (0.386 sq mi or 247 acres) and river estuaries.

Caumont (French pronunciation: [komɔ̃]) is a commune in the Gers department in southwestern France.

== Geography ==
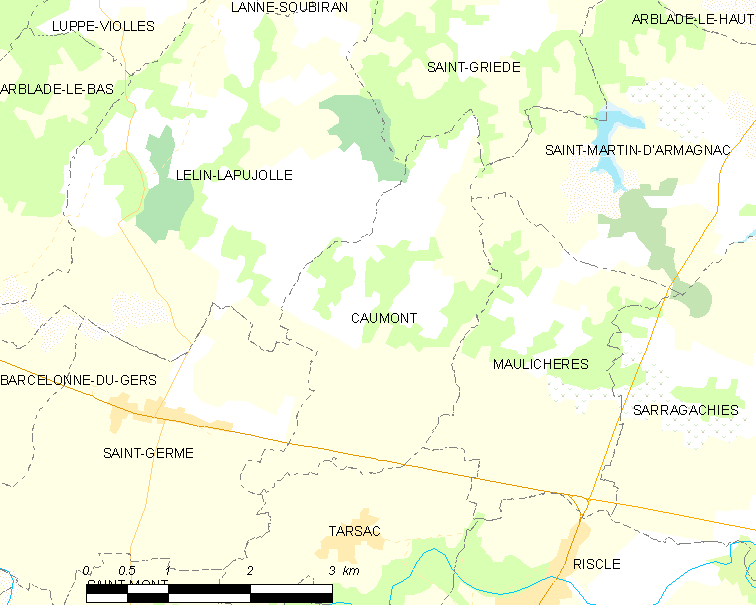
Caumont and its surrounding communes

== Population ==
Historical population
| Year | Pop. | ±% p.a. |
|---|---|---|
| 1968 | 128 | — |
| 1975 | 98 | −3.74% |
| 1982 | 108 | +1.40% |
| 1990 | 102 | −0.71% |
| 1999 | 103 | +0.11% |
| 2007 | 125 | +2.45% |
| 2012 | 118 | −1.15% |
| 2017 | 102 | −2.87% |
| 2023 | 103 | +0.16% |
Source: INSEE

== See also ==
- Communes of the Gers department
