= Bernède =

- Commune
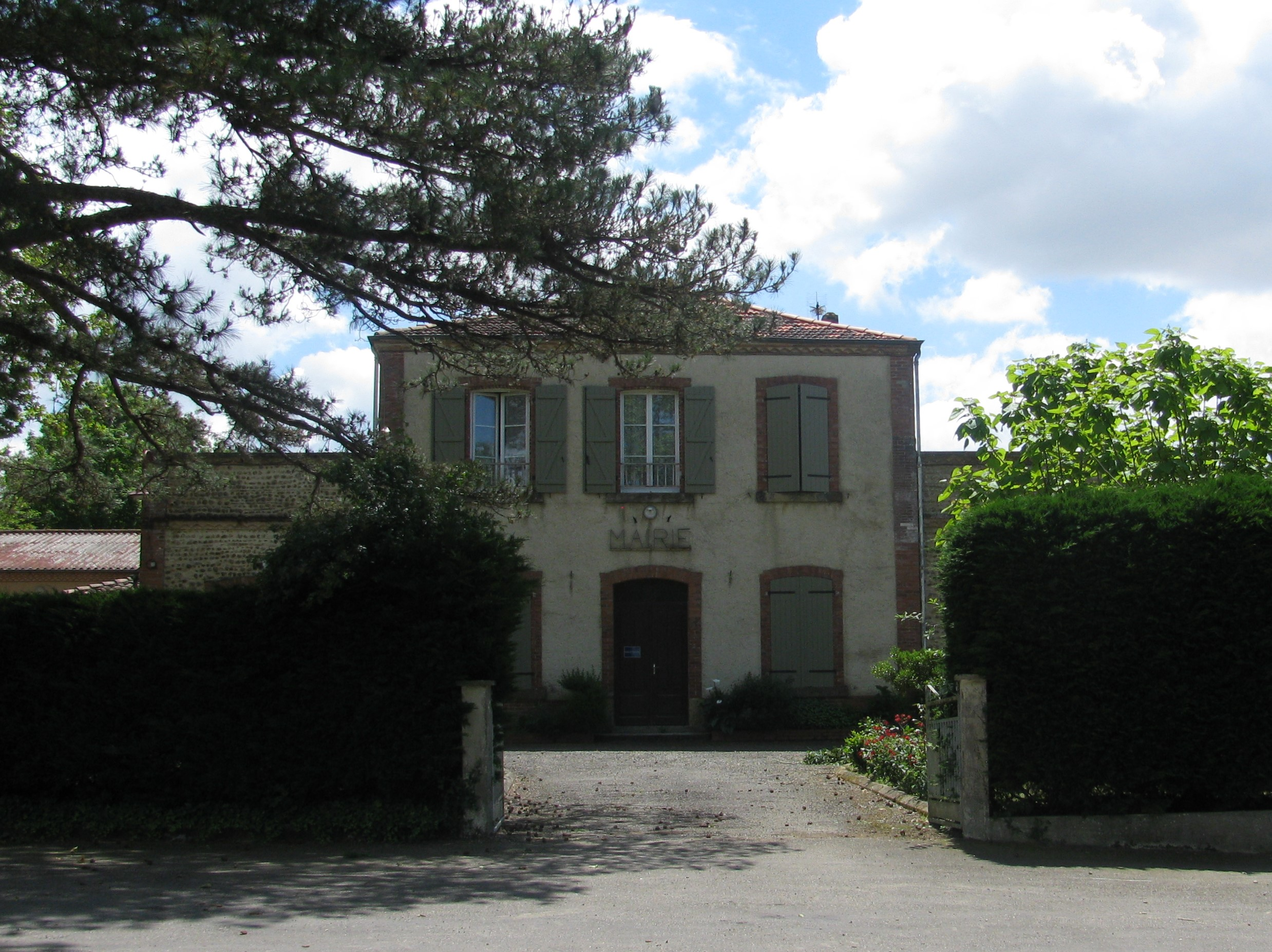
- The town hall in Bernède

- Coat of arms
- Location of Bernède
- Location within France Location within Occitanie
- Coordinates: 43°40′14″N 0°13′14″W
- Country: France
- Region: Occitania
- Department: Gers
- Arrondissement: Mirande
- Canton: Adour-Gersoise
- Intercommunality: Aire-sur-l'Adour

Government
  - Mayor (2020–2026): Daniel Saint-Genez
- Area^{1}: 8.18 km^{2} (3.16 sq mi)
- Elevation: 60 m (200 ft)
- Highest elevation: 168 m (551 ft)
- Lowest elevation: 80 m (260 ft)
- Population (2023): 182
  - Density: 22.2/km^{2} (57.6/sq mi)
- Time zone: UTC+01:00 (CET)
  - Summer (DST): UTC+02:00 (CEST)
- INSEE/Postal code: 32046 /32400
- ^{1} French Land Register data, which excludes lakes, ponds, glaciers > 1 km^{2} (0.386 sq mi or 247 acres) and river estuaries.

Bernède (French pronunciation: [bɛʁnɛd]; Occitan: Verneda) is a commune in the Gers department in southwestern France.

== Geography ==
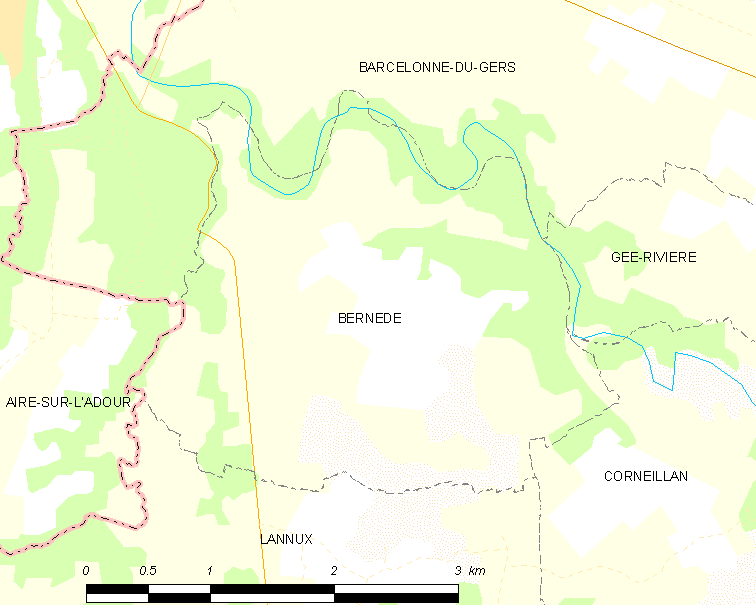
Bernède and its surrounding communes

== Population ==
Historical population
Year	Pop.	±% p.a.
1968	250	—
1975	217	−2.00%
1982	209	−0.54%
1990	197	−0.74%
1999	204	+0.39%
2007	216	+0.72%
2012	214	−0.19%
2017	204	−0.95%
2023	182	−1.88%
Source: INSEE

== See also ==
- Communes of the Gers department
