= Gée-Rivière =

- Commune
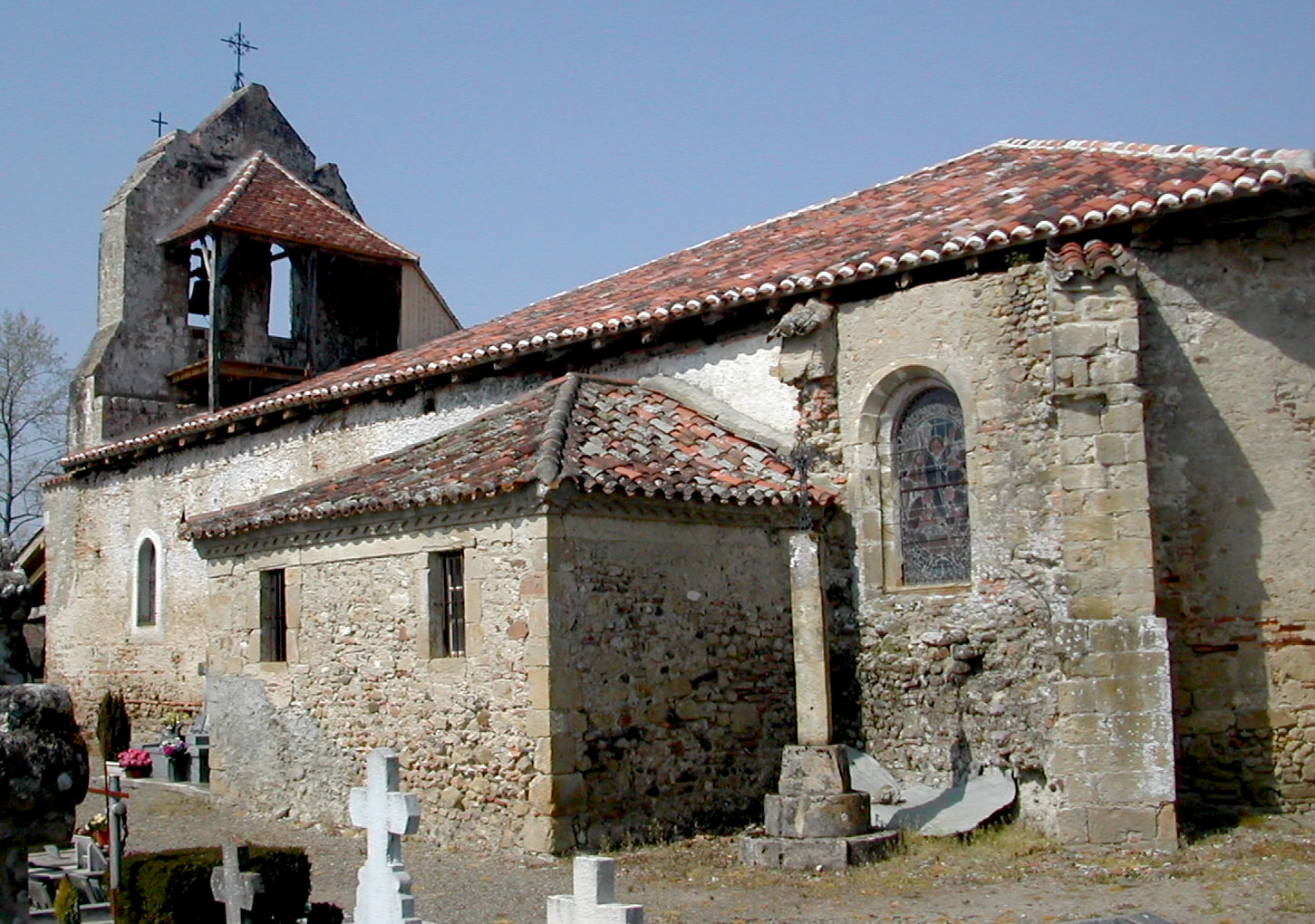
- The church in Gée-Rivière
- Location of Gée-Rivière
- Location within France Location within Occitanie
- Coordinates: 43°40′26″N 0°10′52″W
- Country: France
- Region: Occitania
- Department: Gers
- Arrondissement: Mirande
- Canton: Adour-Gersoise
- Intercommunality: Aire-sur-l'Adour

Government
  - Mayor (2020–2026): Pascal Bacquié
- Area^{1}: 2.74 km^{2} (1.06 sq mi)
- Elevation: 200 m (660 ft)
- Highest elevation: 92 m (302 ft)
- Lowest elevation: 83 m (272 ft)
- Population (2023): 45
  - Density: 16/km^{2} (43/sq mi)
- Time zone: UTC+01:00 (CET)
  - Summer (DST): UTC+02:00 (CEST)
- INSEE/Postal code: 32145 /32720
- ^{1} French Land Register data, which excludes lakes, ponds, glaciers > 1 km^{2} (0.386 sq mi or 247 acres) and river estuaries.

Gée-Rivière (French pronunciation: [ʒe ʁivjɛʁ]; Occitan: Gea e Ribèra) is a commune in the Gers department in southwestern France.

== Geography ==
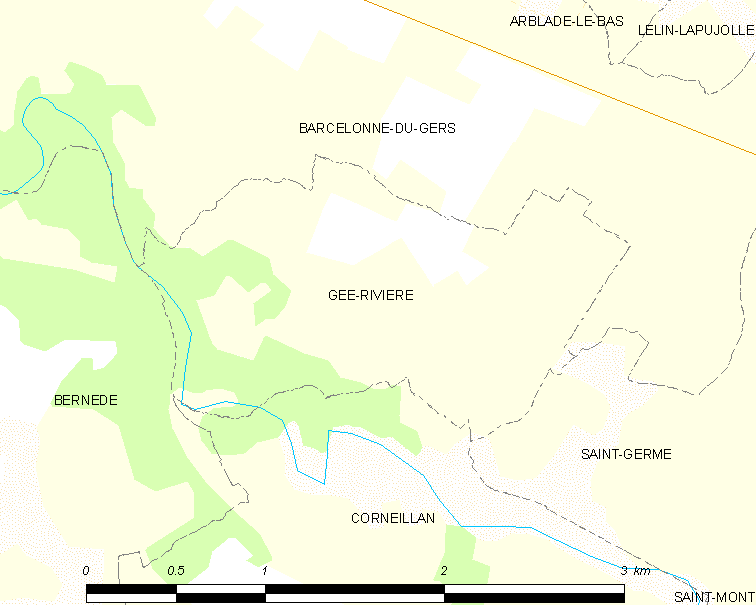
Gée-Rivière and its surrounding communes

== Population ==
Historical population
Year	Pop.	±% p.a.
1968	44	—
1975	38	−2.07%
1982	39	+0.37%
1990	51	+3.41%
1999	51	+0.00%
2007	46	−1.28%
2012	49	+1.27%
2017	46	−1.26%
2023	45	−0.37%
Source: INSEE

== See also ==
- Communes of the Gers department
