= Vergoignan =

- Commune
- Coat of arms
- Location of Vergoignan
- Location within France Location within Occitanie
- Coordinates: 43°43′07″N 0°11′50″W
- Country: France
- Region: Occitania
- Department: Gers
- Arrondissement: Mirande
- Canton: Adour-Gersoise
- Intercommunality: Aire-sur-l'Adour

Government
  - Mayor (2020–2026): Michel Marque
- Area^{1}: 10.44 km^{2} (4.03 sq mi)
- Elevation: 140 m (460 ft)
- Highest elevation: 153 m (502 ft)
- Lowest elevation: 91 m (299 ft)
- Population (2023): 324
  - Density: 31.0/km^{2} (80.4/sq mi)
- Time zone: UTC+01:00 (CET)
  - Summer (DST): UTC+02:00 (CEST)
- INSEE/Postal code: 32460 /32720
- ^{1} French Land Register data, which excludes lakes, ponds, glaciers > 1 km^{2} (0.386 sq mi or 247 acres) and river estuaries.

Vergoignan (French pronunciation: [vɛʁɡwaɲɑ̃]; Occitan: Vergonhan) is a commune in the Gers department in southwestern France.

== Geography ==
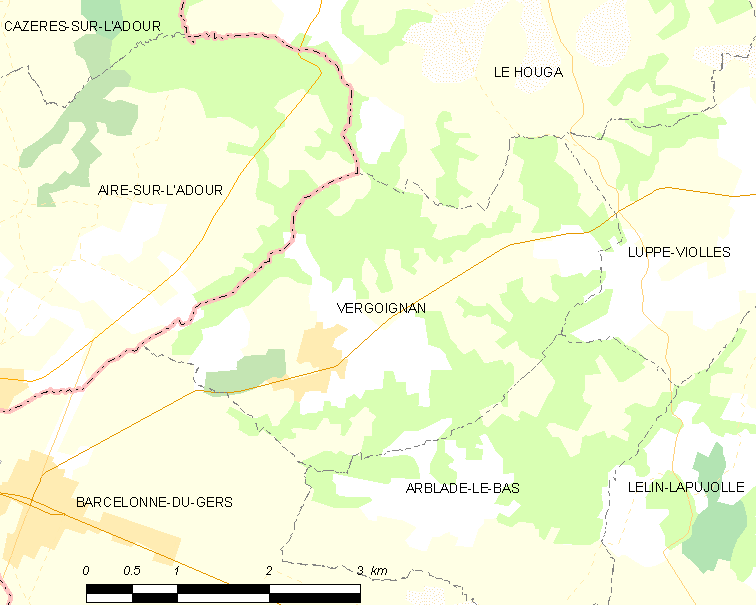
Vergoignan and its surrounding communes

== Population ==
Historical population
Year	Pop.	±% p.a.
1968	188	—
1975	192	+0.30%
1982	202	+0.73%
1990	243	+2.34%
1999	251	+0.36%
2007	276	+1.19%
2012	294	+1.27%
2017	299	+0.34%
2023	324	+1.35%
Source: INSEE

== See also ==
- Communes of the Gers department
