= Lelin-Lapujolle =

- Commune
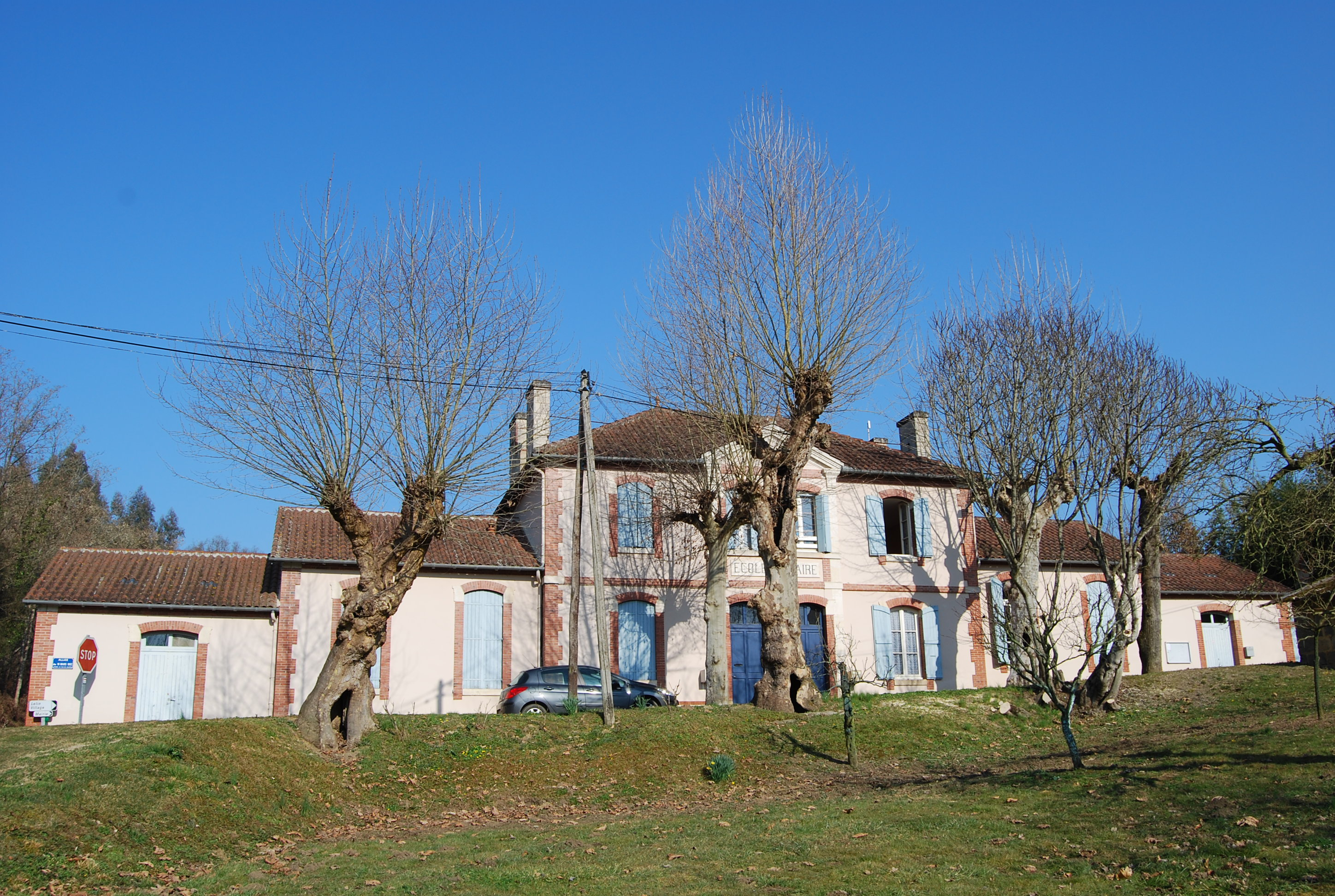
- The town hall in Lelin-Lapujolle
- Location of Lelin-Lapujolle
- Location within France Location within Occitanie
- Coordinates: 43°42′27″N 0°08′43″W
- Country: France
- Region: Occitania
- Department: Gers
- Arrondissement: Mirande
- Canton: Adour-Gersoise

Government
  - Mayor (2020–2026): Marc Ducournau
- Area^{1}: 13.56 km^{2} (5.24 sq mi)
- Elevation: 133 m (436 ft)
- Highest elevation: 188 m (617 ft)
- Lowest elevation: 96 m (315 ft)
- Population (2023): 273
  - Density: 20.1/km^{2} (52.1/sq mi)
- Time zone: UTC+01:00 (CET)
  - Summer (DST): UTC+02:00 (CEST)
- INSEE/Postal code: 32209 /32400
- ^{1} French Land Register data, which excludes lakes, ponds, glaciers > 1 km^{2} (0.386 sq mi or 247 acres) and river estuaries.

Lelin-Lapujolle (French pronunciation: [ləlɛ̃ lapyʒɔl]; Occitan: Lo Lin e La Pujòla) is a commune in the Gers department in southwestern France.

== Geography ==
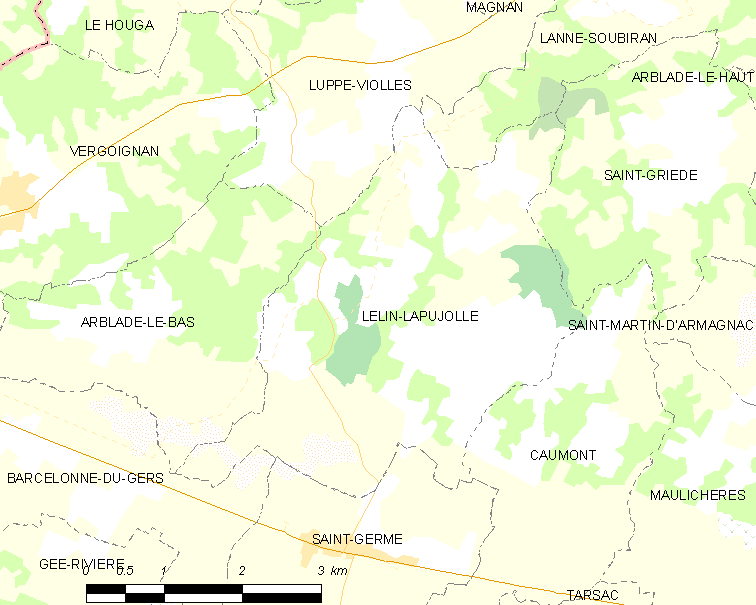
Lelin-Lapujolle and its surrounding communes

== Population ==
Historical population
Year	Pop.	±% p.a.
1968	242	—
1975	222	−1.22%
1982	213	−0.59%
1990	205	−0.48%
1999	207	+0.11%
2007	213	+0.36%
2012	248	+3.09%
2017	278	+2.31%
2023	273	−0.30%
Source: INSEE

== See also ==
- Communes of the Gers department
