= Margouët-Meymes =

- Commune
- Location of Margouët-Meymes
- Location within France Location within Occitanie
- Coordinates: 43°43′33″N 0°06′14″E
- Country: France
- Region: Occitania
- Department: Gers
- Arrondissement: Mirande
- Canton: Adour-Gersoise

Government
  - Mayor (2020–2026): Nadine Justrabo-Hoingne
- Area^{1}: 17.69 km^{2} (6.83 sq mi)
- Elevation: 168 m (551 ft)
- Highest elevation: 221 m (725 ft)
- Lowest elevation: 130 m (430 ft)
- Population (2023): 163
  - Density: 9.21/km^{2} (23.9/sq mi)
- Time zone: UTC+01:00 (CET)
  - Summer (DST): UTC+02:00 (CEST)
- INSEE/Postal code: 32235 /32290
- ^{1} French Land Register data, which excludes lakes, ponds, glaciers > 1 km^{2} (0.386 sq mi or 247 acres) and river estuaries.

Margouët-Meymes is a commune in the Gers department in southwestern France.

== Geography ==
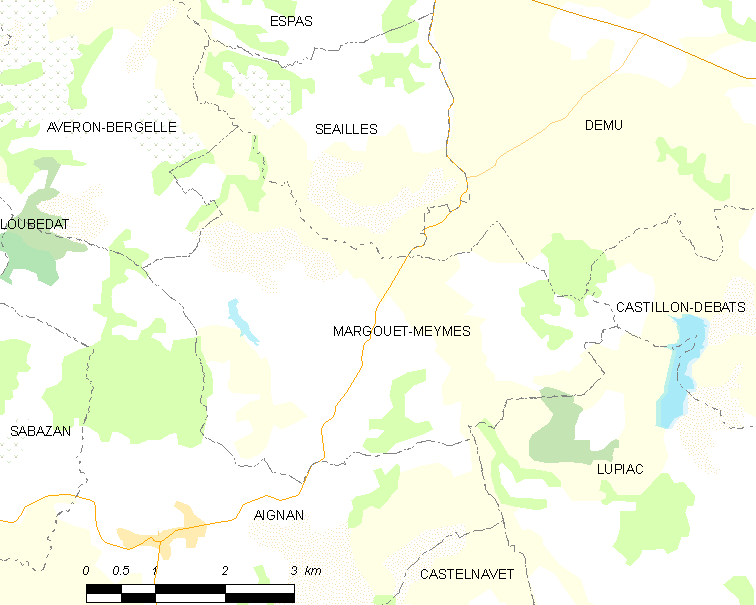
Margouët-Meymes and its surrounding communes

== Population ==
Historical population
Year	Pop.	±% p.a.
1968	302	—
1975	231	−3.76%
1982	207	−1.55%
1990	185	−1.39%
1999	173	−0.74%
2007	195	+1.51%
2012	194	−0.10%
2017	176	−1.93%
2023	163	−1.27%
Source: INSEE

== See also ==
- Communes of the Gers department
