= Juillac =

Juillac may refer to the following communes in France:

- Juillac, Corrèze
- Juillac, Gers
- Juillac, Gironde
- Juillac-le-Coq, in the department of Charente
