= Saint-Christaud =

Saint-Christaud is the name of several communes in France:

- Saint-Christaud, Haute-Garonne in the Haute-Garonne department
- Saint-Christaud, Gers, in the Gers department
