= Pallanne =

- Commune
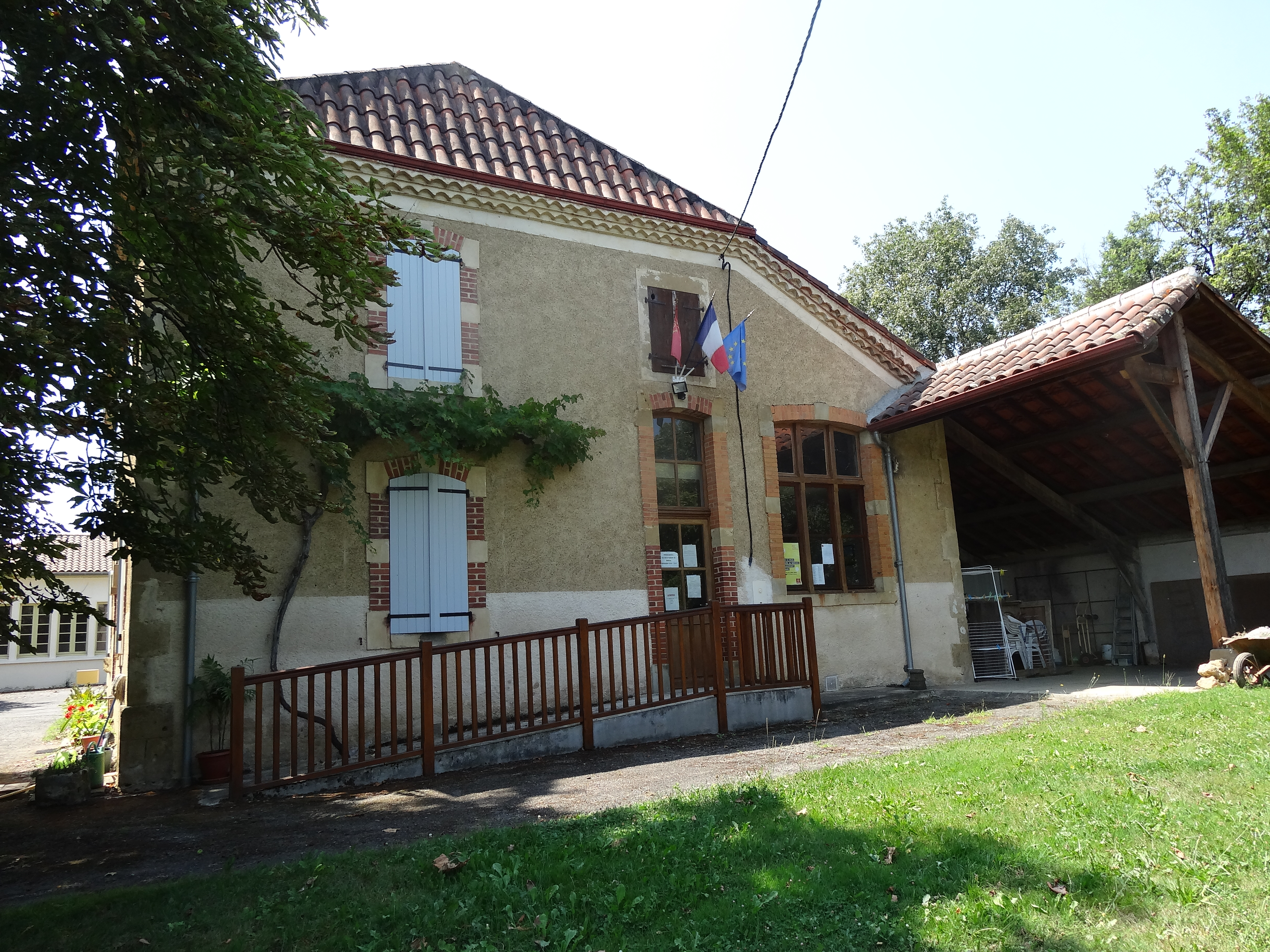
- The town hall in Pallanne
- Location of Pallanne
- Location within France Location within Occitanie
- Coordinates: 43°30′26″N 0°15′03″E
- Country: France
- Region: Occitania
- Department: Gers
- Arrondissement: Mirande
- Canton: Pardiac-Rivière-Basse
- Intercommunality: Bastides et vallons du Gers

Government
  - Mayor (2020–2026): Érich Douillé
- Area^{1}: 5.18 km^{2} (2.00 sq mi)
- Elevation: 50 m (160 ft)
- Highest elevation: 266 m (873 ft)
- Lowest elevation: 165 m (541 ft)
- Population (2023): 61
  - Density: 12/km^{2} (30/sq mi)
- Time zone: UTC+01:00 (CET)
  - Summer (DST): UTC+02:00 (CEST)
- INSEE/Postal code: 32303 /32230
- ^{1} French Land Register data, which excludes lakes, ponds, glaciers > 1 km^{2} (0.386 sq mi or 247 acres) and river estuaries.

Pallanne (French pronunciation: [palan]; Occitan: Patlana) is a commune in the Gers department in southwestern France.

== Geography ==
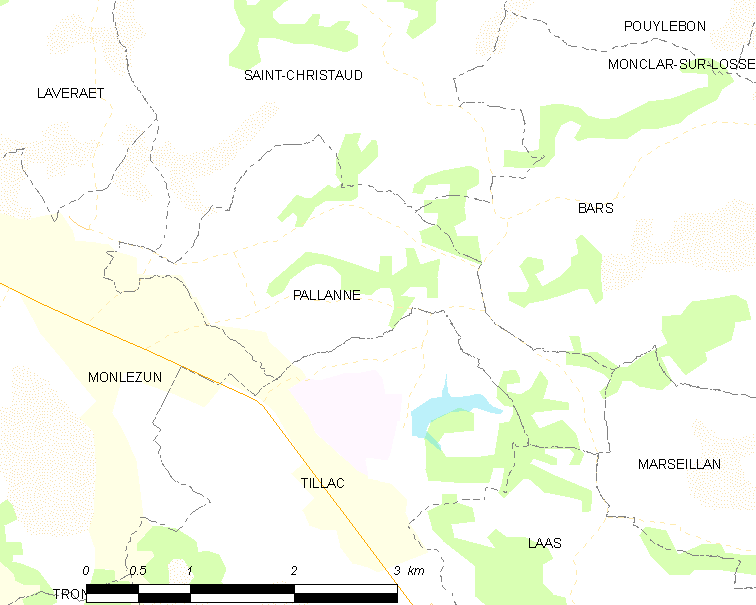
Pallanne and its surrounding communes

== Population ==
Historical population
Year	Pop.	±% p.a.
1968	87	—
1975	64	−4.29%
1982	58	−1.40%
1990	49	−2.09%
1999	66	+3.36%
2007	65	−0.19%
2012	70	+1.49%
2017	59	−3.36%
2023	61	+0.56%
Source: INSEE

== See also ==
- Communes of the Gers department
