= Mascaras, Gers =

Mascaras
- Commune
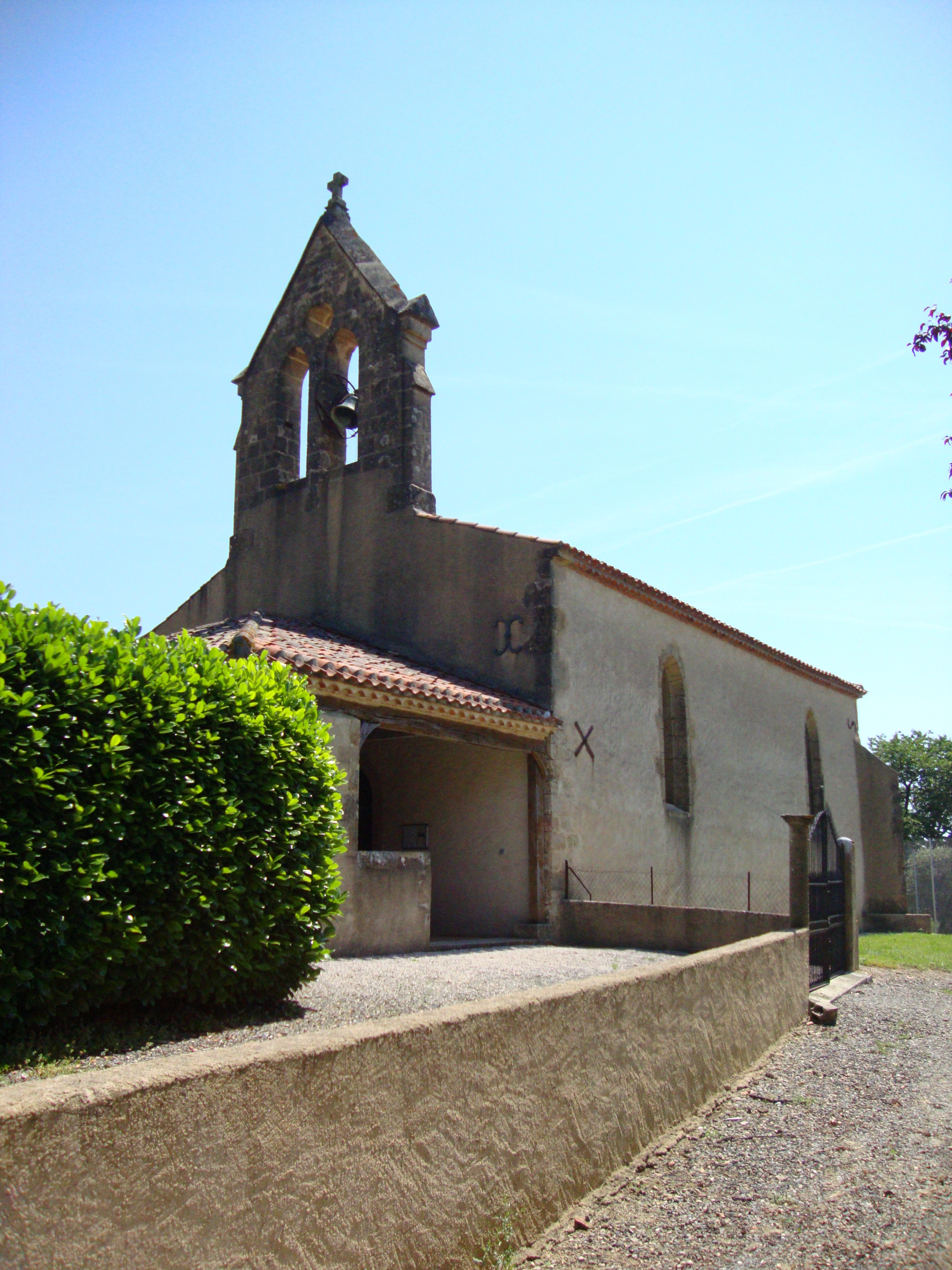
- The church in Mascaras
- Location of Mascaras
- Location within France Location within Occitanie
- Coordinates: 43°32′45″N 0°13′59″E
- Country: France
- Region: Occitania
- Department: Gers
- Arrondissement: Mirande
- Canton: Pardiac-Rivière-Basse
- Intercommunality: Cœur d'Astarac en Gascogne

Government
  - Mayor (2020–2026): Jacques Gaye
- Area^{1}: 5.95 km^{2} (2.30 sq mi)
- Elevation: 102 m (335 ft)
- Highest elevation: 283 m (928 ft)
- Lowest elevation: 173 m (568 ft)
- Population (2023): 56
  - Density: 9.4/km^{2} (24/sq mi)
- Time zone: UTC+01:00 (CET)
  - Summer (DST): UTC+02:00 (CEST)
- INSEE/Postal code: 32240 /32230
- ^{1} French Land Register data, which excludes lakes, ponds, glaciers > 1 km^{2} (0.386 sq mi or 247 acres) and river estuaries.

Mascaras is a commune in the Gers department in southwestern France.

== Geography ==
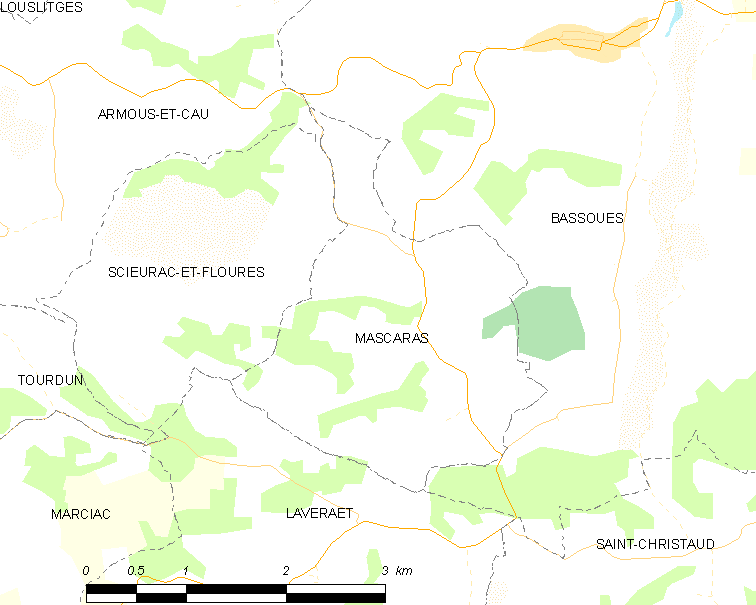
Mascaras and its surrounding communes

== Population ==
Historical population
Year	Pop.	±% p.a.
1968	57	—
1975	64	+1.67%
1982	72	+1.70%
1990	61	−2.05%
1999	52	−1.76%
2007	59	+1.59%
2012	64	+1.64%
2017	64	+0.00%
2023	56	−2.20%
Source: INSEE

== See also ==
- Communes of the Gers department
