= Troncens =

- Commune
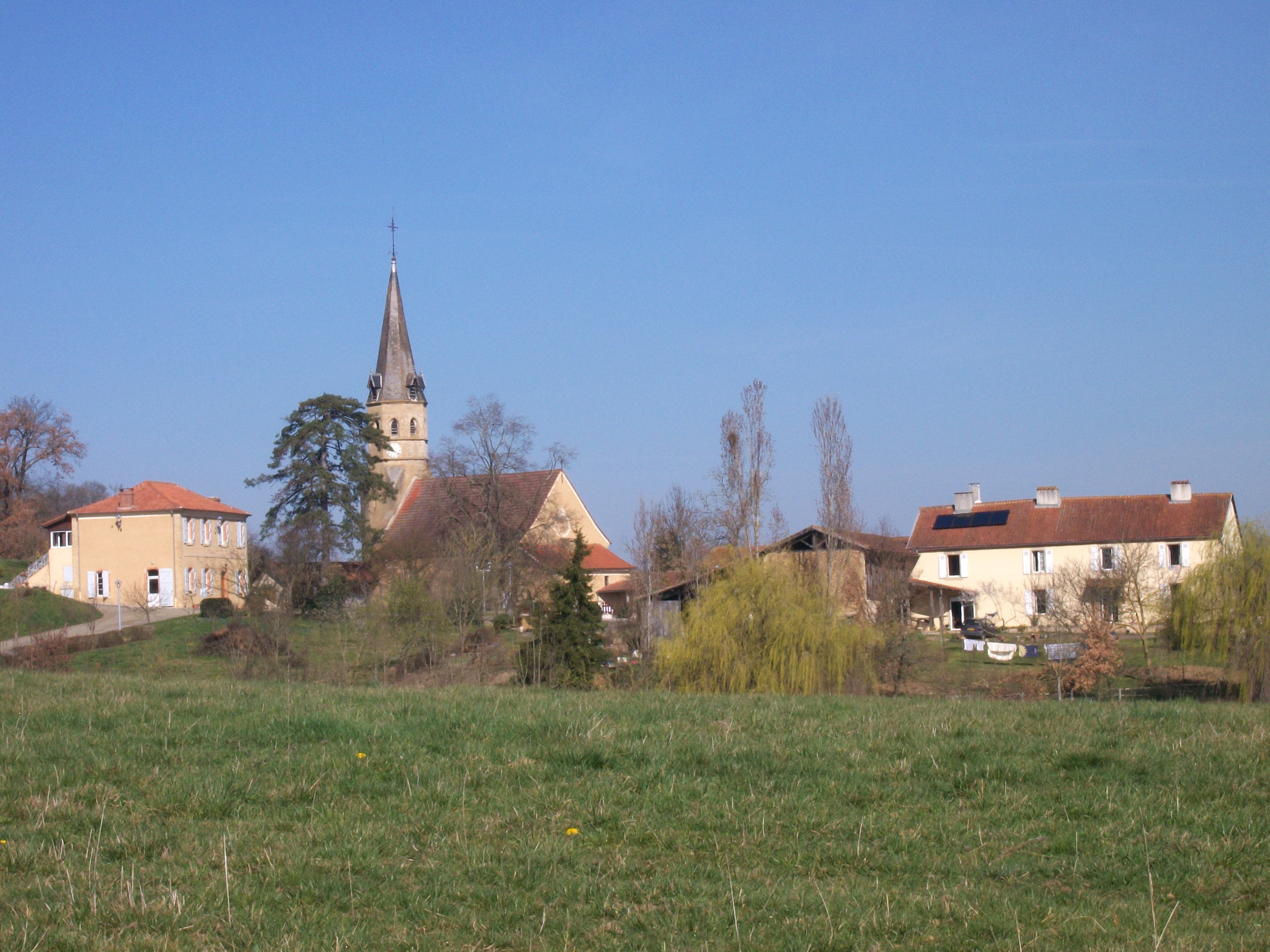
- A general view of Troncens
- Location of Troncens
- Location within France Location within Occitanie
- Coordinates: 43°27′41″N 0°12′57″E
- Country: France
- Region: Occitania
- Department: Gers
- Arrondissement: Mirande
- Canton: Pardiac-Rivière-Basse
- Intercommunality: Bastides et vallons du Gers

Government
  - Mayor (2020–2026): Francis Daguzan
- Area^{1}: 12.97 km^{2} (5.01 sq mi)
- Elevation: 150 m (490 ft)
- Highest elevation: 342 m (1,122 ft)
- Lowest elevation: 182 m (597 ft)
- Population (2023): 159
  - Density: 12.3/km^{2} (31.8/sq mi)
- Time zone: UTC+01:00 (CET)
  - Summer (DST): UTC+02:00 (CEST)
- INSEE/Postal code: 32455 /32230
- ^{1} French Land Register data, which excludes lakes, ponds, glaciers > 1 km^{2} (0.386 sq mi or 247 acres) and river estuaries.

Troncens is a commune in the Gers department of Gascony in the southwestern France.

== Geography ==
=== Localisation ===
Troncens is situated in the south of the department near the department of Hautes-Pyrénées.

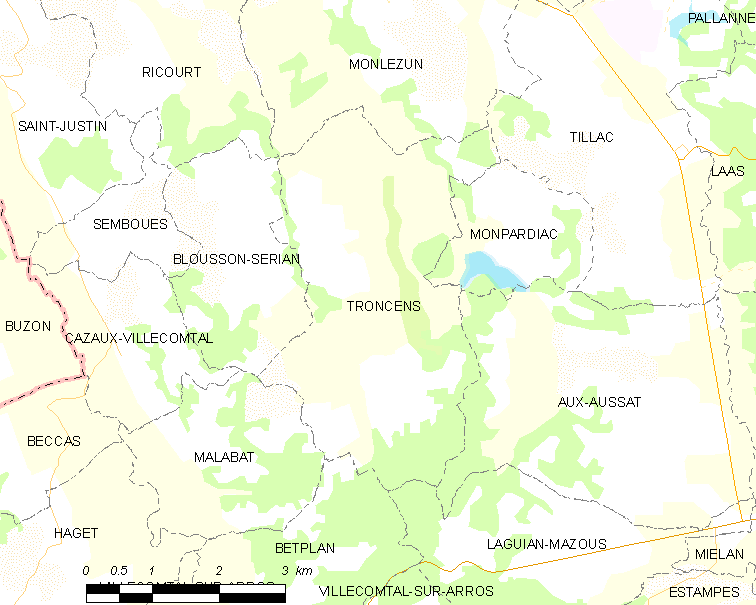
Troncens and its surrounding communes

=== Hydrography ===
The Cabournieu, right tributary of the Bouès, has its source in the town. Another tributary (left bank) of the Bouès, the Laus, runs through the town. The farms are dispersed throughout the area.

== Population ==
Historical population

Year	Pop.	±% p.a.
1793	574	—
1821	572	−0.01%
1846	632	+0.40%
1872	532	−0.66%
1901	421	−0.80%
1926	329	−0.98%
1946	278	−0.84%
1962	219	−1.48%
1968	198	−1.67%

Year	Pop.	±% p.a.
1975	197	−0.07%
1982	206	+0.64%
1990	206	+0.00%
1999	199	−0.38%
2007	185	−0.91%
2012	184	−0.11%
2017	184	+0.00%
2023	159	−2.40%

Source: EHESS and INSEE (1968-2023)

== See also ==
- Communes of the Gers department
