= Laveraët =

- Commune
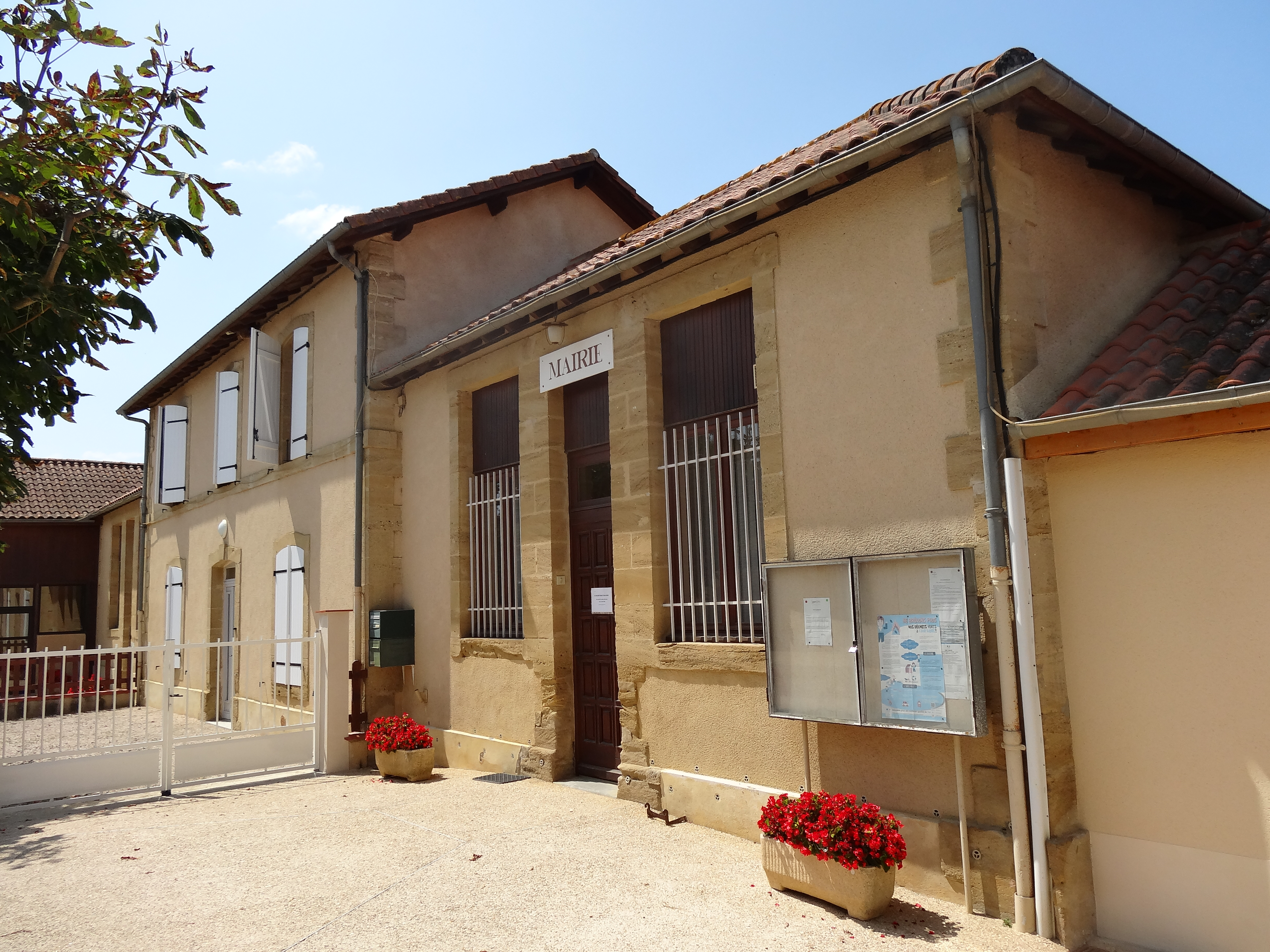
- The town hall in Laveraët
- Location of Laveraët
- Location within France Location within Occitanie
- Coordinates: 43°31′53″N 0°12′53″E
- Country: France
- Region: Occitania
- Department: Gers
- Arrondissement: Mirande
- Canton: Pardiac-Rivière-Basse
- Intercommunality: Bastides et vallons du Gers

Government
  - Mayor (2020–2026): Jean-Claude Lascombes
- Area^{1}: 11.86 km^{2} (4.58 sq mi)
- Elevation: 200 m (660 ft)
- Highest elevation: 280 m (920 ft)
- Lowest elevation: 154 m (505 ft)
- Population (2023): 103
  - Density: 8.68/km^{2} (22.5/sq mi)
- Time zone: UTC+01:00 (CET)
  - Summer (DST): UTC+02:00 (CEST)
- INSEE/Postal code: 32205 /32230
- ^{1} French Land Register data, which excludes lakes, ponds, glaciers > 1 km^{2} (0.386 sq mi or 247 acres) and river estuaries.

Laveraët is a commune in the Gers department in southwestern France.

== Geography ==
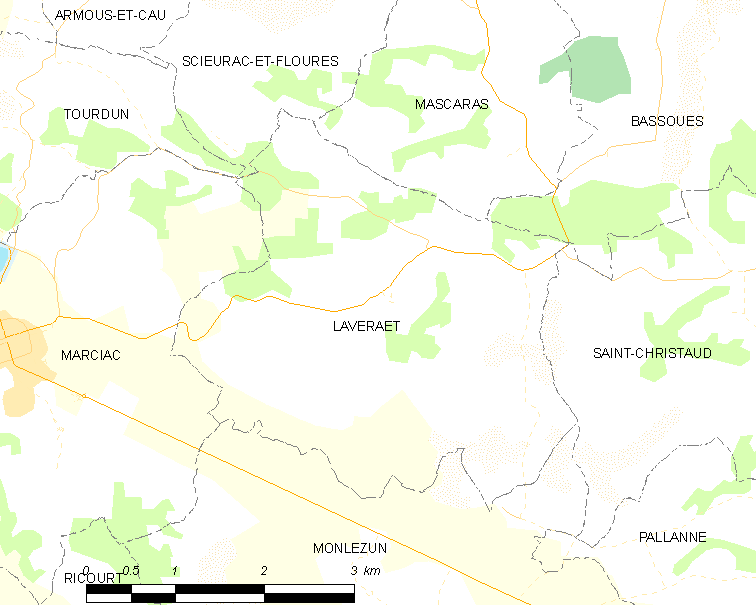
Laveraët and its surrounding communes

== Population ==
Historical population
Year	Pop.	±% p.a.
1968	173	—
1975	143	−2.68%
1982	131	−1.24%
1990	134	+0.28%
1999	104	−2.78%
2007	119	+1.70%
2012	115	−0.68%
2017	108	−1.25%
2023	103	−0.79%
Source: INSEE

== See also ==
- Communes of the Gers department
