= Blousson-Sérian =

- Commune
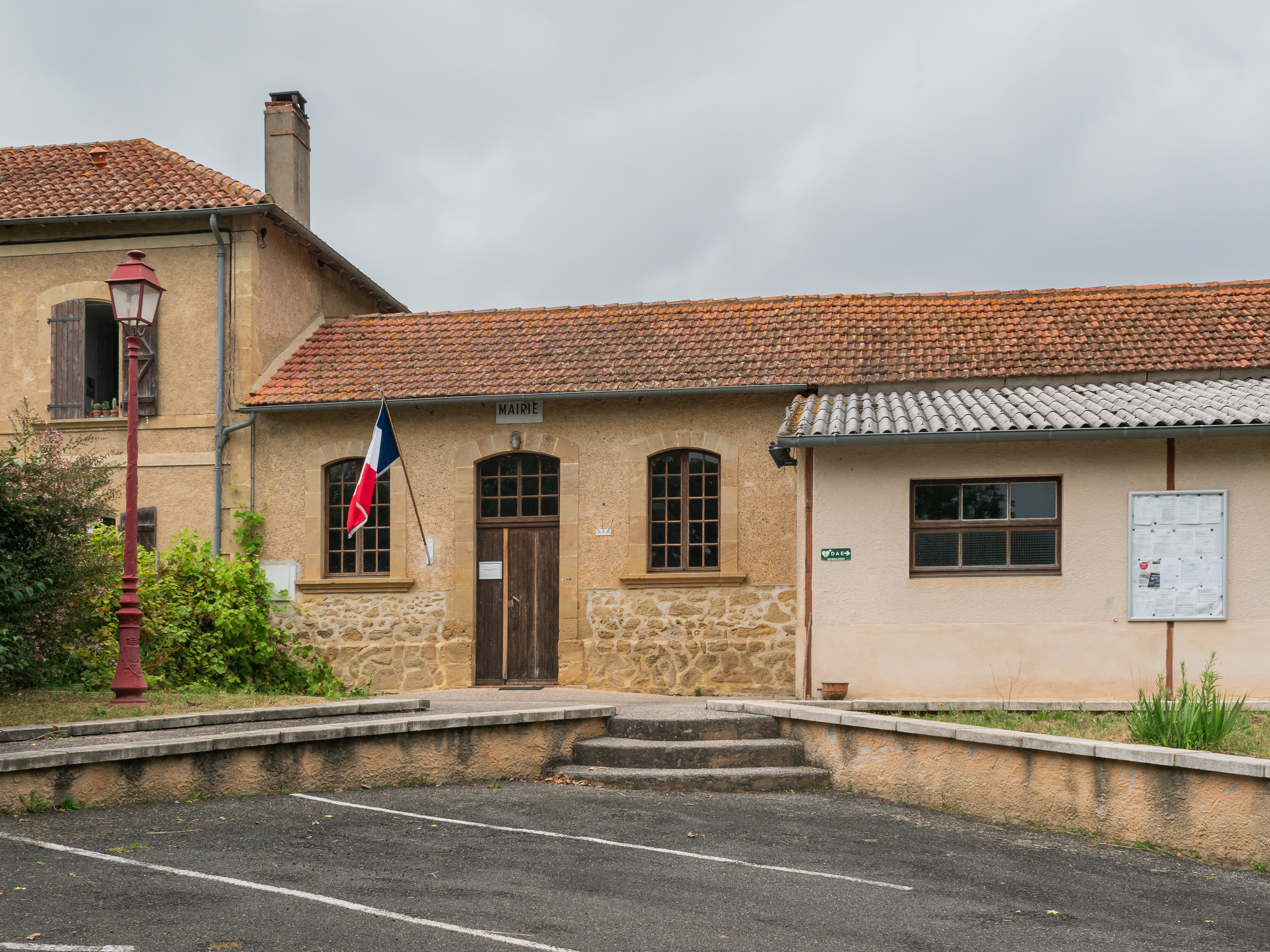
- Town hall of Blousson-Serian
- Location of Blousson-Sérian
- Location within France Location within Occitanie
- Coordinates: 43°27′39″N 0°11′46″E
- Country: France
- Region: Occitania
- Department: Gers
- Arrondissement: Mirande
- Canton: Pardiac-Rivière-Basse
- Intercommunality: Bastides et vallons du Gers

Government
  - Mayor (2020–2026): Christian Luro
- Area^{1}: 5.27 km^{2} (2.03 sq mi)
- Elevation: 224 m (735 ft)
- Highest elevation: 298 m (978 ft)
- Lowest elevation: 185 m (607 ft)
- Population (2023): 32
  - Density: 6.1/km^{2} (16/sq mi)
- Time zone: UTC+01:00 (CET)
  - Summer (DST): UTC+02:00 (CEST)
- INSEE/Postal code: 32058 /32230
- ^{1} French Land Register data, which excludes lakes, ponds, glaciers > 1 km^{2} (0.386 sq mi or 247 acres) and river estuaries.

Blousson-Sérian (French pronunciation: [blusɔ̃ seʁjɑ̃]; Gascon: Blosson e Serian) is a commune in the Gers department in southwestern France.

== Geography ==
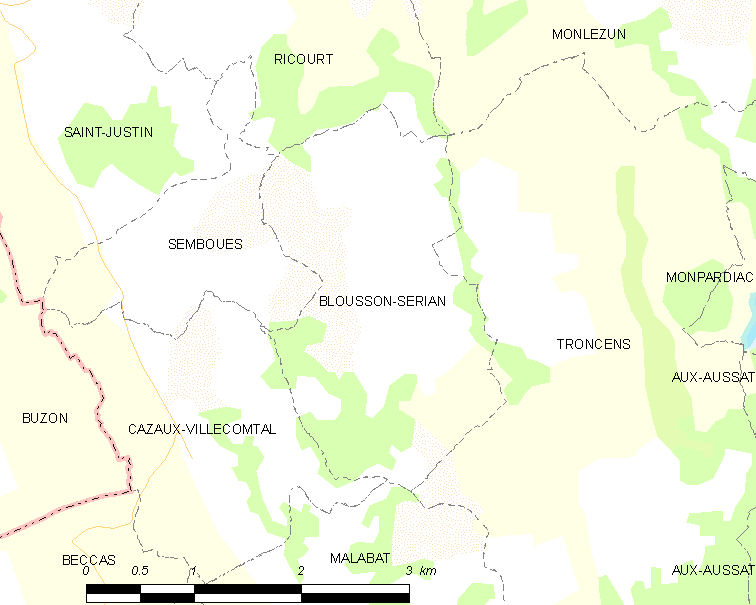
Blousson-Sérian and its surrounding communes

== Population ==
Historical population
Year	Pop.	±% p.a.
1968	70	—
1975	63	−1.49%
1982	58	−1.17%
1990	59	+0.21%
1999	50	−1.82%
2007	69	+4.11%
2012	46	−7.79%
2017	42	−1.80%
2023	32	−4.43%
Source: INSEE

== See also ==
- Communes of the Gers department
