= Izotges =

- Commune
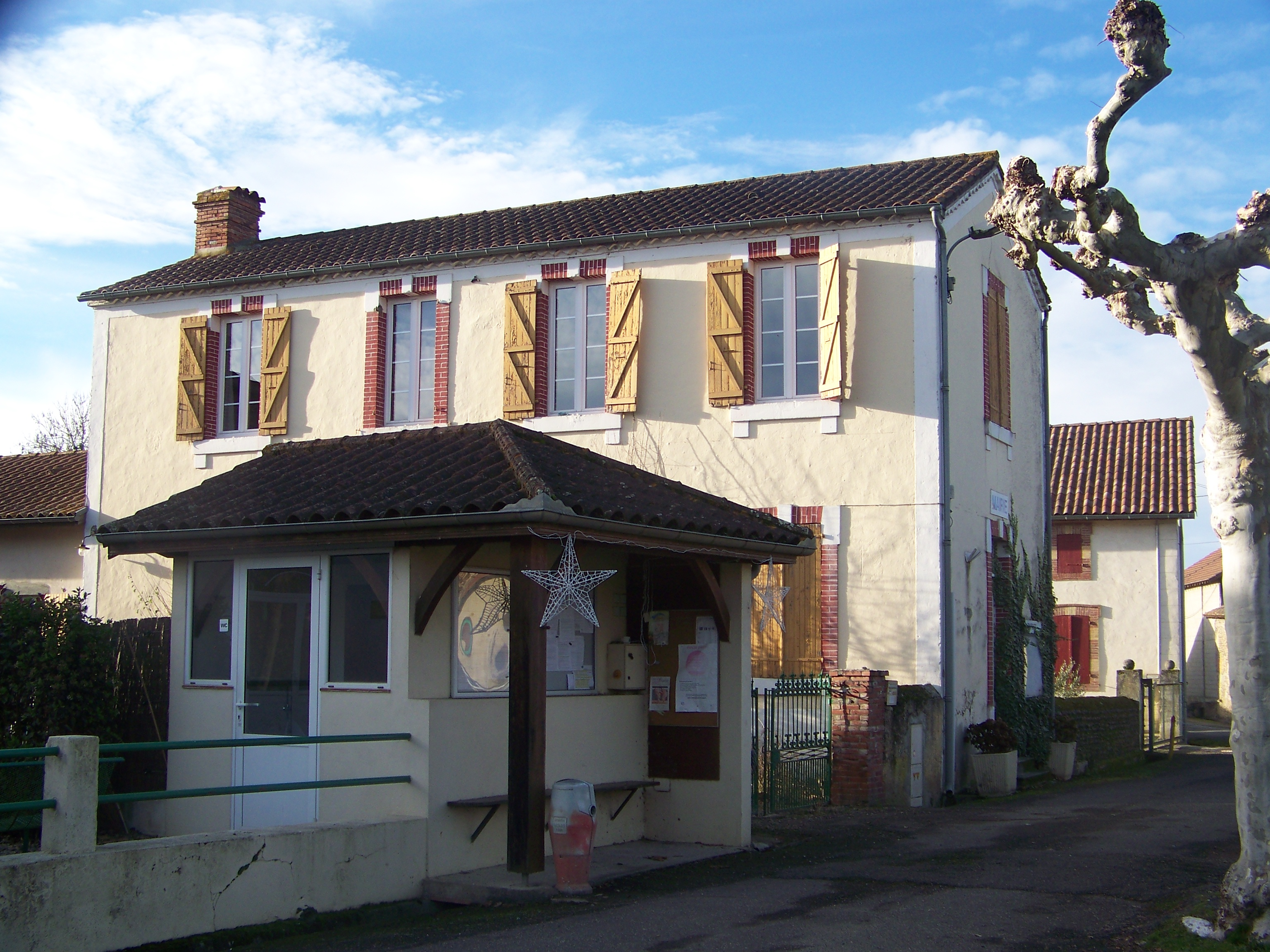
- The town hall in Izotges
- Location of Izotges
- Location within France Location within Occitanie
- Coordinates: 43°39′08″N 0°00′37″W
- Country: France
- Region: Occitania
- Department: Gers
- Arrondissement: Mirande
- Canton: Pardiac-Rivière-Basse
- Intercommunality: Bastides et Vallons du Gers

Government
  - Mayor (2020–2026): Daniel Raluy
- Area^{1}: 2.94 km^{2} (1.14 sq mi)
- Elevation: 111 m (364 ft)
- Highest elevation: 119 m (390 ft)
- Lowest elevation: 110 m (360 ft)
- Population (2023): 86
  - Density: 29/km^{2} (76/sq mi)
- Time zone: UTC+01:00 (CET)
  - Summer (DST): UTC+02:00 (CEST)
- INSEE/Postal code: 32161 /32400
- ^{1} French Land Register data, which excludes lakes, ponds, glaciers > 1 km^{2} (0.386 sq mi or 247 acres) and river estuaries.

Izotges (French pronunciation: [izɔtʒ]; Occitan: Isòtges) is a commune in the Gers department in southwestern France.

== Geography ==
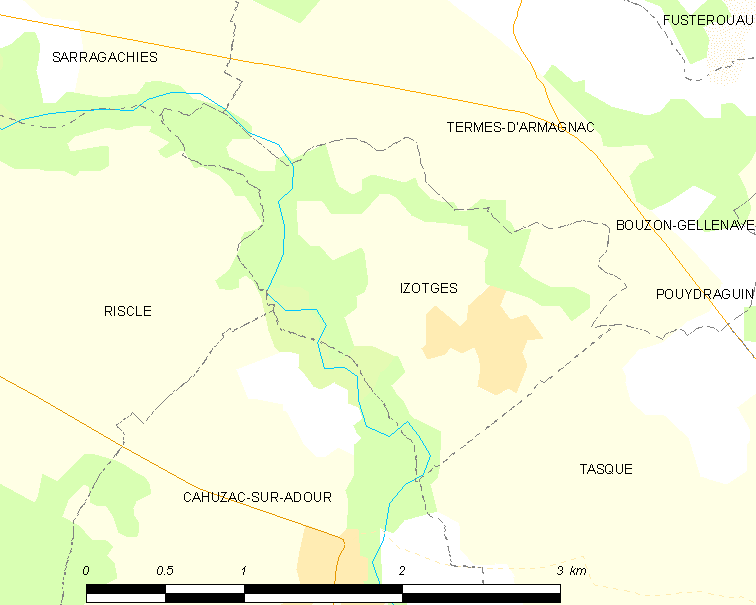
Izotges and its surrounding communes

== Population ==
Historical population
Year	Pop.	±% p.a.
1968	97	—
1975	93	−0.60%
1982	58	−6.52%
1990	69	+2.19%
1999	74	+0.78%
2007	79	+0.82%
2012	94	+3.54%
2017	105	+2.24%
2023	86	−3.27%
Source: INSEE

== See also ==
- Communes of the Gers department
