= Scieurac-et-Flourès =

- Commune
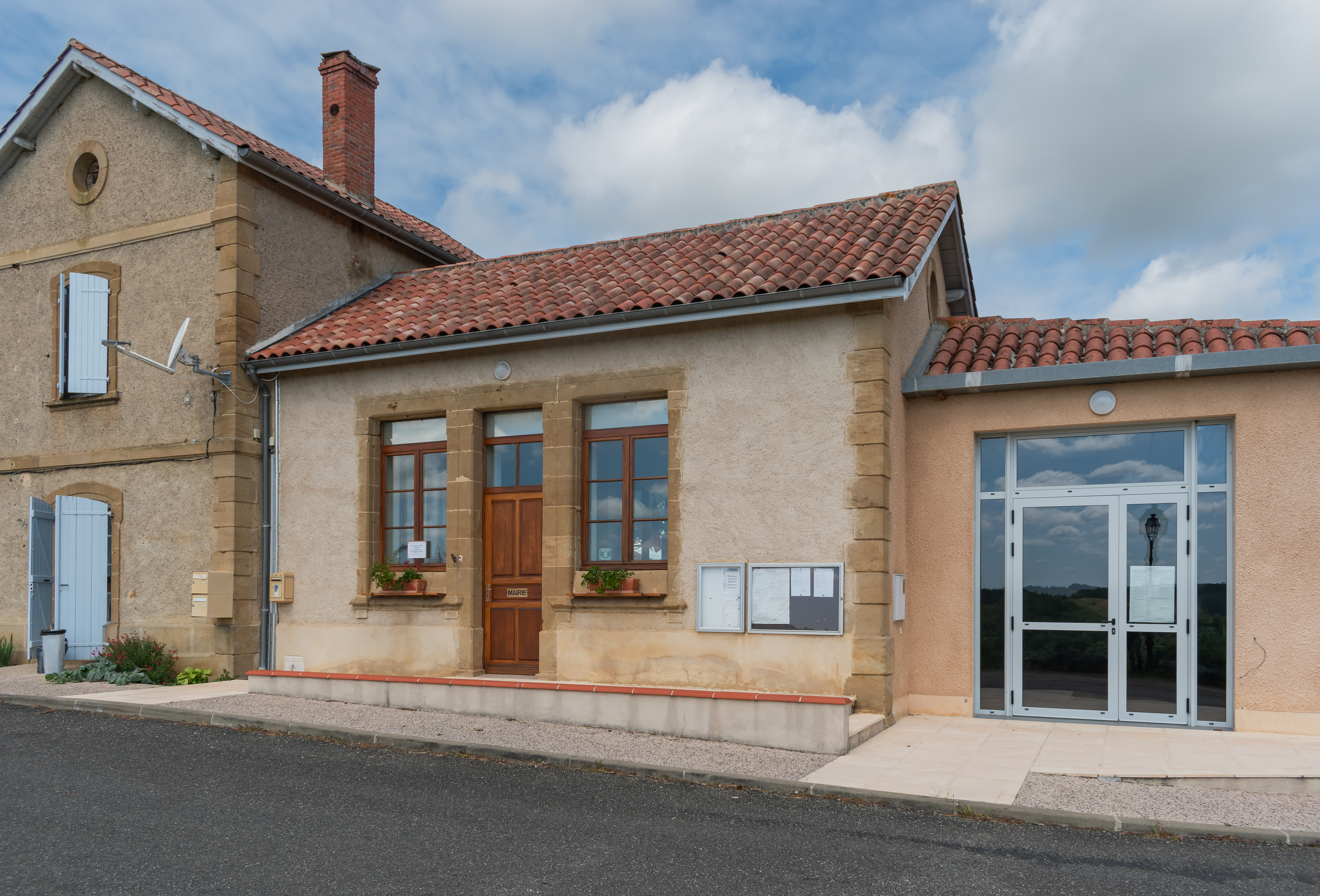
- Town hall of Scieurac-et-Floures
- Location of Scieurac-et-Flourès
- Location within France Location within Occitanie
- Coordinates: 43°33′37″N 0°12′21″E
- Country: France
- Region: Occitania
- Department: Gers
- Arrondissement: Mirande
- Canton: Pardiac-Rivière-Basse
- Intercommunality: Bastides et vallons du Gers

Government
  - Mayor (2020–2026): Claude Barbé
- Area^{1}: 5.38 km^{2} (2.08 sq mi)
- Elevation: 238 m (781 ft)
- Highest elevation: 276 m (906 ft)
- Lowest elevation: 157 m (515 ft)
- Population (2023): 44
  - Density: 8.2/km^{2} (21/sq mi)
- Time zone: UTC+01:00 (CET)
  - Summer (DST): UTC+02:00 (CEST)
- INSEE/Postal code: 32422 /32230
- ^{1} French Land Register data, which excludes lakes, ponds, glaciers > 1 km^{2} (0.386 sq mi or 247 acres) and river estuaries.

Scieurac-et-Flourès (French pronunciation: [sjøʁak e fluʁɛs]; Occitan: Siurac e Florés) is a commune in the Gers department in southwestern France.

== Geography ==
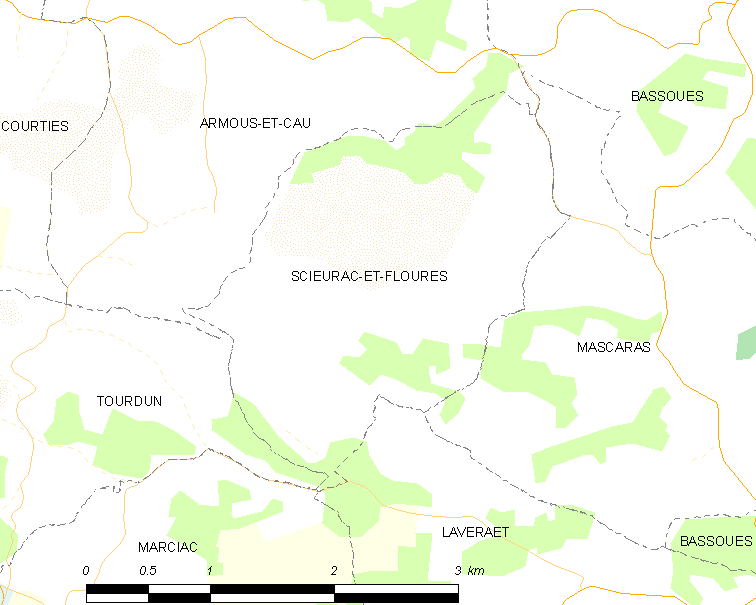
Scieurac-et-Flourès and its surrounding communes

== Population ==
Historical population
Year	Pop.	±% p.a.
1968	77	—
1975	51	−5.72%
1982	72	+5.05%
1990	62	−1.85%
1999	50	−2.36%
2007	45	−1.31%
2012	48	+1.30%
2017	40	−3.58%
2023	44	+1.60%
Source: INSEE

== See also ==
- Communes of the Gers department
