= Ricourt =

- Commune
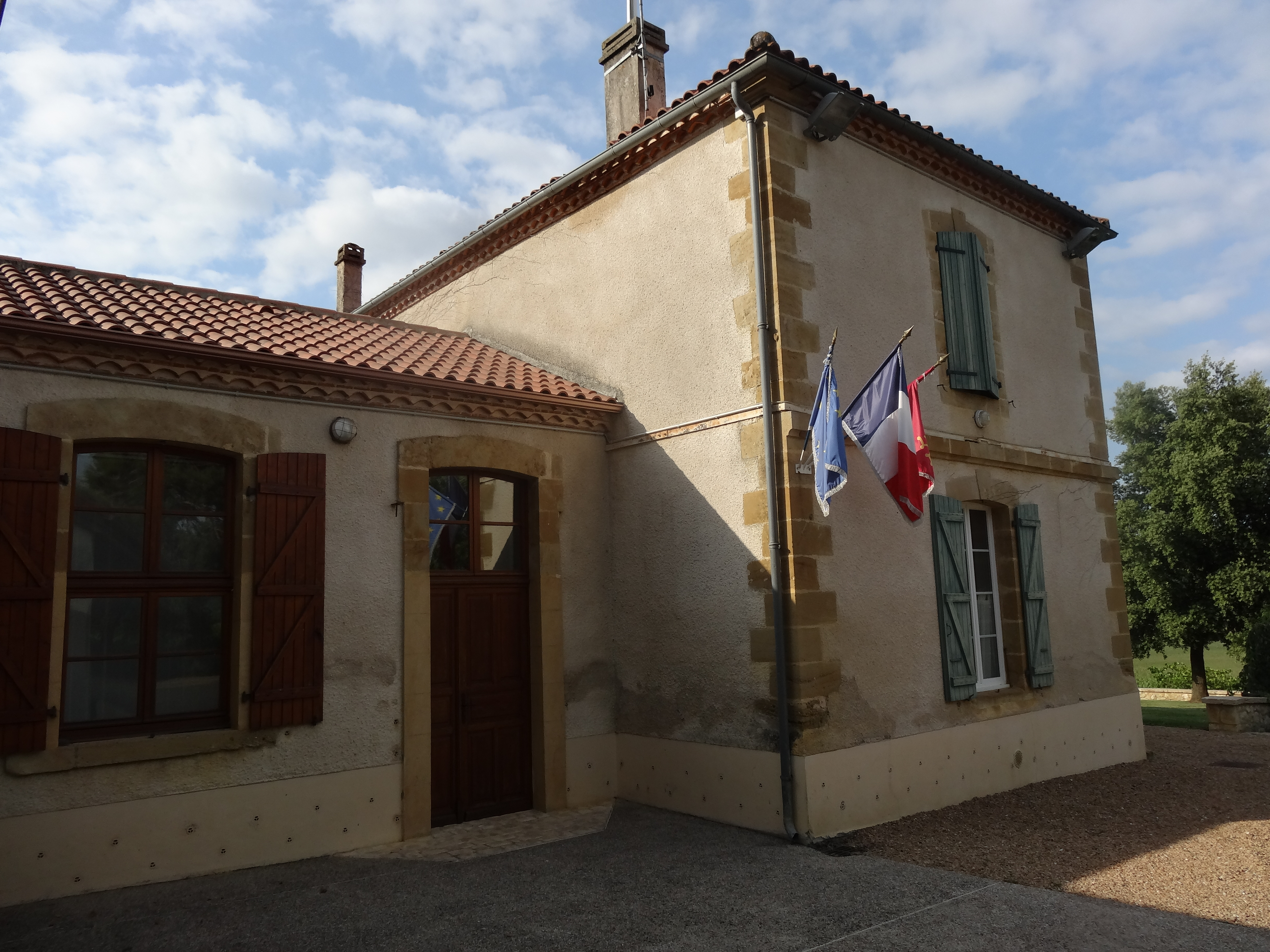
- The town hall in Ricourt
- Location of Ricourt
- Location within France Location within Occitanie
- Coordinates: 43°29′19″N 0°10′41″E
- Country: France
- Region: Occitania
- Department: Gers
- Arrondissement: Mirande
- Canton: Pardiac-Rivière-Basse
- Intercommunality: Bastides et vallons du Gers

Government
  - Mayor (2020–2026): Gérard Lille
- Area^{1}: 7.87 km^{2} (3.04 sq mi)
- Elevation: 325 m (1,066 ft)
- Highest elevation: 270 m (890 ft)
- Lowest elevation: 162 m (531 ft)
- Population (2023): 44
  - Density: 5.6/km^{2} (14/sq mi)
- Time zone: UTC+01:00 (CET)
  - Summer (DST): UTC+02:00 (CEST)
- INSEE/Postal code: 32342 /32230
- ^{1} French Land Register data, which excludes lakes, ponds, glaciers > 1 km^{2} (0.386 sq mi or 247 acres) and river estuaries.

Ricourt (French pronunciation: [ʁikuʁ]; Gascon: Ricort) is a commune in the Gers department in south-western France.

== Geography ==
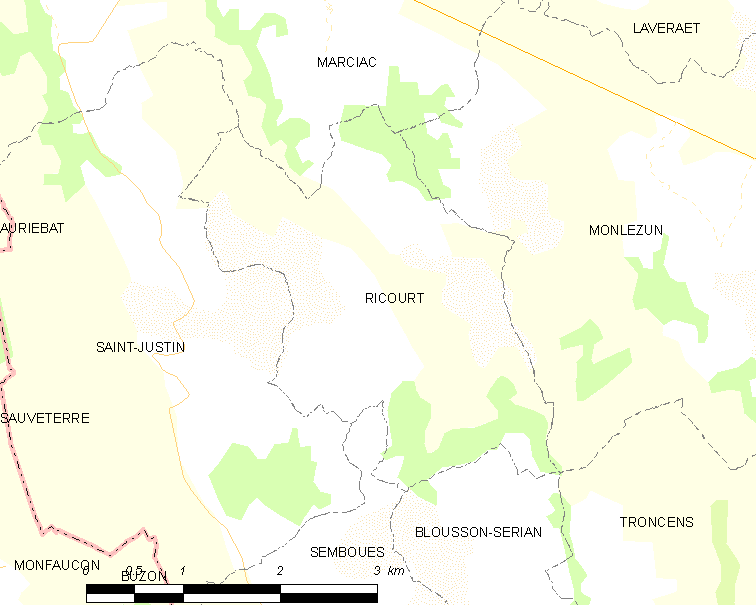
Ricourt and its surrounding communes

== Population ==
Historical population
Year	Pop.	±% p.a.
1968	66	—
1975	60	−1.35%
1982	68	+1.80%
1990	44	−5.30%
1999	66	+4.61%
2007	68	+0.37%
2012	79	+3.04%
2017	67	−3.24%
2023	44	−6.77%
Source: INSEE

== See also ==
- Communes of the Gers department
