= Monpardiac =

- Commune
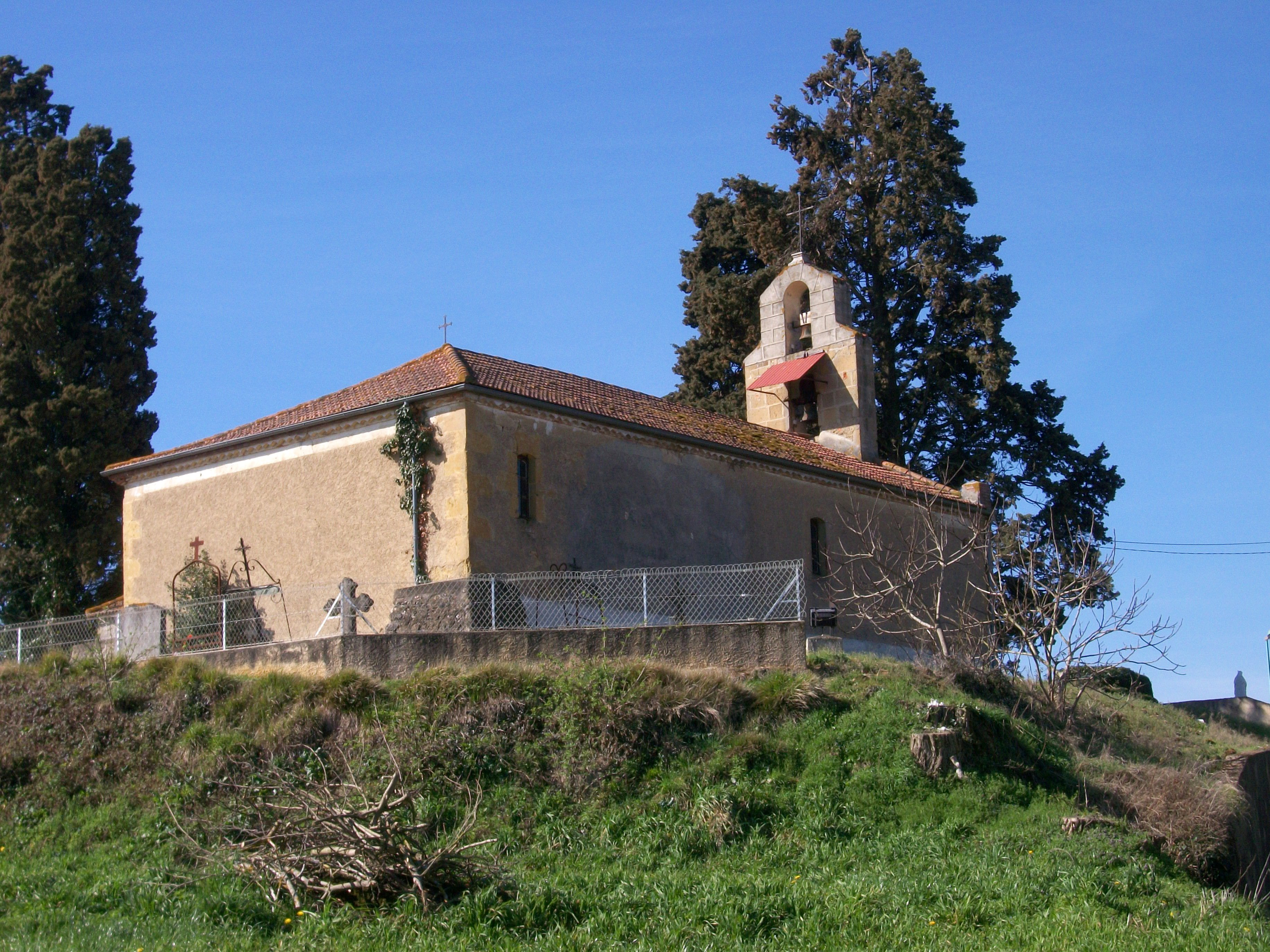
- The church in Monpardiac
- Location of Monpardiac
- Location within France Location within Occitanie
- Coordinates: 43°27′53″N 0°14′41″E
- Country: France
- Region: Occitania
- Department: Gers
- Arrondissement: Mirande
- Canton: Pardiac-Rivière-Basse
- Intercommunality: Bastides et vallons du Gers

Government
  - Mayor (2020–2026): Lucette Noilhan
- Area^{1}: 3.5 km^{2} (1.4 sq mi)
- Elevation: 180 m (590 ft)
- Highest elevation: 284 m (932 ft)
- Lowest elevation: 193 m (633 ft)
- Population (2023): 35
  - Density: 10/km^{2} (26/sq mi)
- Time zone: UTC+01:00 (CET)
  - Summer (DST): UTC+02:00 (CEST)
- INSEE/Postal code: 32275 /32170
- ^{1} French Land Register data, which excludes lakes, ponds, glaciers > 1 km^{2} (0.386 sq mi or 247 acres) and river estuaries.

Monpardiac (French pronunciation: [mɔ̃paʁdjak]; Occitan: Montpardiac) is a commune in the Gers department in southwestern France.

== Geography ==
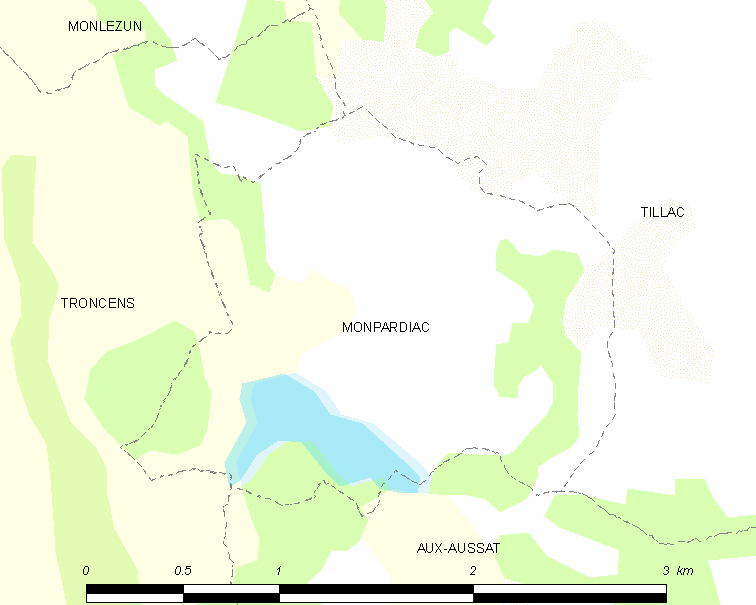
Monpardiac and its surrounding communes

== Population ==
Historical population
Year	Pop.	±% p.a.
1968	60	—
1975	51	−2.29%
1982	43	−2.41%
1990	39	−1.21%
1999	33	−1.84%
2007	37	+1.44%
2012	46	+4.45%
2017	45	−0.44%
2023	35	−4.10%
Source: INSEE

== See also ==
- Communes of the Gers department
