= Lasserrade =

- Commune
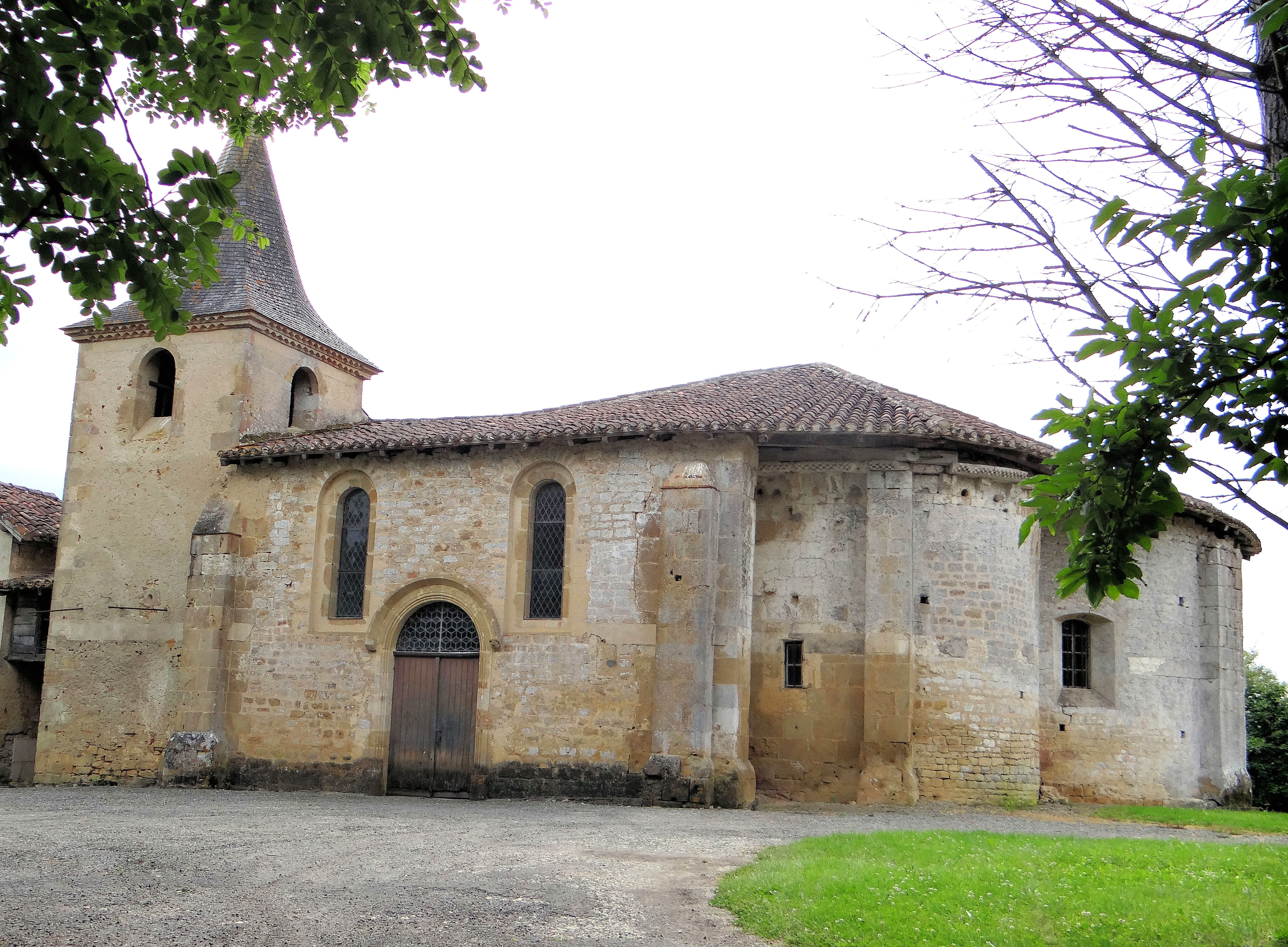
- The church in Lasserrade
- Location of Lasserrade
- Location within France Location within Occitanie
- Coordinates: 43°37′33″N 0°03′51″E
- Country: France
- Region: Occitania
- Department: Gers
- Arrondissement: Mirande
- Canton: Pardiac-Rivière-Basse

Government
  - Mayor (2020–2026): Isabelle Blanchard
- Area^{1}: 12.76 km^{2} (4.93 sq mi)
- Elevation: 180 m (590 ft)
- Highest elevation: 204 m (669 ft)
- Lowest elevation: 120 m (390 ft)
- Population (2023): 177
  - Density: 13.9/km^{2} (35.9/sq mi)
- Time zone: UTC+01:00 (CET)
  - Summer (DST): UTC+02:00 (CEST)
- INSEE/Postal code: 32199 /32160
- ^{1} French Land Register data, which excludes lakes, ponds, glaciers > 1 km^{2} (0.386 sq mi or 247 acres) and river estuaries.

Lasserrade (before 2020: Lasserade) is a commune in the Gers department in southwestern France.

== Geography ==
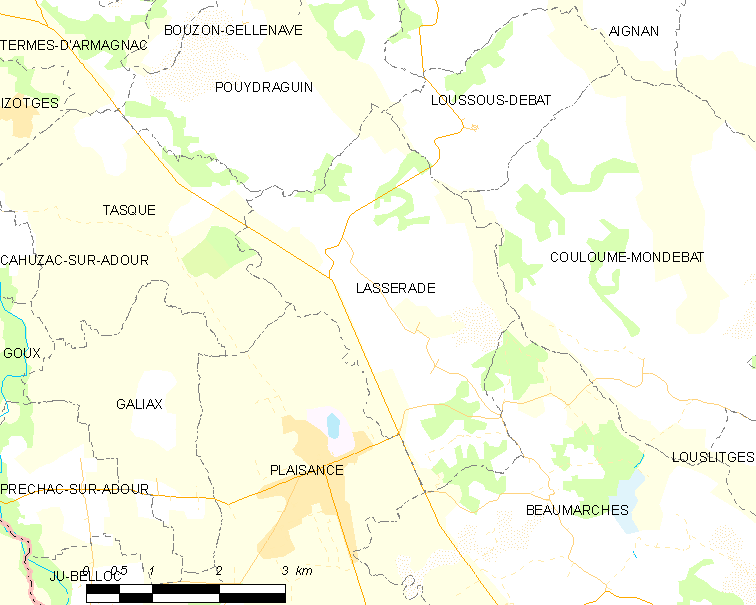
Lasserrade and its surrounding communes

== Population ==
Historical population
Year	Pop.	±% p.a.
1968	295	—
1975	268	−1.36%
1982	251	−0.93%
1990	211	−2.15%
1999	226	+0.77%
2007	203	−1.33%
2012	212	+0.87%
2017	197	−1.46%
2023	177	−1.77%
Source: INSEE

== See also ==
- Communes of the Gers department
