= Tourdun =

- Commune
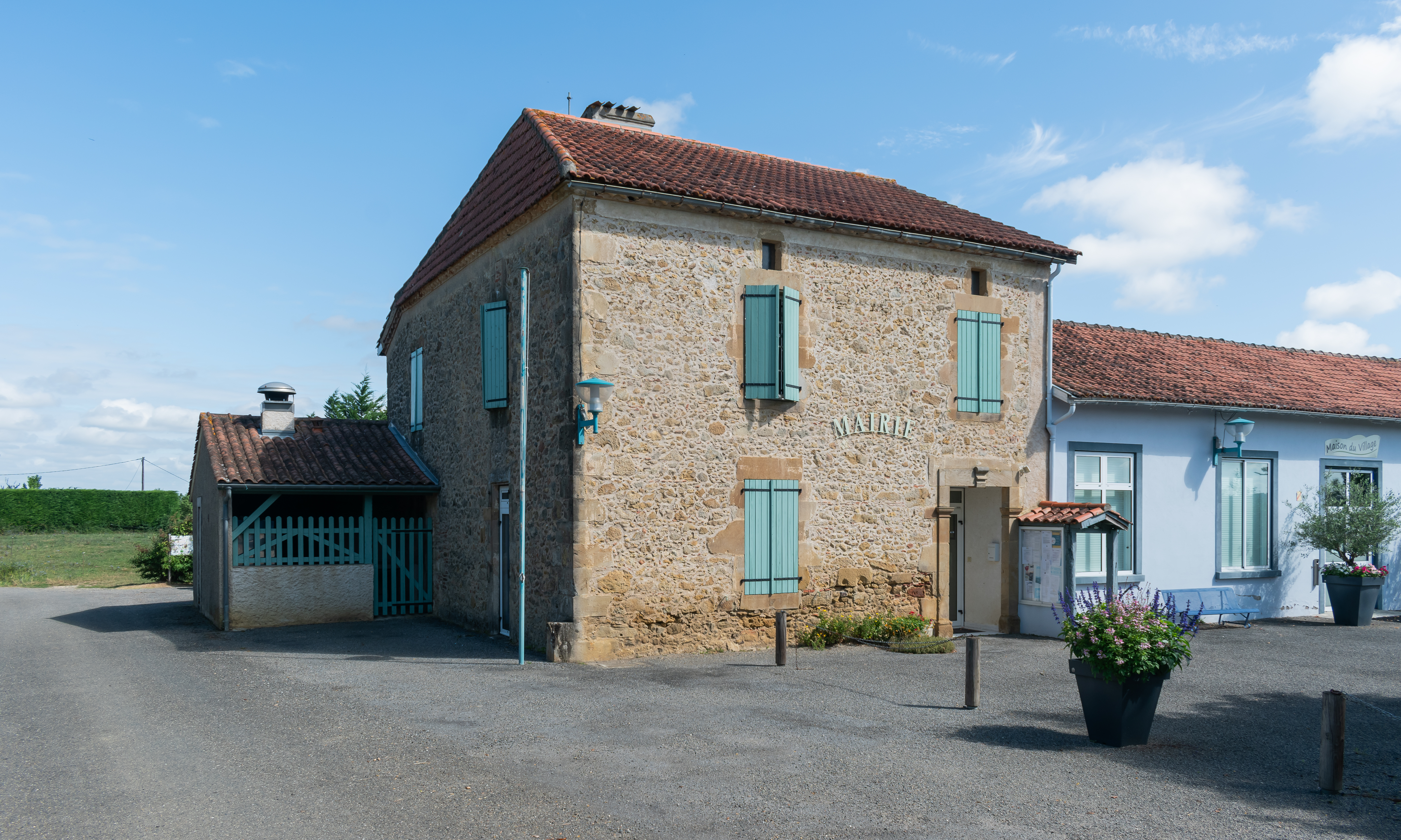
- Town hall of Tourdun
- Location of Tourdun
- Location within France Location within Occitanie
- Coordinates: 43°32′52″N 0°09′08″E
- Country: France
- Region: Occitania
- Department: Gers
- Arrondissement: Mirande
- Canton: Pardiac-Rivière-Basse
- Intercommunality: Bastides et vallons du Gers

Government
  - Mayor (2020–2026): Patrick Marchesin
- Area^{1}: 6.95 km^{2} (2.68 sq mi)
- Elevation: 160 m (520 ft)
- Highest elevation: 240 m (790 ft)
- Lowest elevation: 141 m (463 ft)
- Population (2023): 117
  - Density: 16.8/km^{2} (43.6/sq mi)
- Time zone: UTC+01:00 (CET)
  - Summer (DST): UTC+02:00 (CEST)
- INSEE/Postal code: 32450 /32230
- ^{1} French Land Register data, which excludes lakes, ponds, glaciers > 1 km^{2} (0.386 sq mi or 247 acres) and river estuaries.

Tourdun (French pronunciation: [tuʁdœ̃]; Gascon: Tordun) is a commune in the Gers department in southwestern France.

== Geography ==
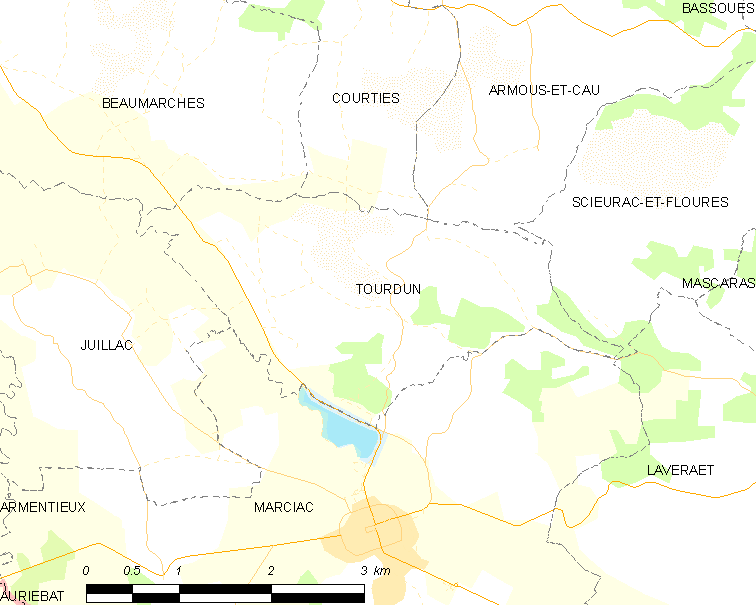
Tourdun and its surrounding communes

== Population ==
Historical population
Year	Pop.	±% p.a.
1968	97	—
1975	88	−1.38%
1982	85	−0.49%
1990	91	+0.86%
1999	105	+1.60%
2007	98	−0.86%
2012	99	+0.20%
2017	117	+3.40%
2023	117	+0.00%
Source: INSEE

== See also ==
- Communes of the Gers department
