= Estipouy =

- Commune
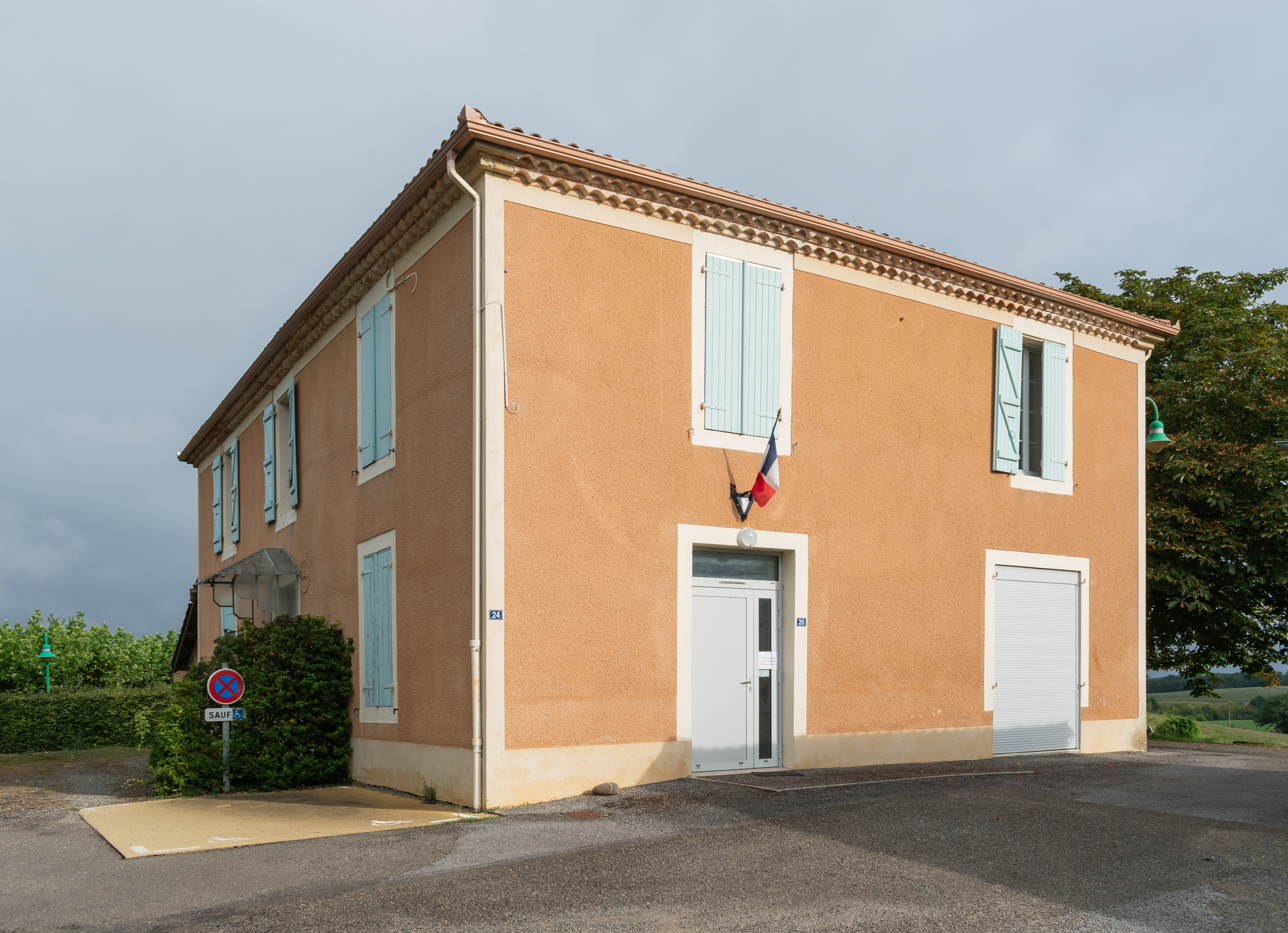
- Town hall of Estipouy
- Location of Estipouy
- Location within France Location within Occitanie
- Coordinates: 43°33′02″N 0°22′51″E
- Country: France
- Region: Occitania
- Department: Gers
- Arrondissement: Mirande
- Canton: Pardiac-Rivière-Basse

Government
  - Mayor (2020–2026): Antoine Mendes
- Area^{1}: 11.69 km^{2} (4.51 sq mi)
- Elevation: 250 m (820 ft)
- Highest elevation: 256 m (840 ft)
- Lowest elevation: 139 m (456 ft)
- Population (2023): 204
  - Density: 17.5/km^{2} (45.2/sq mi)
- Time zone: UTC+01:00 (CET)
  - Summer (DST): UTC+02:00 (CEST)
- INSEE/Postal code: 32128 /32300
- ^{1} French Land Register data, which excludes lakes, ponds, glaciers > 1 km^{2} (0.386 sq mi or 247 acres) and river estuaries.

Estipouy (French pronunciation: [ɛstipwi]; Occitan: Estipuèi) is a commune in the Gers department in southwestern France.

== Geography ==
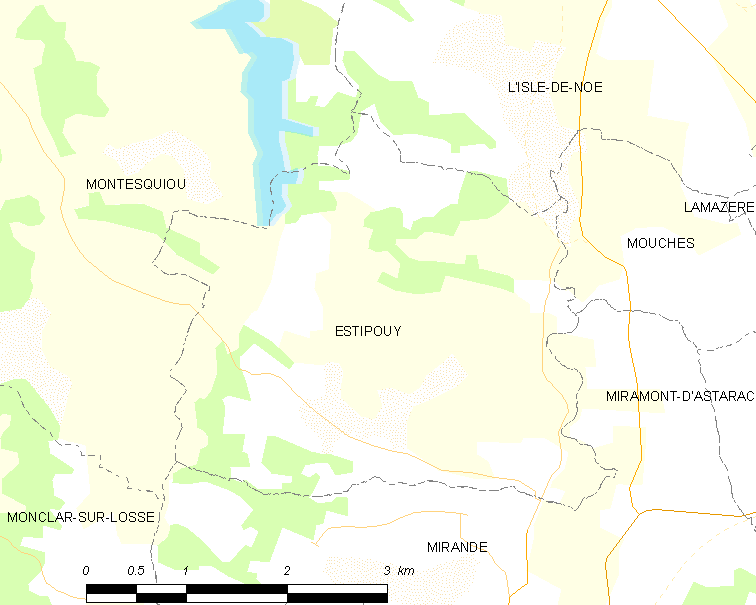
Estipouy and its surrounding communes

== Population ==
Historical population
Year	Pop.	±% p.a.
1968	172	—
1975	147	−2.22%
1982	133	−1.42%
1990	150	+1.51%
1999	193	+2.84%
2007	192	−0.06%
2012	205	+1.32%
2017	208	+0.29%
2023	204	−0.32%
Source: INSEE

== See also ==
- Communes of the Gers department
