= Armous-et-Cau =

- Commune
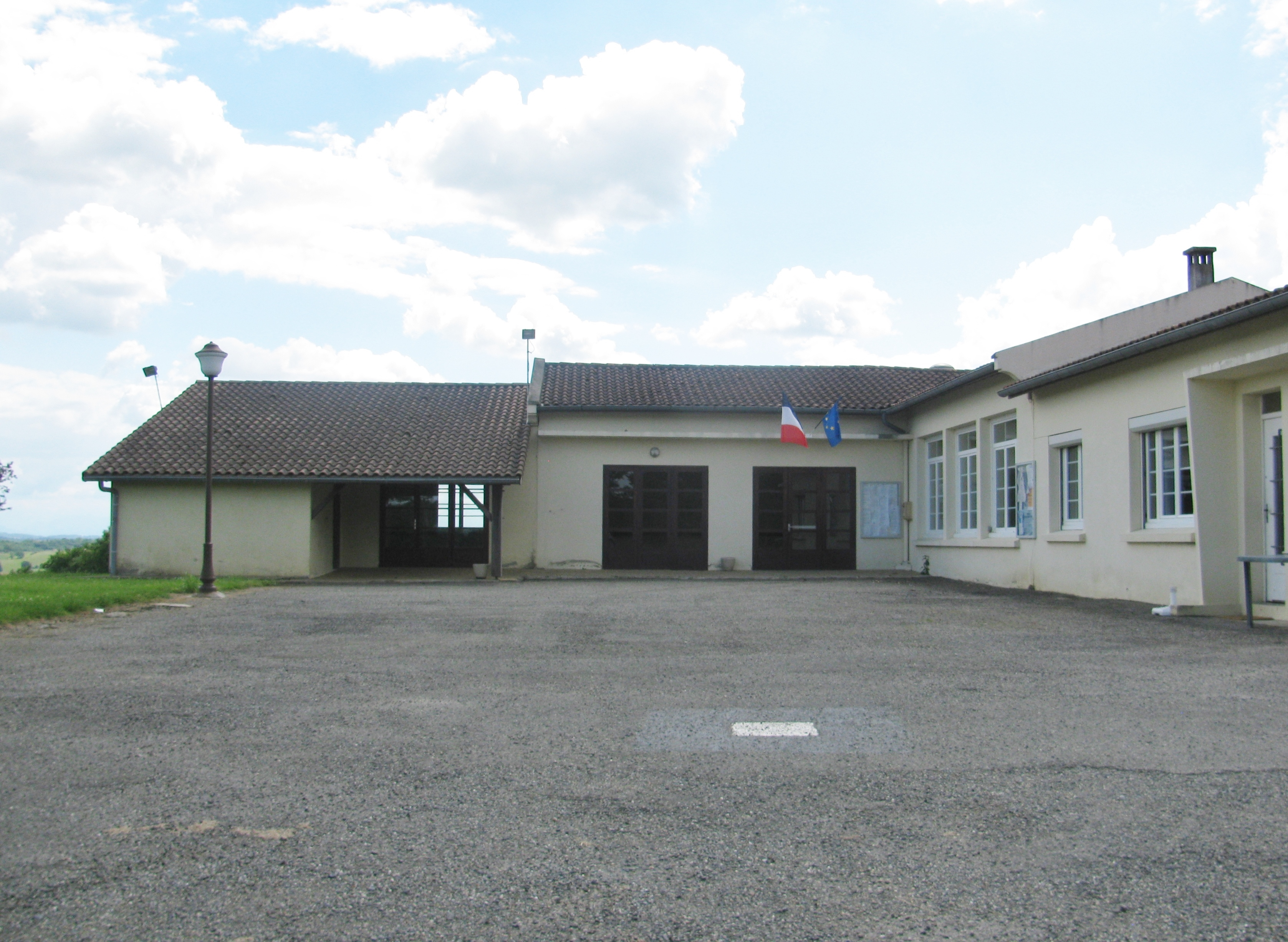
- The town hall in Armous-et-Cau
- Location of Armous-et-Cau
- Location within France Location within Occitanie
- Coordinates: 43°34′27″N 0°11′27″E
- Country: France
- Region: Occitania
- Department: Gers
- Arrondissement: Mirande
- Canton: Pardiac-Rivière-Basse
- Intercommunality: CC Cœur Astarac Gascogne

Government
  - Mayor (2020–2026): Jean-Paul Doubrere
- Area^{1}: 9.33 km^{2} (3.60 sq mi)
- Elevation: 175 m (574 ft)
- Highest elevation: 279 m (915 ft)
- Lowest elevation: 152 m (499 ft)
- Population (2023): 96
  - Density: 10/km^{2} (27/sq mi)
- Time zone: UTC+01:00 (CET)
  - Summer (DST): UTC+02:00 (CEST)
- INSEE/Postal code: 32009 /32230
- ^{1} French Land Register data, which excludes lakes, ponds, glaciers > 1 km^{2} (0.386 sq mi or 247 acres) and river estuaries.

Armous-et-Cau is a commune in the Gers department in southwestern France.

== Geography ==
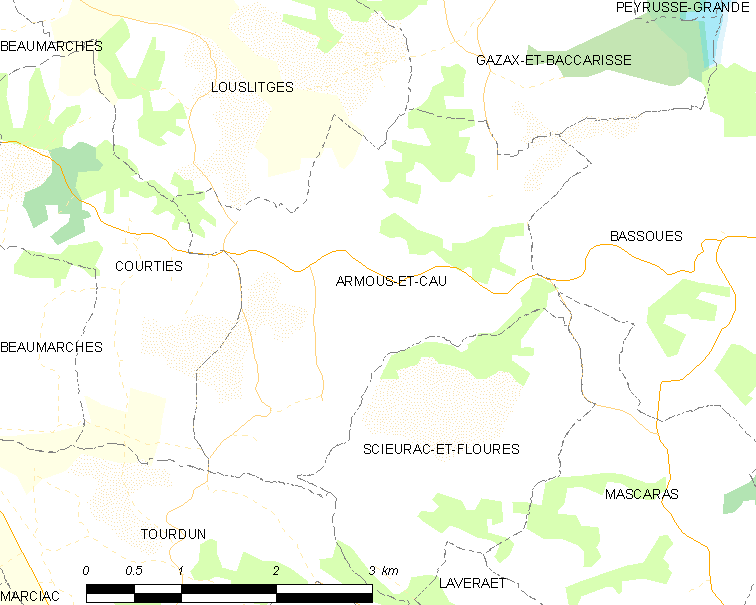
Armous-et-Cau and its surrounding communes

== Population ==
Historical population
Year	Pop.	±% p.a.
1968	117	—
1975	104	−1.67%
1982	81	−3.51%
1990	82	+0.15%
1999	90	+1.04%
2007	96	+0.81%
2012	99	+0.62%
2017	86	−2.78%
2023	96	+1.85%
Source: INSEE

== See also ==
- Communes of the Gers department
