= Cazaux-Villecomtal =

- Commune
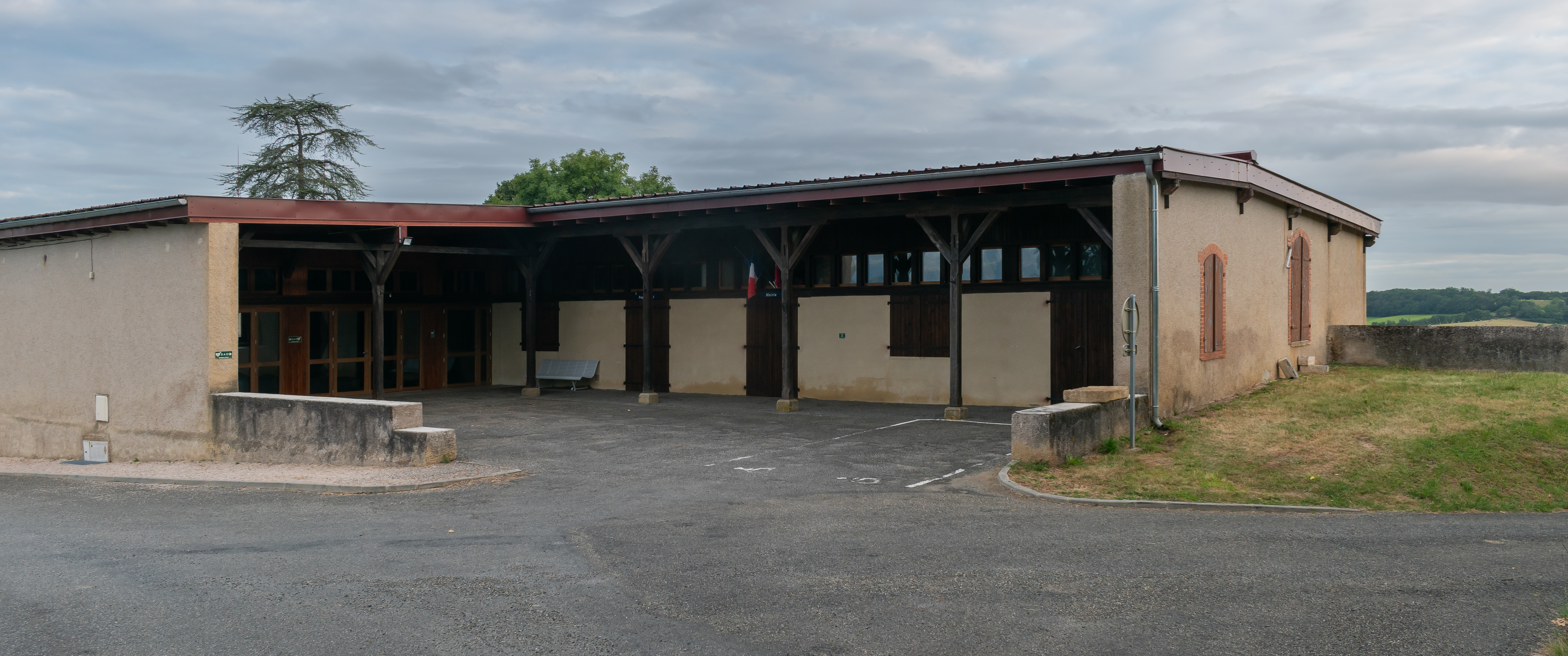
- Town hall of Cazaux-Villecomtal
- Location of Cazaux-Villecomtal
- Location within France Location within Occitanie
- Coordinates: 43°27′15″N 0°10′28″E
- Country: France
- Region: Occitania
- Department: Gers
- Arrondissement: Mirande
- Canton: Pardiac-Rivière-Basse
- Intercommunality: Bastides et vallons du Gers

Government
  - Mayor (2020–2026): Maryse Abadie
- Area^{1}: 4.13 km^{2} (1.59 sq mi)
- Elevation: 247 m (810 ft)
- Highest elevation: 275 m (902 ft)
- Lowest elevation: 157 m (515 ft)
- Population (2023): 72
  - Density: 17/km^{2} (45/sq mi)
- Time zone: UTC+01:00 (CET)
  - Summer (DST): UTC+02:00 (CEST)
- INSEE/Postal code: 32099 /32230
- ^{1} French Land Register data, which excludes lakes, ponds, glaciers > 1 km^{2} (0.386 sq mi or 247 acres) and river estuaries.

Cazaux-Villecomtal (French pronunciation: [kazo vilkɔ̃tal]; Occitan: Casaus Vilacomdau) is a commune in the Gers department in southwestern France.

== Geography ==
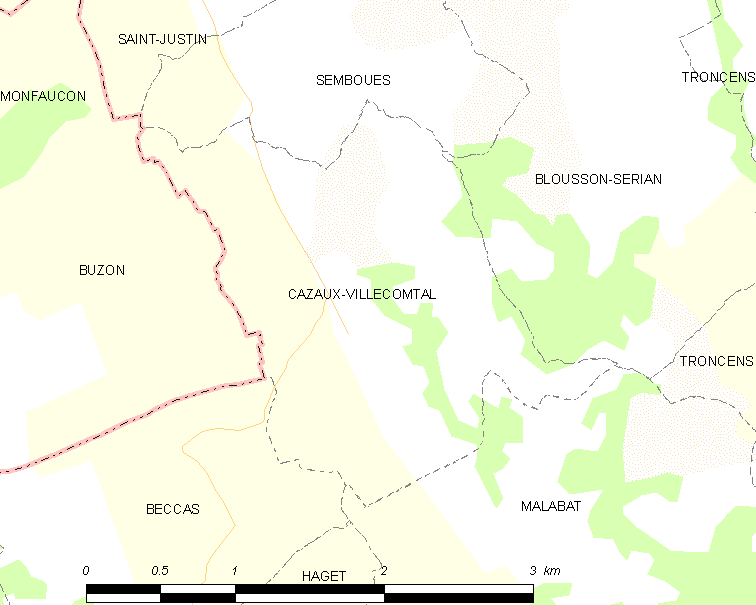
Cazaux-Villecomtal and its surrounding communes

== Population ==
Historical population
Year	Pop.	±% p.a.
1968	98	—
1975	92	−0.90%
1982	94	+0.31%
1990	91	−0.40%
1999	83	−1.02%
2007	83	+0.00%
2012	89	+1.41%
2017	71	−4.42%
2023	72	+0.23%
Source: INSEE

== See also ==
- Communes of the Gers department
