= Galiax =

- Commune
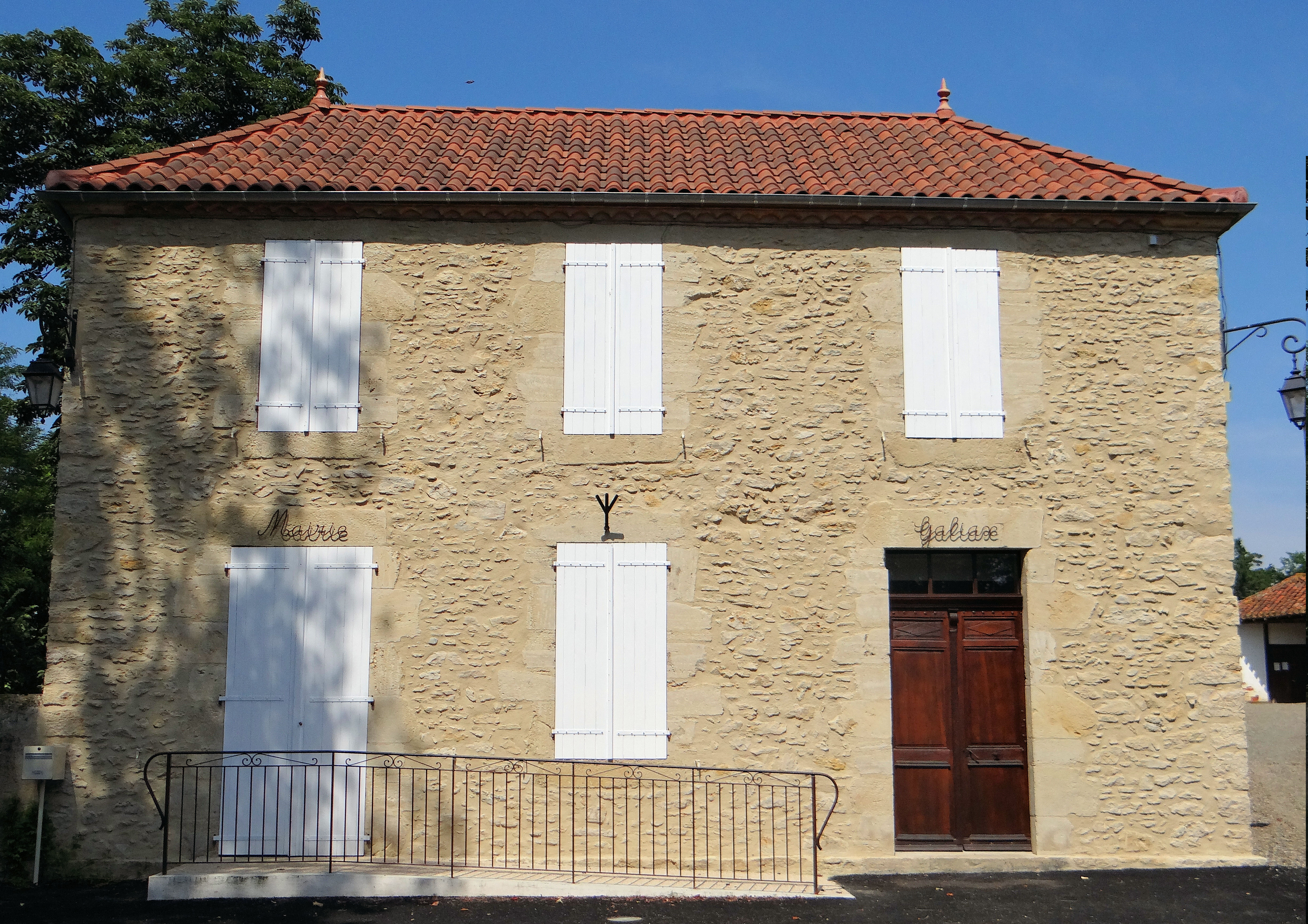
- The town hall
- Location of Galiax
- Location within France Location within Occitanie
- Coordinates: 43°36′59″N 0°00′56″E
- Country: France
- Region: Occitania
- Department: Gers
- Arrondissement: Mirande
- Canton: Pardiac-Rivière-Basse
- Intercommunality: Bastides et vallons du Gers

Government
  - Mayor (2020–2026): Jean Pagès
- Area^{1}: 6.05 km^{2} (2.34 sq mi)
- Elevation: 131 m (430 ft)
- Highest elevation: 142 m (466 ft)
- Lowest elevation: 123 m (404 ft)
- Population (2023): 186
  - Density: 30.7/km^{2} (79.6/sq mi)
- Time zone: UTC+01:00 (CET)
  - Summer (DST): UTC+02:00 (CEST)
- INSEE/Postal code: 32136 /32160
- ^{1} French Land Register data, which excludes lakes, ponds, glaciers > 1 km^{2} (0.386 sq mi or 247 acres) and river estuaries.

Galiax is a commune in the Gers department in southwestern France.

== Geography ==
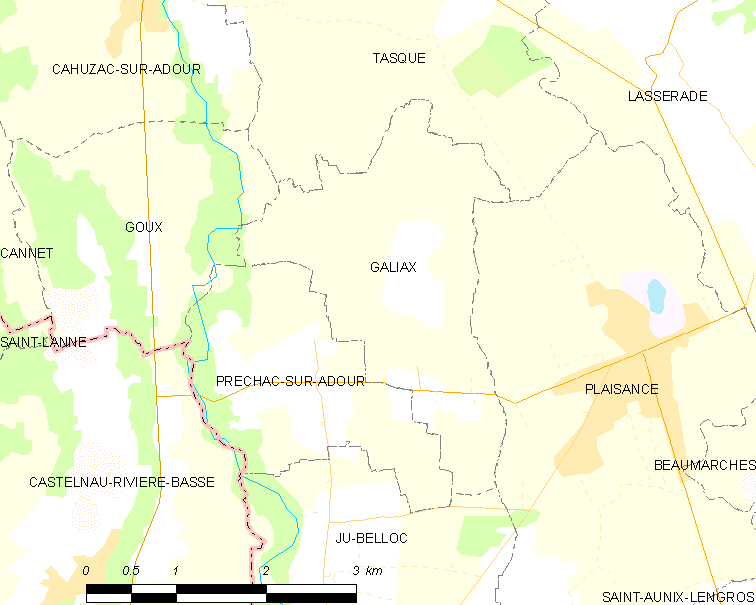
Galiax and its surrounding communes

== Population ==
Historical population
Year	Pop.	±% p.a.
1968	116	—
1975	144	+3.14%
1982	178	+3.07%
1990	186	+0.55%
1999	189	+0.18%
2007	170	−1.32%
2012	172	+0.23%
2017	161	−1.31%
2023	186	+2.43%
Source: INSEE

== See also ==
- Communes of the Gers department
