= Mouchès =

- Commune
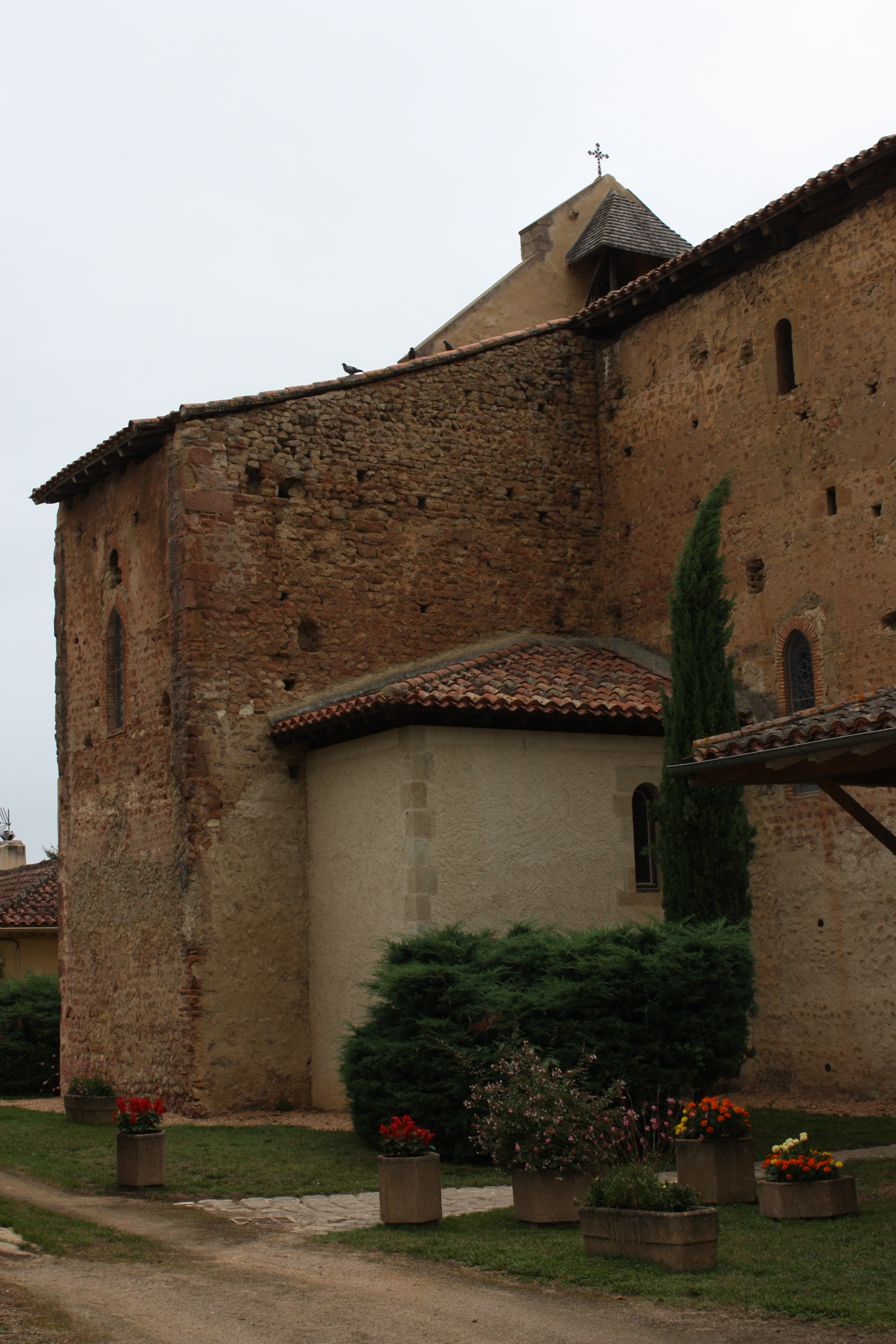
- The church in Mouchès
- Location of Mouchès
- Location within France Location within Occitanie
- Coordinates: 43°33′33″N 0°24′47″E
- Country: France
- Region: Occitania
- Department: Gers
- Arrondissement: Mirande
- Canton: Pardiac-Rivière-Basse
- Intercommunality: Cœur d'Astarac en Gascogne

Government
  - Mayor (2020–2026): Bruno Libaros
- Area^{1}: 3.07 km^{2} (1.19 sq mi)
- Elevation: 142 m (466 ft)
- Highest elevation: 231 m (758 ft)
- Lowest elevation: 137 m (449 ft)
- Population (2023): 82
  - Density: 27/km^{2} (69/sq mi)
- Time zone: UTC+01:00 (CET)
  - Summer (DST): UTC+02:00 (CEST)
- INSEE/Postal code: 32293 /32300
- ^{1} French Land Register data, which excludes lakes, ponds, glaciers > 1 km^{2} (0.386 sq mi or 247 acres) and river estuaries.

Mouchès (French pronunciation: [muʃɛs]; Occitan: Moishers) is a commune in the Gers department in southwestern France.

== Geography ==
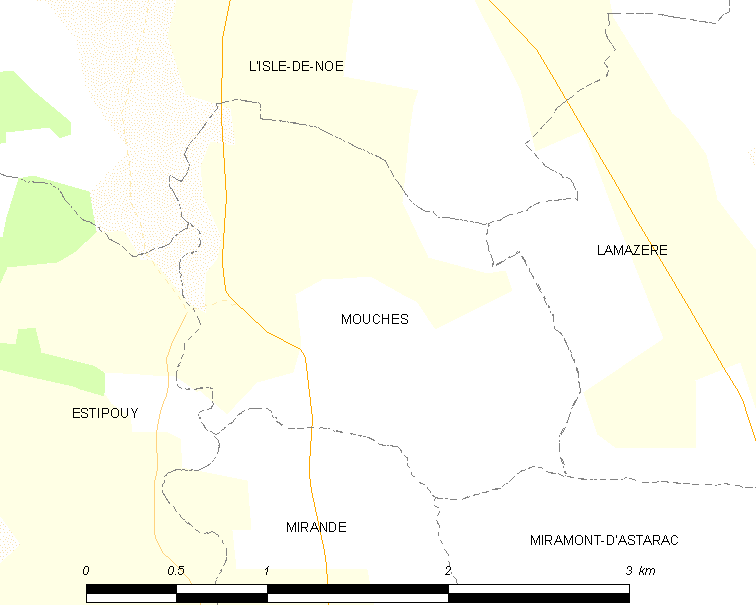
Mouchès and its surrounding communes

== Population ==
Historical population
| Year | Pop. | ±% p.a. |
|---|---|---|
| 1968 | 99 | — |
| 1975 | 75 | −3.89% |
| 1982 | 72 | −0.58% |
| 1990 | 78 | +1.01% |
| 1999 | 73 | −0.73% |
| 2007 | 77 | +0.67% |
| 2012 | 74 | −0.79% |
| 2017 | 75 | +0.27% |
| 2023 | 82 | +1.50% |
Source: INSEE

== See also ==
- Communes of the Gers department
