= Monlezun =

- Commune
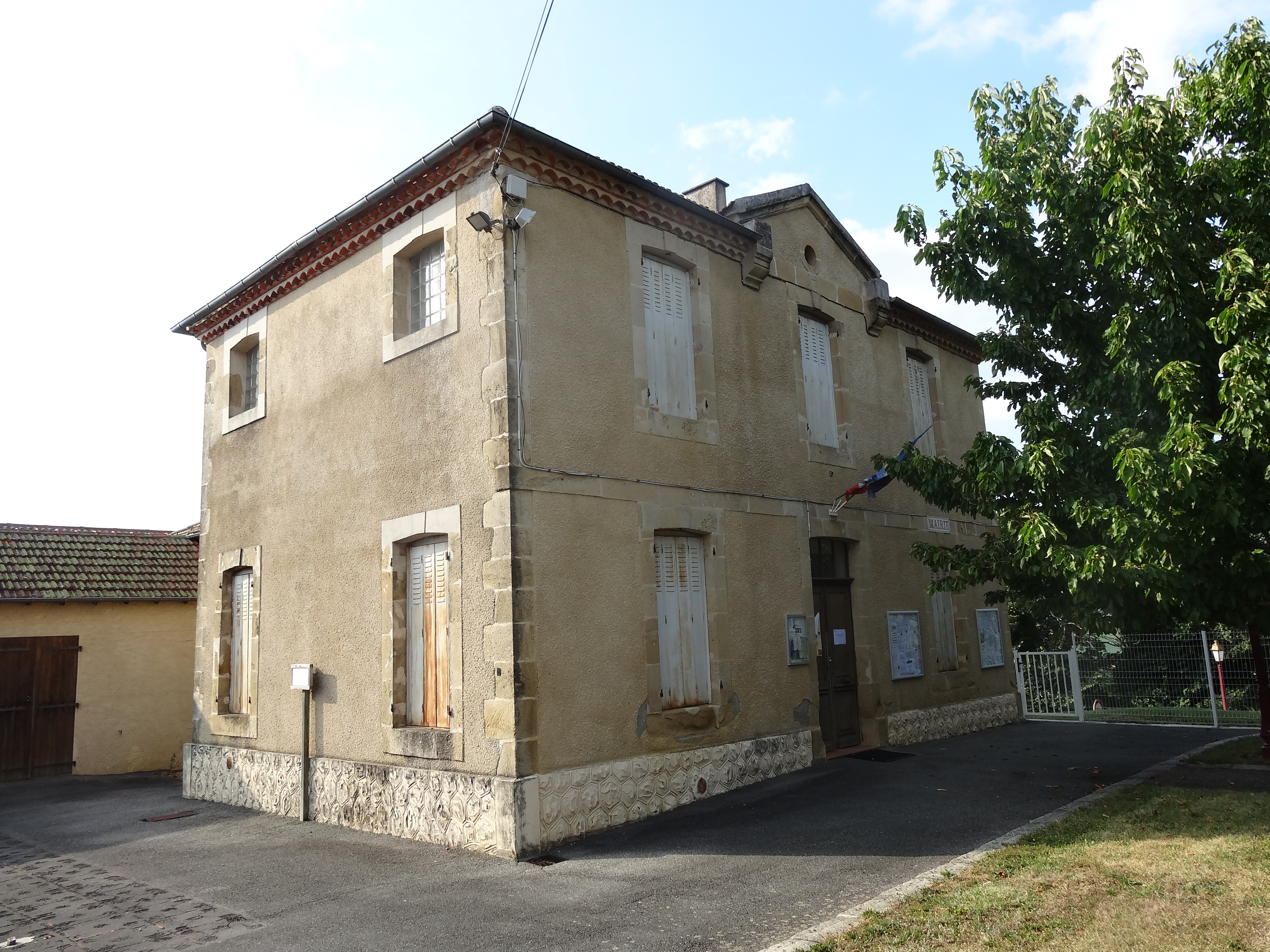
- The town hall in Monlezun
- Location of Monlezun
- Location within France Location within Occitanie
- Coordinates: 43°30′03″N 0°12′50″E
- Country: France
- Region: Occitania
- Department: Gers
- Arrondissement: Mirande
- Canton: Pardiac-Rivière-Basse
- Intercommunality: Bastides et vallons du Gers

Government
  - Mayor (2023–2026): Patricia Pascal
- Area^{1}: 17.35 km^{2} (6.70 sq mi)
- Elevation: 252 m (827 ft)
- Highest elevation: 260 m (850 ft)
- Lowest elevation: 155 m (509 ft)
- Population (2023): 157
  - Density: 9.05/km^{2} (23.4/sq mi)
- Time zone: UTC+01:00 (CET)
  - Summer (DST): UTC+02:00 (CEST)
- INSEE/Postal code: 32273 /32230
- ^{1} French Land Register data, which excludes lakes, ponds, glaciers > 1 km^{2} (0.386 sq mi or 247 acres) and river estuaries.

Monlezun (French pronunciation: [mɔ̃ləzœ̃]; Occitan: Montlesun) is a commune in the Gers department in southwestern France.

== Geography ==
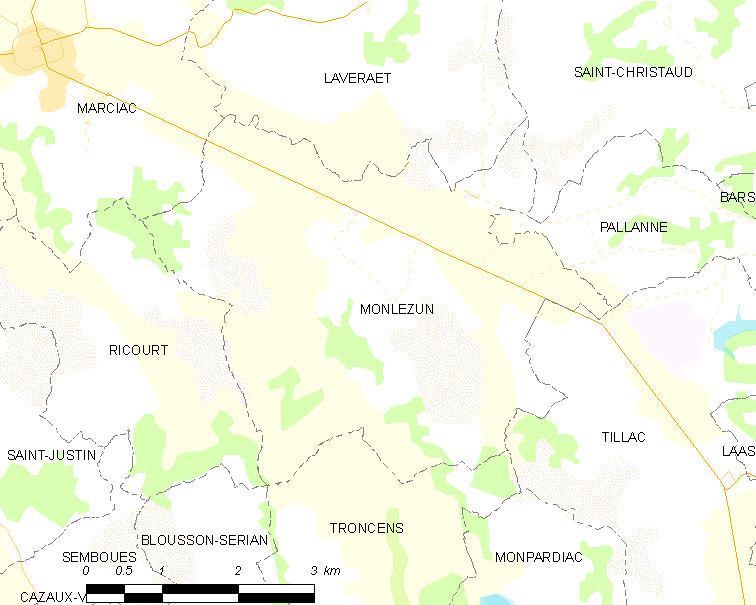
Monlezun and its surrounding communes

== Population ==
Historical population
Year	Pop.	±% p.a.
1968	218	—
1975	179	−2.78%
1982	195	+1.23%
1990	199	+0.25%
1999	189	−0.57%
2007	207	+1.14%
2012	202	−0.49%
2017	199	−0.30%
2023	157	−3.87%
Source: INSEE

== See also ==
- Communes of the Gers department
