= Canton of Pardiac-Rivière-Basse =

Coordinates: 43.60°N 0.05°E

Pardiac-Rivière-Basse
- Canton
- Interactive map of Pardiac-Rivière-Basse
- Country: France
- Region: Occitania
- Department: Gers
- No. of communes: {{{nbcomm}}}

Government
  - Representatives (2021–2028): Nathalie Barrouillet; Gérard Castet
- Area: 502.19 km^{2} (193.90 sq mi)
- Population (2023): 9,459
  - Density: 18.84/km^{2} (48.78/sq mi)
- INSEE code: 32 16

The canton of Pardiac-Rivière-Basse is an administrative division of the Gers department, southwestern France. It was created at the French canton reorganisation which came into effect in March 2015. Its seat is in Plaisance.

== Composition ==
It consists of the following communes:

1. Armentieux
2. Armous-et-Cau
3. Bars
4. Bassoues
5. Beaumarchés
6. Blousson-Sérian
7. Castelnau-d'Anglès
8. Cazaux-Villecomtal
9. Couloumé-Mondebat
10. Courties
11. Estipouy
12. Galiax
13. L'Isle-de-Noé
14. Izotges
15. Jû-Belloc
16. Juillac
17. Ladevèze-Rivière
18. Ladevèze-Ville
19. Lasserrade
20. Laveraët
21. Louslitges
22. Marciac
23. Mascaras
24. Monclar-sur-Losse
25. Monlezun
26. Monpardiac
27. Montesquiou
28. Mouchès
29. Pallanne
30. Plaisance
31. Pouylebon
32. Préchac-sur-Adour
33. Ricourt
34. Saint-Aunix-Lengros
35. Saint-Christaud
36. Saint-Justin
37. Scieurac-et-Flourès
38. Sembouès
39. Tasque
40. Tieste-Uragnoux
41. Tillac
42. Tourdun
43. Troncens

== Councillors ==
Election	Councillors	Party	Occupation
2015	Nathalie Barrouillet	PS	Director of the tourist office Bastides and Vallons du Gers
2015	Gérard Castet	MRC	Mayor of Beaumarchés

== Pictures of the canton ==
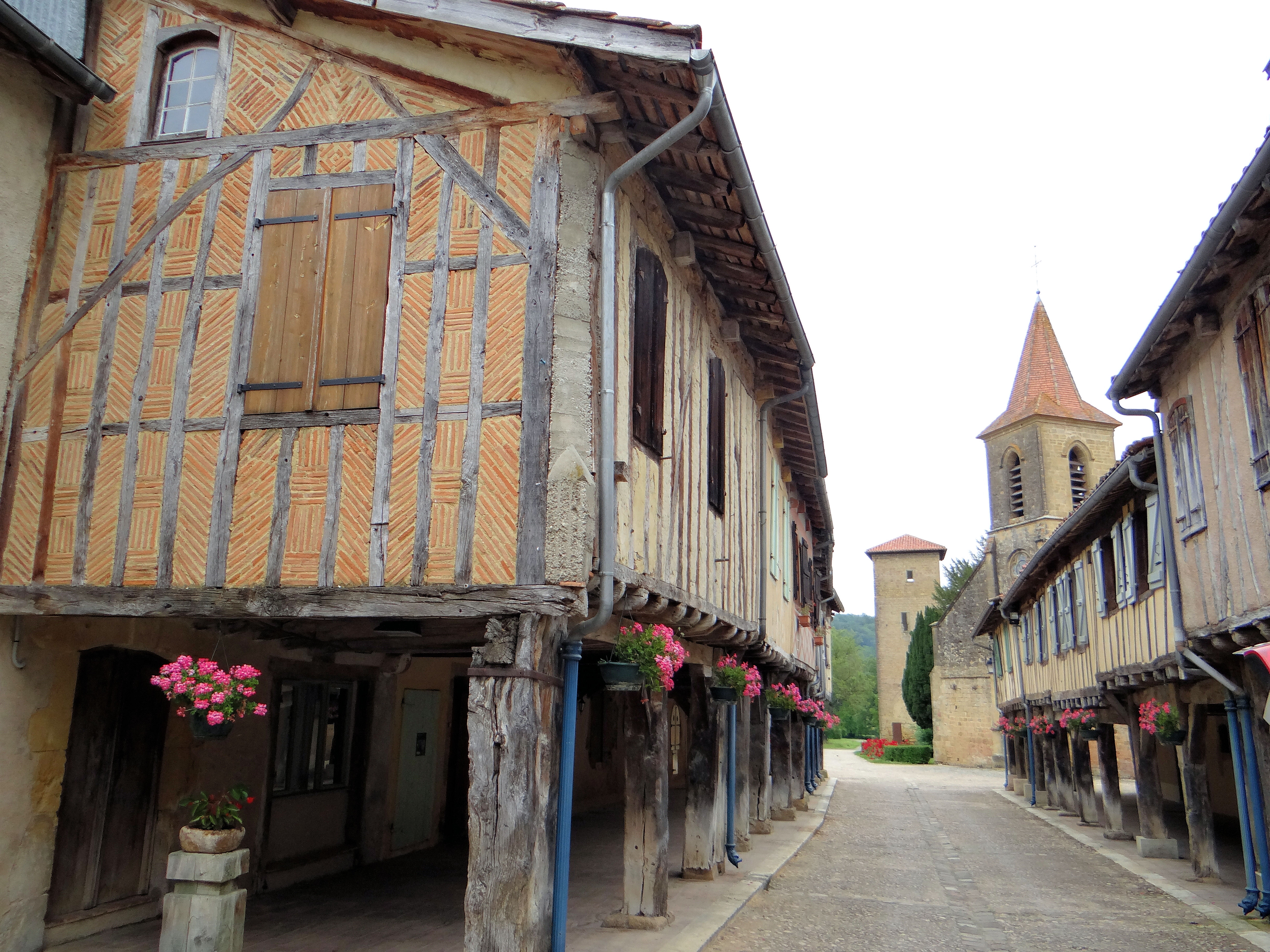
Street of Tillac

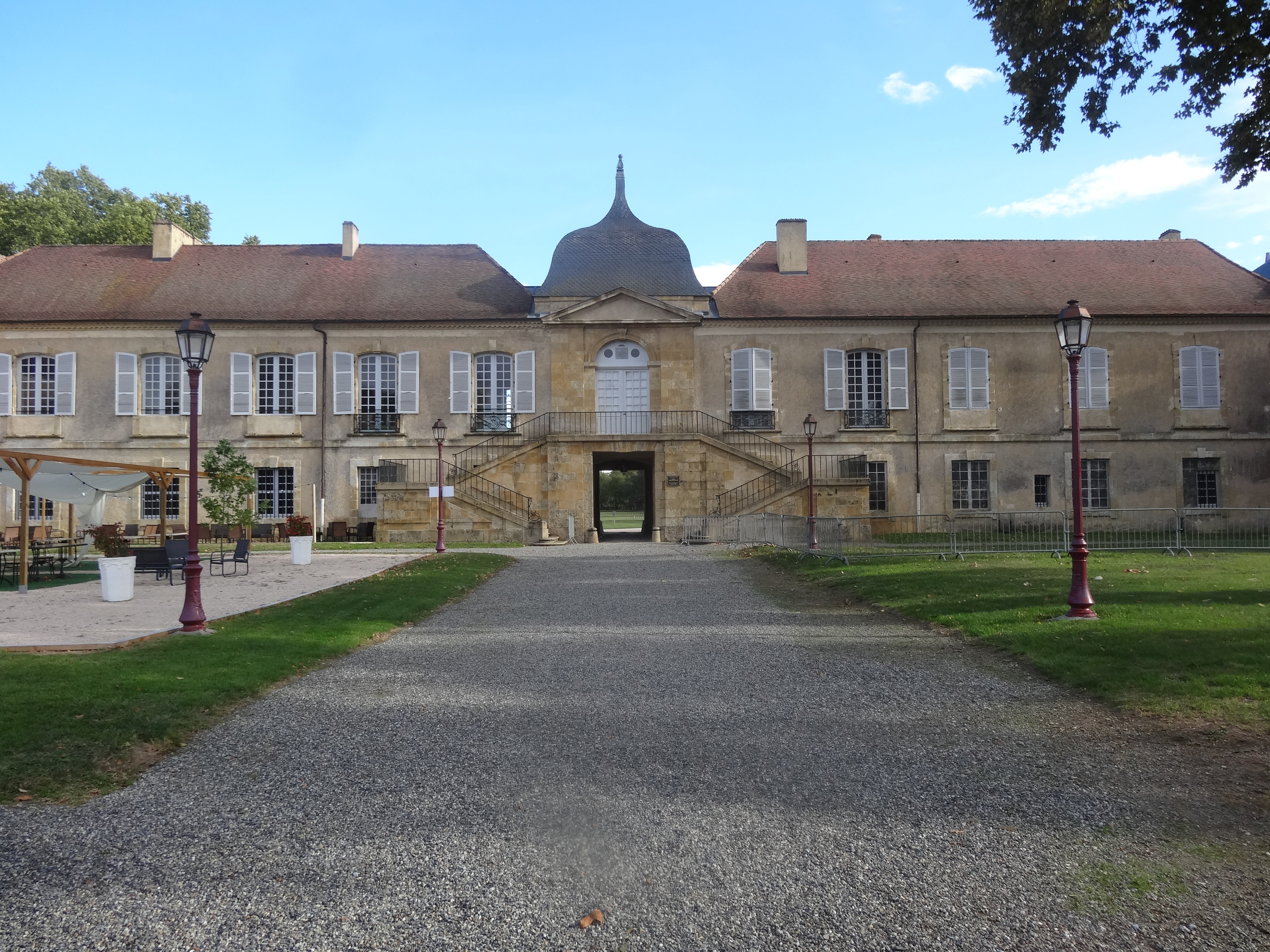
Castle of L'Isle-de-Noé

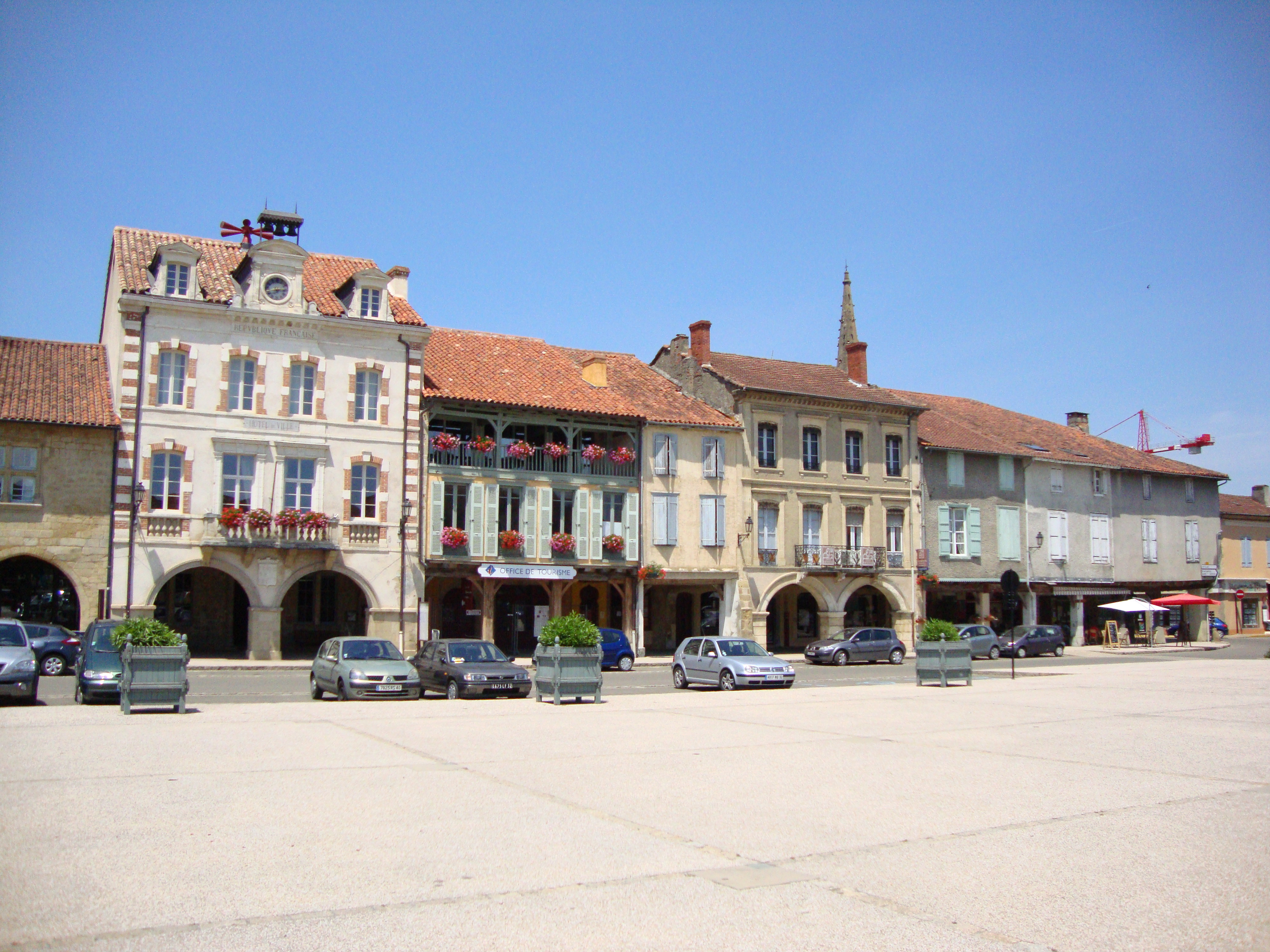
Marciac Central place
