= Sembouès =

- Commune
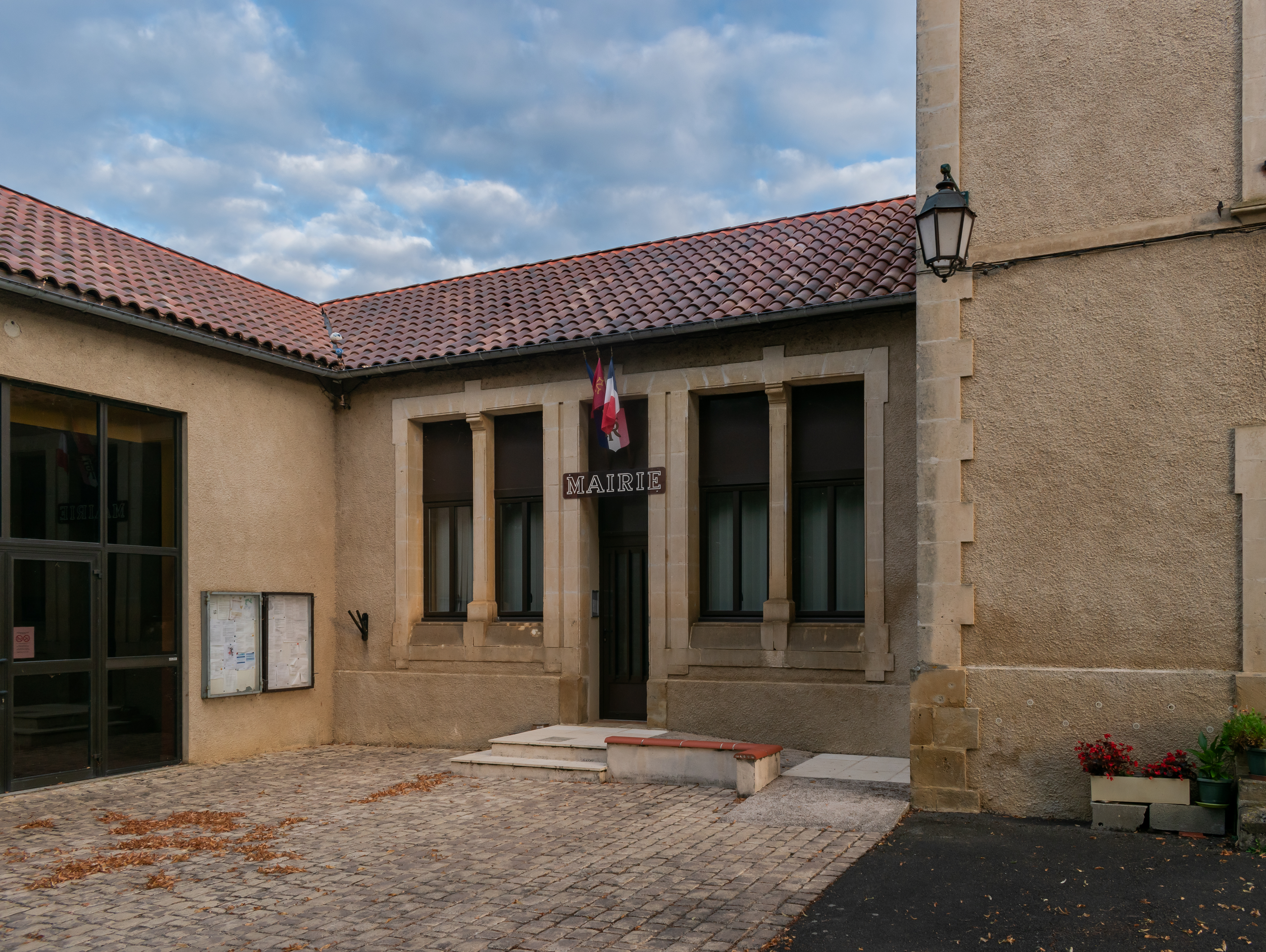
- Town hall of Semboues
- Location of Sembouès
- Location within France Location within Occitanie
- Coordinates: 43°27′40″N 0°09′56″E
- Country: France
- Region: Occitania
- Department: Gers
- Arrondissement: Mirande
- Canton: Pardiac-Rivière-Basse
- Intercommunality: Bastides et vallons du Gers

Government
  - Mayor (2020–2026): Alain Bertin
- Area^{1}: 2.65 km^{2} (1.02 sq mi)
- Elevation: 200 m (660 ft)
- Highest elevation: 272 m (892 ft)
- Lowest elevation: 157 m (515 ft)
- Population (2023): 58
  - Density: 22/km^{2} (57/sq mi)
- Time zone: UTC+01:00 (CET)
  - Summer (DST): UTC+02:00 (CEST)
- INSEE/Postal code: 32427 /32230
- ^{1} French Land Register data, which excludes lakes, ponds, glaciers > 1 km^{2} (0.386 sq mi or 247 acres) and river estuaries.

Sembouès is a commune in the Gers department in southwestern France.

== Geography ==
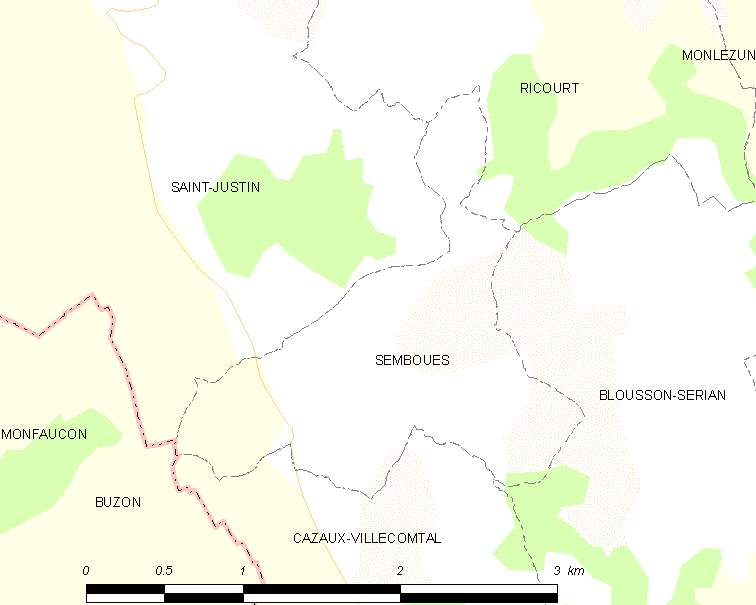
Sembouès and its surrounding communes

== Population ==
Historical population
Year	Pop.	±% p.a.
1968	48	—
1975	67	+4.88%
1982	69	+0.42%
1990	62	−1.33%
1999	56	−1.12%
2007	62	+1.28%
2012	62	+0.00%
2017	60	−0.65%
2023	58	−0.56%
Source: INSEE

== See also ==
- Communes of the Gers department
