= Louslitges =

- Commune
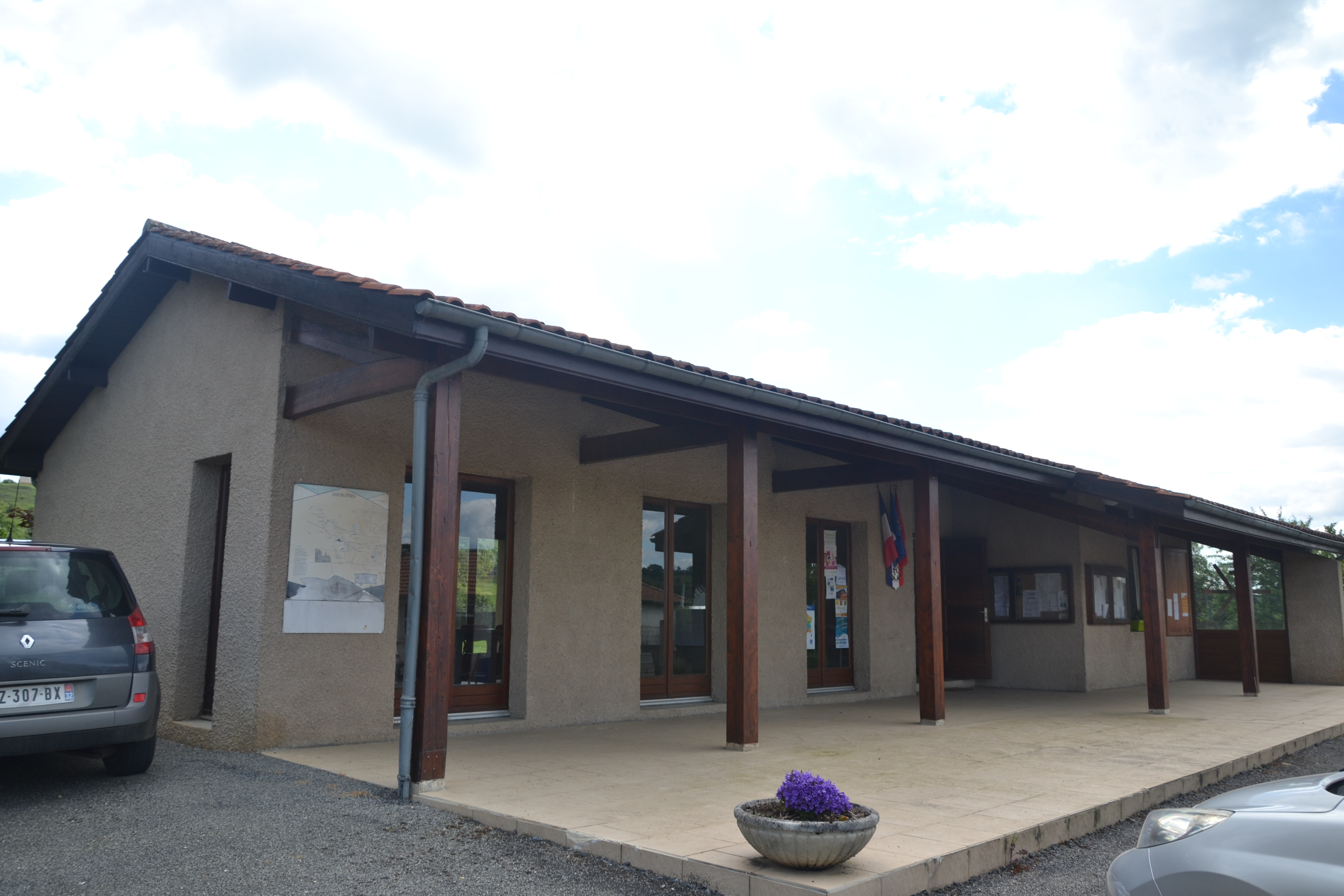
- The town hall in Louslitges
- Location of Louslitges
- Location within France Location within Occitanie
- Coordinates: 43°35′46″N 0°09′55″E
- Country: France
- Region: Occitania
- Department: Gers
- Arrondissement: Mirande
- Canton: Pardiac-Rivière-Basse

Government
  - Mayor (2020–2026): Jean-Luc Drussel
- Area^{1}: 12.03 km^{2} (4.64 sq mi)
- Elevation: 200 m (660 ft)
- Highest elevation: 270 m (890 ft)
- Lowest elevation: 145 m (476 ft)
- Population (2023): 63
  - Density: 5.2/km^{2} (14/sq mi)
- Time zone: UTC+01:00 (CET)
  - Summer (DST): UTC+02:00 (CEST)
- INSEE/Postal code: 32217 /32230
- ^{1} French Land Register data, which excludes lakes, ponds, glaciers > 1 km^{2} (0.386 sq mi or 247 acres) and river estuaries.

Louslitges (French pronunciation: [luslitʒ]; Occitan: Los Litges) is a commune in the Gers department in southwestern France.

== Geography ==
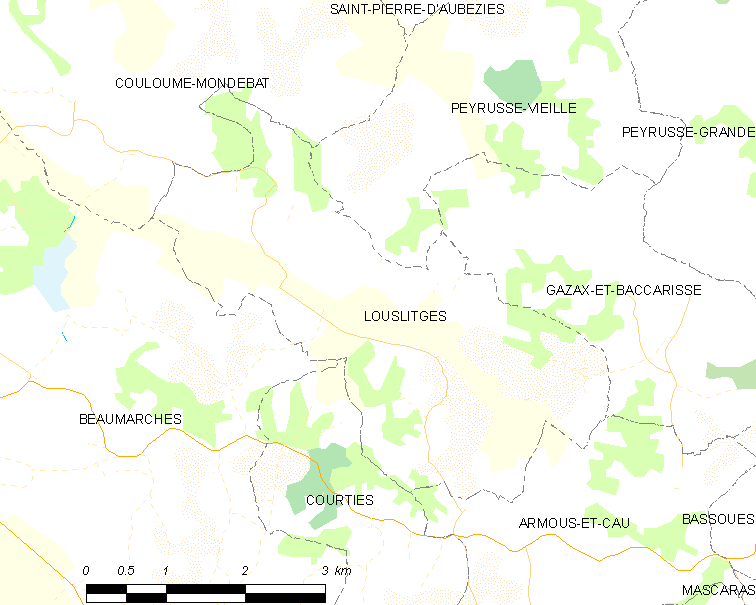
Louslitges and its surrounding communes

== Population ==
Historical population
Year	Pop.	±% p.a.
1968	129	—
1975	97	−3.99%
1982	83	−2.20%
1990	87	+0.59%
1999	84	−0.39%
2007	81	−0.45%
2012	82	+0.25%
2017	67	−3.96%
2023	63	−1.02%
Source: INSEE

== Transportation ==
There are four airports close to Louslitges: Lourdes (47 km), Pau (53 km), Toulouse (96 km), and Biarritz (137 km).

== See also ==
- Communes of the Gers department
