= Juillac, Gers =

Juillac
- Commune
- Coat of arms
- Location of Juillac
- Location within France Location within Occitanie
- Coordinates: 43°32′38″N 0°07′41″E
- Country: France
- Region: Occitania
- Department: Gers
- Arrondissement: Mirande
- Canton: Pardiac-Rivière-Basse
- Intercommunality: Bastides et vallons du Gers

Government
  - Mayor (2020–2026): Hélène de Resseguier
- Area^{1}: 7.49 km^{2} (2.89 sq mi)
- Elevation: 215 m (705 ft)
- Highest elevation: 226 m (741 ft)
- Lowest elevation: 136 m (446 ft)
- Population (2023): 116
  - Density: 15.5/km^{2} (40.1/sq mi)
- Time zone: UTC+01:00 (CET)
  - Summer (DST): UTC+02:00 (CEST)
- INSEE/Postal code: 32164 /32230
- ^{1} French Land Register data, which excludes lakes, ponds, glaciers > 1 km^{2} (0.386 sq mi or 247 acres) and river estuaries.

Juillac (French pronunciation: [ʒɥijak]; Occitan: Julhac) is a commune in the Gers department in southwestern France.

== Geography ==
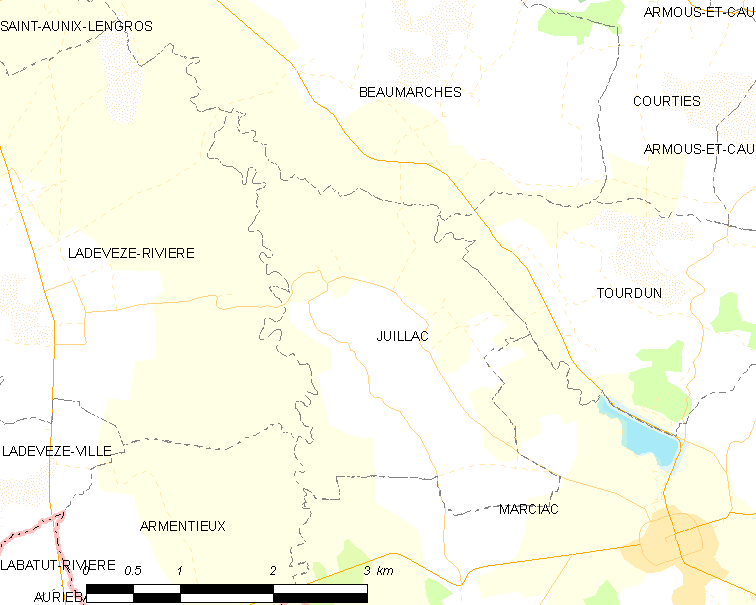
Juillac and its surrounding communes

== Population ==
Historical population
Year	Pop.	±% p.a.
1968	130	—
1975	119	−1.26%
1982	139	+2.24%
1990	134	−0.46%
1999	121	−1.13%
2007	115	−0.63%
2012	124	+1.52%
2017	121	−0.49%
2023	116	−0.70%
Source: INSEE

== See also ==
- Communes of the Gers department
