= Saint-Christaud, Gers =

Saint-Christaud
- Commune
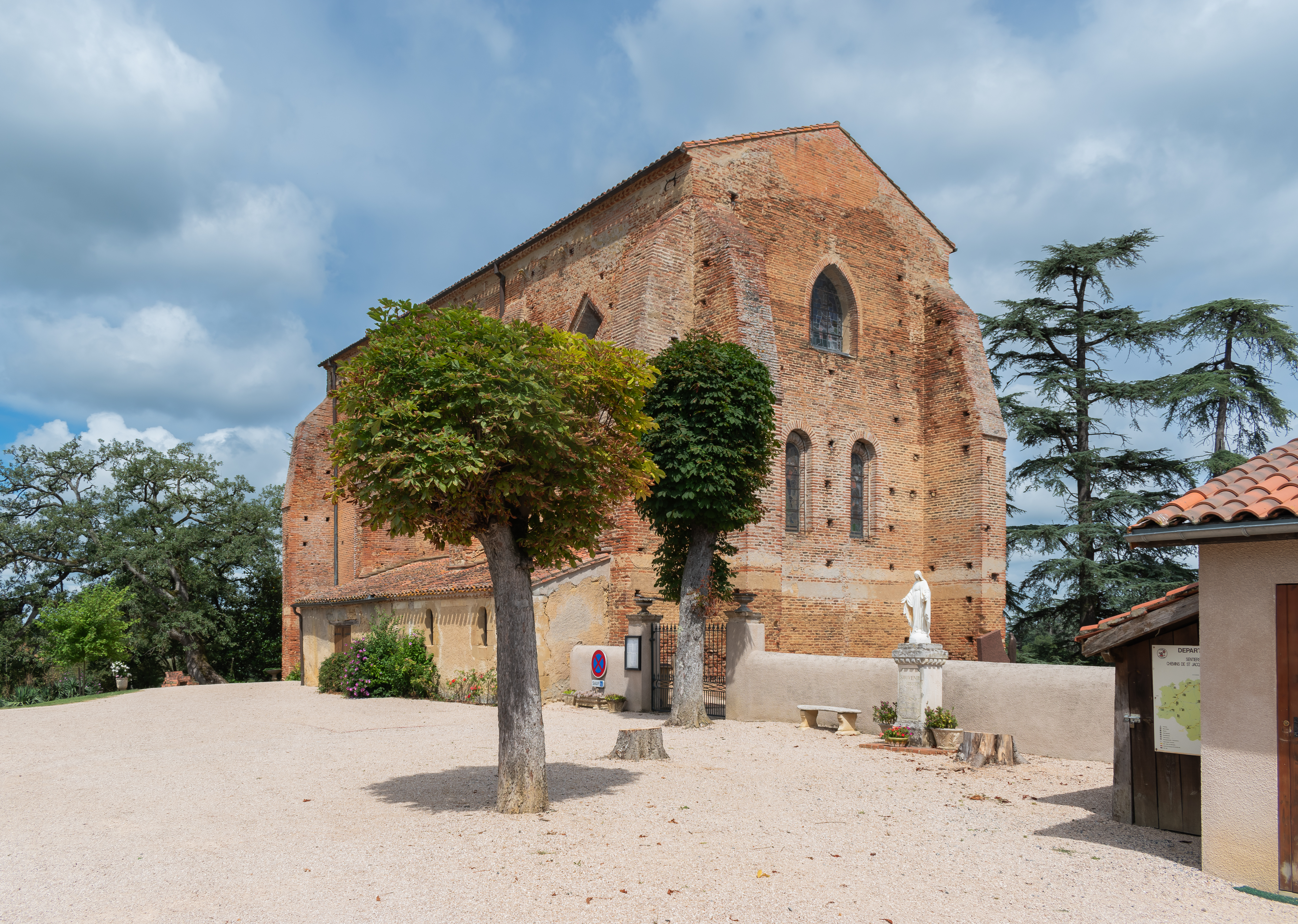
- The church in Saint-Christaud
- Location of Saint-Christaud
- Location within France Location within Occitanie
- Coordinates: 43°31′51″N 0°15′50″E
- Country: France
- Region: Occitania
- Department: Gers
- Arrondissement: Mirande
- Canton: Pardiac-Rivière-Basse
- Intercommunality: Cœur d'Astarac en Gascogne

Government
  - Mayor (2020–2026): Claude Desangles
- Area^{1}: 11 km^{2} (4.2 sq mi)
- Elevation: 200 m (660 ft)
- Highest elevation: 291 m (955 ft)
- Lowest elevation: 169 m (554 ft)
- Population (2023): 64
  - Density: 5.8/km^{2} (15/sq mi)
- Time zone: UTC+01:00 (CET)
  - Summer (DST): UTC+02:00 (CEST)
- INSEE/Postal code: 32367 /32320
- ^{1} French Land Register data, which excludes lakes, ponds, glaciers > 1 km^{2} (0.386 sq mi or 247 acres) and river estuaries.

Saint-Christaud (French pronunciation: [sɛ̃ kʁisto]; Gascon: Sent Cristau) is a commune in the Gers department in southwestern France.

== Geography ==
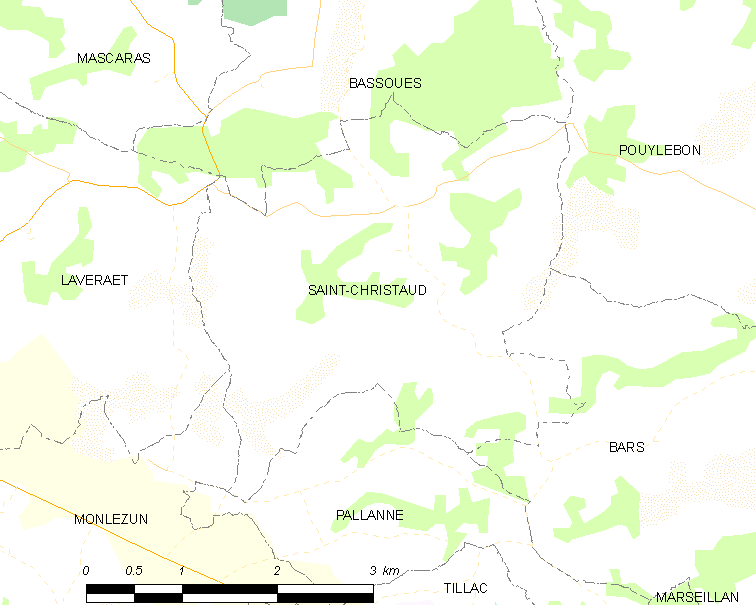
Saint-Christaud and its surrounding communes

== Population ==
Historical population
Year	Pop.	±% p.a.
1968	136	—
1975	130	−0.64%
1982	100	−3.68%
1990	112	+1.43%
1999	90	−2.40%
2007	77	−1.93%
2012	70	−1.89%
2017	65	−1.47%
2023	64	−0.26%
Source: INSEE

== See also ==
- Communes of the Gers department
