= Puységur =

Puységur or Puysegur may refer to:

Places

- Puységur, Gers is a commune in the département of Gers, France
- Puysegur Point, South Island, New Zealand
- Puysegur Trench, an ocean trench off the New Zealand coast

People

- Jacques François de Chastenet de Puységur (1656-1743), Marshal of France
- Louis Pierre de Chastenet de Puységur (1727-1807), French soldier
- Jean Auguste de Chastenet de Puységur (1740-1815), French bishop
- Armand Marie Jacques de Chastenet de Puységur (1751-1825), artillery officer, theoretician on animal magnetism
- Edmond Puységur, 20th century French writer
