= Saint-Créac =

Saint-Créac may refer to the following places in France:

- Saint-Créac, Gers, a commune in the Gers department
- Saint-Créac, Hautes-Pyrénées, a commune in the Hautes-Pyrénées department
