= La Sauvetat =

La Sauvetat may refer to the following places in France:

- La Sauvetat, Gers, a commune in the Gers department
- La Sauvetat, Puy-de-Dôme, a commune in the Puy-de-Dôme department
- La Sauvetat-du-Dropt, a commune in the Lot-et-Garonne department
