= Saint-Léonard, Gers =

Saint-Léonard
- Commune
- Location of Saint-Léonard
- Location within France Location within Occitanie
- Coordinates: 43°51′35″N 0°46′11″E
- Country: France
- Region: Occitania
- Department: Gers
- Arrondissement: Condom
- Canton: Fleurance-Lomagne

Government
  - Mayor (2020–2026): Gervais Molas
- Area^{1}: 13.11 km^{2} (5.06 sq mi)
- Elevation: 192 m (630 ft)
- Highest elevation: 192 m (630 ft)
- Lowest elevation: 96 m (315 ft)
- Population (2023): 184
  - Density: 14.0/km^{2} (36.4/sq mi)
- Time zone: UTC+01:00 (CET)
  - Summer (DST): UTC+02:00 (CEST)
- INSEE/Postal code: 32385 /32380
- ^{1} French Land Register data, which excludes lakes, ponds, glaciers > 1 km^{2} (0.386 sq mi or 247 acres) and river estuaries.

Saint-Léonard (French pronunciation: [sɛ̃ leɔnaʁ]; Occitan: Sent Launart) is a commune in the Gers department in southwestern France.

== Geography ==
The river Auroue forms all of the commune's western border.

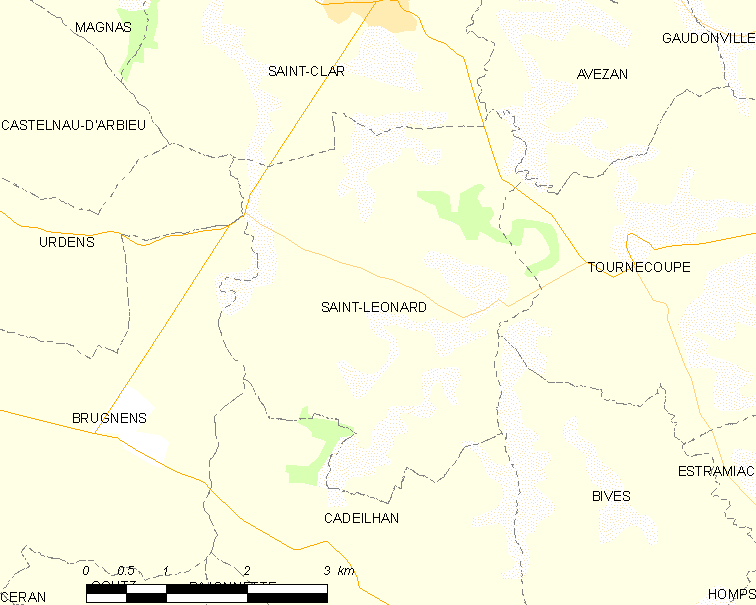
Saint-Léonard and its surrounding communes

== Population ==
Historical population
Year	Pop.	±% p.a.
1968	208	—
1975	190	−1.28%
1982	179	−0.85%
1990	161	−1.32%
1999	143	−1.31%
2007	167	+1.96%
2012	182	+1.74%
2017	182	+0.00%
2023	184	+0.18%
Source: INSEE

== See also ==
- Communes of the Gers department
