= Miramont-Latour =

- Commune
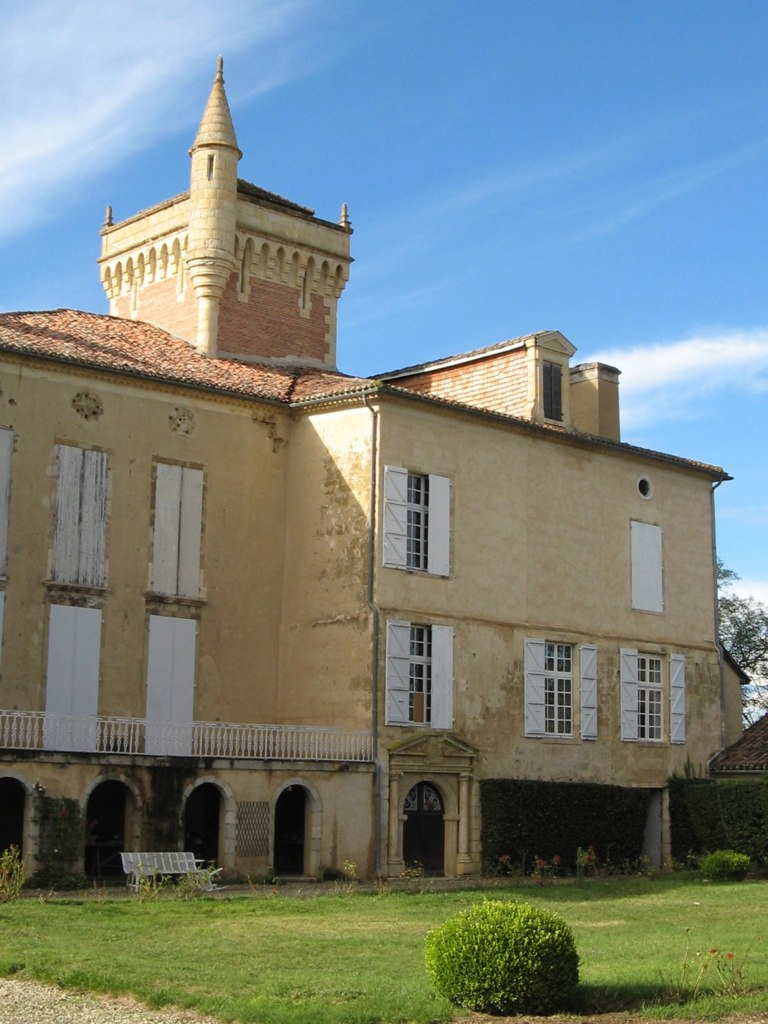
- Chateau
- Location of Miramont-Latour
- Location within France Location within Occitanie
- Coordinates: 43°46′30″N 0°41′01″E
- Country: France
- Region: Occitania
- Department: Gers
- Arrondissement: Condom
- Canton: Fleurance-Lomagne
- Intercommunality: Lomagne Gersoise

Government
  - Mayor (2020–2026): Jessica Darroux
- Area^{1}: 9.77 km^{2} (3.77 sq mi)
- Elevation: 265 m (869 ft)
- Highest elevation: 202 m (663 ft)
- Lowest elevation: 105 m (344 ft)
- Population (2023): 141
  - Density: 14.4/km^{2} (37.4/sq mi)
- Time zone: UTC+01:00 (CET)
  - Summer (DST): UTC+02:00 (CEST)
- INSEE/Postal code: 32255 /32390
- ^{1} French Land Register data, which excludes lakes, ponds, glaciers > 1 km^{2} (0.386 sq mi or 247 acres) and river estuaries.

Miramont-Latour (French pronunciation: [miʁamɔ̃ latuʁ]; Occitan: Miramont e La Tor) is a commune in the Gers department in southwestern France.

== Geography ==
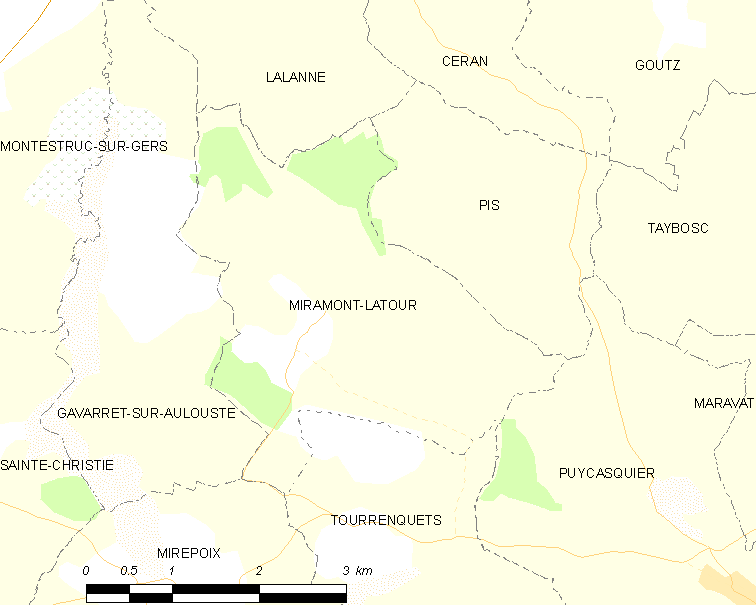
Miramont-Latour and its surrounding communes

The river Auroue forms part of the commune's eastern border.

== Population ==
Historical population
Year	Pop.	±% p.a.
1968	167	—
1975	122	−4.39%
1982	112	−1.21%
1990	125	+1.38%
1999	136	+0.94%
2007	151	+1.32%
2012	156	+0.65%
2017	163	+0.88%
2023	141	−2.39%
Source: INSEE

== See also ==
- Communes of the Gers department
