= Saint-Martin-d'Armagnac =

- Commune
- Location of Saint-Martin-d'Armagnac
- Location within France Location within Occitanie
- Coordinates: 43°42′53″N 0°03′43″W
- Country: France
- Region: Occitania
- Department: Gers
- Arrondissement: Condom
- Canton: Grand-Bas-Armagnac
- Intercommunality: Bas-Armagnac

Government
  - Mayor (2020–2026): Eric Artigole
- Area^{1}: 10.8 km^{2} (4.2 sq mi)
- Elevation: 150 m (490 ft)
- Highest elevation: 175 m (574 ft)
- Lowest elevation: 97 m (318 ft)
- Population (2023): 230
  - Density: 21/km^{2} (55/sq mi)
- Time zone: UTC+01:00 (CET)
  - Summer (DST): UTC+02:00 (CEST)
- INSEE/Postal code: 32390 /32110
- ^{1} French Land Register data, which excludes lakes, ponds, glaciers > 1 km^{2} (0.386 sq mi or 247 acres) and river estuaries.

Saint-Martin-d'Armagnac (French pronunciation: [sɛ̃ maʁtɛ̃ daʁmaɲak], literally Saint-Martin of Armagnac; Occitan: Sent Martin d'Armanhac) is a commune in the Gers department in southwestern France.

== Geography ==
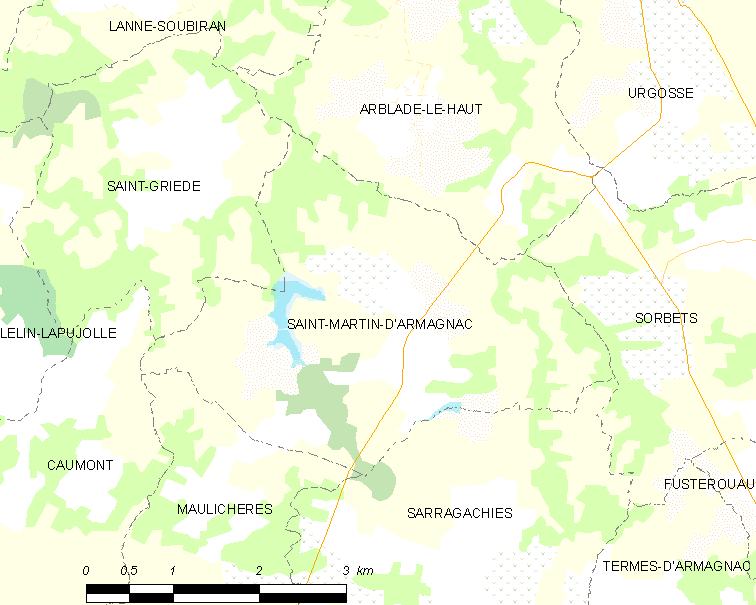
Saint-Martin-d'Armagnac and its surrounding communes

== Population ==
Historical population
Year	Pop.	±% p.a.
1968	212	—
1975	217	+0.33%
1982	220	+0.20%
1990	205	−0.88%
1999	205	+0.00%
2007	211	+0.36%
2012	228	+1.56%
2017	247	+1.61%
2023	230	−1.18%
Source: INSEE

== See also ==
- Communes of the Gers department
