= Magnas =

- Commune
- Location of Magnas
- Location within France Location within Occitanie
- Coordinates: 43°53′44″N 0°43′52″E
- Country: France
- Region: Occitania
- Department: Gers
- Arrondissement: Condom
- Canton: Fleurance-Lomagne

Government
  - Mayor (2020–2026): Philippe de Galard
- Area^{1}: 3.19 km^{2} (1.23 sq mi)
- Elevation: 196 m (643 ft)
- Highest elevation: 207 m (679 ft)
- Lowest elevation: 124 m (407 ft)
- Population (2023): 56
  - Density: 18/km^{2} (45/sq mi)
- Time zone: UTC+01:00 (CET)
  - Summer (DST): UTC+02:00 (CEST)
- INSEE/Postal code: 32223 /32380
- ^{1} French Land Register data, which excludes lakes, ponds, glaciers > 1 km^{2} (0.386 sq mi or 247 acres) and river estuaries.

Magnas is a commune in the Gers department in southwestern France.

== Geography ==
The river Auroue forms all of the commune's northeastern border.

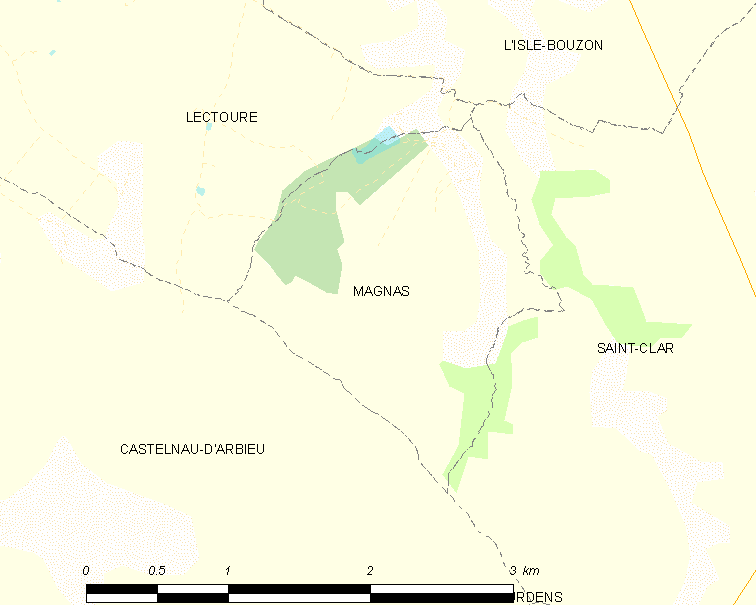
Magnas and its surrounding communes

== Population ==
Historical population
Year	Pop.	±% p.a.
1968	71	—
1975	57	−3.09%
1982	40	−4.93%
1990	61	+5.42%
1999	48	−2.63%
2007	65	+3.86%
2012	73	+2.35%
2017	59	−4.17%
2023	56	−0.87%
Source: INSEE

== See also ==
- Communes of the Gers department
