= Cézan =

- Commune
- Location of Cézan
- Location within France Location within Occitanie
- Coordinates: 43°48′48″N 0°30′01″E
- Country: France
- Region: Occitania
- Department: Gers
- Arrondissement: Condom
- Canton: Fleurance-Lomagne
- Intercommunality: Lomagne Gersoise

Government
  - Mayor (2020–2026): Bernard Sanchez
- Area^{1}: 12.22 km^{2} (4.72 sq mi)
- Elevation: 203 m (666 ft)
- Highest elevation: 231 m (758 ft)
- Lowest elevation: 125 m (410 ft)
- Population (2023): 201
  - Density: 16.4/km^{2} (42.6/sq mi)
- Time zone: UTC+01:00 (CET)
  - Summer (DST): UTC+02:00 (CEST)
- INSEE/Postal code: 32102 /32410
- ^{1} French Land Register data, which excludes lakes, ponds, glaciers > 1 km^{2} (0.386 sq mi or 247 acres) and river estuaries.

Cézan (French pronunciation: [sezɑ̃]; Occitan: Cesan) is a commune in the Gers department in southwestern France.

== Geography ==
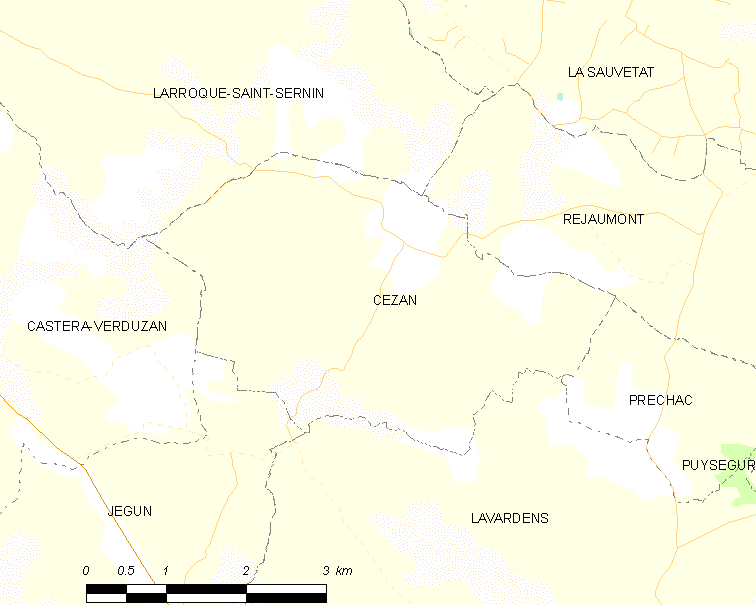
Cézan and its surrounding communes

== Population ==
Historical population
Year	Pop.	±% p.a.
1968	203	—
1975	165	−2.92%
1982	152	−1.17%
1990	158	+0.49%
1999	150	−0.58%
2007	158	+0.65%
2012	177	+2.30%
2017	223	+4.73%
2023	201	−1.72%
Source: INSEE

== See also ==
- Communes of the Gers department
