= Goutz =

- Commune
- Location of Goutz
- Location within France Location within Occitanie
- Coordinates: 43°48′21″N 0°44′06″E
- Country: France
- Region: Occitania
- Department: Gers
- Arrondissement: Condom
- Canton: Fleurance-Lomagne
- Intercommunality: Lomagne Gersoise

Government
  - Mayor (2020–2026): Éric Laborde
- Area^{1}: 8.46 km^{2} (3.27 sq mi)
- Elevation: 172 m (564 ft)
- Highest elevation: 203 m (666 ft)
- Lowest elevation: 127 m (417 ft)
- Population (2023): 212
  - Density: 25.1/km^{2} (64.9/sq mi)
- Time zone: UTC+01:00 (CET)
  - Summer (DST): UTC+02:00 (CEST)
- INSEE/Postal code: 32150 /32500
- ^{1} French Land Register data, which excludes lakes, ponds, glaciers > 1 km^{2} (0.386 sq mi or 247 acres) and river estuaries.

Goutz is a commune in the Gers department in southwestern France.

== Geography ==
The river Petite Auroue forms all of the commune's eastern border, then flows into the Auroue, which flows northeast through the commune and forms part of its southwestern and northern borders.

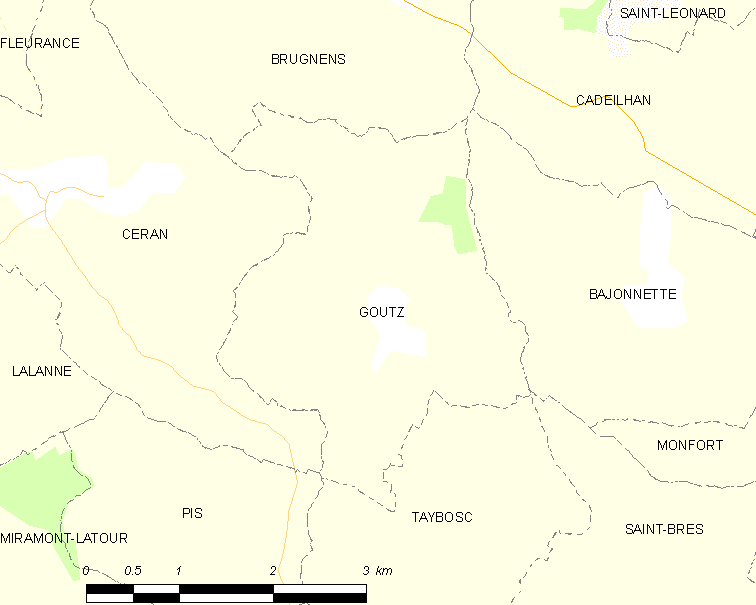
Goutz and its surrounding communes

== Population ==
Historical population
| Year | Pop. | ±% p.a. |
|---|---|---|
| 1968 | 193 | — |
| 1975 | 150 | −3.54% |
| 1982 | 159 | +0.84% |
| 1990 | 151 | −0.64% |
| 1999 | 163 | +0.85% |
| 2007 | 181 | +1.32% |
| 2012 | 187 | +0.65% |
| 2017 | 205 | +1.86% |
| 2023 | 212 | +0.56% |
Source: INSEE

== See also ==
- Communes of the Gers department
