= Sainte-Radegonde, Gers =

Sainte-Radegonde
- Commune
- Location of Sainte-Radegonde
- Location within France Location within Occitanie
- Coordinates: 43°50′24″N 0°35′20″E
- Country: France
- Region: Occitania
- Department: Gers
- Arrondissement: Condom
- Canton: Fleurance-Lomagne
- Intercommunality: Lomagne Gersoise

Government
  - Mayor (2020–2026): Francis Barella
- Area^{1}: 9.82 km^{2} (3.79 sq mi)
- Elevation: 132 m (433 ft)
- Highest elevation: 181 m (594 ft)
- Lowest elevation: 97 m (318 ft)
- Population (2023): 172
  - Density: 17.5/km^{2} (45.4/sq mi)
- Time zone: UTC+01:00 (CET)
  - Summer (DST): UTC+02:00 (CEST)
- INSEE/Postal code: 32405 /32500
- ^{1} French Land Register data, which excludes lakes, ponds, glaciers > 1 km^{2} (0.386 sq mi or 247 acres) and river estuaries.

Sainte-Radegonde (French pronunciation: [sɛ̃t ʁadɡɔ̃d]; Occitan: Senta Regonda) is a commune in the Gers department in southwestern France.

== Geography ==
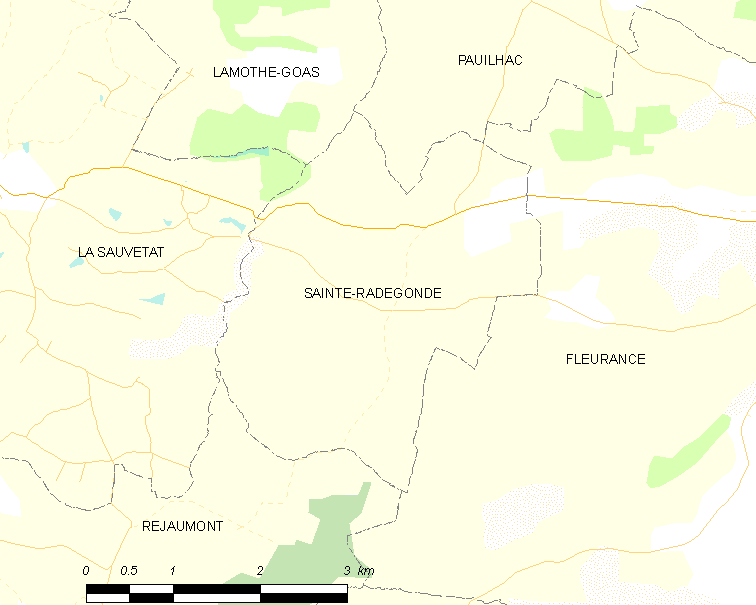
Sainte-Radegonde and its surrounding communes

== Population ==
Historical population
Year	Pop.	±% p.a.
1968	180	—
1975	160	−1.67%
1982	146	−1.30%
1990	155	+0.75%
1999	170	+1.03%
2007	189	+1.33%
2012	182	−0.75%
2017	182	+0.00%
2023	172	−0.94%
Source: INSEE

== See also ==
- Communes of the Gers department
