= Réjaumont, Gers =

Réjaumont
- Commune
- Location of Réjaumont
- Location within France Location within Occitanie
- Coordinates: 43°48′55″N 0°33′05″E
- Country: France
- Region: Occitania
- Department: Gers
- Arrondissement: Condom
- Canton: Fleurance-Lomagne
- Intercommunality: Lomagne Gersoise

Government
  - Mayor (2020–2026): Didier Cartie
- Area^{1}: 13.6 km^{2} (5.3 sq mi)
- Elevation: 100 m (330 ft)
- Highest elevation: 242 m (794 ft)
- Lowest elevation: 118 m (387 ft)
- Population (2023): 246
  - Density: 18.1/km^{2} (46.8/sq mi)
- Time zone: UTC+01:00 (CET)
  - Summer (DST): UTC+02:00 (CEST)
- INSEE/Postal code: 32341 /32390
- ^{1} French Land Register data, which excludes lakes, ponds, glaciers > 1 km^{2} (0.386 sq mi or 247 acres) and river estuaries.

Réjaumont (French pronunciation: [ʁeʒomɔ̃]; Rejaumont in Gascon) is a commune in the Gers département in southwestern France.

== Geography ==
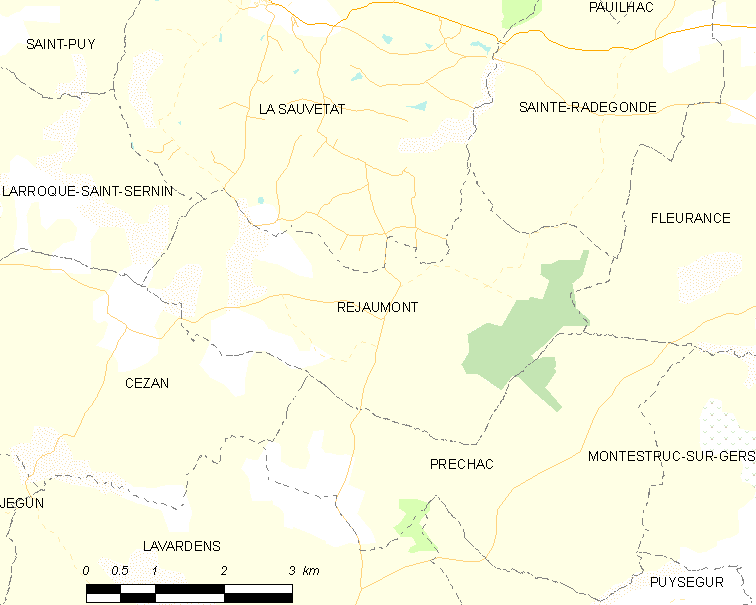
Réjaumont and its surrounding communes

== Population ==
Historical population
| Year | Pop. | ±% p.a. |
|---|---|---|
| 1968 | 204 | — |
| 1975 | 200 | −0.28% |
| 1982 | 185 | −1.11% |
| 1990 | 183 | −0.14% |
| 1999 | 175 | −0.50% |
| 2007 | 179 | +0.28% |
| 2012 | 220 | +4.21% |
| 2017 | 240 | +1.76% |
| 2023 | 246 | +0.41% |
Source: INSEE

== History ==
Réjaumont was, until the abolition of the aristocracy, in the county of Gaure. Circa 1660, Me Durant Dumont, canon of Ste-Marie d'Auch, bequeathed to the community a rent of 30 livres, to be distributed every two years by the consuls, to pay for the wedding of a poor girl or to allow a poor boy to start a business.

== Politics and administration ==
Mayors of Réjaumont
| Period | Name | Party |
|---|---|---|
| 2001–2008 | Alain Reinaudo | |
| 2008–2020 | Patricia Paillarès | DVG |
| 2020–incumbent | Didier Cartie | |

== See also ==
- Communes of the Gers department
