= Manciet =

- Commune
- Coat of arms
- Location of Manciet
- Location within France Location within Occitanie
- Coordinates: 43°48′02″N 0°02′30″E
- Country: France
- Region: Occitania
- Department: Gers
- Arrondissement: Condom
- Canton: Grand-Bas-Armagnac
- Intercommunality: Bas-Armagnac

Government
  - Mayor (2020–2026): Pierre Capdepont
- Area^{1}: 42.11 km^{2} (16.26 sq mi)
- Highest elevation: 212 m (696 ft)
- Lowest elevation: 105 m (344 ft)
- Population (2023): 758
  - Density: 18.0/km^{2} (46.6/sq mi)
- Time zone: UTC+01:00 (CET)
  - Summer (DST): UTC+02:00 (CEST)
- INSEE/Postal code: 32227 /32370
- ^{1} French Land Register data, which excludes lakes, ponds, glaciers > 1 km^{2} (0.386 sq mi or 247 acres) and river estuaries.

Manciet (French pronunciation: [mɑ̃sjɛ]; Gascon: Mansiet) is a commune in the Gers department in southwestern France.

== Geography ==
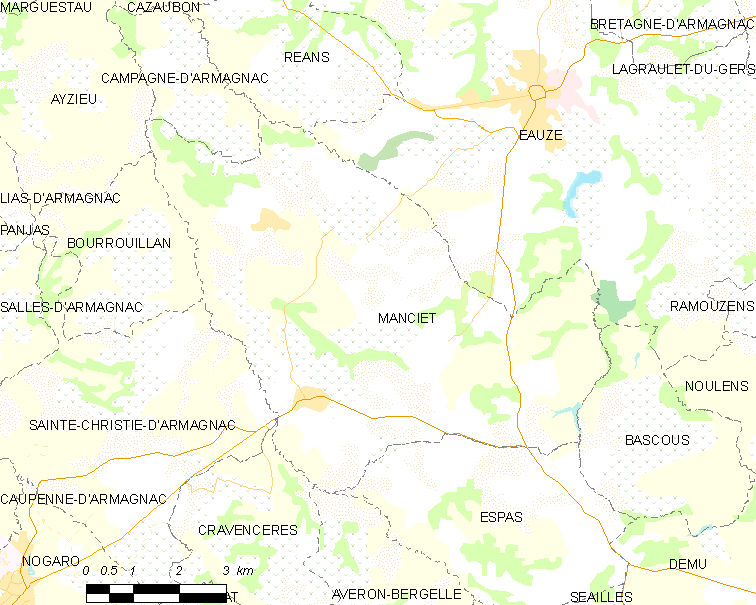
Manciet and its surrounding communes

== Population ==
Historical population
| Year | Pop. | ±% p.a. |
|---|---|---|
| 1968 | 1,066 | — |
| 1975 | 955 | −1.56% |
| 1982 | 857 | −1.53% |
| 1990 | 784 | −1.11% |
| 1999 | 764 | −0.29% |
| 2007 | 793 | +0.47% |
| 2012 | 809 | +0.40% |
| 2017 | 805 | −0.10% |
| 2023 | 758 | −1.00% |
Source: INSEE

== See also ==
- Communes of the Gers department
