= Auroue =

River in France

- Location within France Location within Nouvelle-Aquitaine

Location
- Country: France

Physical characteristics
- Source
  - location: Crastes
  - coordinates: 43°43′38″N 00°44′35″E
  - elevation: 220 m (720 ft)
- Mouth
  - location: Garonne
  - coordinates: 44°08′19″N 00°45′47″E
  - elevation: 45 m (148 ft)
- Length: 62.4 km (38.8 mi)
- Basin size: 200 km^{2} (77 sq mi)
- Discharge
  - average: 0.74 m^{3}/s (26 cu ft/s)

Basin features
- Progression: Garonne→ Gironde estuary→ Atlantic Ocean

The Auroue (French pronunciation: [oʁu]) is a 62.4-kilometre (38.8 mi) long river in the Gers, Lot-et-Garonne and Tarn-et-Garonne départements, south western France. Its source is at Crastes, 15 kilometres (9 mi) northeast of Auch. It flows generally north. It is a left tributary of the Garonne into which it flows between Saint-Sixte and Saint-Nicolas-de-la-Balerme, 13 kilometres (8 mi) southeast of Agen.

== Communes along its course ==
This list is ordered from source to mouth:

- Gers: Crastes, Puycasquier, Miramont-Latour, Pis, Taybosc, Goutz, Céran, Brugnens, Cadeilhan, Saint-Léonard, Urdens, Saint-Clar, Magnas, Lectoure, L'Isle-Bouzon, Plieux, Castet-Arrouy, Miradoux, Gimbrède
- Lot-et-Garonne: Cuq
- Tarn-et-Garonne: Dunes
- Lot-et-Garonne: Caudecoste, Saint-Sixte, Saint-Nicolas-de-la-Balerme
