= Taybosc =

- Commune
- Coat of arms
- Location of Taybosc
- Location within France Location within Occitanie
- Coordinates: 43°47′02″N 0°44′13″E
- Country: France
- Region: Occitania
- Department: Gers
- Arrondissement: Condom
- Canton: Fleurance-Lomagne
- Intercommunality: Lomagne Gersoise

Government
  - Mayor (2020–2026): Laurence Pascale Mares
- Area^{1}: 5.87 km^{2} (2.27 sq mi)
- Elevation: 190 m (620 ft)
- Highest elevation: 224 m (735 ft)
- Lowest elevation: 158 m (518 ft)
- Population (2023): 68
  - Density: 12/km^{2} (30/sq mi)
- Time zone: UTC+01:00 (CET)
  - Summer (DST): UTC+02:00 (CEST)
- INSEE/Postal code: 32441 /32120
- ^{1} French Land Register data, which excludes lakes, ponds, glaciers > 1 km^{2} (0.386 sq mi or 247 acres) and river estuaries.

Taybosc (French pronunciation: [tɛbɔsk]; Occitan: Taibòsc) is a commune in the Gers department in southwestern France.

== Geography ==
=== Localisation ===
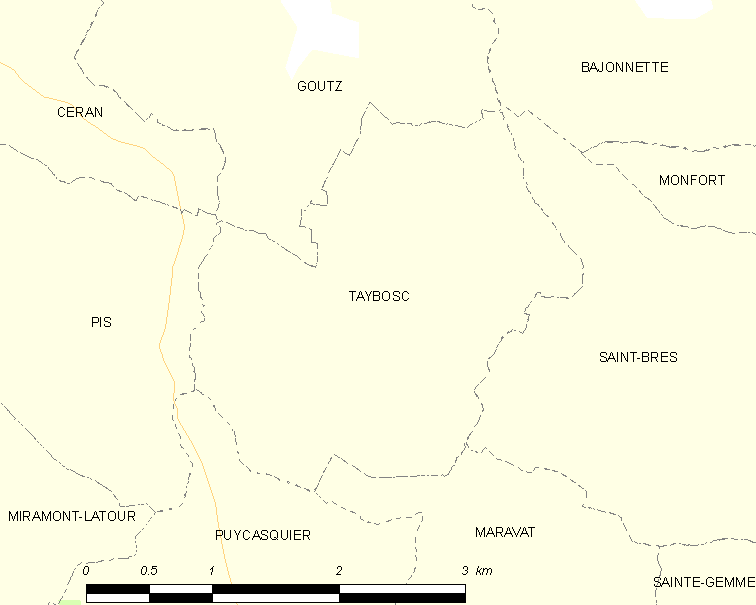
Taybosc and its surrounding communes

=== Hydrography ===
The river Auroue forms most of the commune's western border.

== Population ==
Historical population
Year	Pop.	±% p.a.
1968	66	—
1975	62	−0.89%
1982	59	−0.71%
1990	64	+1.02%
1999	56	−1.47%
2007	53	−0.69%
2012	65	+4.17%
2017	62	−0.94%
2023	68	+1.55%
Source: INSEE

== See also ==
- Communes of the Gers department
