= Lamothe-Goas =

- Commune
- Coat of arms
- Location of Lamothe-Goas
- Location within France Location within Occitanie
- Coordinates: 43°51′56″N 0°33′36″E
- Country: France
- Region: Occitania
- Department: Gers
- Arrondissement: Condom
- Canton: Fleurance-Lomagne
- Intercommunality: Lomagne Gersoise

Government
  - Mayor (2020–2026): Alain Scudellaro
- Area^{1}: 7.18 km^{2} (2.77 sq mi)
- Elevation: 150 m (490 ft)
- Highest elevation: 155 m (509 ft)
- Lowest elevation: 87 m (285 ft)
- Population (2023): 82
  - Density: 11/km^{2} (30/sq mi)
- Time zone: UTC+01:00 (CET)
  - Summer (DST): UTC+02:00 (CEST)
- INSEE/Postal code: 32188 /32500
- ^{1} French Land Register data, which excludes lakes, ponds, glaciers > 1 km^{2} (0.386 sq mi or 247 acres) and river estuaries.

Lamothe-Goas is a commune in the Gers department in southwestern France.

== Geography ==
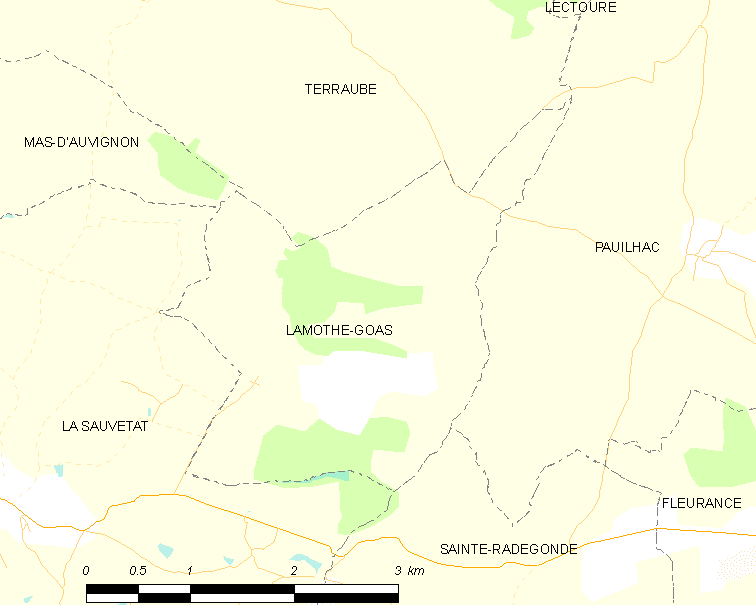
Lamothe-Goas and its surrounding communes

== Population ==
Historical population
Year	Pop.	±% p.a.
1968	73	—
1975	75	+0.39%
1982	70	−0.98%
1990	73	+0.53%
1999	64	−1.45%
2007	62	−0.40%
2012	69	+2.16%
2017	78	+2.48%
2023	82	+0.84%
Source: INSEE

== See also ==
- Communes of the Gers department
