= Préchac, Gers =

Préchac
- Commune
- Location of Préchac
- Location within France Location within Occitanie
- Coordinates: 43°47′30″N 0°34′36″E
- Country: France
- Region: Occitania
- Department: Gers
- Arrondissement: Condom
- Canton: Fleurance-Lomagne
- Intercommunality: Lomagne Gersoise

Government
  - Mayor (2020–2026): Pierre Pellefigue
- Area^{1}: 12.79 km^{2} (4.94 sq mi)
- Elevation: 140 m (460 ft)
- Highest elevation: 218 m (715 ft)
- Lowest elevation: 114 m (374 ft)
- Population (2023): 150
  - Density: 12/km^{2} (30/sq mi)
- Time zone: UTC+01:00 (CET)
  - Summer (DST): UTC+02:00 (CEST)
- INSEE/Postal code: 32329 /32390
- ^{1} French Land Register data, which excludes lakes, ponds, glaciers > 1 km^{2} (0.386 sq mi or 247 acres) and river estuaries.

Préchac (French pronunciation: [pʁeʃak]; Occitan: Preishac) is a commune in the Gers department in southwestern France.

== Geography ==
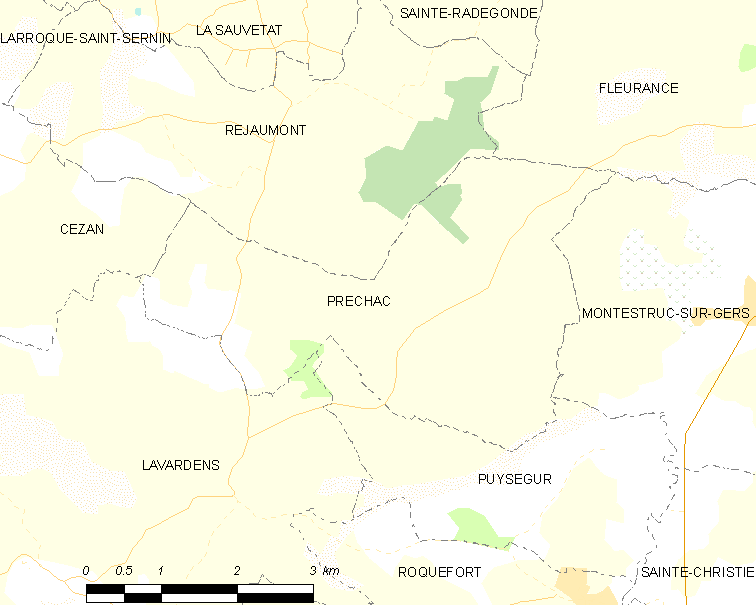
Préchac and its surrounding communes

== Population ==
Historical population
| Year | Pop. | ±% p.a. |
|---|---|---|
| 1968 | 181 | — |
| 1975 | 144 | −3.21% |
| 1982 | 136 | −0.81% |
| 1990 | 133 | −0.28% |
| 1999 | 153 | +1.57% |
| 2007 | 161 | +0.64% |
| 2012 | 177 | +1.91% |
| 2017 | 171 | −0.69% |
| 2023 | 150 | −2.16% |
Source: INSEE

== See also ==
- Communes of the Gers department
