= Fleurance =

- Commune
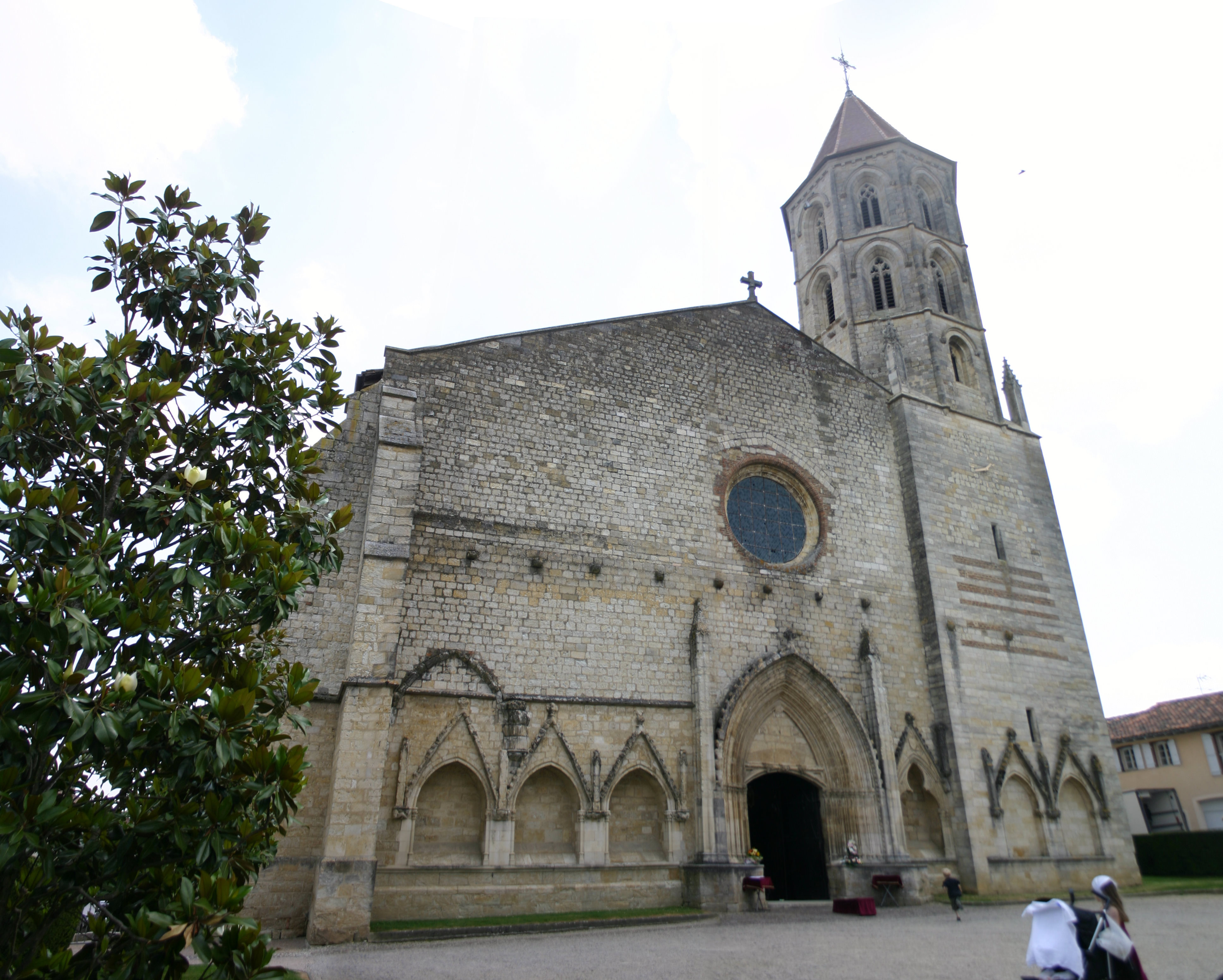
- Saint-Laurent

- Coat of arms
- Location of Fleurance
- Location within France Location within Occitanie
- Coordinates: 43°51′01″N 0°39′52″E
- Country: France
- Region: Occitania
- Department: Gers
- Arrondissement: Condom
- Canton: Fleurance-Lomagne
- Intercommunality: Lomagne Gersoise

Government
  - Mayor (2020–2026): Ronny Guardia-Mazzoleni
- Area^{1}: 43.32 km^{2} (16.73 sq mi)
- Elevation: 98 m (322 ft)
- Highest elevation: 181 m (594 ft)
- Lowest elevation: 83 m (272 ft)
- Population (2023): 6,247
  - Density: 144.2/km^{2} (373.5/sq mi)
- Time zone: UTC+01:00 (CET)
  - Summer (DST): UTC+02:00 (CEST)
- INSEE/Postal code: 32132 /32500
- ^{1} French Land Register data, which excludes lakes, ponds, glaciers > 1 km^{2} (0.386 sq mi or 247 acres) and river estuaries.

Fleurance (French pronunciation: [flœʁɑ̃s]; Occitan: Florença) is a commune in the Gers department in southwestern France.

== Geography ==
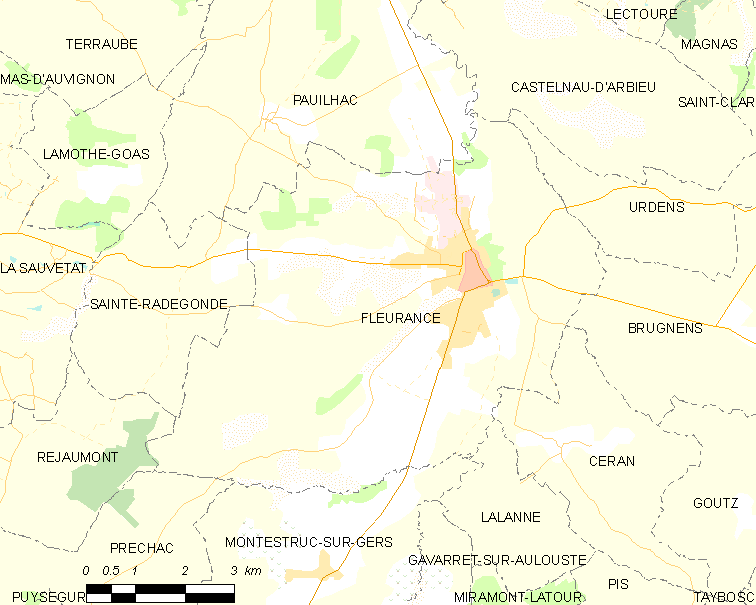
Fleurance and its surrounding communes

== Population ==
Historical population

Year	Pop.	±% p.a.
1793	2,404	—
1800	2,920	+2.82%
1806	2,858	−0.36%
1821	2,847	−0.03%
1831	3,410	+1.82%
1841	3,409	−0.00%
1846	3,898	+2.72%
1851	4,309	+2.03%
1856	4,250	−0.28%
1861	4,275	+0.12%
1866	4,516	+1.10%
1872	4,515	−0.00%
1876	4,550	+0.19%
1881	4,443	−0.47%
1886	4,457	+0.06%
1891	4,282	−0.80%
1896	4,237	−0.21%
1901	4,102	−0.65%

Year	Pop.	±% p.a.
1906	4,085	−0.08%
1911	4,050	−0.17%
1921	3,470	−1.53%
1926	3,583	+0.64%
1931	3,467	−0.66%
1936	3,491	+0.14%
1946	3,744	+0.70%
1954	3,816	+0.24%
1962	4,279	+1.44%
1968	5,154	+3.15%
1975	5,816	+1.74%
1982	6,088	+0.66%
1990	6,368	+0.56%
1999	6,273	−0.17%
2007	6,255	−0.04%
2012	6,245	−0.03%
2017	6,021	−0.73%
2023	6,247	+0.62%

Source: EHESS and INSEE (1968-2023)

== See also ==
- Communes of the Gers department
