= Avezan =

- Commune
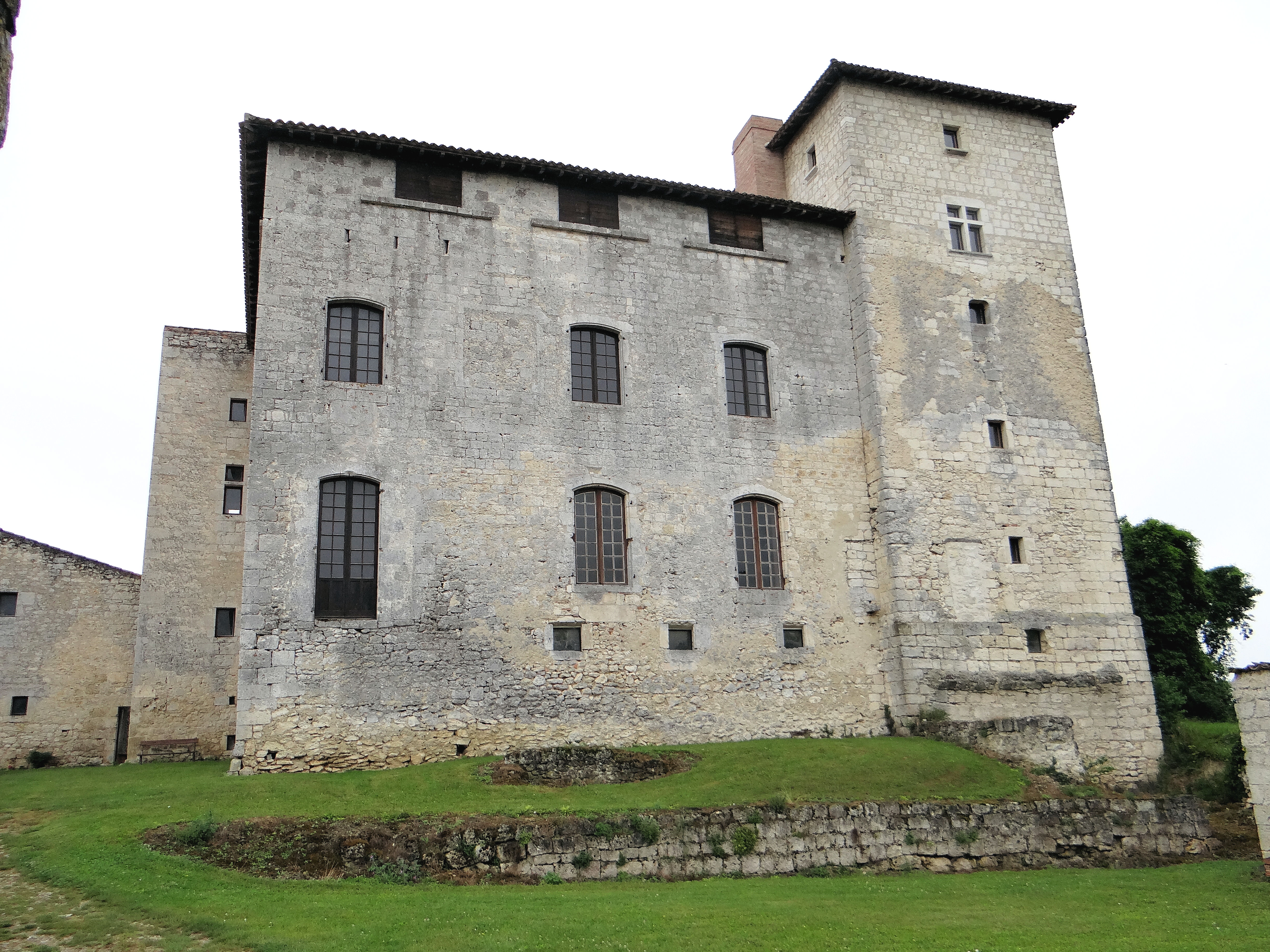
- The castle in Avezan
- Location of Avezan
- Location within France Location within Occitanie
- Coordinates: 43°52′37″N 0°47′48″E
- Country: France
- Region: Occitania
- Department: Gers
- Arrondissement: Condom
- Canton: Fleurance-Lomagne
- Intercommunality: CC Bastides Lomagne

Government
  - Mayor (2020–2026): Joël Durrey
- Area^{1}: 5.66 km^{2} (2.19 sq mi)
- Elevation: 170 m (560 ft)
- Highest elevation: 200 m (660 ft)
- Lowest elevation: 96 m (315 ft)
- Population (2023): 86
  - Density: 15/km^{2} (39/sq mi)
- Time zone: UTC+01:00 (CET)
  - Summer (DST): UTC+02:00 (CEST)
- INSEE/Postal code: 32023 /32380
- ^{1} French Land Register data, which excludes lakes, ponds, glaciers > 1 km^{2} (0.386 sq mi or 247 acres) and river estuaries.

Avezan (French pronunciation: [av(ə)zɑ̃]; Occitan: Avesan) is a commune in the Gers department in southwestern France.

== Geography ==
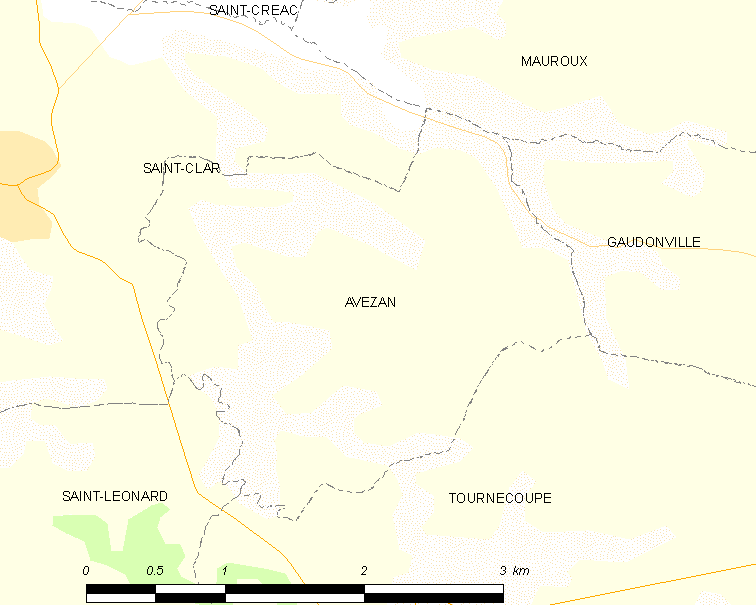
Avezan and its surrounding communes

== Population ==
Historical population
Year	Pop.	±% p.a.
1968	99	—
1975	84	−2.32%
1982	77	−1.24%
1990	83	+0.94%
1999	84	+0.13%
2007	73	−1.74%
2012	73	+0.00%
2017	107	+7.95%
2023	86	−3.58%
Source: INSEE

== See also ==
- Communes of the Gers department
