= Gavarret-sur-Aulouste =

- Commune
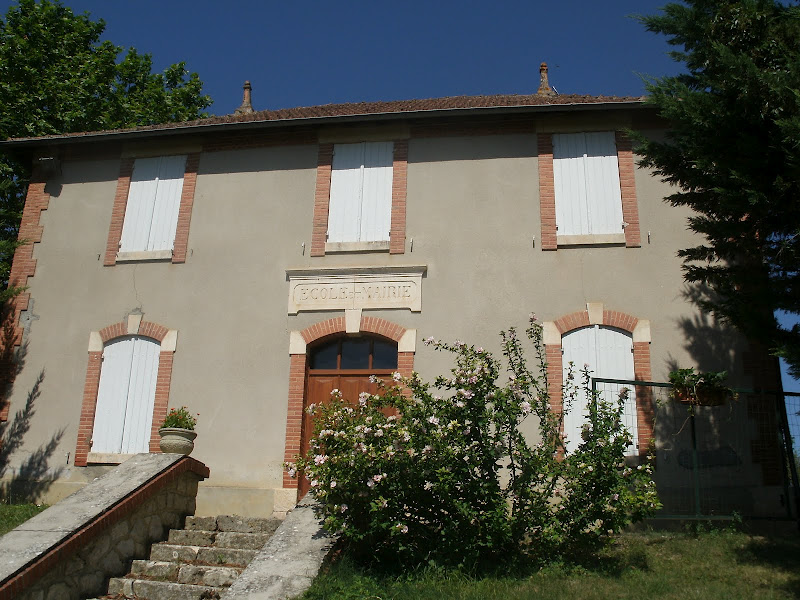
- The town hall and school in Gavarret-sur-Aulouste
- Location of Gavarret-sur-Aulouste
- Location within France Location within Occitanie
- Coordinates: 43°46′21″N 0°39′11″E
- Country: France
- Region: Occitania
- Department: Gers
- Arrondissement: Condom
- Canton: Fleurance-Lomagne
- Intercommunality: Lomagne Gersoise

Government
  - Mayor (2020–2026): Éric Biz
- Area^{1}: 8.38 km^{2} (3.24 sq mi)
- Elevation: 199 m (653 ft)
- Highest elevation: 201 m (659 ft)
- Lowest elevation: 94 m (308 ft)
- Population (2023): 136
  - Density: 16.2/km^{2} (42.0/sq mi)
- Time zone: UTC+01:00 (CET)
  - Summer (DST): UTC+02:00 (CEST)
- INSEE/Postal code: 32142 /32390
- ^{1} French Land Register data, which excludes lakes, ponds, glaciers > 1 km^{2} (0.386 sq mi or 247 acres) and river estuaries.

Gavarret-sur-Aulouste (French pronunciation: [ɡavaʁɛ syʁ olust]; Occitan: Gavarret) is a commune in the Gers department in southwestern France.

== Geography ==
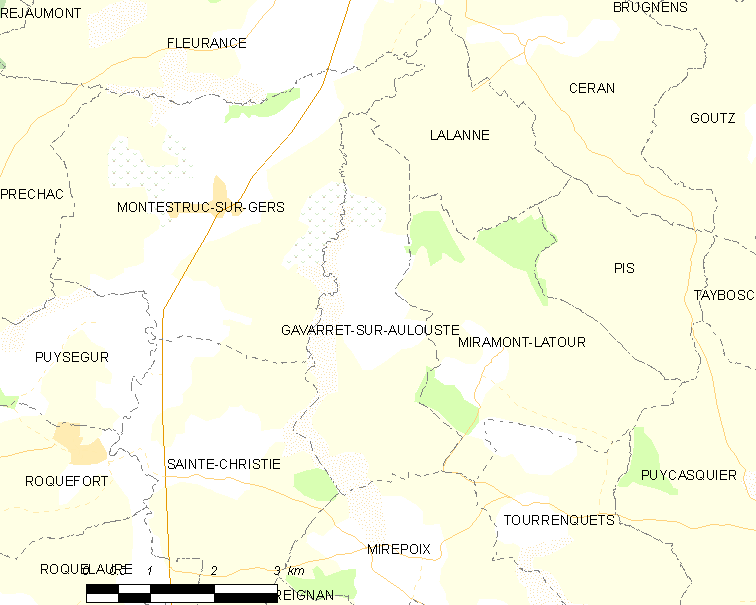
Gavarret-sur-Auguste and its surrounding communes

== Population ==
Historical population
Year	Pop.	±% p.a.
1968	132	—
1975	125	−0.78%
1982	132	+0.78%
1990	121	−1.08%
1999	129	+0.71%
2007	134	+0.48%
2012	135	+0.15%
2017	142	+1.02%
2023	136	−0.72%
Source: INSEE

== See also ==
- Communes of the Gers department
