= Pauilhac =

- Commune
- Location of Pauilhac
- Location within France Location within Occitanie
- Coordinates: 43°52′36″N 0°36′48″E
- Country: France
- Region: Occitania
- Department: Gers
- Arrondissement: Condom
- Canton: Fleurance-Lomagne

Government
  - Mayor (2020–2026): Patrice Suarez
- Area^{1}: 25.27 km^{2} (9.76 sq mi)
- Elevation: 95 m (312 ft)
- Highest elevation: 161 m (528 ft)
- Lowest elevation: 79 m (259 ft)
- Population (2023): 596
  - Density: 23.6/km^{2} (61.1/sq mi)
- Time zone: UTC+01:00 (CET)
  - Summer (DST): UTC+02:00 (CEST)
- INSEE/Postal code: 32306 /32500
- ^{1} French Land Register data, which excludes lakes, ponds, glaciers > 1 km^{2} (0.386 sq mi or 247 acres) and river estuaries.

Pauilhac (French pronunciation: [pojak]; Occitan: Paulhac) is a commune in the Gers department in southwestern France.

== Geography ==
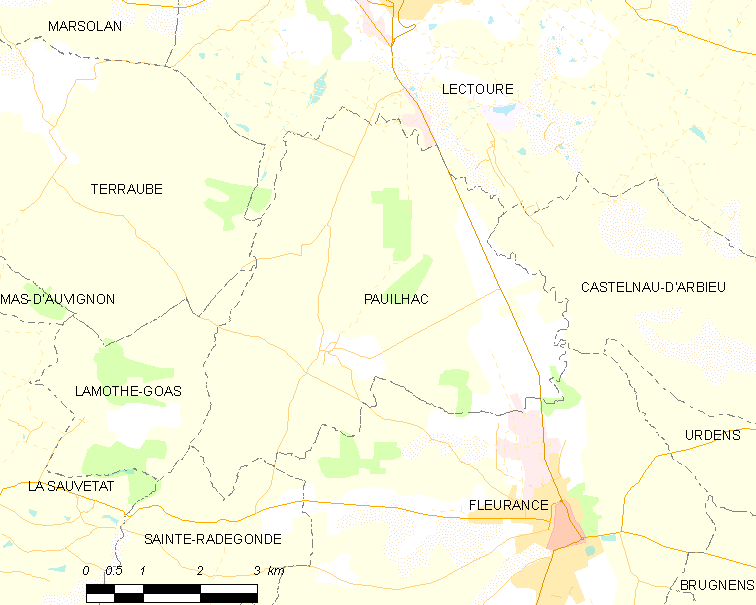
Pauilhac and its surrounding communes

== Population ==
Historical population
Year	Pop.	±% p.a.
1968	377	—
1975	350	−1.06%
1982	375	+0.99%
1990	447	+2.22%
1999	477	+0.72%
2007	553	+1.87%
2012	641	+3.00%
2017	618	−0.73%
2023	596	−0.60%
Source: INSEE

== See also ==
- Communes of the Gers department
