= Castelnau-d'Arbieu =

- Commune
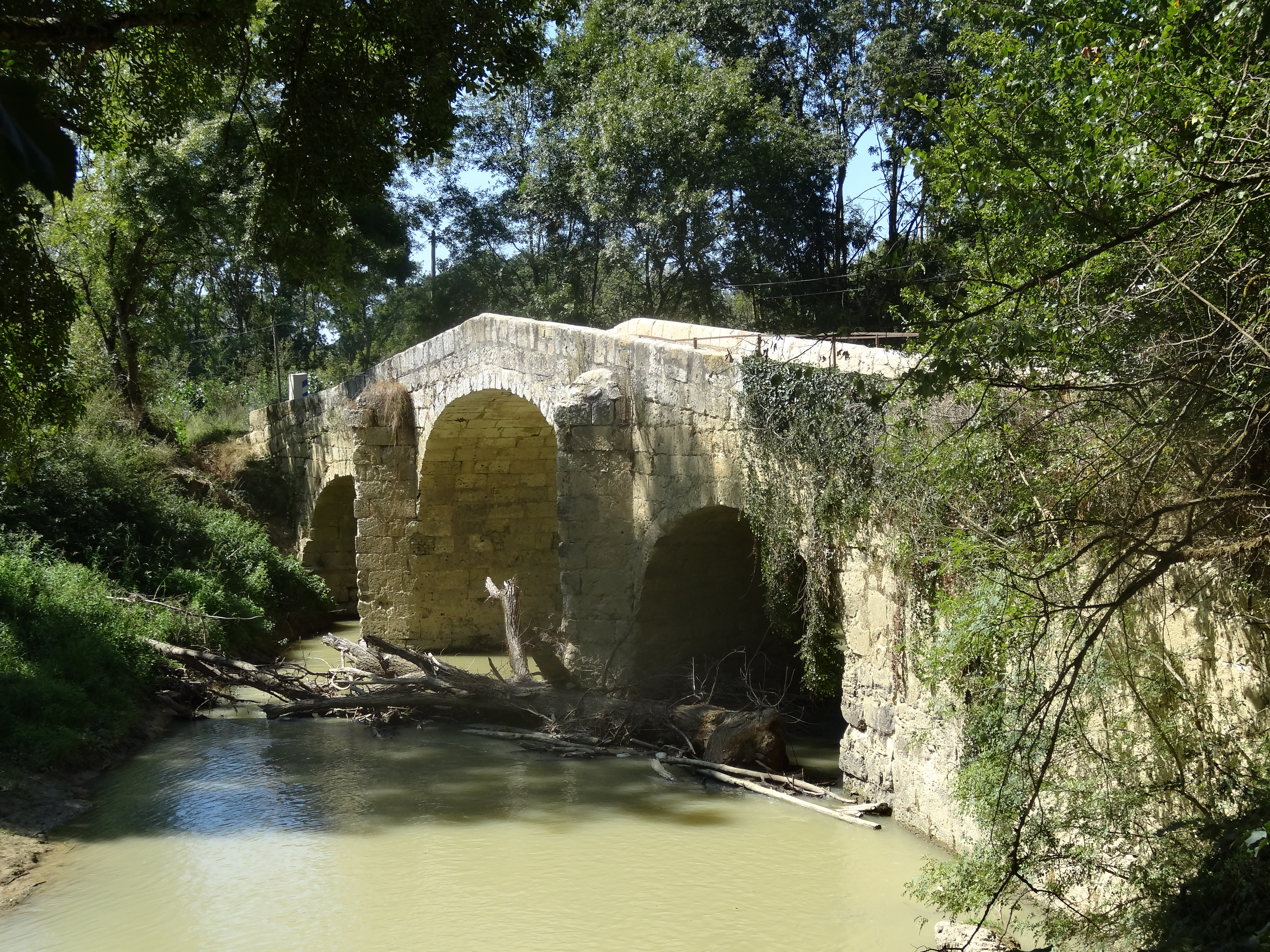
- The old bridge of Aurenque over Gers river

- Coat of arms
- Location of Castelnau-d'Arbieu
- Location within France Location within Occitanie
- Coordinates: 43°53′01″N 0°42′20″E
- Country: France
- Region: Occitania
- Department: Gers
- Arrondissement: Condom
- Canton: Fleurance-Lomagne
- Intercommunality: Lomagne Gersoise

Government
  - Mayor (2020–2026): Olivier Tarbouriech
- Area^{1}: 16.34 km^{2} (6.31 sq mi)
- Elevation: 209 m (686 ft)
- Highest elevation: 231 m (758 ft)
- Lowest elevation: 79 m (259 ft)
- Population (2023): 223
  - Density: 13.6/km^{2} (35.3/sq mi)
- Time zone: UTC+01:00 (CET)
  - Summer (DST): UTC+02:00 (CEST)
- INSEE/Postal code: 32078 /32500
- ^{1} French Land Register data, which excludes lakes, ponds, glaciers > 1 km^{2} (0.386 sq mi or 247 acres) and river estuaries.

Castelnau-d'Arbieu (French pronunciation: [kastɛlno daʁbjø]; Occitan: Castèthnau d'Arbiu) is a commune in the Gers department in southwestern France.

== Geography ==
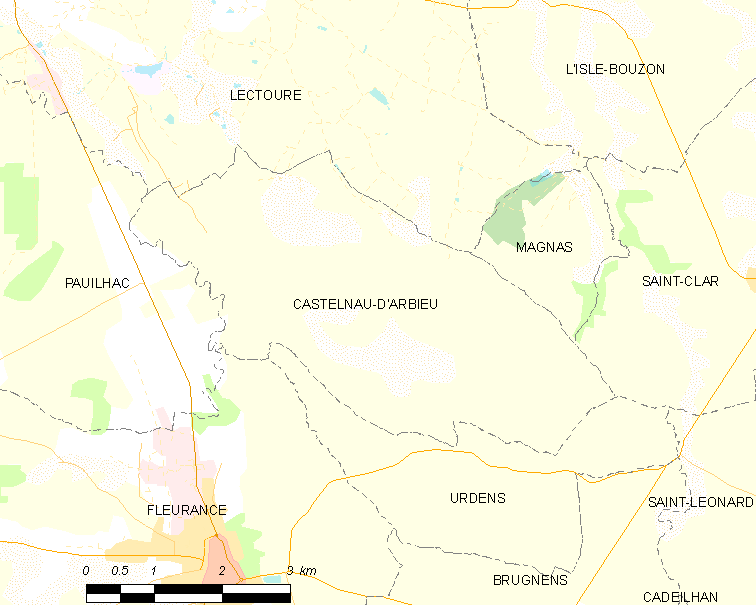
Castelnau-d'Arbieu and its surrounding communes

== Population ==
Historical population
Year	Pop.	±% p.a.
1968	270	—
1975	220	−2.88%
1982	204	−1.07%
1990	188	−1.02%
1999	187	−0.06%
2007	194	+0.46%
2012	216	+2.17%
2017	234	+1.61%
2023	223	−0.80%
Source: INSEE

== See also ==
- Communes of the Gers department
