= Céran =

- Commune
- Coat of arms
- Location of Céran
- Location within France Location within Occitanie
- Coordinates: 43°49′05″N 0°41′18″E
- Country: France
- Region: Occitania
- Department: Gers
- Arrondissement: Condom
- Canton: Fleurance-Lomagne
- Intercommunality: Lomagne Gersoise

Government
  - Mayor (2020–2026): François Bouchard
- Area^{1}: 10.74 km^{2} (4.15 sq mi)
- Elevation: 103 m (338 ft)
- Highest elevation: 181 m (594 ft)
- Lowest elevation: 89 m (292 ft)
- Population (2023): 229
  - Density: 21.3/km^{2} (55.2/sq mi)
- Time zone: UTC+01:00 (CET)
  - Summer (DST): UTC+02:00 (CEST)
- INSEE/Postal code: 32101 /32500
- ^{1} French Land Register data, which excludes lakes, ponds, glaciers > 1 km^{2} (0.386 sq mi or 247 acres) and river estuaries.

Céran (French pronunciation: [seʁɑ̃]; Occitan: Ceran) is a commune in the Gers department in southwestern France.

== Geography ==
The river Auroue forms part of the commune's eastern border.

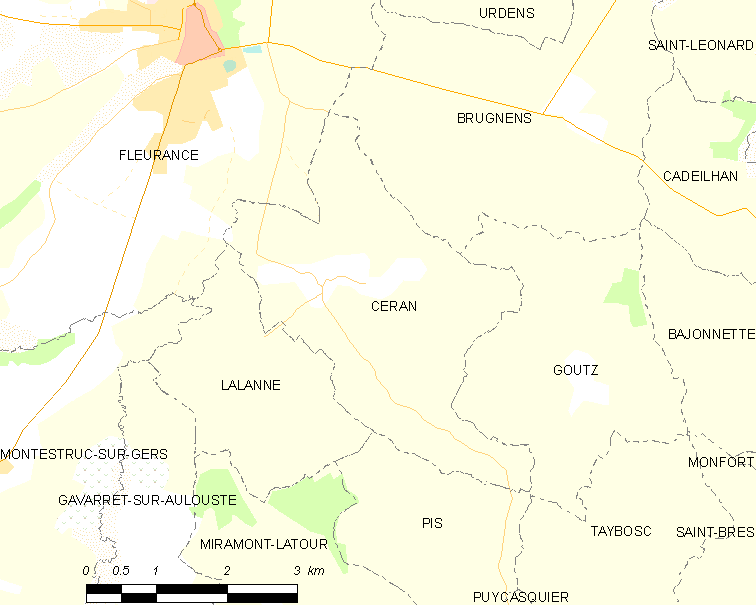
Céran and its surrounding communes

== Population ==
Historical population
Year	Pop.	±% p.a.
1968	166	—
1975	175	+0.76%
1982	151	−2.09%
1990	152	+0.08%
1999	149	−0.22%
2007	169	+1.59%
2012	194	+2.80%
2017	222	+2.73%
2023	229	+0.52%
Source: INSEE

== See also ==
- Communes of the Gers department
