= Mauroux, Gers =

Mauroux
- Commune
- Coat of arms
- Location of Mauroux
- Location within France Location within Occitanie
- Coordinates: 43°54′46″N 0°48′39″E
- Country: France
- Region: Occitania
- Department: Gers
- Arrondissement: Condom
- Canton: Fleurance-Lomagne

Government
  - Mayor (2020–2026): Christian Cardona
- Area^{1}: 9.96 km^{2} (3.85 sq mi)
- Elevation: 130 m (430 ft)
- Highest elevation: 256 m (840 ft)
- Lowest elevation: 105 m (344 ft)
- Population (2023): 143
  - Density: 14.4/km^{2} (37.2/sq mi)
- Time zone: UTC+01:00 (CET)
  - Summer (DST): UTC+02:00 (CEST)
- INSEE/Postal code: 32248 /32380
- ^{1} French Land Register data, which excludes lakes, ponds, glaciers > 1 km^{2} (0.386 sq mi or 247 acres) and river estuaries.

Mauroux (French pronunciation: [moʁu]; Occitan: Maurós) is a commune in the Gers department in southwestern France.

== Geography ==
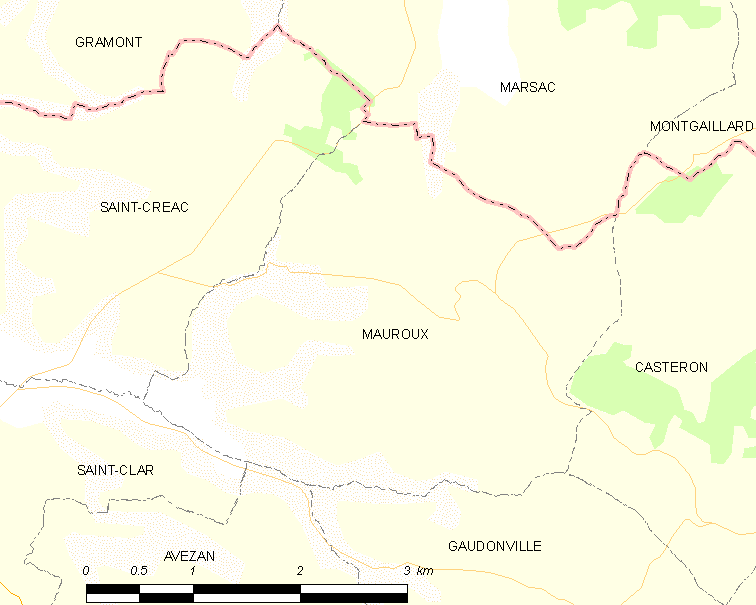
Mauroux and its surrounding communes

== Population ==
Historical population
| Year | Pop. | ±% p.a. |
|---|---|---|
| 1968 | 151 | — |
| 1975 | 133 | −1.80% |
| 1982 | 103 | −3.59% |
| 1990 | 104 | +0.12% |
| 1999 | 113 | +0.93% |
| 2007 | 141 | +2.81% |
| 2012 | 142 | +0.14% |
| 2017 | 135 | −1.01% |
| 2023 | 143 | +0.96% |
Source: INSEE

== See also ==
- Communes of the Gers department
