= Montestruc-sur-Gers =

- Commune
- Coat of arms
- Location of Montestruc-sur-Gers
- Location within France Location within Occitanie
- Coordinates: 43°47′37″N 0°37′47″E
- Country: France
- Region: Occitania
- Department: Gers
- Arrondissement: Condom
- Canton: Fleurance-Lomagne
- Intercommunality: Lomagne Gersoise

Government
  - Mayor (2022–2026): Gisèle Gimat
- Area^{1}: 16.31 km^{2} (6.30 sq mi)
- Elevation: 102 m (335 ft)
- Highest elevation: 180 m (590 ft)
- Lowest elevation: 91 m (299 ft)
- Population (2023): 695
  - Density: 42.6/km^{2} (110/sq mi)
- Time zone: UTC+01:00 (CET)
  - Summer (DST): UTC+02:00 (CEST)
- INSEE/Postal code: 32286 /32390
- ^{1} French Land Register data, which excludes lakes, ponds, glaciers > 1 km^{2} (0.386 sq mi or 247 acres) and river estuaries.

Montestruc-sur-Gers (French pronunciation: [mɔ̃tɛstʁyk syʁ ʒɛʁ(s)], literally Montestruc on Gers; Occitan: Montastruc) is a commune in the Gers department in southwestern France.

== Geography ==
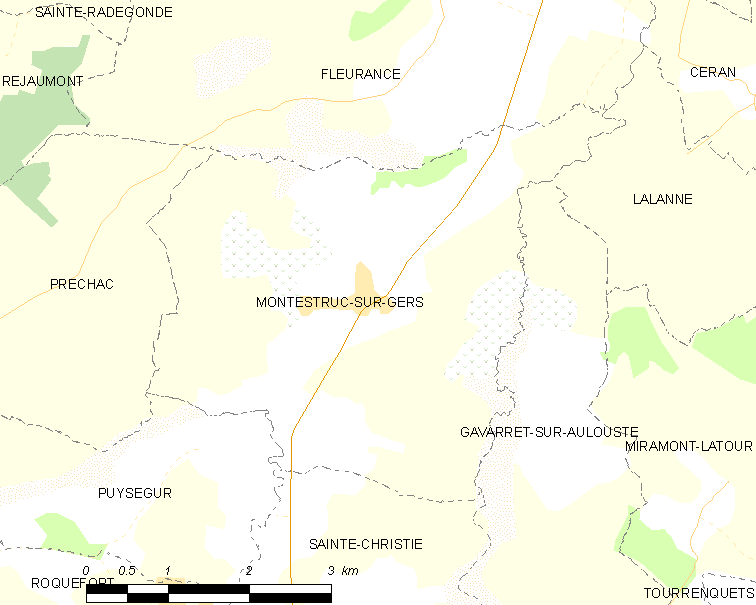
Montestruc-sur-Gers and its surrounding communes

== Population ==
Historical population
| Year | Pop. | ±% p.a. |
|---|---|---|
| 1968 | 563 | — |
| 1975 | 568 | +0.13% |
| 1982 | 541 | −0.69% |
| 1990 | 608 | +1.47% |
| 1999 | 597 | −0.20% |
| 2007 | 694 | +1.90% |
| 2012 | 716 | +0.63% |
| 2017 | 705 | −0.31% |
| 2023 | 695 | −0.24% |
Source: INSEE

== See also ==
- Communes of the Gers department
