= Brugnens =

- Commune
- Location of Brugnens
- Location within France Location within Occitanie
- Coordinates: 43°50′28″N 0°43′48″E
- Country: France
- Region: Occitania
- Department: Gers
- Arrondissement: Condom
- Canton: Fleurance-Lomagne
- Intercommunality: Lomagne Gersoise

Government
  - Mayor (2020–2026): Jean-Jacques Sangalli
- Area^{1}: 13.45 km^{2} (5.19 sq mi)
- Elevation: 192 m (630 ft)
- Highest elevation: 200 m (660 ft)
- Lowest elevation: 97 m (318 ft)
- Population (2023): 254
  - Density: 18.9/km^{2} (48.9/sq mi)
- Time zone: UTC+01:00 (CET)
  - Summer (DST): UTC+02:00 (CEST)
- INSEE/Postal code: 32066 /32500
- ^{1} French Land Register data, which excludes lakes, ponds, glaciers > 1 km^{2} (0.386 sq mi or 247 acres) and river estuaries.

Brugnens is a commune in the Gers department in southwestern France.

== Geography ==
The river Auroue forms all of the commune's eastern border.

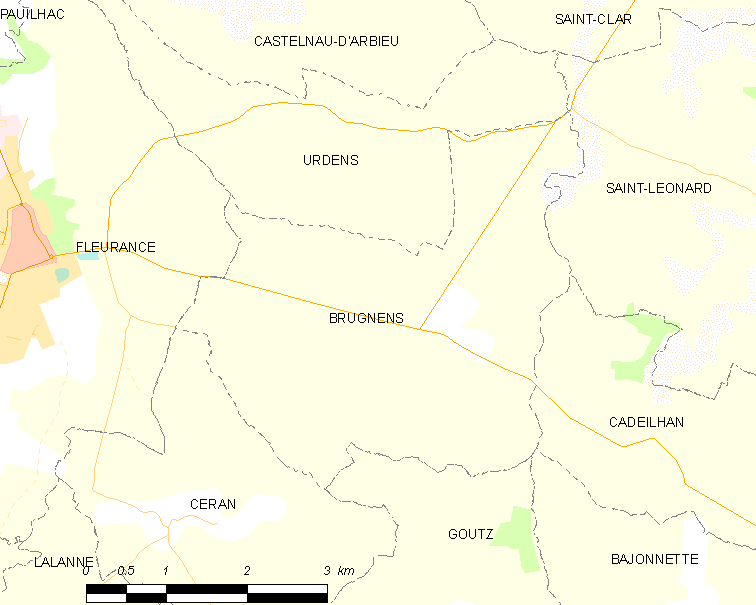
Brugnens and its surrounding communes

== Population ==
Historical population
Year	Pop.	±% p.a.
1968	251	—
1975	221	−1.80%
1982	231	+0.63%
1990	244	+0.69%
1999	250	+0.27%
2007	255	+0.25%
2012	253	−0.16%
2017	256	+0.24%
2023	254	−0.13%
Source: INSEE

== See also ==
- Communes of the Gers department
