= Cadeilhan =

- Commune
- Location of Cadeilhan
- Location within France Location within Occitanie
- Coordinates: 43°49′47″N 0°46′20″E
- Country: France
- Region: Occitania
- Department: Gers
- Arrondissement: Condom
- Canton: Fleurance-Lomagne
- Intercommunality: Lomagne Gersoise

Government
  - Mayor (2020–2026): Édouard Schmidt
- Area^{1}: 8.43 km^{2} (3.25 sq mi)
- Elevation: 180 m (590 ft)
- Highest elevation: 194 m (636 ft)
- Lowest elevation: 122 m (400 ft)
- Population (2023): 150
  - Density: 18/km^{2} (46/sq mi)
- Time zone: UTC+01:00 (CET)
  - Summer (DST): UTC+02:00 (CEST)
- INSEE/Postal code: 32068 /32380
- ^{1} French Land Register data, which excludes lakes, ponds, glaciers > 1 km^{2} (0.386 sq mi or 247 acres) and river estuaries.

Cadeilhan (French pronunciation: [kadɛjɑ̃]; Occitan: Cadelhan) is a commune in the Gers department in southwestern France.

== Geography ==
The river Auroue forms most of the commune's western border.

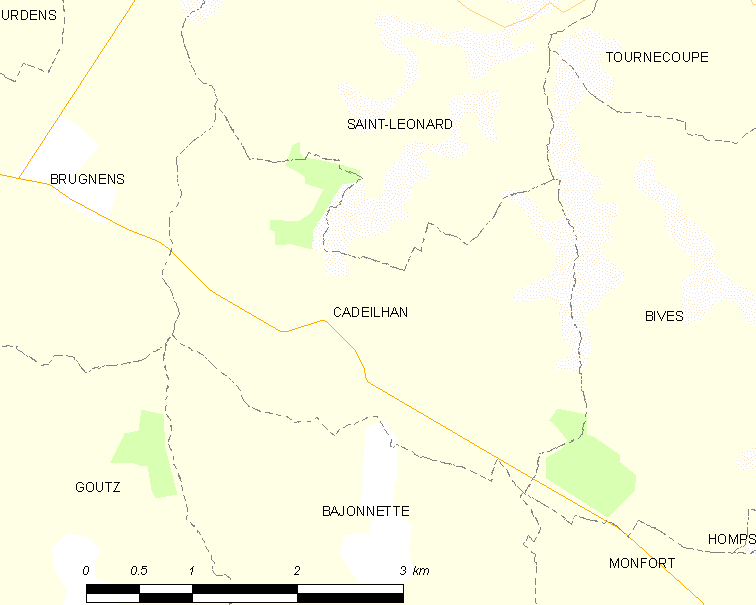
Cadeilhan and its surrounding communes

== Population ==
Historical population
Year	Pop.	±% p.a.
1968	111	—
1975	121	+1.24%
1982	117	−0.48%
1990	100	−1.94%
1999	100	+0.00%
2007	133	+3.63%
2012	124	−1.39%
2017	139	+2.31%
2023	150	+1.28%
Source: INSEE

== See also ==
- Communes of the Gers department
