= Lalanne, Gers =

Lalanne
- Commune
- Location of Lalanne
- Location within France Location within Occitanie
- Coordinates: 43°47′53″N 0°41′06″E
- Country: France
- Region: Occitania
- Department: Gers
- Arrondissement: Condom
- Canton: Fleurance-Lomagne
- Intercommunality: Lomagne Gersoise

Government
  - Mayor (2020–2026): Pierre Caubet
- Area^{1}: 5.55 km^{2} (2.14 sq mi)
- Elevation: 125 m (410 ft)
- Highest elevation: 144 m (472 ft)
- Lowest elevation: 90 m (300 ft)
- Population (2023): 134
  - Density: 24.1/km^{2} (62.5/sq mi)
- Time zone: UTC+01:00 (CET)
  - Summer (DST): UTC+02:00 (CEST)
- INSEE/Postal code: 32184 /32500
- ^{1} French Land Register data, which excludes lakes, ponds, glaciers > 1 km^{2} (0.386 sq mi or 247 acres) and river estuaries.

Lalanne (French pronunciation: [lalan]; Occitan: La Lana) is a commune in the Gers department in southwestern France.

== Geography ==
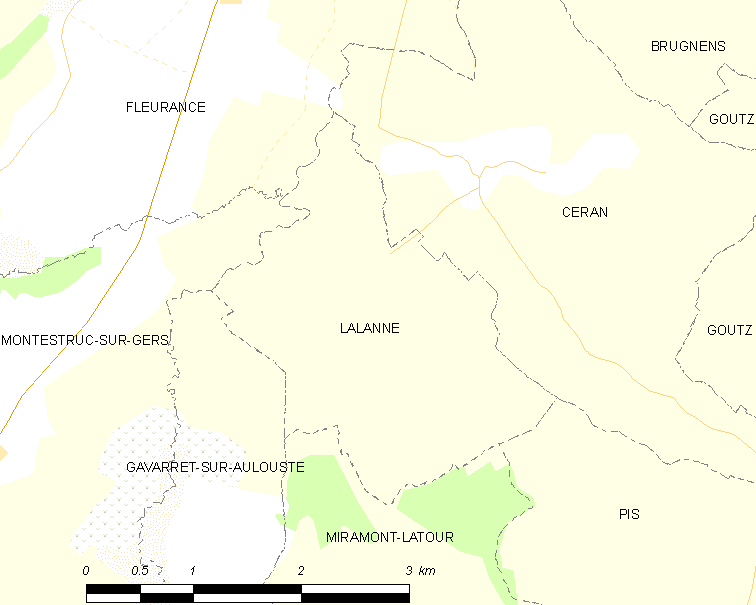
Lalanne and its surrounding communes

== Population ==
Historical population
Year	Pop.	±% p.a.
1968	85	—
1975	86	+0.17%
1982	65	−3.92%
1990	62	−0.59%
1999	91	+4.36%
2007	111	+2.51%
2012	127	+2.73%
2017	137	+1.53%
2023	134	−0.37%
Source: INSEE

== See also ==
- Communes of the Gers department
