= Tournecoupe =

- Commune
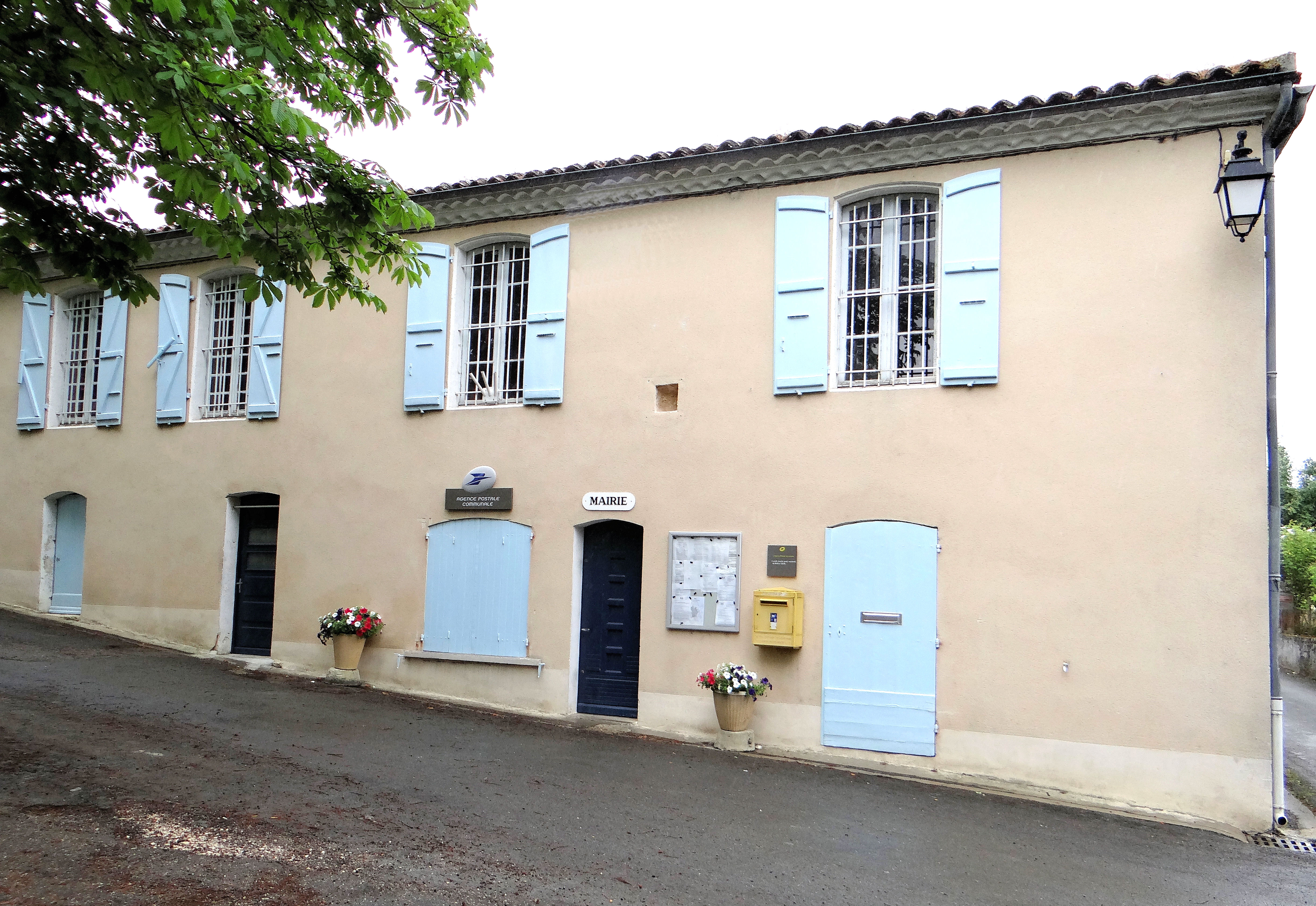
- Town hall

- Coat of arms
- Location of Tournecoupe
- Location within France Location within Occitanie
- Coordinates: 43°51′50″N 0°48′42″E
- Country: France
- Region: Occitania
- Department: Gers
- Arrondissement: Condom
- Canton: Fleurance-Lomagne

Government
  - Mayor (2020–2026): Patrick Bet
- Area^{1}: 18.95 km^{2} (7.32 sq mi)
- Elevation: 164 m (538 ft)
- Highest elevation: 221 m (725 ft)
- Lowest elevation: 97 m (318 ft)
- Population (2023): 262
  - Density: 13.8/km^{2} (35.8/sq mi)
- Time zone: UTC+01:00 (CET)
  - Summer (DST): UTC+02:00 (CEST)
- INSEE/Postal code: 32452 /32380
- ^{1} French Land Register data, which excludes lakes, ponds, glaciers > 1 km^{2} (0.386 sq mi or 247 acres) and river estuaries.

Tournecoupe (French pronunciation: [tuʁnəkup]；Occitan: Tornacopa) is a commune in the Gers department in southwestern France.

== Geography ==
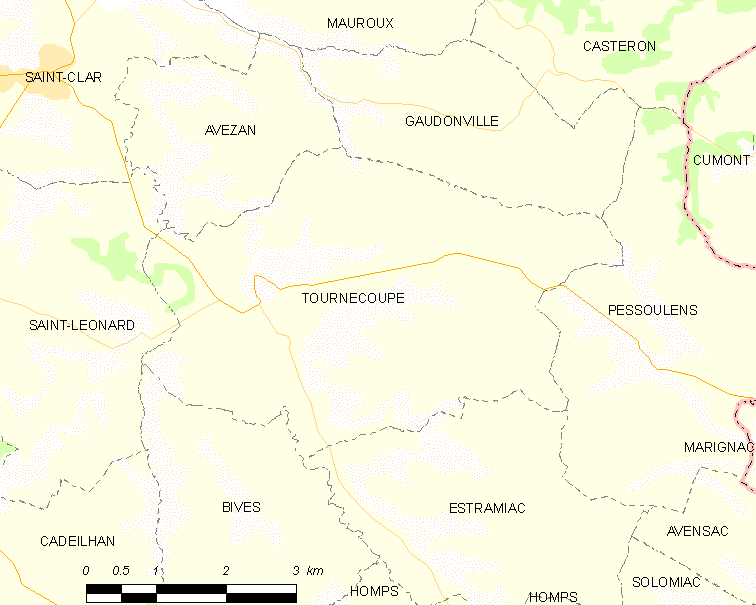
Tournecoupe and its surrounding communes

== Population ==
Historical population
Year	Pop.	±% p.a.
1968	439	—
1975	416	−0.77%
1982	349	−2.48%
1990	276	−2.89%
1999	267	−0.37%
2007	281	+0.64%
2012	279	−0.14%
2017	263	−1.17%
2023	262	−0.06%
Source: INSEE

== See also ==
- Communes of the Gers department
