= Bivès =

- Commune
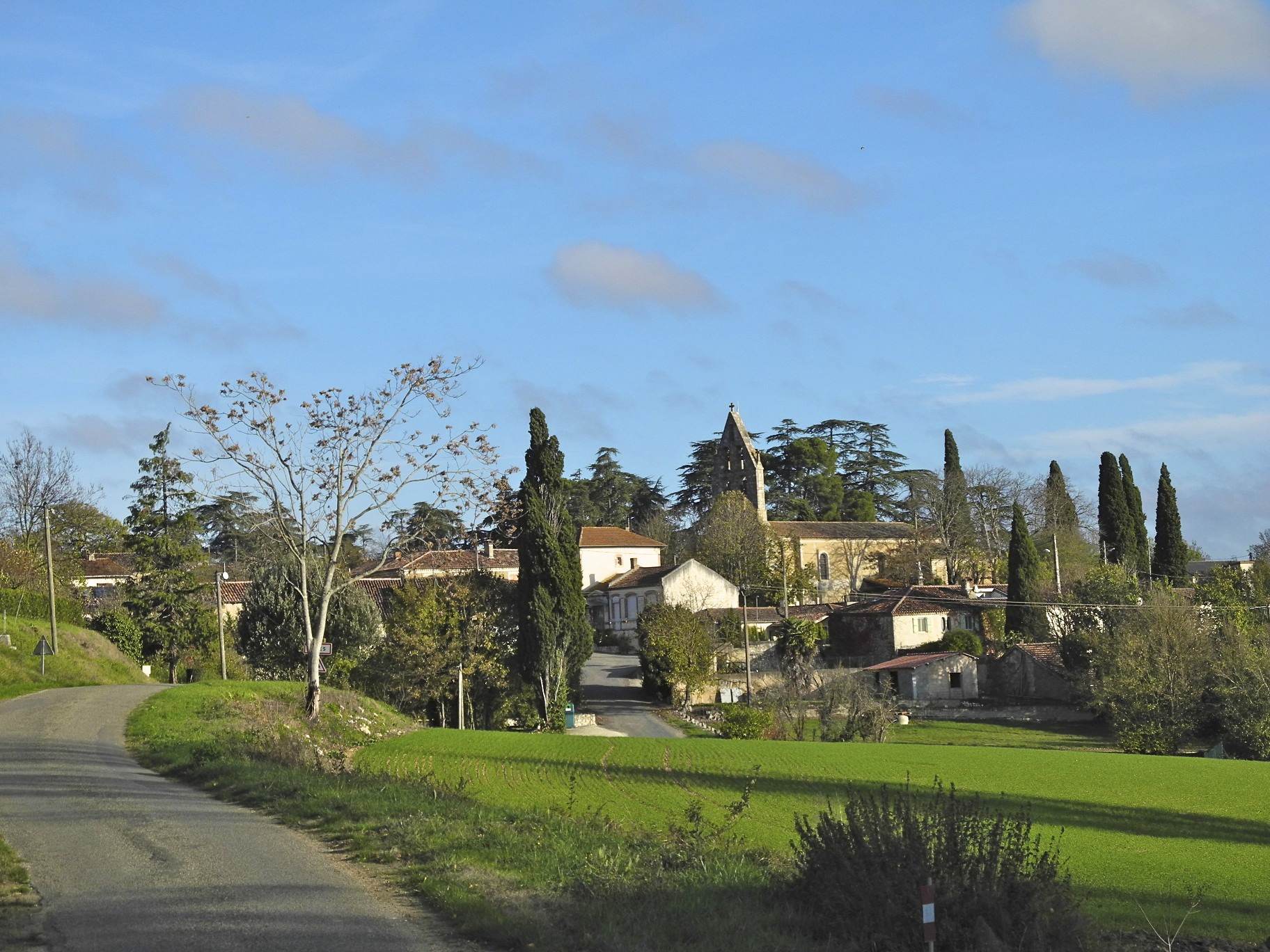
- A general view of Bivès
- Location of Bivès
- Location within France Location within Occitanie
- Coordinates: 43°50′03″N 0°48′20″E
- Country: France
- Region: Occitania
- Department: Gers
- Arrondissement: Condom
- Canton: Fleurance-Lomagne

Government
  - Mayor (2020–2026): Chantal Calac
- Area^{1}: 9.93 km^{2} (3.83 sq mi)
- Elevation: 182 m (597 ft)
- Highest elevation: 192 m (630 ft)
- Lowest elevation: 107 m (351 ft)
- Population (2023): 111
  - Density: 11.2/km^{2} (29.0/sq mi)
- Time zone: UTC+01:00 (CET)
  - Summer (DST): UTC+02:00 (CEST)
- INSEE/Postal code: 32055 /32380
- ^{1} French Land Register data, which excludes lakes, ponds, glaciers > 1 km^{2} (0.386 sq mi or 247 acres) and river estuaries.

Bivès (French pronunciation: [bivɛs]; Occitan: Vivèrs) is a commune in the Gers department in southwestern France.

== Geography ==
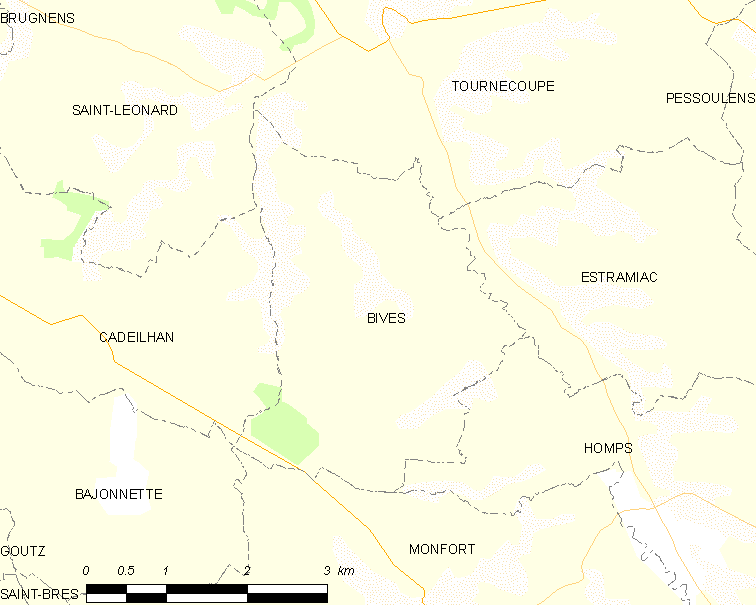
Bivès and its surrounding communes

== Population ==
Historical population
Year	Pop.	±% p.a.
1968	170	—
1975	147	−2.06%
1982	133	−1.42%
1990	125	−0.77%
1999	130	+0.44%
2007	131	+0.10%
2012	124	−1.09%
2017	133	+1.41%
2023	111	−2.97%
Source: INSEE

== See also ==
- Communes of the Gers department
