= Monguilhem =

- Commune
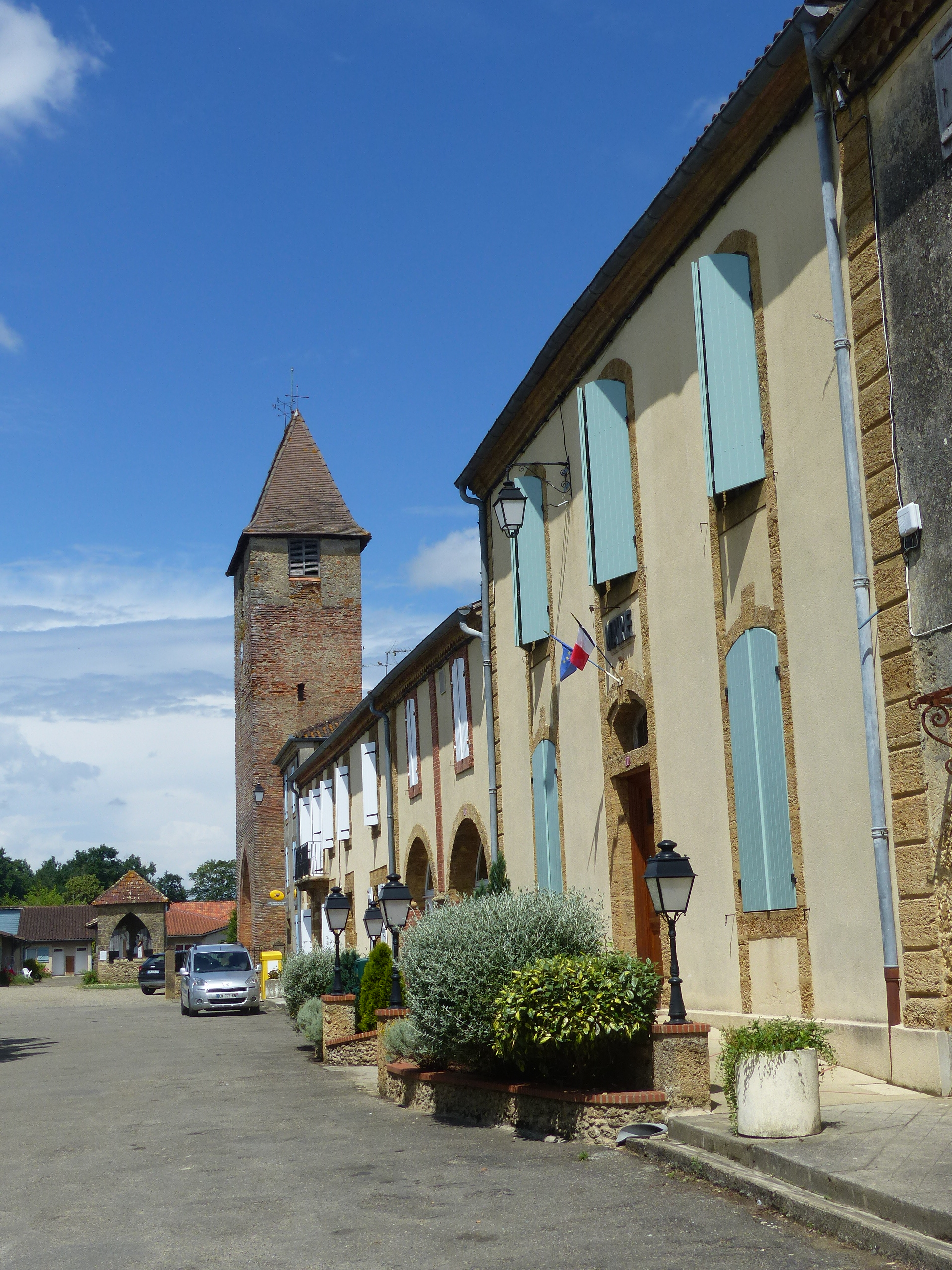
- The town hall and bell tower in Monguilhem
- Location of Monguilhem
- Location within France Location within Occitanie
- Coordinates: 43°51′22″N 0°10′49″W
- Country: France
- Region: Occitania
- Department: Gers
- Arrondissement: Condom
- Canton: Grand-Bas-Armagnac
- Intercommunality: Bas-Armagnac

Government
  - Mayor (2020–2026): Jean Ducéré
- Area^{1}: 5.71 km^{2} (2.20 sq mi)
- Elevation: 88 m (289 ft)
- Highest elevation: 107 m (351 ft)
- Lowest elevation: 67 m (220 ft)
- Population (2023): 282
  - Density: 49.4/km^{2} (128/sq mi)
- Time zone: UTC+01:00 (CET)
  - Summer (DST): UTC+02:00 (CEST)
- INSEE/Postal code: 32271 /32240
- ^{1} French Land Register data, which excludes lakes, ponds, glaciers > 1 km^{2} (0.386 sq mi or 247 acres) and river estuaries.

Monguilhem (French pronunciation: [mɔ̃ɡijɛm]; Occitan: Montguilhèm) is a commune in the Gers department in southwestern France.

== Geography ==
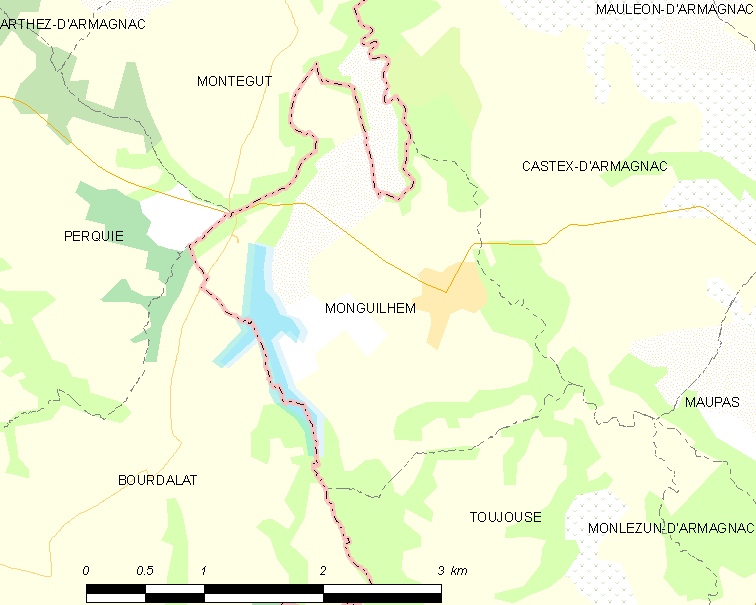
Monguilhem and its surrounding communes

== Population ==
Historical population
Year	Pop.	±% p.a.
1968	298	—
1975	329	+1.42%
1982	266	−2.99%
1990	256	−0.48%
1999	302	+1.85%
2007	299	−0.12%
2012	297	−0.13%
2017	309	+0.80%
2023	282	−1.51%
Source: INSEE

== See also ==
- Communes of the Gers department
