= Pis, Gers =

Pis
- Commune
- Location of Pis
- Location within France Location within Occitanie
- Coordinates: 43°47′07″N 0°42′43″E
- Country: France
- Region: Occitania
- Department: Gers
- Arrondissement: Condom
- Canton: Fleurance-Lomagne
- Intercommunality: Lomagne Gersoise

Government
  - Mayor (2020–2026): Alain Mares
- Area^{1}: 5.36 km^{2} (2.07 sq mi)
- Elevation: 167 m (548 ft)
- Highest elevation: 194 m (636 ft)
- Lowest elevation: 117 m (384 ft)
- Population (2023): 93
  - Density: 17/km^{2} (45/sq mi)
- Time zone: UTC+01:00 (CET)
  - Summer (DST): UTC+02:00 (CEST)
- INSEE/Postal code: 32318 /32500
- ^{1} French Land Register data, which excludes lakes, ponds, glaciers > 1 km^{2} (0.386 sq mi or 247 acres) and river estuaries.

Pis (Occitan: Pis) is a commune in the Gers department in southwestern France.

== Geography ==
=== Localisation ===
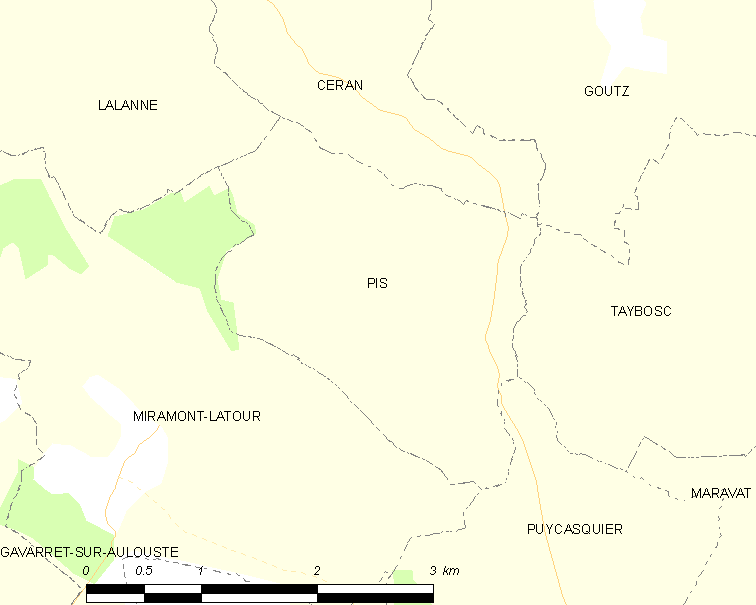
Pis and its surrounding communes

=== Hydrography ===
The river Auroue forms most of the commune's eastern border.

== Population ==
Historical population
| Year | Pop. | ±% p.a. |
|---|---|---|
| 1968 | 92 | — |
| 1975 | 78 | −2.33% |
| 1982 | 77 | −0.18% |
| 1990 | 74 | −0.50% |
| 1999 | 80 | +0.87% |
| 2007 | 93 | +1.90% |
| 2012 | 95 | +0.43% |
| 2017 | 113 | +3.53% |
| 2023 | 93 | −3.19% |
Source: INSEE

== See also ==
- Communes of the Gers department
