= Pessoulens =

- Commune
- Location of Pessoulens
- Location within France Location within Occitanie
- Coordinates: 43°51′12″N 0°52′38″E
- Country: France
- Region: Occitania
- Department: Gers
- Arrondissement: Condom
- Canton: Fleurance-Lomagne

Government
  - Mayor (2020–2026): Pascal Gouget
- Area^{1}: 12.63 km^{2} (4.88 sq mi)
- Elevation: 160 m (520 ft)
- Highest elevation: 262 m (860 ft)
- Lowest elevation: 115 m (377 ft)
- Population (2023): 137
  - Density: 10.8/km^{2} (28.1/sq mi)
- Time zone: UTC+01:00 (CET)
  - Summer (DST): UTC+02:00 (CEST)
- INSEE/Postal code: 32313 /32380
- ^{1} French Land Register data, which excludes lakes, ponds, glaciers > 1 km^{2} (0.386 sq mi or 247 acres) and river estuaries.

Pessoulens is a commune in the Gers department in southwestern France.

== Geography ==
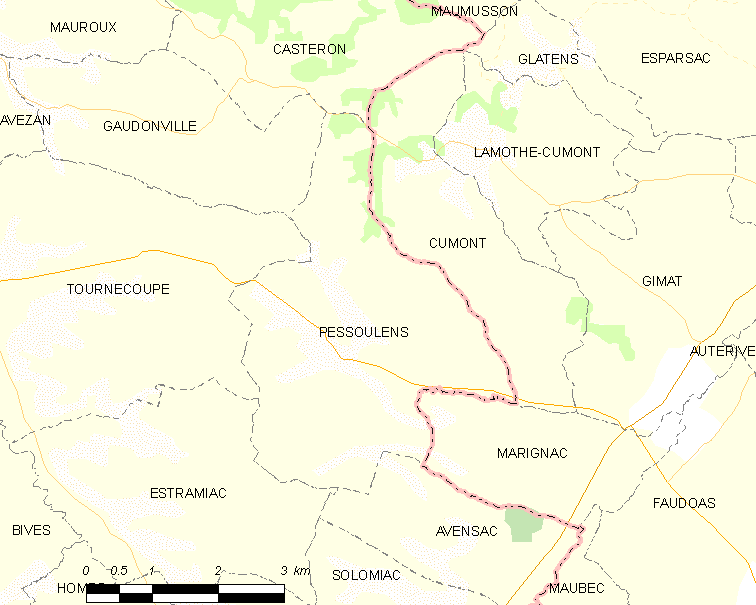
Pessoulens and its surrounding communes

== Population ==
Historical population
Year	Pop.	±% p.a.
1968	205	—
1975	186	−1.38%
1982	176	−0.79%
1990	166	−0.73%
1999	159	−0.48%
2007	147	−0.98%
2012	165	+2.34%
2017	142	−2.96%
2023	137	−0.60%
Source: INSEE

== See also ==
- Communes of the Gers department
