= Arrondissement of Condom =

Coordinates: 43°57′N 0°22′E

Condom
- Arrondissement
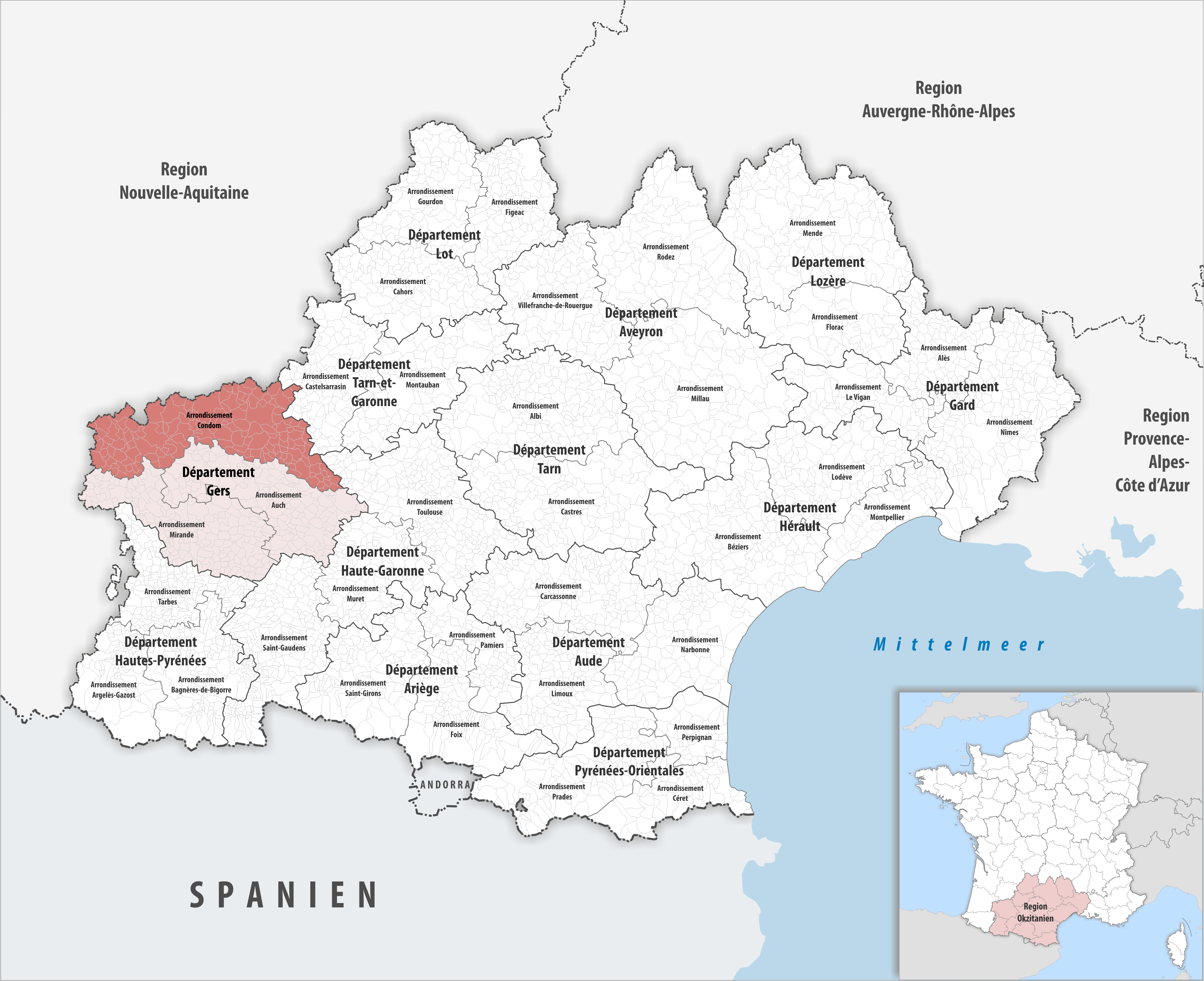
- Location within the region Occitanie
- Country: France
- Region: Occitania
- Department: Gers
- No. of communes: {{{nbcomm}}}
- Area: 2,462.2 km^{2} (950.7 sq mi)
- Population (2023): 67,424
  - Density: 27.384/km^{2} (70.923/sq mi)
- INSEE code: 322

The arrondissement of Condom is an arrondissement of France in the Gers department in the Occitanie region. It has 162 communes. Its population is 67,094 (2021), and its area is 2,462.2 km^{2} (950.7 sq mi).

== Composition ==
The communes of the arrondissement of Condom, and their INSEE codes, are:

1. Arblade-le-Haut (32005)
2. Ardizas (32007)
3. Avensac (32021)
4. Avezan (32023)
5. Ayzieu (32025)
6. Bajonnette (32026)
7. Bascous (32031)
8. Beaucaire (32035)
9. Beaumont (32037)
10. Béraut (32044)
11. Berrac (32047)
12. Bétous (32049)
13. Bivès (32055)
14. Blaziert (32057)
15. Bourrouillan (32062)
16. Bretagne-d'Armagnac (32064)
17. Brugnens (32066)
18. Cadeilhan (32068)
19. Campagne-d'Armagnac (32073)
20. Cassaigne (32075)
21. Castelnau-d'Arbieu (32078)
22. Castelnau-d'Auzan-Labarrère (32079)
23. Castelnau-sur-l'Auvignon (32080)
24. Castéra-Lectourois (32082)
25. Castéron (32084)
26. Castet-Arrouy (32085)
27. Castex-d'Armagnac (32087)
28. Catonvielle (32092)
29. Caupenne-d'Armagnac (32094)
30. Caussens (32095)
31. Cazaubon (32096)
32. Cazeneuve (32100)
33. Céran (32101)
34. Cézan (32102)
35. Cologne (32106)
36. Condom (32107)
37. Courrensan (32110)
38. Cravencères (32113)
39. Dému (32115)
40. Eauze (32119)
41. Encausse (32120)
42. Espas (32125)
43. Estang (32127)
44. Estramiac (32129)
45. Flamarens (32131)
46. Fleurance (32132)
47. Fourcès (32133)
48. Gaudonville (32139)
49. Gavarret-sur-Aulouste (32142)
50. Gazaupouy (32143)
51. Gimbrède (32146)
52. Gondrin (32149)
53. Goutz (32150)
54. Homps (32154)
55. Le Houga (32155)
56. L'Isle-Bouzon (32158)
57. Labrihe (32173)
58. Lagarde (32176)
59. Lagardère (32178)
60. Lagraulet-du-Gers (32180)
61. Lalanne (32184)
62. Lamothe-Goas (32188)
63. Lannemaignan (32189)
64. Lannepax (32190)
65. Lanne-Soubiran (32191)
66. Larée (32193)
67. Larressingle (32194)
68. Larroque-Engalin (32195)
69. Larroque-Saint-Sernin (32196)
70. Larroque-sur-l'Osse (32197)
71. Laujuzan (32202)
72. Lauraët (32203)
73. Lectoure (32208)
74. Lias-d'Armagnac (32211)
75. Ligardes (32212)
76. Loubédat (32214)
77. Luppé-Violles (32220)
78. Magnan (32222)
79. Magnas (32223)
80. Maignaut-Tauzia (32224)
81. Manciet (32227)
82. Mansempuy (32229)
83. Mansencôme (32230)
84. Maravat (32232)
85. Marguestau (32236)
86. Marsolan (32239)
87. Mas-d'Auvignon (32241)
88. Mauléon-d'Armagnac (32243)
89. Maupas (32246)
90. Mauroux (32248)
91. Mauvezin (32249)
92. Miradoux (32253)
93. Miramont-Latour (32255)
94. Monbrun (32262)
95. Monclar (32264)
96. Monfort (32269)
97. Monguilhem (32271)
98. Monlezun-d'Armagnac (32274)
99. Montestruc-sur-Gers (32286)
100. Montréal (32290)
101. Mormès (32291)
102. Mouchan (32292)
103. Nogaro (32296)
104. Noulens (32299)
105. Panjas (32305)
106. Pauilhac (32306)
107. Perchède (32310)
108. Pergain-Taillac (32311)
109. Pessoulens (32313)
110. Peyrecave (32314)
111. Pis (32318)
112. Plieux (32320)
113. Pouy-Roquelaure (32328)
114. Préchac (32329)
115. Puységur (32337)
116. Ramouzens (32338)
117. Réans (32340)
118. Réjaumont (32341)
119. La Romieu (32345)
120. Roquelaure-Saint-Aubin (32349)
121. Roquepine (32350)
122. Saint-Antoine (32358)
123. Saint-Antonin (32359)
124. Saint-Avit-Frandat (32364)
125. Saint-Brès (32366)
126. Saint-Clar (32370)
127. Saint-Créac (32371)
128. Saint-Cricq (32372)
129. Sainte-Anne (32357)
130. Sainte-Christie-d'Armagnac (32369)
131. Sainte-Gemme (32376)
132. Sainte-Mère (32395)
133. Sainte-Radegonde (32405)
134. Saint-Georges (32377)
135. Saint-Germier (32379)
136. Saint-Griède (32380)
137. Saint-Léonard (32385)
138. Saint-Martin-d'Armagnac (32390)
139. Saint-Martin-de-Goyne (32391)
140. Saint-Mézard (32396)
141. Saint-Orens (32399)
142. Saint-Orens-Pouy-Petit (32400)
143. Saint-Puy (32404)
144. Salles-d'Armagnac (32408)
145. Sarrant (32416)
146. La Sauvetat (32417)
147. Séailles (32423)
148. Sempesserre (32429)
149. Sérempuy (32431)
150. Sion (32434)
151. Sirac (32435)
152. Solomiac (32436)
153. Sorbets (32437)
154. Taybosc (32441)
155. Terraube (32442)
156. Thoux (32444)
157. Touget (32448)
158. Toujouse (32449)
159. Tournecoupe (32452)
160. Urdens (32457)
161. Urgosse (32458)
162. Valence-sur-Baïse (32459)

== History ==
The arrondissement of Condom was created in 1800. At the January 2017 reorganisation of the arrondissements of Gers, it gained 13 communes from the arrondissement of Auch, and it lost nine communes to the arrondissement of Auch.

As a result of the reorganisation of the cantons of France which came into effect in 2015, the borders of the cantons are no longer related to the borders of the arrondissements. The cantons of the arrondissement of Condom were, as of January 2015:

1. Cazaubon
2. Condom
3. Eauze
4. Fleurance
5. Lectoure
6. Mauvezin
7. Miradoux
8. Montréal
9. Nogaro
10. Saint-Clar
11. Valence-sur-Baïse
