= Gaudonville =

- Commune
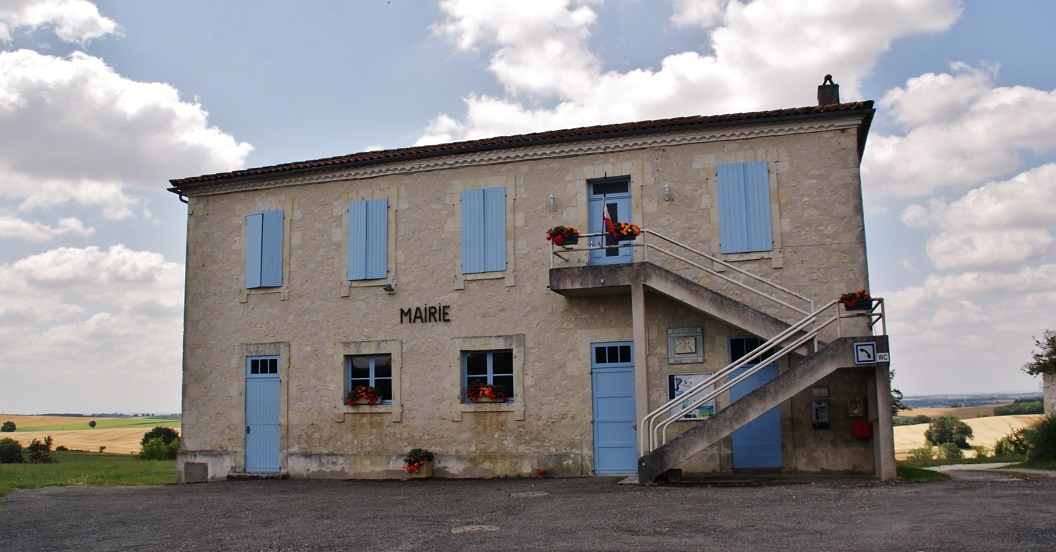
- The town hall in Gaudonville

- Coat of arms
- Location of Gaudonville
- Location within France Location within Occitanie
- Coordinates: 43°53′08″N 0°50′49″E
- Country: France
- Region: Occitania
- Department: Gers
- Arrondissement: Condom
- Canton: Fleurance-Lomagne

Government
  - Mayor (2020–2026): Pascal Noby
- Area^{1}: 7.39 km^{2} (2.85 sq mi)
- Elevation: 205 m (673 ft)
- Highest elevation: 265 m (869 ft)
- Lowest elevation: 121 m (397 ft)
- Population (2023): 101
  - Density: 13.7/km^{2} (35.4/sq mi)
- Time zone: UTC+01:00 (CET)
  - Summer (DST): UTC+02:00 (CEST)
- INSEE/Postal code: 32139 /32380
- ^{1} French Land Register data, which excludes lakes, ponds, glaciers > 1 km^{2} (0.386 sq mi or 247 acres) and river estuaries.

Gaudonville (French pronunciation: [ɡodɔ̃vil]; Occitan: Gaudonvila) is a commune in the Gers department in southwestern France.

== Geography ==
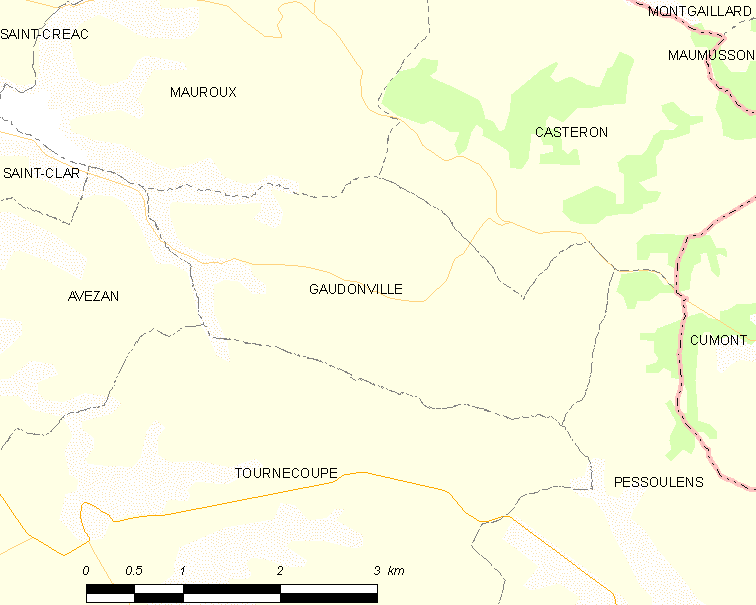
Gaudonville and its surrounding communes

== Population ==
Historical population
Year	Pop.	±% p.a.
1968	155	—
1975	129	−2.59%
1982	132	+0.33%
1990	122	−0.98%
1999	103	−1.86%
2007	107	+0.48%
2012	119	+2.15%
2017	111	−1.38%
2023	101	−1.56%
Source: INSEE

== See also ==
- Communes of the Gers department
