= Canton of Fleurance-Lomagne =

Administrative division of Gers department, France

Coordinates: 43.85°N 0.66°E

The canton of Fleurance-Lomagne is an administrative division of the Gers department, southwestern France. It was created at the French canton reorganisation which came into effect in March 2015. Its seat is in Fleurance.

It consists of the following communes:

1. Avezan
2. Bivès
3. Brugnens
4. Cadeilhan
5. Castelnau-d'Arbieu
6. Castéron
7. Céran
8. Cézan
9. Estramiac
10. Fleurance
11. Gaudonville
12. Gavarret-sur-Aulouste
13. Goutz
14. Lalanne
15. Lamothe-Goas
16. Magnas
17. Mauroux
18. Miramont-Latour
19. Montestruc-sur-Gers
20. Pauilhac
21. Pessoulens
22. Pis
23. Préchac
24. Puységur
25. Réjaumont
26. Saint-Clar
27. Saint-Créac
28. Sainte-Radegonde
29. Saint-Léonard
30. La Sauvetat
31. Taybosc
32. Tournecoupe
33. Urdens
