= Maupas, Gers =

Maupas
- Commune
- Location of Maupas
- Location within France Location within Occitanie
- Coordinates: 43°50′52″N 0°08′04″W
- Country: France
- Region: Occitania
- Department: Gers
- Arrondissement: Condom
- Canton: Grand-Bas-Armagnac
- Intercommunality: Grand-Armagnac

Government
  - Mayor (2021–2026): Pierrette Lafargue
- Area^{1}: 9.85 km^{2} (3.80 sq mi)
- Elevation: 116 m (381 ft)
- Highest elevation: 136 m (446 ft)
- Lowest elevation: 70 m (230 ft)
- Population (2023): 198
  - Density: 20.1/km^{2} (52.1/sq mi)
- Time zone: UTC+01:00 (CET)
  - Summer (DST): UTC+02:00 (CEST)
- INSEE/Postal code: 32246 /32240
- ^{1} French Land Register data, which excludes lakes, ponds, glaciers > 1 km^{2} (0.386 sq mi or 247 acres) and river estuaries.

Maupas is a commune in the Gers department in southwestern France.

== Geography ==
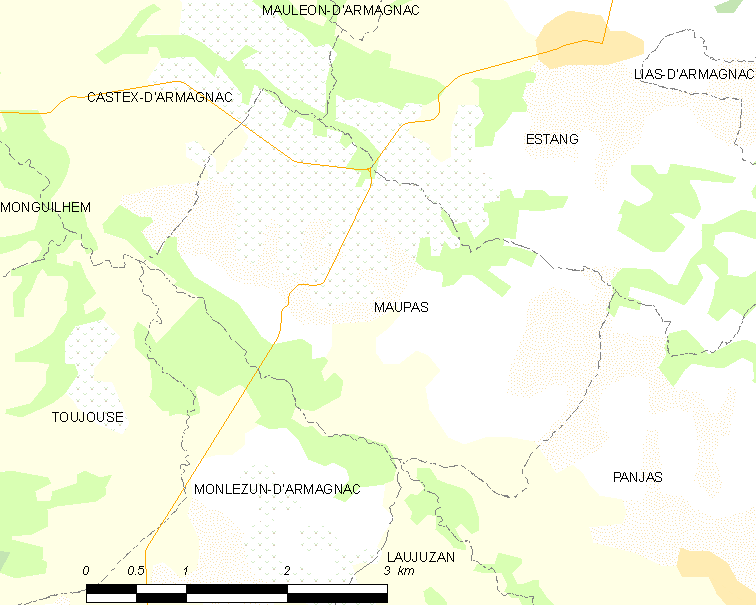
Maupas and its surrounding communes

== Population ==
Historical population
Year	Pop.	±% p.a.
1968	265	—
1975	239	−1.46%
1982	225	−0.86%
1990	206	−1.10%
1999	212	+0.32%
2007	198	−0.85%
2012	195	−0.30%
2017	203	+0.81%
2023	198	−0.41%
Source: INSEE

== See also ==
- Communes of the Gers department
