= Estramiac =

- Commune
- Location of Estramiac
- Location within France Location within Occitanie
- Coordinates: 43°50′13″N 0°50′58″E
- Country: France
- Region: Occitania
- Department: Gers
- Arrondissement: Condom
- Canton: Fleurance-Lomagne

Government
  - Mayor (2020–2026): Nicolas Goulard
- Area^{1}: 9.69 km^{2} (3.74 sq mi)
- Elevation: 178 m (584 ft)
- Highest elevation: 212 m (696 ft)
- Lowest elevation: 106 m (348 ft)
- Population (2023): 119
  - Density: 12.3/km^{2} (31.8/sq mi)
- Time zone: UTC+01:00 (CET)
  - Summer (DST): UTC+02:00 (CEST)
- INSEE/Postal code: 32129 /32380
- ^{1} French Land Register data, which excludes lakes, ponds, glaciers > 1 km^{2} (0.386 sq mi or 247 acres) and river estuaries.

Estramiac (French pronunciation: [ɛstʁamjak]) is a commune in the Gers department in southwestern France.

== Geography ==
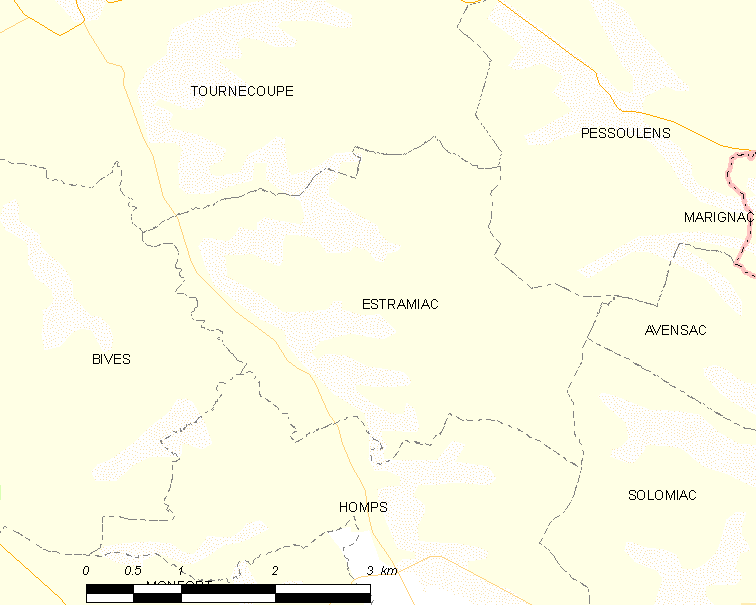
Estramiac and its surrounding communes

== Population ==
Historical population
Year	Pop.	±% p.a.
1968	211	—
1975	195	−1.12%
1982	179	−1.22%
1990	160	−1.39%
1999	132	−2.11%
2007	132	+0.00%
2012	136	+0.60%
2017	142	+0.87%
2023	119	−2.90%
Source: INSEE

== See also ==
- Communes of the Gers department
