= Castéron =

- Commune
- Coat of arms
- Location of Castéron
- Location within France Location within Occitanie
- Coordinates: 43°53′34″N 0°51′42″E
- Country: France
- Region: Occitania
- Department: Gers
- Arrondissement: Condom
- Canton: Fleurance-Lomagne

Government
  - Mayor (2020–2026): Christiane Pieters
- Area^{1}: 11.08 km^{2} (4.28 sq mi)
- Elevation: 266 m (873 ft)
- Highest elevation: 267 m (876 ft)
- Lowest elevation: 165 m (541 ft)
- Population (2023): 54
  - Density: 4.9/km^{2} (13/sq mi)
- Time zone: UTC+01:00 (CET)
  - Summer (DST): UTC+02:00 (CEST)
- INSEE/Postal code: 32084 /32380
- ^{1} French Land Register data, which excludes lakes, ponds, glaciers > 1 km^{2} (0.386 sq mi or 247 acres) and river estuaries.

Castéron (French pronunciation: [kasteʁɔ̃]; Occitan: Lo Casteron) is a commune in the Gers department in southwestern France.

== Geography ==
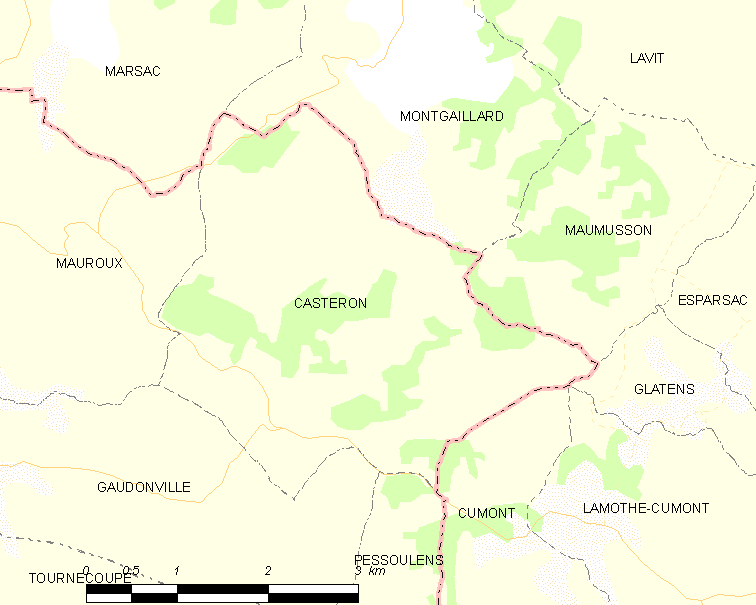
Castéron and its surrounding communes

== Population ==
Historical population
Year	Pop.	±% p.a.
1968	128	—
1975	116	−1.40%
1982	97	−2.52%
1990	67	−4.52%
1999	58	−1.59%
2007	70	+2.38%
2012	59	−3.36%
2017	52	−2.49%
2023	54	+0.63%
Source: INSEE

== See also ==
- Communes of the Gers department
