= La Sauvetat, Gers =

La Sauvetat
- Commune
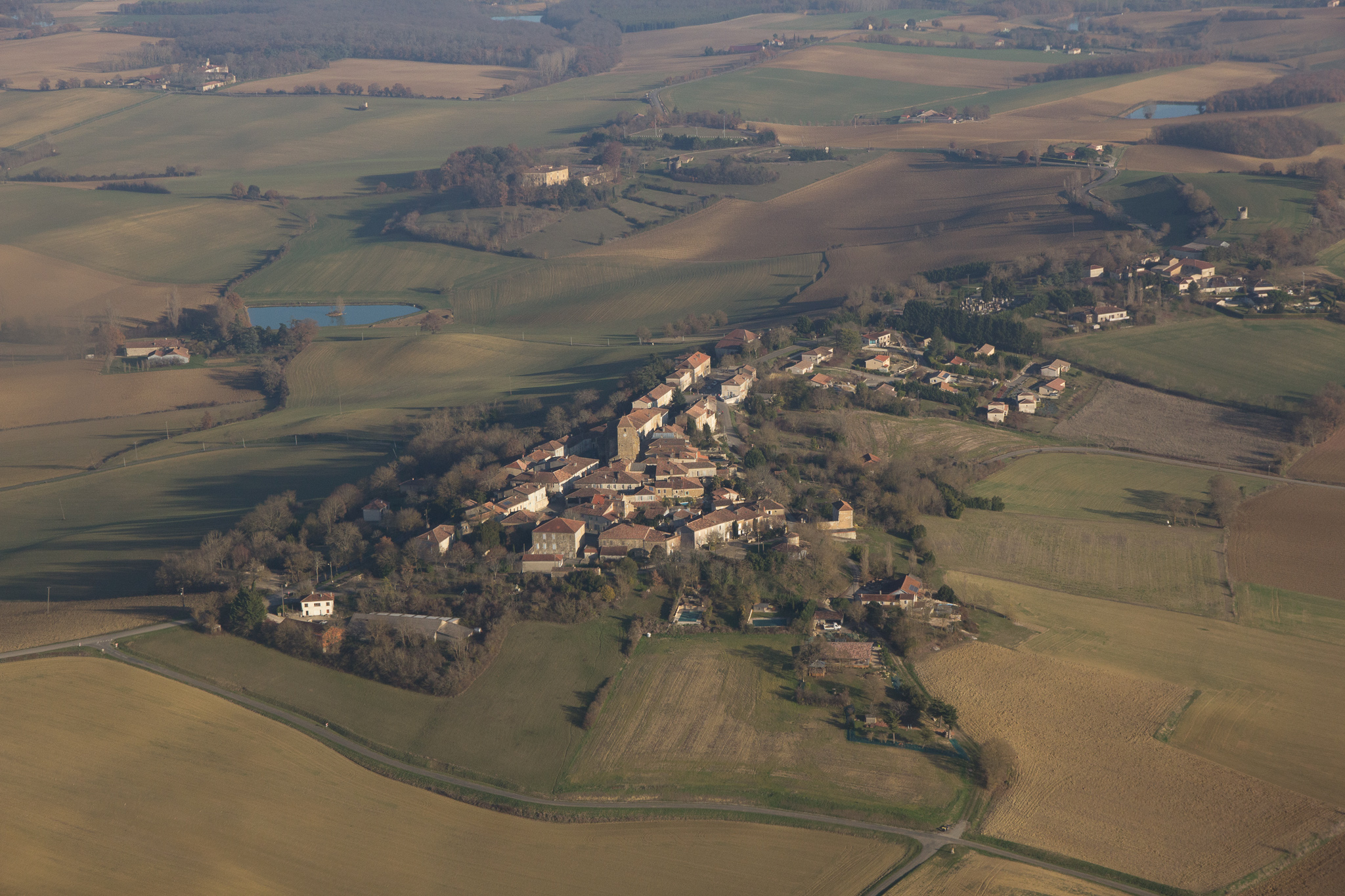
- An aerial view of La Sauvetat

- Coat of arms
- Location of La Sauvetat
- Location within France Location within Occitanie
- Coordinates: 43°51′16″N 0°31′35″E
- Country: France
- Region: Occitania
- Department: Gers
- Arrondissement: Condom
- Canton: Fleurance-Lomagne
- Intercommunality: Lomagne Gersoise

Government
  - Mayor (2024–2026): Bernard Lacoste
- Area^{1}: 27.71 km^{2} (10.70 sq mi)
- Elevation: 290 m (950 ft)
- Highest elevation: 242 m (794 ft)
- Lowest elevation: 95 m (312 ft)
- Population (2023): 403
  - Density: 14.5/km^{2} (37.7/sq mi)
- Time zone: UTC+01:00 (CET)
  - Summer (DST): UTC+02:00 (CEST)
- INSEE/Postal code: 32417 /32500
- ^{1} French Land Register data, which excludes lakes, ponds, glaciers > 1 km^{2} (0.386 sq mi or 247 acres) and river estuaries.

La Sauvetat (French pronunciation: [la sovta]; la Sauvedat in Occitan) is a commune in the Gers department in southwestern France.

== Geography ==
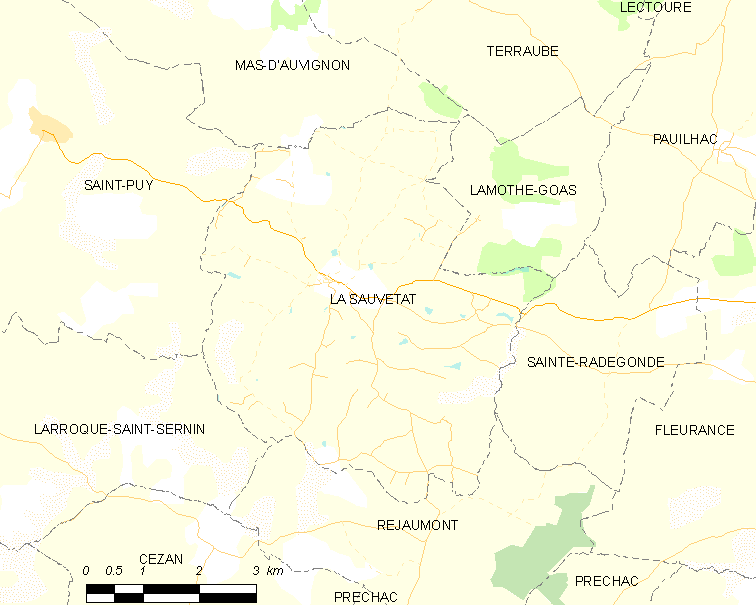
La Sauvetat and its surrounding communes

== Population ==
Historical population
Year	Pop.	±% p.a.
1968	497	—
1975	436	−1.85%
1982	357	−2.82%
1990	342	−0.54%
1999	335	−0.23%
2007	359	+0.87%
2012	351	−0.45%
2017	368	+0.95%
2023	403	+1.53%
Source: INSEE

== See also ==
- Communes of the Gers department
