= Saint-Créac, Gers =

Saint-Créac
- Commune
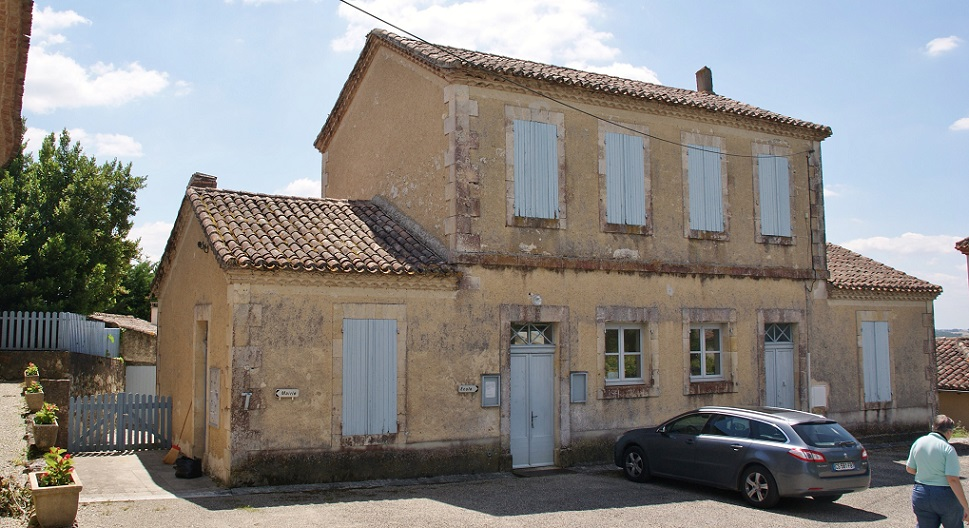
- The town hall in Saint-Créac
- Location of Saint-Créac
- Location within France Location within Occitanie
- Coordinates: 43°55′21″N 0°48′09″E
- Country: France
- Region: Occitania
- Department: Gers
- Arrondissement: Condom
- Canton: Fleurance-Lomagne

Government
  - Mayor (2020–2026): Vincent Bégué
- Area^{1}: 8.37 km^{2} (3.23 sq mi)
- Elevation: 262 m (860 ft)
- Highest elevation: 252 m (827 ft)
- Lowest elevation: 90 m (300 ft)
- Population (2023): 86
  - Density: 10/km^{2} (27/sq mi)
- Time zone: UTC+01:00 (CET)
  - Summer (DST): UTC+02:00 (CEST)
- INSEE/Postal code: 32371 /32380
- ^{1} French Land Register data, which excludes lakes, ponds, glaciers > 1 km^{2} (0.386 sq mi or 247 acres) and river estuaries.

Saint-Créac (French pronunciation: [sɛ̃ kʁeak]; Occitan: Sent Criac) is a commune in the Gers department in southwestern France.

== Geography ==
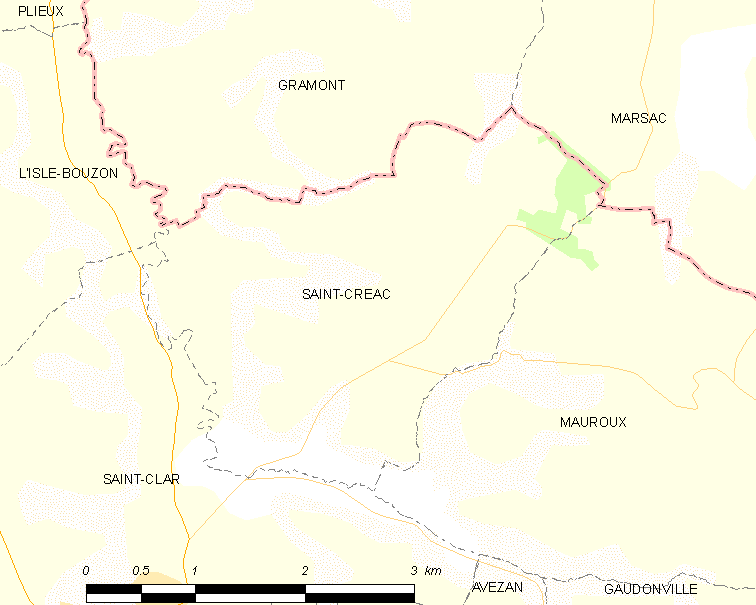
Saint-Créac and its surrounding communes

== Population ==
Historical population
Year	Pop.	±% p.a.
1968	135	—
1975	119	−1.79%
1982	135	+1.82%
1990	114	−2.09%
1999	100	−1.45%
2007	103	+0.37%
2012	104	+0.19%
2017	83	−4.41%
2023	86	+0.59%
Source: INSEE

== See also ==
- Communes of the Gers department
