= Puységur, Gers =

Puységur
- Commune
- Location of Puységur
- Location within France Location within Occitanie
- Coordinates: 43°46′37″N 0°36′18″E
- Country: France
- Region: Occitania
- Department: Gers
- Arrondissement: Condom
- Canton: Fleurance-Lomagne
- Intercommunality: Lomagne Gersoise

Government
  - Mayor (2020–2026): Danièle Guilbert
- Area^{1}: 7.26 km^{2} (2.80 sq mi)
- Elevation: 150 m (490 ft)
- Highest elevation: 191 m (627 ft)
- Lowest elevation: 100 m (330 ft)
- Population (2023): 72
  - Density: 9.9/km^{2} (26/sq mi)
- Time zone: UTC+01:00 (CET)
  - Summer (DST): UTC+02:00 (CEST)
- INSEE/Postal code: 32337 /32390
- ^{1} French Land Register data, which excludes lakes, ponds, glaciers > 1 km^{2} (0.386 sq mi or 247 acres) and river estuaries.

Puységur (French pronunciation: [pɥiseɡyʁ]; Occitan: Poishegur) is a commune in the Gers department in southwestern France.

== Geography ==
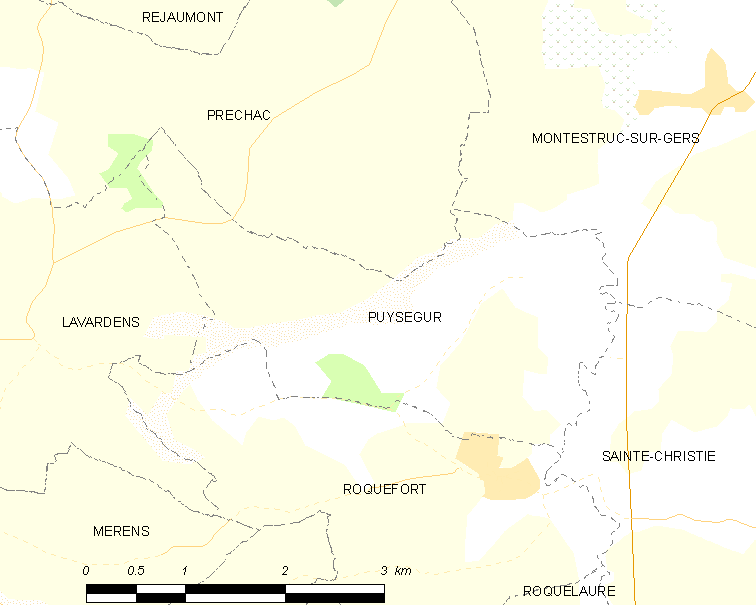
Puységur and its surrounding communes

== Population ==
Historical population
Year	Pop.	±% p.a.
1968	51	—
1975	67	+3.98%
1982	76	+1.82%
1990	90	+2.14%
1999	80	−1.30%
2007	72	−1.31%
2012	76	+1.09%
2017	75	−0.26%
2023	72	−0.68%
Source: INSEE

== See also ==
- Communes of the Gers department
