= Sorbets =

Sorbets may refer to the following places in France:

- Sorbets, Gers, a commune in the Gers department
- Sorbets, Landes, a commune in the Landes department

== See also ==
- Sorbet
