= Perchède =

- Commune
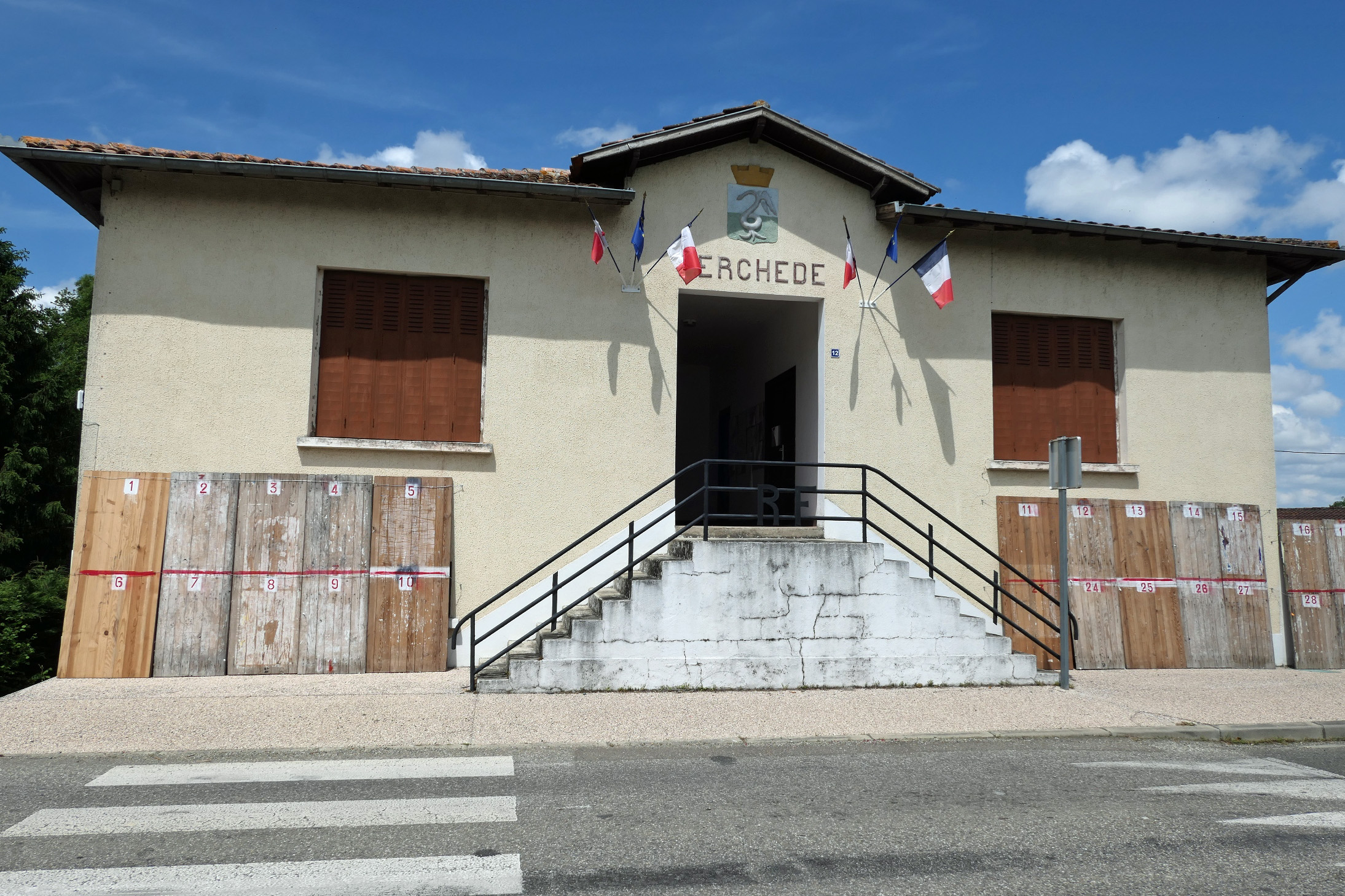
- Town hall
- Location of Perchède
- Location within France Location within Occitanie
- Coordinates: 43°46′40″N 0°08′10″W
- Country: France
- Region: Occitania
- Department: Gers
- Arrondissement: Condom
- Canton: Grand-Bas-Armagnac

Government
  - Mayor (2020–2026): Christian Cuvellier
- Area^{1}: 5.25 km^{2} (2.03 sq mi)
- Elevation: 128 m (420 ft)
- Highest elevation: 131 m (430 ft)
- Lowest elevation: 81 m (266 ft)
- Population (2023): 104
  - Density: 19.8/km^{2} (51.3/sq mi)
- Time zone: UTC+01:00 (CET)
  - Summer (DST): UTC+02:00 (CEST)
- INSEE/Postal code: 32310 /32460
- ^{1} French Land Register data, which excludes lakes, ponds, glaciers > 1 km^{2} (0.386 sq mi or 247 acres) and river estuaries.

Perchède (French pronunciation: [pɛʁʃɛd]; Occitan: Persheda) is a commune in the Gers department in southwestern France, bordering the Ruisseau l'Izaute.

== Geography ==
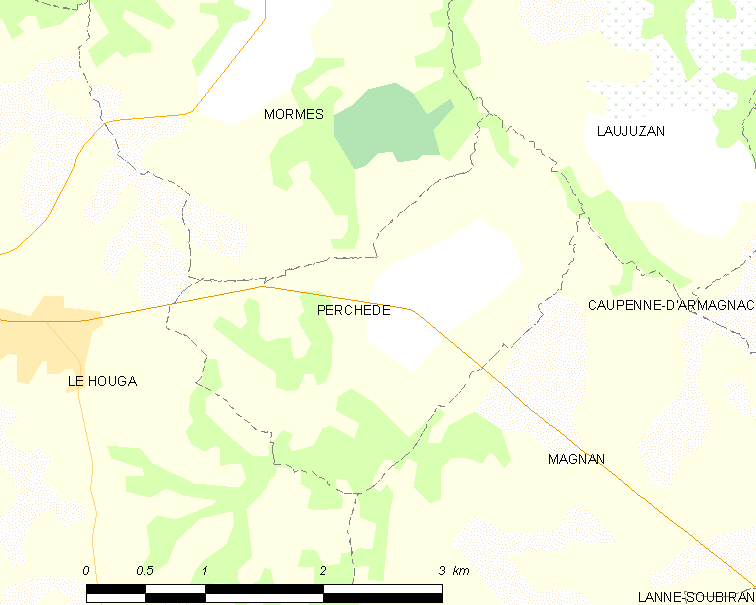
Perchède and its surrounding communes

== Population ==
Historical population
Year	Pop.	±% p.a.
1968	83	—
1975	79	−0.70%
1982	83	+0.71%
1990	82	−0.15%
1999	74	−1.13%
2007	77	+0.50%
2012	91	+3.40%
2017	118	+5.33%
2023	104	−2.08%
Source: INSEE

== See also ==
- Communes of the Gers department
