= Campagne-d'Armagnac =

- Commune
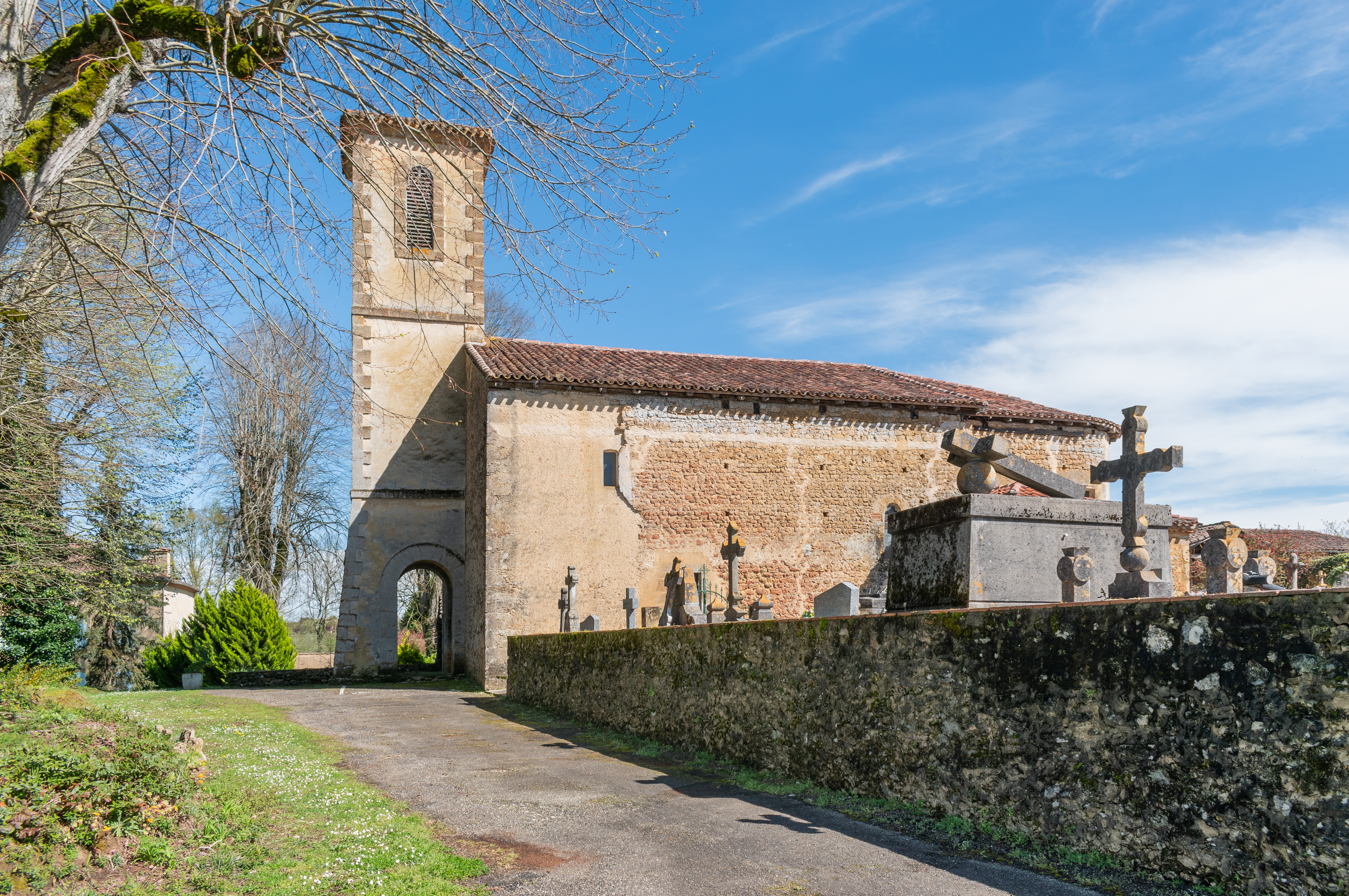
- Location of Campagne-d'Armagnac
- Location within France Location within Occitanie
- Coordinates: 43°51′54″N 0°00′00″E
- Country: France
- Region: Occitania
- Department: Gers
- Arrondissement: Condom
- Canton: Grand-Bas-Armagnac
- Intercommunality: Grand-Armagnac

Government
  - Mayor (2020–2026): Claude Vettor
- Area^{1}: 5.49 km^{2} (2.12 sq mi)
- Elevation: 126 m (413 ft)
- Highest elevation: 155 m (509 ft)
- Lowest elevation: 104 m (341 ft)
- Population (2023): 213
  - Density: 38.8/km^{2} (100/sq mi)
- Time zone: UTC+01:00 (CET)
  - Summer (DST): UTC+02:00 (CEST)
- INSEE/Postal code: 32073 /32800
- ^{1} French Land Register data, which excludes lakes, ponds, glaciers > 1 km^{2} (0.386 sq mi or 247 acres) and river estuaries.

Campagne-d'Armagnac (French pronunciation: [kɑ̃paɲ daʁmaɲak]; Occitan: Campanha d'Armanhac) is a commune in the Gers department in southwestern France.

== Geography ==
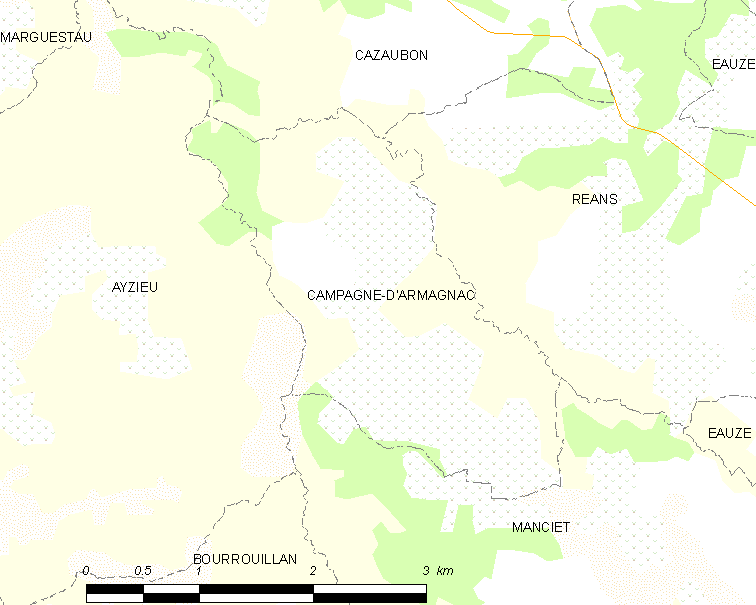
Campagne-d'Armagnac and its surrounding communes

== Population ==
Historical population
Year	Pop.	±% p.a.
1968	255	—
1975	207	−2.94%
1982	188	−1.37%
1990	176	−0.82%
1999	167	−0.58%
2007	202	+2.41%
2012	207	+0.49%
2017	224	+1.59%
2023	213	−0.84%
Source: INSEE

== See also ==
- Communes of the Gers department
