= Castex-d'Armagnac =

- Commune
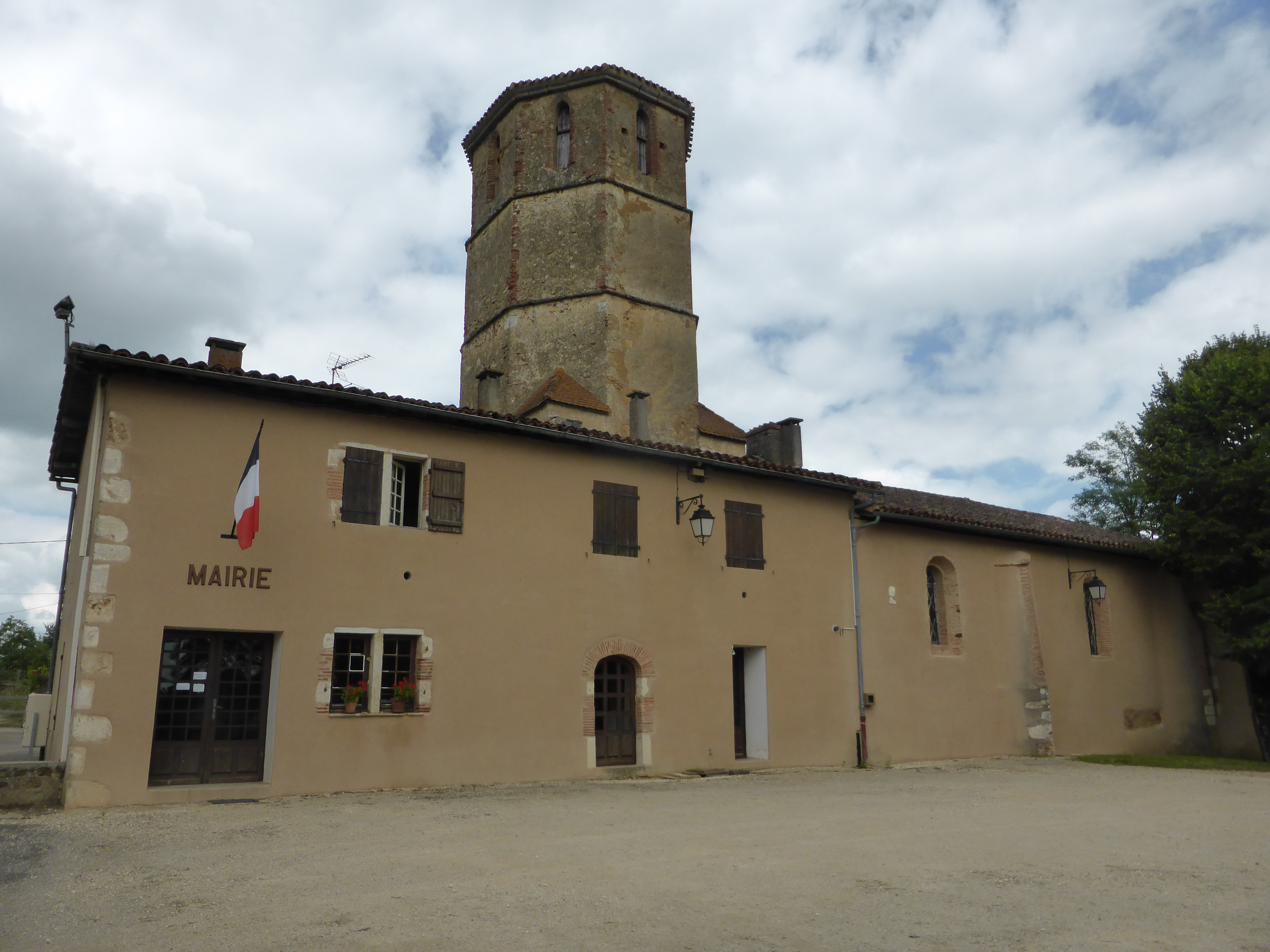
- The town hall in Castex-d'Armagnac
- Location of Castex-d'Armagnac
- Location within France Location within Occitanie
- Coordinates: 43°52′14″N 0°09′56″W
- Country: France
- Region: Occitania
- Department: Gers
- Arrondissement: Condom
- Canton: Grand-Bas-Armagnac
- Intercommunality: Grand-Armagnac

Government
  - Mayor (2020–2026): Christian Dupouy
- Area^{1}: 12.26 km^{2} (4.73 sq mi)
- Elevation: 117 m (384 ft)
- Highest elevation: 124 m (407 ft)
- Lowest elevation: 65 m (213 ft)
- Population (2023): 144
  - Density: 11.7/km^{2} (30.4/sq mi)
- Time zone: UTC+01:00 (CET)
  - Summer (DST): UTC+02:00 (CEST)
- INSEE/Postal code: 32087 /32240
- ^{1} French Land Register data, which excludes lakes, ponds, glaciers > 1 km^{2} (0.386 sq mi or 247 acres) and river estuaries.

Castex-d'Armagnac (French pronunciation: [kastɛks daʁmaɲak], literally Castex of Armagnac; Occitan: Castèths d'Armanhac) is a commune in the Gers department in southwestern France.

== Geography ==
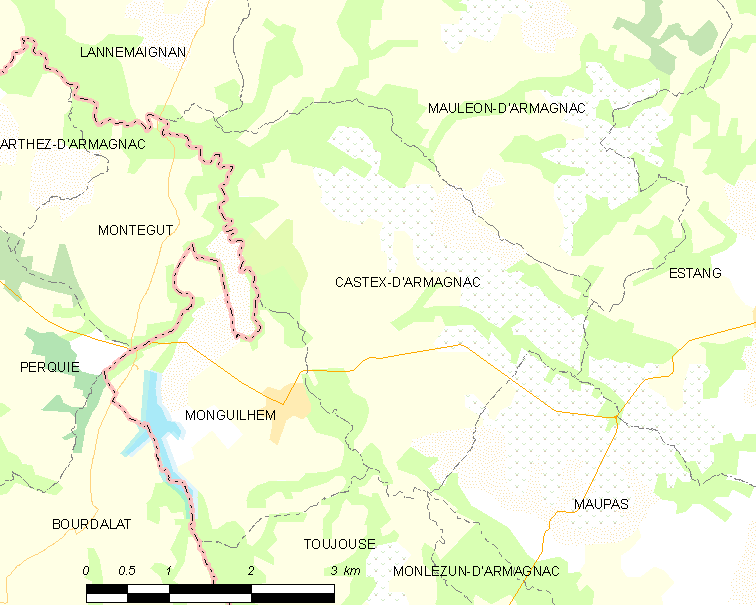
Castex-d'Armagnac and its surrounding communes

== Population ==
Historical population
Year	Pop.	±% p.a.
1968	156	—
1975	142	−1.33%
1982	128	−1.47%
1990	121	−0.70%
1999	111	−0.95%
2007	110	−0.11%
2012	95	−2.89%
2017	112	+3.35%
2023	144	+4.28%
Source: INSEE

== See also ==
- Communes of the Gers department
