= Laujuzan =

- Commune
- Location of Laujuzan
- Location within France Location within Occitanie
- Coordinates: 43°48′27″N 0°06′51″W
- Country: France
- Region: Occitania
- Department: Gers
- Arrondissement: Condom
- Canton: Grand-Bas-Armagnac
- Intercommunality: Bas-Armagnac

Government
  - Mayor (2020–2026): Patrick Lassalle
- Area^{1}: 11.34 km^{2} (4.38 sq mi)
- Elevation: 172 m (564 ft)
- Highest elevation: 138 m (453 ft)
- Lowest elevation: 74 m (243 ft)
- Population (2023): 294
  - Density: 25.9/km^{2} (67.1/sq mi)
- Time zone: UTC+01:00 (CET)
  - Summer (DST): UTC+02:00 (CEST)
- INSEE/Postal code: 32202 /32110
- ^{1} French Land Register data, which excludes lakes, ponds, glaciers > 1 km^{2} (0.386 sq mi or 247 acres) and river estuaries.

Laujuzan (French pronunciation: [loʒyzɑ̃]; Occitan: Laur Jusan) is a commune in the Gers department in southwestern France.

== Geography ==
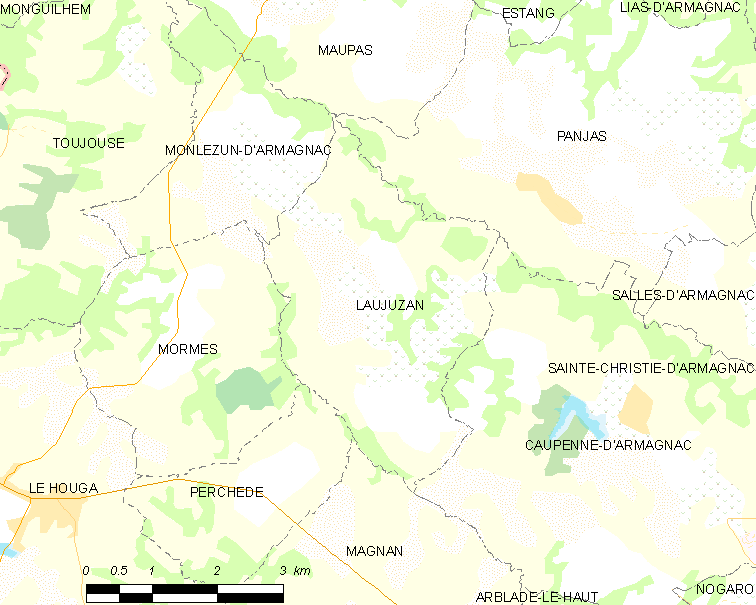
Laujuzan and its surrounding communes

== Population ==
Historical population
Year	Pop.	±% p.a.
1968	283	—
1975	262	−1.10%
1982	242	−1.13%
1990	245	+0.15%
1999	226	−0.89%
2007	232	+0.33%
2012	255	+1.91%
2017	279	+1.82%
2023	294	+0.88%
Source: INSEE

== See also ==
- Communes of the Gers department
