= Luppé-Violles =

- Commune
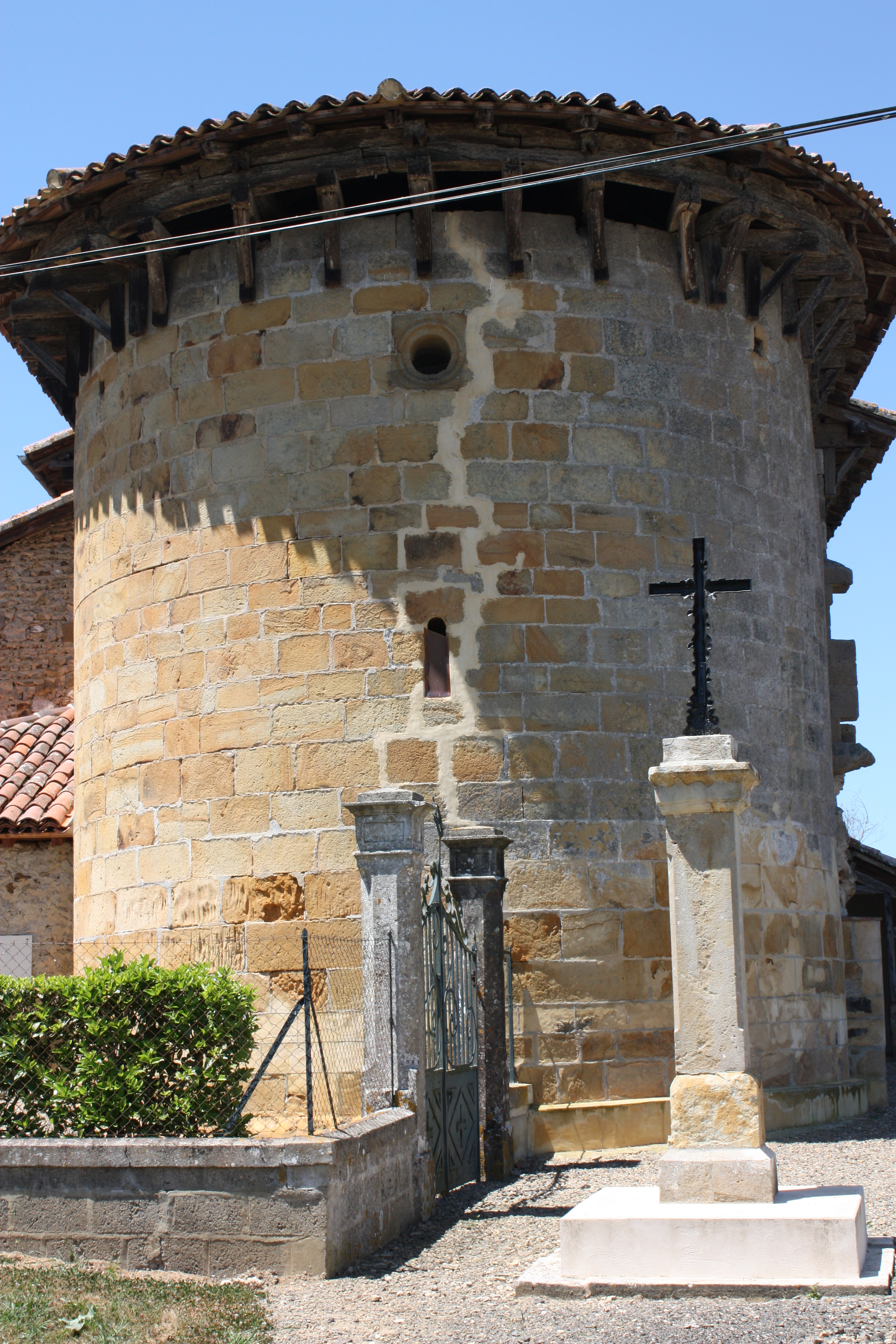
- The church in Luppé-Violles
- Location of Luppé-Violles
- Location within France Location within Occitanie
- Coordinates: 43°44′24″N 0°07′55″W
- Country: France
- Region: Occitania
- Department: Gers
- Arrondissement: Condom
- Canton: Grand-Bas-Armagnac
- Intercommunality: Bas-Armagnac

Government
  - Mayor (2020–2026): David Lacoste
- Area^{1}: 7.57 km^{2} (2.92 sq mi)
- Elevation: 141 m (463 ft)
- Highest elevation: 166 m (545 ft)
- Lowest elevation: 96 m (315 ft)
- Population (2023): 133
  - Density: 17.6/km^{2} (45.5/sq mi)
- Time zone: UTC+01:00 (CET)
  - Summer (DST): UTC+02:00 (CEST)
- INSEE/Postal code: 32220 /32110
- ^{1} French Land Register data, which excludes lakes, ponds, glaciers > 1 km^{2} (0.386 sq mi or 247 acres) and river estuaries.

Luppé-Violles (French pronunciation: [lype vjɔl]; Occitan: Lupèr e Viòlas) is a commune in the Gers department in southwestern France.

== Geography ==
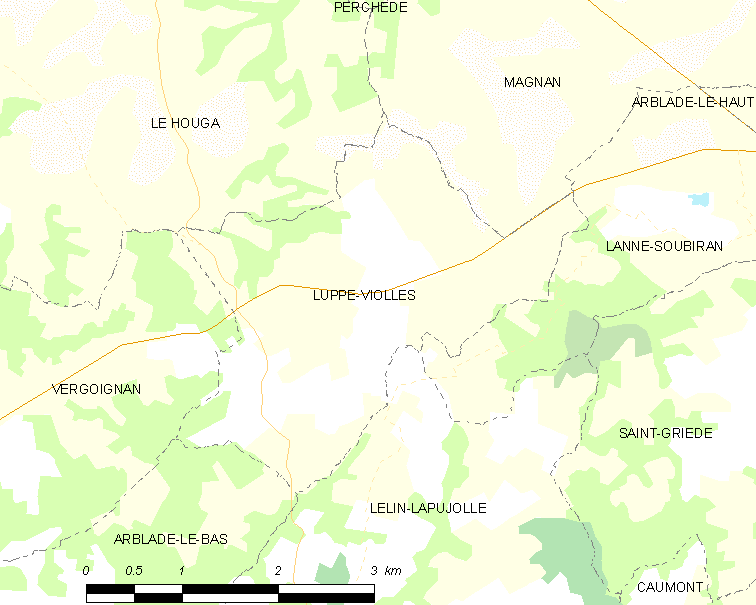
Luppé-Violles and its surrounding communes

== Population ==
Historical population
Year	Pop.	±% p.a.
1968	172	—
1975	150	−1.94%
1982	136	−1.39%
1990	129	−0.66%
1999	125	−0.35%
2007	138	+1.24%
2012	150	+1.68%
2017	157	+0.92%
2023	133	−2.73%
Source: INSEE

== See also ==
- Communes of the Gers department
