= Lias-d'Armagnac =

- Commune
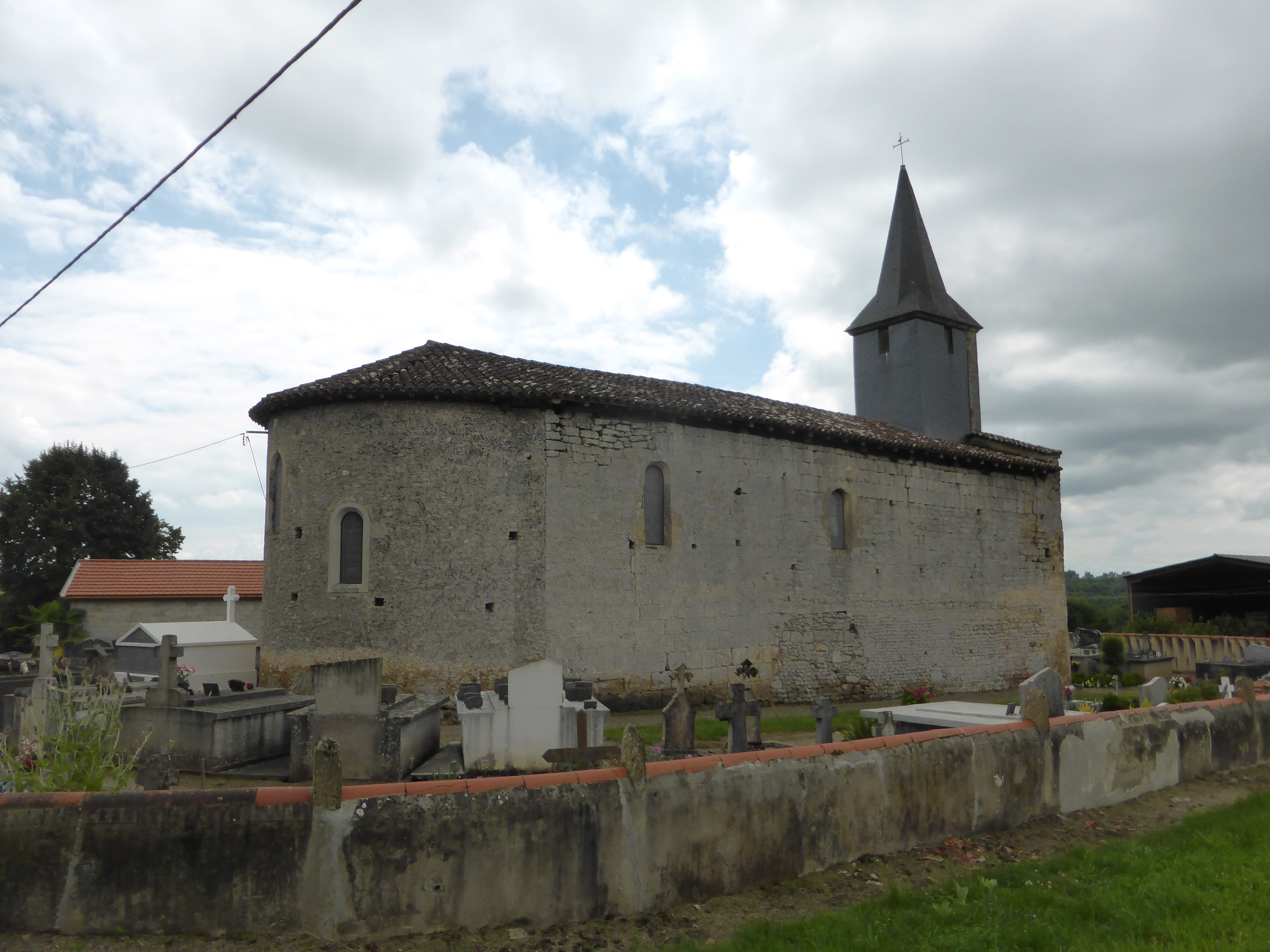
- The church in Lias-d'Armagnac
- Location of Lias-d'Armagnac
- Location within France Location within Occitanie
- Coordinates: 43°51′52″N 0°04′19″W
- Country: France
- Region: Occitania
- Department: Gers
- Arrondissement: Condom
- Canton: Grand-Bas-Armagnac
- Intercommunality: Grand-Armagnac

Government
  - Mayor (2020–2026): Bernard Pandelé
- Area^{1}: 11.92 km^{2} (4.60 sq mi)
- Elevation: 115 m (377 ft)
- Highest elevation: 186 m (610 ft)
- Lowest elevation: 92 m (302 ft)
- Population (2023): 201
  - Density: 16.9/km^{2} (43.7/sq mi)
- Time zone: UTC+01:00 (CET)
  - Summer (DST): UTC+02:00 (CEST)
- INSEE/Postal code: 32211 /32240
- ^{1} French Land Register data, which excludes lakes, ponds, glaciers > 1 km^{2} (0.386 sq mi or 247 acres) and river estuaries.

Lias-d'Armagnac is a commune in the Gers department in southwestern France.

== Geography ==
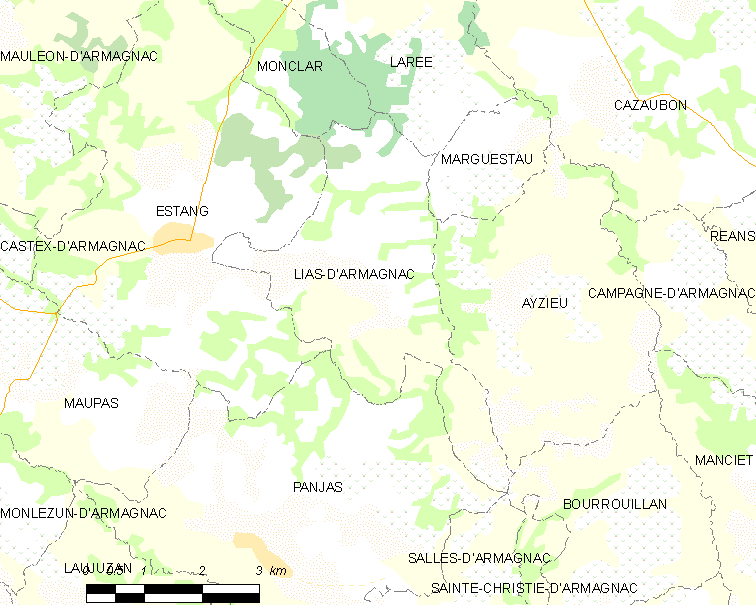
Lias-d'Armagnac and its surrounding communes

== Population ==
Historical population
Year	Pop.	±% p.a.
1968	246	—
1975	230	−0.96%
1982	205	−1.63%
1990	189	−1.01%
1999	183	−0.36%
2007	189	+0.40%
2012	200	+1.14%
2017	196	−0.40%
2023	201	+0.42%
Source: INSEE

== See also ==
- Communes of the Gers department
