= Larée =

- Commune
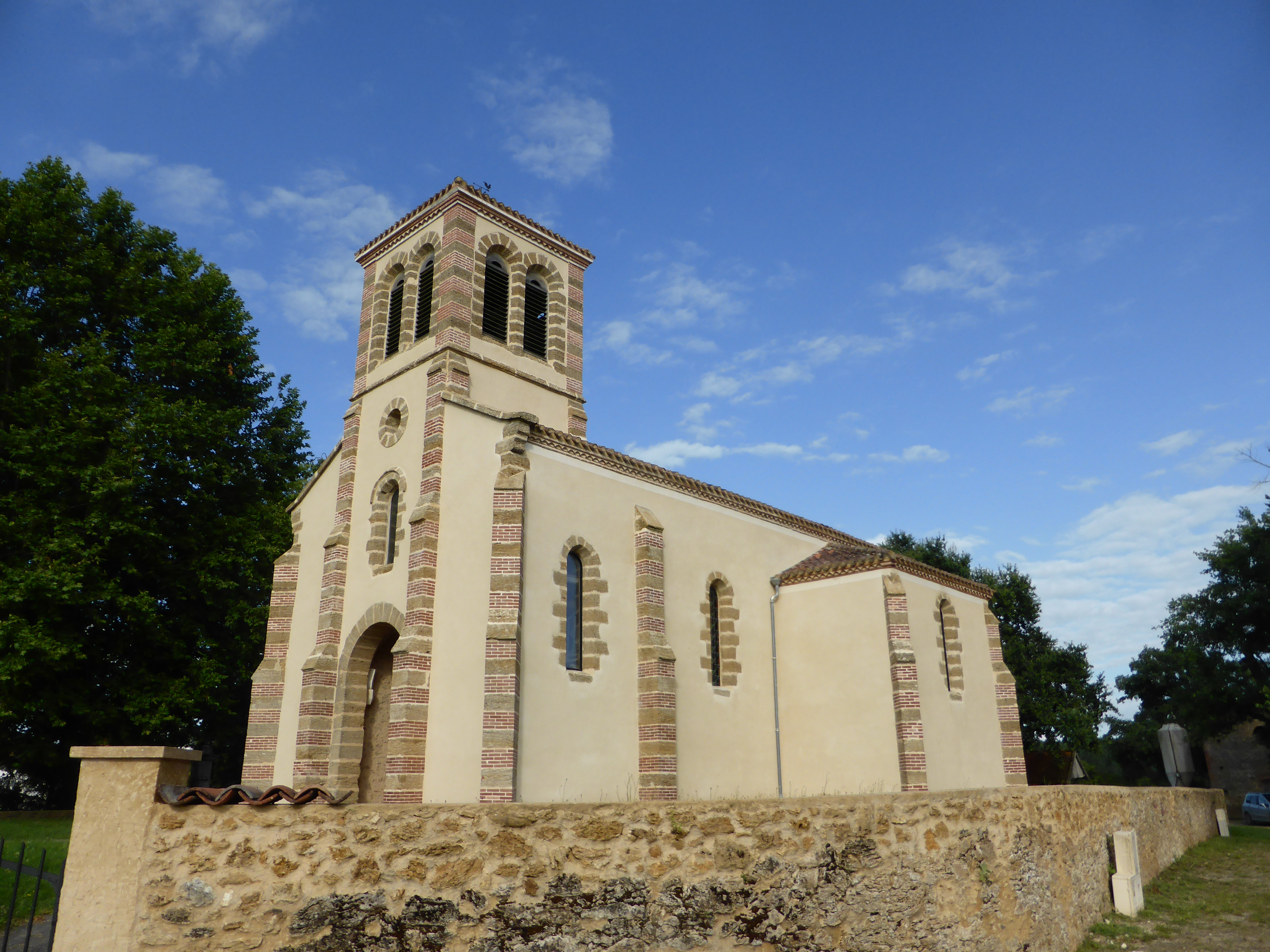
- The church in Larée
- Location of Larée
- Location within France Location within Occitanie
- Coordinates: 43°54′30″N 0°02′57″W
- Country: France
- Region: Occitania
- Department: Gers
- Arrondissement: Condom
- Canton: Grand-Bas-Armagnac
- Intercommunality: Grand-Armagnac

Government
  - Mayor (2020–2026): Franck Barsacq
- Area^{1}: 12.87 km^{2} (4.97 sq mi)
- Elevation: 92 m (302 ft)
- Highest elevation: 153 m (502 ft)
- Lowest elevation: 98 m (322 ft)
- Population (2023): 237
  - Density: 18.4/km^{2} (47.7/sq mi)
- Time zone: UTC+01:00 (CET)
  - Summer (DST): UTC+02:00 (CEST)
- INSEE/Postal code: 32193 /32150
- ^{1} French Land Register data, which excludes lakes, ponds, glaciers > 1 km^{2} (0.386 sq mi or 247 acres) and river estuaries.

Larée (French pronunciation: [laʁe]; Occitan: L'Arrea) is a commune in the Gers department in southwestern France.

== Geography ==
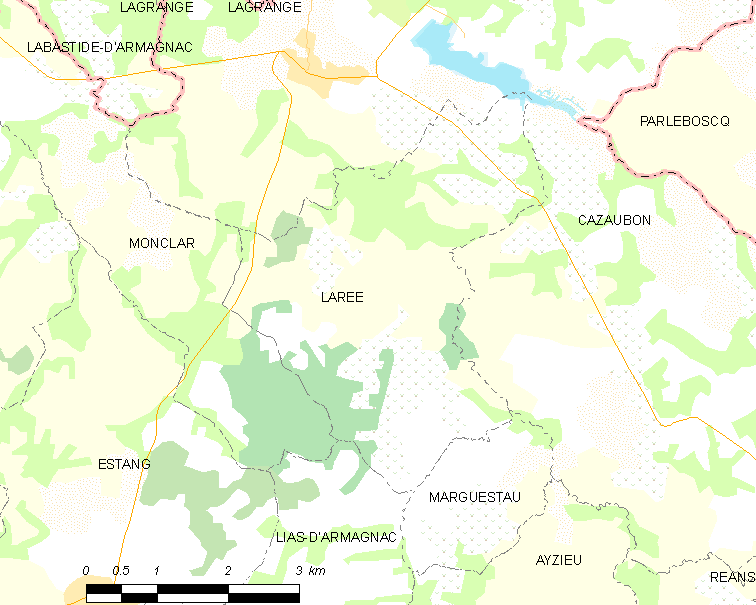
Larée and its surrounding communes

== Population ==
Historical population
Year	Pop.	±% p.a.
1968	273	—
1975	255	−0.97%
1982	223	−1.90%
1990	230	+0.39%
1999	234	+0.19%
2007	232	−0.11%
2012	235	+0.26%
2017	230	−0.43%
2023	237	+0.50%
Source: INSEE

== See also ==
- Communes of the Gers department
