= Arblade-le-Haut =

- Commune
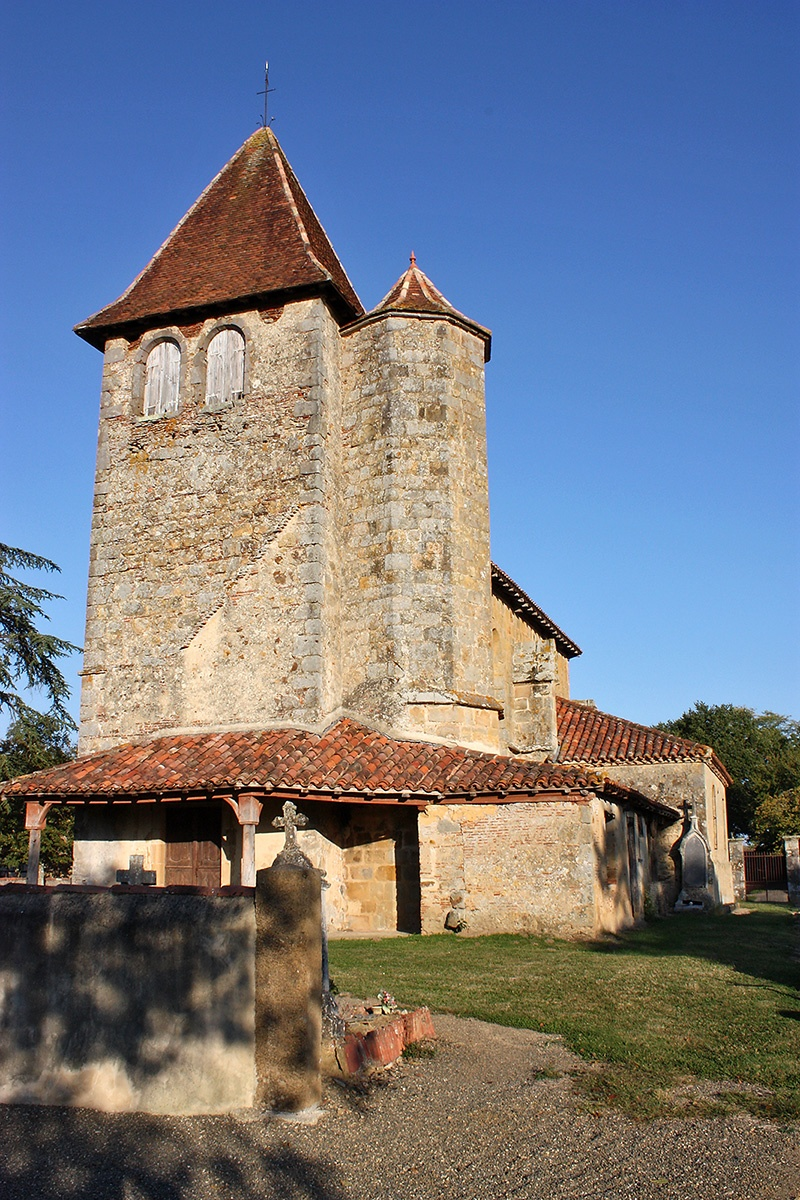
- The church in Arblade-le-Haut
- Location of Arblade-le-Haut
- Location within France Location within Occitanie
- Coordinates: 43°44′23″N 0°03′31″W
- Country: France
- Region: Occitania
- Department: Gers
- Arrondissement: Condom
- Canton: Grand-Bas-Armagnac

Government
  - Mayor (2020–2026): Jean-Marie Verrier
- Area^{1}: 12.2 km^{2} (4.7 sq mi)
- Elevation: 154 m (505 ft)
- Highest elevation: 177 m (581 ft)
- Lowest elevation: 87 m (285 ft)
- Population (2023): 308
  - Density: 25.2/km^{2} (65.4/sq mi)
- Time zone: UTC+01:00 (CET)
  - Summer (DST): UTC+02:00 (CEST)
- INSEE/Postal code: 32005 /32110
- ^{1} French Land Register data, which excludes lakes, ponds, glaciers > 1 km^{2} (0.386 sq mi or 247 acres) and river estuaries.

Arblade-le-Haut (French pronunciation: [aʁblad lə o]; Occitan: Arblada de'n Haut) is a commune in the Gers department in southwestern France.

== Geography ==
Arblade-le-Haut is located in the canton of Grand-Bas-Armagnac and in the arrondissement of Condom.

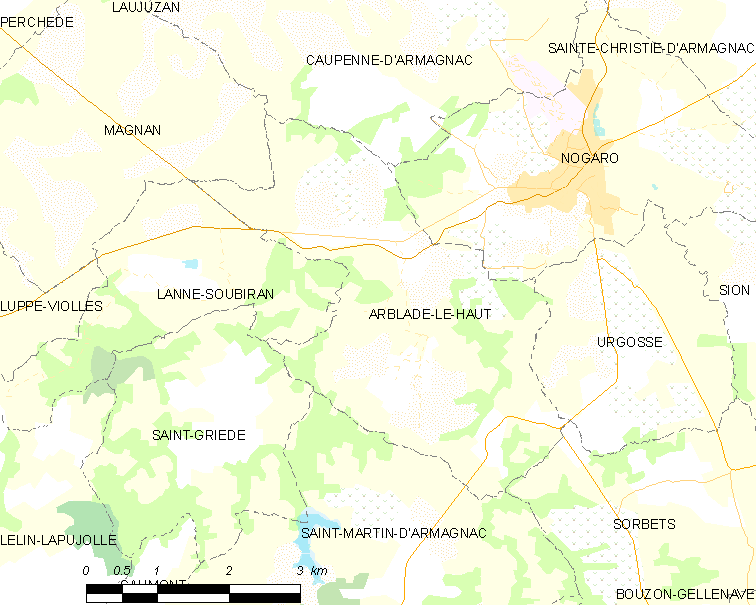
Map of Arblade-le-Haut and its surrounding communes

== Population ==
Historical population
Year	Pop.	±% p.a.
1968	246	—
1975	225	−1.27%
1982	261	+2.14%
1990	260	−0.05%
1999	276	+0.67%
2007	275	−0.05%
2012	290	+1.07%
2017	309	+1.28%
2023	308	−0.05%
Source: INSEE

== See also ==
- Communes of the Gers department
