= Toujouse =

- Commune
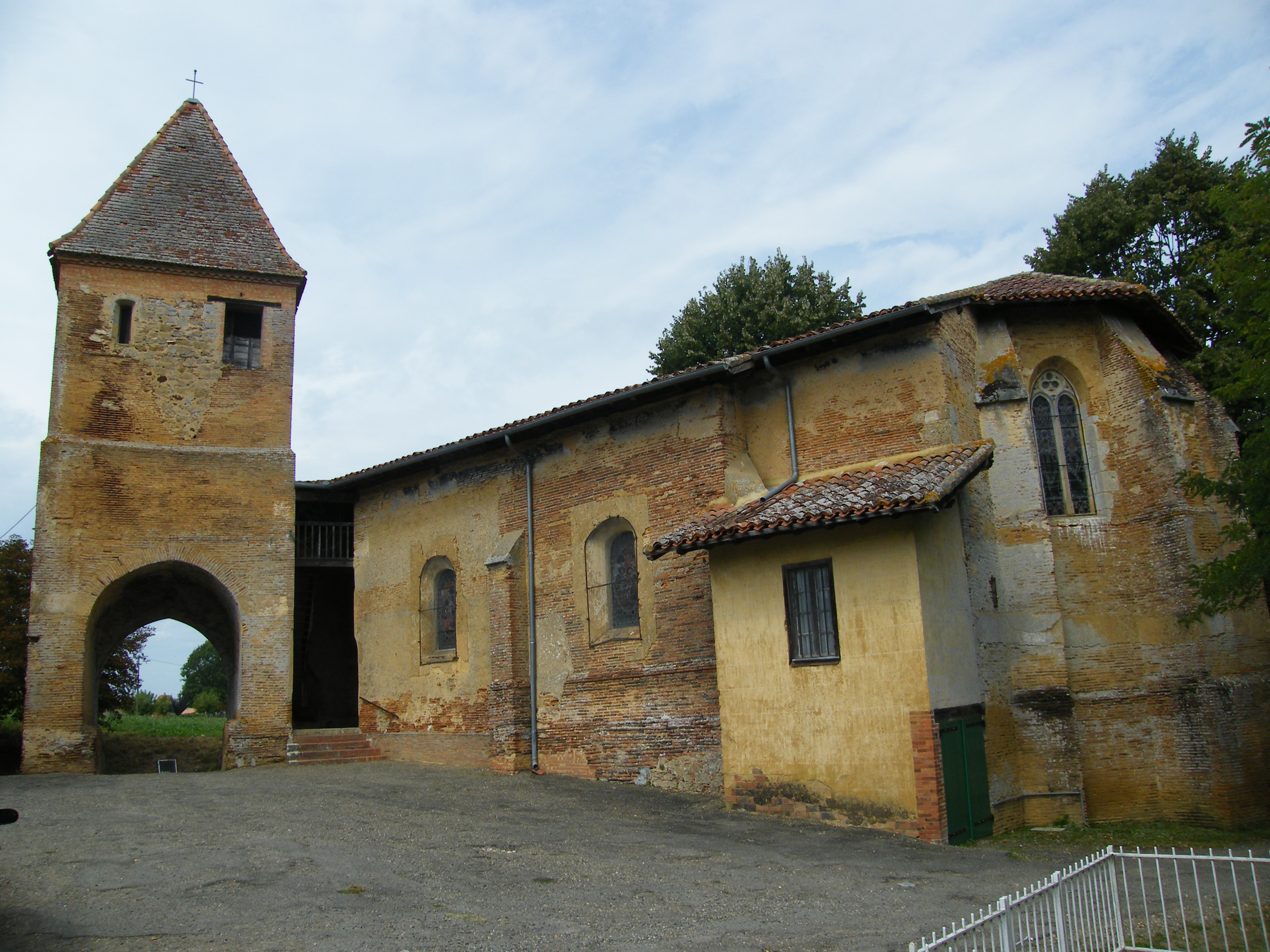
- The church in Toujouse
- Location of Toujouse
- Location within France Location within Occitanie
- Coordinates: 43°50′01″N 0°10′40″W
- Country: France
- Region: Occitania
- Department: Gers
- Arrondissement: Condom
- Canton: Grand-Bas-Armagnac
- Intercommunality: Bas-Armagnac

Government
  - Mayor (2020–2026): Jacques Tartas
- Area^{1}: 14.5 km^{2} (5.6 sq mi)
- Elevation: 115 m (377 ft)
- Highest elevation: 137 m (449 ft)
- Lowest elevation: 70 m (230 ft)
- Population (2023): 293
  - Density: 20.2/km^{2} (52.3/sq mi)
- Time zone: UTC+01:00 (CET)
  - Summer (DST): UTC+02:00 (CEST)
- INSEE/Postal code: 32449 /32240
- ^{1} French Land Register data, which excludes lakes, ponds, glaciers > 1 km^{2} (0.386 sq mi or 247 acres) and river estuaries.

Toujouse (French pronunciation: [tuʒuz]; Occitan: Tojosa) is a commune in the Gers department in southwestern France.

== Geography ==
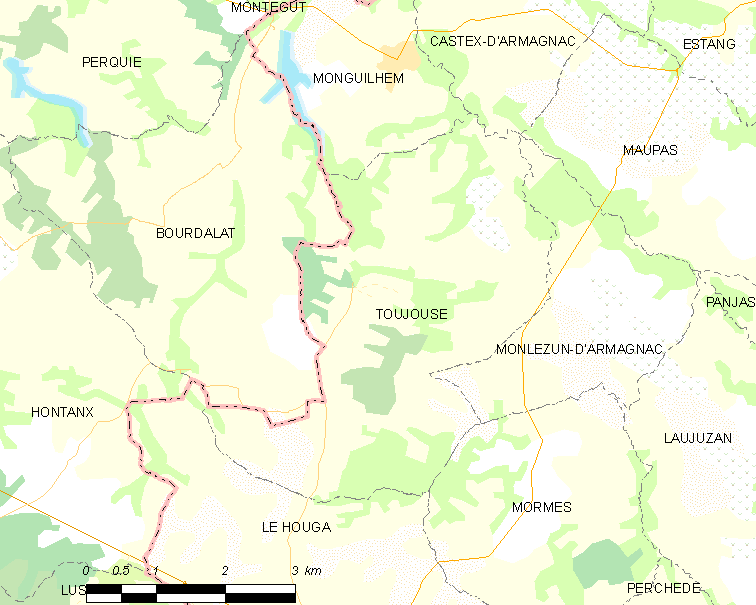
Toujouse and its surrounding communes

== Population ==
Historical population
| Year | Pop. | ±% p.a. |
|---|---|---|
| 1968 | 190 | — |
| 1975 | 152 | −3.14% |
| 1982 | 176 | +2.12% |
| 1990 | 177 | +0.07% |
| 1999 | 139 | −2.65% |
| 2007 | 199 | +4.59% |
| 2012 | 216 | +1.65% |
| 2017 | 248 | +2.80% |
| 2023 | 293 | +2.82% |
Source: INSEE

== See also ==
- Communes of the Gers department
