= Urgosse =

- Commune
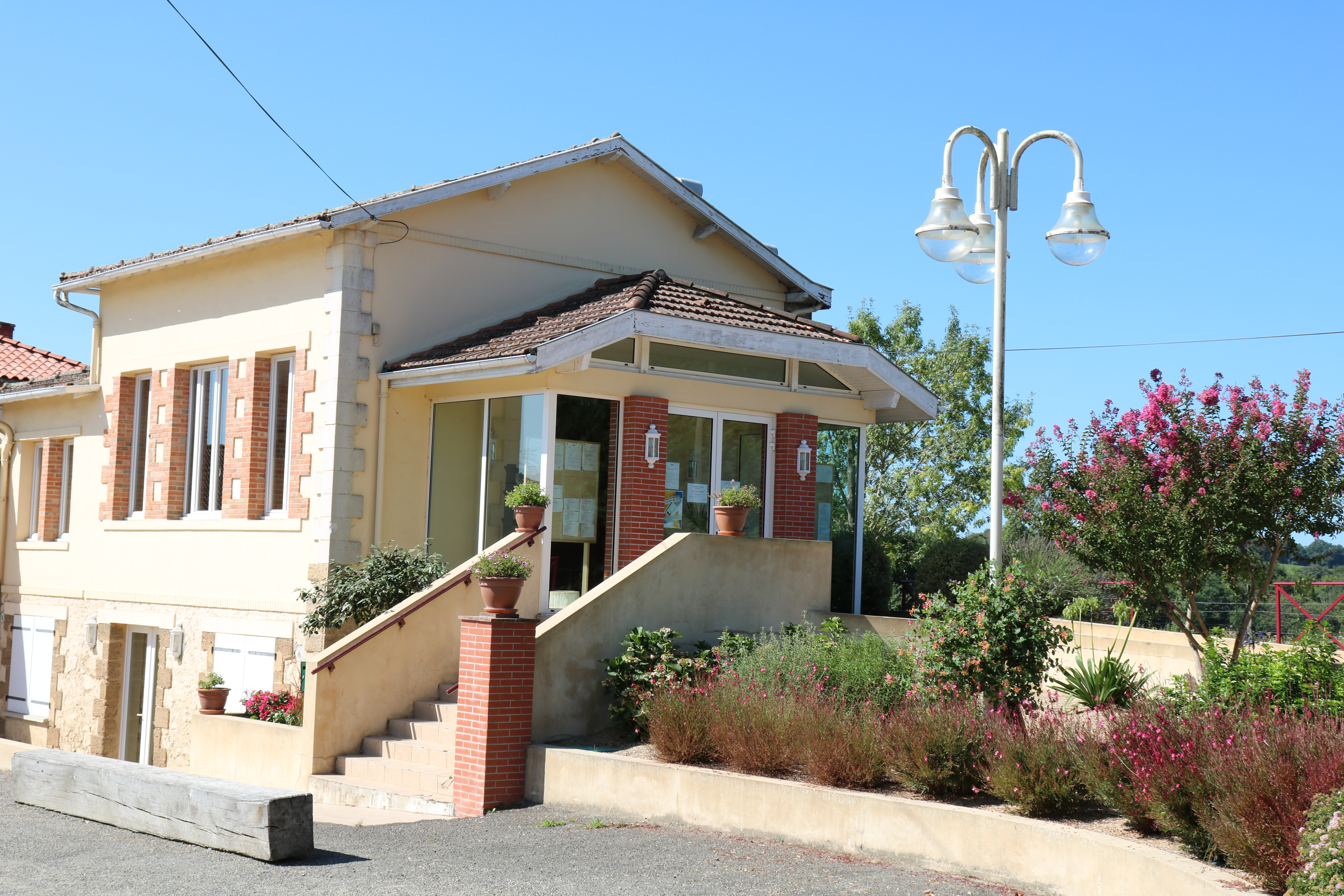
- The town hall in Urgosse
- Location of Urgosse
- Location within France Location within Occitanie
- Coordinates: 43°44′16″N 0°01′21″W
- Country: France
- Region: Occitania
- Department: Gers
- Arrondissement: Condom
- Canton: Grand-Bas-Armagnac
- Intercommunality: Bas-Armagnac

Government
  - Mayor (2020–2026): Bernard Barrail
- Area^{1}: 6.7 km^{2} (2.6 sq mi)
- Elevation: 104 m (341 ft)
- Highest elevation: 160 m (520 ft)
- Lowest elevation: 91 m (299 ft)
- Population (2023): 240
  - Density: 36/km^{2} (93/sq mi)
- Time zone: UTC+01:00 (CET)
  - Summer (DST): UTC+02:00 (CEST)
- INSEE/Postal code: 32458 /32110
- ^{1} French Land Register data, which excludes lakes, ponds, glaciers > 1 km^{2} (0.386 sq mi or 247 acres) and river estuaries.

Urgosse (French pronunciation: [yʁɡɔs]; Gascon: Urgòssa) is a commune in the Gers department in southwestern France.

== Geography ==
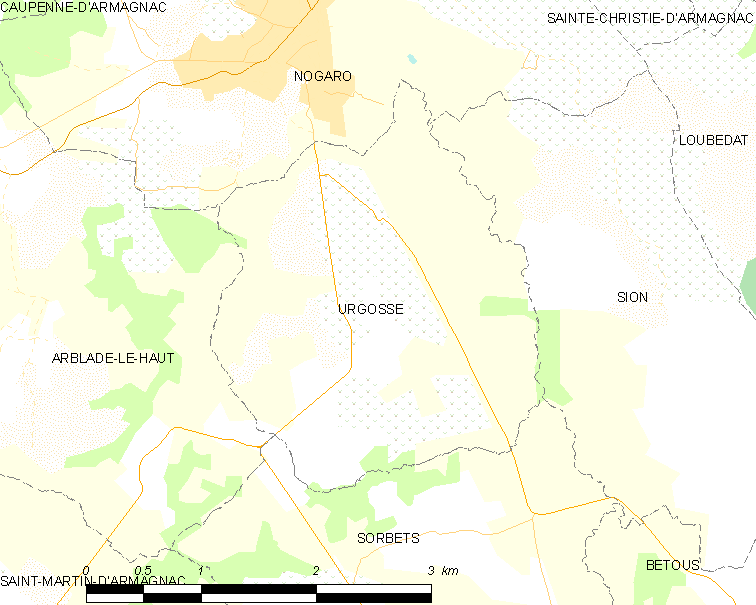
Urgosse and its surrounding communes

== Population ==
Historical population
Year	Pop.	±% p.a.
1968	267	—
1975	242	−1.39%
1982	232	−0.60%
1990	256	+1.24%
1999	231	−1.14%
2007	235	+0.21%
2012	248	+1.08%
2017	239	−0.74%
2023	240	+0.07%
Source: INSEE

== See also ==
- Communes of the Gers department
