= Canton of Grand-Bas-Armagnac =

Administrative division of Gers department, France

Coordinates: 43.76°N 0.03°W

The canton of Grand-Bas-Armagnac is an administrative division of the Gers department, southwestern France. It was created at the French canton reorganisation which came into effect in March 2015. Its seat is in Nogaro.

It consists of the following communes:

1. Arblade-le-Haut
2. Ayzieu
3. Bétous
4. Bourrouillan
5. Campagne-d'Armagnac
6. Castex-d'Armagnac
7. Caupenne-d'Armagnac
8. Cazaubon
9. Cravencères
10. Espas
11. Estang
12. Le Houga
13. Lannemaignan
14. Lanne-Soubiran
15. Larée
16. Laujuzan
17. Lias-d'Armagnac
18. Loubédat
19. Luppé-Violles
20. Magnan
21. Manciet
22. Marguestau
23. Mauléon-d'Armagnac
24. Maupas
25. Monclar
26. Monguilhem
27. Monlezun-d'Armagnac
28. Mormès
29. Nogaro
30. Panjas
31. Perchède
32. Réans
33. Sainte-Christie-d'Armagnac
34. Saint-Griède
35. Saint-Martin-d'Armagnac
36. Salles-d'Armagnac
37. Sion
38. Sorbets
39. Toujouse
40. Urgosse
