= Monlezun-d'Armagnac =

- Commune
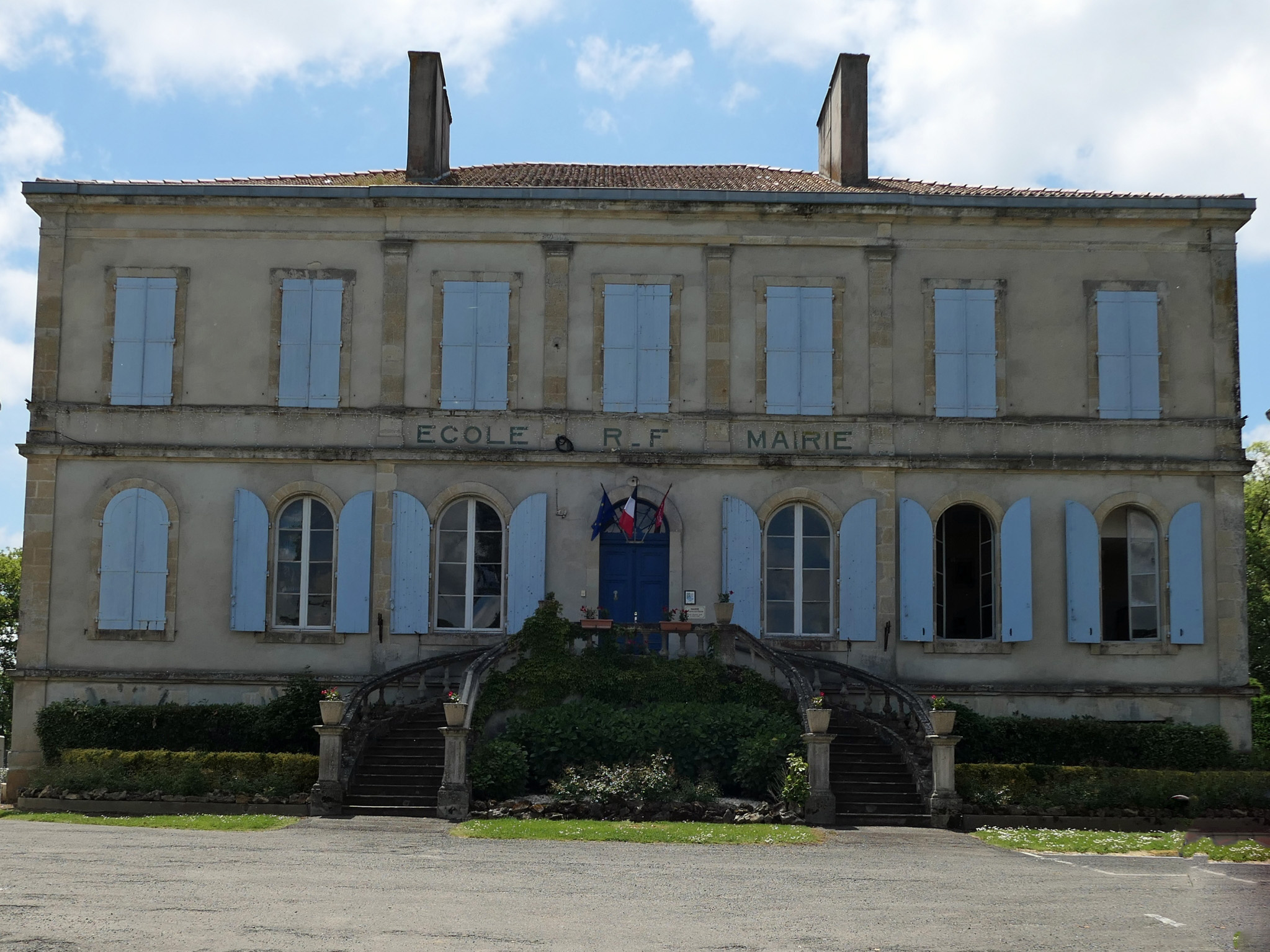
- Town hall

- Coat of arms
- Location of Monlezun-d'Armagnac
- Location within France Location within Occitanie
- Coordinates: 43°49′32″N 0°08′52″W
- Country: France
- Region: Occitania
- Department: Gers
- Arrondissement: Condom
- Canton: Grand-Bas-Armagnac
- Intercommunality: Bas-Armagnac

Government
  - Mayor (2020–2026): Philippe Sauques
- Area^{1}: 6.48 km^{2} (2.50 sq mi)
- Elevation: 120 m (390 ft)
- Highest elevation: 126 m (413 ft)
- Lowest elevation: 70 m (230 ft)
- Population (2023): 188
  - Density: 29.0/km^{2} (75.1/sq mi)
- Time zone: UTC+01:00 (CET)
  - Summer (DST): UTC+02:00 (CEST)
- INSEE/Postal code: 32274 /32240
- ^{1} French Land Register data, which excludes lakes, ponds, glaciers > 1 km^{2} (0.386 sq mi or 247 acres) and river estuaries.

Monlezun-d'Armagnac (French pronunciation: [mɔ̃ləzœ̃ daʁmaɲak], literally Monlezun of Armagnac; Gascon: Montlasun d'Armanhac) is a commune in the Gers department in southwestern France.

== Geography ==
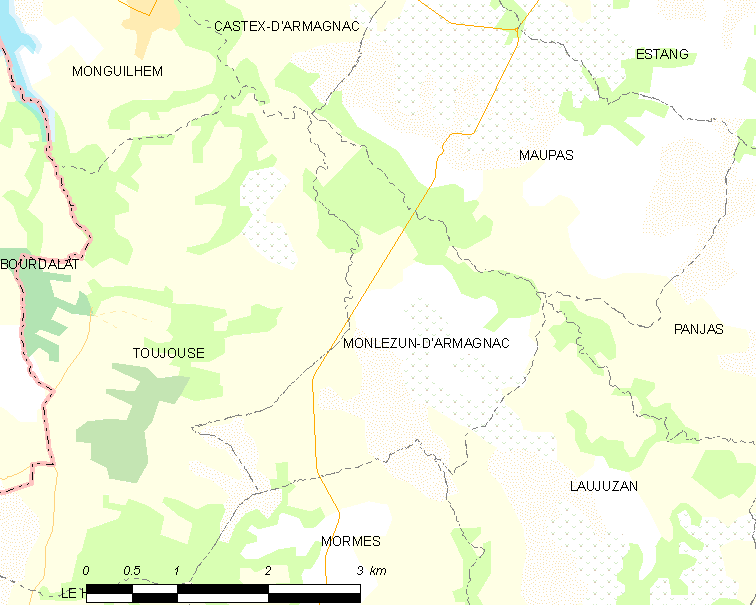
Monlezun-d'Armagnac and its surrounding communes

== Population ==
Historical population
Year	Pop.	±% p.a.
1968	263	—
1975	239	−1.36%
1982	259	+1.15%
1990	235	−1.21%
1999	205	−1.51%
2007	192	−0.82%
2012	201	+0.92%
2017	201	+0.00%
2023	188	−1.11%
Source: INSEE

== See also ==
- Communes of the Gers department
