= Bourrouillan =

- Commune
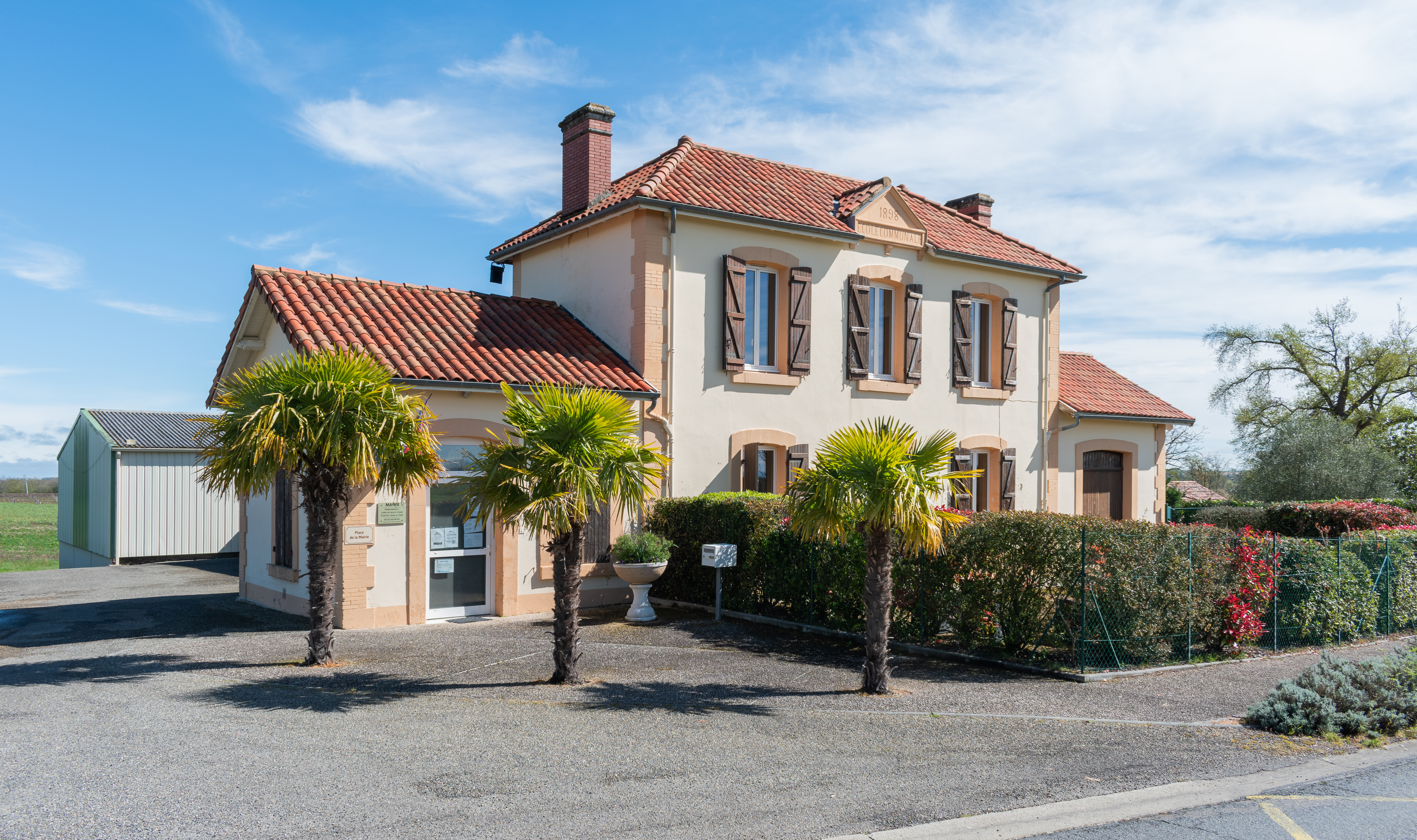
- Town hall
- Location of Bourrouillan
- Location within France Location within Occitanie
- Coordinates: 43°49′15″N 0°00′50″W
- Country: France
- Region: Occitania
- Department: Gers
- Arrondissement: Condom
- Canton: Grand-Bas-Armagnac
- Intercommunality: Bas-Armagnac

Government
  - Mayor (2020–2026): Vincent Gouanelle
- Area^{1}: 8.7 km^{2} (3.4 sq mi)
- Elevation: 160 m (520 ft)
- Highest elevation: 182 m (597 ft)
- Lowest elevation: 102 m (335 ft)
- Population (2023): 165
  - Density: 19/km^{2} (49/sq mi)
- Time zone: UTC+01:00 (CET)
  - Summer (DST): UTC+02:00 (CEST)
- INSEE/Postal code: 32062 /32370
- ^{1} French Land Register data, which excludes lakes, ponds, glaciers > 1 km^{2} (0.386 sq mi or 247 acres) and river estuaries.

Bourrouillan (French pronunciation: [buʁujɑ̃]; Occitan: Borrolhan) is a commune in the Gers department in southwestern France.

== Geography ==
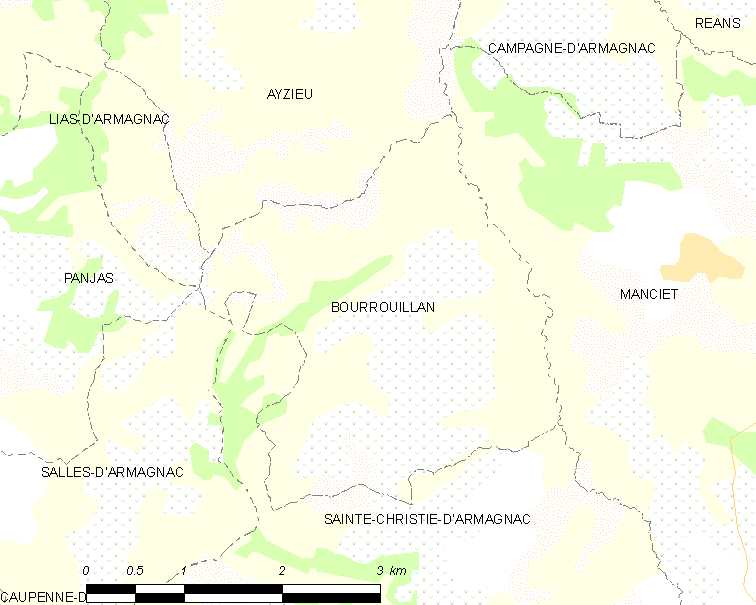
Bourrouillan and its surrounding communes

== Population ==
Historical population
Year	Pop.	±% p.a.
1968	175	—
1975	169	−0.50%
1982	174	+0.42%
1990	167	−0.51%
1999	174	+0.46%
2007	153	−1.59%
2012	148	−0.66%
2017	157	+1.19%
2023	165	+0.83%
Source: INSEE

== See also ==
- Communes of the Gers department
