= Bétous =

- Commune
- Location of Bétous
- Location within France Location within Occitanie
- Coordinates: 43°43′04″N 0°01′36″E
- Country: France
- Region: Occitania
- Department: Gers
- Arrondissement: Condom
- Canton: Grand-Bas-Armagnac

Government
  - Mayor (2020–2026): Jean-Marie Mengelle
- Area^{1}: 5.13 km^{2} (1.98 sq mi)
- Elevation: 137 m (449 ft)
- Highest elevation: 187 m (614 ft)
- Lowest elevation: 99 m (325 ft)
- Population (2023): 78
  - Density: 15/km^{2} (39/sq mi)
- Time zone: UTC+01:00 (CET)
  - Summer (DST): UTC+02:00 (CEST)
- INSEE/Postal code: 32049 /32110
- ^{1} French Land Register data, which excludes lakes, ponds, glaciers > 1 km^{2} (0.386 sq mi or 247 acres) and river estuaries.

Bétous is a commune in the Gers department in southwestern France.

== Geography ==
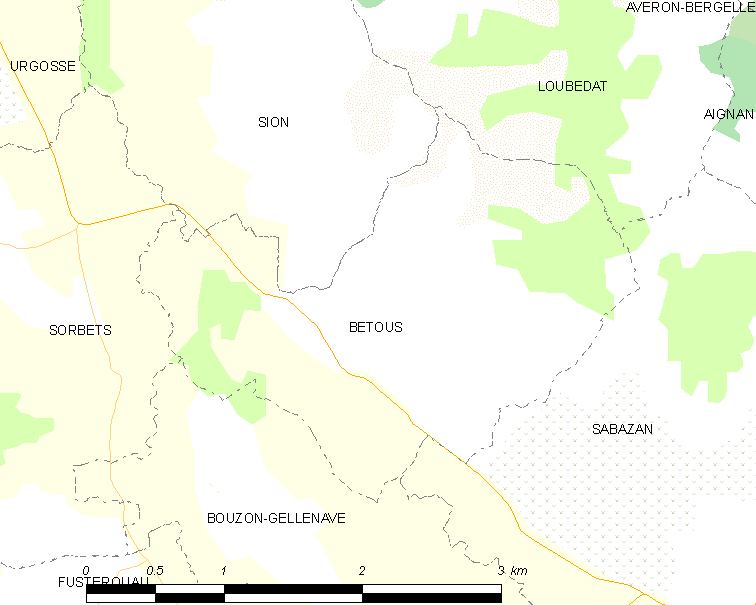
Bétous and its surrounding communes

== Population ==
Historical population
Year	Pop.	±% p.a.
1968	94	—
1975	52	−8.11%
1982	53	+0.27%
1990	55	+0.46%
1999	74	+3.35%
2007	88	+2.19%
2012	97	+1.97%
2017	88	−1.93%
2023	78	−1.99%
Source: INSEE

== See also ==
- Communes of the Gers department
