= Mormès =

- Commune
- Location of Mormès
- Location within France Location within Occitanie
- Coordinates: 43°47′54″N 0°09′11″W
- Country: France
- Region: Occitania
- Department: Gers
- Arrondissement: Condom
- Canton: Grand-Bas-Armagnac
- Intercommunality: Bas-Armagnac

Government
  - Mayor (2020–2026): Quitterie Spoerry
- Area^{1}: 9.05 km^{2} (3.49 sq mi)
- Elevation: 121 m (397 ft)
- Highest elevation: 128 m (420 ft)
- Lowest elevation: 76 m (249 ft)
- Population (2023): 107
  - Density: 11.8/km^{2} (30.6/sq mi)
- Time zone: UTC+01:00 (CET)
  - Summer (DST): UTC+02:00 (CEST)
- INSEE/Postal code: 32291 /32240
- ^{1} French Land Register data, which excludes lakes, ponds, glaciers > 1 km^{2} (0.386 sq mi or 247 acres) and river estuaries.

Mormès (French pronunciation: [mɔʁmɛs]; Gascon: Mormèrs) is a commune in the Gers department in southwestern France.

== Geography ==
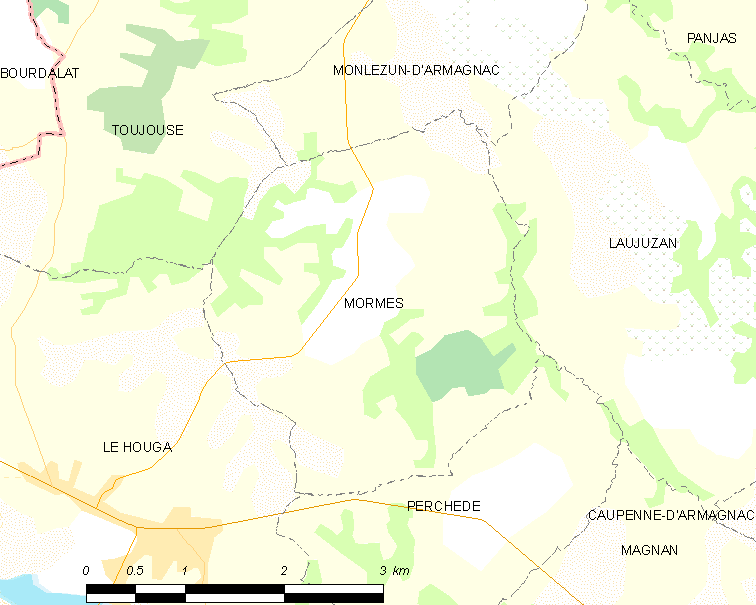
Mormès and its surrounding communes

== Population ==
Historical population
Year	Pop.	±% p.a.
1968	172	—
1975	150	−1.94%
1982	139	−1.08%
1990	133	−0.55%
1999	124	−0.78%
2007	124	+0.00%
2012	120	−0.65%
2017	121	+0.17%
2023	107	−2.03%
Source: INSEE

== See also ==
- Communes of the Gers department
