= Sainte-Christie-d'Armagnac =

- Commune
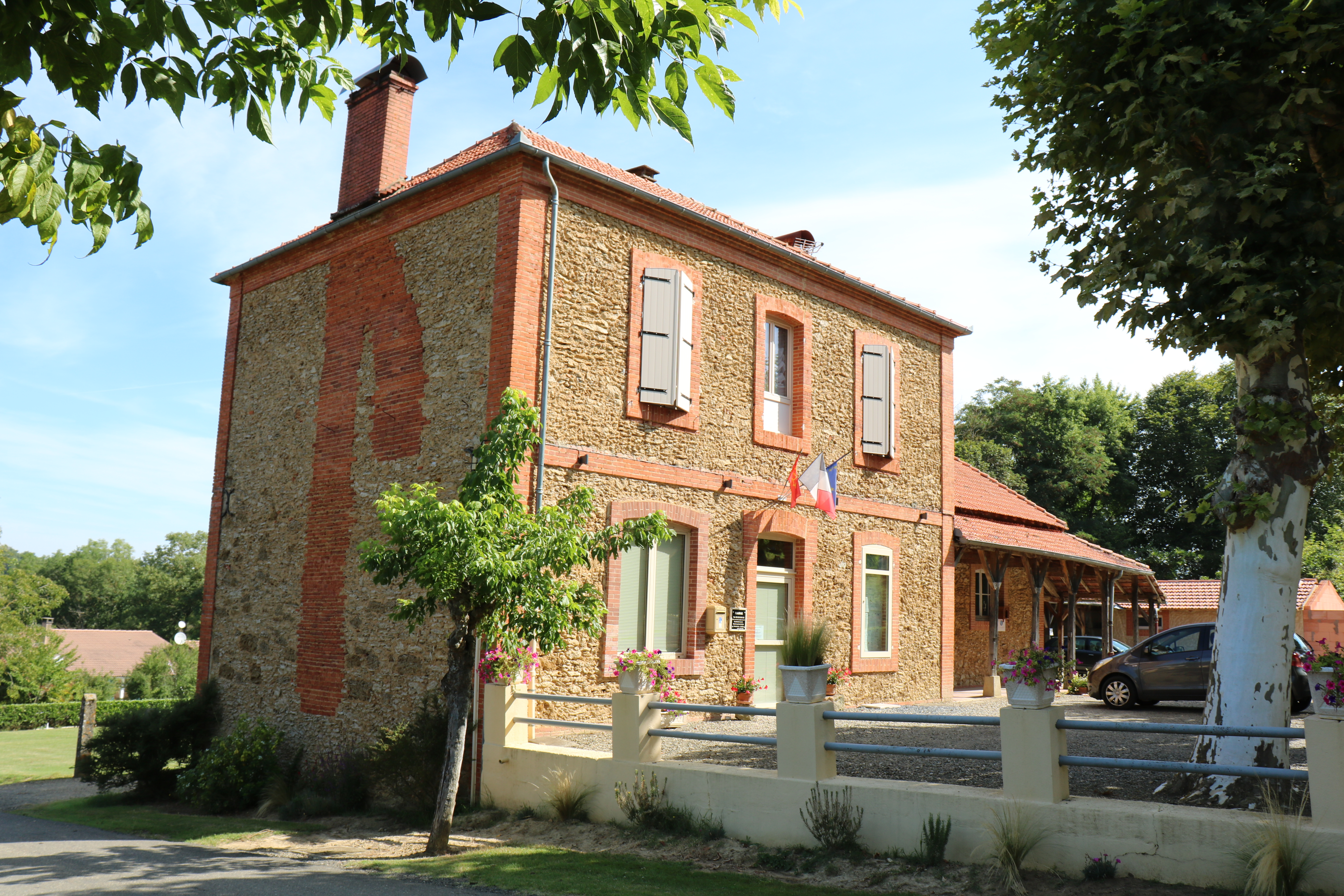
- The town hall in Sainte-Christie-d'Armagnac
- Location of Sainte-Christie-d'Armagnac
- Location within France Location within Occitanie
- Coordinates: 43°47′07″N 0°00′27″W
- Country: France
- Region: Occitania
- Department: Gers
- Arrondissement: Condom
- Canton: Grand-Bas-Armagnac

Government
  - Mayor (2020–2026): Thierry Saint-Martin
- Area^{1}: 22.5 km^{2} (8.7 sq mi)
- Highest elevation: 175 m (574 ft)
- Lowest elevation: 85 m (279 ft)
- Population (2023): 382
  - Density: 17.0/km^{2} (44.0/sq mi)
- Time zone: UTC+01:00 (CET)
  - Summer (DST): UTC+02:00 (CEST)
- INSEE/Postal code: 32369 /32370
- ^{1} French Land Register data, which excludes lakes, ponds, glaciers > 1 km^{2} (0.386 sq mi or 247 acres) and river estuaries.

Sainte-Christie-d'Armagnac (French pronunciation: [sɛ̃t kʁisti daʁmaɲak], literally Sainte-Christie of Armagnac; Occitan: Senta Crestia d'Armanhac) is a commune in the Gers department in southwestern France.

== Geography ==
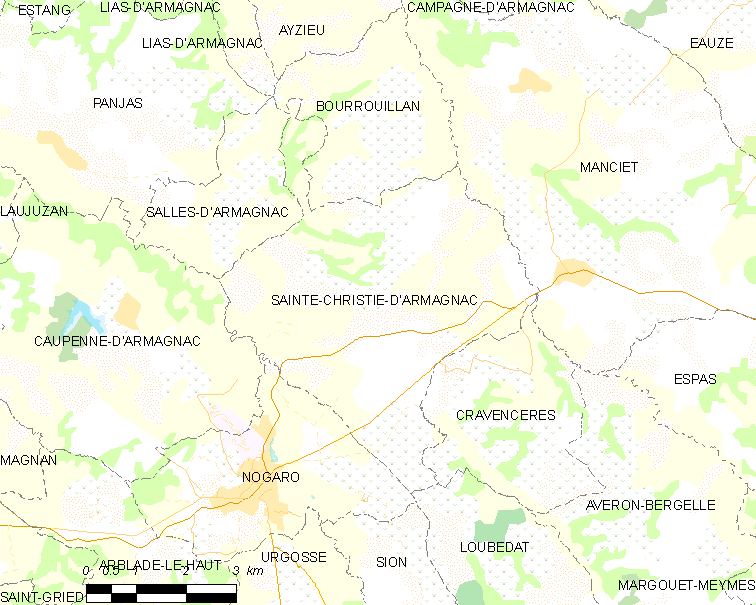
Saint-Christie-d'Armagnac and its surrounding communes

== Population ==
Historical population
| Year | Pop. | ±% p.a. |
|---|---|---|
| 1968 | 453 | — |
| 1975 | 402 | −1.69% |
| 1982 | 365 | −1.37% |
| 1990 | 360 | −0.17% |
| 1999 | 338 | −0.70% |
| 2007 | 350 | +0.44% |
| 2012 | 395 | +2.45% |
| 2017 | 373 | −1.14% |
| 2023 | 382 | +0.40% |
Source: INSEE

== See also ==
- Communes of the Gers department
