= Lannemaignan =

- Commune
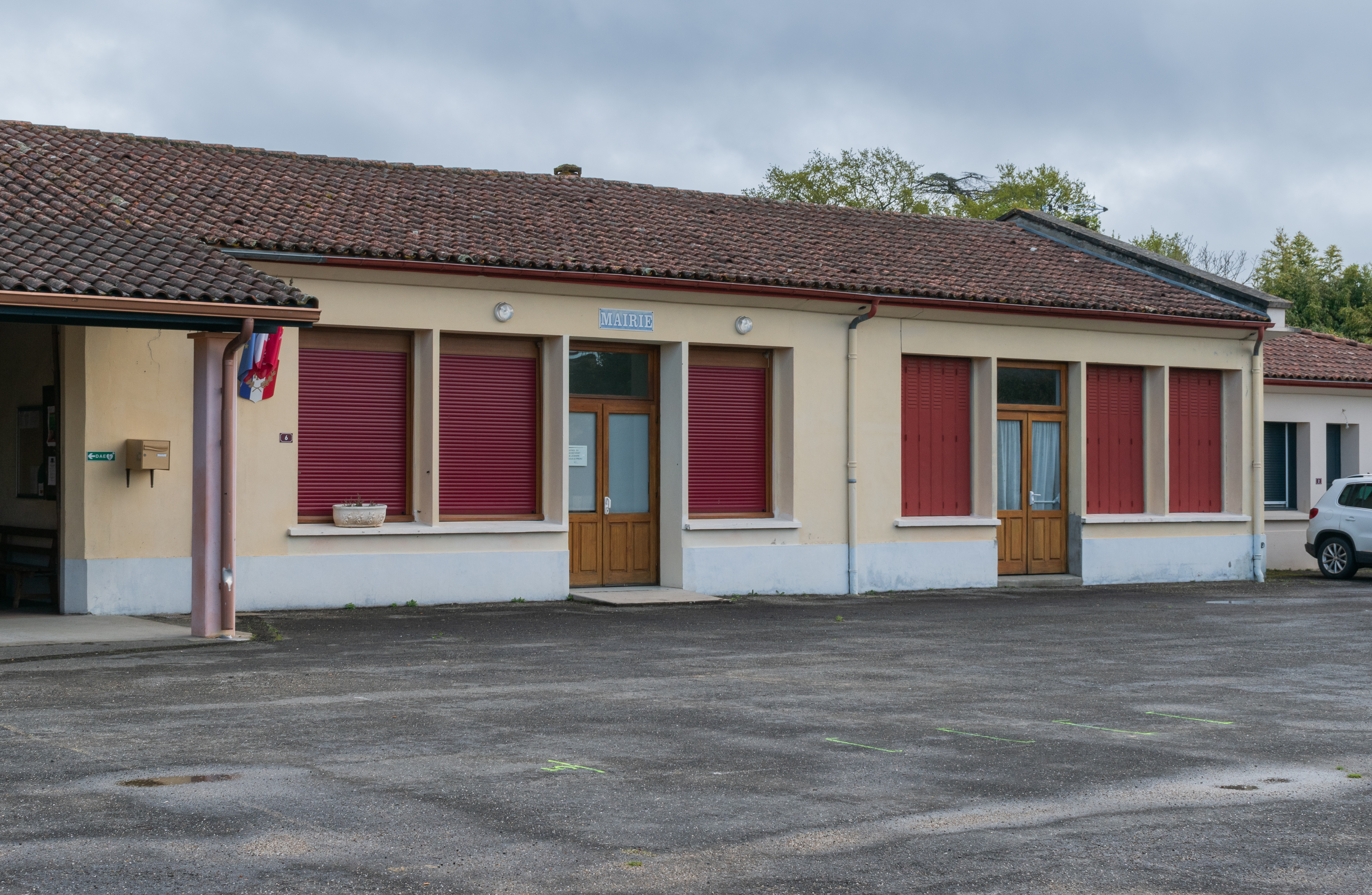
- Town hall of Lannemaignan
- Location of Lannemaignan
- Location within France Location within Occitanie
- Coordinates: 43°54′05″N 0°11′58″W
- Country: France
- Region: Occitania
- Department: Gers
- Arrondissement: Condom
- Canton: Grand-Bas-Armagnac
- Intercommunality: Grand-Armagnac

Government
  - Mayor (2020–2026): Christian David
- Area^{1}: 8.58 km^{2} (3.31 sq mi)
- Elevation: 110 m (360 ft)
- Highest elevation: 117 m (384 ft)
- Lowest elevation: 59 m (194 ft)
- Population (2023): 105
  - Density: 12.2/km^{2} (31.7/sq mi)
- Time zone: UTC+01:00 (CET)
  - Summer (DST): UTC+02:00 (CEST)
- INSEE/Postal code: 32189 /32240
- ^{1} French Land Register data, which excludes lakes, ponds, glaciers > 1 km^{2} (0.386 sq mi or 247 acres) and river estuaries.

Lannemaignan (French pronunciation: [lanmɛɲɑ̃]; Occitan: Lanamanhan) is a commune in the Gers department in southwestern France.

== Geography ==
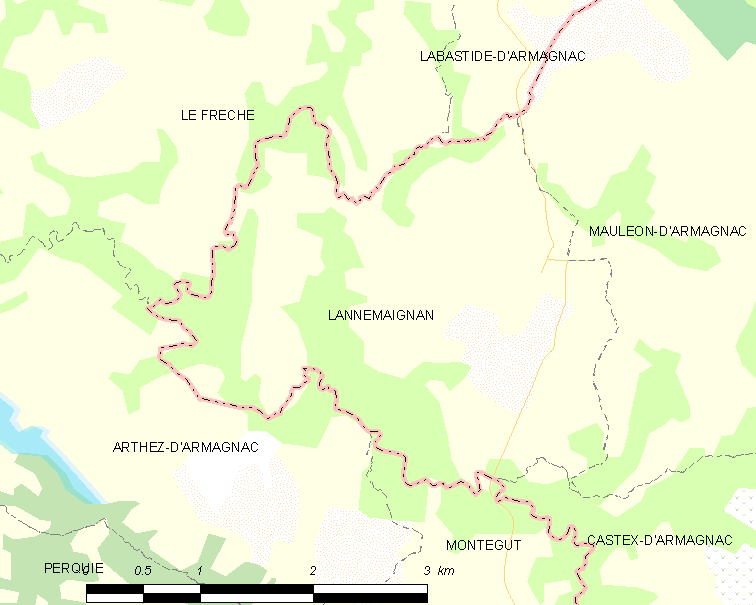
Lannemaignan and its surrounding communes

== Population ==
Historical population
Year	Pop.	±% p.a.
1968	200	—
1975	155	−3.58%
1982	132	−2.27%
1990	118	−1.39%
1999	104	−1.39%
2007	107	+0.36%
2012	105	−0.38%
2017	109	+0.75%
2023	105	−0.62%
Source: INSEE

== See also ==
- Communes of the Gers department
