= Ayzieu =

- Commune
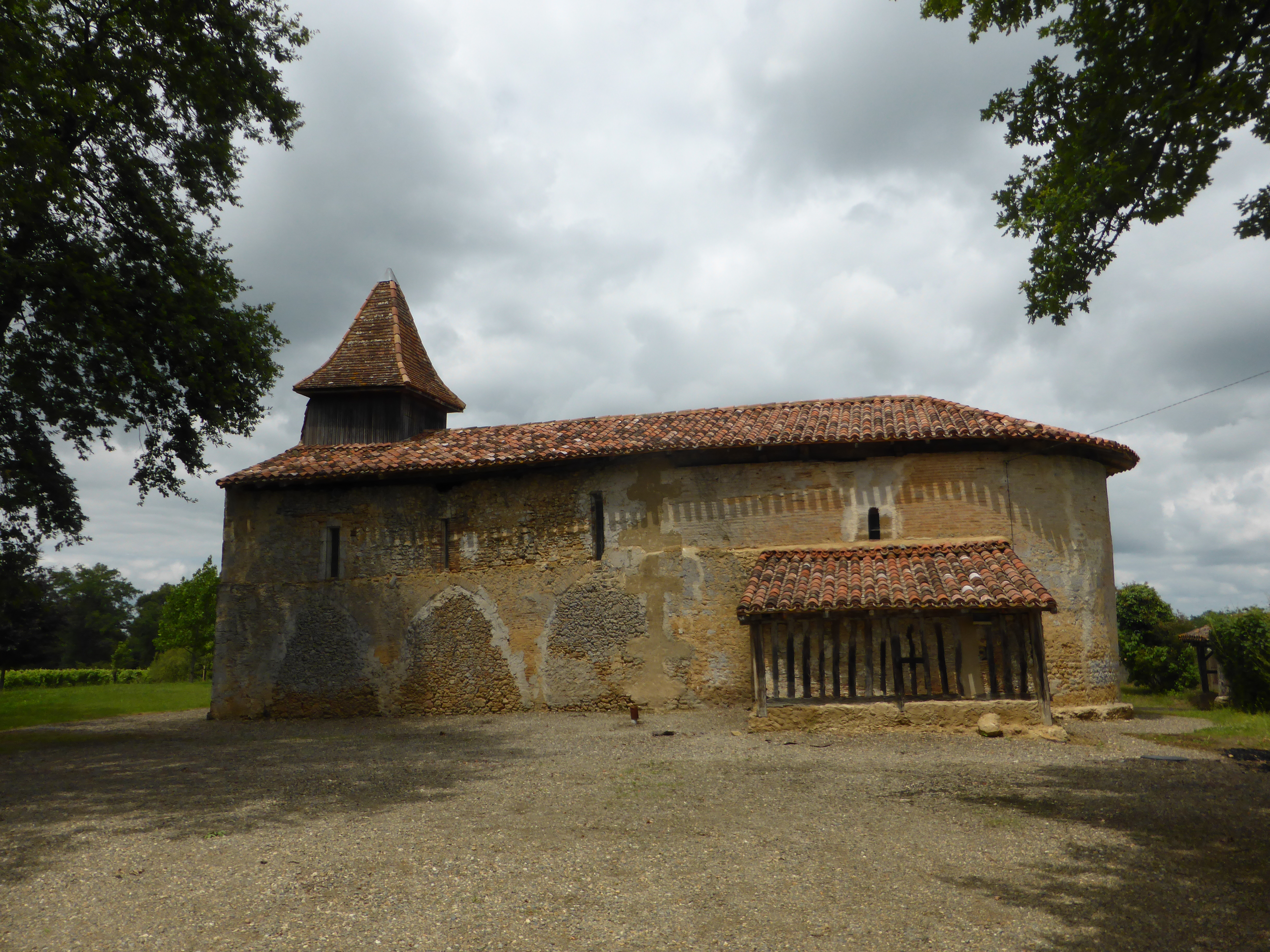
- The Pin church in Ayzieu
- Location of Ayzieu
- Location within France Location within Occitanie
- Coordinates: 43°51′02″N 0°00′57″W
- Country: France
- Region: Occitania
- Department: Gers
- Arrondissement: Condom
- Canton: Grand-Bas-Armagnac
- Intercommunality: CC Grand Armagnac

Government
  - Mayor (2020–2026): Jean-Claude Duffau
- Area^{1}: 13.84 km^{2} (5.34 sq mi)
- Elevation: 200 m (660 ft)
- Highest elevation: 175 m (574 ft)
- Lowest elevation: 102 m (335 ft)
- Population (2023): 158
  - Density: 11.4/km^{2} (29.6/sq mi)
- Time zone: UTC+01:00 (CET)
  - Summer (DST): UTC+02:00 (CEST)
- INSEE/Postal code: 32025 /32800
- ^{1} French Land Register data, which excludes lakes, ponds, glaciers > 1 km^{2} (0.386 sq mi or 247 acres) and river estuaries.

Ayzieu (French pronunciation: [ɛzjø]; Occitan: Aisiu) is a commune in the Gers department in southwestern France.

== Geography ==
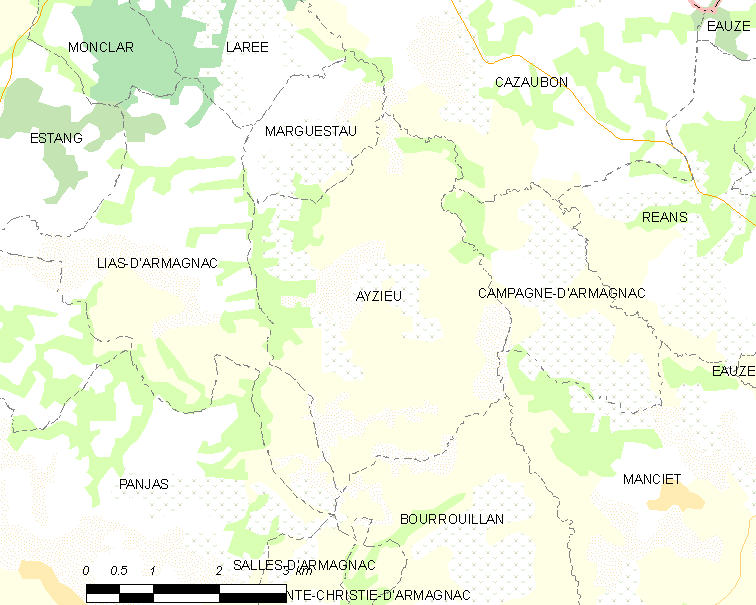
Ayzieu and its surrounding communes

== Population ==
Historical population
Year	Pop.	±% p.a.
1968	235	—
1975	207	−1.80%
1982	163	−3.36%
1990	141	−1.80%
1999	147	+0.46%
2007	141	−0.52%
2012	158	+2.30%
2017	159	+0.13%
2023	158	−0.11%
Source: INSEE

== See also ==
- Communes of the Gers department
