= Réans =

- Commune
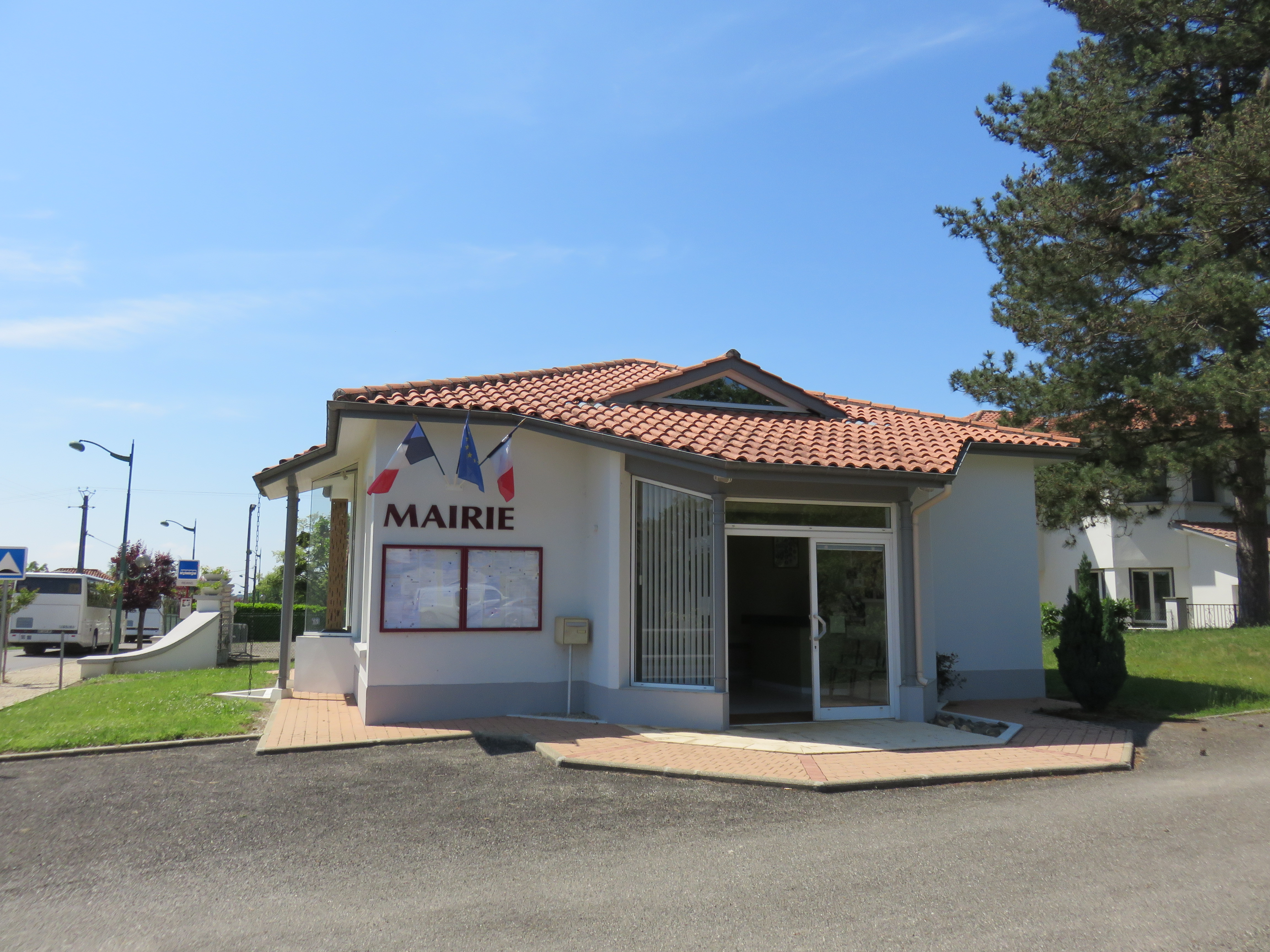
- The town hall in Réans
- Location of Réans
- Location within France Location within Occitanie
- Coordinates: 43°51′52″N 0°01′42″E
- Country: France
- Region: Occitania
- Department: Gers
- Arrondissement: Condom
- Canton: Grand-Bas-Armagnac
- Intercommunality: Grand-Armagnac

Government
  - Mayor (2020–2026): Gabrielle Clave
- Area^{1}: 12.31 km^{2} (4.75 sq mi)
- Elevation: 136 m (446 ft)
- Highest elevation: 186 m (610 ft)
- Lowest elevation: 108 m (354 ft)
- Population (2023): 297
  - Density: 24.1/km^{2} (62.5/sq mi)
- Time zone: UTC+01:00 (CET)
  - Summer (DST): UTC+02:00 (CEST)
- INSEE/Postal code: 32340 /32800
- ^{1} French Land Register data, which excludes lakes, ponds, glaciers > 1 km^{2} (0.386 sq mi or 247 acres) and river estuaries.

Réans is a commune in the Gers department in southwestern France.

== Geography ==
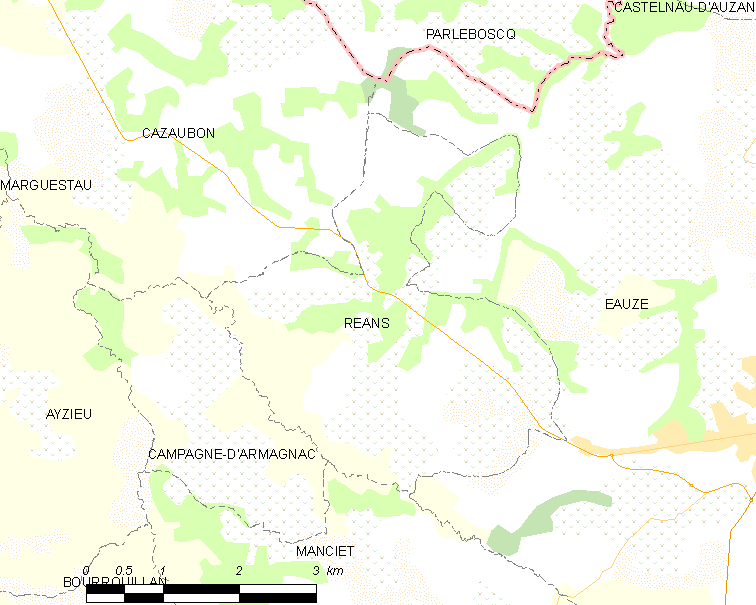
Réans and its surrounding communes

== Population ==
Historical population
Year	Pop.	±% p.a.
1968	281	—
1975	255	−1.38%
1982	282	+1.45%
1990	267	−0.68%
1999	257	−0.42%
2007	251	−0.29%
2012	240	−0.89%
2017	293	+4.07%
2023	297	+0.23%
Source: INSEE

== See also ==
- Communes of the Gers department
