= Magnan, Gers =

Magnan
- Commune
- Location of Magnan
- Location within France Location within Occitanie
- Coordinates: 43°46′11″N 0°07′18″W
- Country: France
- Region: Occitania
- Department: Gers
- Arrondissement: Condom
- Canton: Grand-Bas-Armagnac
- Intercommunality: Bas-Armagnac

Government
  - Mayor (2020–2026): Jean Duclave
- Area^{1}: 11.3 km^{2} (4.4 sq mi)
- Elevation: 128 m (420 ft)
- Highest elevation: 136 m (446 ft)
- Lowest elevation: 81 m (266 ft)
- Population (2023): 230
  - Density: 20/km^{2} (53/sq mi)
- Time zone: UTC+01:00 (CET)
  - Summer (DST): UTC+02:00 (CEST)
- INSEE/Postal code: 32222 /32110
- ^{1} French Land Register data, which excludes lakes, ponds, glaciers > 1 km^{2} (0.386 sq mi or 247 acres) and river estuaries.

Magnan (French pronunciation: [maɲɑ̃]; Occitan: Manhan) is a commune in the Gers department in southwestern France.

== Geography ==
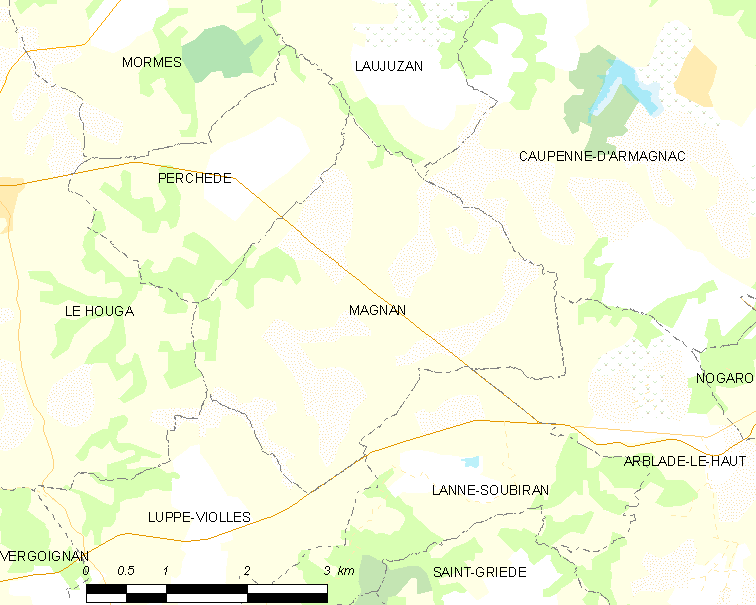
Magnan and its surrounding communes

== Population ==
Historical population
Year	Pop.	±% p.a.
1968	207	—
1975	178	−2.13%
1982	185	+0.55%
1990	205	+1.29%
1999	196	−0.50%
2007	213	+1.05%
2012	250	+3.26%
2017	239	−0.90%
2023	230	−0.64%
Source: INSEE

== See also ==
- Communes of the Gers department
