= Lanne-Soubiran =

- Commune
- Location of Lanne-Soubiran
- Location within France Location within Occitanie
- Coordinates: 43°44′54″N 0°06′43″W
- Country: France
- Region: Occitania
- Department: Gers
- Arrondissement: Condom
- Canton: Grand-Bas-Armagnac
- Intercommunality: Bas-Armagnac

Government
  - Mayor (2020–2026): Michel Pons
- Area^{1}: 6.67 km^{2} (2.58 sq mi)
- Elevation: 134 m (440 ft)
- Highest elevation: 152 m (499 ft)
- Lowest elevation: 92 m (302 ft)
- Population (2023): 141
  - Density: 21.1/km^{2} (54.8/sq mi)
- Time zone: UTC+01:00 (CET)
  - Summer (DST): UTC+02:00 (CEST)
- INSEE/Postal code: 32191 /32110
- ^{1} French Land Register data, which excludes lakes, ponds, glaciers > 1 km^{2} (0.386 sq mi or 247 acres) and river estuaries.

Lanne-Soubiran (French pronunciation: [lan subiʁɑ̃]; Occitan: Lana Sobiran) is a commune in the Gers department in southwestern France.

== Geography ==
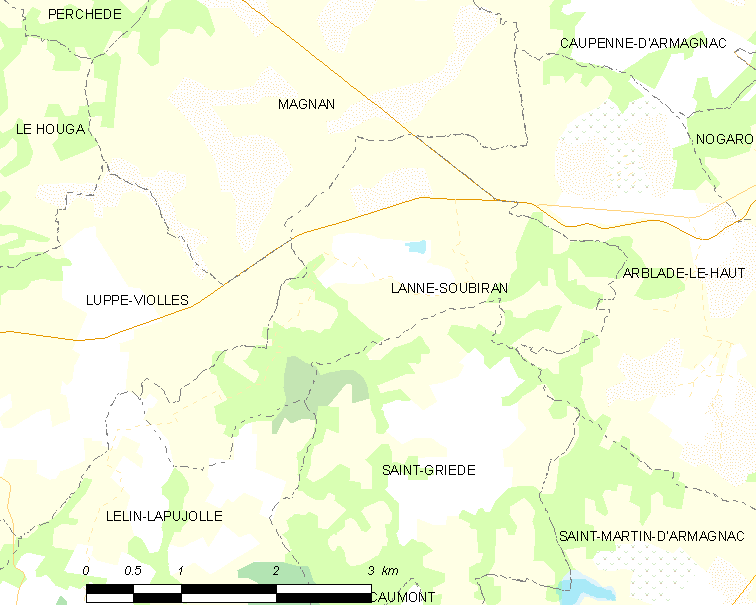
Lanne-Soubiran and its surrounding communes

== Population ==
Historical population
Year	Pop.	±% p.a.
1968	163	—
1975	101	−6.61%
1982	103	+0.28%
1990	105	+0.24%
1999	89	−1.82%
2007	106	+2.21%
2012	130	+4.17%
2017	141	+1.64%
2023	141	+0.00%
Source: INSEE

== See also ==
- Communes of the Gers department
