= Caupenne-d'Armagnac =

- Commune
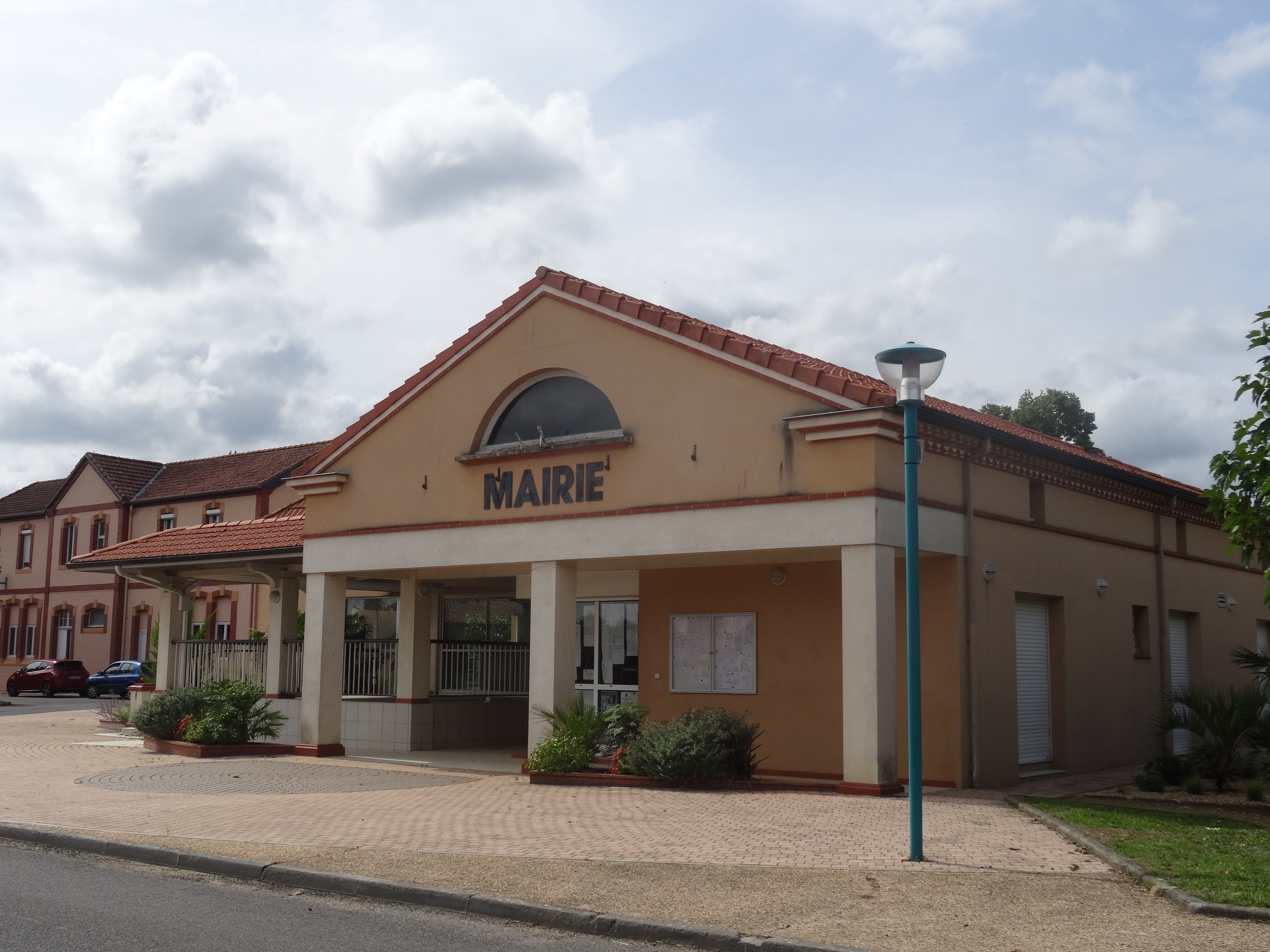
- The town hall in Caupenne-d'Armagnac

- Coat of arms
- Location of Caupenne-d'Armagnac
- Location within France Location within Occitanie
- Coordinates: 43°47′20″N 0°03′57″W
- Country: France
- Region: Occitania
- Department: Gers
- Arrondissement: Condom
- Canton: Grand-Bas-Armagnac

Government
  - Mayor (2020–2026): Patrick Guichebarou
- Area^{1}: 21.65 km^{2} (8.36 sq mi)
- Elevation: 95 m (312 ft)
- Highest elevation: 151 m (495 ft)
- Lowest elevation: 77 m (253 ft)
- Population (2023): 446
  - Density: 20.6/km^{2} (53.4/sq mi)
- Time zone: UTC+01:00 (CET)
  - Summer (DST): UTC+02:00 (CEST)
- INSEE/Postal code: 32094 /32110
- ^{1} French Land Register data, which excludes lakes, ponds, glaciers > 1 km^{2} (0.386 sq mi or 247 acres) and river estuaries.

Caupenne-d'Armagnac (French pronunciation: [kopɛn daʁmaɲak], literally Caupenne of Armagnac; Occitan: Caupena d'Armanhac) is a commune in the Gers department in southwestern metropolitan France.

== Geography ==
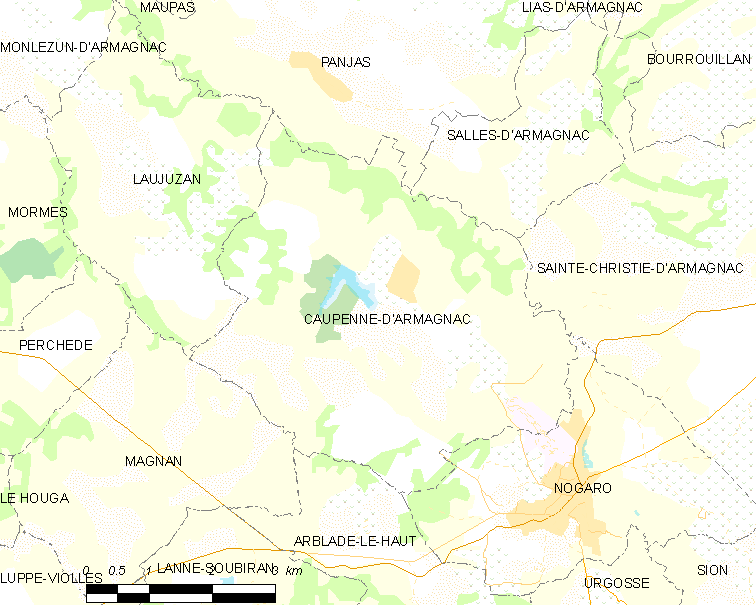
Caupenne-d'Armagnac and its surrounding communes

== Population ==
Historical population
Year	Pop.	±% p.a.
1968	404	—
1975	363	−1.52%
1982	351	−0.48%
1990	357	+0.21%
1999	377	+0.61%
2007	432	+1.72%
2012	422	−0.47%
2017	424	+0.09%
2023	446	+0.85%
Source: INSEE

== See also ==
- Communes of the Gers department
