= Salles-d'Armagnac =

- Commune
- Location of Salles-d'Armagnac
- Location within France Location within Occitanie
- Coordinates: 43°48′46″N 0°02′30″W
- Country: France
- Region: Occitania
- Department: Gers
- Arrondissement: Condom
- Canton: Grand-Bas-Armagnac
- Intercommunality: Bas-Armagnac

Government
  - Mayor (2020–2026): Benoît Hebert
- Area^{1}: 6.08 km^{2} (2.35 sq mi)
- Elevation: 130 m (430 ft)
- Highest elevation: 184 m (604 ft)
- Lowest elevation: 82 m (269 ft)
- Population (2023): 116
  - Density: 19.1/km^{2} (49.4/sq mi)
- Time zone: UTC+01:00 (CET)
  - Summer (DST): UTC+02:00 (CEST)
- INSEE/Postal code: 32408 /32370
- ^{1} French Land Register data, which excludes lakes, ponds, glaciers > 1 km^{2} (0.386 sq mi or 247 acres) and river estuaries.

Salles-d'Armagnac (French pronunciation: [sal daʁmaɲak], literally Salles of Armagnac; Occitan: Salas d'Armanhac) is a commune in the Gers department in southwestern France.

== Geography ==
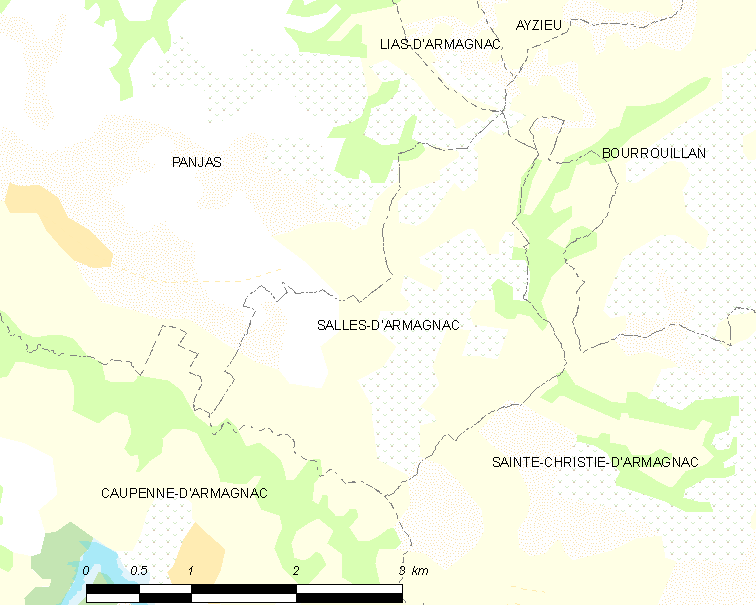
Salles-d'Armagnac and its surrounding communes

== Population ==
Historical population
Year	Pop.	±% p.a.
1968	114	—
1975	116	+0.25%
1982	101	−1.96%
1990	111	+1.19%
1999	104	−0.72%
2007	109	+0.59%
2012	119	+1.77%
2017	131	+1.94%
2023	116	−2.01%
Source: INSEE

== See also ==
- Communes of the Gers department
