= Saint-Griède =

- Commune
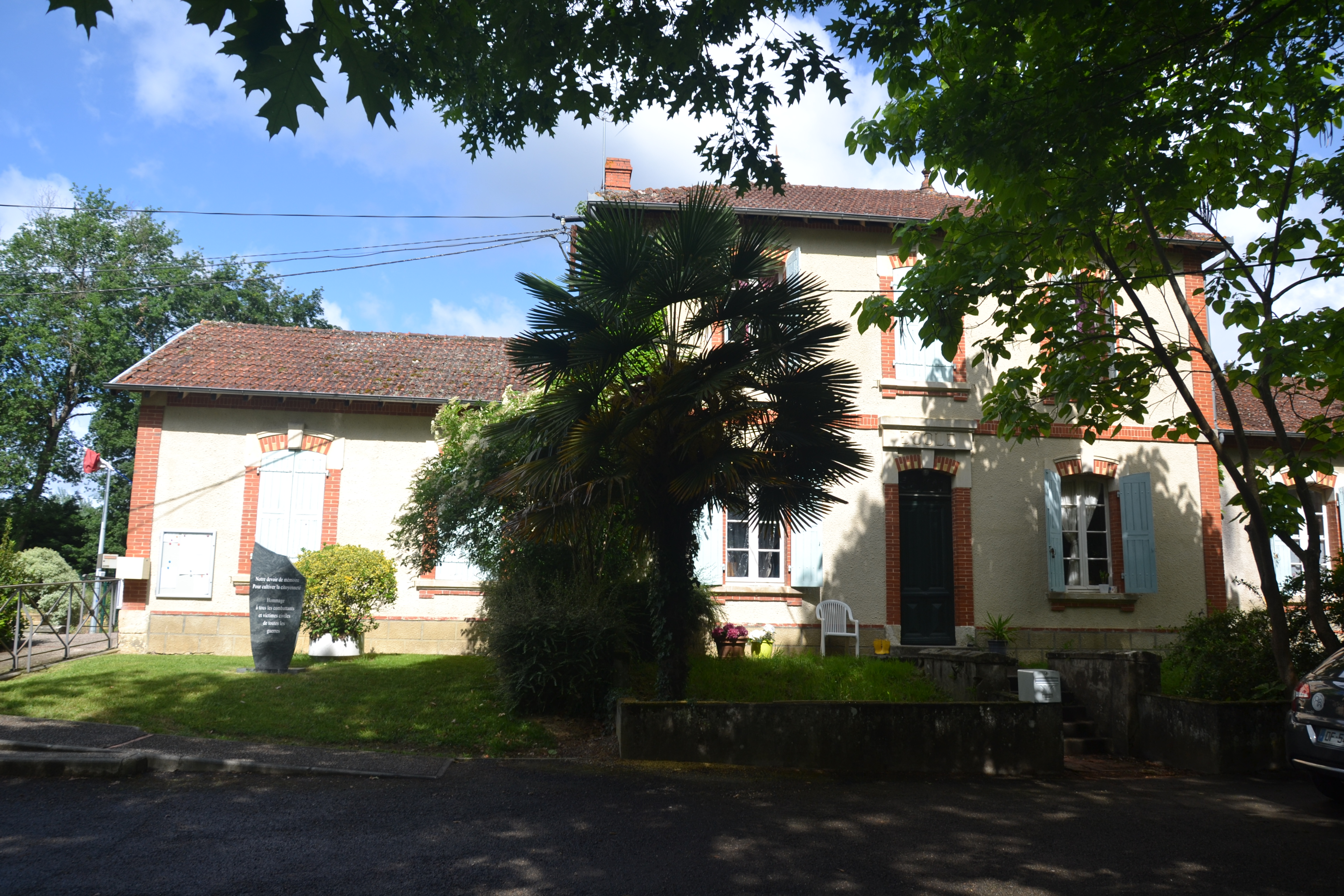
- The town hall
- Location of Saint-Griède
- Location within France Location within Occitanie
- Coordinates: 43°43′40″N 0°05′30″W
- Country: France
- Region: Occitania
- Department: Gers
- Arrondissement: Condom
- Canton: Grand-Bas-Armagnac
- Intercommunality: Bas-Armagnac

Government
  - Mayor (2020–2026): Anne-Marie Saint-Pé
- Area^{1}: 7.52 km^{2} (2.90 sq mi)
- Elevation: 137 m (449 ft)
- Highest elevation: 163 m (535 ft)
- Lowest elevation: 95 m (312 ft)
- Population (2023): 142
  - Density: 18.9/km^{2} (48.9/sq mi)
- Time zone: UTC+01:00 (CET)
  - Summer (DST): UTC+02:00 (CEST)
- INSEE/Postal code: 32380 /32110
- ^{1} French Land Register data, which excludes lakes, ponds, glaciers > 1 km^{2} (0.386 sq mi or 247 acres) and river estuaries.

Saint-Griède (French pronunciation: [sɛ̃ ɡʁijɛd]; Occitan: Sengrièda) is a commune in the Gers department in southwestern France.

== Geography ==
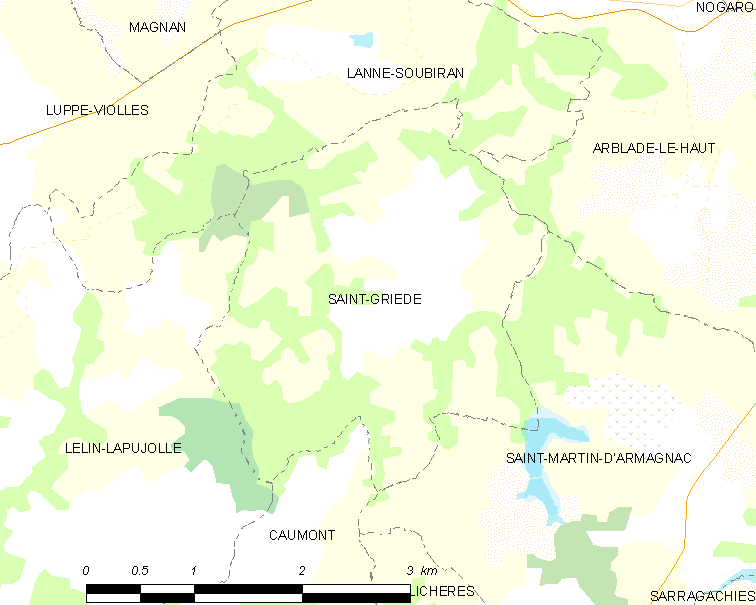
Saint-Griède and its surrounding communes

== Population ==
Historical population
Year	Pop.	±% p.a.
1968	133	—
1975	114	−2.18%
1982	119	+0.62%
1990	118	−0.11%
1999	128	+0.91%
2007	134	+0.57%
2012	137	+0.44%
2017	140	+0.43%
2023	142	+0.24%
Source: INSEE

== See also ==
- Communes of the Gers department
