= Sion, Gers =

Sion
- Commune
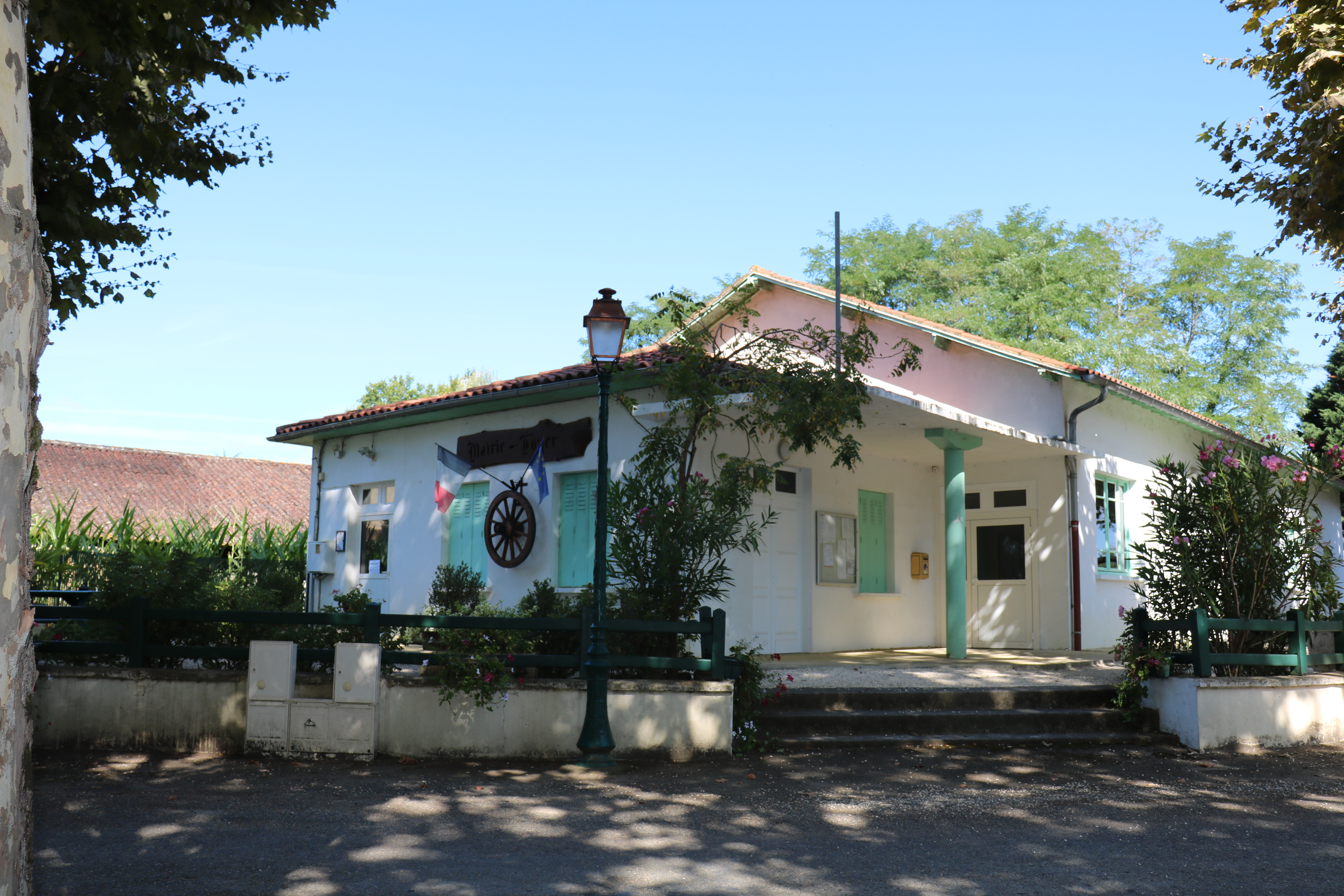
- The town hall in Sion
- Location of Sion
- Location within France Location within Occitanie
- Coordinates: 43°44′26″N 0°00′35″E
- Country: France
- Region: Occitania
- Department: Gers
- Arrondissement: Condom
- Canton: Grand-Bas-Armagnac

Government
  - Mayor (2020–2026): Élisabeth Mitterrand
- Area^{1}: 7.05 km^{2} (2.72 sq mi)
- Elevation: 140 m (460 ft)
- Highest elevation: 166 m (545 ft)
- Lowest elevation: 92 m (302 ft)
- Population (2023): 99
  - Density: 14/km^{2} (36/sq mi)
- Time zone: UTC+01:00 (CET)
  - Summer (DST): UTC+02:00 (CEST)
- INSEE/Postal code: 32434 /32110
- ^{1} French Land Register data, which excludes lakes, ponds, glaciers > 1 km^{2} (0.386 sq mi or 247 acres) and river estuaries.

Sion (French pronunciation: [sjɔ̃]) is a commune in the Gers department in southwestern France.

== Geography ==
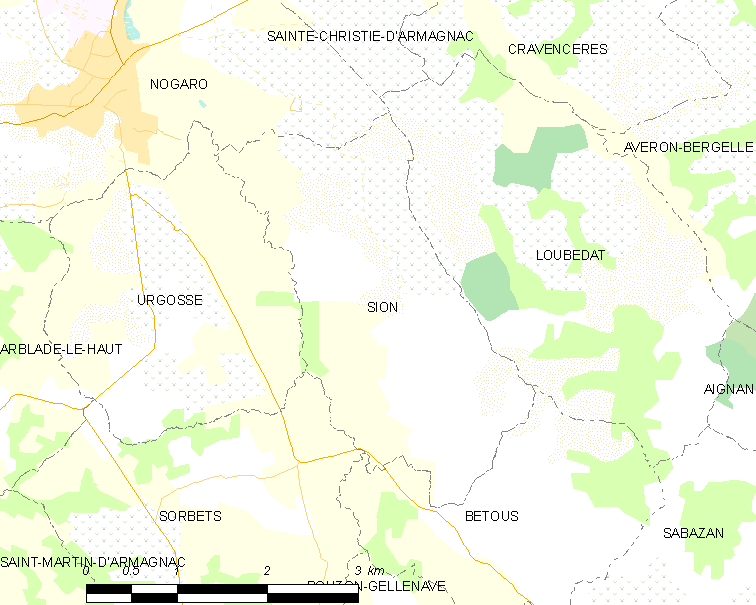
Sion and its surrounding communes

== Population ==
Historical population
Year	Pop.	±% p.a.
1968	144	—
1975	125	−2.00%
1982	118	−0.82%
1990	119	+0.11%
1999	111	−0.77%
2007	92	−2.32%
2012	121	+5.63%
2017	103	−3.17%
2023	99	−0.66%
Source: INSEE

== See also ==
- Communes of the Gers department
