= Marguestau =

- Commune
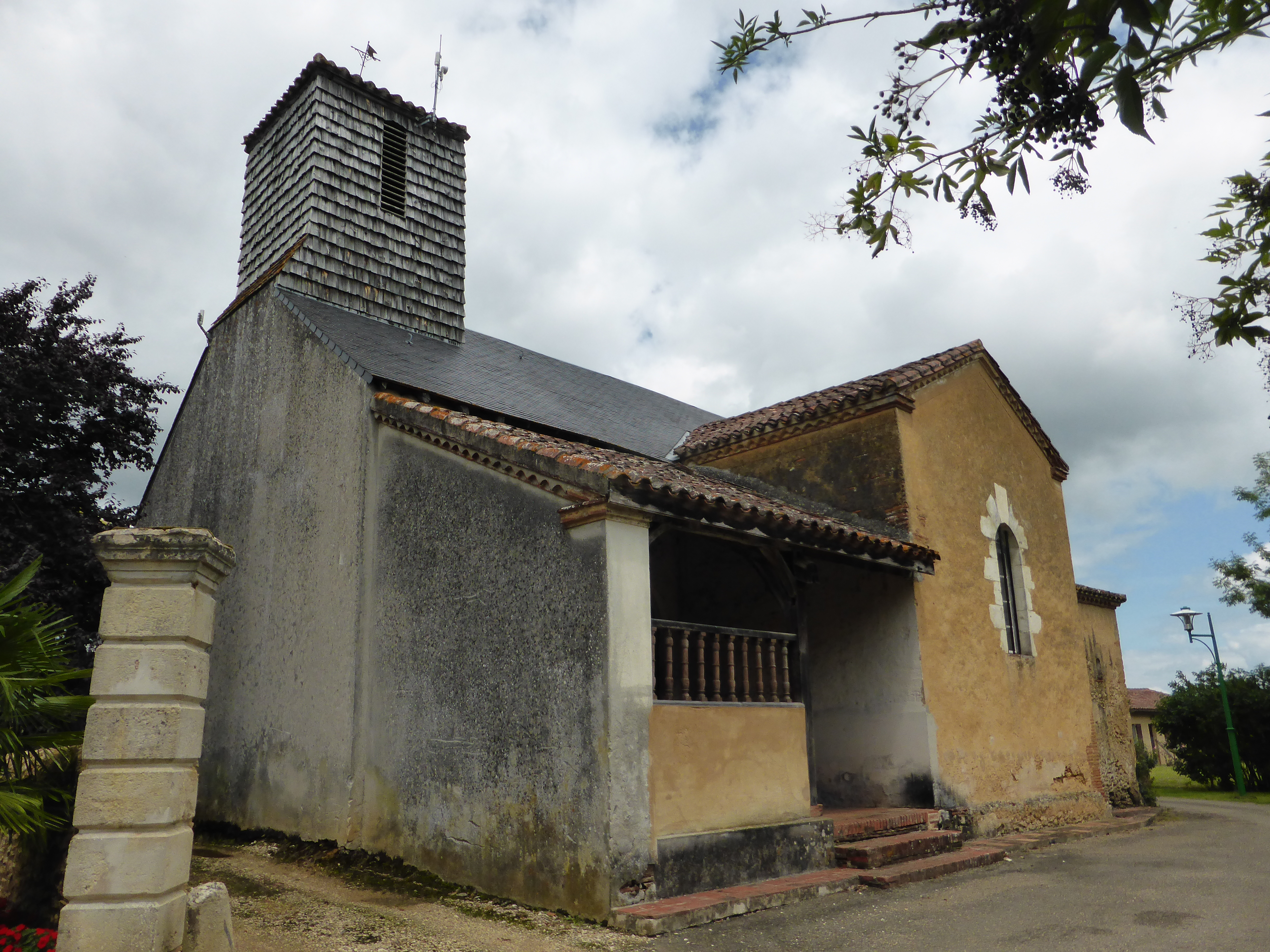
- The church in Marguestau
- Location of Marguestau
- Location within France Location within Occitanie
- Coordinates: 43°53′09″N 0°02′25″W
- Country: France
- Region: Occitania
- Department: Gers
- Arrondissement: Condom
- Canton: Grand-Bas-Armagnac
- Intercommunality: Grand-Armagnac

Government
  - Mayor (2020–2026): Anthony Ferreira
- Area^{1}: 3.21 km^{2} (1.24 sq mi)
- Elevation: 140 m (460 ft)
- Highest elevation: 148 m (486 ft)
- Lowest elevation: 101 m (331 ft)
- Population (2023): 56
  - Density: 17/km^{2} (45/sq mi)
- Time zone: UTC+01:00 (CET)
  - Summer (DST): UTC+02:00 (CEST)
- INSEE/Postal code: 32236 /32150
- ^{1} French Land Register data, which excludes lakes, ponds, glaciers > 1 km^{2} (0.386 sq mi or 247 acres) and river estuaries.

Marguestau (French pronunciation: [maʁɡɛsto]) is a commune in the Gers department in southwestern France.

== Geography ==
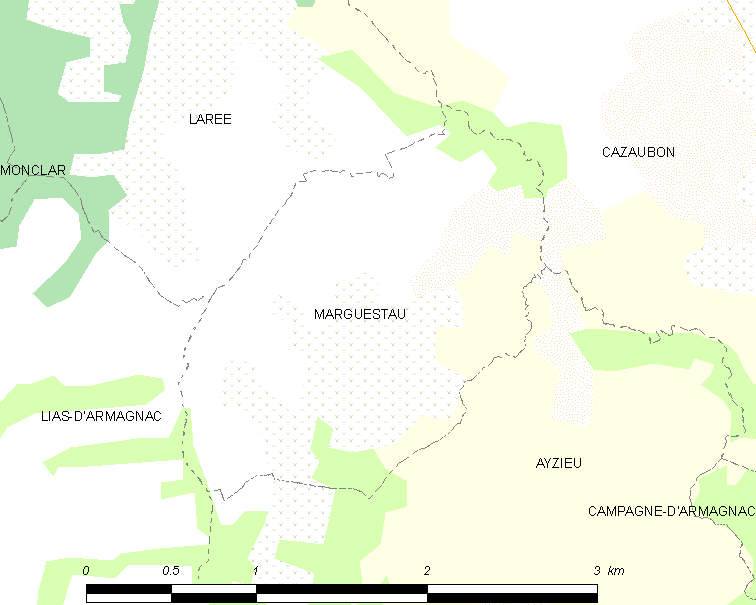
Marguestau and its surrounding communes

== Population ==
Historical population
Year	Pop.	±% p.a.
1968	77	—
1975	77	+0.00%
1982	64	−2.61%
1990	66	+0.39%
1999	59	−1.24%
2007	57	−0.43%
2012	69	+3.90%
2017	75	+1.68%
2023	56	−4.75%
Source: INSEE

== See also ==
- Communes of the Gers department
