= Sorbets, Gers =

Sorbets
- Commune
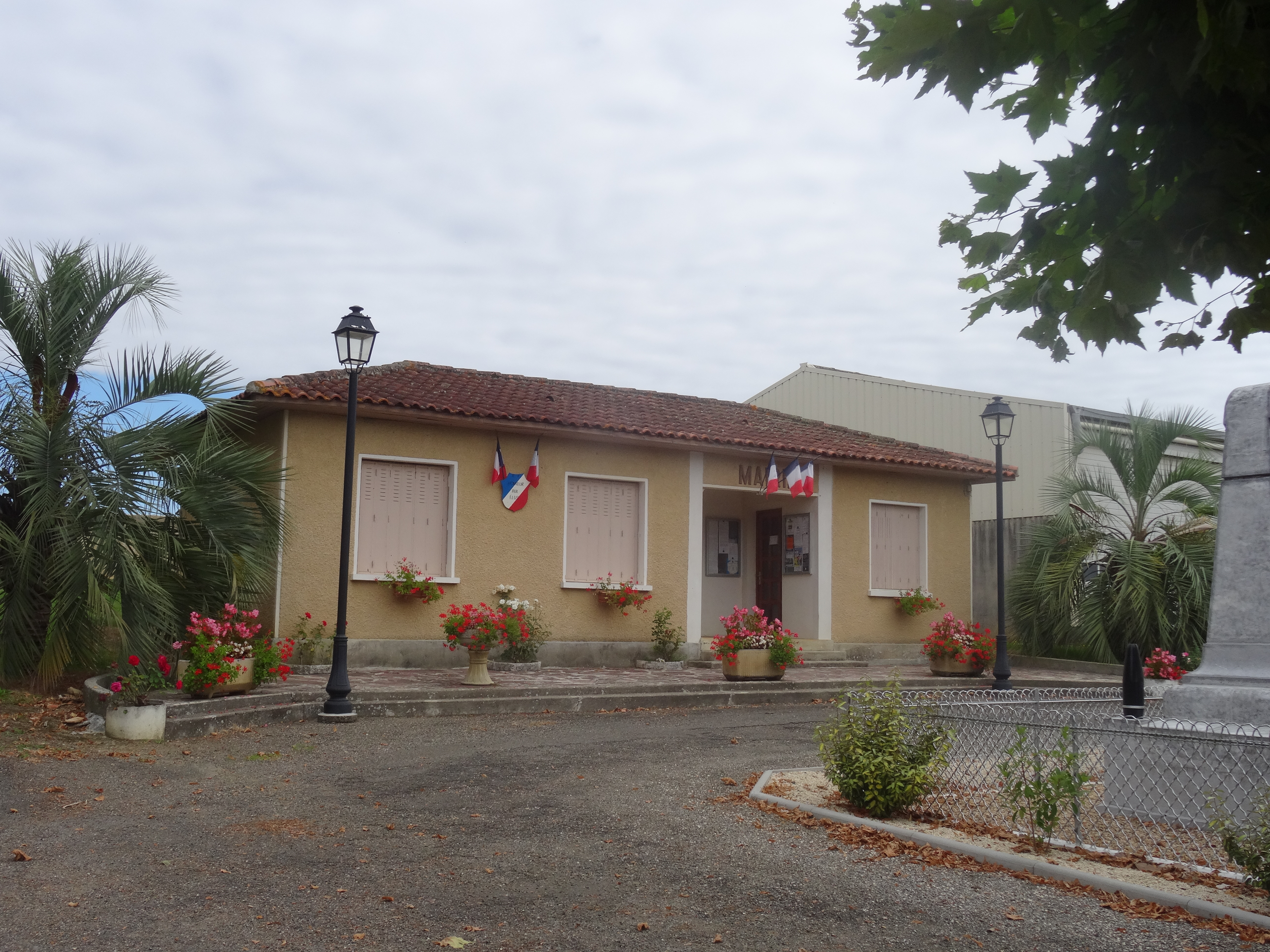
- The town hall in Sorbets
- Location of Sorbets
- Location within France Location within Occitanie
- Coordinates: 43°43′N 0°01′W
- Country: France
- Region: Occitania
- Department: Gers
- Arrondissement: Condom
- Canton: Grand-Bas-Armagnac
- Intercommunality: Bas-Armagnac

Government
  - Mayor (2020–2026): Laurent Lamothe
- Area^{1}: 9.21 km^{2} (3.56 sq mi)
- Elevation: 106 m (348 ft)
- Highest elevation: 159 m (522 ft)
- Lowest elevation: 98 m (322 ft)
- Population (2023): 203
  - Density: 22.0/km^{2} (57.1/sq mi)
- Time zone: UTC+01:00 (CET)
  - Summer (DST): UTC+02:00 (CEST)
- INSEE/Postal code: 32437 /32110
- ^{1} French Land Register data, which excludes lakes, ponds, glaciers > 1 km^{2} (0.386 sq mi or 247 acres) and river estuaries.

Sorbets is a commune in the Gers department in southwestern France.

== Geography ==
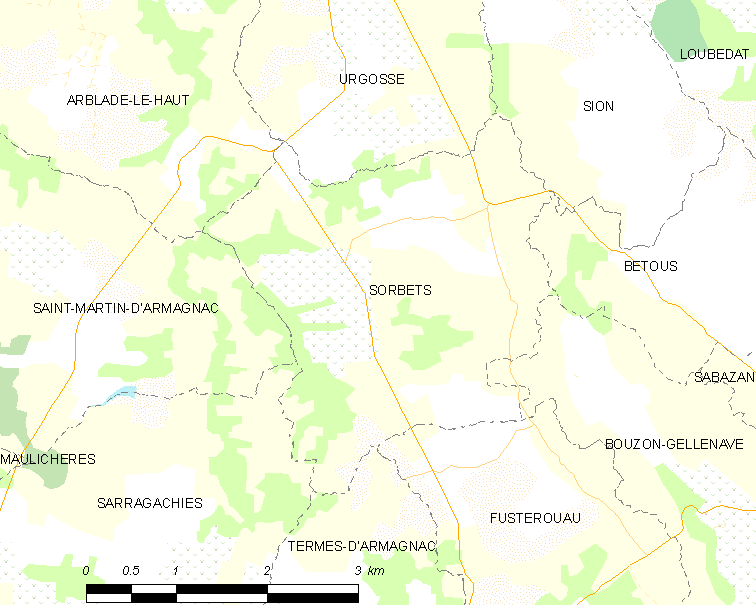
Sorbets and its surrounding communes

== Population ==
Historical population
Year	Pop.	±% p.a.
1968	224	—
1975	238	+0.87%
1982	191	−3.09%
1990	203	+0.76%
1999	194	−0.50%
2007	225	+1.87%
2012	196	−2.72%
2017	226	+2.89%
2023	203	−1.77%
Source: INSEE

== See also ==
- Communes of the Gers department
