= Sirac =

Sirac may refer to one of the following:

- Mount Sirac, a peak in the Massif des Écrins, France
- Sirac, Gers, a commune of the Gers department in France
- Sirač, a municipality in Croatia
- An alternative name for the Syrah grape
