= Giscaro =

- Commune
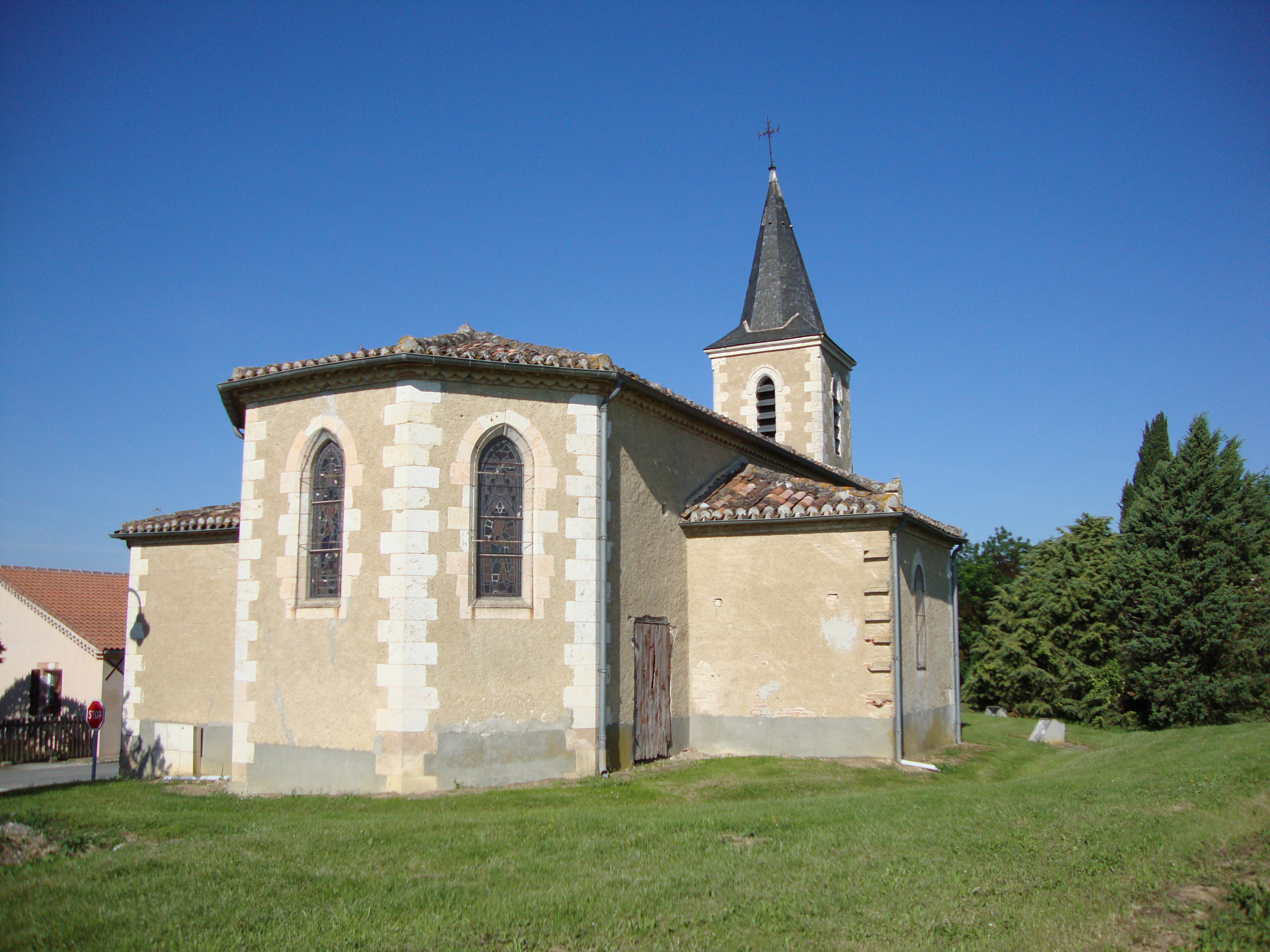
- The church in Giscaro

- Coat of arms
- Location of Giscaro
- Location within France Location within Occitanie
- Coordinates: 43°36′30″N 0°55′46″E
- Country: France
- Region: Occitania
- Department: Gers
- Arrondissement: Auch
- Canton: Gimone-Arrats

Government
  - Mayor (2020–2026): Georges de Lorenzi
- Area^{1}: 5.4 km^{2} (2.1 sq mi)
- Elevation: 200 m (660 ft)
- Highest elevation: 251 m (823 ft)
- Lowest elevation: 175 m (574 ft)
- Population (2023): 84
  - Density: 16/km^{2} (40/sq mi)
- Time zone: UTC+01:00 (CET)
  - Summer (DST): UTC+02:00 (CEST)
- INSEE/Postal code: 32148 /32200
- ^{1} French Land Register data, which excludes lakes, ponds, glaciers > 1 km^{2} (0.386 sq mi or 247 acres) and river estuaries.

Giscaro (French pronunciation: [ʒiskaʁo]; Occitan: Giscarò) is a commune in the Gers department in southwestern France.

== Geography ==
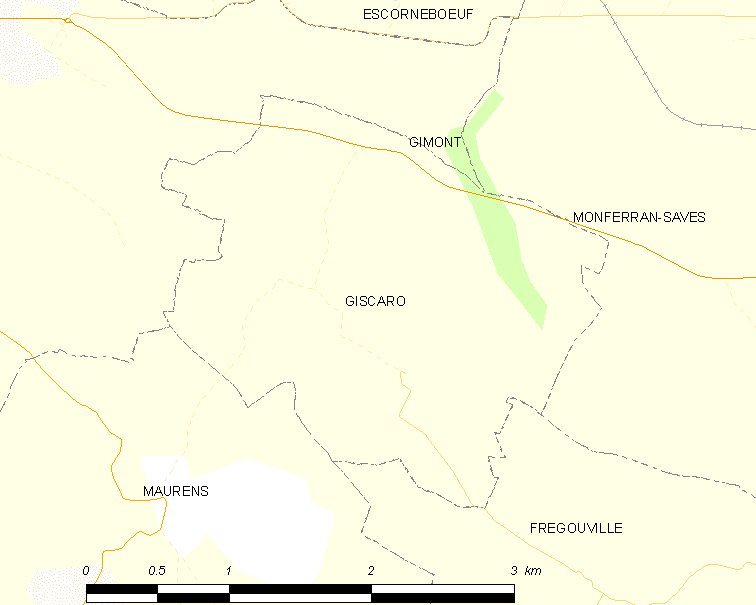
Giscaro and its surrounding communes

The commune is bordered by four other communes: Gimont to the northwest, Maurens to the southwest, Frégouville to the southeast, and finally by Monferran-Savès to the east.

== Population ==
Historical population
Year	Pop.	±% p.a.
1968	96	—
1975	100	+0.58%
1982	76	−3.84%
1990	78	+0.33%
1999	67	−1.67%
2007	73	+1.08%
2012	85	+3.09%
2017	100	+3.30%
2023	84	−2.86%
Source: INSEE

== See also ==
- Communes of the Gers department
