= Beaupuy =

Beaupuy may refer to:

== Communes in France ==
- Beaupuy, Gers
- Beaupuy, Haute-Garonne
- Beaupuy, Lot-et-Garonne
- Beaupuy, Tarn-et-Garonne

== People ==
- Jean-Marie Beaupuy (born 1943), French politician
- Michel de Beaupuy (1755–1796), French soldier
