= Monforte =

Monforte may refer to:

== Places in Italy ==
- Corleto Monforte, a comune in the province of Salerno
- Monforte d'Alba, a comune in the province of Cuneo
- Monforte San Giorgio, a comune in the province of Messina, Sicily
- A Lazio village near Casalattico, formerly called Mortale but renamed in honour of the Forte family

== Places in Portugal ==
- Castelo de Monforte (Chaves), a castle
- Monforte da Beira, a parish in Castelo Branco Municipality
- Monforte, Portugal, in Portalegre, Alto Alentejo, Alentejo

== Places in Spain ==
- Monforte de Lemos, a town or municipality in Lugo Province
- Monforte del Cid, a town in the province of Alicante, Valencian Community
- Monforte de Moyuela, a town in the province of Teruel, Aragon
- Monforte de la Sierra, a town in the province of Salamanca, Castile-León

== People ==
- Carlos Monforte (1949–2026), Brazilian journalist
- Sara Monforte (born 1980), Spanish footballer

== See also ==
- Monfort, a commune in Gers department, France
- Montfort (disambiguation)
