= Saint-Antonin, Gers =

Saint-Antonin
- Commune
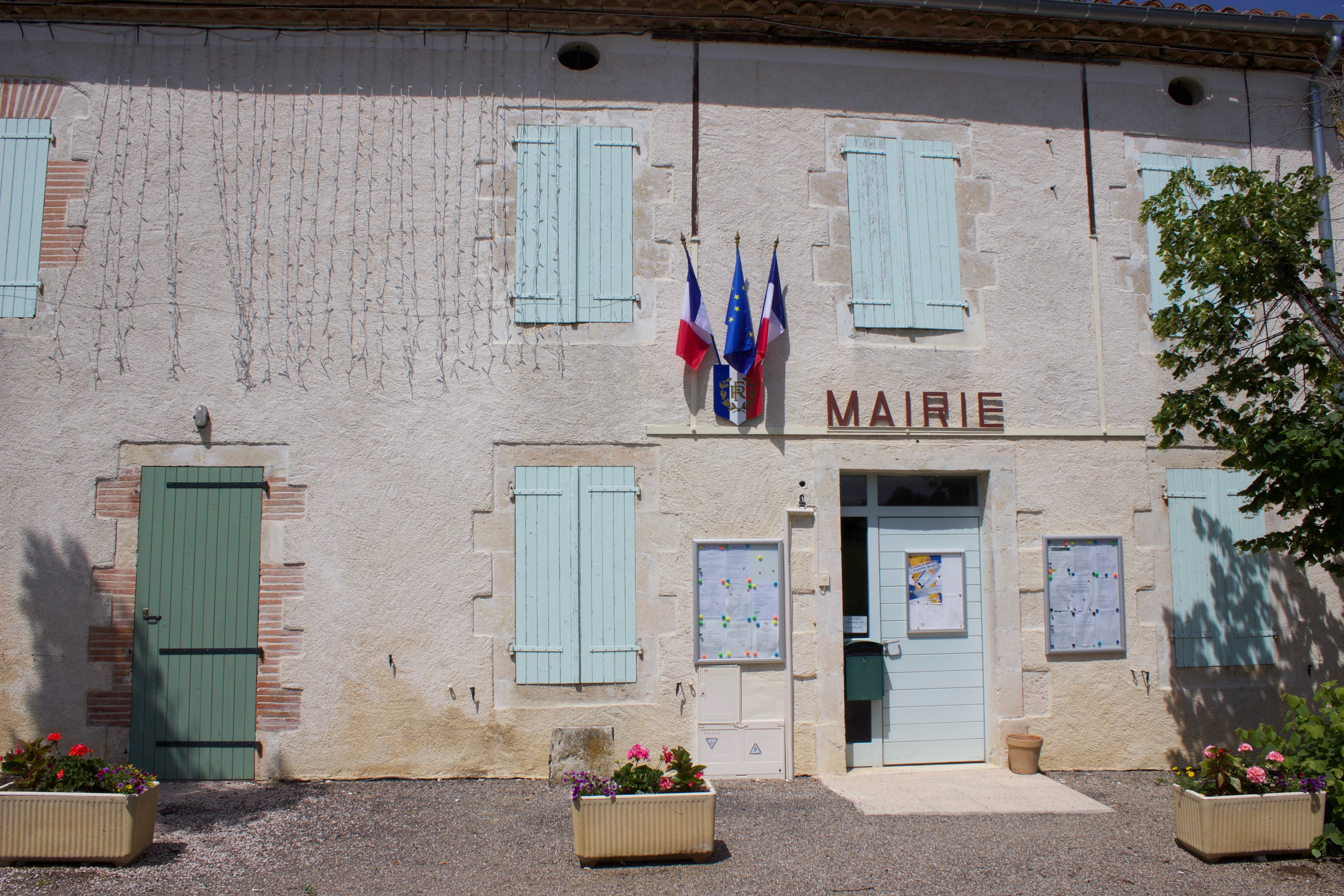
- The town hall in Saint-Antonin
- Location of Saint-Antonin
- Location within France Location within Occitanie
- Coordinates: 43°43′28″N 0°48′56″E
- Country: France
- Region: Occitania
- Department: Gers
- Arrondissement: Condom
- Canton: Gimone-Arrats

Government
  - Mayor (2020–2026): Michel Fourreau
- Area^{1}: 11.19 km^{2} (4.32 sq mi)
- Elevation: 180 m (590 ft)
- Highest elevation: 203 m (666 ft)
- Lowest elevation: 125 m (410 ft)
- Population (2023): 156
  - Density: 13.9/km^{2} (36.1/sq mi)
- Time zone: UTC+01:00 (CET)
  - Summer (DST): UTC+02:00 (CEST)
- INSEE/Postal code: 32359 /32120
- ^{1} French Land Register data, which excludes lakes, ponds, glaciers > 1 km^{2} (0.386 sq mi or 247 acres) and river estuaries.

Saint-Antonin (French pronunciation: [sɛ̃.t‿ɑ̃tɔnɛ̃]; Gascon: Sent Antonin) is a commune in the Gers department in southwestern France. It is located near Auch and Mauvezin.

== Geography ==
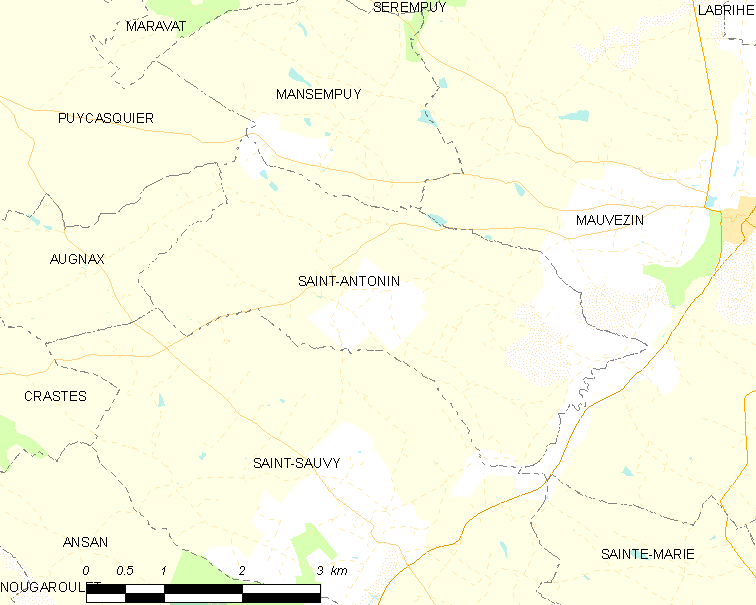
Saint-Antonin and its surrounding communes

== Population ==
Historical population
Year	Pop.	±% p.a.
1968	174	—
1975	137	−3.36%
1982	138	+0.10%
1990	118	−1.94%
1999	130	+1.08%
2007	134	+0.38%
2012	155	+2.95%
2017	159	+0.51%
2023	156	−0.32%
Source: INSEE

== See also ==
- Communes of the Gers department

== Landscape ==
It is mostly made up farms and has many fields. Some crops that are grown are corn, sunflowers, and wheat. There are some people who live yearly in the village. There are 145 people but the village is spread and could accommodate over 750 people. There is a tennis court in the middle of the village. Since the village is spread, so are the houses and farms (in the middle of this is fields for the crops). This is why the center of the village has fewer than ten buildings.
