= Maravat =

- Commune
- Location of Maravat
- Location within France Location within Occitanie
- Coordinates: 43°45′29″N 0°45′12″E
- Country: France
- Region: Occitania
- Department: Gers
- Arrondissement: Condom
- Canton: Gimone-Arrats

Government
  - Mayor (2020–2026): Florian Pinos
- Area^{1}: 6.46 km^{2} (2.49 sq mi)
- Elevation: 180 m (590 ft)
- Highest elevation: 242 m (794 ft)
- Lowest elevation: 138 m (453 ft)
- Population (2023): 50
  - Density: 7.7/km^{2} (20/sq mi)
- Time zone: UTC+01:00 (CET)
  - Summer (DST): UTC+02:00 (CEST)
- INSEE/Postal code: 32232 /32120
- ^{1} French Land Register data, which excludes lakes, ponds, glaciers > 1 km^{2} (0.386 sq mi or 247 acres) and river estuaries.

Maravat is a commune in the Gers department in southwestern France.

== Geography ==
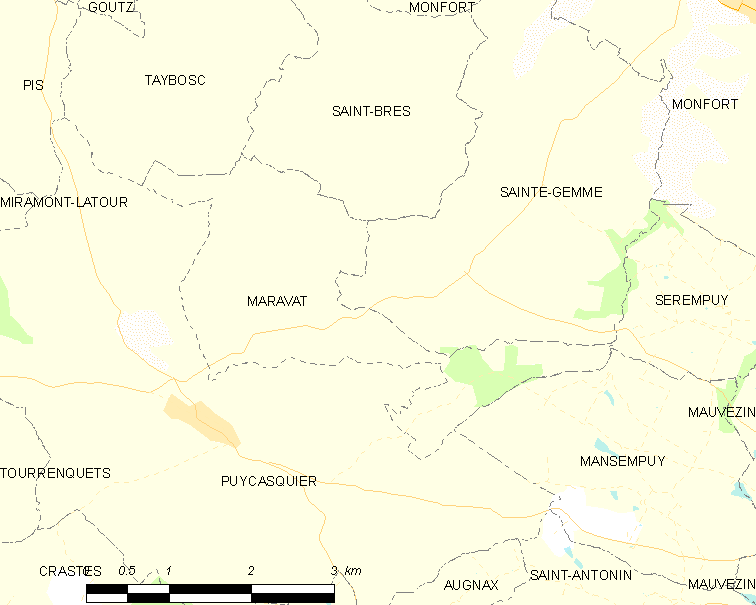
Maravat and its surrounding communes

== Population ==
Historical population
Year	Pop.	±% p.a.
1968	73	—
1975	50	−5.26%
1982	42	−2.46%
1990	47	+1.42%
1999	49	+0.46%
2007	43	−1.62%
2012	45	+0.91%
2017	43	−0.91%
2023	50	+2.55%
Source: INSEE

== See also ==
- Communes of the Gers department
