= Saint-Georges, Gers =

Saint-Georges
- Commune
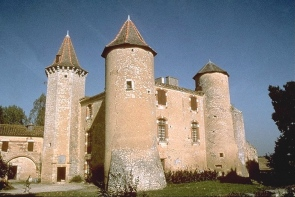
- Chateau of Le Bartas
- Location of Saint-Georges
- Location within France Location within Occitanie
- Coordinates: 43°43′43″N 0°56′13″E
- Country: France
- Region: Occitania
- Department: Gers
- Arrondissement: Condom
- Canton: Gimone-Arrats

Government
  - Mayor (2020–2026): Monique Messegue
- Area^{1}: 15.82 km^{2} (6.11 sq mi)
- Elevation: 200 m (660 ft)
- Highest elevation: 212 m (696 ft)
- Lowest elevation: 120 m (390 ft)
- Population (2023): 198
  - Density: 12.5/km^{2} (32.4/sq mi)
- Time zone: UTC+01:00 (CET)
  - Summer (DST): UTC+02:00 (CEST)
- INSEE/Postal code: 32377 /32430
- ^{1} French Land Register data, which excludes lakes, ponds, glaciers > 1 km^{2} (0.386 sq mi or 247 acres) and river estuaries.

Saint-Georges (French pronunciation: [sɛ̃ ʒɔʁʒ]; Occitan: Sent Jòrdi) is a commune in the Gers department in southwestern France.

== Geography ==
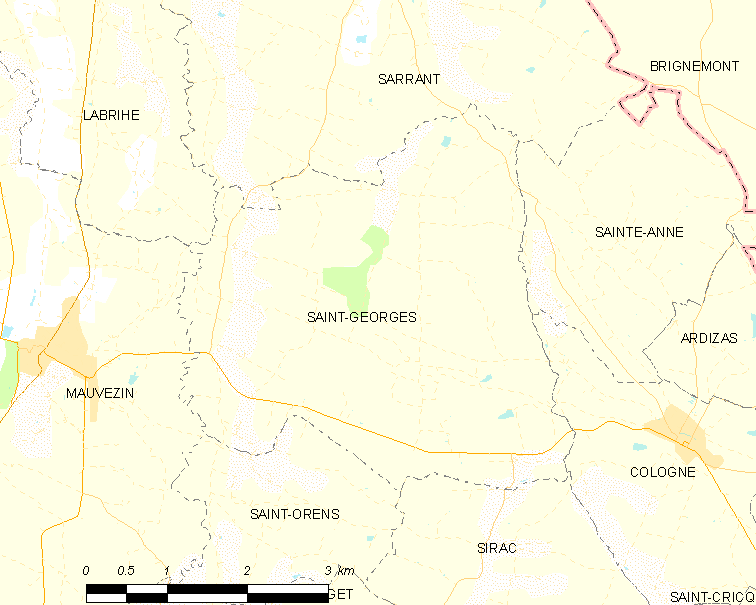
Saint-Georges and its surrounding communes

== Population ==
Historical population
Year	Pop.	±% p.a.
1968	195	—
1975	180	−1.14%
1982	162	−1.49%
1990	181	+1.40%
1999	154	−1.78%
2007	170	+1.24%
2012	176	+0.70%
2017	180	+0.45%
2023	198	+1.60%
Source: INSEE

== See also ==
- Communes of the Gers department
