= Sainte-Marie, Gers =

Sainte-Marie
- Commune
- Location of Sainte-Marie
- Location within France Location within Occitanie
- Coordinates: 43°39′42″N 0°52′32″E
- Country: France
- Region: Occitania
- Department: Gers
- Arrondissement: Auch
- Canton: Gimone-Arrats

Government
  - Mayor (2020–2026): Guy de Galard
- Area^{1}: 22.45 km^{2} (8.67 sq mi)
- Elevation: 211 m (692 ft)
- Highest elevation: 231 m (758 ft)
- Lowest elevation: 135 m (443 ft)
- Population (2023): 386
  - Density: 17.2/km^{2} (44.5/sq mi)
- Time zone: UTC+01:00 (CET)
  - Summer (DST): UTC+02:00 (CEST)
- INSEE/Postal code: 32388 /32200
- ^{1} French Land Register data, which excludes lakes, ponds, glaciers > 1 km^{2} (0.386 sq mi or 247 acres) and river estuaries.

Sainte-Marie (French pronunciation: [sɛ̃t maʁi]; Gascon: Senta Maria) is a commune in the Gers department in southwestern France.

== Geography ==
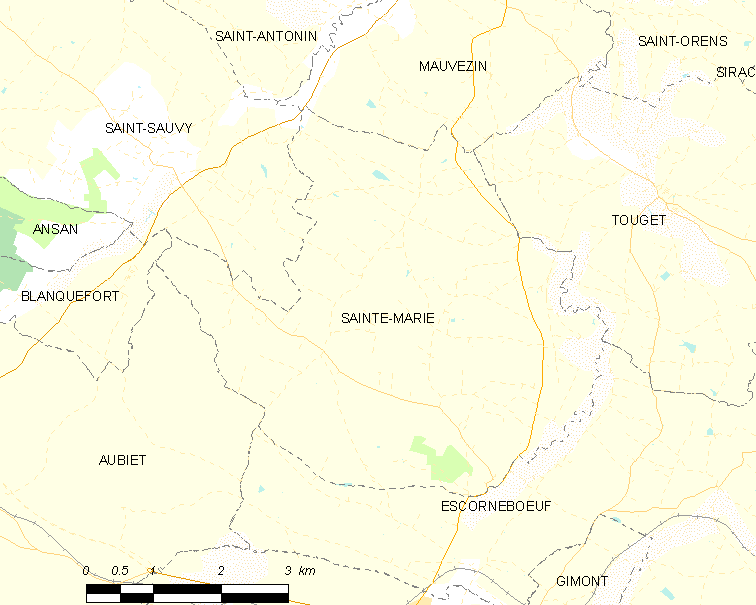
Sainte-Marie and its surrounding communes

== Population ==
Historical population
Year	Pop.	±% p.a.
1968	309	—
1975	246	−3.20%
1982	232	−0.83%
1990	208	−1.36%
1999	249	+2.02%
2007	323	+3.31%
2012	407	+4.73%
2017	429	+1.06%
2023	386	−1.74%
Source: INSEE

== See also ==
- Communes of the Gers department
