= Saint-Brès, Gers =

Saint-Brès
- Commune
- Location of Saint-Brès
- Location within France Location within Occitanie
- Coordinates: 43°46′47″N 0°46′14″E
- Country: France
- Region: Occitania
- Department: Gers
- Arrondissement: Condom
- Canton: Gimone-Arrats

Government
  - Mayor (2020–2026): Jean-Luc Silhères
- Area^{1}: 5.89 km^{2} (2.27 sq mi)
- Elevation: 180 m (590 ft)
- Highest elevation: 210 m (690 ft)
- Lowest elevation: 138 m (453 ft)
- Population (2023): 70
  - Density: 12/km^{2} (31/sq mi)
- Time zone: UTC+01:00 (CET)
  - Summer (DST): UTC+02:00 (CEST)
- INSEE/Postal code: 32366 /32120
- ^{1} French Land Register data, which excludes lakes, ponds, glaciers > 1 km^{2} (0.386 sq mi or 247 acres) and river estuaries.

Saint-Brès (French pronunciation: [sɛ̃ bʁɛs]; Occitan: Sent Brès) is a commune in the Gers department in southwestern France.

== Geography ==
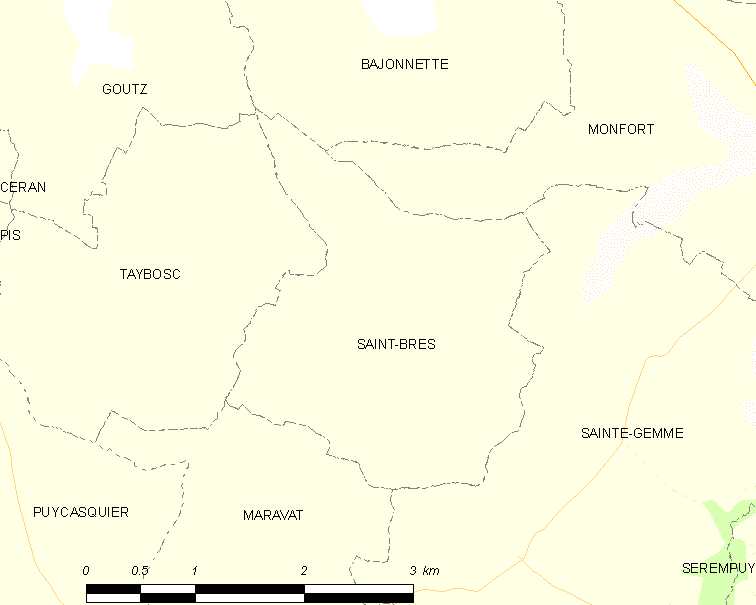
Saint-Brès and its surrounding communes

== Population ==
Historical population
Year	Pop.	±% p.a.
1968	122	—
1975	99	−2.94%
1982	79	−3.17%
1990	80	+0.16%
1999	88	+1.06%
2007	99	+1.48%
2012	83	−3.46%
2017	76	−1.75%
2023	70	−1.36%
Source: INSEE

== See also ==
- Communes of the Gers department
