= Thoux =

- Commune
- Location of Thoux
- Location within France Location within Occitanie
- Coordinates: 43°41′03″N 0°59′37″E
- Country: France
- Region: Occitania
- Department: Gers
- Arrondissement: Condom
- Canton: Gimone-Arrats

Government
  - Mayor (2020–2026): Gilles Begue
- Area^{1}: 6.12 km^{2} (2.36 sq mi)
- Elevation: 202 m (663 ft)
- Highest elevation: 214 m (702 ft)
- Lowest elevation: 147 m (482 ft)
- Population (2023): 260
  - Density: 42/km^{2} (110/sq mi)
- Time zone: UTC+01:00 (CET)
  - Summer (DST): UTC+02:00 (CEST)
- INSEE/Postal code: 32444 /32430
- ^{1} French Land Register data, which excludes lakes, ponds, glaciers > 1 km^{2} (0.386 sq mi or 247 acres) and river estuaries.

Thoux is a commune in the Gers department in southwestern France.

== Geography ==
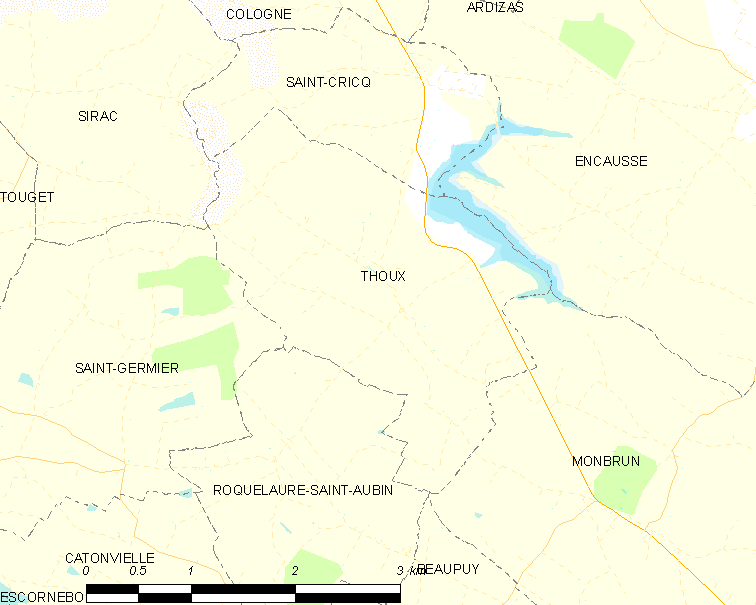
Thoux and its surrounding communes

== Population ==
Historical population
Year	Pop.	±% p.a.
1968	99	—
1975	118	+2.54%
1982	109	−1.13%
1990	136	+2.80%
1999	163	+2.03%
2007	203	+2.78%
2012	234	+2.88%
2017	253	+1.57%
2023	260	+0.46%
Source: INSEE

== See also ==
- Communes of the Gers department
