= Escornebœuf =

- Commune
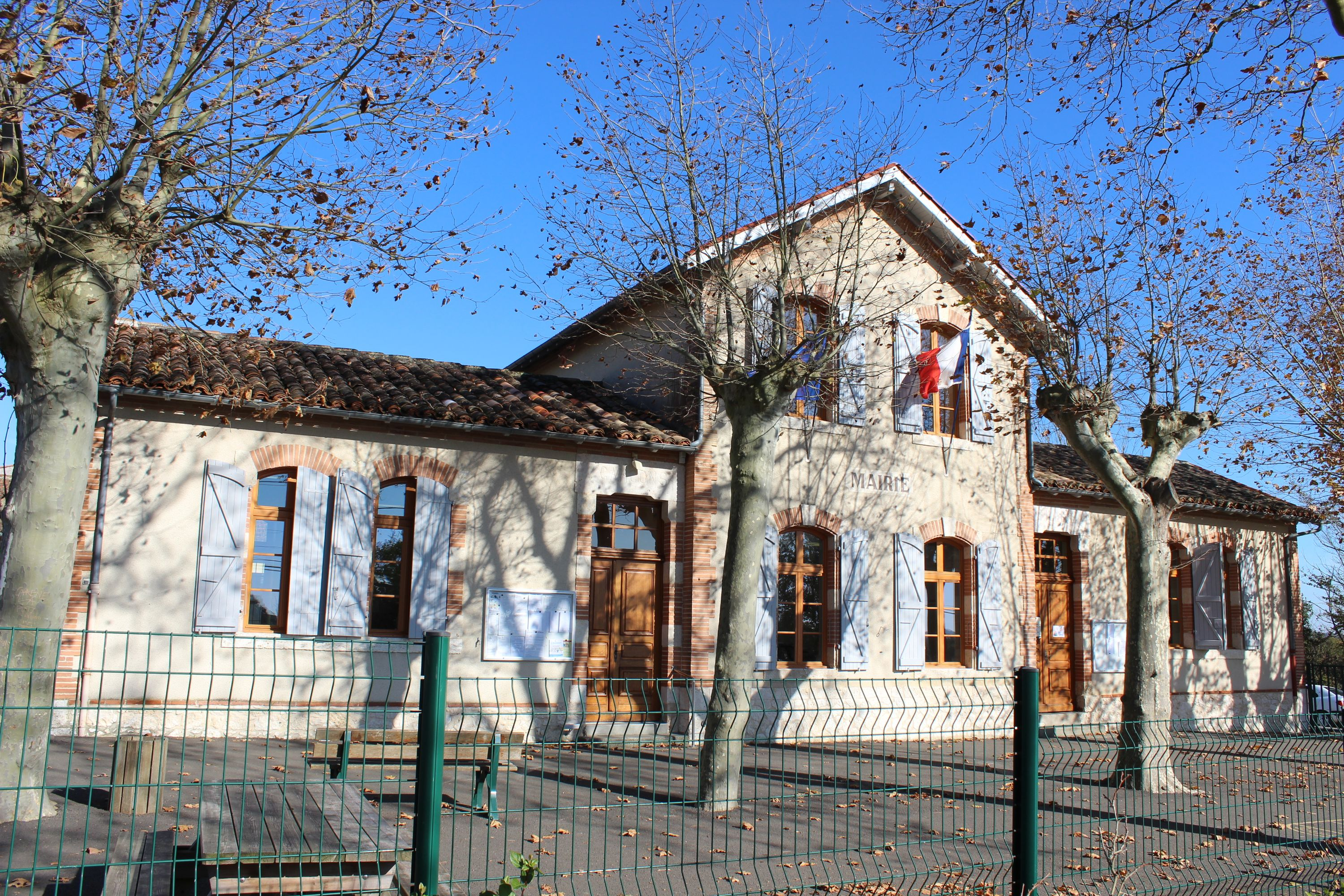
- The town hall in Escornebœuf
- Location of Escornebœuf
- Location within France Location within Occitanie
- Coordinates: 43°39′21″N 0°54′45″E
- Country: France
- Region: Occitania
- Department: Gers
- Arrondissement: Auch
- Canton: Gimone-Arrats

Government
  - Mayor (2020–2026): Sergine Ageorges
- Area^{1}: 25.45 km^{2} (9.83 sq mi)
- Elevation: 153 m (502 ft)
- Highest elevation: 232 m (761 ft)
- Lowest elevation: 135 m (443 ft)
- Population (2023): 579
  - Density: 22.8/km^{2} (58.9/sq mi)
- Time zone: UTC+01:00 (CET)
  - Summer (DST): UTC+02:00 (CEST)
- INSEE/Postal code: 32123 /32200
- ^{1} French Land Register data, which excludes lakes, ponds, glaciers > 1 km^{2} (0.386 sq mi or 247 acres) and river estuaries.

Escornebœuf (French pronunciation: [ɛskɔʁnəbœf]; Occitan: Escòrnabueu) is a commune in the Gers department in southwestern France.

== Geography ==
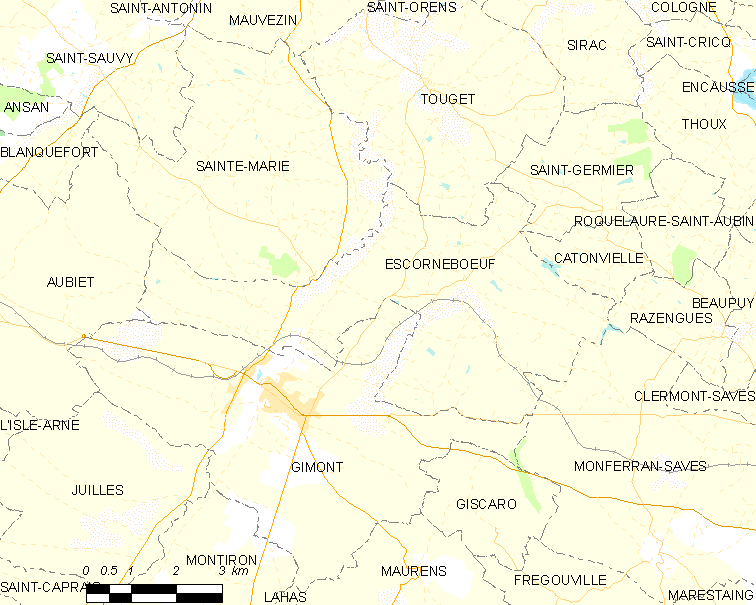
Escornebœuf and its surrounding communes

The commune is primarily rural, with agriculture being the main economic activity. The surrounding countryside features vineyards, grain fields, and livestock farming.

== Population ==
Historical population
Year	Pop.	±% p.a.
1968	434	—
1975	403	−1.05%
1982	383	−0.72%
1990	473	+2.67%
1999	497	+0.55%
2007	473	−0.62%
2012	508	+1.44%
2017	565	+2.15%
2023	579	+0.41%
Source: INSEE

== See also ==
- Communes of the Gers department
