= Sérempuy =

- Commune
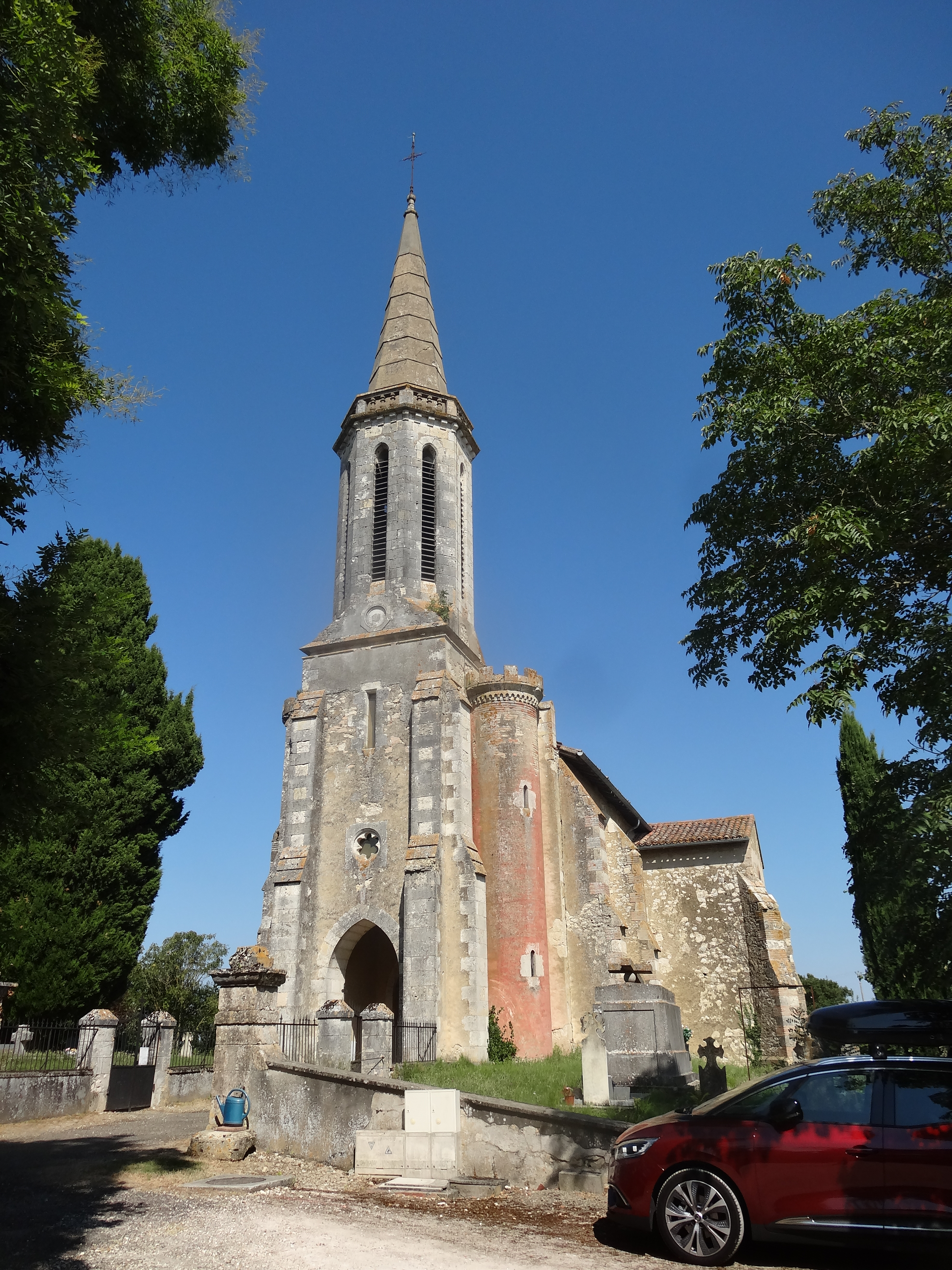
- The church in Sérempuy
- Location of Sérempuy
- Location within France Location within Occitanie
- Coordinates: 43°45′42″N 0°49′30″E
- Country: France
- Region: Occitania
- Department: Gers
- Arrondissement: Condom
- Canton: Gimone-Arrats

Government
  - Mayor (2020–2026): Serge Diana
- Area^{1}: 3.27 km^{2} (1.26 sq mi)
- Elevation: 132 m (433 ft)
- Highest elevation: 189 m (620 ft)
- Lowest elevation: 126 m (413 ft)
- Population (2023): 42
  - Density: 13/km^{2} (33/sq mi)
- Time zone: UTC+01:00 (CET)
  - Summer (DST): UTC+02:00 (CEST)
- INSEE/Postal code: 32431 /32120
- ^{1} French Land Register data, which excludes lakes, ponds, glaciers > 1 km^{2} (0.386 sq mi or 247 acres) and river estuaries.

Sérempuy is a commune in the Gers department in southwestern France.

== Geography ==
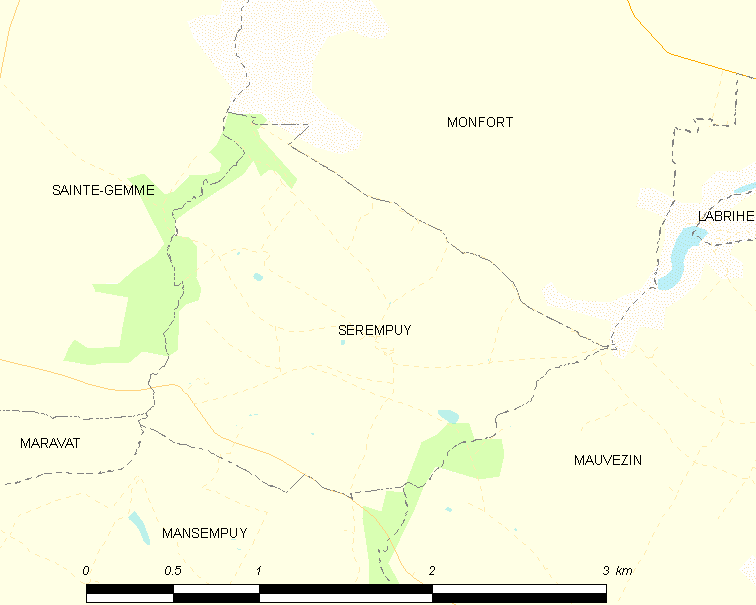
Sérempuy and its surrounding communes

== Population ==
Historical population
Year	Pop.	±% p.a.
1968	67	—
1975	48	−4.65%
1982	35	−4.41%
1990	29	−2.32%
1999	29	+0.00%
2007	38	+3.44%
2012	35	−1.63%
2017	34	−0.58%
2023	42	+3.58%
Source: INSEE

== See also ==
- Communes of the Gers department
