= Sainte-Gemme, Gers =

Sainte-Gemme
- Commune
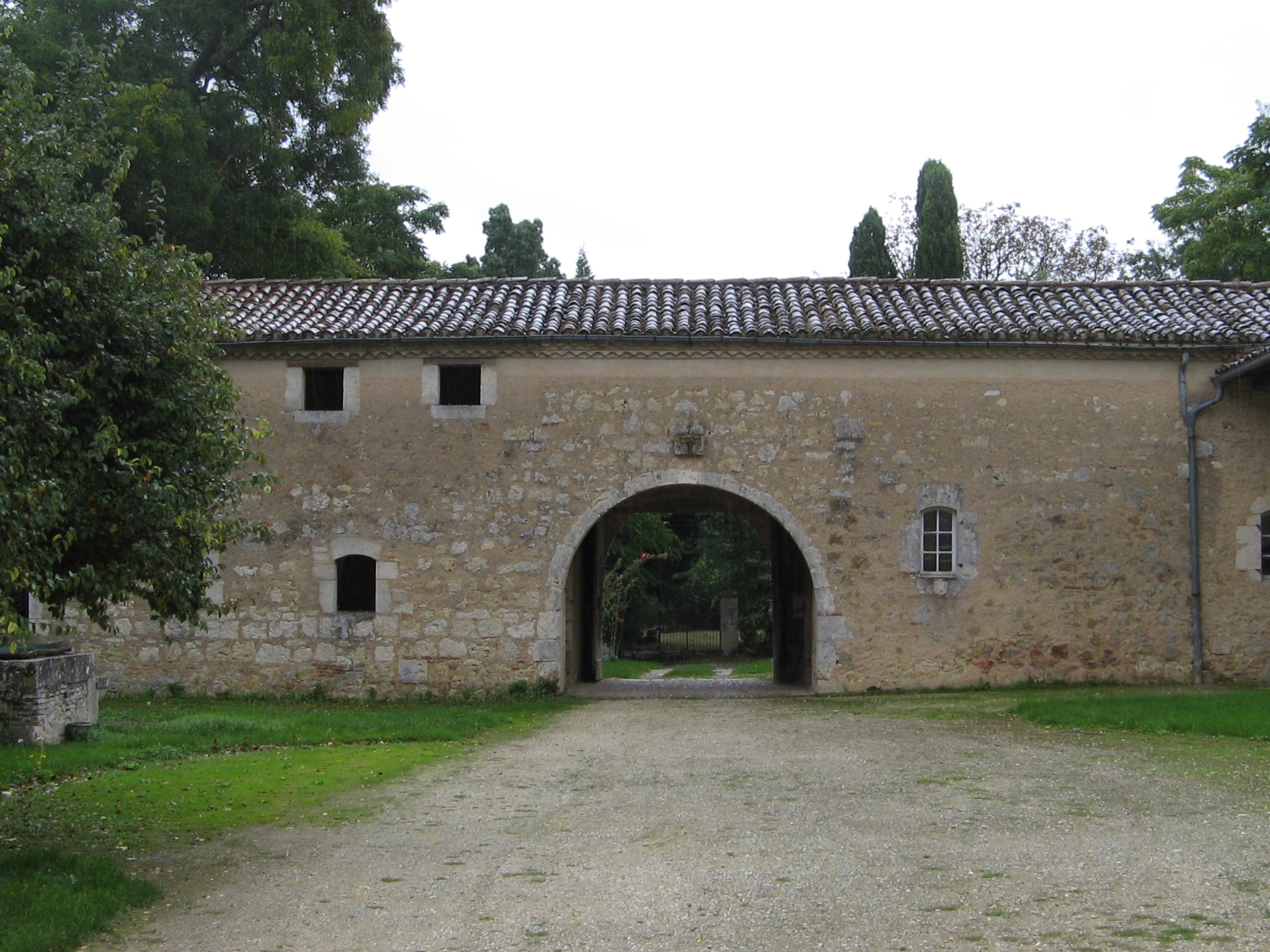
- Entrance of the Château de Lauret
- Location of Sainte-Gemme
- Location within France Location within Occitanie
- Coordinates: 43°46′57″N 0°48′01″E
- Country: France
- Region: Occitania
- Department: Gers
- Arrondissement: Condom
- Canton: Gimone-Arrats

Government
  - Mayor (2020–2026): Claude Capéran
- Area^{1}: 10.22 km^{2} (3.95 sq mi)
- Elevation: 175 m (574 ft)
- Highest elevation: 194 m (636 ft)
- Lowest elevation: 121 m (397 ft)
- Population (2023): 121
  - Density: 11.8/km^{2} (30.7/sq mi)
- Time zone: UTC+01:00 (CET)
  - Summer (DST): UTC+02:00 (CEST)
- INSEE/Postal code: 32376 /32120
- ^{1} French Land Register data, which excludes lakes, ponds, glaciers > 1 km^{2} (0.386 sq mi or 247 acres) and river estuaries.

Sainte-Gemme (French pronunciation: [sɛ̃t ʒɛm]; Occitan: Senta Gema) is a commune in the Gers department in southwestern France.

== Geography ==
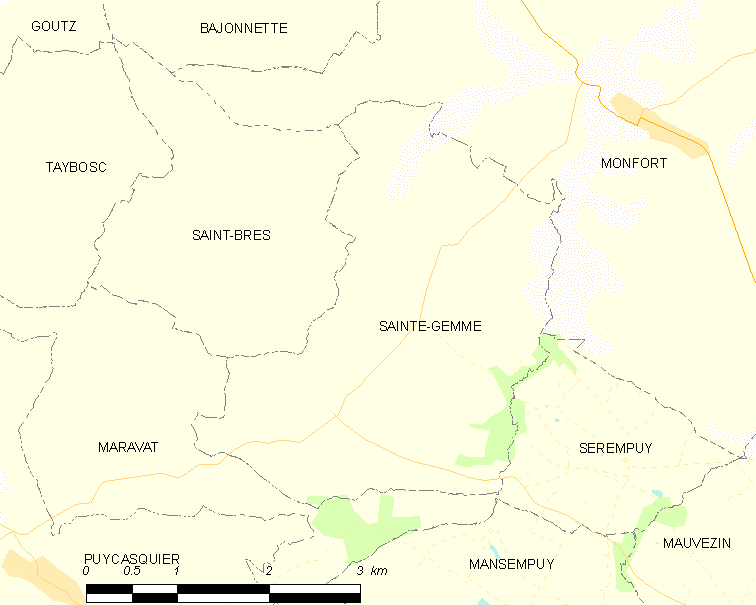
Sainte-Gemme and its surrounding communes

== Population ==
Historical population
Year	Pop.	±% p.a.
1968	175	—
1975	142	−2.94%
1982	136	−0.61%
1990	118	−1.76%
1999	100	−1.82%
2007	128	+3.13%
2012	119	−1.45%
2017	119	+0.00%
2023	121	+0.28%
Source: INSEE

== See also ==
- Communes of the Gers department
