= Ardizas =

- Commune
- Location of Ardizas
- Location within France Location within Occitanie
- Coordinates: 43°43′03″N 1°00′08″E
- Country: France
- Region: Occitania
- Department: Gers
- Arrondissement: Condom
- Canton: Gimone-Arrats

Government
  - Mayor (2020–2026): Michèle Laffitte
- Area^{1}: 8.52 km^{2} (3.29 sq mi)
- Elevation: 210 m (690 ft)
- Highest elevation: 215 m (705 ft)
- Lowest elevation: 135 m (443 ft)
- Population (2023): 217
  - Density: 25.5/km^{2} (66.0/sq mi)
- Time zone: UTC+01:00 (CET)
  - Summer (DST): UTC+02:00 (CEST)
- INSEE/Postal code: 32007 /32430
- ^{1} French Land Register data, which excludes lakes, ponds, glaciers > 1 km^{2} (0.386 sq mi or 247 acres) and river estuaries.

Ardizas is a commune in the Gers department in southwestern France.

== Geography ==
Ardizas is located in the canton of Gimone-Arrats and in the arrondissement of Condom.

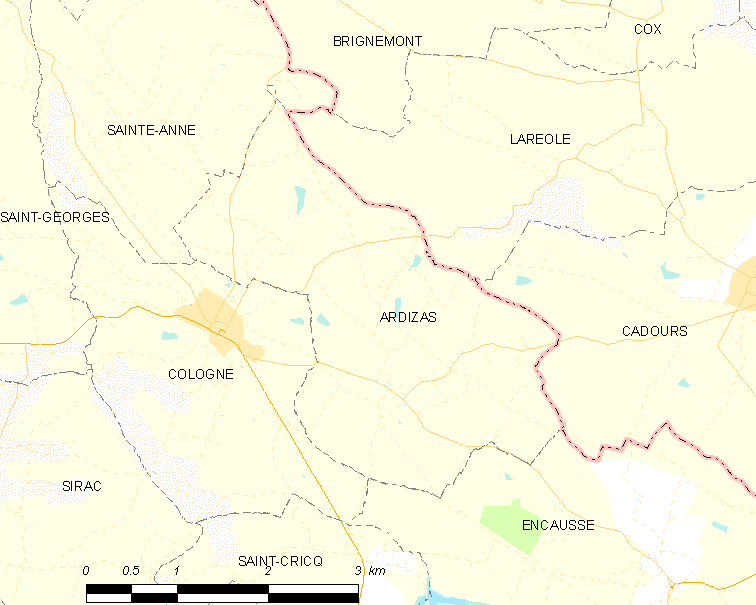
Map of Ardizas and its surrounding communes

== Population ==
Historical population
Year	Pop.	±% p.a.
1968	106	—
1975	92	−2.00%
1982	120	+3.87%
1990	127	+0.71%
1999	122	−0.45%
2007	186	+5.41%
2012	201	+1.56%
2017	216	+1.45%
2023	217	+0.08%
Source: INSEE

== See also ==
- Communes of the Gers department
