= Sarrant =

- Commune
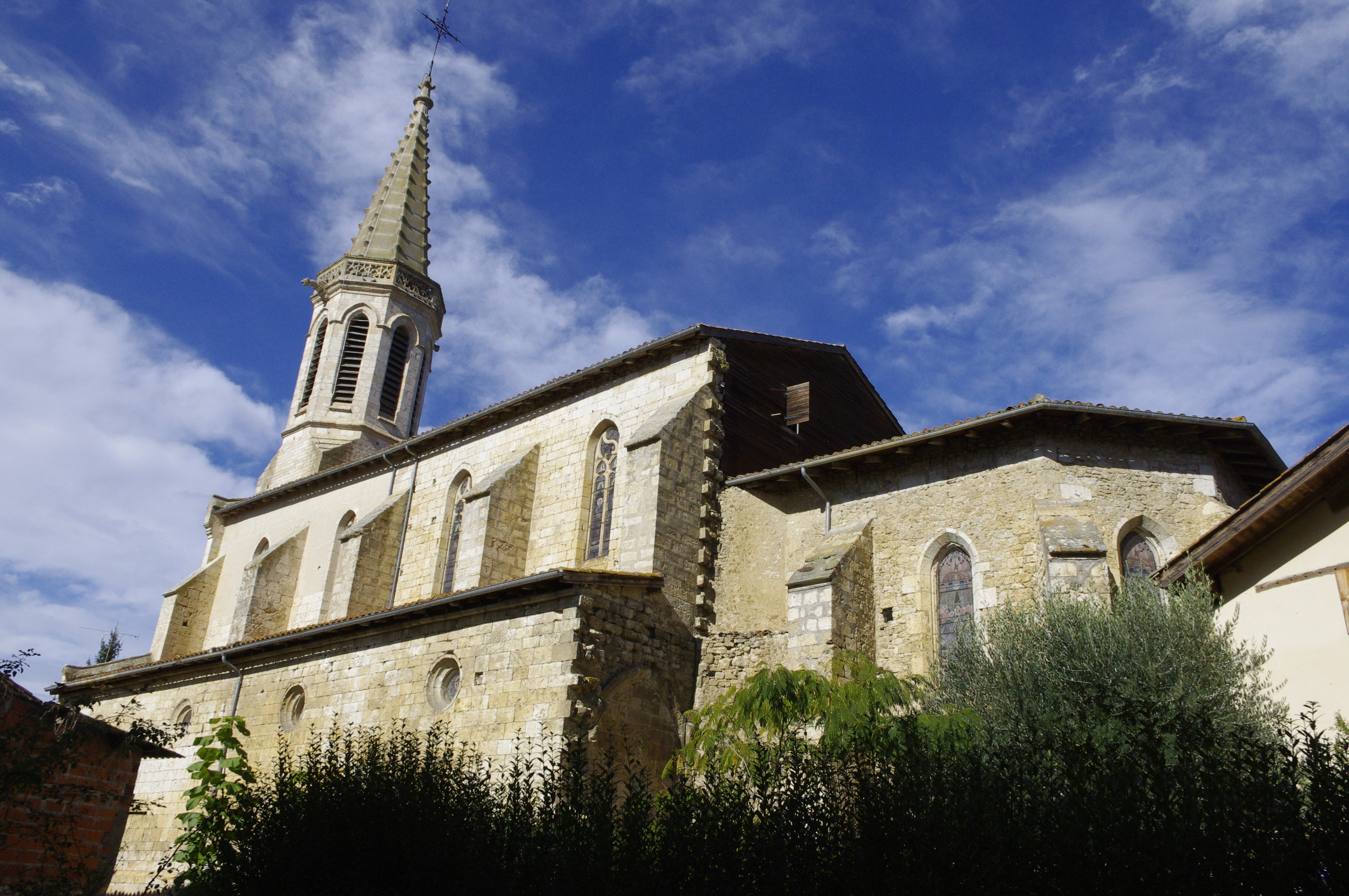
- The church in Sarrant

- Coat of arms
- Location of Sarrant
- Location within France Location within Occitanie
- Coordinates: 43°46′31″N 0°55′48″E
- Country: France
- Region: Occitania
- Department: Gers
- Arrondissement: Condom
- Canton: Gimone-Arrats
- Intercommunality: Bastides de Lomagne

Government
  - Mayor (2020–2026): Alain Berthet
- Area^{1}: 19.81 km^{2} (7.65 sq mi)
- Elevation: 130 m (430 ft)
- Highest elevation: 192 m (630 ft)
- Lowest elevation: 115 m (377 ft)
- Population (2023): 358
  - Density: 18.1/km^{2} (46.8/sq mi)
- Time zone: UTC+01:00 (CET)
  - Summer (DST): UTC+02:00 (CEST)
- INSEE/Postal code: 32416 /32120
- ^{1} French Land Register data, which excludes lakes, ponds, glaciers > 1 km^{2} (0.386 sq mi or 247 acres) and river estuaries.

Sarrant (French pronunciation: [saʁɑ̃]) is a commune in the Gers department in southwestern France. It is a member of Les Plus Beaux Villages de France (The Most Beautiful Villages of France) Association.

== Geography ==
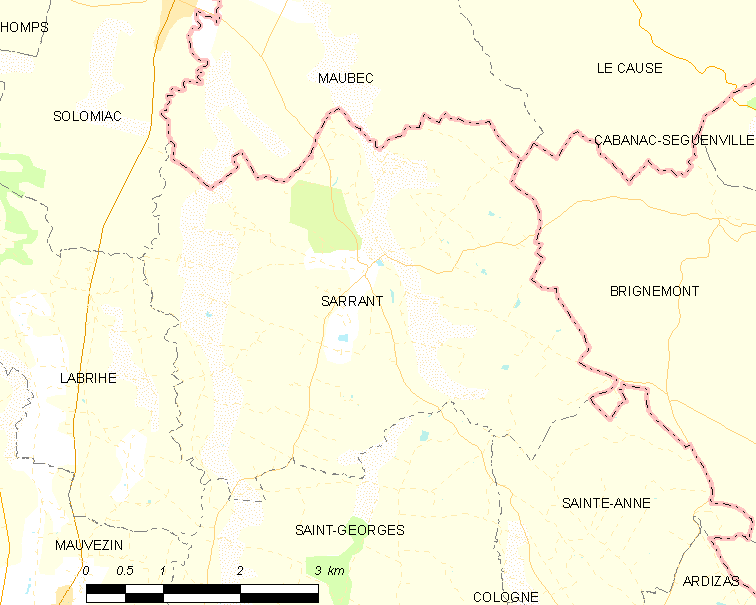
Sarrant and its surrounding communes

== History ==
The Philip IV of France (1268–1314), better known as the Fair or Iron King, set up a charter of customs, which protected the inhabitants and set the living rules in the village community. The charter dated 1265, specified the rights and duties of the residents and the co-lords. According to the charter, consuls headed the royal castrum (fortified camp, rectangular in plan) of Sarrant and not the local Lords.

== Structure ==
The houses of Sarrant create a ring around the central church of the village. This is not a common layout for a Bastide, because in general they were commercial enterprises and the market square was the central element of the village. There are many medieval and half-timbered houses in this village.

== Population ==
Historical population
Year	Pop.	±% p.a.
1968	357	—
1975	319	−1.59%
1982	312	−0.32%
1990	319	+0.28%
1999	338	+0.64%
2007	337	−0.04%
2012	399	+3.44%
2017	368	−1.60%
2023	358	−0.46%
Source: INSEE

== See also ==
- Communes of the Gers department
