= Saint-Cricq =

- Commune
- Location of Saint-Cricq
- Location within France Location within Occitanie
- Coordinates: 43°42′02″N 0°59′59″E
- Country: France
- Region: Occitania
- Department: Gers
- Arrondissement: Condom
- Canton: Gimone-Arrats

Government
  - Mayor (2020–2026): Serge Cettolo
- Area^{1}: 3.01 km^{2} (1.16 sq mi)
- Elevation: 150 m (490 ft)
- Highest elevation: 212 m (696 ft)
- Lowest elevation: 145 m (476 ft)
- Population (2023): 293
  - Density: 97.3/km^{2} (252/sq mi)
- Time zone: UTC+01:00 (CET)
  - Summer (DST): UTC+02:00 (CEST)
- INSEE/Postal code: 32372 /32430
- ^{1} French Land Register data, which excludes lakes, ponds, glaciers > 1 km^{2} (0.386 sq mi or 247 acres) and river estuaries.

Saint-Cricq (French pronunciation: [sɛ̃ kʁik]; Occitan: Sent Cric) is a commune in the Gers department in southwestern France.

== Geography ==
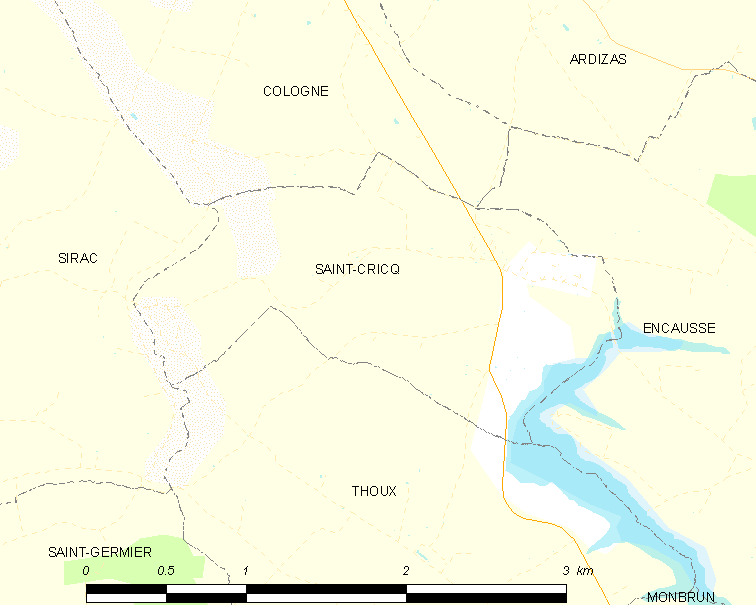
Saint-Cricq and its surrounding communes

== Population ==
Historical population
Year	Pop.	±% p.a.
1968	59	—
1975	63	+0.94%
1982	69	+1.31%
1990	94	+3.94%
1999	122	+2.94%
2007	245	+9.11%
2012	272	+2.11%
2017	293	+1.50%
2023	293	+0.00%
Source: INSEE

== See also ==
- Communes of the Gers department
