= Mansempuy =

- Commune
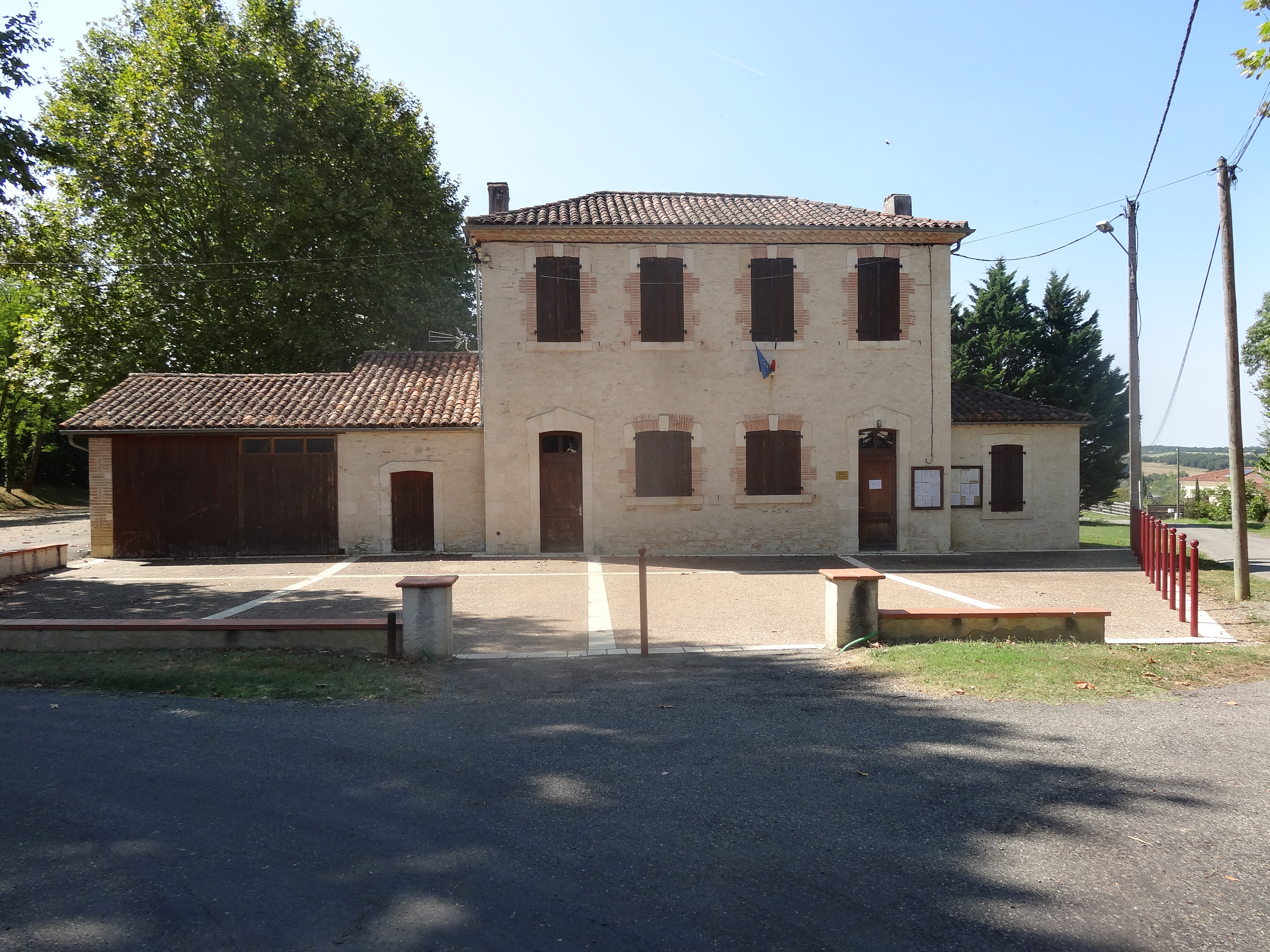
- The town hall in Mansempuy

- Coat of arms
- Location of Mansempuy
- Location within France Location within Occitanie
- Coordinates: 43°44′26″N 0°48′47″E
- Country: France
- Region: Occitania
- Department: Gers
- Arrondissement: Condom
- Canton: Gimone-Arrats

Government
  - Mayor (2020–2026): Olivier Bax
- Area^{1}: 6.33 km^{2} (2.44 sq mi)
- Elevation: 150 m (490 ft)
- Highest elevation: 202 m (663 ft)
- Lowest elevation: 137 m (449 ft)
- Population (2023): 55
  - Density: 8.7/km^{2} (23/sq mi)
- Time zone: UTC+01:00 (CET)
  - Summer (DST): UTC+02:00 (CEST)
- INSEE/Postal code: 32229 /32120
- ^{1} French Land Register data, which excludes lakes, ponds, glaciers > 1 km^{2} (0.386 sq mi or 247 acres) and river estuaries.

Mansempuy is a commune in the Gers department in southwestern France.

== Geography ==
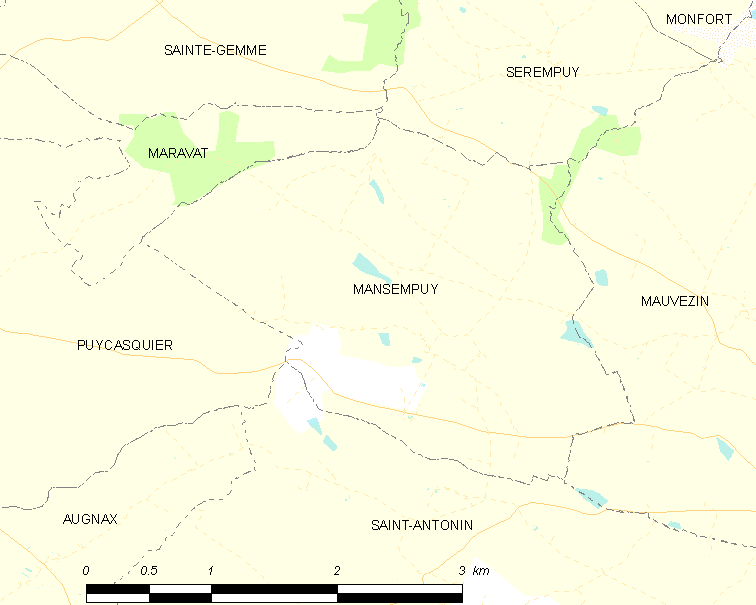
Mansempuy and its surrounding communes

== Population ==
Historical population
Year	Pop.	±% p.a.
1968	85	—
1975	81	−0.69%
1982	73	−1.47%
1990	62	−2.02%
1999	53	−1.73%
2007	76	+4.61%
2012	81	+1.28%
2017	86	+1.21%
2023	55	−7.18%
Source: INSEE

== See also ==
- Communes of the Gers department
