= Monbrun =

- Commune
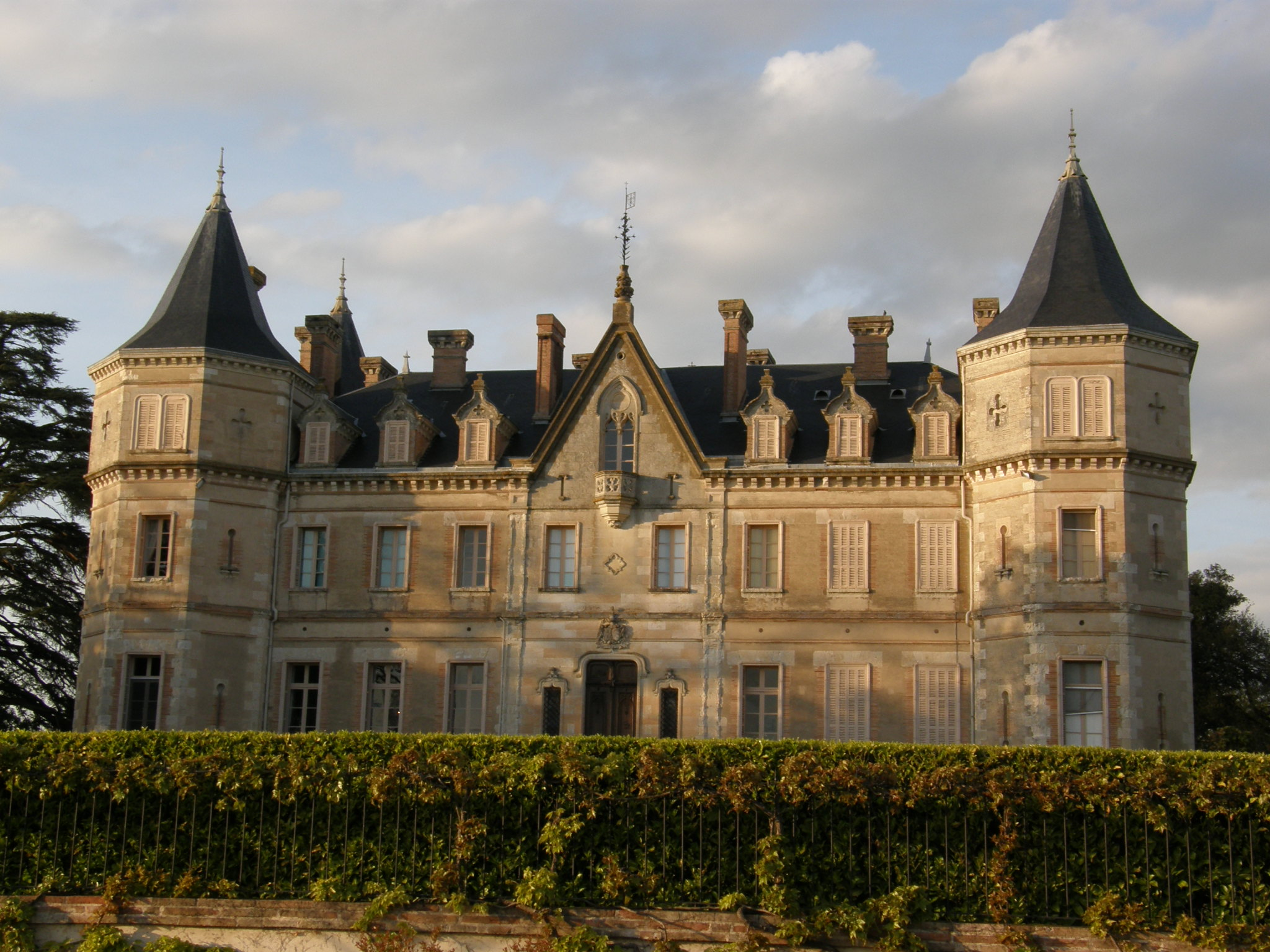
- Chateau

- Coat of arms
- Location of Monbrun
- Location within France Location within Occitanie
- Coordinates: 43°39′47″N 1°01′32″E
- Country: France
- Region: Occitania
- Department: Gers
- Arrondissement: Condom
- Canton: Gimone-Arrats

Government
  - Mayor (2020–2026): Jean-Jacques Sagansan
- Area^{1}: 10.8 km^{2} (4.2 sq mi)
- Elevation: 230 m (750 ft)
- Highest elevation: 225 m (738 ft)
- Lowest elevation: 158 m (518 ft)
- Population (2023): 394
  - Density: 36.5/km^{2} (94.5/sq mi)
- Time zone: UTC+01:00 (CET)
  - Summer (DST): UTC+02:00 (CEST)
- INSEE/Postal code: 32262 /32600
- ^{1} French Land Register data, which excludes lakes, ponds, glaciers > 1 km^{2} (0.386 sq mi or 247 acres) and river estuaries.

Monbrun (French pronunciation: [mɔ̃bʁœ̃]; Occitan: Montbrun) is a commune in the Gers department in southwestern France.

== Geography ==
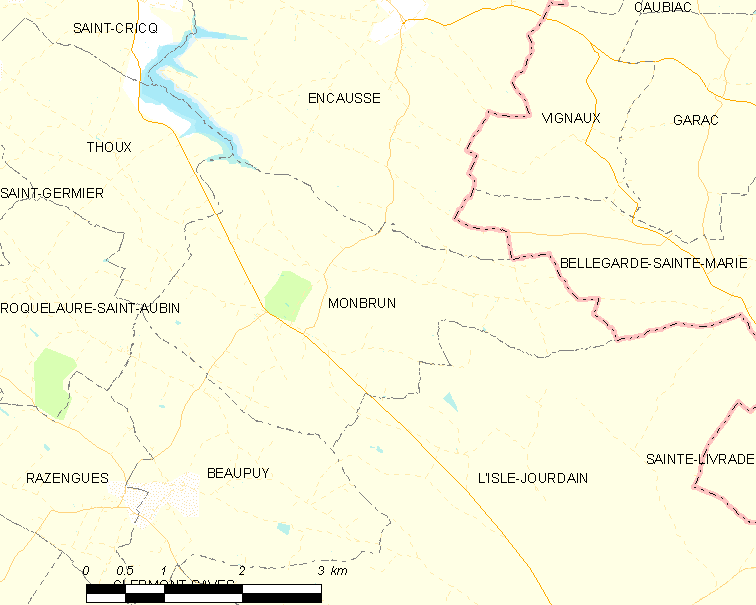
Monbrun and its surrounding communes

== Population ==
Historical population
Year	Pop.	±% p.a.
1968	238	—
1975	180	−3.91%
1982	198	+1.37%
1990	176	−1.46%
1999	214	+2.20%
2007	312	+4.83%
2012	359	+2.85%
2017	385	+1.41%
2023	394	+0.39%
Source: INSEE

== See also ==
- Communes of the Gers department
