= Bajonnette =

- Commune
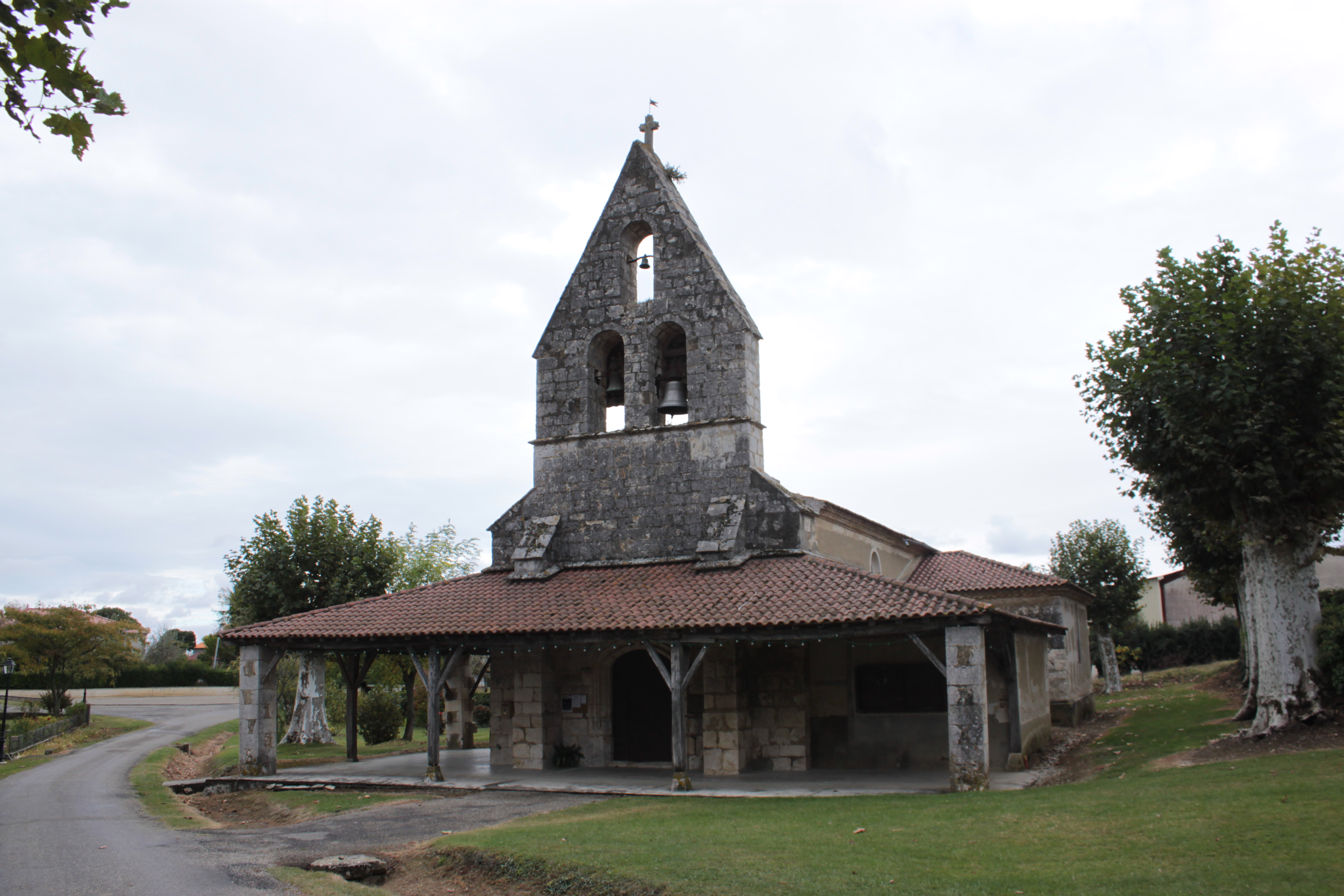
- The church in Bajonnette
- Location of Bajonnette
- Location within France Location within Occitanie
- Coordinates: 43°48′35″N 0°46′12″E
- Country: France
- Region: Occitania
- Department: Gers
- Arrondissement: Condom
- Canton: Gimone-Arrats

Government
  - Mayor (2020–2026): Alexandre Laffont
- Area^{1}: 7.48 km^{2} (2.89 sq mi)
- Elevation: 178 m (584 ft)
- Highest elevation: 212 m (696 ft)
- Lowest elevation: 134 m (440 ft)
- Population (2023): 104
  - Density: 13.9/km^{2} (36.0/sq mi)
- Time zone: UTC+01:00 (CET)
  - Summer (DST): UTC+02:00 (CEST)
- INSEE/Postal code: 32026 /32120
- ^{1} French Land Register data, which excludes lakes, ponds, glaciers > 1 km^{2} (0.386 sq mi or 247 acres) and river estuaries.

Bajonnette (French pronunciation: [baʒɔnɛt]; Occitan: Bajoneta) is a commune in the Gers department in southwestern France.

== Geography ==
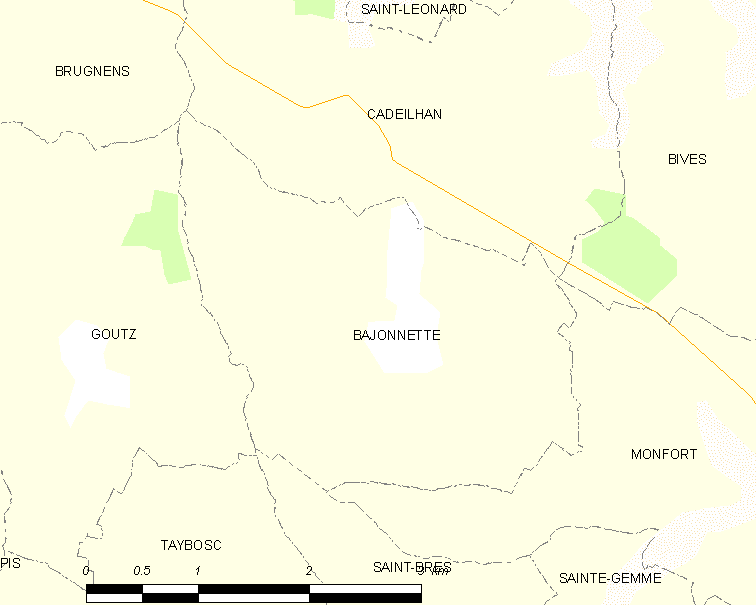
Bajonette and its surrounding communes

== Population ==
Historical population
Year	Pop.	±% p.a.
1968	159	—
1975	146	−1.21%
1982	135	−1.11%
1990	103	−3.33%
1999	92	−1.25%
2007	102	+1.30%
2012	103	+0.20%
2017	106	+0.58%
2023	104	−0.32%
Source: INSEE

== Sites of interest ==
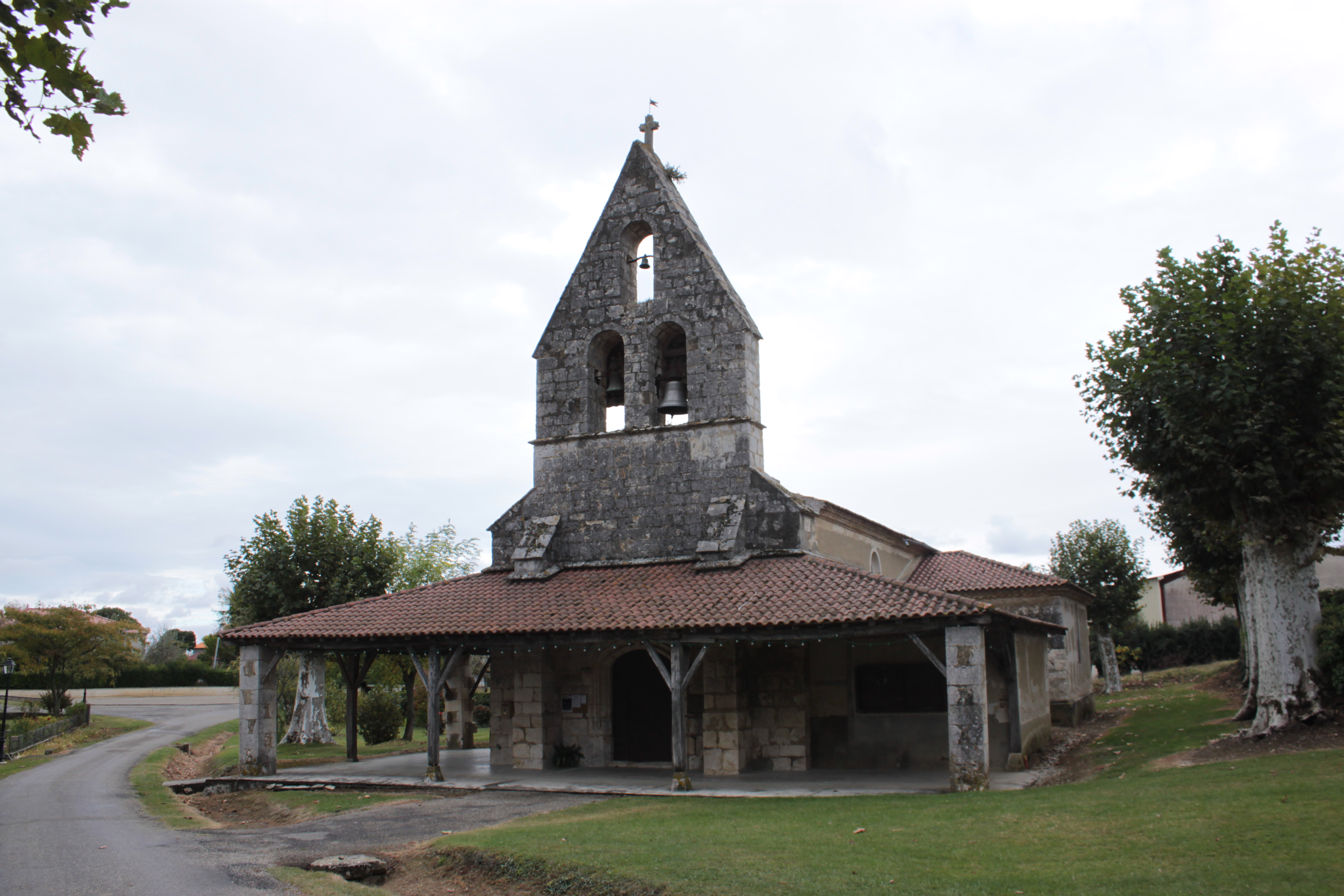
Saint-Orens church

- Saint-Orens church

== See also ==
- Communes of the Gers department
