= Canton of Gimone-Arrats =

Administrative division of Gers department, France

Coordinates: 43.63°N 0.87°E

The canton of Gimone-Arrats is an administrative division of the Gers department, southwestern France. It was created at the French canton reorganisation which came into effect in March 2015. Its seat is in Gimont.

It consists of the following communes:

1. Ardizas
2. Avensac
3. Bajonnette
4. Beaupuy
5. Catonvielle
6. Cologne
7. Encausse
8. Escornebœuf
9. Gimont
10. Giscaro
11. Homps
12. Labrihe
13. Mansempuy
14. Maravat
15. Maurens
16. Mauvezin
17. Monbrun
18. Monfort
19. Razengues
20. Roquelaure-Saint-Aubin
21. Saint-Antonin
22. Saint-Brès
23. Saint-Cricq
24. Sainte-Anne
25. Sainte-Gemme
26. Sainte-Marie
27. Saint-Georges
28. Saint-Germier
29. Saint-Orens
30. Saint-Sauvy
31. Sarrant
32. Sérempuy
33. Sirac
34. Solomiac
35. Thoux
36. Touget
