= Saint-Sauvy =

- Commune
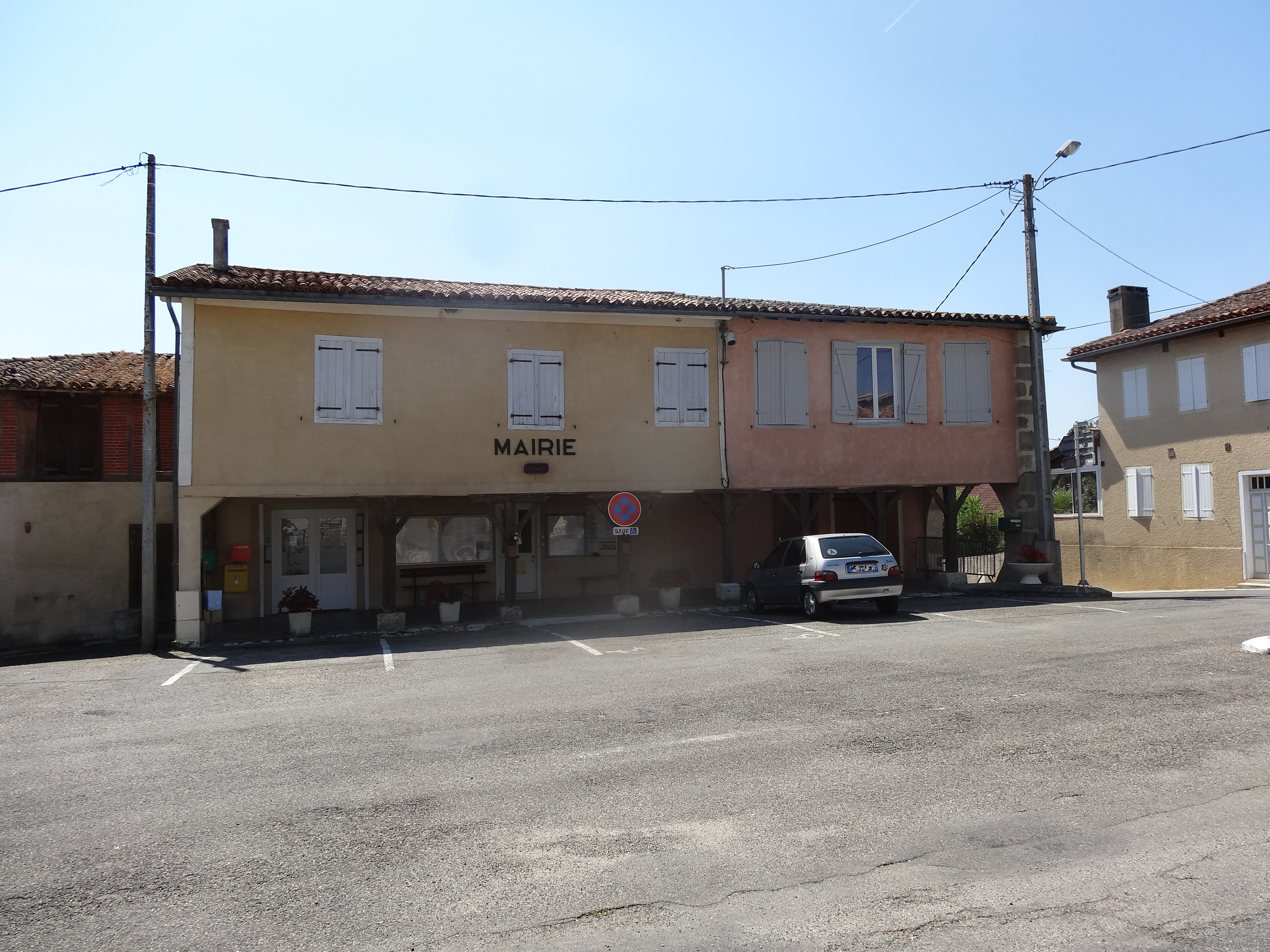
- The town hall in Saint-Sauvy

- Coat of arms
- Location of Saint-Sauvy
- Location within France Location within Occitanie
- Coordinates: 43°41′42″N 0°49′16″E
- Country: France
- Region: Occitania
- Department: Gers
- Arrondissement: Auch
- Canton: Gimone-Arrats

Government
  - Mayor (2020–2026): Joël Bernadot
- Area^{1}: 17.58 km^{2} (6.79 sq mi)
- Elevation: 150 m (490 ft)
- Highest elevation: 220 m (720 ft)
- Lowest elevation: 132 m (433 ft)
- Population (2023): 355
  - Density: 20.2/km^{2} (52.3/sq mi)
- Time zone: UTC+01:00 (CET)
  - Summer (DST): UTC+02:00 (CEST)
- INSEE/Postal code: 32406 /32270
- ^{1} French Land Register data, which excludes lakes, ponds, glaciers > 1 km^{2} (0.386 sq mi or 247 acres) and river estuaries.

Saint-Sauvy (French pronunciation: [sɛ̃ sovi]; Occitan: Sent Sauvi) is a commune in the Gers department in southwestern France.

== Geography ==
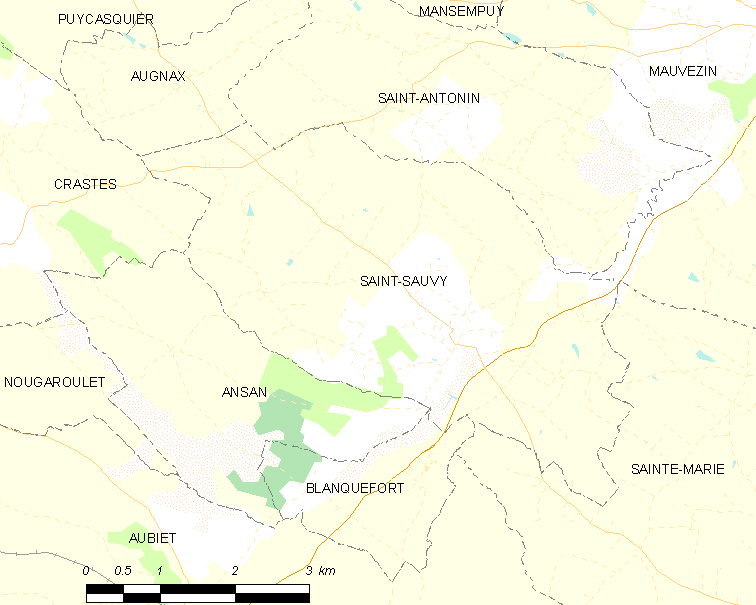
Saint-Sauvy and its surrounding communes

== Population ==
Historical population
Year	Pop.	±% p.a.
1968	390	—
1975	336	−2.11%
1982	306	−1.33%
1990	319	+0.52%
1999	331	+0.41%
2007	328	−0.11%
2012	359	+1.82%
2017	340	−1.08%
2023	355	+0.72%
Source: INSEE

== See also ==
- Communes of the Gers department
