= Sainte-Anne, Gers =

Sainte-Anne
- Commune
- Location of Sainte-Anne
- Location within France Location within Occitanie
- Coordinates: 43°44′43″N 0°58′00″E
- Country: France
- Region: Occitania
- Department: Gers
- Arrondissement: Condom
- Canton: Gimone-Arrats

Government
  - Mayor (2020–2026): Guy Lacourt
- Area^{1}: 6.74 km^{2} (2.60 sq mi)
- Elevation: 200 m (660 ft)
- Highest elevation: 192 m (630 ft)
- Lowest elevation: 125 m (410 ft)
- Population (2023): 123
  - Density: 18.2/km^{2} (47.3/sq mi)
- Time zone: UTC+01:00 (CET)
  - Summer (DST): UTC+02:00 (CEST)
- INSEE/Postal code: 32357 /32430
- ^{1} French Land Register data, which excludes lakes, ponds, glaciers > 1 km^{2} (0.386 sq mi or 247 acres) and river estuaries.

Sainte-Anne (French pronunciation: [sɛ̃t an]; Occitan: Senta Anna) is a commune in the Gers department in southwestern France.

== Geography ==
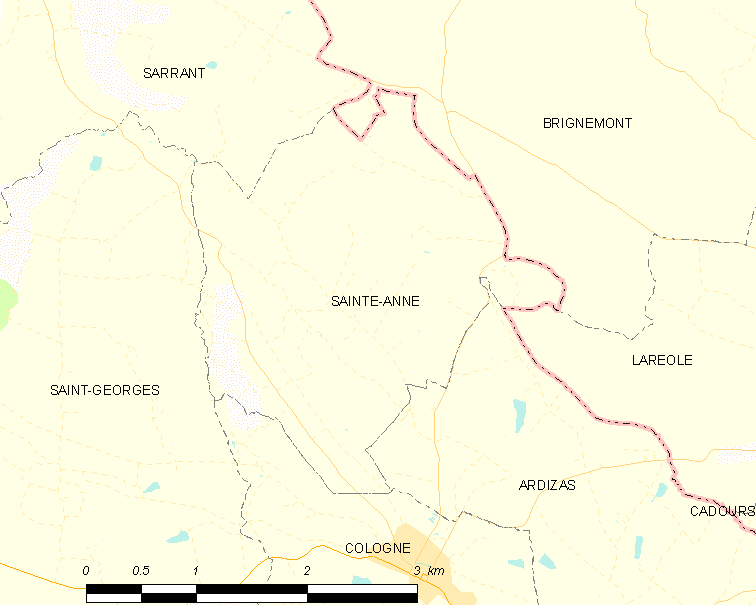
Sainte-Anne and its surrounding communes

== Population ==
Historical population
Year	Pop.	±% p.a.
1968	77	—
1975	68	−1.76%
1982	66	−0.43%
1990	55	−2.25%
1999	57	+0.40%
2007	101	+7.41%
2012	120	+3.51%
2017	117	−0.51%
2023	123	+0.84%
Source: INSEE

== See also ==
- Communes of the Gers department
