= Encausse =

- Commune
- Coat of arms
- Location of Encausse
- Location within France Location within Occitanie
- Coordinates: 43°42′N 1°02′E
- Country: France
- Region: Occitania
- Department: Gers
- Arrondissement: Condom
- Canton: Gimone-Arrats

Government
  - Mayor (2024–2026): Cédric Guyon
- Area^{1}: 15.65 km^{2} (6.04 sq mi)
- Elevation: 230 m (750 ft)
- Highest elevation: 240 m (790 ft)
- Lowest elevation: 163 m (535 ft)
- Population (2023): 445
  - Density: 28.4/km^{2} (73.6/sq mi)
- Time zone: UTC+01:00 (CET)
  - Summer (DST): UTC+02:00 (CEST)
- INSEE/Postal code: 32120 /32430
- ^{1} French Land Register data, which excludes lakes, ponds, glaciers > 1 km^{2} (0.386 sq mi or 247 acres) and river estuaries.

Encausse is a commune in the Gers department in southwestern France.

== Geography ==
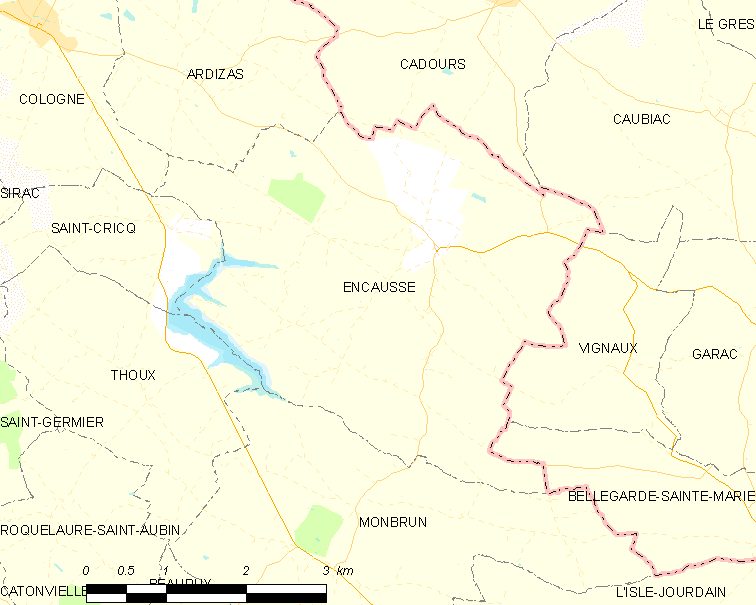
Encausse and its surrounding communes

== Population ==
Historical population
Year	Pop.	±% p.a.
1968	255	—
1975	238	−0.98%
1982	258	+1.16%
1990	274	+0.75%
1999	271	−0.12%
2007	361	+3.65%
2012	405	+2.33%
2017	427	+1.06%
2023	445	+0.69%
Source: INSEE

== See also ==
- Communes of the Gers department
