= Saint-Orens =

- Commune
- Location of Saint-Orens
- Location within France Location within Occitanie
- Coordinates: 43°42′55″N 0°54′34″E
- Country: France
- Region: Occitania
- Department: Gers
- Arrondissement: Condom
- Canton: Gimone-Arrats

Government
  - Mayor (2020–2026): Marceau Dorbes
- Area^{1}: 4.34 km^{2} (1.68 sq mi)
- Elevation: 177 m (581 ft)
- Highest elevation: 213 m (699 ft)
- Lowest elevation: 124 m (407 ft)
- Population (2023): 82
  - Density: 19/km^{2} (49/sq mi)
- Time zone: UTC+01:00 (CET)
  - Summer (DST): UTC+02:00 (CEST)
- INSEE/Postal code: 32399 /32120
- ^{1} French Land Register data, which excludes lakes, ponds, glaciers > 1 km^{2} (0.386 sq mi or 247 acres) and river estuaries.

Saint-Orens is a commune in the Gers department in southwestern France.

== Geography ==
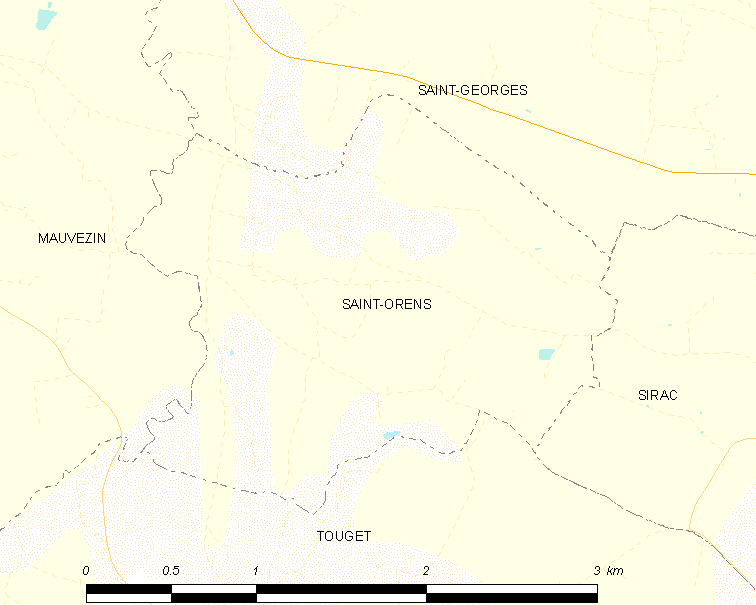
Saint-Orens and its surrounding communes

== Population ==
Historical population
Year	Pop.	±% p.a.
1968	47	—
1975	40	−2.28%
1982	39	−0.36%
1990	58	+5.09%
1999	75	+2.90%
2007	78	+0.49%
2012	85	+1.73%
2017	80	−1.21%
2023	82	+0.41%
Source: INSEE

== See also ==
- Communes of the Gers department
