= Cologne, Gers =

Cologne
- Commune
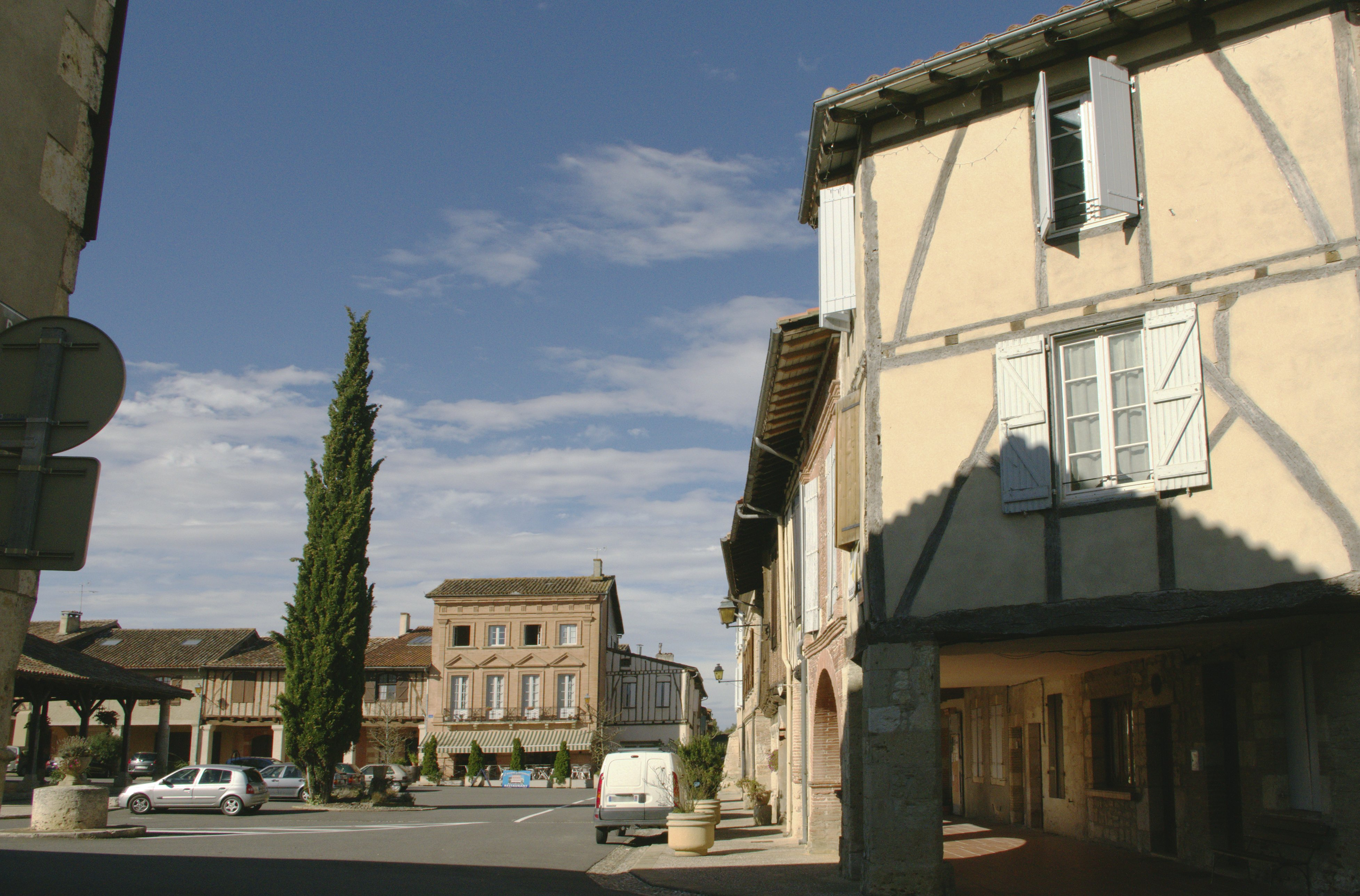
- The main square in Cologne

- Coat of arms
- Location of Cologne
- Location within France Location within Occitanie
- Coordinates: 43°43′23″N 0°58′43″E
- Country: France
- Region: Occitania
- Department: Gers
- Arrondissement: Condom
- Canton: Gimone-Arrats

Government
  - Mayor (2020–2026): Cyril Romero
- Area^{1}: 6.52 km^{2} (2.52 sq mi)
- Elevation: 199 m (653 ft)
- Highest elevation: 214 m (702 ft)
- Lowest elevation: 134 m (440 ft)
- Population (2023): 947
  - Density: 145/km^{2} (376/sq mi)
- Time zone: UTC+01:00 (CET)
  - Summer (DST): UTC+02:00 (CEST)
- INSEE/Postal code: 32106 /32430
- ^{1} French Land Register data, which excludes lakes, ponds, glaciers > 1 km^{2} (0.386 sq mi or 247 acres) and river estuaries.

Cologne (French pronunciation: [kɔlɔɲ]; Occitan: Colonha) is a commune in the Gers department in southwestern France.

== Geography ==
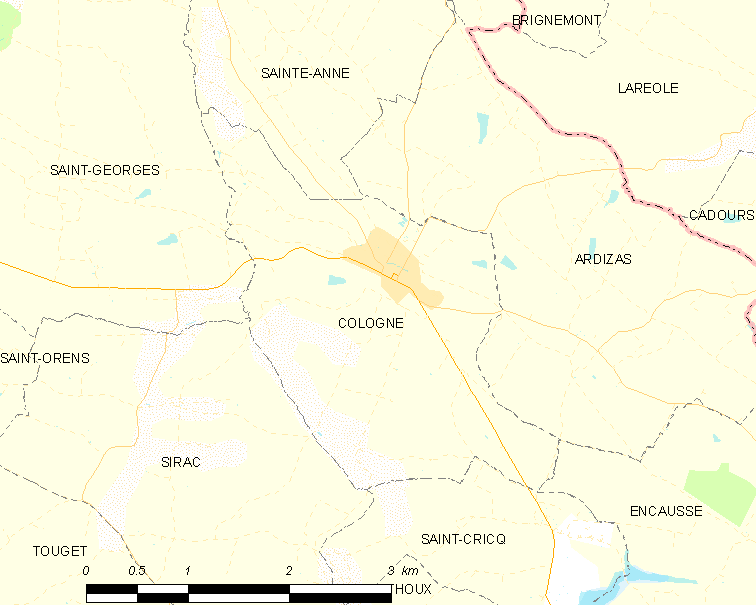
Cologne and its surrounding communes

== Population ==
Historical population
Year	Pop.	±% p.a.
1968	407	—
1975	510	+3.28%
1982	515	+0.14%
1990	519	+0.10%
1999	510	−0.19%
2007	777	+5.40%
2012	885	+2.64%
2017	914	+0.65%
2023	947	+0.59%
Source: INSEE

== See also ==
- Communes of the Gers department
