= Razengues =

- Commune
- Coat of arms
- Location of Razengues
- Location within France Location within Occitanie
- Coordinates: 43°38′32″N 0°59′53″E
- Country: France
- Region: Occitania
- Department: Gers
- Arrondissement: Auch
- Canton: Gimone-Arrats

Government
  - Mayor (2020–2026): Janine Barioulet-Lahirle
- Area^{1}: 4.35 km^{2} (1.68 sq mi)
- Elevation: 147 m (482 ft)
- Highest elevation: 231 m (758 ft)
- Lowest elevation: 178 m (584 ft)
- Population (2023): 263
  - Density: 60.5/km^{2} (157/sq mi)
- Time zone: UTC+01:00 (CET)
  - Summer (DST): UTC+02:00 (CEST)
- INSEE/Postal code: 32339 /32600
- ^{1} French Land Register data, which excludes lakes, ponds, glaciers > 1 km^{2} (0.386 sq mi or 247 acres) and river estuaries.

Razengues is a commune in the Gers department in southwestern France.

== Geography ==
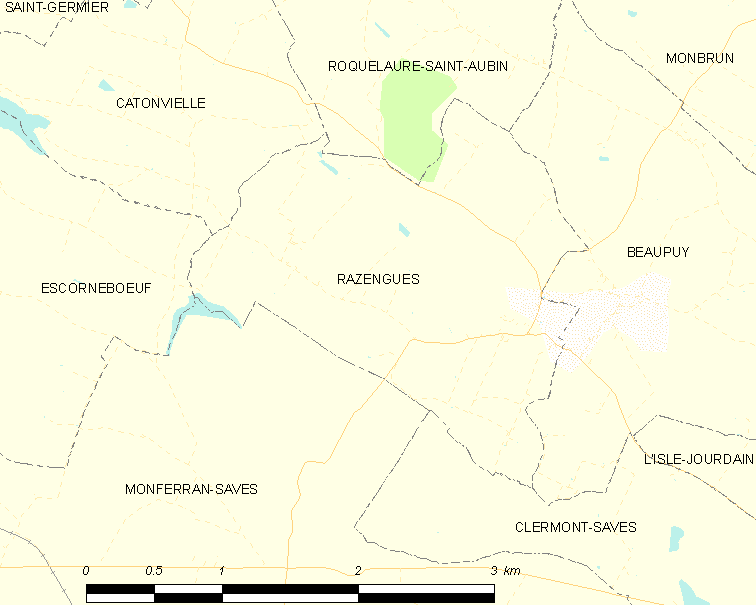
Razengues and its surrounding communes

== Population ==
Historical population
Year	Pop.	±% p.a.
1968	96	—
1975	95	−0.15%
1982	84	−1.74%
1990	93	+1.28%
1999	104	+1.25%
2007	169	+6.26%
2012	204	+3.84%
2017	239	+3.22%
2023	263	+1.61%
Source: INSEE

== See also ==
- Communes of the Gers department
