= Touget =

- Commune
- Coat of arms
- Location of Touget
- Location within France Location within Occitanie
- Coordinates: 43°41′28″N 0°54′57″E
- Country: France
- Region: Occitania
- Department: Gers
- Arrondissement: Condom
- Canton: Gimone-Arrats

Government
  - Mayor (2025–2026): Anne Labat
- Area^{1}: 17.72 km^{2} (6.84 sq mi)
- Elevation: 120 m (390 ft)
- Highest elevation: 215 m (705 ft)
- Lowest elevation: 130 m (430 ft)
- Population (2023): 495
  - Density: 27.9/km^{2} (72.4/sq mi)
- Time zone: UTC+01:00 (CET)
  - Summer (DST): UTC+02:00 (CEST)
- INSEE/Postal code: 32448 /32430
- ^{1} French Land Register data, which excludes lakes, ponds, glaciers > 1 km^{2} (0.386 sq mi or 247 acres) and river estuaries.

Touget (French pronunciation: [tuʒɛ]; Gascon: Tojet) is a commune in the Gers department in southwestern France.

== Geography ==
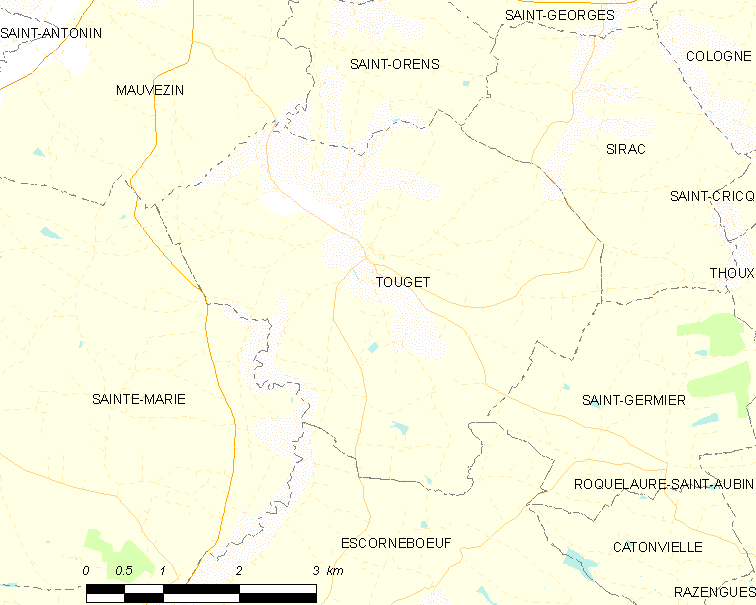
Touget and its surrounding communes

== Population ==
Historical population
Year	Pop.	±% p.a.
1968	389	—
1975	349	−1.54%
1982	321	−1.19%
1990	312	−0.35%
1999	320	+0.28%
2007	477	+5.12%
2012	518	+1.66%
2017	512	−0.23%
2023	495	−0.56%
Source: INSEE

== See also ==
- Communes of the Gers department
