= Catonvielle =

- Commune
- Location of Catonvielle
- Location within France Location within Occitanie
- Coordinates: 43°39′38″N 0°57′47″E
- Country: France
- Region: Occitania
- Department: Gers
- Arrondissement: Condom
- Canton: Gimone-Arrats

Government
  - Mayor (2024–2026): Yvette Sliva
- Area^{1}: 3.07 km^{2} (1.19 sq mi)
- Elevation: 214 m (702 ft)
- Highest elevation: 213 m (699 ft)
- Lowest elevation: 153 m (502 ft)
- Population (2023): 105
  - Density: 34.2/km^{2} (88.6/sq mi)
- Time zone: UTC+01:00 (CET)
  - Summer (DST): UTC+02:00 (CEST)
- INSEE/Postal code: 32092 /32200
- ^{1} French Land Register data, which excludes lakes, ponds, glaciers > 1 km^{2} (0.386 sq mi or 247 acres) and river estuaries.

Catonvielle (French pronunciation: [katɔ̃vjɛl]; Occitan: Catonvièla) is a commune in the Gers department in southwestern France.

== Geography ==
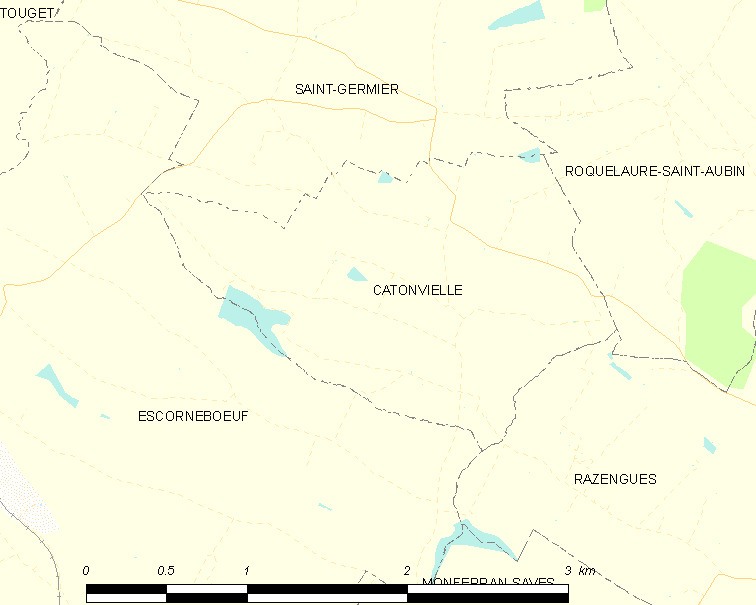
Catonvielle and its surrounding communes

== Population ==
Historical population
Year	Pop.	±% p.a.
1968	73	—
1975	73	+0.00%
1982	74	+0.19%
1990	73	−0.17%
1999	62	−1.80%
2007	85	+4.02%
2012	107	+4.71%
2017	97	−1.94%
2023	105	+1.33%
Source: INSEE

== See also ==
- Communes of the Gers department
