= Solomiac =

- Commune
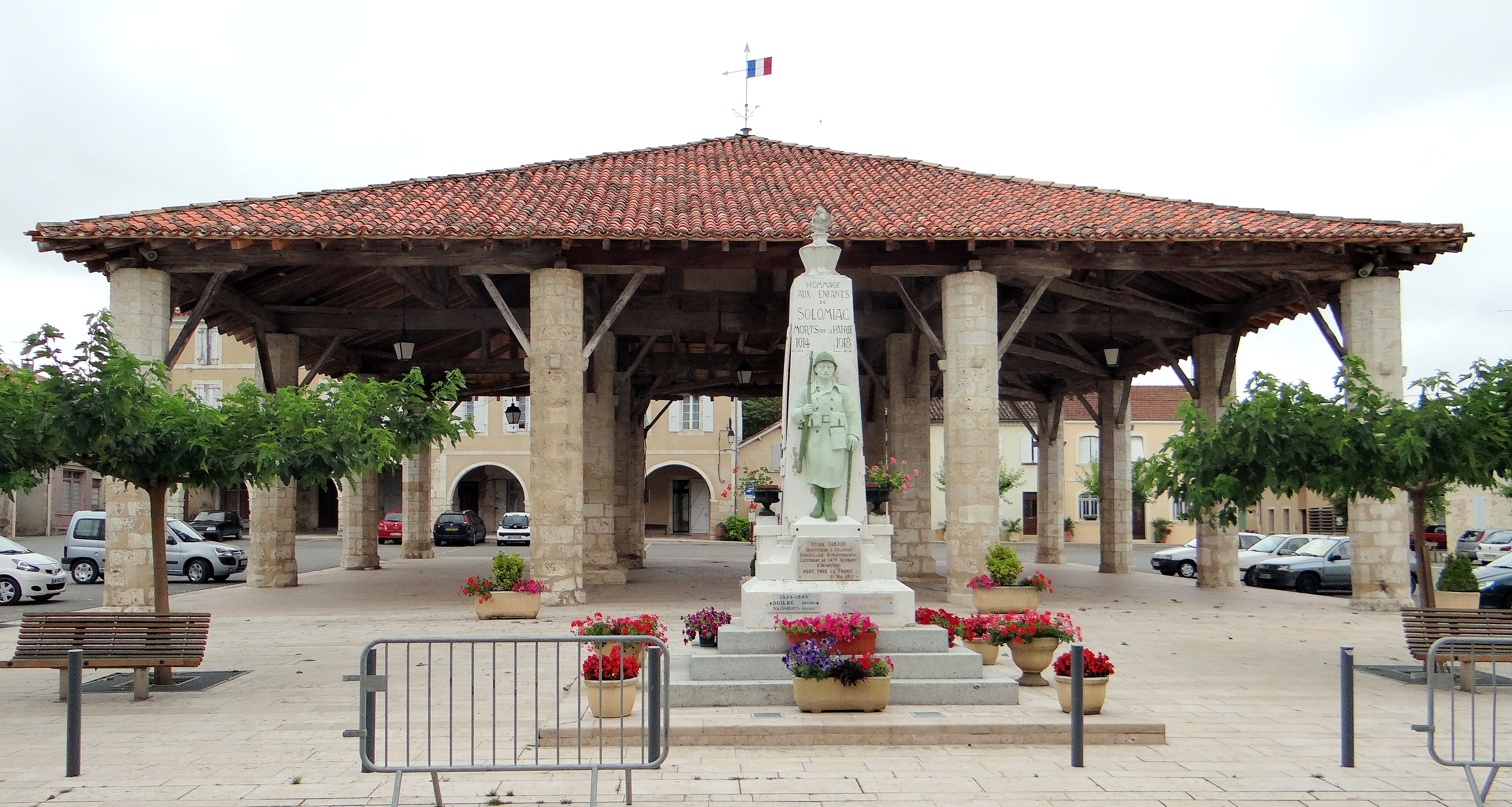
- War memorial and market hall
- Location of Solomiac
- Location within France Location within Occitanie
- Coordinates: 43°48′23″N 0°53′54″E
- Country: France
- Region: Occitania
- Department: Gers
- Arrondissement: Condom
- Canton: Gimone-Arrats

Government
  - Mayor (2020–2026): Guy Mantovani
- Area^{1}: 13.8 km^{2} (5.3 sq mi)
- Elevation: 113 m (371 ft)
- Highest elevation: 202 m (663 ft)
- Lowest elevation: 115 m (377 ft)
- Population (2023): 496
  - Density: 35.9/km^{2} (93.1/sq mi)
- Time zone: UTC+01:00 (CET)
  - Summer (DST): UTC+02:00 (CEST)
- INSEE/Postal code: 32436 /32120
- ^{1} French Land Register data, which excludes lakes, ponds, glaciers > 1 km^{2} (0.386 sq mi or 247 acres) and river estuaries.

Solomiac (French pronunciation: [sɔlɔmjak]) is a commune in the Gers department in southwestern France.

== Geography ==
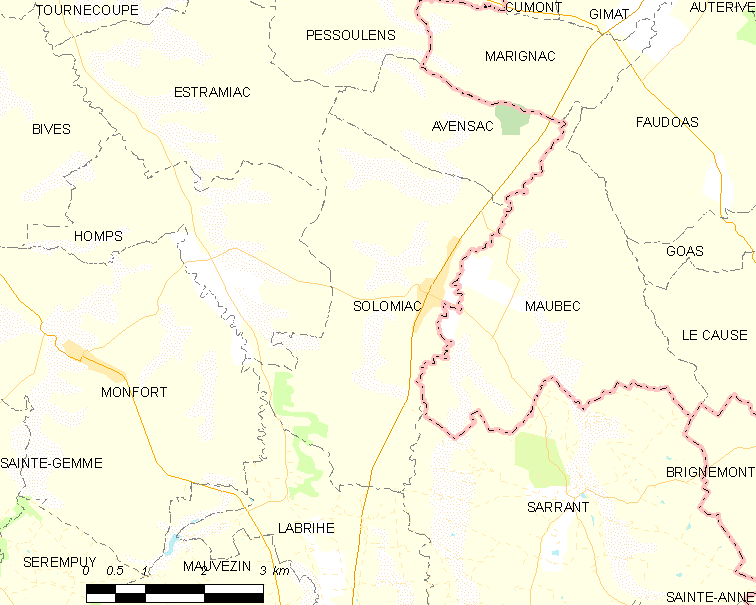
Solomiac and its surrounding communes

== History ==
Solomiac was founded in 1322, by the Planselve Abbey, the Cistercian monastery, which was active from 1143 until 1789 and Beraud, the Seneschal of Solomiac.

== Structure ==
This Bastide has the typical central market square with the halle, the market building in the center of this open space. The market building is built with stone with wooden and stone pillars on the roof. Around this area there are the typical stone houses with the arcades. At the top of the square, where is a church.

== Population ==
Historical population
Year	Pop.	±% p.a.
1968	505	—
1975	446	−1.76%
1982	391	−1.86%
1990	363	−0.92%
1999	364	+0.03%
2007	414	+1.62%
2012	501	+3.89%
2017	481	−0.81%
2023	496	+0.51%
Source: INSEE

== See also ==
- Communes of the Gers department
- "Select Solomiac, at All Bastides". John Reps Collection. Cornell University Library.
