= Saint-Germier, Gers =

Saint-Germier
- Commune
- Location of Saint-Germier
- Location within France Location within Occitanie
- Coordinates: 43°40′04″N 0°57′06″E
- Country: France
- Region: Occitania
- Department: Gers
- Arrondissement: Condom
- Canton: Gimone-Arrats

Government
  - Mayor (2020–2026): Marie-José Seychal
- Area^{1}: 7.05 km^{2} (2.72 sq mi)
- Elevation: 200 m (660 ft)
- Highest elevation: 213 m (699 ft)
- Lowest elevation: 145 m (476 ft)
- Population (2023): 212
  - Density: 30.1/km^{2} (77.9/sq mi)
- Time zone: UTC+01:00 (CET)
  - Summer (DST): UTC+02:00 (CEST)
- INSEE/Postal code: 32379 /32200
- ^{1} French Land Register data, which excludes lakes, ponds, glaciers > 1 km^{2} (0.386 sq mi or 247 acres) and river estuaries.

Saint-Germier (French pronunciation: [sɛ̃ ʒɛʁmje]; Gascon: Sent Germer) is a commune in the Gers department in southwestern France.

== Geography ==
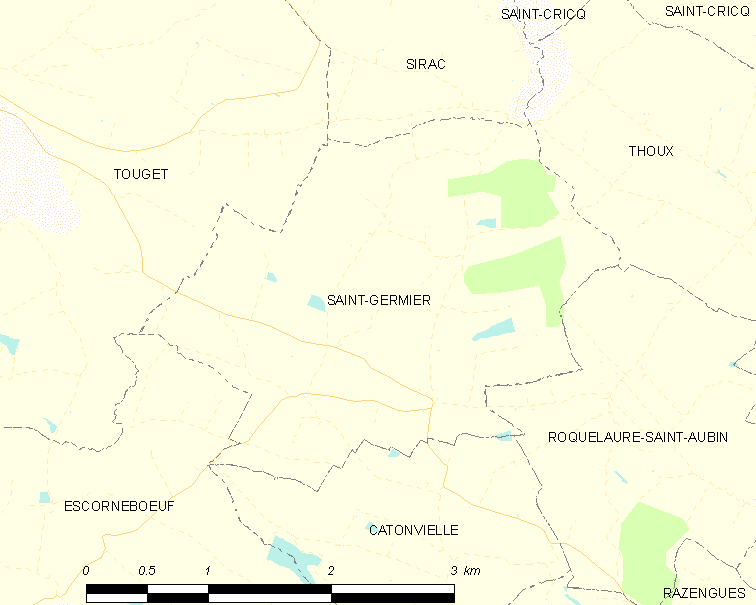
Saint-Germier and its surrounding communes

== Population ==
Historical population
Year	Pop.	±% p.a.
1968	121	—
1975	92	−3.84%
1982	96	+0.61%
1990	112	+1.95%
1999	115	+0.29%
2007	196	+6.89%
2012	215	+1.87%
2017	210	−0.47%
2023	212	+0.16%
Source: INSEE

== See also ==
- Communes of the Gers department
