= Sirac, Gers =

Sirac
- Commune
- Coat of arms
- Location of Sirac
- Location within France Location within Occitanie
- Coordinates: 43°42′41″N 0°57′05″E
- Country: France
- Region: Occitania
- Department: Gers
- Arrondissement: Condom
- Canton: Gimone-Arrats

Government
  - Mayor (2020–2026): Didier Williame
- Area^{1}: 8 km^{2} (3.1 sq mi)
- Elevation: 200 m (660 ft)
- Highest elevation: 215 m (705 ft)
- Lowest elevation: 137 m (449 ft)
- Population (2023): 164
  - Density: 20/km^{2} (53/sq mi)
- Time zone: UTC+01:00 (CET)
  - Summer (DST): UTC+02:00 (CEST)
- INSEE/Postal code: 32435 /32430
- ^{1} French Land Register data, which excludes lakes, ponds, glaciers > 1 km^{2} (0.386 sq mi or 247 acres) and river estuaries.

Sirac (French pronunciation: [siʁak]) is a commune in the Gers department in southwestern France.

== Geography ==
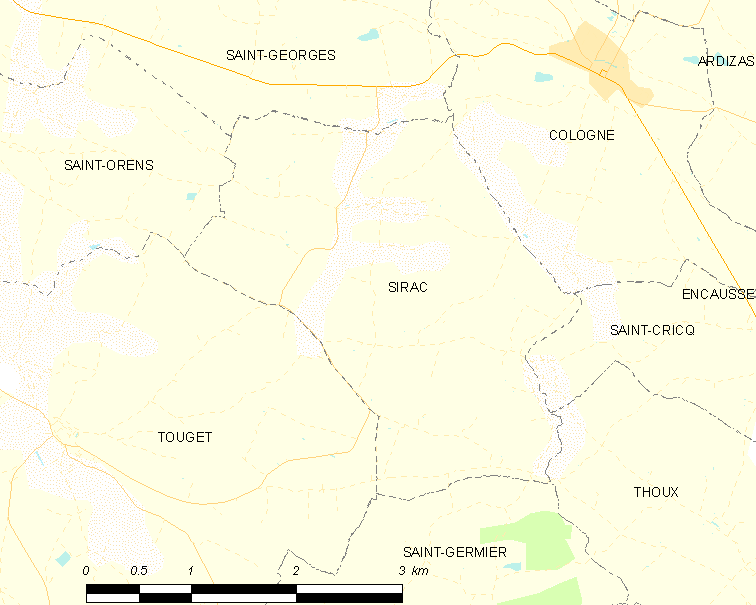
Sirac and its surrounding communes

== Population ==
Historical population
| Year | Pop. | ±% p.a. |
|---|---|---|
| 1968 | 162 | — |
| 1975 | 134 | −2.67% |
| 1982 | 106 | −3.29% |
| 1990 | 98 | −0.98% |
| 1999 | 101 | +0.34% |
| 2007 | 111 | +1.19% |
| 2012 | 150 | +6.21% |
| 2017 | 169 | +2.41% |
| 2023 | 164 | −0.50% |
Source: INSEE

== See also ==
- Communes of the Gers department
