= Maurens, Gers =

Maurens
- Commune
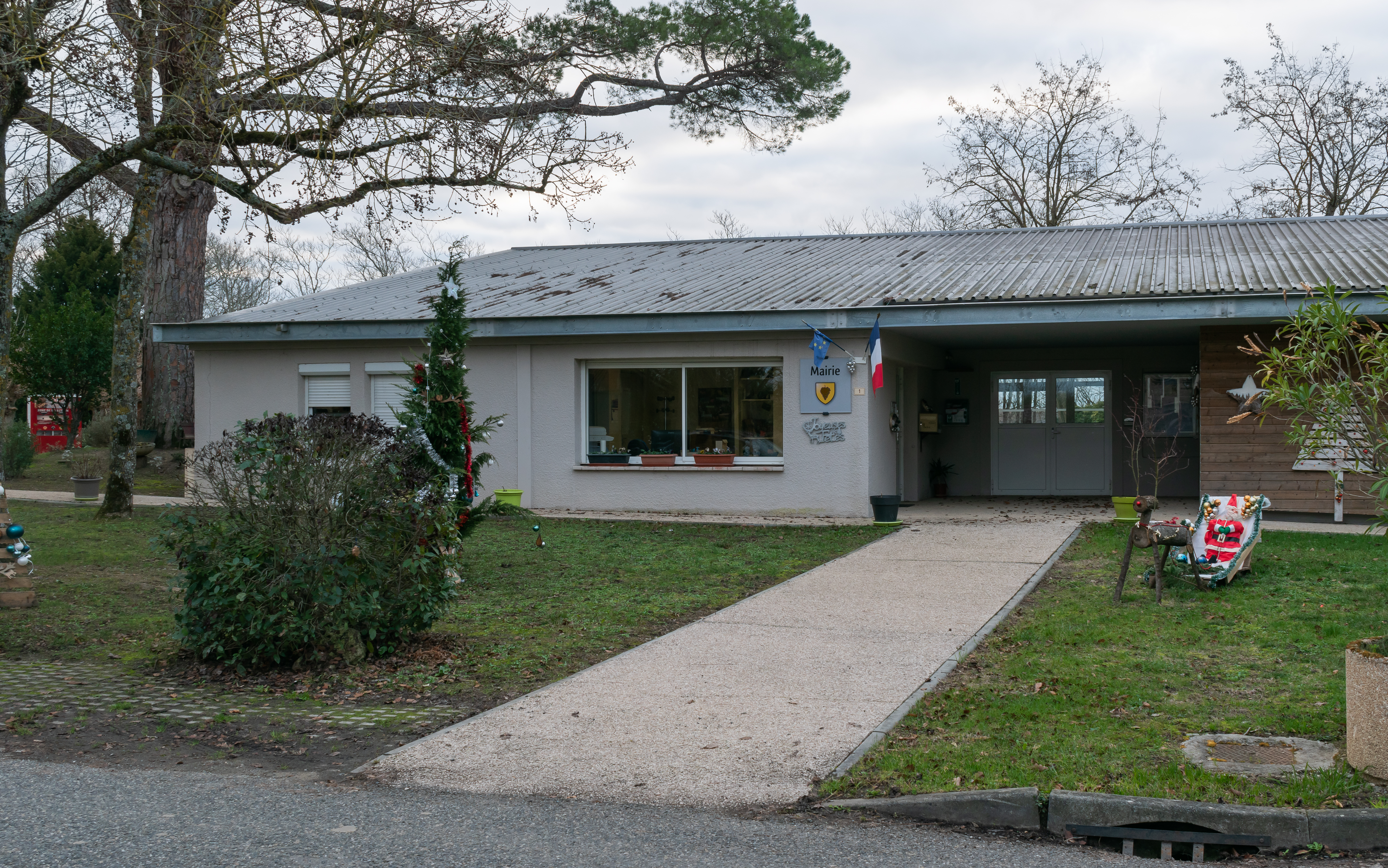

- Coat of arms
- Location of Maurens
- Location within France Location within Occitanie
- Coordinates: 43°35′46″N 0°55′02″E
- Country: France
- Region: Occitania
- Department: Gers
- Arrondissement: Auch
- Canton: Gimone-Arrats

Government
  - Mayor (2020–2026): Jean-Luc Boas
- Area^{1}: 13.03 km^{2} (5.03 sq mi)
- Elevation: 260 m (850 ft)
- Highest elevation: 256 m (840 ft)
- Lowest elevation: 166 m (545 ft)
- Population (2023): 304
  - Density: 23.3/km^{2} (60.4/sq mi)
- Time zone: UTC+01:00 (CET)
  - Summer (DST): UTC+02:00 (CEST)
- INSEE/Postal code: 32247 /32200
- ^{1} French Land Register data, which excludes lakes, ponds, glaciers > 1 km^{2} (0.386 sq mi or 247 acres) and river estuaries.

Maurens is a commune in the Gers department in southwestern France.

== Geography ==
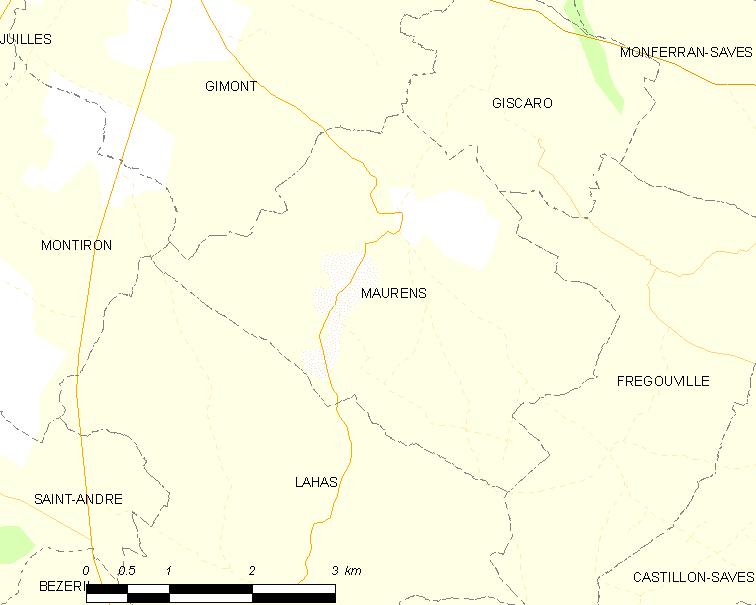
Maurens and its surrounding communes

== Population ==
Historical population
Year	Pop.	±% p.a.
1968	212	—
1975	221	+0.60%
1982	200	−1.42%
1990	177	−1.52%
1999	208	+1.81%
2007	293	+4.38%
2012	303	+0.67%
2017	311	+0.52%
2023	304	−0.38%
Source: INSEE

== See also ==
- Communes of the Gers department
