= Monfort =

- Commune
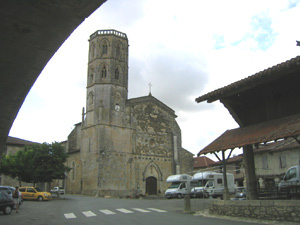
- The church in Monfort

- Coat of arms
- Location of Monfort
- Location within France Location within Occitanie
- Coordinates: 43°47′43″N 0°49′29″E
- Country: France
- Region: Occitania
- Department: Gers
- Arrondissement: Condom
- Canton: Gimone-Arrats

Government
  - Mayor (2020–2026): Régis Lagardere
- Area^{1}: 22.49 km^{2} (8.68 sq mi)
- Elevation: 164 m (538 ft)
- Highest elevation: 194 m (636 ft)
- Lowest elevation: 105 m (344 ft)
- Population (2023): 515
  - Density: 22.9/km^{2} (59.3/sq mi)
- Time zone: UTC+01:00 (CET)
  - Summer (DST): UTC+02:00 (CEST)
- INSEE/Postal code: 32269 /32120
- ^{1} French Land Register data, which excludes lakes, ponds, glaciers > 1 km^{2} (0.386 sq mi or 247 acres) and river estuaries.

Monfort (French pronunciation: [mɔ̃fɔʁ]; Occitan: Montfòrt) is a commune in the Gers department, in Occitanie region in southwestern France.

== Geography ==
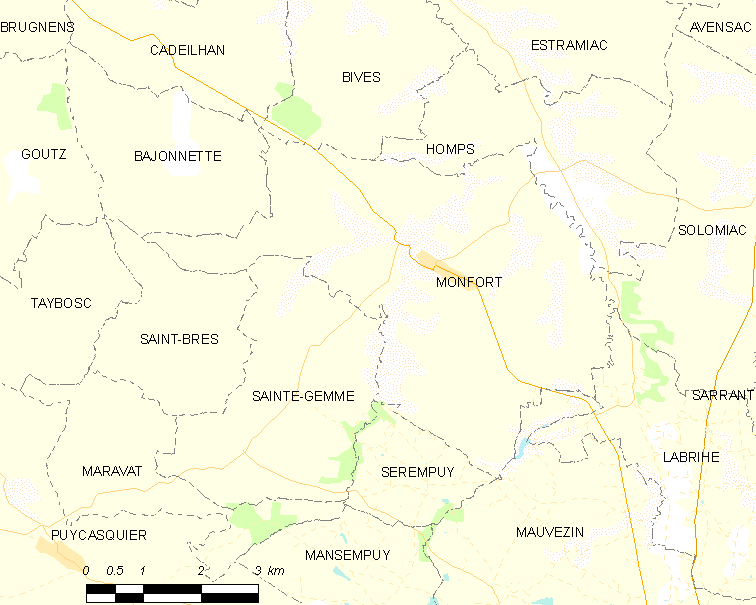
Monfort and its surrounding communes

== Population ==
Historical population
Year	Pop.	±% p.a.
1968	539	—
1975	495	−1.21%
1982	454	−1.23%
1990	416	−1.09%
1999	424	+0.21%
2007	474	+1.40%
2012	483	+0.38%
2017	492	+0.37%
2023	515	+0.76%
Source: INSEE

== See also ==
- Communes of the Gers department
