= Mauvezin, Gers =

Mauvezin
- Commune
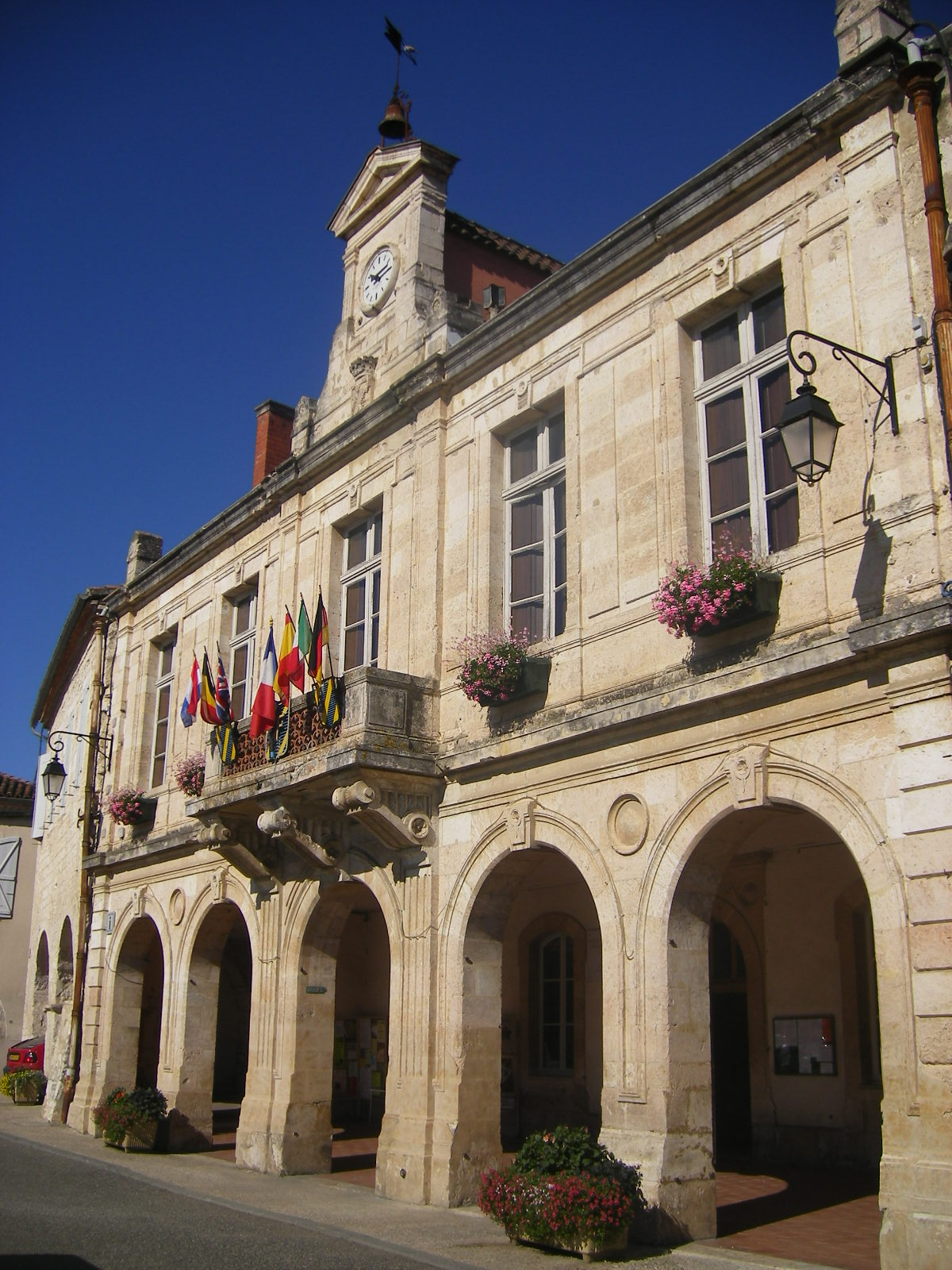
- Town hall

- Coat of arms
- Location of Mauvezin
- Location within France Location within Occitanie
- Coordinates: 43°43′53″N 0°52′44″E
- Country: France
- Region: Occitania
- Department: Gers
- Arrondissement: Condom
- Canton: Gimone-Arrats

Government
  - Mayor (2020–2026): Alain Baqué
- Area^{1}: 32.18 km^{2} (12.42 sq mi)
- Elevation: 158 m (518 ft)
- Highest elevation: 202 m (663 ft)
- Lowest elevation: 115 m (377 ft)
- Population (2023): 2,274
  - Density: 70.67/km^{2} (183.0/sq mi)
- Time zone: UTC+01:00 (CET)
  - Summer (DST): UTC+02:00 (CEST)
- INSEE/Postal code: 32249 /32120
- ^{1} French Land Register data, which excludes lakes, ponds, glaciers > 1 km^{2} (0.386 sq mi or 247 acres) and river estuaries.

Mauvezin (French pronunciation: [mov(ə)zɛ̃]; Occitan: Mauvesin) is a commune in the Gers department, in Occitanie region in southwestern France.

== Geography ==
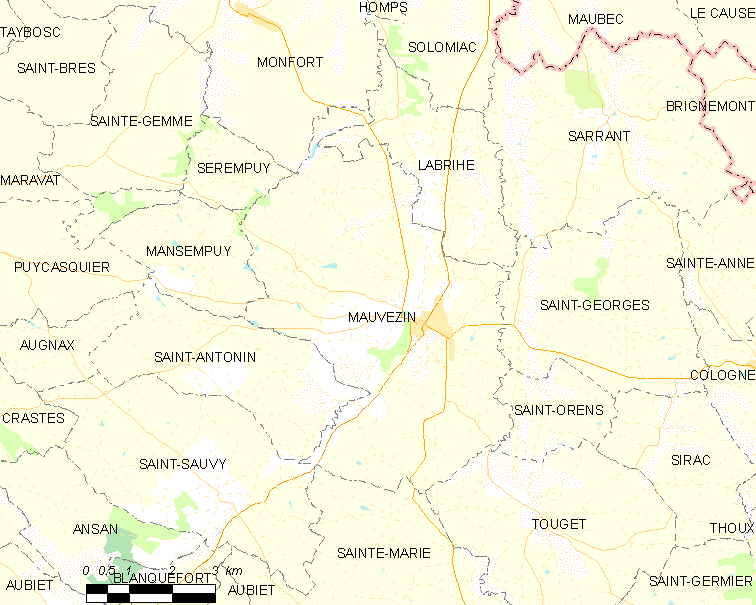
Mauvezin and its surrounding communes

== Population ==
Historical population
Year	Pop.	±% p.a.
1968	1,857	—
1975	1,756	−0.80%
1982	1,705	−0.42%
1990	1,671	−0.25%
1999	1,642	−0.19%
2007	1,804	+1.18%
2012	2,025	+2.34%
2017	2,179	+1.48%
2023	2,274	+0.71%
Source: INSEE

== See also ==
- Communes of the Gers department
