= Beaupuy, Gers =

Beaupuy
- Commune
- Coat of arms
- Location of Beaupuy
- Location within France Location within Occitanie
- Coordinates: 43°38′42″N 1°00′21″E
- Country: France
- Region: Occitania
- Department: Gers
- Arrondissement: Auch
- Canton: Gimone-Arrats
- Intercommunality: Gascogne Toulousaine

Government
  - Mayor (2020–2026): Frédéric Paquin
- Area^{1}: 6.54 km^{2} (2.53 sq mi)
- Elevation: 186 m (610 ft)
- Highest elevation: 229 m (751 ft)
- Lowest elevation: 156 m (512 ft)
- Population (2023): 210
  - Density: 32/km^{2} (83/sq mi)
- Time zone: UTC+01:00 (CET)
  - Summer (DST): UTC+02:00 (CEST)
- INSEE/Postal code: 32038 /32600
- ^{1} French Land Register data, which excludes lakes, ponds, glaciers > 1 km^{2} (0.386 sq mi or 247 acres) and river estuaries.

Beaupuy (French pronunciation: [bopɥi]; Occitan: Bèthpoi) is a commune in the Gers department in southwestern France.

== Geography ==
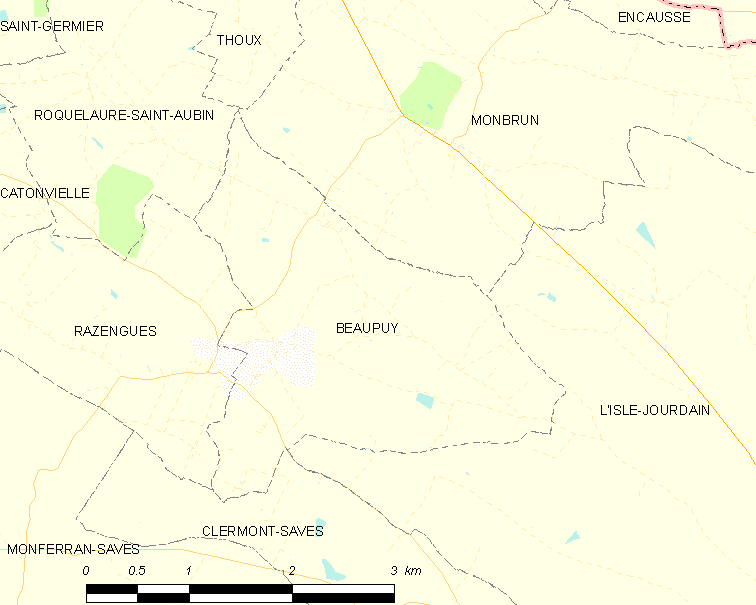
Beaupuy and its surrounding communes

== Population ==
Historical population
Year	Pop.	±% p.a.
1968	101	—
1975	91	−1.48%
1982	76	−2.54%
1990	79	+0.49%
1999	104	+3.10%
2007	168	+6.18%
2012	195	+3.03%
2017	188	−0.73%
2023	210	+1.86%
Source: INSEE

== See also ==
- Communes of the Gers department
