= Estang =

- Commune
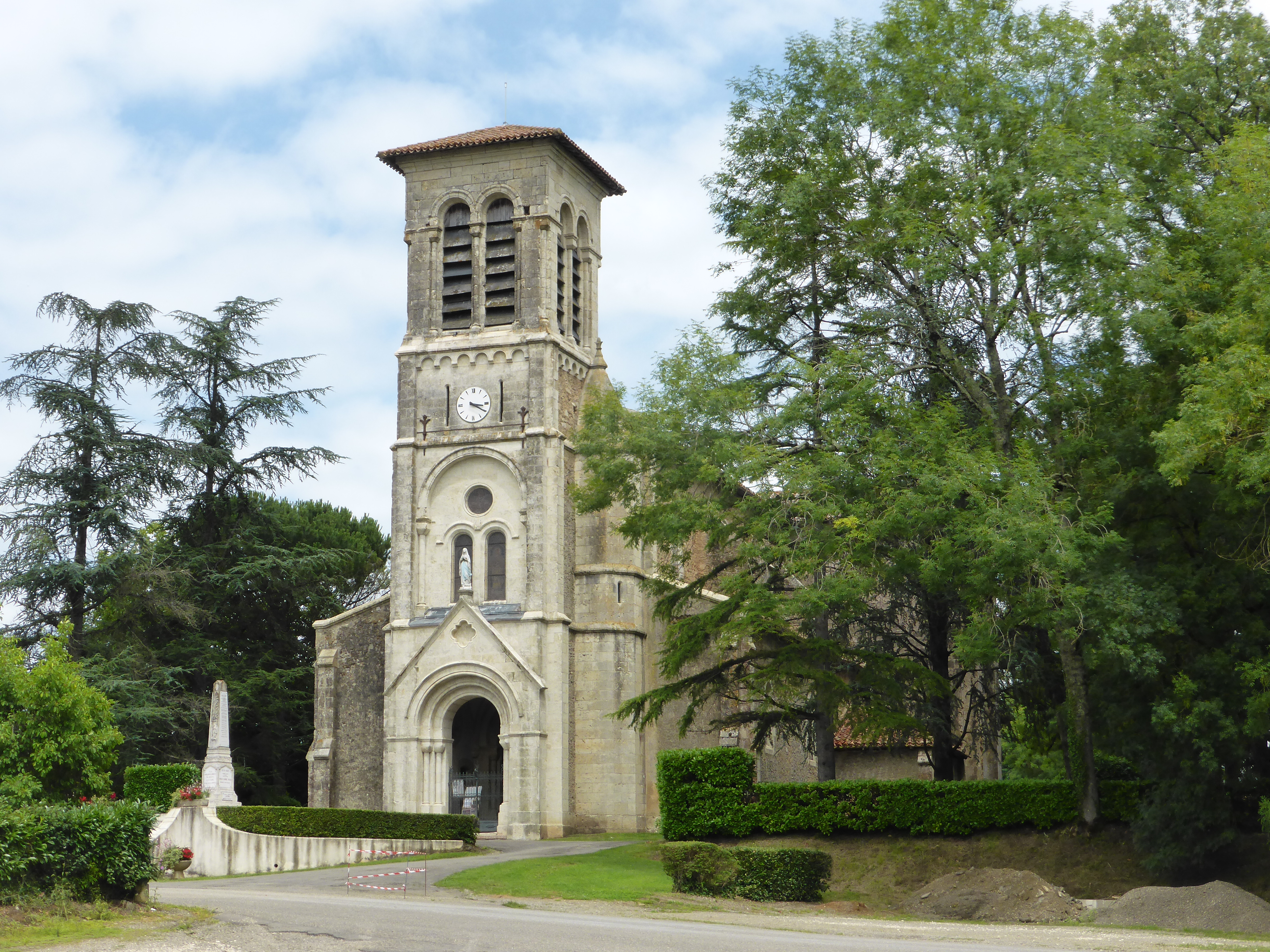
- The church in Estang

- Coat of arms
- Location of Estang
- Location within France Location within Occitanie
- Coordinates: 43°52′03″N 0°06′27″W
- Country: France
- Region: Occitania
- Department: Gers
- Arrondissement: Condom
- Canton: Grand-Bas-Armagnac
- Intercommunality: Grand-Armagnac

Government
  - Mayor (2020–2026): Christophe Rande
- Area^{1}: 22.51 km^{2} (8.69 sq mi)
- Elevation: 90 m (300 ft)
- Highest elevation: 157 m (515 ft)
- Lowest elevation: 82 m (269 ft)
- Population (2023): 668
  - Density: 29.7/km^{2} (76.9/sq mi)
- Time zone: UTC+01:00 (CET)
  - Summer (DST): UTC+02:00 (CEST)
- INSEE/Postal code: 32127 /32240
- ^{1} French Land Register data, which excludes lakes, ponds, glaciers > 1 km^{2} (0.386 sq mi or 247 acres) and river estuaries.

Estang (French pronunciation: [ɛstɑ̃]; Occitan: Estanc) is a commune in the Gers department in southwestern France. Historically and culturally, the commune is in Bas-Armagnac, or black Armagnac, a region situated between the valleys of the Auzoue, the Gélise the Douze and the Midou.

Exposed to a modified oceanic climate, it is drained by the Loumné, the Estang, the Canal du Moulin, and several other small streams. The town boasts a remarkable natural heritage: a Natura 2000 site (the "Midou and Ludon hydrographic network") and four natural areas of ecological, faunal, and floral interest.

Estang is a rural town with 664 inhabitants in 2022, having reached a peak population of 1,426 in 1861. Its inhabitants are called Estanguois or Estanguoises.

The town's architectural heritage includes two buildings listed as historical monuments: the Jean Bartherotte bullring, listed in 1993, and the Notre-Dame church, listed in 1998.

== Geography ==
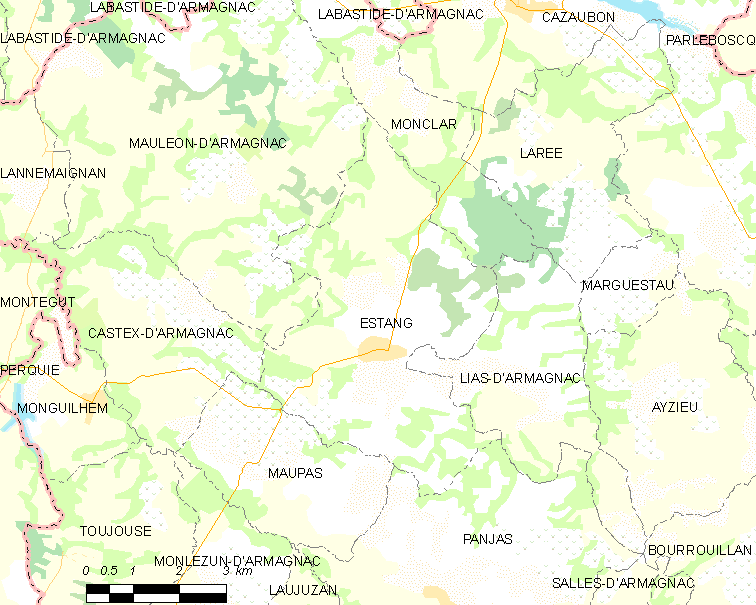
Estang and its surrounding communes

=== Location ===
Estang is a commune located in the northwest of the Gers department, a short distance from the Greenwich Meridian, in the heart of the ancient Roman province of Gaul, Novempopulania, whose capital was the ancient city of Elusa (Eauze). It lies within the Bas-Armagnac region, an area renowned for producing the brandies of this appellation. The surrounding forests lend the landscape a dark hue, which has earned it the name "Black Armagnac."

=== Neighboring communes ===
The neighbouring communes are Castex-d'Armagnac, Lias-d'Armagnac, Mauléon-d'Armagnac, Maupas, Monclar and Panjas.

=== Geology and relief ===
In the northwestern part of the Gers department, where Estang is located, and also in a portion of the eastern Landes department, the ocean left marine deposits during the Middle Miocene period known as "tawny sands." These sands contribute to the specific quality of the Armagnac produced in Bas-Armagnac. The sea has also left its mark in stones where fossilized pectens, among other things, are found. In the past, several sand quarries were in operation in the area, where such large, naturally decorated stones could sometimes be extracted. Estang is situated in a landscape that alternates between hillsides, wooded hills, and Armagnac vineyards.

=== Hydrography ===
The town is crossed by a stream (the Arbout) which divides the village into two hamlets. It originates at a place called "La Houn Sante" (the Holy Fountain). This abundant spring is now tapped and provides drinking water to about ten surrounding villages.

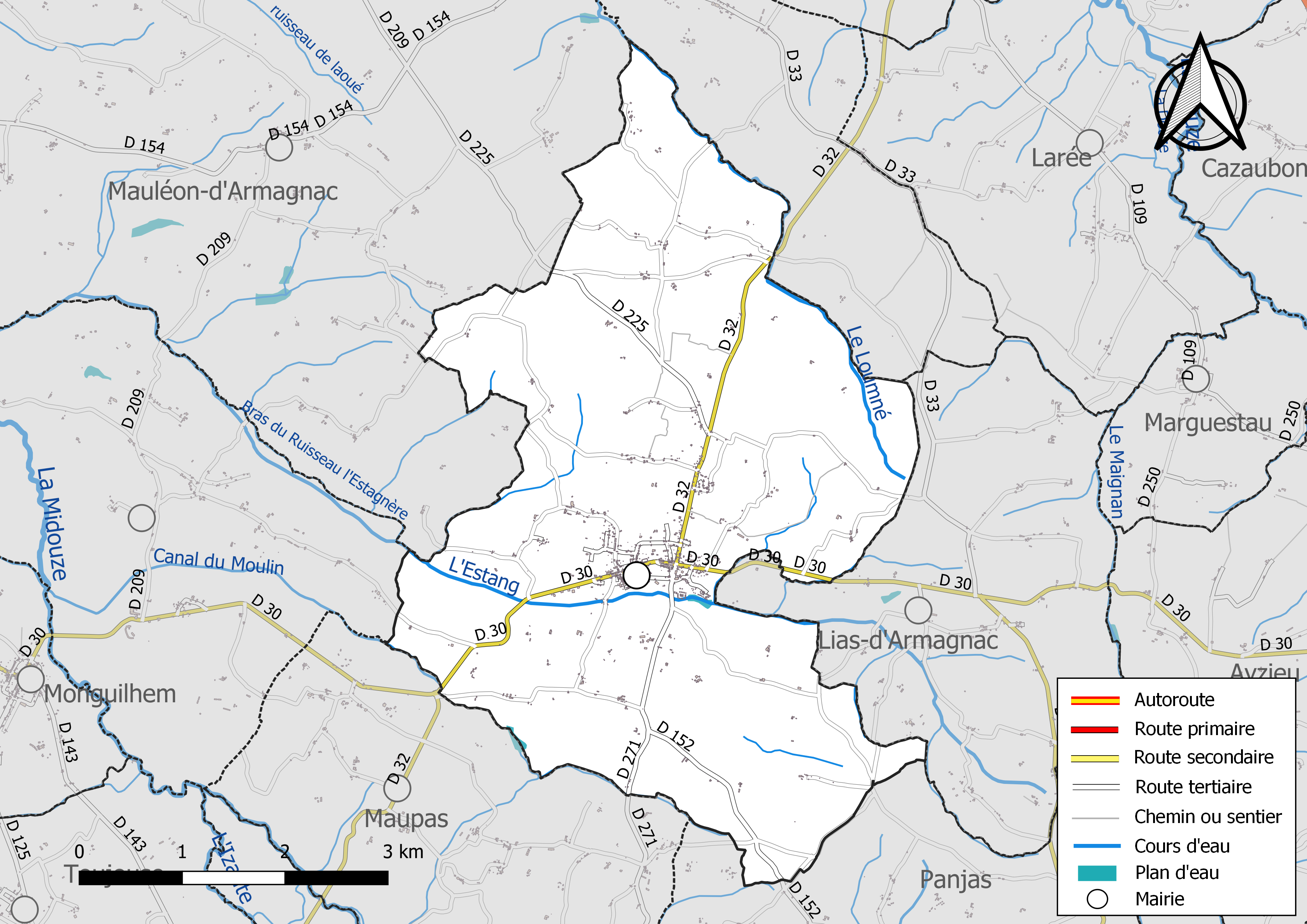
Hydrographic and road networks of Estang.

L'Estang, a small stream with shaded banks thanks to limited riparian vegetation at its base, runs alongside the village. It rises in Lias-d'Armagnac and is a tributary of the Midour River. Its clarity is ideal for salmonids, a valuable fishing resource that has allowed part of its course to be classified as a first-category fishing area. Within the commune, its clear waters once powered the paddles of two mills (Lartigole and Ayrenx, the latter skillfully restored by its new owner). A third mill, now in ruins (Notre Dame), was fed by the Arbout stream, which springs from the Houn Sante. To the north flows the Douze River, which from the Middle Ages until the French Revolution separated the dioceses of Auch and Aire. Thus, the parish of Estang fell under the jurisdiction of the archpriestship of Mauléon, itself part of the diocese of Aire. To the south flows the Midour River. In bygone days, to travel from Estang to Le Houga, one had to cross this stream at Monguilhem and continue via Toujouse. The Cassini map shows this single route (the direct route, via Monlezun-d'Armagnac, is a later addition).

The Loumné, a left tributary of the Douze, rises within the commune.

=== Climate ===
Several studies have been conducted to characterize the climatic types to which the national territory is exposed. The resulting zoning varies depending on the methods used, the nature and number of parameters considered, the territorial coverage of the data, and the reference period. In 2010, the commune's climate was classified as an altered oceanic climate, according to a study by the French National Centre for Scientific Research (CNRS) based on a method combining climatic data and environmental factors (topography, land use, etc.) and data covering the period 1971-2000. In 2020, the predominant climate was classified as Cfb, according to the Köppen-Geiger classification, for the period 1988-2017, namely a temperate climate with cool summers and no dry season. Furthermore, in 2020, Météo-France published a new typology of the climates of metropolitan France, in which the commune is exposed to a modified oceanic climate and is located in the Aquitaine-Gascogne climatic region, characterized by abundant rainfall in spring, moderate rainfall in autumn, low sunshine in spring, hot summers (19.5 °C), weak winds, frequent fog in autumn and winter, and frequent thunderstorms in summer (15 to 20 days). It is also located in zone H2c under the 2020 environmental regulations for new construction.

For the period 1971-2000, the average annual temperature was 12.9 °C, with an annual temperature range of 14.6 °C. The average annual rainfall was 942 mm, with 11.4 days of precipitation in January and 6.7 days in July. For the period 1991-2020, the average annual temperature observed at the nearest Météo-France weather station, located in the commune of Le Houga 12 km away as the crow flies, was 13.8 °C, and the average annual rainfall was 875.9 mm. The maximum temperature recorded at this station was 41.1 °C, reached on 18 June 2022; the minimum temperature was -12.4 °C, reached on 27 January 2007.

=== Natural environments and biodiversity ===
==== Natura 2000 Network ====
The Natura 2000 network is a European ecological network of natural sites of ecological interest, developed under the Habitats and Birds Directives, and consisting of Special Areas of Conservation (SACs) and Special Protection Areas (SPAs). A Natura 2000 site has been designated within the municipality under the Habitats Directive: the "Midou and Ludon river system," covering an area of 6,542 hectares, a site exhibiting a relatively significant diversity of habitats, despite a low representation of habitats of Community interest.

==== Natural areas of ecological, faunal and floral interest ====
The inventory of natural areas of ecological, faunal, and floral interest (ZNIEFF) aims to cover the most ecologically significant areas, primarily to improve knowledge of the national natural heritage and provide decision-makers with a tool to help them integrate environmental considerations into land-use planning. Two type 1 ZNIEFFs are identified within the municipality: the "woods and heaths of La Clotte, La Tauziole, and Labadie" (792 ha), covering four municipalities in the department, and the "Lauron pond and woods" (22 ha), covering three communes in the department. Two type 2 ZNIEFFs are also identified:

- "La Douze and related habitats" (11,575 ha), covering 29 communes, 26 of which are in the Gers department and three in the Landes department;
- the "Midou hydrographic network and associated environments" (6,344 ha), covering 43 communes, including 37 in Gers and six in Landes.
Map

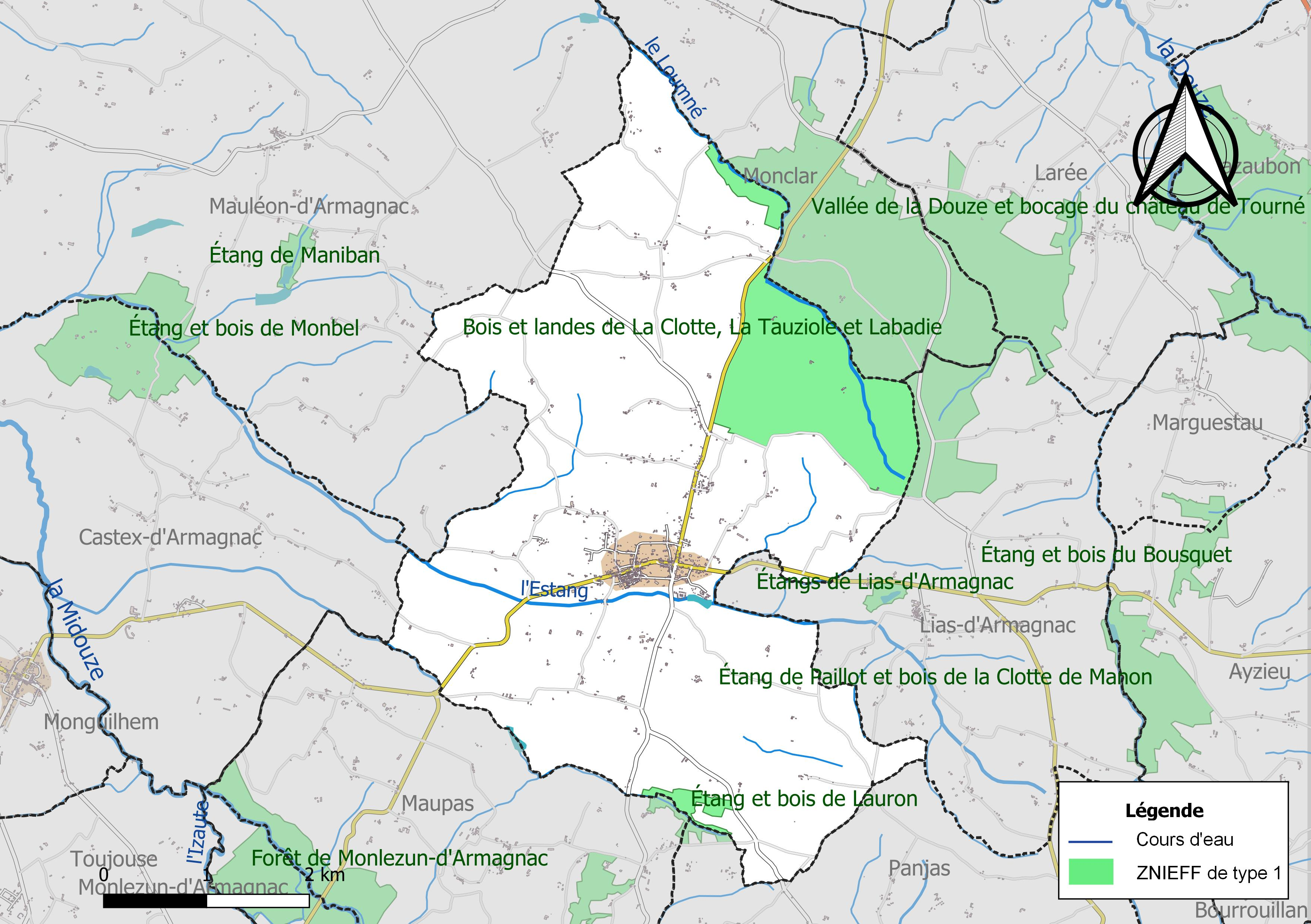
Map of type 1 ZNIEFFs in the commune

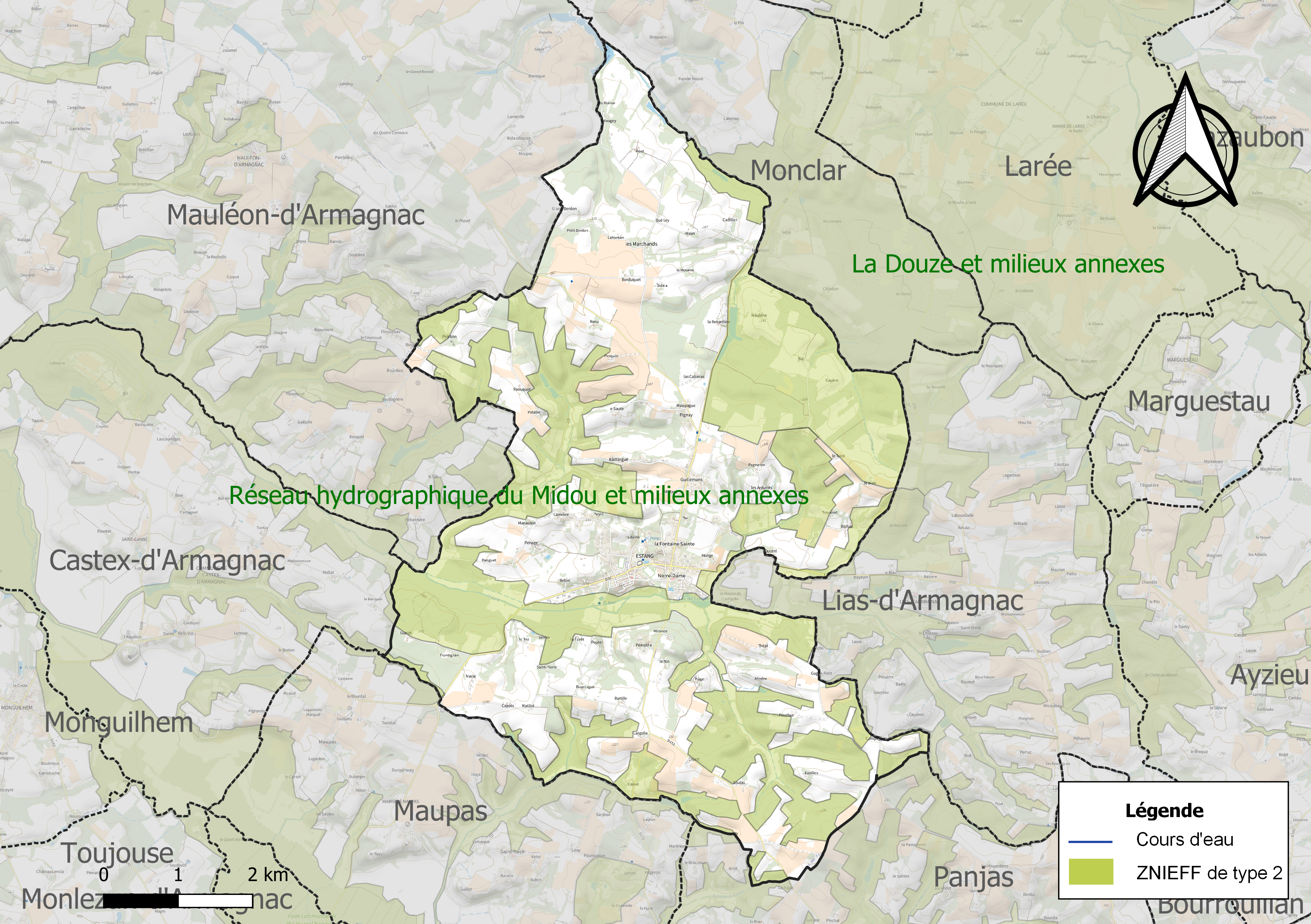
Map of type 2 ZNIEFFs in the commune

== Urban planning ==
=== Typology ===
As of 1 January 2024, Estang is categorized as a rural commune with dispersed housing, according to the new seven-level municipal density grid defined by INSEE in 2022. It is located outside urban units and outside the influence of cities.

=== Land use ===
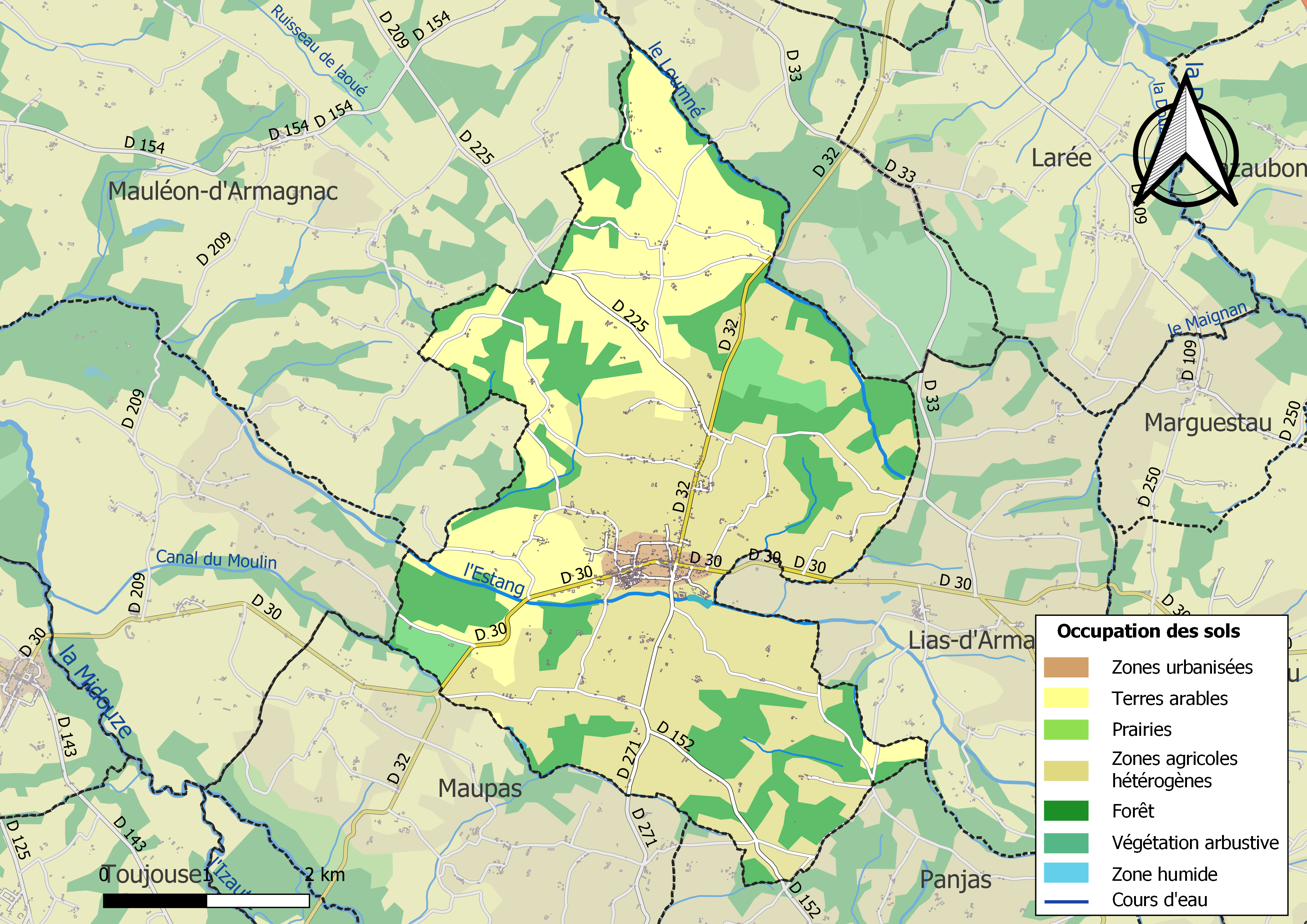
Map of infrastrucutre and land use in Estang

Land cover in the commune, as shown in the European biophysical land cover database Corine Land Cover (CLC), is characterized by a significant amount of agricultural land (69.8% in 2018), a decrease compared to 1990 (71.2%). The detailed breakdown in 2018 is as follows: heterogeneous agricultural areas (38.1%), forests (24.9%), arable land (16.1%), permanent crops (15.7%), areas with shrub and/or herbaceous vegetation (2.7%), and urbanized areas (2.6%). Changes in land cover and infrastructure within the commune can be observed on various maps of the territory: the Cassini map (18th century), the General Staff map (1820-1866), and IGN maps and aerial photographs for the current period (1950 to the present).

=== Communication routes and transport ===
On its outskirts, the two roads connecting Auch to Mont-de-Marsan (via Eauze) and Cazaubon to Aire-sur-l'Adour converge. The town of Aire-sur-l'Adour is 25 km away, and the canton's main town, Cazaubon, is 9 km away. Mont-de-Marsan, the capital of the Landes department, is the main center of attraction.

The Compagnie du Midi railway company refused to route the railway line (Agen/Mont-de-Marsan via Port-Sainte-Marie and Nérac) through Estang rather than Labastide-d'Armagnac. Estang is therefore a village without a train station, a service provided by bus (the map of the departmental bus network subsidized in 1929 by the Gers General Council lists Estang as one of the stops). Gers is an important department for pilgrims on the Way of St. James (Camino de Santiago), and the Via Podiensis (the Le Puy route) passes four leagues from Estang, bypassing it to the south.

=== Major risks ===
The territory of the commune of Estang is vulnerable to various natural hazards: weather-related (storms, thunderstorms, snow, extreme cold, heat waves, or drought) and earthquakes (very low seismicity). A website published by the BRGM allows for a simple and quick assessment of the risks to a property located either by its address or by its plot number.

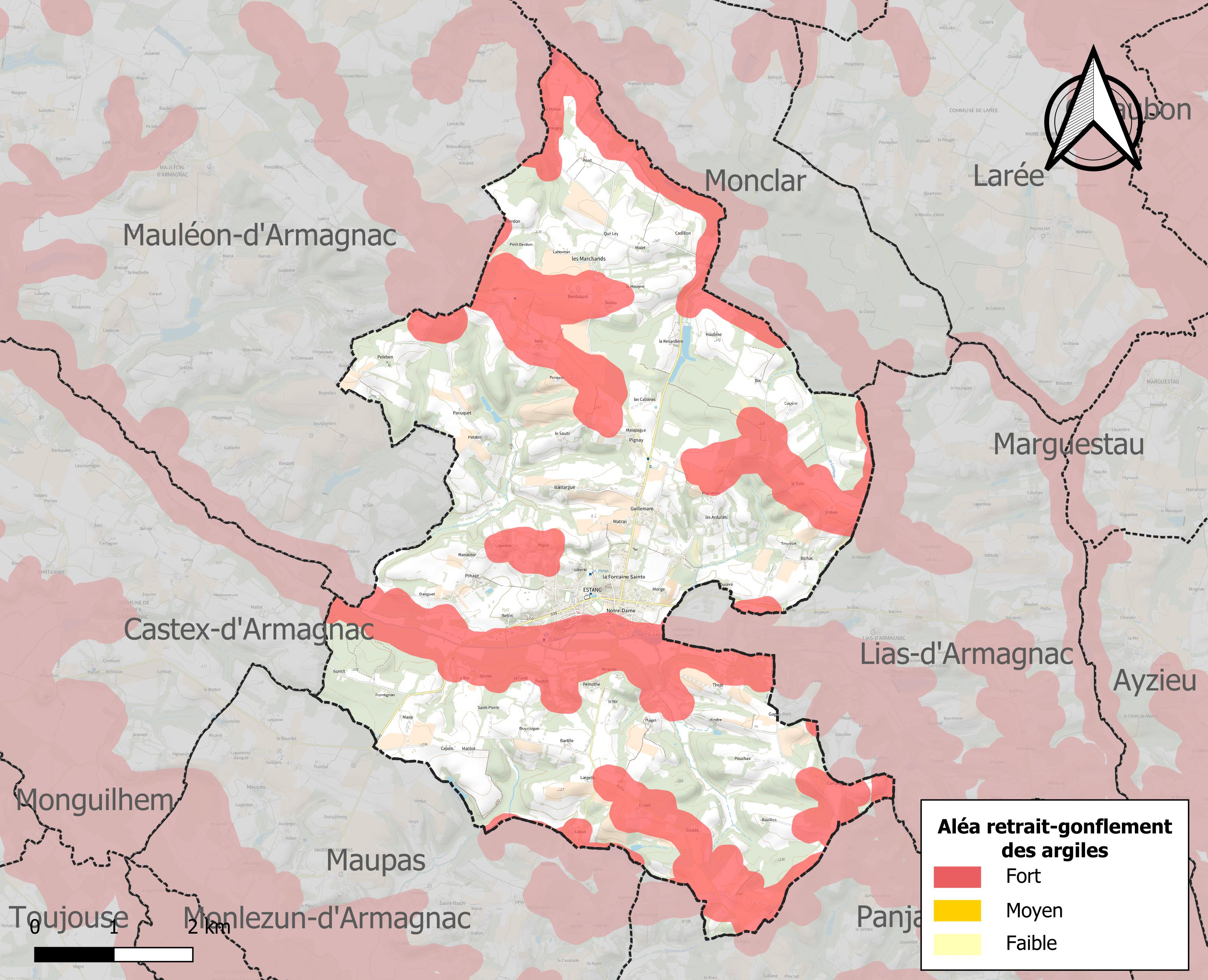
Map of the shrink-swell hazard zones of clay soils in Estang.

The shrinkage and swelling of clay soils can cause significant damage to buildings in the event of alternating periods of drought and rain. 30.9% of the commune's area is at medium or high risk (94.5% at the departmental level and 48.5% at the national level). Of the 461 buildings counted in the municipality in 2019, 132 are at medium or high risk, representing 29%, compared to 93% at the departmental level and 54% at the national level. A map of the national territory's exposure to clay soil shrinkage and swelling is available on the BRGM website.

Furthermore, to better understand the risk of ground subsidence, the national inventory of underground cavities allows for the identification of those located within the commune.

The commune has been declared a natural disaster area due to damage caused by floods and mudslides in 1985, 1997, 1999, 2003, and 2009. Regarding landslides, the commune has been declared a natural disaster area due to damage caused by drought in 1989, 2002, and 2017, and by landslides in 1999.

Estang is located in seismic zone 1 (very low seismicity).

== Name ==
The Latin word stagnum (stagnant water) could be the etymological basis for the village's name: the waters of the Houn Sante made the area on either side of the village (currently partly occupied by the football field) marshy. However, another plausible origin is the alteration of the word "estanquet'", referring to the rest stop that the Haget Abbey provided for pilgrims traveling to Santiago de Compostela. In the 19th century, major earthworks initiated by Mayor Paul Dubédat made it possible to cross this marsh, creating a beautiful vista from Place Saint-Martial to Notre-Dame, which is called Avenue Saint-Martial in reference to the old church.

== History ==
=== Prehistory ===
The prehistory of Estang is limited to evidence of human occupation. A polished stone axe was discovered near some bones (including a sizable mammal jawbone). The find was made at an old quarry (now filled in) located in the area known as liberté. Does this suggest the presence of a camp in a rock shelter within the future quarry. This camp was subsequently buried by the eluvium of tawny sand.

Before the Roman period, Armagnac was divided among three tribes: the Elusates (Eauze), the Sotiates (Sos), and the Tarusates (Tursan - Aire). Extending into the far west of the department, the Tarusates (people of the Adour and Tursan valleys) encompassed nine communes in the canton of Cazaubon, including Estang, within their territory.

During the Roman period, it can be assumed that the Elusates who founded Eauze certainly controlled the commune, given that some place names have retained a certain Roman ancestry.

=== Middle Ages ===
Around 1075, a "castrum" is mentioned to designate the village. However, the polysemy of this term, meaning both the enclosure of a village and a lordly fortress, complicates research. Moreover, the somewhat isolated location of the Notre-Dame church might suggest an initial settlement nearby. It is possible that this was an ecclesiastical village that expanded towards the promontory overlooking the Estang stream, the site of Castel Vielh (near the Notre-Dame church, likely with its monastery). The nearby Monge would have housed a small community. Was it used to receive the tithe? A document from 1270 attests that by that date, the Estang church had been open for worship for 80 years, that is, since 1190. This church was then the monastery church, located to the east of the hill (occupied by the current town – the upper town). It therefore appears to have been built on the Gallo-Roman settlement of Courtes.

In the 13th century, the Castelnau (today partly the "upper town") was built, with its typical linear structure, perched on its castle mound, with its Saint-Martial church, its castle, its straight streets, its fortified enclosure, its moats, preceded at its highest point by a tower that dominated and protected it. The feudal mound is still visible, and place names such as "la tour" (the tower), "rue des fossés" (street of the moats), and "embarrats" (the moats) preserve the memory of centuries past. The origin lies in the phenomenon of "enchâtellement" (the fortification of rural settlements) in Gascony, Gers, as in southern France. It is for this reason that Estang is listed in the category of castelnaus, that is to say, settlements established at the foot of a castle, most often themselves enclosed within a wall. To protect Estang by watching for the enemy, outposts were established at Frontignan, Pémothe, and Le Haget. Le Tuco, a very old word meaning eminence, was located on a second line of surveillance. Previously, to the east of the fortified village, certainly in the immediate vicinity of the Notre-Dame church, stood a castle. It was mentioned as early as the 11th century and has completely disappeared.

Outside the town walls, at the foot of what must have been the original enclosure, a district called Les Embarrats developed, served by a single sloping alleyway. In Gascon, embarrat means enclosure. Perhaps this was the first suburb of Estang. Those who suffered from popular racism, in this case the Cagots (called capots in Armagnac), lived in the Capots district (near the old church of Saint-Pierre). This was a form of hereditary and vernacular socio-economic segregation (particularly prevalent in Gascony). For their part, the landed bourgeoisie resided mainly on the main street, now called the "Grande Rue," lined with a few elegant houses. Other distinctive houses are scattered throughout the village; these "townhouses" often belonged to owners of farms in the surrounding countryside. Before the 17th century, the use of stone in house construction was not widespread. This noble material was used only for castles and churches, but also for some houses belonging to the bourgeoisie or religious communities. Most urban dwellings were half-timbered, that is, made of wattle and daub or bricks over a wooden frame. Thus, many houses in the village and almost all the farms had wattle and daub walls, supported by beams and whitewashed. The main street was lined, on its north side and for a short length, with arcades. These were demolished in the 1960s to give the street a more acceptable width. Otherwise, the town has retained virtually nothing of its medieval past.

Since the Treaty of Brétigny (8 May 1360), Estang has been part of the province of Aquitaine, west of the dividing line between English possessions and the County of Armagnac, which belonged to the French crown. The boundary between the two territories runs from Bretagne d'Armagnac to Campagne d'Armagnac, Manciet, Cazaux d'Angles, Castelnau d'Angles, and finally to the Adour River. Estang is therefore only eight kilometers from this point.

In 1309, E.N. Seguin, Baron of Estang, was punished by the confiscation of all the lands he possessed in the diocese of Aire. Edward II of England drafted this decree during his visit to Bazas to punish the lord accused of "burdening towns and monasteries with taxes and requisitions," including Estang, which was then experiencing a period of great hardship.

The lands of Estang were detached in 1368 by Charles V in favor of John I of Armagnac. In 1432, he granted them to Manaut de Lau, Baron, Count of Estang, and Marquis of Lusignan, in exchange for Espas and 1,500 écus. In 1452, all of Aquitaine and Gascony broke free from English rule. Through a series of alliances, Estang passed to the Esparbès family, an illustrious family whose coat of arms adorns the painted funeral frieze in the church.

The clash of arms did not spare the village. It is known that Arnauld Guillem d'Armagnac governed the towns of Marquestau, Monclar, and Labatisde for the King of France, and the King of England, already master of Lias, had just founded new towns intended, along with Estang, to support his claims to Gascony. It was thus that Arnauld Guillem seized Estang, likely after the founding of Monguilhem. The Count of Armagnac, Jean, intervened, and peace between the warring parties was signed in 1322.

The Hundred Years' War saw the destructive passage of the Black Prince, and we have a historical record of this thanks to the Memoirs of John Le Baker: "On October 13, 1355, we were quartered in the town of Monclar, whose castle surrendered. That same day, three towns were taken and burned. Sir John Lisle was wounded by an arrow during the capture of the fort of Estang." A trace of this battle remains in the form of stone cannonballs discovered by private individuals; these relics deserve to be included in the town's heritage so that they can be preserved for the benefit of local history enthusiasts. Panjas and Nogaro suffered the same fate as Estang.

=== Renaissance ===
The Reformation was very well received in the Kingdom of Navarre, and Jeanne d'Albret, following in the footsteps of Marguerite de Navarre, offered her unwavering support to the Huguenots. Reformed worship had taken root in all of Queen Jeanne's residences: Nérac, Mont-de-Marsan, Hagetmau, and Pau. Most of the nobles at her court had embraced the Reformation. However, in the neighboring territories under the rule of the King of France, the majority of the Gascon nobility remained Catholic, although a division had arisen within some prominent families, with one faction faithfully adhering to the faith of the King of France and the other to that of the court of Navarre.

This conflict would plunge the country into chaos and bloodshed. On 15 July 1572, Protestant troops, under the command of the young military leader Gabriel I de Montgomery, ravaged the Church of Notre-Dame. In the choir, the mutilated sculptures bear witness to the iconoclastic fury of the combatants. The Church of Saint-Martial, an annex of the parish church of Notre-Dame, was pillaged and ransacked. Located near the current town hall (almost adjoining it), it was razed at the beginning of the 20th century.

The churches of Saint-Barthélémy and Saint-Pierre suffered the same fate. The site of Saint-Pierre and its leper colony in the Capots district is still known. However, the history of Saint-Barthélémy is less certain. Following an inquiry ordered by Charles IX, it was established that: "...the people of the Reformed religion had massacred 79 priests in the diocese of Aire alone." Furthermore, they had pillaged and even destroyed, in whole or in part, 220 churches. As for the parish church of Estang and its annexes... the ornaments, jewels, books, and bells were taken, stolen, pillaged, and carried off, and the said churches were burned and ruined...

The passage of Henry IV through the region accelerated the reconstruction of Notre-Dame. He stayed, it is said, at the fortified house of La Hirle.

=== French Revolution ===
In 1770, Marie Françoise Bouchard d'Esparbès, Baroness and Countess, sold Estang to the Chevalier Pierre de Bastard (known as the Bastard of Estang). The Forêt estate, as well as a house on the main street, are said to have belonged to him. Before and after the Revolution, lengthy lawsuits pitted him against the inhabitants of Estang concerning the "vacants," vast open spaces where the villagers' flocks could roam freely, which he sought to confiscate for himself. In 1791, Estang became the chief town of the canton. For some years already, a liqueur factory had been thriving at a place called La Brûlerie.

During the Revolution, Estang was the chief town of the canton in the district of Nogaro. A small town of 1,400 inhabitants, it was the most populated in the canton. A simmering conflict with the local lord became open, and: "Monsieur Bastard was forced to keep his residence hidden to avoid the revolutionary axe." The constitutional priest, Olivier Baylen, was installed in Estang, and the refractory priest and his vicar, Lacomme, sought to incite the population against him. Taking advantage of this unrest and the interpretation of the decrees, the inhabitants of Estang revived their claims to ownership of the Pesqué marsh.

=== 19th century ===
Driven out of France by Joan of Arc and La Hire's Gascons, the English would once again enter the country 400 years later, this time through Gascony. Consequently, the Duke of Wellington and the English armada made a deadly passage through Estang in 1814. Soult attempted to resist in vain during the Battle of Aire-sur-l'Adour. Eauze would be bombarded.

The announcement of Napoleon III's coup d'état stirred reactions in the town. However, the demonstrations of the opponents had little effect, if we are to believe this comment: Four "red" ringleaders ventured to walk the streets singing republican songs: the carpenter-barber Cheyres; the former tax collector Baylin; Paul-Emile Dussans, a penniless lawyer; and the blacksmith Dambés. He spoke only of slitting the throats of the rich, the gentlemen, and throwing them into the town well.

The current post office was occupied until 1905 by the parish priest as the rectory. Before the separation of Church and State, the post office was located in a building on the "little street," near the small square connecting this street to the "main street." This square once had a market hall. This house later became the rectory when several families bought it to house a priest and thus fill the vacancy due to the lack of a residence. In fact, it was a relocation (the post office now occupied the former rectory and the priest the former post office).

=== 20th century ===
The two World Wars took a heavy human toll on the village. The First World War claimed the lives of twenty percent of the men of conscription age. The names of the 58 victims are engraved on the commemorative stele at the war memorial. As for the Second World War, Estang was the scene of fierce fighting on 3 July 1944, the same day that one of the last deportation trains, the infamous "ghost train," departed Toulouse for Dachau. The Indochina and Algerian Wars each claimed one victim.

==== Events of 3 July 1944 ====
Parisot, founder and leader of the Armagnac Battalion, learned that Germans from Mont-de-Marsan had occupied the post office in Cazaubon and the Jewish reception center in Bégué (this was one of the Christian friendship centers, run by Father Glasberg, which allowed people wanted by the Nazis to be escorted to the Spanish border. A large number of foreign refugees would pass through it). Then it was reported that four German trucks had entered Cazaubon. This followed an alert sent by militiamen and other collaborators to the Feldgendarmerie.

Eight residents were arrested, and based on the information provided by the same individuals: "...Major Obermann, commanding the two companies... to go towards Maupas and the reported terrorist camp, passing through Estang" (Jewish Families in the Gers - 1939-1945). Parisot then decided to carry out an attack. In fact, near the village of Estang, he unexpectedly stumbled upon a column of forty trucks. The young recruits of the battalion put up fierce resistance against better-armed and trained soldiers. It took the Germans more than four hours to reach Estang, while the resistance fighters retreated, leaving one of their own dead and one prisoner.

The Germans searched the houses and set several on fire, then took twenty hostages from among the population. Eight of them were executed, as well as the captured resistance fighter (application of the law of retaliation, given that the Germans suffered nine dead and 27 wounded). The selection of the eight people does not appear to have been the result of a lottery but most likely the product of pre-existing records of the population or even denunciations (the German officer, who spoke fluent French, was accompanied by a Frenchman who interrogated several civilians being held at the crossroads). After the burst of gunfire, and before the platoon passed by them again, the officer addressed the civilians guarded at the Pinay crossroads: "Your partisans attacked my column, even though we came without any intention of fighting... We have 9 killed and many wounded. Uncover yourselves before your dead, for your comrades are being shot in reprisal... This is war, and it is as unfortunate for you as it is for us."

A monument was erected on the spot where the nine hostages were shot and inaugurated on 3 July 1948. A local street name (Rue du 3-Juillet-1944) also commemorates this event.

In addition to the hostages, this battle resulted in two civilian casualties. The Armagnac battalion lost two resistance fighters during the fighting. Deportation also reached the village, and four of its inhabitants were innocent victims. One woman was interned at Buchenwald in 1944-1945, and three gendarmes from the brigade were sent to Dachau. Two of them died during this deportation; a plaque affixed to the former gendarmerie barracks building bears witness to this.

== Services and society ==
=== Education ===
Since the National Convention, a secular, free, and fee-paying school had existed, but the schoolmaster displayed a real lack of skills and teaching ability.

To comply with the Guizot Law of 1833, which mandated the opening of a boys' school in all towns with more than 500 inhabitants, Estang had its own in 1834. It was located above the market hall (demolished around 1883) on the Place des Tilleuls (now Place Francis Jammes). The building was in poor condition, and the students were crammed into overcrowded spaces. Its first teacher was Jean Lafontan, originally from Le Houga, who took the following oath: "I swear allegiance to the King of the French, obedience to the Constitutional Charter and the laws of the kingdom."

=== Cultural events and festivities ===
Estang has had its own brass band since the 19th century: the "Renaissance d'Estang." This musical society was founded in 1893. Invited to the Algiers competition in 1901, it achieved considerable success. Since then, it has never ceased to exist. It has thus ensured Estang and the surrounding towns a presence at all ceremonies and whenever its participation has been requested. Having thrived throughout the 20th century, it continues into the 21st century.

=== Sports ===
Estang had a rugby team before switching to football in the 1930s. In 1941, the Union Sportive d'Estang was founded, also bringing together young footballers from the surrounding villages. Initially affiliated with the Landes district, it established itself in the Gers district and won five titles in 1968. It still trains young players and structures the Bas-Armagnac Football Association. The Landes-style bullfighting is older: it is part of the annual program of the village's patron saint festival.

== Economy ==
=== Income ===
In 2018 (Insee data published in September 2021), the commune had 323 tax households, comprising 589 people. The median disposable income per consumption unit was €18,250 (€20,820 in the department).

=== Employment ===
In 2018, the population aged 15 to 64 was 333, of whom 76.7% were in the labor force (67.3% employed and 9.3% unemployed) and 23.3% were not in the labor force. Since 2008, the municipal unemployment rate (as defined by the census) for those aged 15–64 has been higher than the departmental rate but lower than the national rate.

The commune is outside the catchment area of any city. It had 129 jobs in 2018, compared to 145 in 2013 and 179 in 2008. The number of employed residents in the commune was 232, representing an employment concentration of 55.7% and an activity rate among those aged 15 and over of 46.6%.

Of these 232 employed residents aged 15 and over, 47 work within the municipality, representing 20% of the population. To get to work, 90.3% of residents use a personal or company four-wheeled vehicle, 1.7% use public transportation, 2.9% travel by two-wheeled vehicle, bicycle, or on foot, and 5% do not require transportation (working from home).

=== Non-agricultural activities ===
==== Sectors of activity ====
As of 31 December 2019, 61 establishments were located in Estang.

The wholesale and retail trade, transport, accommodation and catering sector is predominant in the municipality as it represents 34.4% of the total number of establishments in the commune (21 out of the 61 companies located in Estang), compared to 27.7% at the departmental level.

==== Businesses and shops ====
The company headquartered within the municipality that generated the highest revenue in 2020 is:

- Les Lacs De Courtes, campsites and parks for caravans or recreational vehicles (€236k)

=== Agriculture ===
The commune is located in Bas-Armagnac, a small agricultural region occupying the western part of the Gers department. In 2020, the main agricultural activity in the commune was viticulture.

The number of active farms headquartered in the commune fell from 63 in the 1988 agricultural census to 39 in 2000, then to 28 in 2010, and finally to 21 in 2020, representing a 67% decrease over 32 years. The same trend is observed at the departmental level, which lost 51% of its farms during this period. The utilized agricultural area within the commune also decreased, from 1,165 hectares in 1988 to 821 hectares in 2020. Concurrently, the average utilized agricultural area per farm increased, rising from 18 to 39 hectares.

== Culture and sights ==
=== Places and monuments ===
==== Notre-Dame Church ====
The church has been listed as a historical monument since 1998.

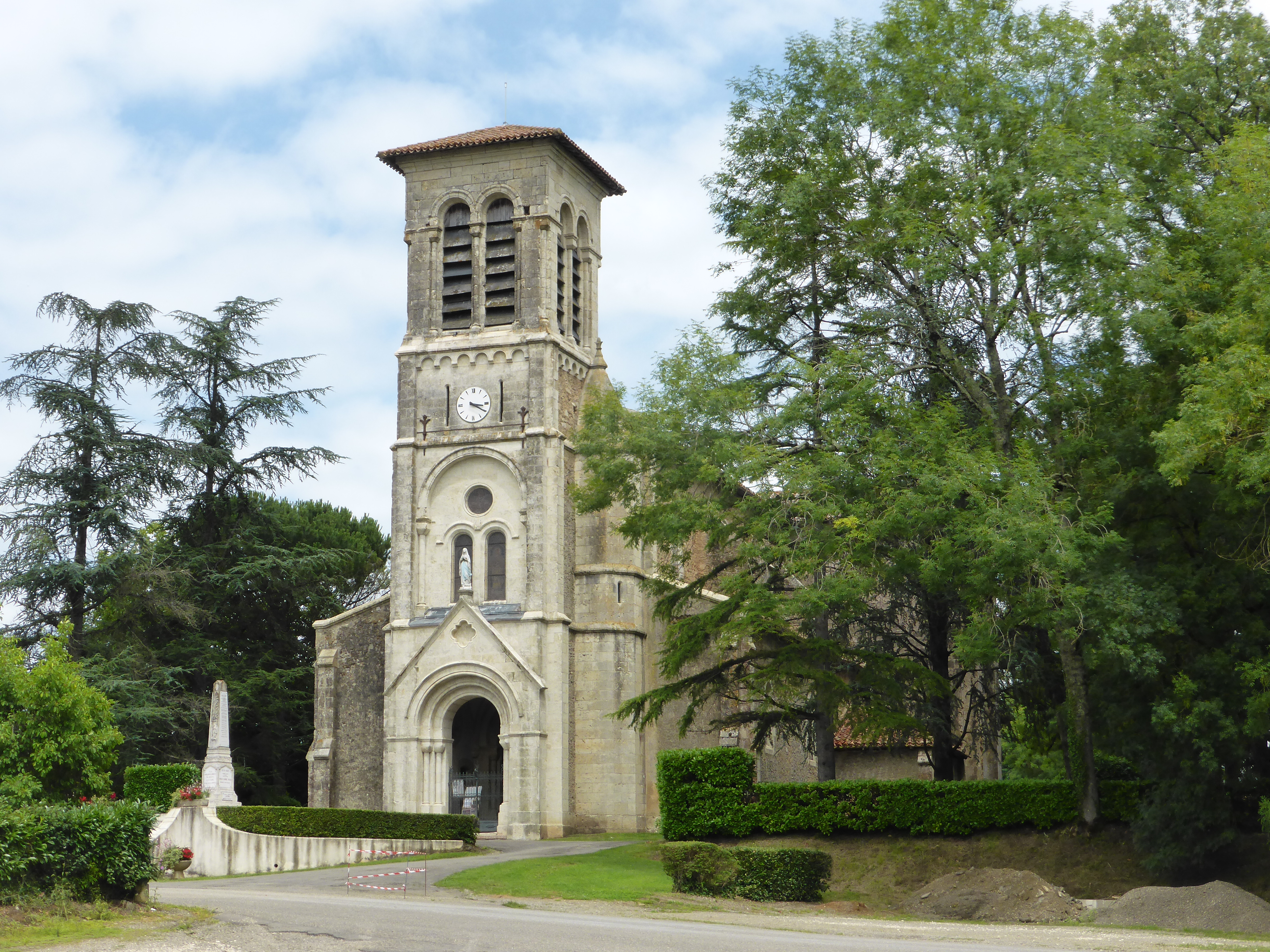
The Notre-Dame d'Estang church.

Of the three churches built in 1860 (there were four in the 16th century), only Notre-Dame remains, its chancel and two apses built in the Romanesque style (with a semi-dome vault). Its construction lasted approximately fifty years, from around 1150 to 1200. It was built in the locality of Castelbielh. The chancel features arcades supported by columns resting on a wide stone bench.

This is reminiscent of the ancient seating found in cloister buildings. The oldest capital above the chancel columns depicts a group of Romanesque lions, while the four later ones, with acanthus leaves, tend towards the Gothic style. The liturgical renovation initiated by Vatican II allowed for the removal of the imposing white marble altar that obscured the columns and capitals at the back.

The new altar, simpler and Romanesque in style, was donated by a generous benefactor from Estang. In the chancel, the old stained-glass windows with their Sulpician imagery were replaced with new ones of modern design (the work of a glassmaker from Folgar). During the last restoration (in the 1960s), the remains of painted decoration were discovered on the walls of two south side chapels. This decoration featured a funeral frieze and haloed figures carrying a processional cross.

This church was largely ruined during the Wars of Religion. In 1572, the Huguenots, under the command of Montgomery, damaged the transept and the nave. These were rebuilt at the end of the 16th century, but the church quickly deteriorated. Its restoration was not completed until the 19th century. Restoration work began in the 19th century, and it was the departmental architect, Léopold Gentil, who proposed a preliminary design in 1862, including an enlargement of the building.

A bay was added to the nave, and the bell tower and sacristy were rebuilt. A hexagonal stair turret was attached to the southwest side of this bell tower-porch (with its ribbed vaulting). To get an idea of the original bell tower, you should use binoculars and point them at the oculus of the south transept (the stained-glass window depicts it).

The project was completed by the architect Hippolyte Durand (1801-1882) starting in 1868. The said architect made the plans for the crypt of Lourdes inaugurated in 1866 (in the presence of Bernadette Soubirous) and for the Basilica of the Immaculate Conception (built from 1866 to 1871).

==== The arenas ====
At the end of the 19th century, very few villages had bullrings: oxcarts served as barriers to contain the racing cows. It was therefore at the initiative of five residents of Estang, united around Léopold Dubos, born in 1876 (and thirty years old, president of the Estang Festival Committee), that the idea of building a bullring was launched. It was built on marshy land with the agreement of Mayor Ernest Caillebar.

The cost of the work was estimated at 36,000 francs at the time, and so these six Estang residents pooled their resources to raise this sum (Léopold Dubos – hardware merchant, Labassa – husband of the postmistress, Hyppolyte Dupuy – pig merchant, Rande – grocer, Adrien Barbe – butcher, and Jean Bartherotte – mason). The western section was built of stone in 1901. From the outset, it was decided to add a roof to the wooden stands to protect them from the elements, and to continue this magnificent timber frame with each resumption of work. At the outbreak of the First World War (1914-1918), the eastern section was under construction.

The mobilization and patriotic fervor of the workers forced the project to be abandoned. It was later, in 1919, that others completed this phase of the work. Makeshift stands enclosed the remaining section, but they had suffered terribly during the war, and instead of replacing them, it was decided to build and re-roof everything. The landowners provided the timber, and the municipality helped pay for the rest. Therefore, begun in 1901, these arenas were completed in 1930, and on 3 September 1939, the Estang Festival Committee decided to transfer ownership to the municipality, subject to reimbursement. For thirty years, farmers and craftsmen rolled up their sleeves to build their bullring in their spare time. Some felled the oak trees; others sawed them. Others nailed the planks and assembled the rafters and battens. All this without asking for a penny! It was slightly enlarged in 1974 at the request of Léon Hugo, then mayor.

In 1984, it was listed as a historical monument and in 1994 as a listed historical monument. It bears the name of a local bullfighting enthusiast who was among those executed on 3 July 1944, Jean Bartherotte. A mason by trade, he was the architect and project manager of the building. On 19 August 1984, it received an unexpected visit from the President of the Republic, François Mitterrand, who presided over a Landes-style bullfight. A plaque commemorates the event.

==== Other minor heritage buildings ====
- Château de Castex d'Armagnac, private residence of the Saint-Pastou family.
- Convent Chapel

This was the chapel of the former convent of the Daughters of Mary, built at the behest of the Du Cor de Duprat family. This religious community led to the creation of a private primary school (an 1854 survey mentions 75 girls and one teacher). The school was founded in 1853 and still existed in 1903, but the Marianists were subsequently forced to withdraw due to the government decree against religious education.

The building is now demolished, and the adjoining chapel is in a state of imminent ruin. The entrance is overgrown with brambles, and ivy clings to the cracks.

At the entrance to the aforementioned chapel, a wrought-iron cross, which has stood for over a century and a half, rests on a stone base. It was erected there in memory of a mission that took place in the parish in 1854. It is adorned with vine branches bearing bunches of grapes and leaves (made of cast iron). At the center of the cross: rays of the sun, a crown of thorns, and a lamb resting on the Book of Revelation.

- Municipal School Building

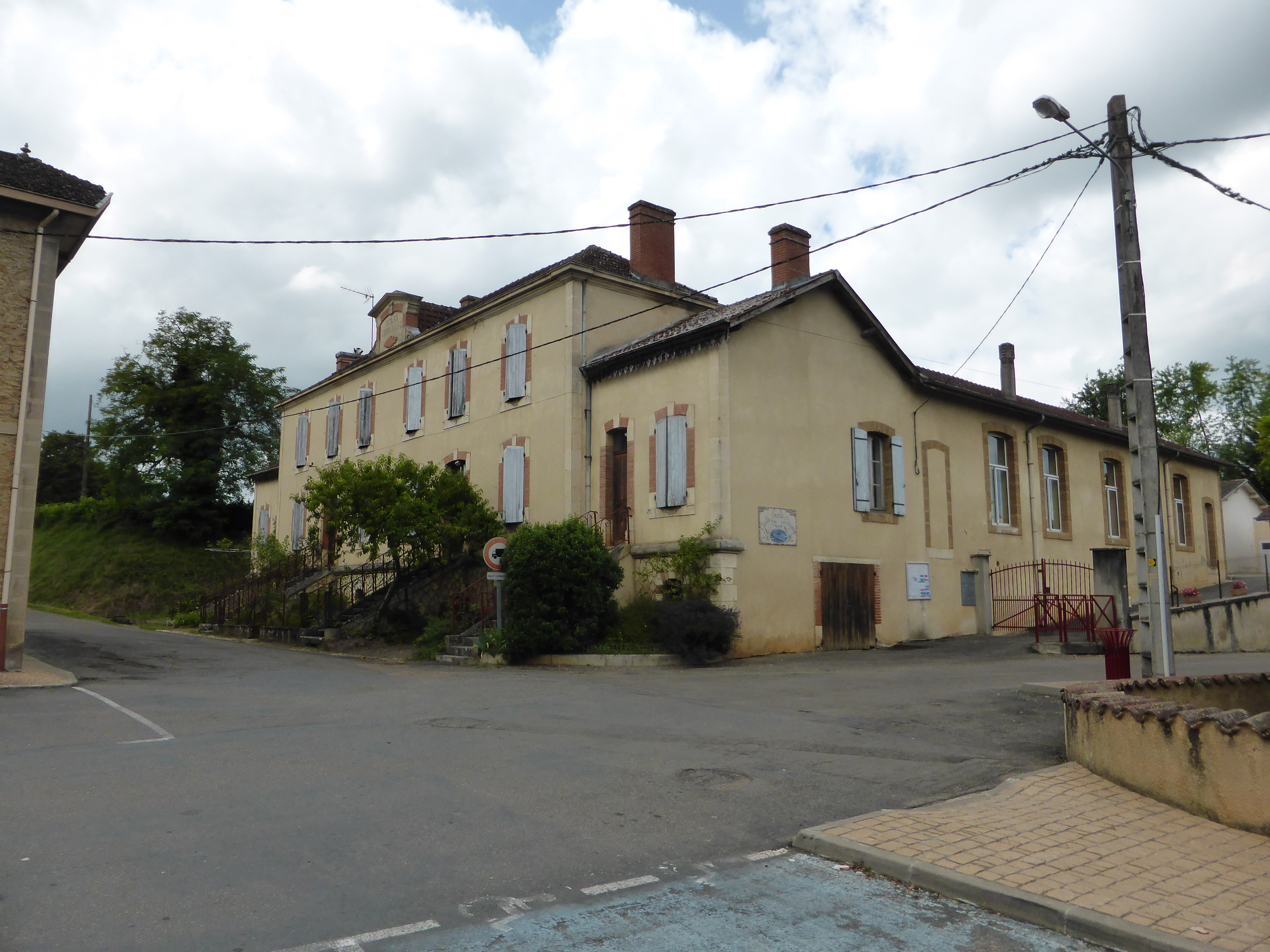
The school in Estang.

This is a complex, completed in 1895 and built during the term of Mayor Ernest Caillebar, who served from 1888 to 1908.

- Former Wash House

Long ago, where the clear waters of the Hount Sante spring forth, stood a wash house with an impluvium. Its timber frame protected the washerwomen from the vagaries of the weather. In those days, wash houses were places of conviviality for women until the arrival of piped water and the washing machine.

=== Heraldry ===
Arms of Estang	Or, a Landes cow and a bullfighter proper; flanked in pale purpure, each flank charged with a silver vine branch leaved of two pieces and fruited of one, supported by a tear of the same; all surmounted by a chief sable charged with the inscription "ESTANG" in capital letters or.

== Population ==
Historical population
Year	Pop.	±% p.a.
1968	892	—
1975	847	−0.74%
1982	818	−0.50%
1990	724	−1.51%
1999	643	−1.31%
2007	673	+0.57%
2012	641	−0.97%
2017	638	−0.09%
2023	668	+0.77%
Source: INSEE

== See also ==
- Communes of the Gers department
