= Mauléon =

Mauléon is the name or part of the name of several communes in France:

- Mauléon, Deux-Sèvres, in the Deux-Sèvres department
  - Mauléon Aerodrome
- Mauléon-d'Armagnac, in the Gers department
- Mauléon-Barousse, in the Hautes-Pyrenees department
- Mauléon-Licharre, in the Pyrénées-Atlantiques department
- Le Bâtard de Mauléon, French novel by Alexandre Dumas.
