= Midouze =

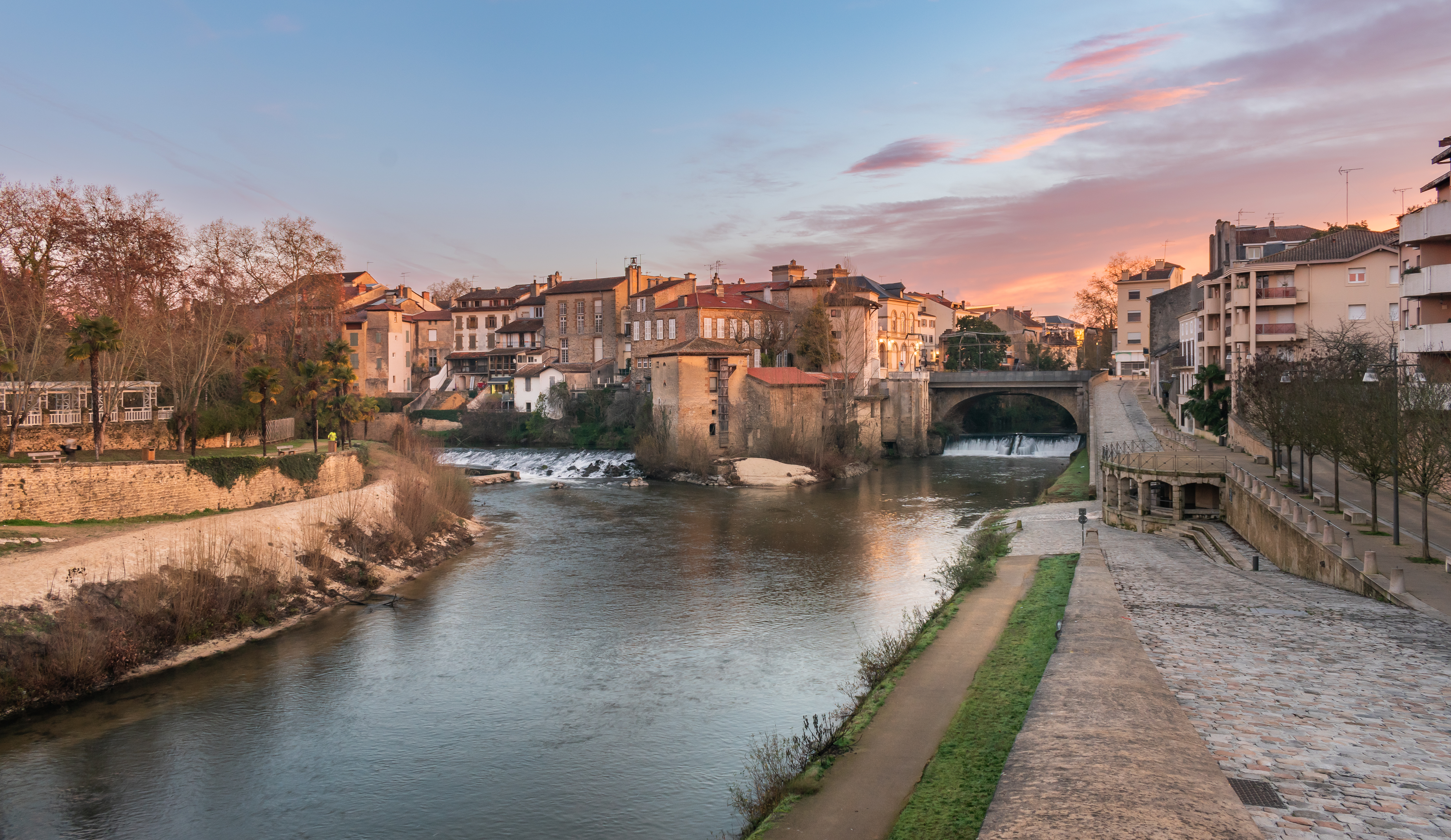
- Confluence of the Douze and the Midou in Mont-de-Marsan

- Location within France Location within Nouvelle-Aquitaine

Location
- Country: France

Physical characteristics
- Source
  - location: confluence of Midou and Douze
- Mouth
  - location: Adour
  - coordinates: 43°48′1″N 0°51′39″W
- Length: 43 + 108 km (27 + 67 mi)
- Basin size: 3,590 km^{2} (1,390 mi^{2})
- Discharge
  - average: 20.5 m^{3}/s (720 cu ft/s)

Basin features
- Progression: Adour→ Atlantic Ocean

The Midouze (French pronunciation: [miduz]; Occitan: Midosa), is a right tributary of the Adour river, in the Landes, in the Southwest of France.

== Name ==
The name Midouze is a portmanteau that fuses the names of the two precursors of the river, the Midou and the Douze.

== Geography ==
The Midouze is the union of the Midou (or Midour) and the Douze. These two rivers rise in the Gers département (in the historical region of Armagnac) and join in Mont-de-Marsan. After a course of 43 kilometres (27 mi), the Midouze flows into the Adour downstream from Tartas. It has a length of 151 kilometres (94 mi) from the source of the Midou.

== Départements and towns ==
- Landes : Mont-de-Marsan, Tartas

== Main tributaries ==
- (R) Estrigon, from Labrit.
- (R) Bez, from Morcenx.
