= Bez (Midouze) =

- Location within France Location within Nouvelle-Aquitaine

Location
- Country: France

Physical characteristics
- Mouth
  - location: Midouze
  - coordinates: 43°52′14″N 0°45′26″W
- Length: 38 km (24 mi)

Basin features
- Progression: Midouze→ Adour→ Atlantic Ocean

The Bez (or Bès) is a right tributary to the river Midouze in the Landes, in the Southwest of France. Its length is 38 km (24 mi). Its name is similar to that of Baïse. The Bez has its origins in the northern Morcenx where it collects the waters of Brassenx. It joins the Midouze in Saint-Yaguen.
