= Brassenx =

Coordinates: 44.02°N 0.89°W

Brassenx was a barony of Upper Landes, in the southwest of France. Its historical capital was Arjuzanx. Its main town is now Morcenx. The etymology of Brassenx is a male Gallo-Roman name: Braccius, plus the pre-Celtic suffix: -incum.

During the English occupation, Arjuzanx became the capital of the barony of Brassenx, where Edward III of England in 1338 published the laws and customs (fors et coutumes) of Brassenx.

== Sources ==
The French Wikipedia (3 Feb 2009)
