= Morcenx-la-Nouvelle =

- Commune
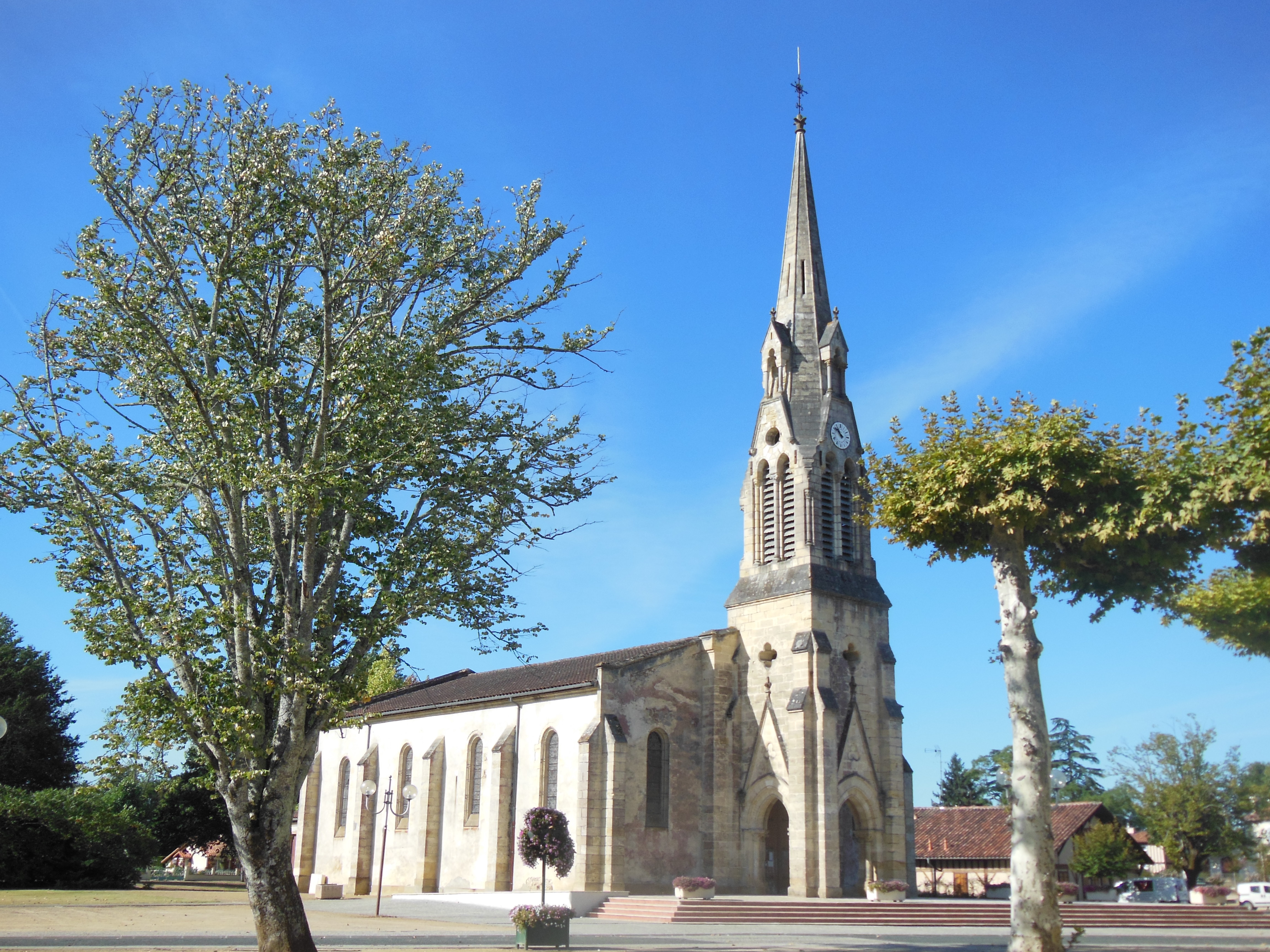
- Location of Morcenx-la-Nouvelle
- Location within France Location within Nouvelle-Aquitaine
- Coordinates: 44°02′02″N 0°54′47″W
- Country: France
- Region: Nouvelle-Aquitaine
- Department: Landes
- Arrondissement: Mont-de-Marsan
- Canton: Pays morcenais tarusate
- Intercommunality: Pays Morcenais

Government
  - Mayor (2020–2026): Paul Carrère
- Area^{1}: 138.30 km^{2} (53.40 sq mi)
- Elevation: 74 m (243 ft)
- Highest elevation: 104 m (341 ft)
- Lowest elevation: 41 m (135 ft)
- Population (2023): 5,022
  - Density: 36.31/km^{2} (94.05/sq mi)
- Time zone: UTC+01:00 (CET)
  - Summer (DST): UTC+02:00 (CEST)
- INSEE/Postal code: 40197 /40110
- ^{1} French Land Register data, which excludes lakes, ponds, glaciers > 1 km^{2} (0.386 sq mi or 247 acres) and river estuaries.

Morcenx-la-Nouvelle (French pronunciation: [mɔʁsɛ̃ks la nuvɛl]; Gascon: Morcens la Navèra) is a commune in the Landes department in Nouvelle-Aquitaine in southwestern France. It was established on 1 January 2019 by merger of the former communes of Morcenx (the seat), Arjuzanx, Garrosse and Sindères.

== Population ==
Population data refer to the commune in its geography as of January 2025.

Historical population
Year	Pop.	±% p.a.
1968	6,042	—
1975	6,310	+0.62%
1982	6,015	−0.68%
1990	5,000	−2.28%
1999	5,074	+0.16%
2007	5,307	+0.56%
2012	5,211	−0.36%
2017	5,052	−0.62%
2023	5,022	−0.10%
Source: INSEE

== See also ==
- Communes of the Landes department
