= Sindères =

- Part of Morcenx-la-Nouvelle
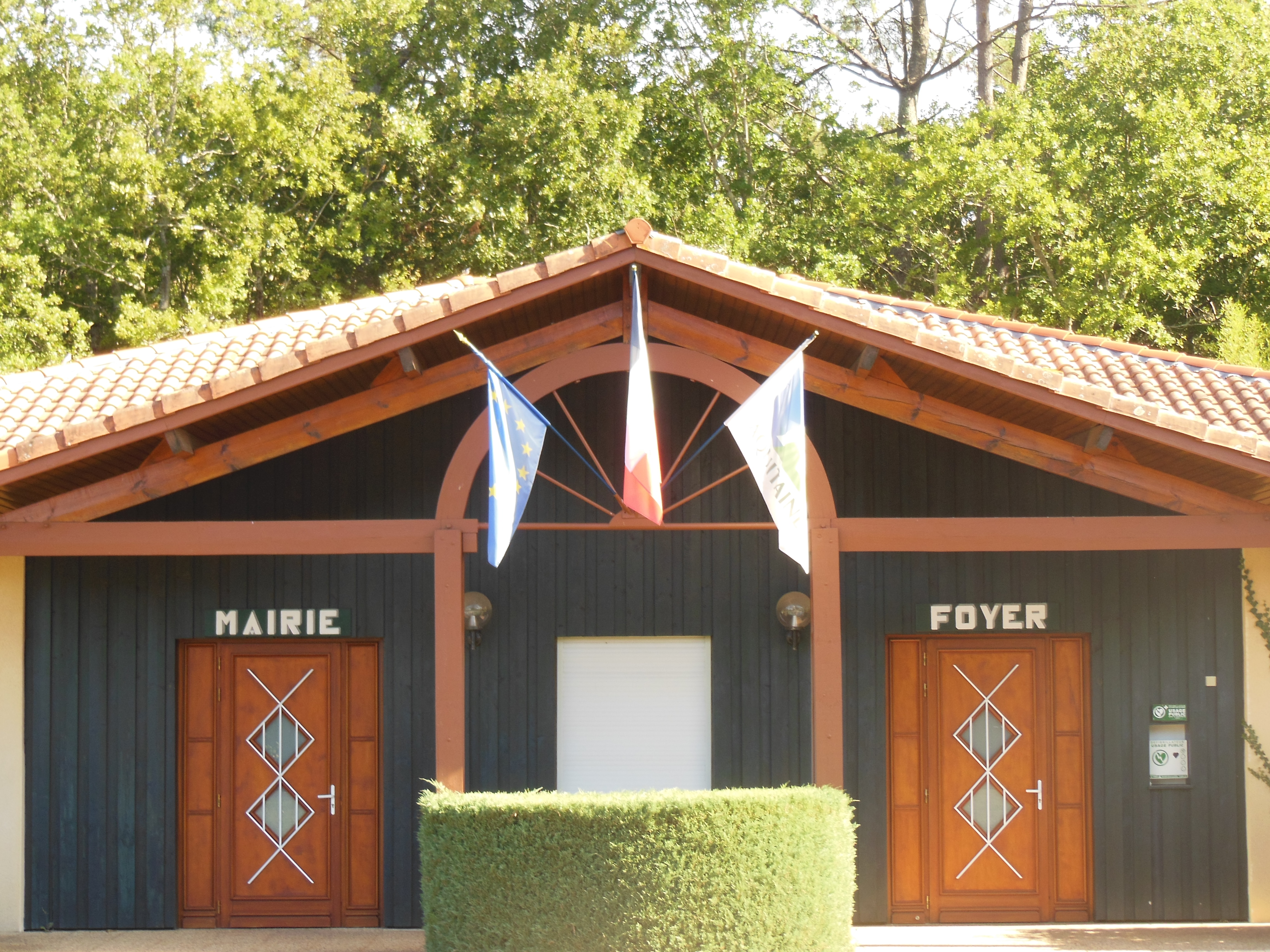
- Town hall
- Location of Sindères
- Location within France Location within Nouvelle-Aquitaine
- Coordinates: 44°01′39″N 0°59′01″W
- Country: France
- Region: Nouvelle-Aquitaine
- Department: Landes
- Arrondissement: Mont-de-Marsan
- Canton: Pays morcenais tarusate
- Commune: Morcenx-la-Nouvelle
- Area^{1}: 20.34 km^{2} (7.85 sq mi)
- Elevation: 78 m (256 ft)
- Highest elevation: 96 m (315 ft)
- Lowest elevation: 56 m (184 ft)
- Population (2023): 181
  - Density: 8.90/km^{2} (23.0/sq mi)
- Time zone: UTC+01:00 (CET)
  - Summer (DST): UTC+02:00 (CEST)
- Postal code: 40110
- ^{1} French Land Register data, which excludes lakes, ponds, glaciers > 1 km^{2} (0.386 sq mi or 247 acres) and river estuaries.

Sindères (French pronunciation: [sɛ̃dɛʁ]; Gascon: Sindèras) is a former commune in the Landes department in Nouvelle-Aquitaine in southwestern France. On 1 January 2019, it was merged into the new commune Morcenx-la-Nouvelle.

== See also ==
- Communes of the Landes department
