= Julien Peridier =

French electrical engineer and astronomer

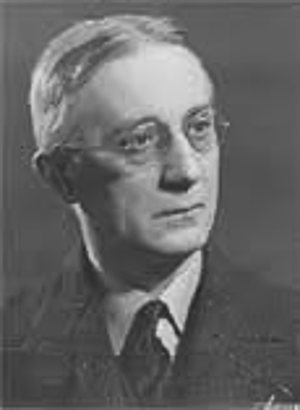
Julien Peridier

Julien Péridier (1882 – April 19, 1967) was a French electrical engineer and amateur astronomer. For his work he was made an Officer of the Legion of Honour. In 1933 he founded a private observatory at Le Houga (Gers), France. After his death, his library and instruments were acquired by the McDonald Observatory at the University of Texas for use in teaching astronomy.

The double 8-inch (200 mm) refracting telescope at Le Houga was used extensively for studies of the planets and the teaching of young astronomers.

In 1959 his observatory was part of an observational campaign regarding an occultation of Regulus by Venus. The team of Harvard observers at Le Houga was led by Gérard de Vaucouleurs, who had previously collaborated with Mr. Péridier on studies at the observatory. The success of the 1959 work started a five-year collaboration with NASA on photometry of the Moon and planets using a 12-inch (300 mm) reflector.

He was married to Adrienne Blanc-Péridier, who was an accomplished author of one-act plays, romantic novels, and biographies.

A crater on Mars is named in his honor.
