= Midou =

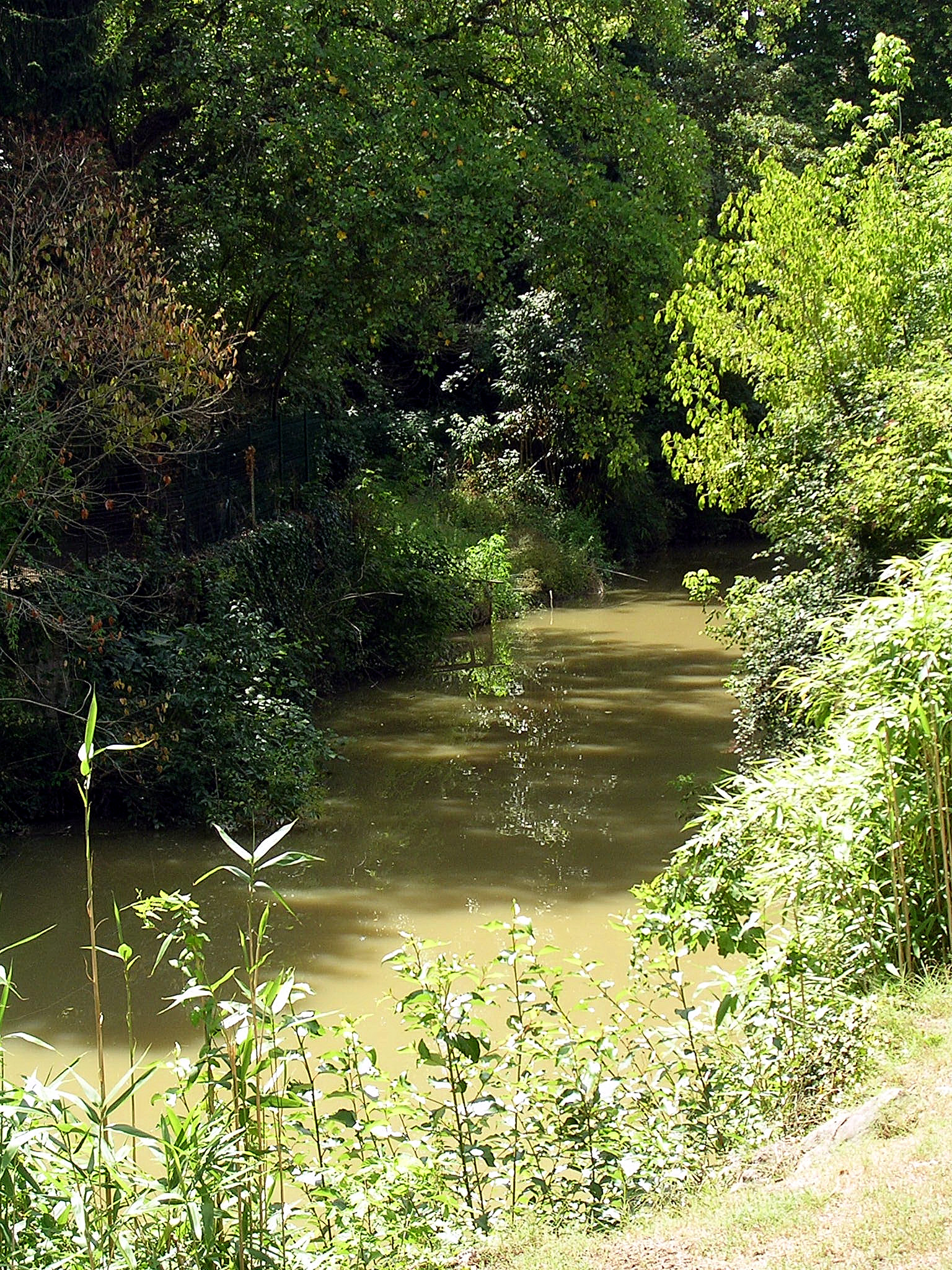
- The Midou in Mont-de-Marsan downriver of the donjon Lacataye

- Location within France Location within Nouvelle-Aquitaine

Location
- Country: France

Physical characteristics
- Source
  - location: Gers
- Mouth
  - location: Midouze
  - coordinates: 43°53′29″N 0°30′9″W
- Length: 108 km (67 mi)

Basin features
- Progression: Midouze→ Adour→ Atlantic Ocean

The Midou (French pronunciation: [midu]; Occitan: Midor) or Midour is the left precursor of the Midouze, in the Southwest of France.

== Geography ==
The Midou rises in Armagnac, in the Gers département. It joins the Douze in Mont-de-Marsan to constitute the Midouze, a tributary of the Adour. It is considered the upper course of the Midouze by Sandre.

== Départements and towns ==
- Gers: by Nogaro
- Landes: Villeneuve-de-Marsan, Mont-de-Marsan

== Main tributaries ==
- (R) Riberette or Midour de Devant.
- (R) Midouzon,
- (L) Izaute, from Termes-d'Armagnac,
  - (R) Jurane,
- (R) Estang.
- (L) Ludon, from Le Houga.

N.B. : (R) = right tributary; (L) = left tributary
