= Monclar, Gers =

Monclar
- Commune
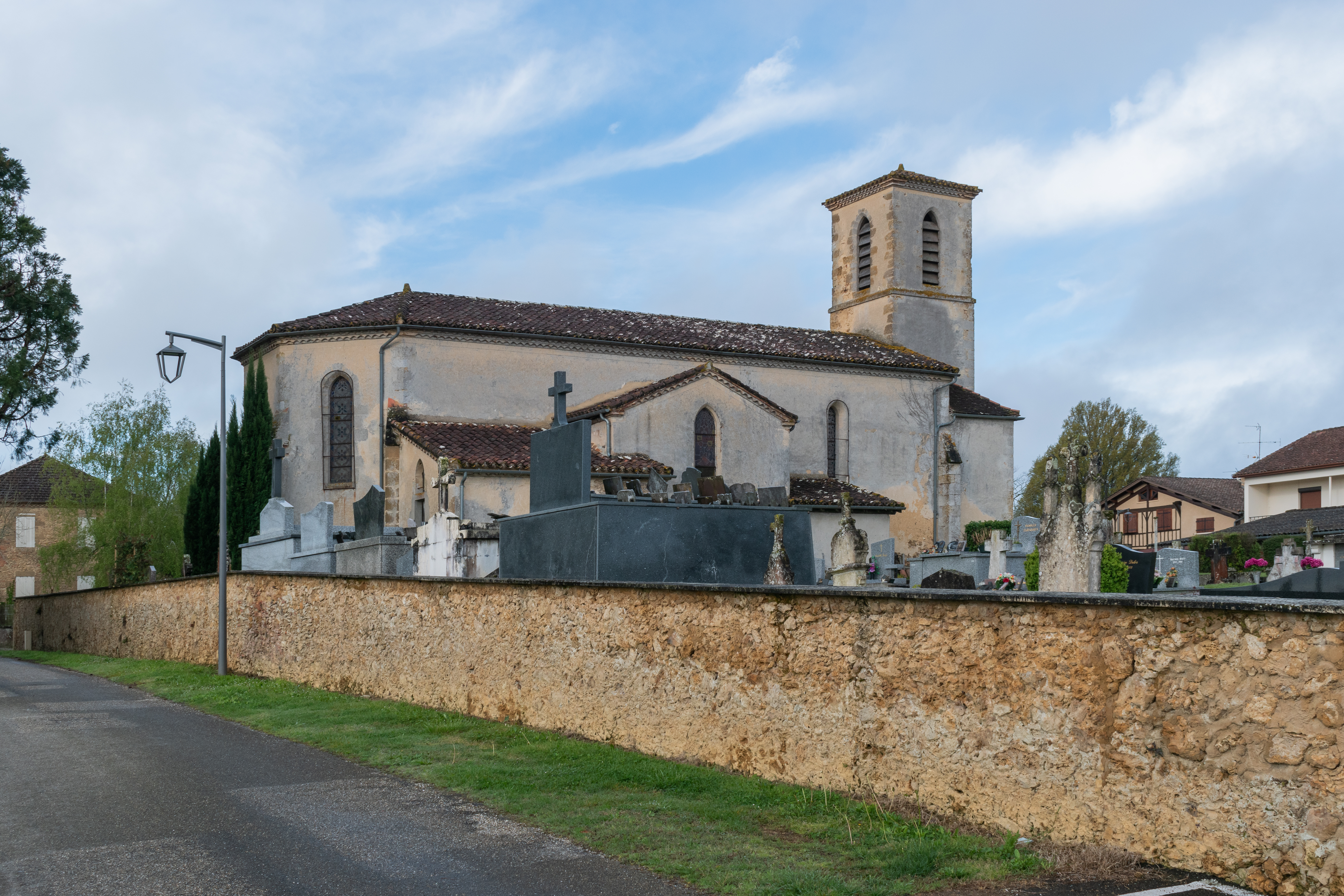
- Saint Michael church in Monclar
- Location of Monclar
- Location within France Location within Occitanie
- Coordinates: 43°55′12″N 0°06′22″W
- Country: France
- Region: Occitania
- Department: Gers
- Arrondissement: Condom
- Canton: Grand-Bas-Armagnac
- Intercommunality: Grand-Armagnac

Government
  - Mayor (2020–2026): Josette Fitte
- Area^{1}: 10.12 km^{2} (3.91 sq mi)
- Elevation: 130 m (430 ft)
- Highest elevation: 149 m (489 ft)
- Lowest elevation: 92 m (302 ft)
- Population (2023): 217
  - Density: 21.4/km^{2} (55.5/sq mi)
- Time zone: UTC+01:00 (CET)
  - Summer (DST): UTC+02:00 (CEST)
- INSEE/Postal code: 32264 /32150
- ^{1} French Land Register data, which excludes lakes, ponds, glaciers > 1 km^{2} (0.386 sq mi or 247 acres) and river estuaries.

Monclar (French pronunciation: [mɔ̃klaʁ]; Gascon: Montclar d'Armanhac) is a commune in the Gers department in southwestern France.

== Geography ==
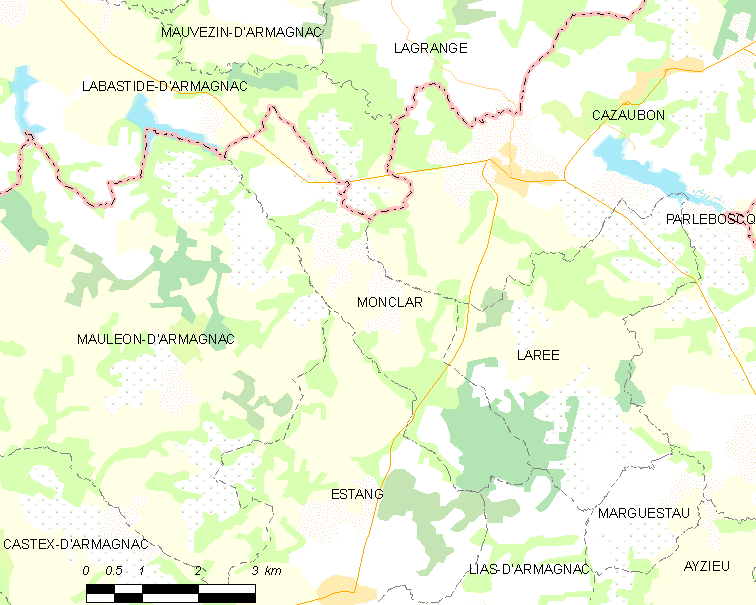
Monclar and its surrounding communes

== Population ==
Historical population
Year	Pop.	±% p.a.
1968	162	—
1975	147	−1.38%
1982	144	−0.29%
1990	153	+0.76%
1999	129	−1.88%
2007	179	+4.18%
2012	199	+2.14%
2017	192	−0.71%
2023	217	+2.06%
Source: INSEE

== See also ==
- Communes of the Gers department
