= Douze =

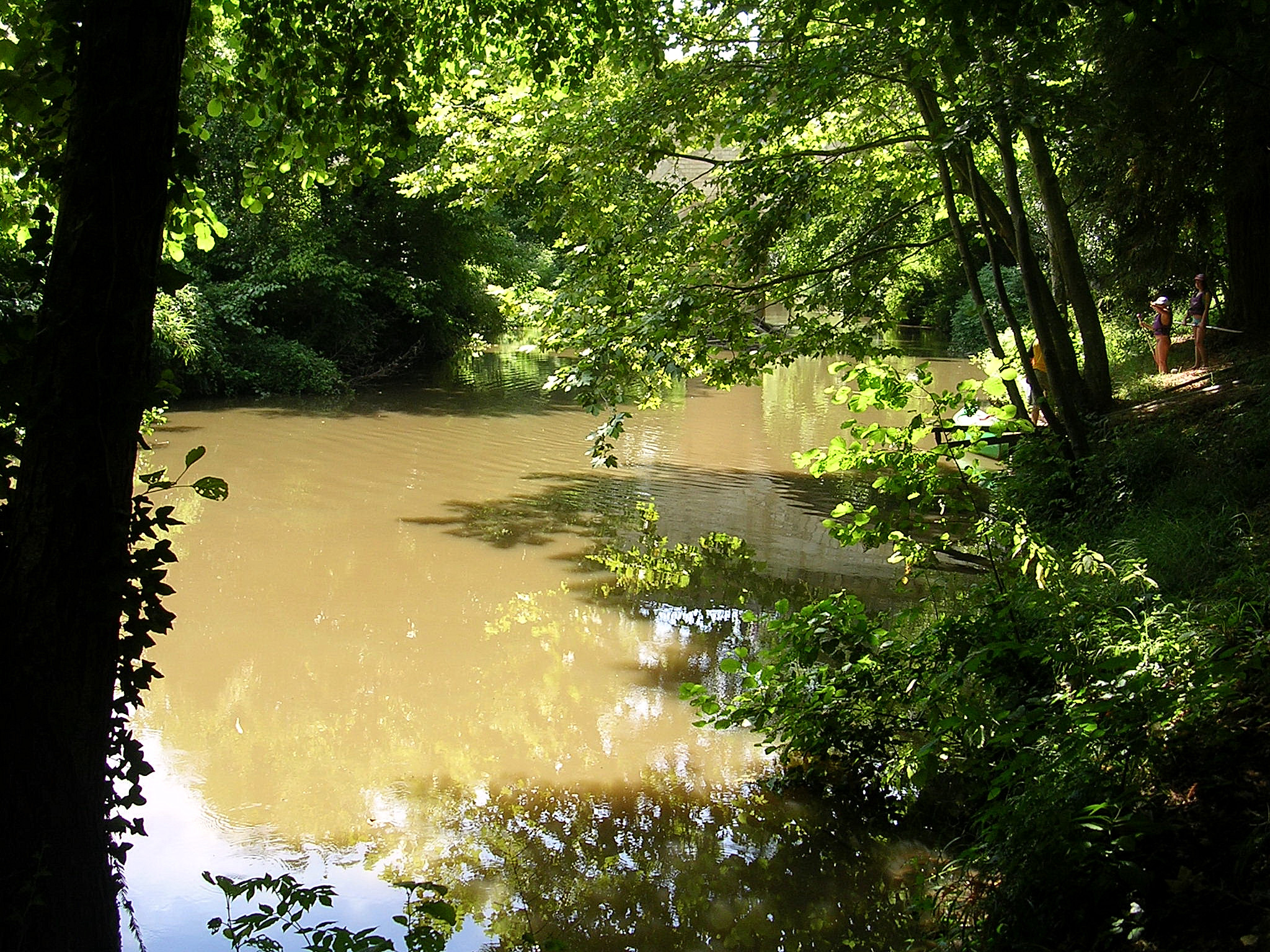
- The Douze in Mont-de-Marsan

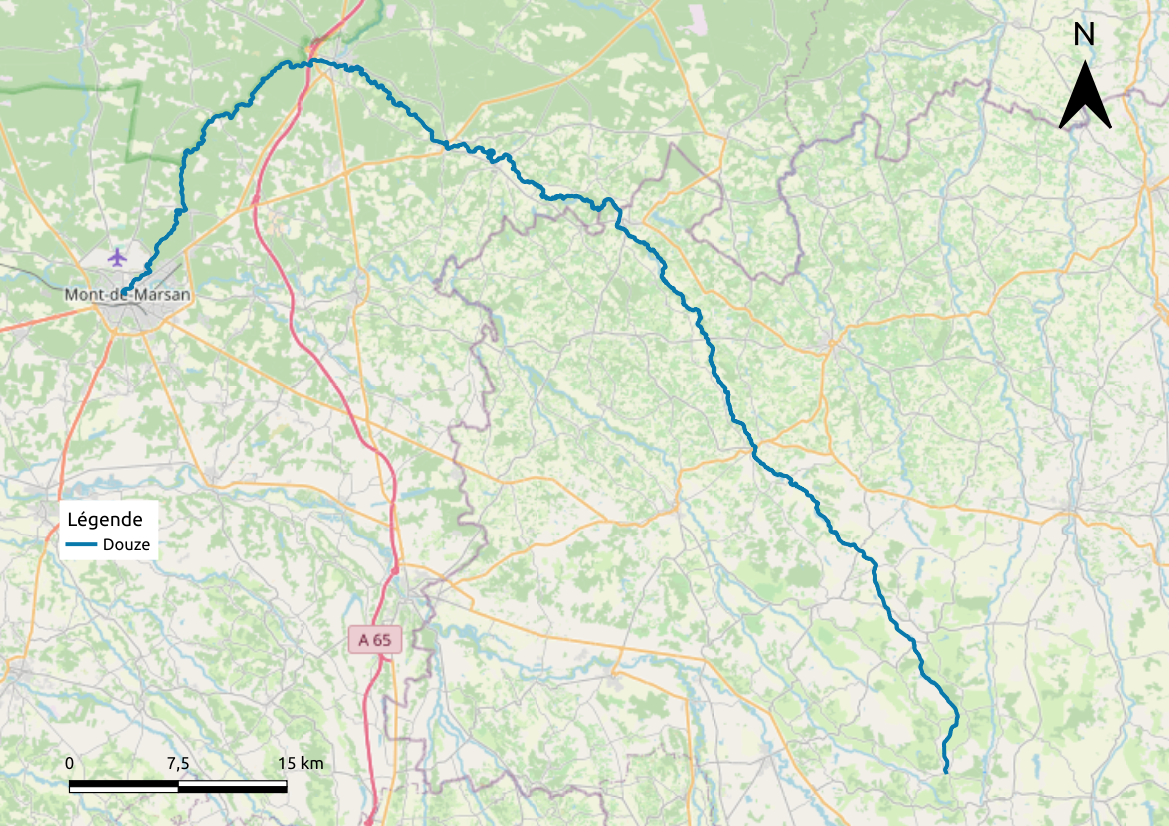
- Course of the Douze

- Location within France Location within Nouvelle-Aquitaine

Location
- Country: France

Physical characteristics
- Source
  - location: Gers
- Mouth
  - location: Midouze
  - coordinates: 43°53′29″N 0°30′9″W
- Length: 124 km (77 mi)

Basin features
- Progression: Midouze→ Adour→ Atlantic Ocean

The Douze (French pronunciation: [duz]; Occitan: Dosa) is the right source river of the Midouze, in the Landes forest, in the southwest of France. It is 123.5 km (76.7 mi) long.

== Geography ==
The Douze rises in Armagnac, in the Gers département. It joins the Midou in Mont-de-Marsan to constitute the Midouze, a tributary of the Adour.

== Départements and towns ==
- Gers: Peyrusse-Grande, Espas, Manciet, Cazaubon.
- Landes: Labastide-d'Armagnac, Saint Justin, Roquefort.

== Main tributaries ==
- (R) Estampon, in Roquefort.
- (R) Gouaneyre.
