= Mauléon Aerodrome =

Civil airfield in Mauléon, Deux-Sèvres, France

- IATA: none; ICAO: LFJB

Summary
- Coordinates: 46°54′10″N 000°41′52″W

Map

Runways
Direction	Length		Surface
Direction	ft	m	Surface
04/22	4,265	1,300	Asphalt

Mauléon Aerodrome (ICAO: LFJB) is a civil airfield, open to public aeronautical circulation (CAP)1, located 4 kilometres (2.5 mi) east-south-east of Mauléon, Deux-Sèvres in the Nouvelle-Aquitaine region of France.

This airfield is used for leisure activities and tourism (light aviation and helicopter).

== History ==
Near the airfield runway, the Bocage flying club was created in 1983. In 2014, an ultralight aviation section was created.

== Facilities ==
The airfield has one asphalt paved runway, designated 04/22, which measures 1,300 by 20 metres (4,265 by 66 ft).

It has a diurnal and nocturnal marking (low intensity lights).

The aerodrome is not controlled. Communications are carried out in self-information on the frequency of 123.500 MHz.

It is approved with limitations for night visual flight rules (VFR) flight.

Added to this are present:

- A parking area
- Hangars
- Fueling station (110LL)2

== See also ==
- Aero club
- Directorate General for Civil Aviation
- List of airports in France
