= Panjas =

- Commune
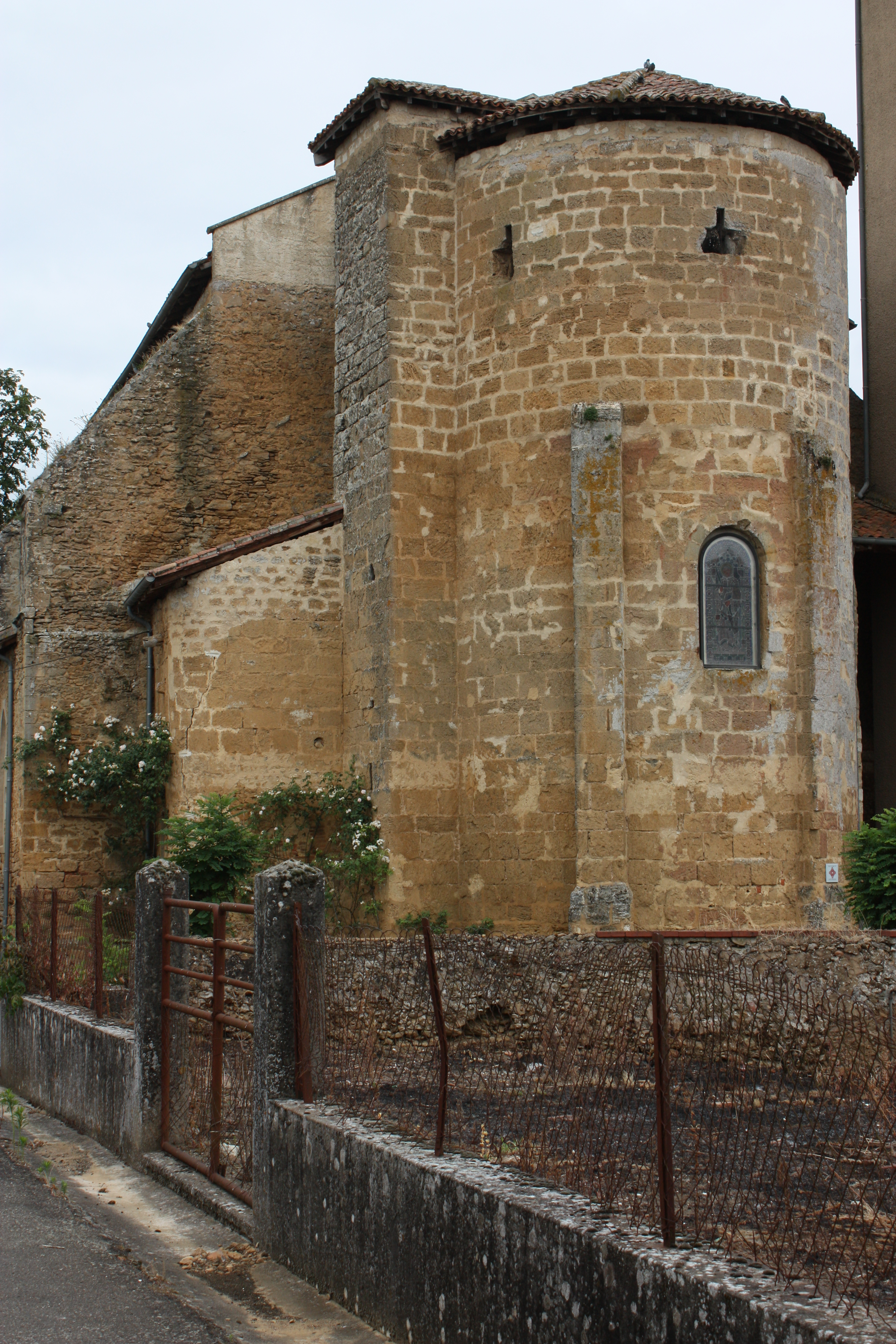
- The church in Panjas

- Coat of arms
- Location of Panjas
- Location within France Location within Occitanie
- Coordinates: 43°49′19″N 0°05′18″W
- Country: France
- Region: Occitania
- Department: Gers
- Arrondissement: Condom
- Canton: Grand-Bas-Armagnac
- Intercommunality: Grand-Armagnac

Government
  - Mayor (2020–2026): Marie-Claude Mauras
- Area^{1}: 20.01 km^{2} (7.73 sq mi)
- Elevation: 123 m (404 ft)
- Highest elevation: 184 m (604 ft)
- Lowest elevation: 74 m (243 ft)
- Population (2023): 431
  - Density: 21.5/km^{2} (55.8/sq mi)
- Time zone: UTC+01:00 (CET)
  - Summer (DST): UTC+02:00 (CEST)
- INSEE/Postal code: 32305 /32110
- ^{1} French Land Register data, which excludes lakes, ponds, glaciers > 1 km^{2} (0.386 sq mi or 247 acres) and river estuaries.

Panjas is a commune in the Gers department in southwestern France.

== Geography ==
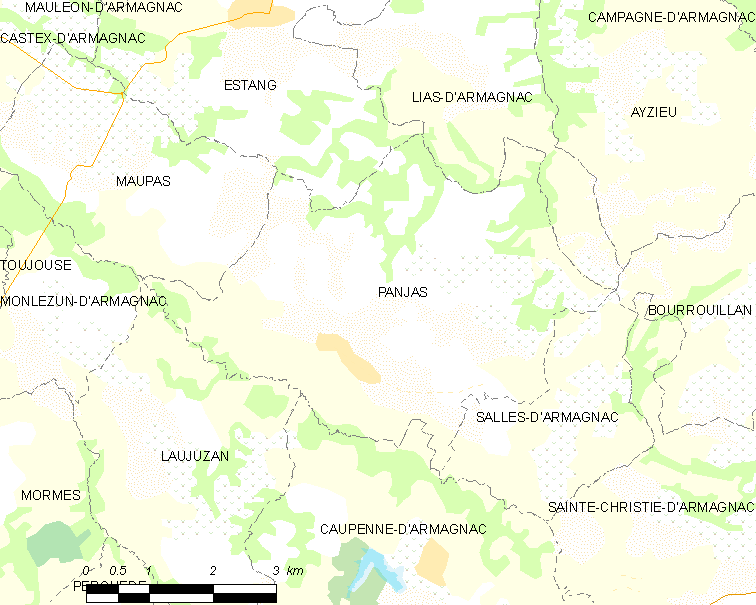
Panjas and its surrounding communes

== Population ==
Historical population
Year	Pop.	±% p.a.
1968	559	—
1975	518	−1.08%
1982	437	−2.40%
1990	447	+0.28%
1999	398	−1.28%
2007	379	−0.61%
2012	387	+0.42%
2017	400	+0.66%
2023	431	+1.25%
Source: INSEE

== See also ==
- Communes of the Gers department
