= Arjuzanx =

- Part of Morcenx-la-Nouvelle
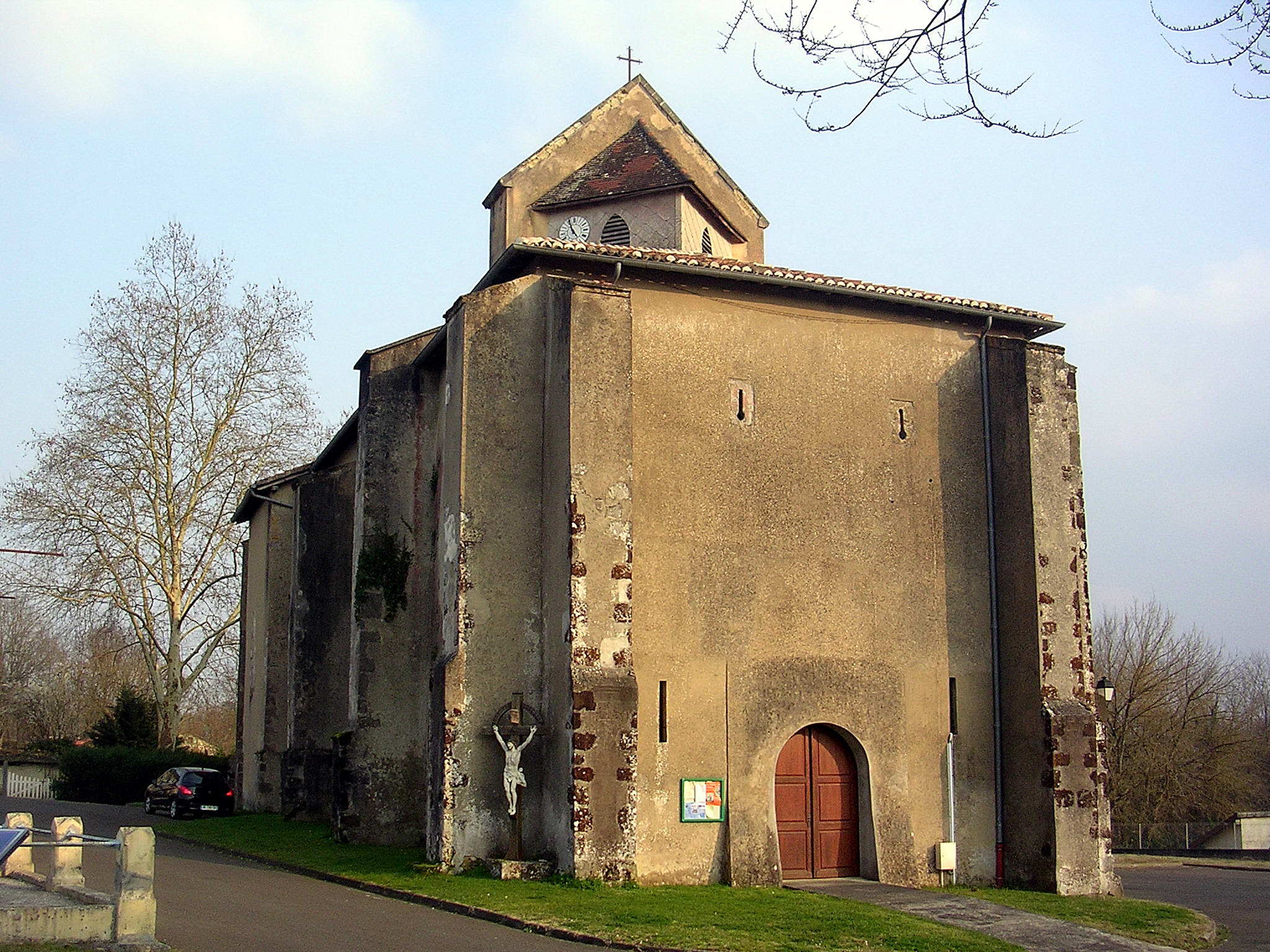
- The church of Arjuzanx
- Location of Arjuzanx
- Location within France Location within Nouvelle-Aquitaine
- Coordinates: 44°00′48″N 0°51′16″W
- Country: France
- Region: Nouvelle-Aquitaine
- Department: Landes
- Arrondissement: Mont-de-Marsan
- Canton: Pays morcenais tarusate
- Commune: Morcenx-la-Nouvelle
- Area^{1}: 29.2 km^{2} (11.3 sq mi)
- Elevation: 62 m (203 ft)
- Highest elevation: 103 m (338 ft)
- Lowest elevation: 41 m (135 ft)
- Population (2023): 183
  - Density: 6.27/km^{2} (16.2/sq mi)
- Time zone: UTC+01:00 (CET)
  - Summer (DST): UTC+02:00 (CEST)
- Postal code: 40110
- ^{1} French Land Register data, which excludes lakes, ponds, glaciers > 1 km^{2} (0.386 sq mi or 247 acres) and river estuaries.

Arjuzanx (French pronunciation: [aʁʒyzɑ̃]; Gascon: Arjusan) is a former commune of the Landes department in Nouvelle-Aquitaine in southwestern France. On 1 January 2019, it was merged into the new commune Morcenx-la-Nouvelle.

== See also ==
- Communes of the Landes department
