= Le Houga =

- Commune
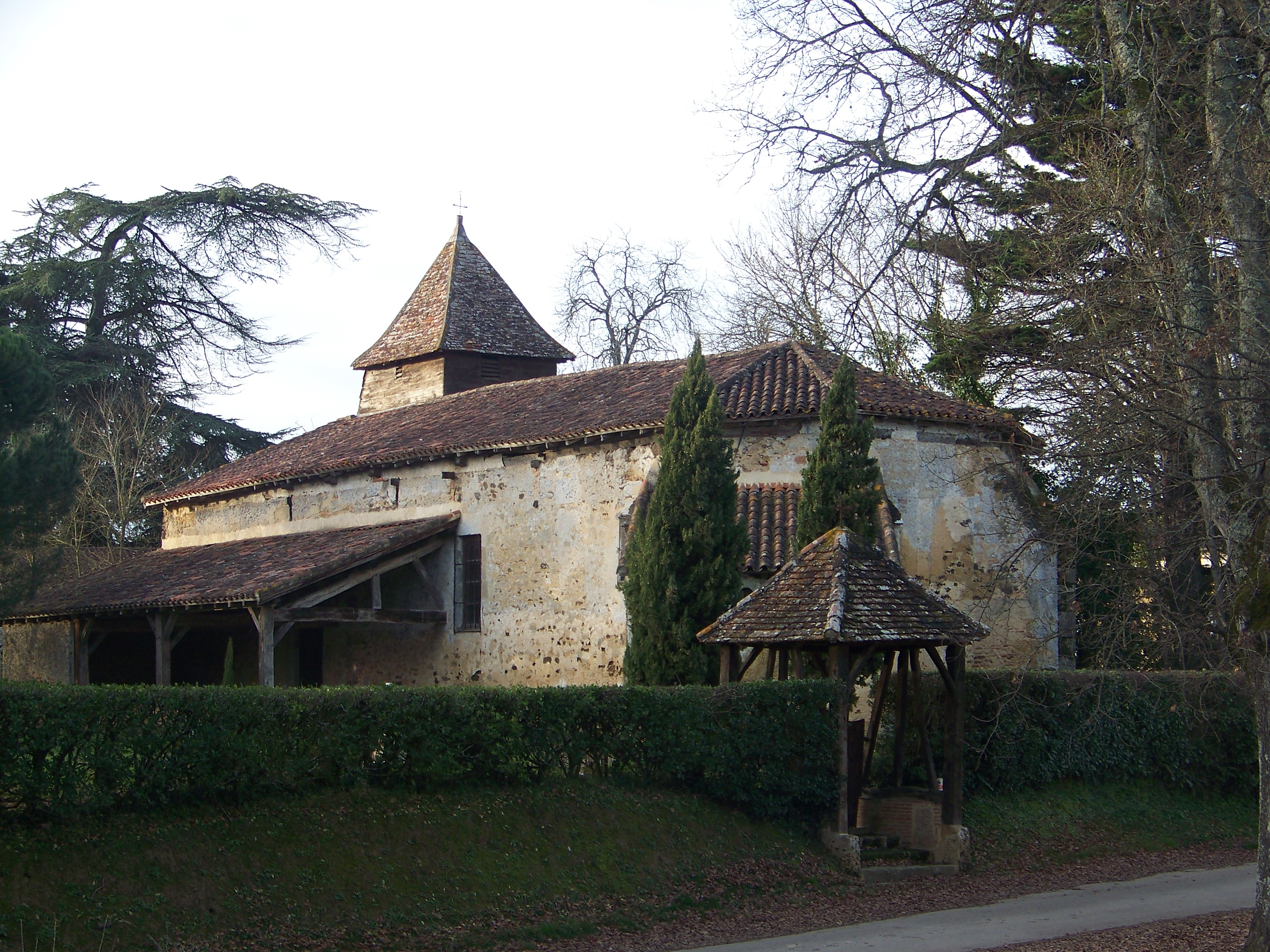
- The church in Le Houga

- Coat of arms
- Location of Le Houga
- Location within France Location within Occitanie
- Coordinates: 43°46′34″N 0°10′46″W
- Country: France
- Region: Occitania
- Department: Gers
- Arrondissement: Condom
- Canton: Grand-Bas-Armagnac
- Intercommunality: Bas-Armagnac

Government
  - Mayor (2020–2026): Patricia Galabert
- Area^{1}: 31.51 km^{2} (12.17 sq mi)
- Elevation: 148 m (486 ft)
- Highest elevation: 153 m (502 ft)
- Lowest elevation: 87 m (285 ft)
- Population (2023): 1,202
  - Density: 38.15/km^{2} (98.80/sq mi)
- Time zone: UTC+01:00 (CET)
  - Summer (DST): UTC+02:00 (CEST)
- INSEE/Postal code: 32155 /32460
- ^{1} French Land Register data, which excludes lakes, ponds, glaciers > 1 km^{2} (0.386 sq mi or 247 acres) and river estuaries.

Le Houga (French pronunciation: [lə uɡa]; Occitan: Lo Haugar) is a commune in the Gers department in southwestern France.

== Geography ==
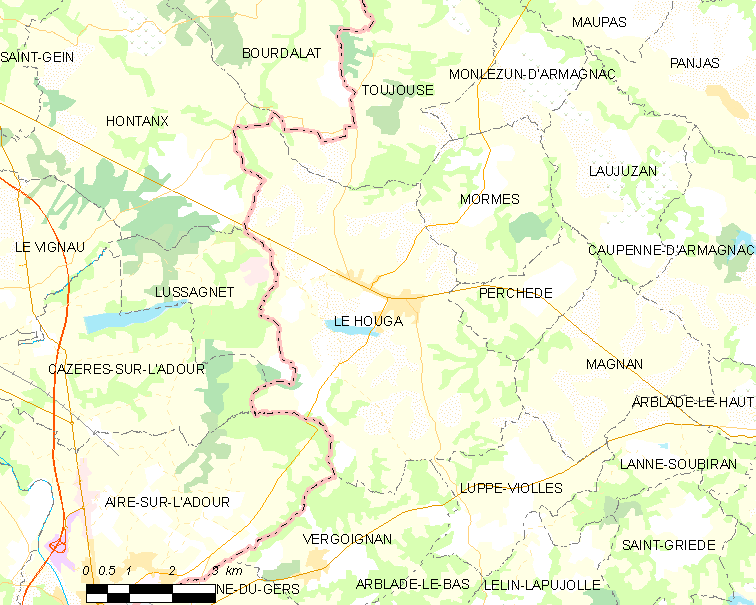
Le Houga and its surrounding communes

== Population ==
Historical population
Year	Pop.	±% p.a.
1968	1,182	—
1975	1,124	−0.72%
1982	1,173	+0.61%
1990	1,166	−0.07%
1999	1,101	−0.64%
2007	1,129	+0.31%
2012	1,185	+0.97%
2017	1,170	−0.25%
2023	1,202	+0.45%
Source: INSEE

== See also ==
- Communes of the Gers department
- Julien Péridier
