= Morcenx =

Commune in Landes, France

- Part of Morcenx-la-Nouvelle
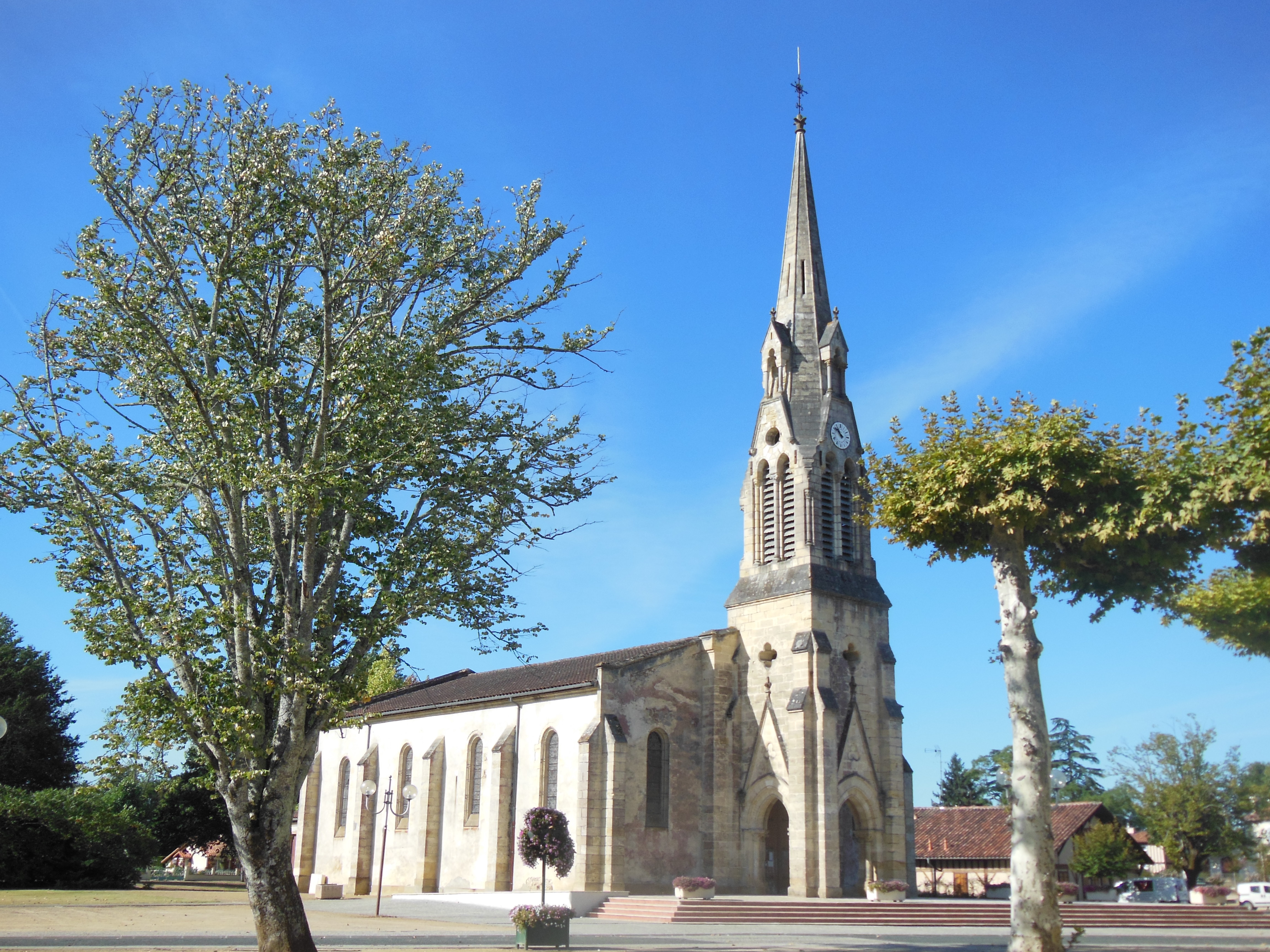

- Coat of arms
- Location of Morcenx
- Location within France Location within Nouvelle-Aquitaine
- Coordinates: 44°02′02″N 0°54′47″W
- Country: France
- Region: Nouvelle-Aquitaine
- Department: Landes
- Arrondissement: Mont-de-Marsan
- Canton: Pays morcenais tarusate
- Commune: Morcenx-la-Nouvelle
- Area^{1}: 62.08 km^{2} (23.97 sq mi)
- Elevation: 74 m (243 ft)
- Highest elevation: 104 m (341 ft)
- Lowest elevation: 50 m (160 ft)
- Population (2016): 4,397
  - Density: 70.83/km^{2} (183.4/sq mi)
- Time zone: UTC+01:00 (CET)
  - Summer (DST): UTC+02:00 (CEST)
- Postal code: 40110
- ^{1} French Land Register data, which excludes lakes, ponds, glaciers > 1 km^{2} (0.386 sq mi or 247 acres) and river estuaries.

Morcenx (French pronunciation: [mɔʁ.sɛ̃ks]; Gascon: Morcens) is a former commune in the Landes department in Nouvelle-Aquitaine in southwestern France. On 1 January 2019, it was merged into the new commune Morcenx-la-Nouvelle.

== Geography ==
Morcenx is situated in the Grande Lande in the Landes forest (forêt des Landes) on the Bez. It is accessed by the A63 motorway, exit 14 for Onesse-et-Laharie.

== History ==
The Morcenx area, bordered by the Bez and its tributaries, seems to have been occupied since prehistoric times. Flint tools, domestic furniture, and a cinerary (cremation ashes) box from the 1st Iron Age have been found there.

The church Saint Pierre de Morcencz was mentioned in the Liber rubeus in the 12th century.

== Population ==
Historical population

Year	Pop.	±% p.a.
1793	645	—
1800	567	−1.82%
1806	678	+3.02%
1821	714	+0.35%
1831	811	+1.28%
1836	794	−0.42%
1841	795	+0.03%
1846	902	+2.56%
1851	919	+0.37%
1856	1,221	+5.85%
1861	1,321	+1.59%
1866	1,595	+3.84%
1872	1,718	+1.25%
1876	2,087	+4.98%
1881	2,049	−0.37%
1886	2,045	−0.04%
1891	2,193	+1.41%
1896	2,252	+0.53%

Year	Pop.	±% p.a.
1901	2,230	−0.20%
1906	2,373	+1.25%
1911	2,663	+2.33%
1921	2,768	+0.39%
1926	2,921	+1.08%
1931	3,208	+1.89%
1936	3,004	−1.31%
1946	3,033	+0.10%
1954	3,013	−0.08%
1962	4,166	+4.13%
1968	5,305	+4.11%
1975	5,690	+1.01%
1982	5,406	−0.73%
1990	4,332	−2.73%
1999	4,383	+0.13%
2007	4,586	+0.57%
2012	4,505	−0.36%
2016	4,397	−0.60%

Source: EHESS and INSEE

== See also ==
- Communes of the Landes department
