= Mauléon-d'Armagnac =

- Commune
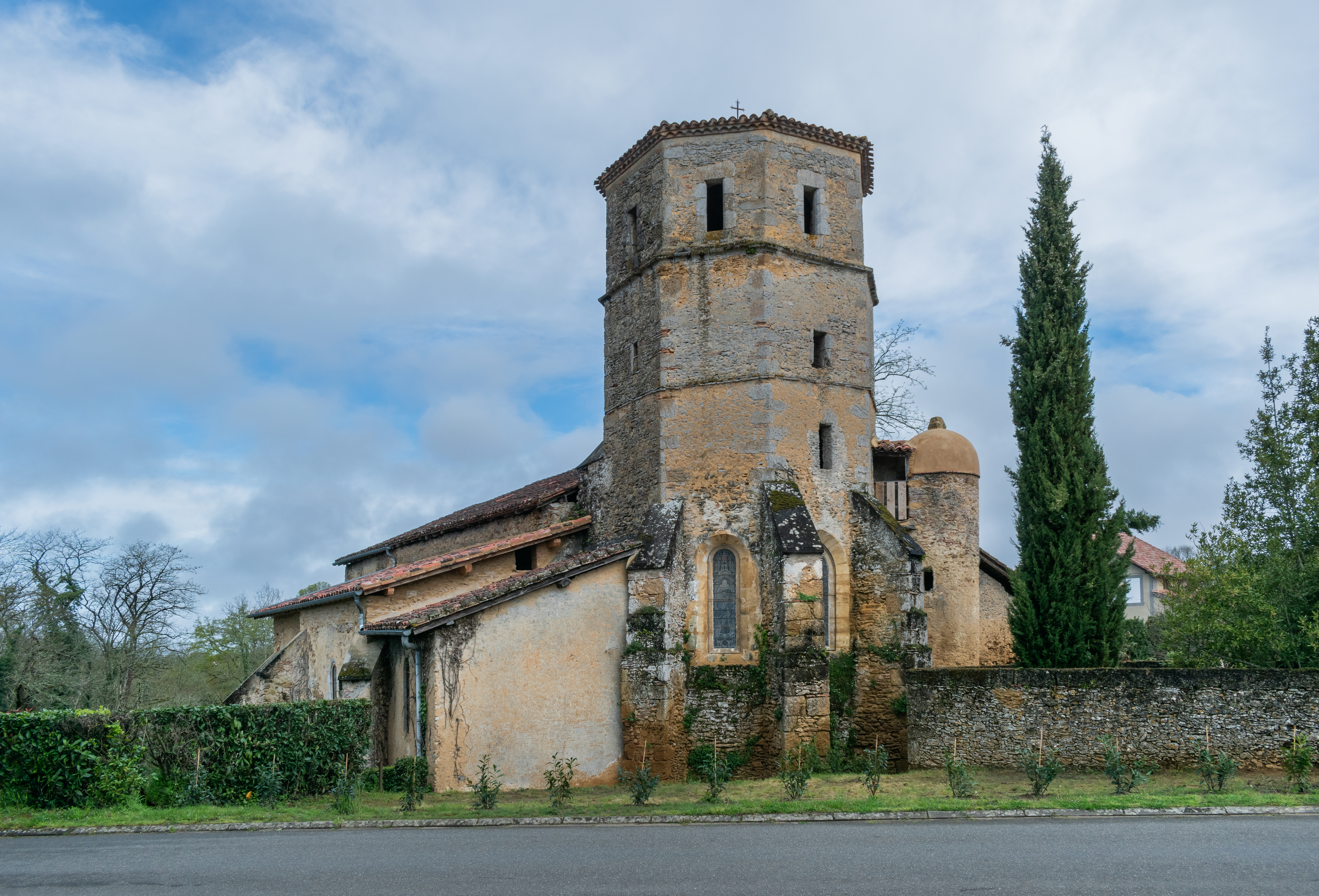
- Saint Magdalene church of Mauléon-d'Armagnac
- Location of Mauléon-d'Armagnac
- Location within France Location within Occitanie
- Coordinates: 43°54′13″N 0°09′08″W
- Country: France
- Region: Occitania
- Department: Gers
- Arrondissement: Condom
- Canton: Grand-Bas-Armagnac
- Intercommunality: Grand-Armagnac

Government
  - Mayor (2020–2026): Daniel Laburthe
- Area^{1}: 35.13 km^{2} (13.56 sq mi)
- Elevation: 93 m (305 ft)
- Highest elevation: 153 m (502 ft)
- Lowest elevation: 68 m (223 ft)
- Population (2023): 265
  - Density: 7.54/km^{2} (19.5/sq mi)
- Time zone: UTC+01:00 (CET)
  - Summer (DST): UTC+02:00 (CEST)
- INSEE/Postal code: 32243 /32240
- ^{1} French Land Register data, which excludes lakes, ponds, glaciers > 1 km^{2} (0.386 sq mi or 247 acres) and river estuaries.

Mauléon-d'Armagnac (French pronunciation: [moleɔ̃ daʁmaɲak], literally Mauléon of Armagnac; Gascon: Mauleon d'Armanhac) is a commune in the Gers department in southwestern France.

== Geography ==
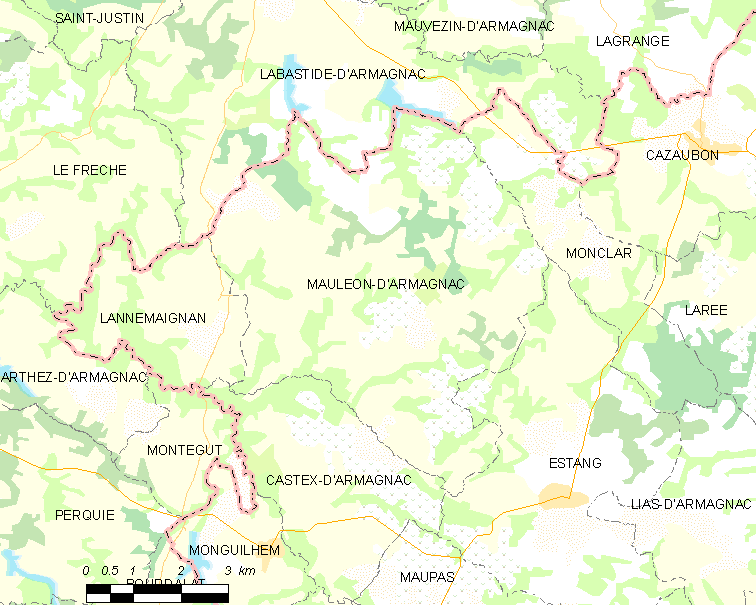
Mauléon-d'Armagnac and its surrounding communes

== Population ==
Historical population
Year	Pop.	±% p.a.
1968	523	—
1975	414	−3.28%
1982	369	−1.63%
1990	311	−2.11%
1999	306	−0.18%
2007	277	−1.24%
2012	280	+0.22%
2017	275	−0.36%
2023	265	−0.62%
Source: INSEE

== See also ==
- Communes of the Gers department
