= Warfare in Minoan Art =

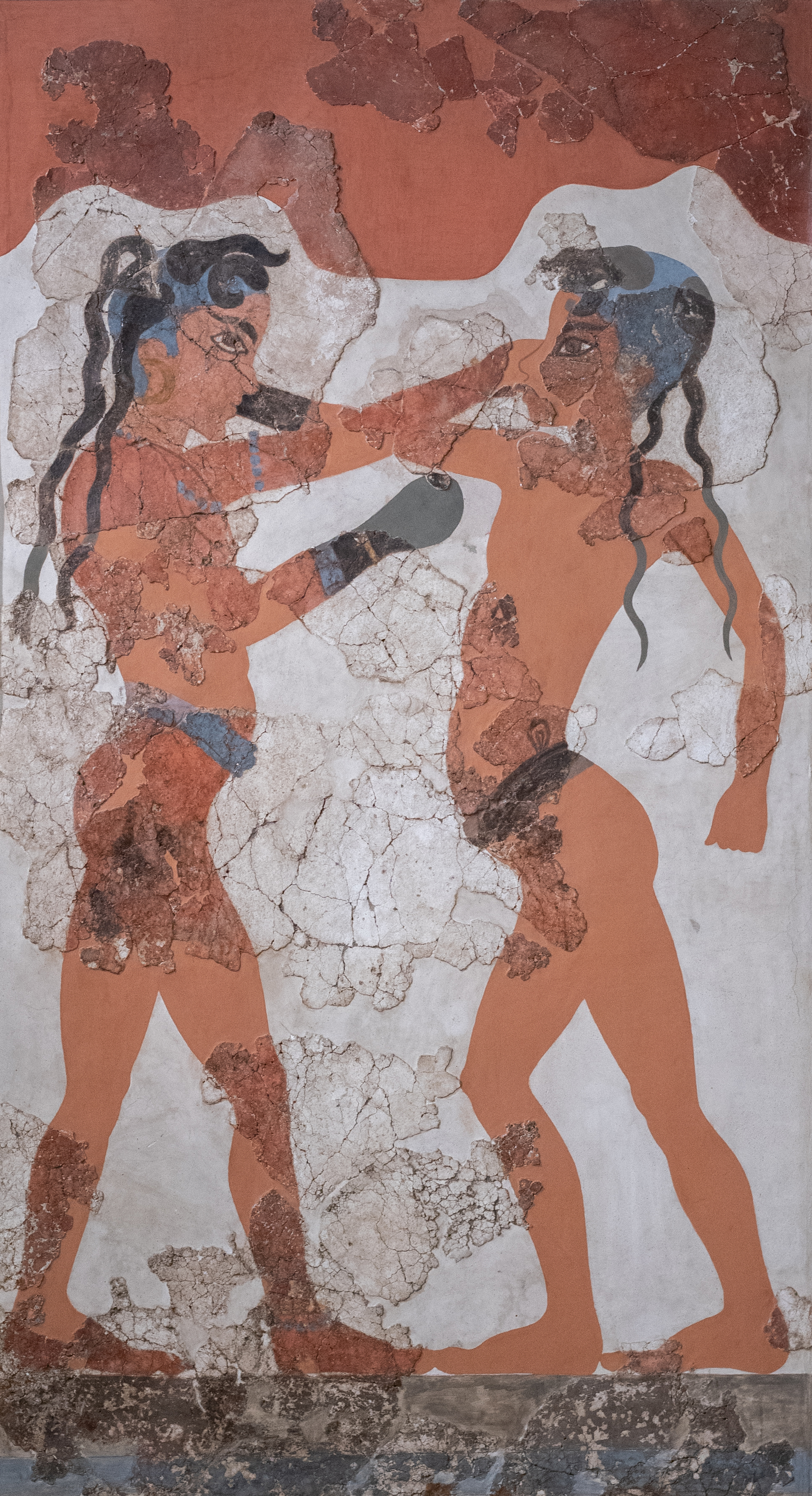
Two young boys boxing, which is one of a warrior's lifestyle.

The Minoan civilization in the Bronze Age (c. 3500–1100 B.C.E) was located on the island of Crete. Focusing on the palatial periods between c. 1900 and c. 1300 b.c. (Mid Bronze Age). Art that focuses on just scenes of war alone is impossible as there are many other references that can be made not relating to war at all. There are various meanings that can be interpreted from different perspectives and that is what Molloy wants readers to understand. There could be an overlap of religion, politics, social meanings added to an iconography of warfare. “Practitioners of violence” are called warriors, just an identity who performed their social acts depending on their society. These social acts ranges from bull-leaping, boxing, hunting, sports, combat, fighting and more. Malloy divides the art relating to warfare in Bronze Age Crete into four categories “glyptic art circulating in both social and administrative contexts; stone and ceramic portable art for repeated intimate consumption (dining/processions); coroplastic/bronze figural art for religious activity; and frescoes and relief mouldings fixed in architectural settings”.

== Seals ==
Seals are accessories worn by the person and these seals had images on them that could give information. One very popular scene is a man with a spear that is parallel to him vertically. The use of animal imagery, for example a lion showed could show internal traits such as bravery of the individual or the actual scene of killing/warfare. There are many variations of a man and a lion from scenes of lions hunting animals to man hunting the lions. Armors and weapons are also frequent in these seals and each can represent a symbol of some kind. For example, they can represent warfare and hunting, but also how the man is defending himself and his land.

== Frescoes ==
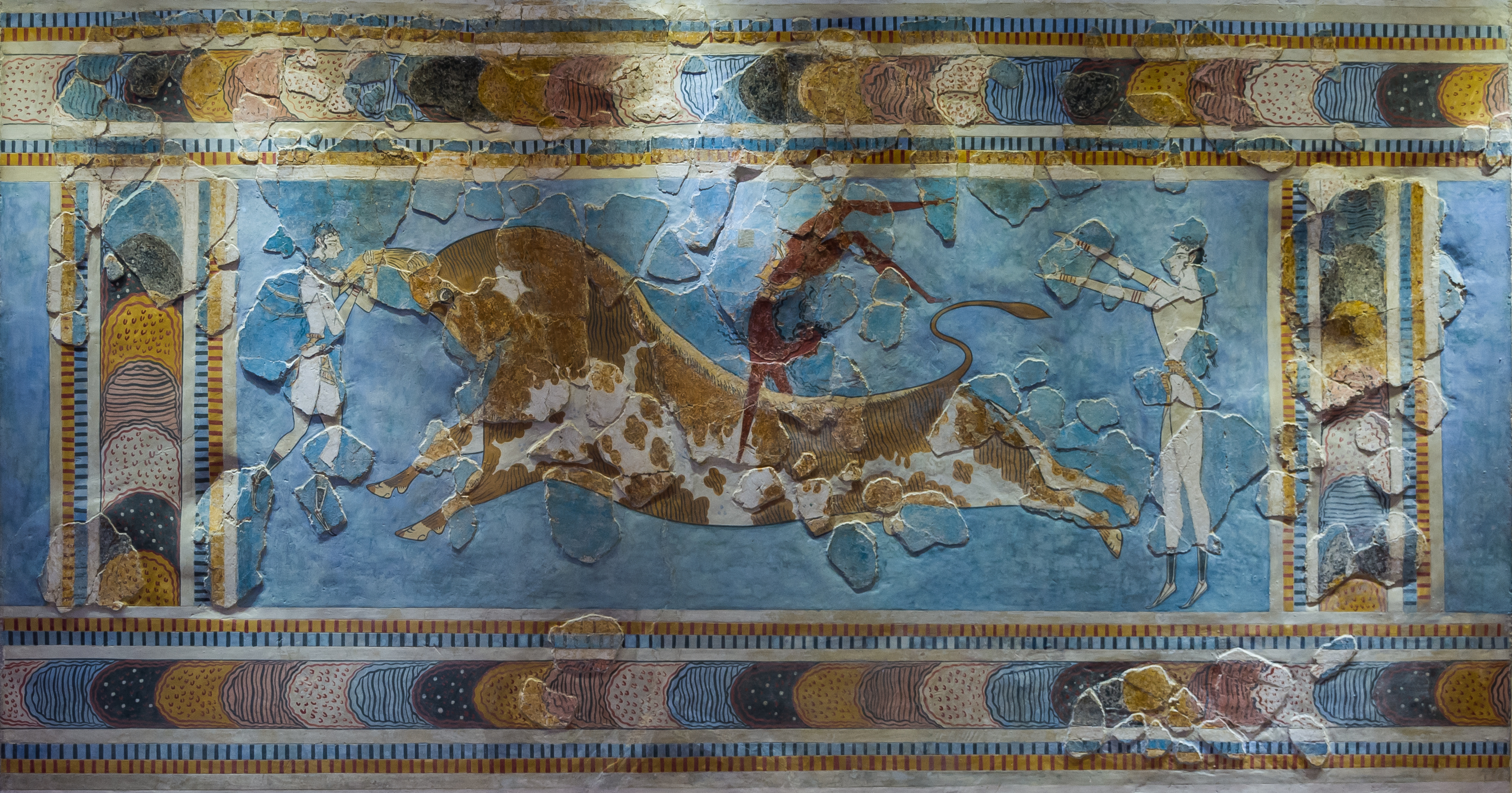
Bull leaping was an activity for warriors

Frescoes are bright wall paintings There were very few images of war in fresco art, however, the city of Knossos had many figural frescoes that could explain some form of war.

Bull leaping fresco from Knossos is the most well known piece of artwork. As mentioned above, bull leaping was a sort of activity Minoan men did as a past time and it showed the interaction between the bull and man.

=== Akrotiri ===
Akrotiri was a Minoan Bronze Age settlement on the island of Thera now known as Santorini. Here were found well kept frescoes that has survived through all the years.

=== Stone vessels ===
37 stone vessels talked about by Logue.

The Chieftain Cup from Aghia Triada features a tall male with a spear next to a shorter male with a sword, followed by three men with bull hides. These two armed figures of high status because of their weapons and their emphasis. The most vital of this piece is that the male body was carefully carved with incision as there are many details on the human body.

Boxer Rhyton from Aghia Triada also puts a great emphasis of the male body.
