= Minoan (disambiguation) =

Minoan may refer to the following:

- Minoan, having to do with King Minos
- Minoan civilization
  - Minoan, the script known as Linear A
    - the (undeciphered) Minoan language written in that script
      - the Eteocretan language, probably a descendant thereof
  - Minoan pottery
  - Minoan eruption
  - Minoan chronology
  - Minoan seal-stones
  - Minoan religion
  - Minoan Modi, a peak sanctuary in eastern Crete
  - Minoan Bull-leaper, a bronze in the British Museum
- Cypro-Minoan syllabary, a script used on Cyprus
- Minoan, an old name for the Mycenean language before it was deciphered and discovered to be a form of Greek
- Minoan frescoes from Tell el-Daba, ancient Egyptian frescos in Minoan style
- Minoa, name of several bronze-age settlements in the Aegean.
- Minoan Lines, a Greek ferry company
- Minoan Air, a Greek airline
