= Bull-leaping =

Form of non-violent bull fighting based on an ancient ritual

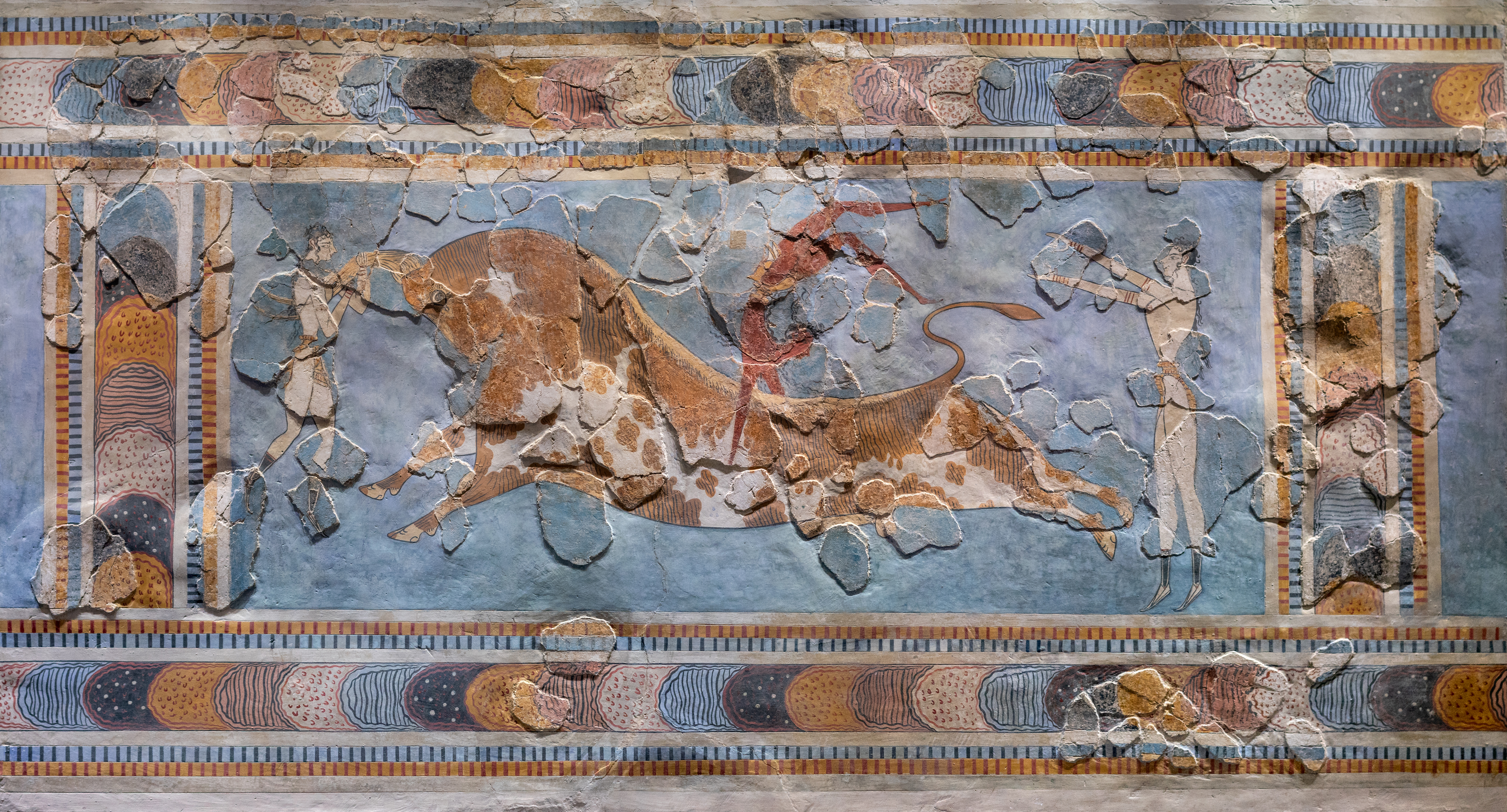
The Bull-Leaping Fresco from the Great Palace at Knossos, Crete

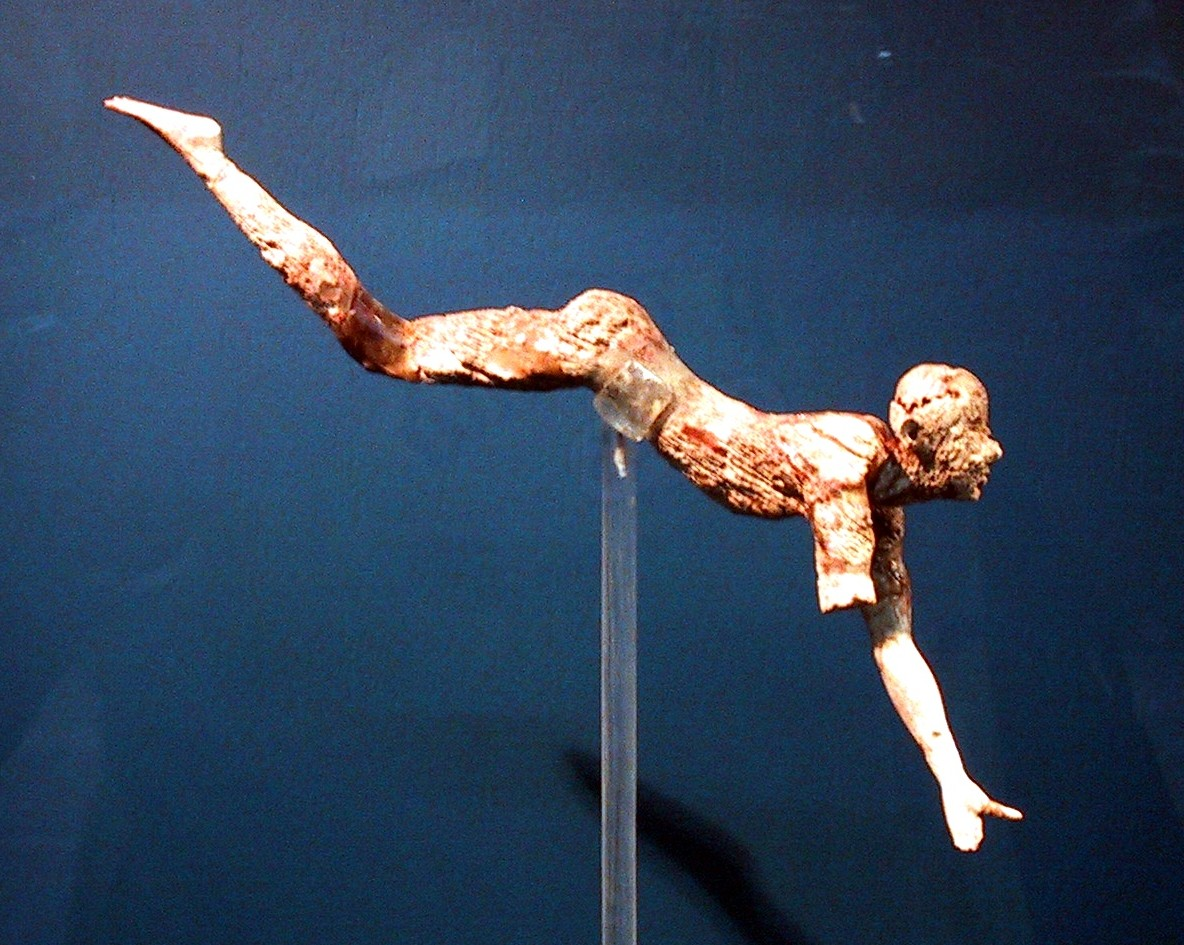
The bull-leaper, an ivory figurine from the palace of Knossos, Crete. The only complete surviving figure of a larger arrangement of figures. This is the earliest three dimensional representation of the bull leap. It is assumed that thin gold pins were used to suspend the figure over a bull.

Bull-leaping (Ancient Greek: ταυροκαθάψια, taurokathapsia) is a term for various types of non-violent bull fighting. Some are based on an ancient ritual from the Minoan civilization involving an acrobat leaping over the back of a charging bull (or cow). As a sport it survives in Spain, with bulls, as recortes; in modern France, usually with cows rather than bulls, as course landaise; and in Tamil Nadu, India with bulls as Jallikattu.

Ritual leaping over bulls is a motif in Middle Bronze Age figurative art, especially in Minoan art, and what are probably Minoan objects found in Mycenaean Greece, but it is also sometimes found in Hittite Anatolia, the Levant, Bactria and the Indus Valley. It is often interpreted as a depiction of a rite performed in connection with bull worship.

== Iconography ==
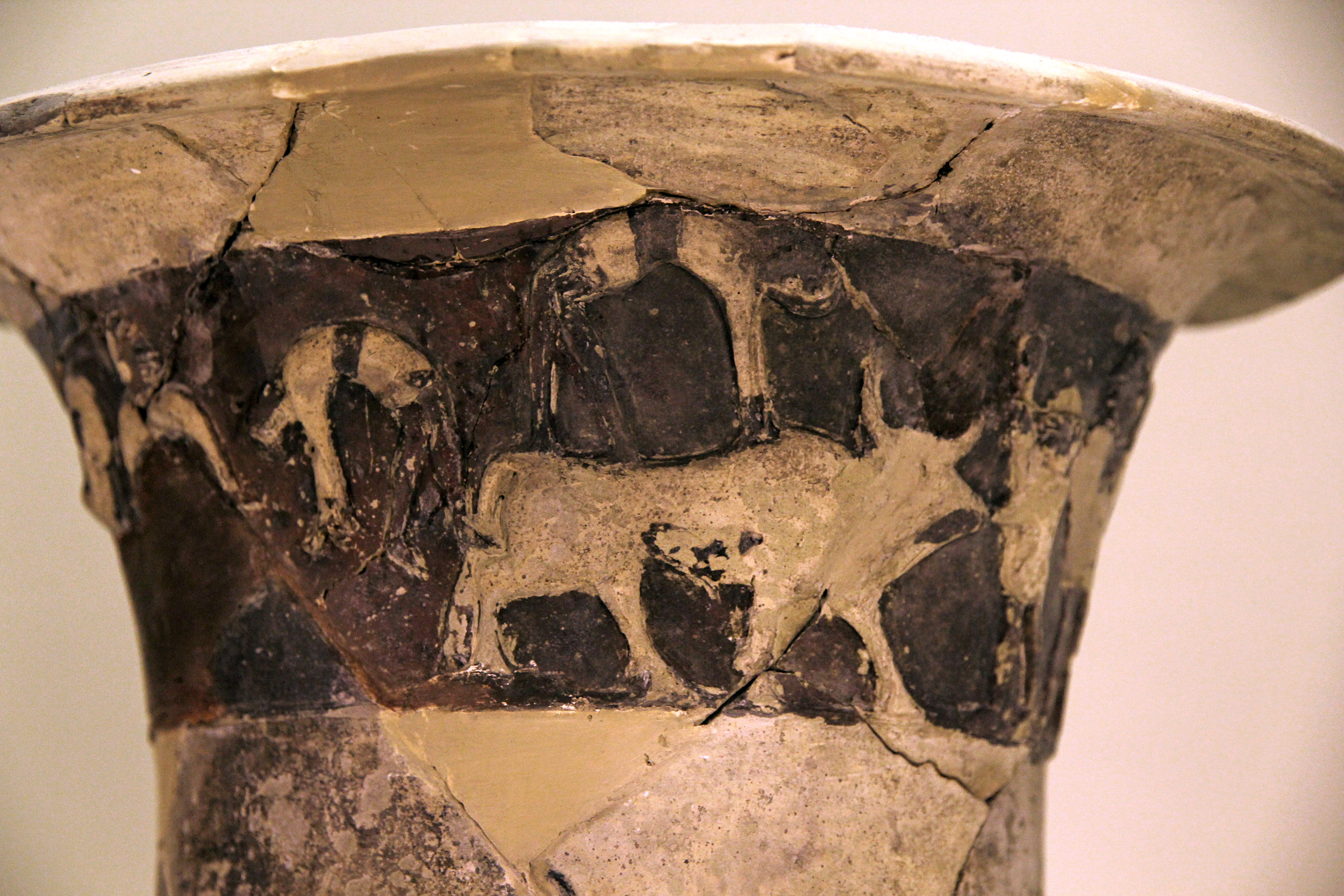
Bull-leaping scene in Hüseyindede vases belongs to Early Hittites, approximately 1650 BC.

Younger (1995) classifies bull-leaping depictions in Bronze Age Aegean art as follows:

- Type I: the acrobat approaches the bull from the front, grabs the horns, and somersaults backwards
- Type II: the acrobat approaches the bull from the front, dives over the horns without touching them and pushes himself with his hands from the bull's back into a backward somersault
- Type III: the acrobat is depicted in mid-air over the bull's back, facing the same way as the animal

The Type III depictions are often found in Late Minoan IIIB art (14th to 13th centuries BC). The Minoan frescoes from Tell el-Daba (Avaris, Egypt) dating to the 18th dynasty (16th to 14th centuries BC) show similar designs besides genuinely Egyptian motifs, for which reason they have often been ascribed to Minoan-taught Egyptian craftsmen rather than to Minoan ones directly, though this is disputed. They could also have been included as palace decorations because the palace was built for an Aegean princess diplomatically married to a Hyksos pharaoh.

Other examples of bull-leaping scenes have been found in Syria, such as a cylinder seal impression found in level VII at Alalakh (Old Babylonian period, 19th or 18th century BC) showing two acrobats performing handstands on the back of a bull, with an ankh sign placed between them, another seal belonging to a servant of Shamshi-Adad I (c. 1800 BC), besides other Syrian examples. Furthermore, a relief vase was discovered in Hüseyindede in 1997, dating to the Hittite Old Kingdom (18th to 15th centuries BC).

== Minoan Crete ==
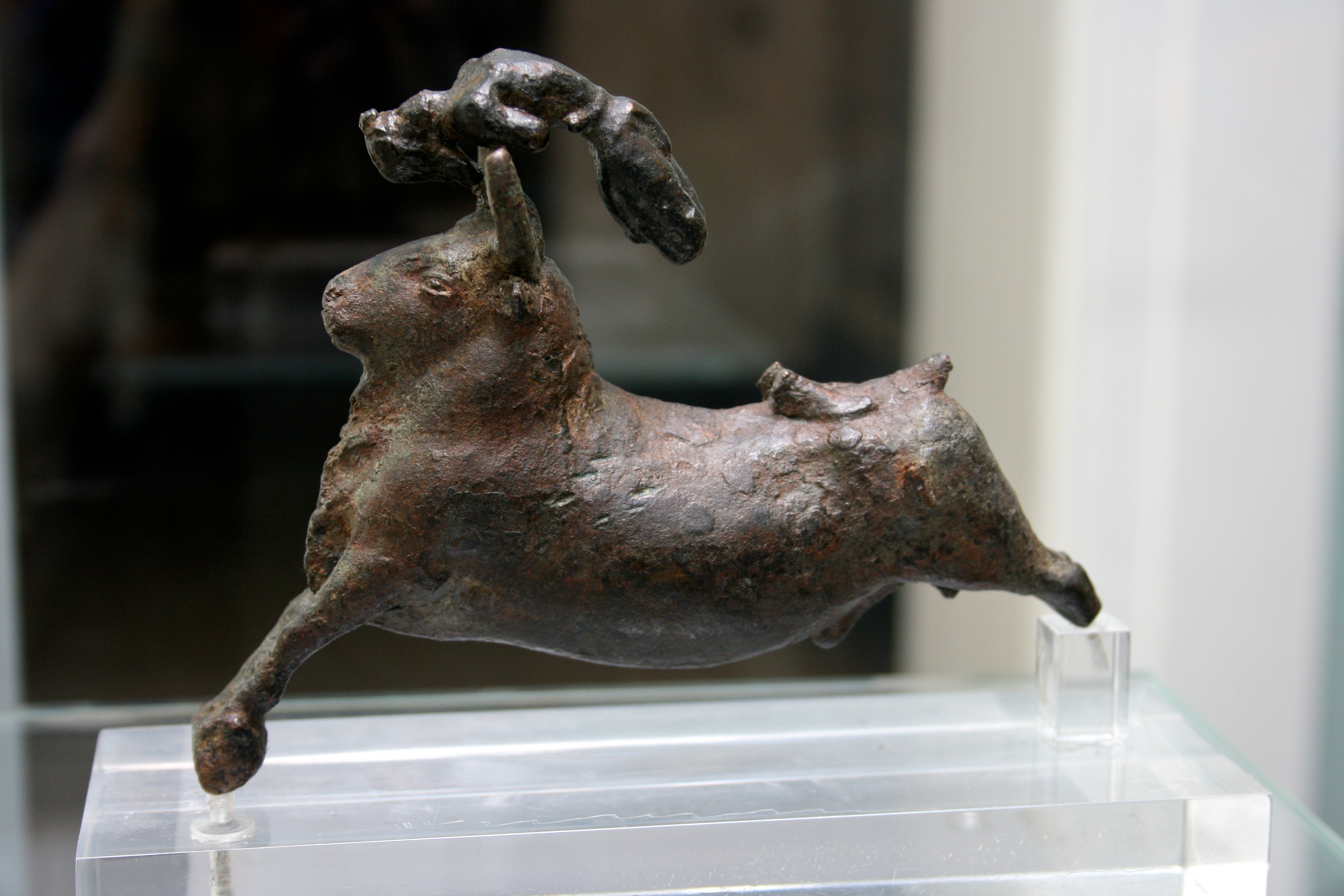
The Minoan Bull-leaper sculpture at the British Museum.

Bull-leaping is thought to have been a key ritual in the elite culture and perhaps Minoan religion of the Minoan civilization in Bronze Age Crete. As in the case of other Mediterranean civilizations, the bull was the subject of veneration and worship. Representation of the Bull at the palace of Knossos is a widespread symbol in the art and decoration of this archaeological site.

The assumption, widely debated by scholars, is that the iconography represents a ritual sport and/or performance in which human athletes—possibly both male and female—literally vaulted over bulls as part of a ceremonial rite. This ritual is hypothesized to have consisted of an acrobatic leap over a bull, such that when the leaper grasped the bull's horns, the bull would violently jerk its neck upwards, giving the leaper the momentum necessary to perform somersaults and other acrobatic tricks or stunts.

Barbara Olsen, associate professor of Greek and Roman Studies at Vassar College, adds that the sport was probably not especially dangerous for participants. "From the images it looks like they [leaped over the bulls] successfully—the Minoans tend not to give us too much violent imagery, so the bull-leaping usually ends pretty well," but the goring scene on the "boxer's rhyton" found in Hagia Triada suggests that injuries were not unknown.

== Contemporary bull-leaping ==
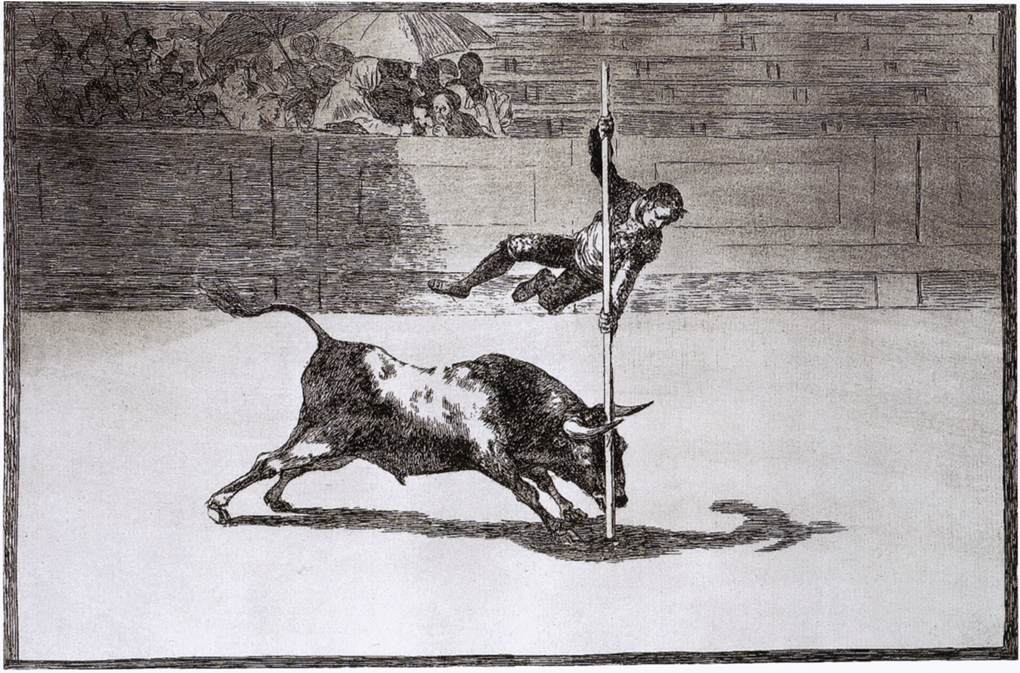
The Speed and Daring of Juanito Apiñani in the Ring of Madrid (1815-16). Etching and aquatint by Francisco de Goya.

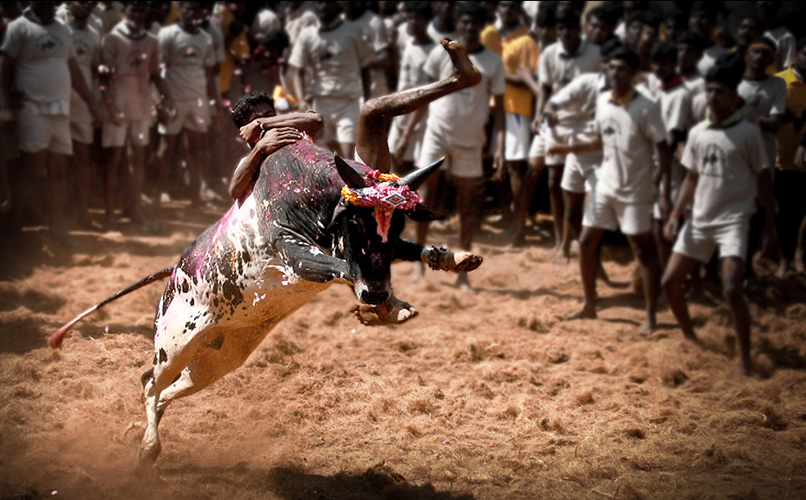
A youth trying to take control of a bull in jallikattu at Alanganallur.

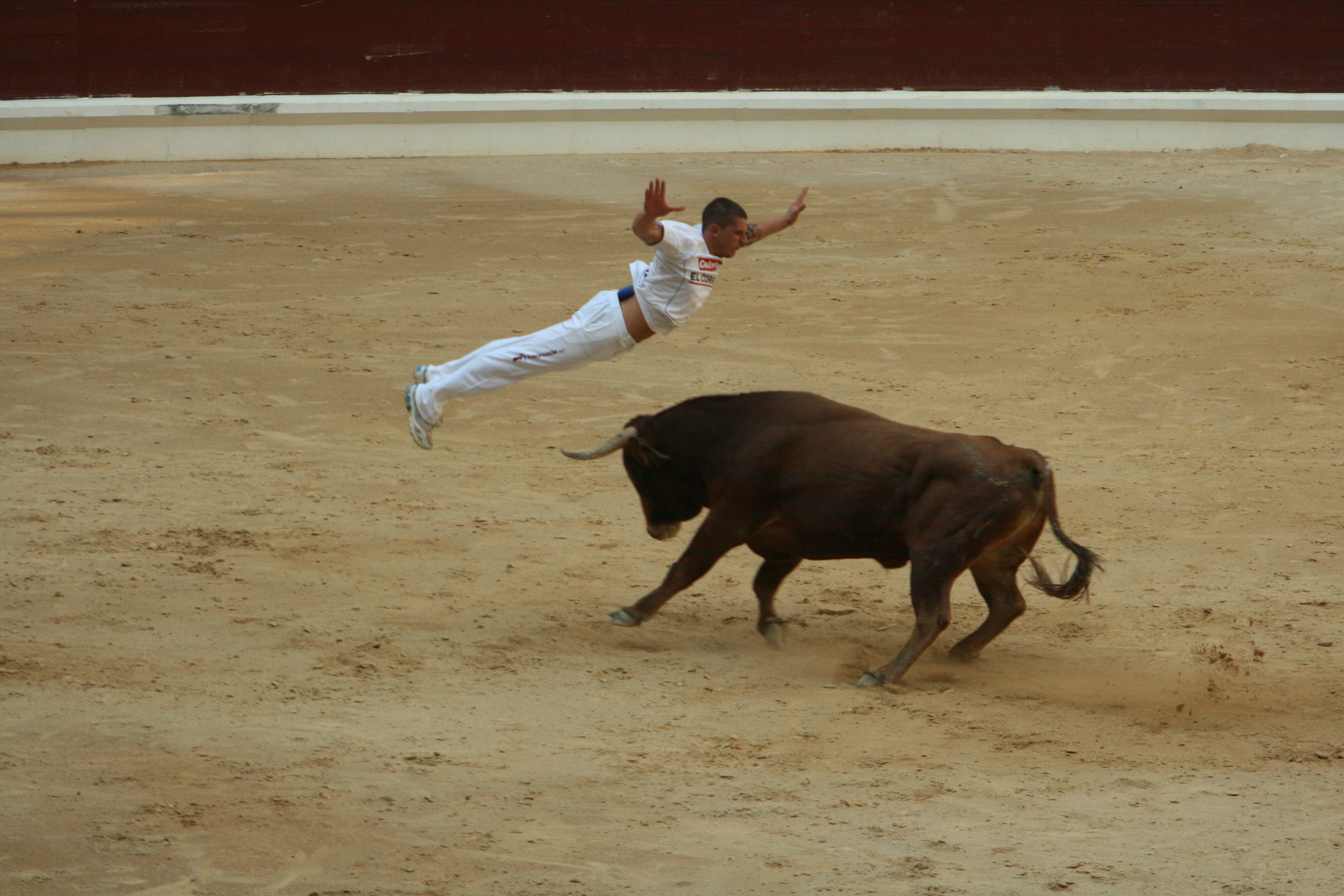
A "leaper" in 2008

Bull-leaping is still practiced in southwestern France, where it is traditionally known as the course landaise, although usually aggressive cows are used instead of bulls. They are the female stock of the fighting bulls bred for the corrida in Spain. However, once per year bulls are used, in the Festival of Art and Courage. The town of Mont-de-Marsan in Gascony is renowned for its fine sauteurs or 'leapers' and écarteurs ('dodgers') dressed in brocaded waistcoats. They compete in teams, attempting to use their repertoire evasions and acrobatic leaps to avoid the cow's charges.

The cow is typically guided by the use of a long rope attached to its horns, so that it runs directly at the performers and is restrained from trampling or goring them should they miss a trick. Although there is little to no risk to the cow in this form of contest, it is a highly dangerous sport for the human participants; a prominent competitor from Montois, Jean-Pierre Rachou, was killed in 2001 when he fell on his head after being hit by a cow.

The courses landaises are held from March to October on the occasion of festivals in many cities and villages, including Nogaro, Mont-de-Marsan, Dax, Castelnau-d'Auzan, and many other places. There are also national championships.

Bull-leaping is also practised in Tamil Nadu state of India by the Tamil people, and is called jallikattu, sallikkattu, eru thazhuvuthal and manju virattu. It is a traditional spectacle in which a bull, such as the Pulikulam or Kangayam breeds, is released into a crowd of people, and multiple human participants attempt to grab the large hump on the bull's back with both arms and hang on to it while the bull attempts to escape. Participants hold the hump for as long as possible, attempting to bring the bull to a stop. In some cases, participants must ride long enough to remove flags on the bull's horns.

Jallikattu is typically practised in the Indian state of Tamil Nadu as a part of Pongal celebrations on Mattu Pongal day, which occurs annually in January.

As there were incidents of injury and death associated with the sport, both to the participants and to the animals forced into it, animal rights organizations have called for a ban to the sport, resulting in the Supreme Court banning it several times over the past years. However, with protest from the people against the ban, a new ordinance was made in 2017 to continue the sport.

A similar but even more dangerous tradition of non-violent bull-leaping, Recortes is practiced in some parts of Spain. Specialist toreros (bullfighters), known as recortadores, compete at dodging and leaping over bulls without the use of the cape or sword. Some recortadores use a long pole to literally pole-vault over the charging animal, which is both larger than the type used in the French sport, and unrestrained by any guiding rope or similar safety device.

== See also ==
- Bull-baiting
- Bullfighting
- Bull running
- Running of the bulls

== Bibliography ==
- Collon, D.; "Bull-Leaping in Syria"; International Journal for Egyptian Archaeology and Related Disciplines 4 (1994); pp. 81–88.
- McInerney, J.; "Bulls and Bull-leaping in the Minoan World"; Expedition Magazine 53:3 (December 2011).
- Marinatos, Nanno; "The Export Significance of Minoan Bull-leaping Scenes"; International Journal for Egyptian Archaeology and Related Disciplines 4 (1994); pp. 89–93.
- Marinatos, Nannó; "Minoan Religion: Ritual, Image, and Symbol"; Studies in Comparative Religion; Columbia, South Carolina: University of South Carolina Press, 1993.
- Shaw, Maria C.; "The bull-leaping fresco from below the Ramp House at Mycenae: a study in iconography and artistic transmission"; The Annual of the British School at Athens 91 (1996); pp. 167–190
- Sipahi, Tunç; "New Evidence From Anatolia Regarding Bull Leaping Scenes in the Art of the Aegean and the Near East"; Anatolica 27 (2001); pp. 107–125.
- Younger, J.; "Bronze Age Representations of Aegean Bull-Games, III"; Aegaeum 12 (1995); pp. 507–46, PDF.
