= Castelnau-d'Auzan-Labarrère =

- Commune
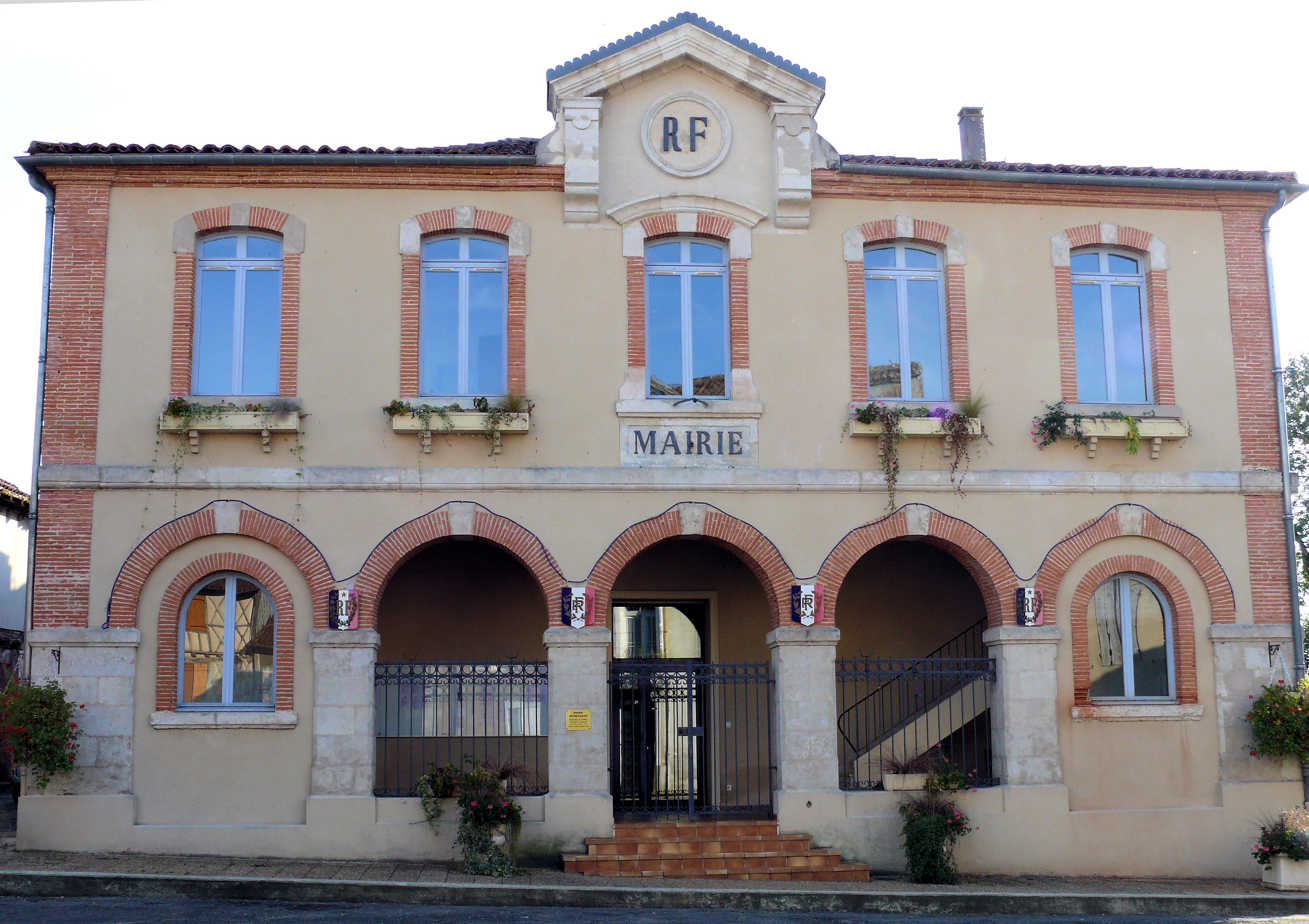
- The town hall in Castelnau-d'Auzan
- Location of Castelnau-d'Auzan-Labarrère
- Location within France Location within Occitanie
- Coordinates: 43°56′56″N 0°05′06″E
- Country: France
- Region: Occitania
- Department: Gers
- Arrondissement: Condom
- Canton: Armagnac-Ténarèze

Government
  - Mayor (2020–2026): Philippe Beyries
- Area^{1}: 56.78 km^{2} (21.92 sq mi)
- Population (2023): 1,187
  - Density: 20.91/km^{2} (54.14/sq mi)
- Time zone: UTC+01:00 (CET)
  - Summer (DST): UTC+02:00 (CEST)
- INSEE/Postal code: 32079 /32250, 32440
- ^{1} French Land Register data, which excludes lakes, ponds, glaciers > 1 km^{2} (0.386 sq mi or 247 acres) and river estuaries.

Castelnau-d'Auzan-Labarrère (French pronunciation: [kastɛlno dozan labaʁɛʁ]; Occitan: Castèthnau d'Eusan e La Barrèra) is a commune in the Gers department of southwestern France. The municipality was established on 1 January 2016 and consists of the former communes of Castelnau-d'Auzan and Labarrère.

== Geography ==
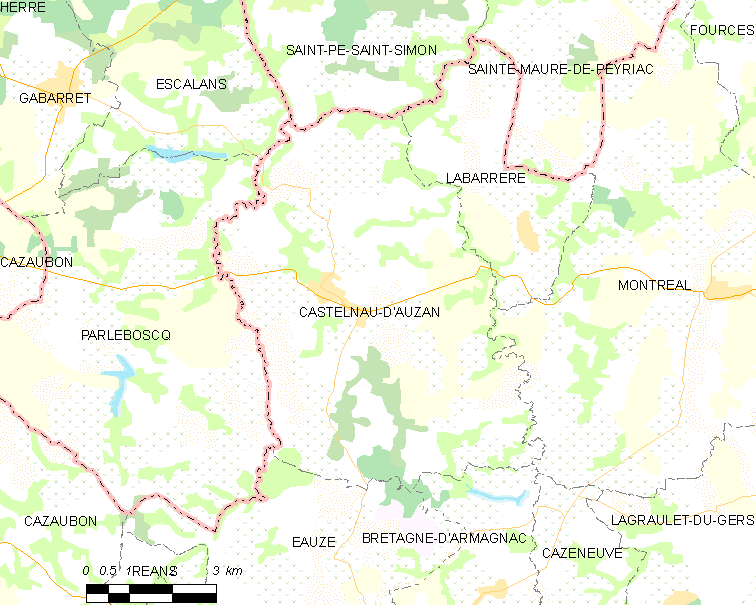
Castelnau-d'Auzan-Labarrère and its surrounding communes

== Population ==
The population data given in the table and graph below for 2012 and earlier refer to the former communes of Castelnau-d'Auzan and Labarrère combined.

Historical population
Year	Pop.	±% p.a.
1968	1,614	—
1975	1,486	−1.17%
1982	1,360	−1.26%
1990	1,311	−0.46%
1999	1,286	−0.21%
2007	1,325	+0.37%
2012	1,270	−0.84%
2017	1,252	−0.29%
2023	1,187	−0.88%
Source: INSEE

== See also ==
- Communes of the Gers department
