= Castelnau-d'Auzan =

Commune in Gers, France

- Part of Castelnau-d'Auzan-Labarrère
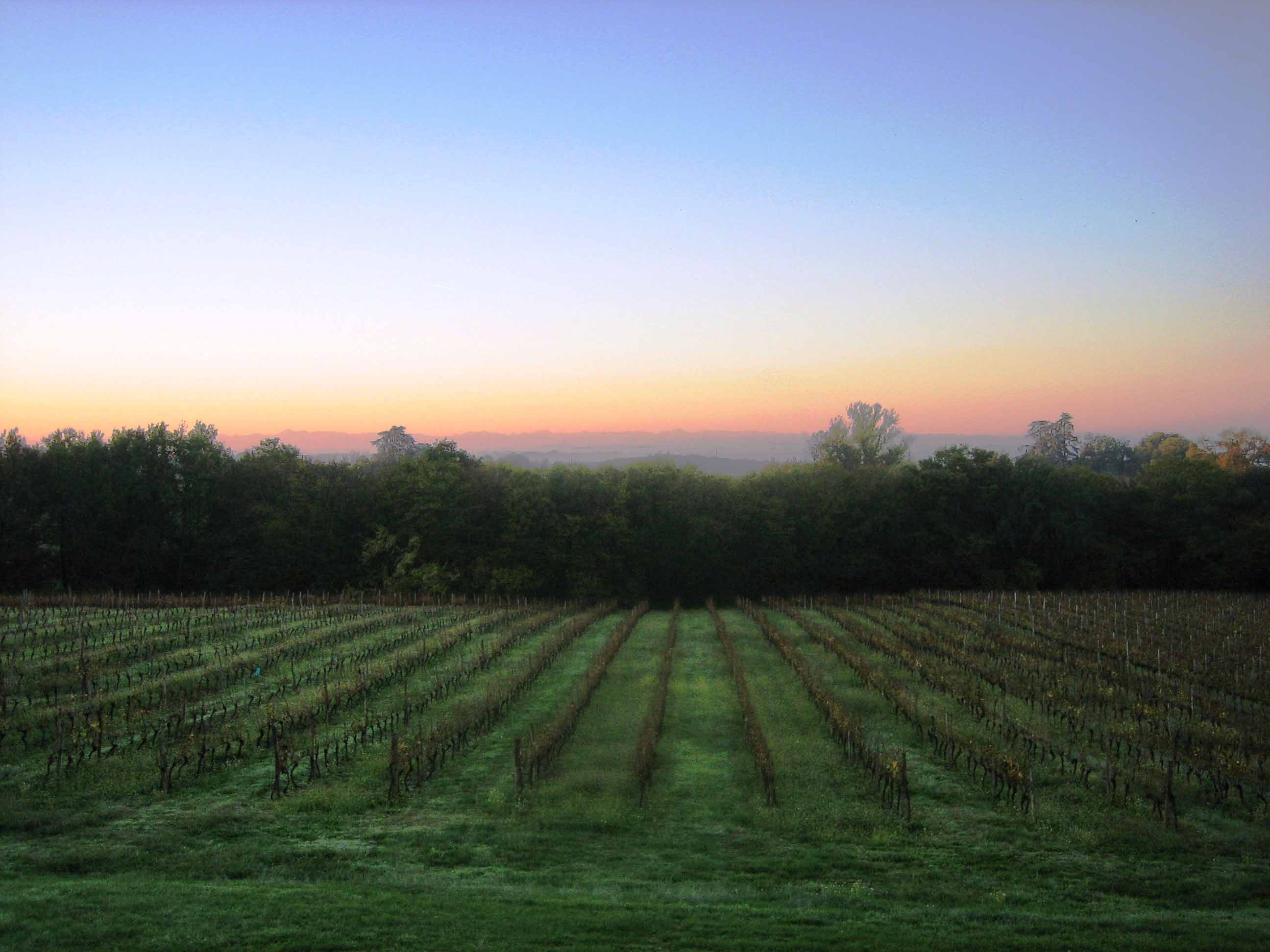
- Vineyards

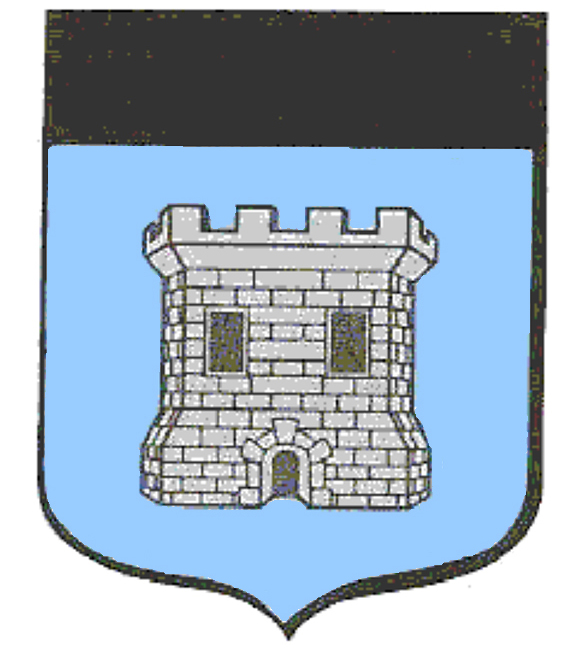
- Coat of arms
- Location of Castelnau-d'Auzan
- Location within France Location within Occitanie
- Coordinates: 43°56′56″N 0°05′10″E
- Country: France
- Region: Occitania
- Department: Gers
- Arrondissement: Condom
- Canton: Montréal
- Commune: Castelnau-d'Auzan-Labarrère
- Area^{1}: 43.79 km^{2} (16.91 sq mi)
- Elevation: 203 m (666 ft)
- Highest elevation: 186 m (610 ft)
- Lowest elevation: 82 m (269 ft)
- Population (2013): 1,047
  - Density: 23.91/km^{2} (61.93/sq mi)
- Time zone: UTC+01:00 (CET)
  - Summer (DST): UTC+02:00 (CEST)
- Postal code: 32440
- ^{1} French Land Register data, which excludes lakes, ponds, glaciers > 1 km^{2} (0.386 sq mi or 247 acres) and river estuaries.

Castelnau-d'Auzan (French pronunciation: [kastɛlno dozan]; Gascon: Castèthnau d'Eusan) is a former commune in the Gers department in southwestern France. On 1 January 2016, it was merged into the new commune Castelnau-d'Auzan-Labarrère.

== Geography ==
A picturesque little village on the river Gélise on a crossing of roads, 26 km (16 mi) east of the city of Condom in the Gers bounding the departments Lot-et-Garonne and the Landes. It is located on the fringe of the Landes forest in the middle of a fertile region. The village lies on the water parting between the Gélise and the Izaute and occupies the emplacement of an ancient castle.

The geographical situation is agreeable: the Atlantic coast on one side and on the other side the ski resorts of the south of France are by car only a distance of 145 km (2 h 15 min).

== History ==
The name Castelnau d'Auzan means: "Château Neuf in the land of Éauzan". The castle disappeared, but here and there in the village some remains are still visible.

== Sights ==
- Town hall.
- The arena for the course Landaise.
- Leisure area and its lake.
- Old Armagnac caves.
- Église Sainte Marie-Madeleine:
  - In the centre of Castelnau, a neo Gothic church from the nineteenth century.
- Église Saint Jean de Béziey:
  - A country side church from the eleventh century, well known by its miraculous source believed to cure illnesses of the eyes.
- Église Saint Martin d'Arèch:
  - From the fifteenth century with a particular cylindrical bell-tower.
- Église de Rieupeyroux:
  - A church in the countryside in the centre of Houeillères with a particular forged iron cross.
- Notre-Dame de Pibèque:
  - A regional pilgrimage centre with a miraculous source. The splendid little church is a jewel and dates from the fifteenth century.

== Population ==
Historical population
Year	Pop.	±% p.a.
1962	1,295	—
1968	1,291	−0.05%
1975	1,207	−0.96%
1982	1,109	−1.20%
1990	1,062	−0.54%
1999	1,036	−0.28%
2006	1,085	+0.66%
2013	1,047	−0.51%
Source: EHESS and INSEE

The inhabitants are called Auzanais in French. Like many other communes in rural France Castelnau-d'Auzan had a decrease of population. Between 1962 and 1999, the population decreased 20%.

This phenomenon started, as in many other rural areas during the War of 1914-1918. Many young men did not return home. Lack of manpower changed the once wealthy and healthy pastoral area in a region where the population and wealth both decreased. New immigrants from Spain and Italy compensated partly the loss in population.

After the independence of Algeria, the French farmers and winemakers returning to France were encouraged to settle in the Gers.

All these waves of immigrants now are completely integrated.

Due to the changes in the rural economics the last decade agricultural land and farms were put on the market and sold to newcomers from the north of Europe, looking for an active countryside way of life.

Gradually immigration changed, nowadays retired people from the north European urban areas come to the Gers in search of homes for their retirement.

== Features ==
Castelnau-d'Auzan is surrounded by vineyards, undulating hills and other villages. Nearby is the Golf de Guinlet, which is on five minutes distance of the village.

Because of its landscapes the Gers is now and then called the "Tuscany of France". The summers are long and warm; the winters are warm and short. In the neighborhood are numerous old castles, little medieval walled villages, small cities built around castles and "sacred" places, because the Way of St. James of Compostela and the Via Podiensis are going through the Gers and left their traces.

== Tourism and culture ==
Local associations develop numerous activities and places to see which include; the natural habitat, walking and bicycling routes, traditional skittle and ball games (quilles au maillet) and palet gascon; courses Landaises a game with wild cows; old fashioned battue hunting; local feasts; and gastronomy.

== Events ==
- Easter Monday: attic, antique and garage sale with course Landaise.
- The before last weekend of July: local feasts with village dinners in the open air, attic sales and time-honoured skittle and ball games
- First weekend of August: feast in Arèch with open air dinner and ball and numerous attractions.
- Third weekend of August: feast in Houeillères with open air dinner and ball and numerous attractions.

== Personalities ==
- Joseph Nicolas Barbeau Barran was a delegate in the National Convention and the Chambre des Cent Jours, born in Castelnau-d'Auzan in 1761, he died in 1816 in Switzerland. At the trial of Louis XVI he voted guilty and for the death penalty. He was President of the Jacobin Club and an antagonist of Maximilien Robespierre. At the second Restoration in 1816 he was, because of the assassination of the king, condemned to exile and he went to Switzerland.
- General Henri de Mibielle was born in Castelnau d'Auzan in 1841, died in 1910; his tomb is on the cemetery of Béziey.

== Transportation ==
The village can easily be reached by car or train. Nearby rail stations are: Mont-de-Marsan (55 km - 1h00m), Agen (65 km - 1h05m) and Auch (70 km - 1h05m).

Three airports are in the neighbourhood: Toulouse (140 km - 2h10m), Bordeaux (150 km -1h50m) and Pau (100 km - 1h40m).

== See also ==
- Communes of the Gers department
