= Labarrère =

Commune in Gers, France

- Part of Castelnau-d'Auzan-Labarrère
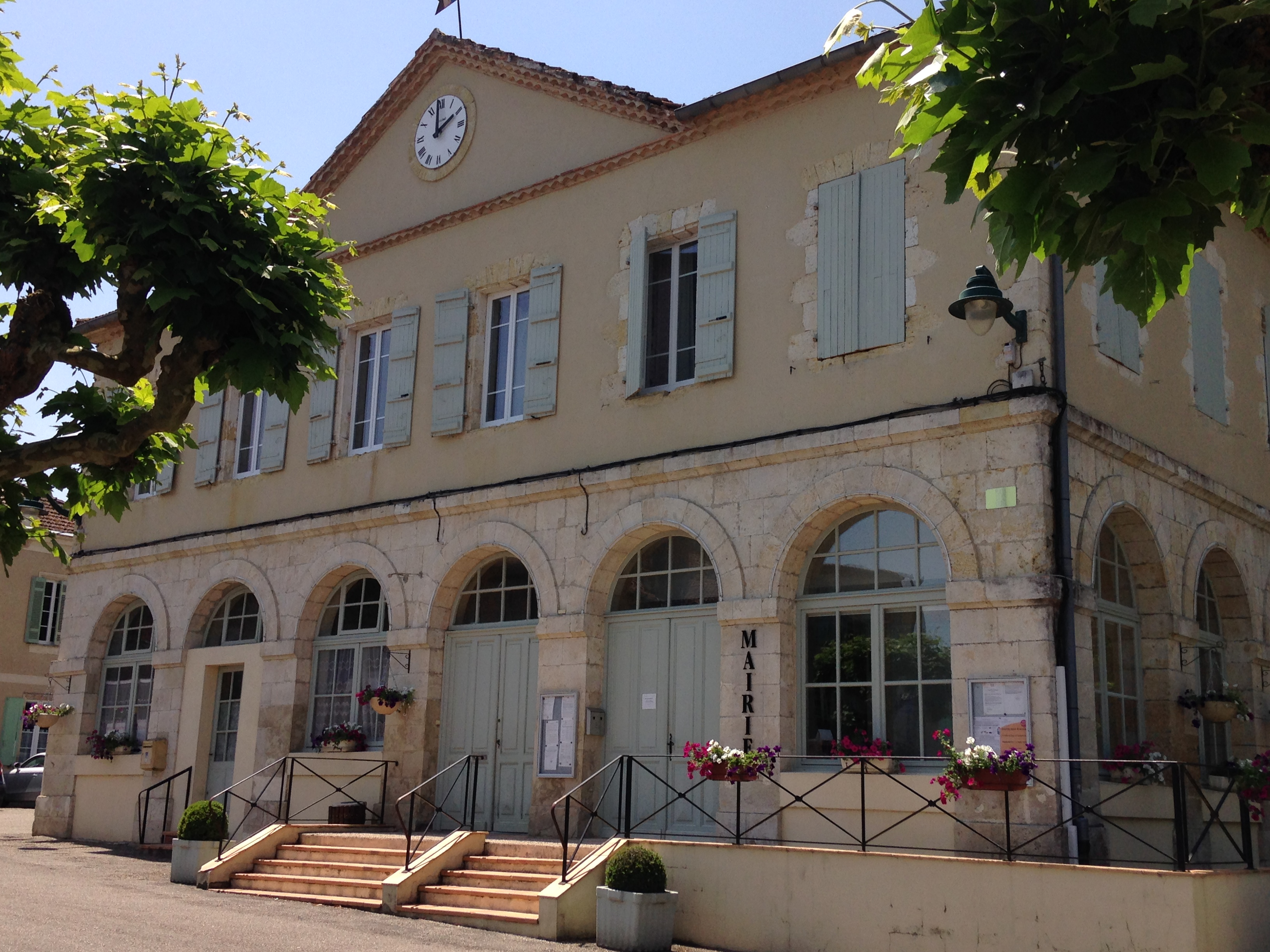
- Town hall
- Location of Labarrère
- Location within France Location within Occitanie
- Coordinates: 43°57′38″N 0°08′49″E
- Country: France
- Region: Occitania
- Department: Gers
- Arrondissement: Condom
- Canton: Montréal
- Commune: Castelnau-d'Auzan-Labarrère
- Area^{1}: 12.99 km^{2} (5.02 sq mi)
- Elevation: 156 m (512 ft)
- Highest elevation: 181 m (594 ft)
- Lowest elevation: 77 m (253 ft)
- Population (2023): 188
  - Density: 14.5/km^{2} (37.5/sq mi)
- Time zone: UTC+01:00 (CET)
  - Summer (DST): UTC+02:00 (CEST)
- Postal code: 32250
- ^{1} French Land Register data, which excludes lakes, ponds, glaciers > 1 km^{2} (0.386 sq mi or 247 acres) and river estuaries.

Labarrère (French pronunciation: [labaʁɛʁ]; Gascon: La Barrèra) is a former commune in the Gers department in southwestern France. On 1 January 2016, it was merged into the new commune Castelnau-d'Auzan-Labarrère.

== See also ==
- Communes of the Gers department
