= Minoan Bull-leaper =

Sculpture in the British Museum

Bronze Group of a Bull and Acrobat
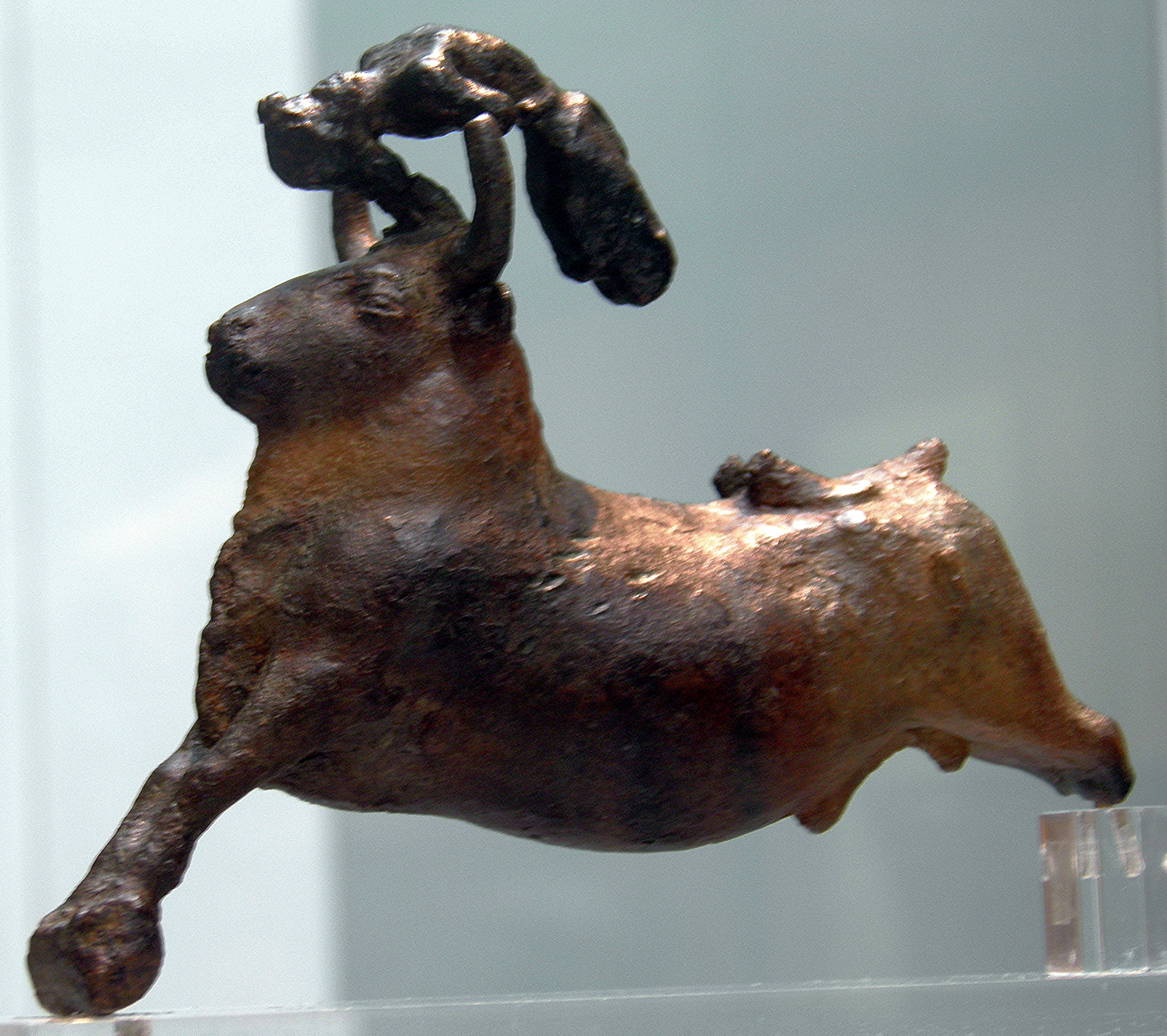
- Material: Bronze
- Size: L: 15.5 centimetres (6.1 in); H: 11.4 centimetres (4.5 in); W: 4.7 centimetres (1.9 in)
- Created: 1600BC-1450BC
- Period/culture: Late Minoan I
- Place: Rethymnon, Crete
- Present location: G12/1, British Museum, London
- Registration: 1966,0328.1

The Minoan bull leaper is a bronze group of a bull and leaper in the British Museum. It is the only known largely complete three-dimensional sculpture depicting Minoan bull-leaping. Although bull leaping certainly took place in Crete at this time, the leap depicted is practically impossible and it has therefore been speculated that the sculpture may be an exaggerated depiction. This speculation has been backed up by the testaments of modern-day bull leapers from France and Spain.

== Description ==
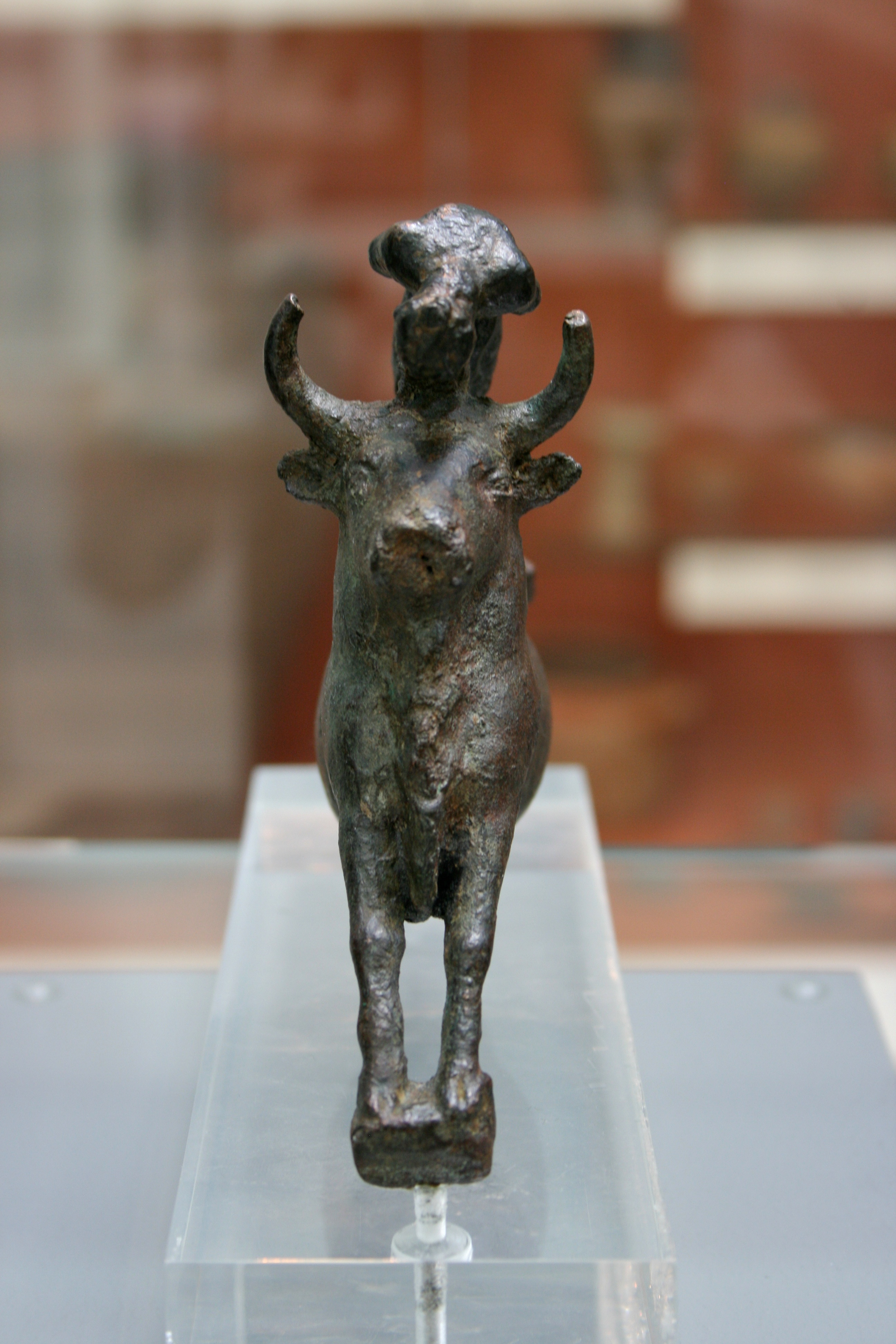
The Minoan bull leaper from the front.

The group was cast in a single mould using the lost-wax casting technique. The group's homogeneity was demonstrated by analysing the composition of the bronze of bull and leaper: both contain about 96% copper and 1.5% tin, with 1% zinc. The low proportion of tin in the alloy would have made it difficult for the bronze to fill the mould, resulting in the missing lower legs of the leaper, and probably the arms. Stylistically, the group is coherent, since the arched back of the leaper mirrors the flying gallop posture of the bull.

== Background ==
Arthur Evans, the excavator of Knossos, first published this object in the Journal of Hellenic Studies. Evans dated the bull-leaper to the Late Minoan I period, so that this object dates to approximately 1600 BC.

It was acquired by the British Museum in 1966 as part of the collection of Captain Edward George Spencer-Churchill (1876–1964). He acquired it in Crete in 1921. The object was widely known before its acquisition and display in the Museum. It was illustrated in several general books and exhibited at the British Academy in 1936.

== Bull-leaping ==
Bull leaping and bulls in general are believed to have been an important part of Minoan culture; excavations at Knossos have revealed several frescos depicting bull-leaping. It has been suggested bulls may have had some religious significance to them for example the large, exaggerated size of the bull compared to the human leaper may give an idea of the Minoans' reverence for the power of the animals.

This object has been central to discussions of bull-leaping, since Arthur Evans used it as the basis for his reconstruction of the mechanics of the leap: the leaper grabs the bull's horns, executes a back flip onto the bull's back and then dismounts. As John Younger has pointed out, although this reconstruction has become part of bull-leaping in the popular imagination, comparatively few Minoan depictions show exactly this schema. The majority show the leaper diving over the bull's horns onto the back.

== Media appearances ==
The bull-leaper was object 18 in the BBC Radio 4 Series A History of the World in 100 Objects. Week 4 of the series was 'The Beginning of Science and Literature': Neil MacGregor emphasised the importance of bronze, used to manufacture tools as well as art objects, and its central role in Mediterranean trade in the Bronze Age.

The BBC promoted A History of the World in 100 Objects with television adverts. One of these was a 30-second commercial featuring a Spanish recortador (bull-leaper) created by the ad agency Fallon Worldwide.

== See also ==
- Bull-Leaping Fresco

== Notes ==
Preceded by 17: Rhind Mathematical Papyrus	A History of the World in 100 Objects; Object 18	Succeeded by 19: Mold cape
