= Minoan frescoes from Tell el-Dab'a =

Ancient Egyptian frescos in Minoan style

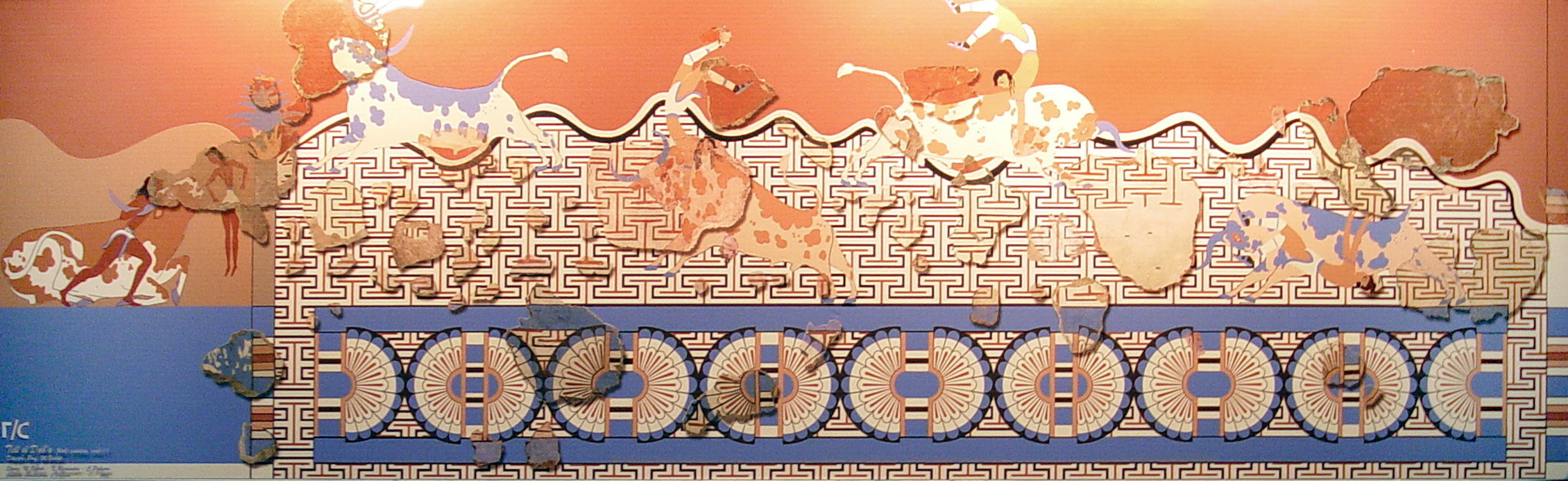
- Reconstructed Minoan Fresco from Tell El-Dab'a
- Material: Lime plaster
- Created: c. 1450 BC
- Present location: Sharqia, Egypt

The Minoan wall paintings at Tell el-Dab'a (ancient Avaris) are of particular interest to Egyptologists and archaeologists. They are of Minoan style, content, and technology, but there is uncertainty over the ethnic identity of the artists. The paintings depict images of bull-leaping, bull-grappling, griffins, and hunts. They were discovered by a team of archaeologists led by Manfred Bietak, in the palace district of the Thutmosid period at Tell el-Dab'a. The frescoes date to the Eighteenth dynasty of Egypt, most likely during the reigns of either the pharaohs Hatshepsut (reigned c. 1479 – 1458 BCE) or Thutmose III (reigned 1479 – 1425 BCE), after being previously considered to belong to the late Second Intermediate Period. The paintings indicate an involvement of Egypt in international relations and cultural exchanges with the Eastern Mediterranean either through marriage or exchange of gifts.

== Palace district of the Thutmosid period ==
The palace district of the Thutmosid period covers a part of the same ground that the palace district of the Hyksos period, however Thutmosid palace has a different orientation. The most prominent elements are two palatial structures, (F) which is smaller and (G) which is bigger. There was much pottery discovered in structure F that has been dated to the pharaoh Thutmose III. This has greatly aided archaeologists in dating the palace districts and the paintings. Also, two-thirds of the painting fragments have been found around palatial structure F, while a number of fragments were found at the base of a ramp of palatial structure G.

== Paintings ==
The frescoes were found in the precinct of the Thutmosid palace at Tell el-Dab'a in thousands of fragments on lime plaster. The paintings have been partially reconstructed to reveal bull-leaping and bull-grappling scenes, some against a maze pattern, and felines chasing ungulates. There are also hunting scenes, life sized figures, men with staffs, and a white female wearing a skirt, as well as griffins. The paintings can date to the early phase of the palaces. One group of paintings was found fallen off the wall of a doorway, and the other group of fragments was found in dumps deposited by the north-east palace. They seem to have been applied to the walls during the early part of Thutmose III's reign, and removed during the later Thutmosid period. There is a long frieze of bull-leaping and bull-grappling against a maze pattern. Especially important are the emblems of the Minoan palace such as the half rosette frieze and the presence of big griffins which are the same size as the ones in the throne room at Knossos on Crete, and the technique of the paintings are typically Aegean. The paintings are made with a basic coating of two or three layers of lime plaster, the surface is polished with a stone float, and then the paintings are made with a combination of fresco and stucco. The style of painting is very high quality, and compares with some of the best paintings from Crete.

=== Dating ===
It was primarily believed that the paintings belonged to the late Hyksos period of rule over Avaris, or to the early period of the 18th dynasty. Manfred Bietak originally dated the paintings to the Hyksos period in his book Avaris: The Capital of the Hyksos. However, with the continuation of excavations, evidence has pointed to the paintings originating in the early reign of Thutmose III during the time of the 18th dynasty. With the excavation of one of the 18th-century palaces, there appeared many scarabs with the names of early 18th dynasty pharaohs. However, as some of the fragments of the paintings were discovered in areas older than the palace, Bietak explains that it was only logical to assume that the paintings were of older origin as well, from before the 18th dynasty. However, a problem arose since the palatial structure cut into the Hyksos enclosure wall. Due to this evidence, the finding of more frescoes at a section of the excavation that belonged to the 18th dynasty, and the evaluation of pottery which was dated to the 18th dynasty, Bietak changed his mind and he dated the compound to the Thutmosid period.

=== Debate on its Minoan identity ===
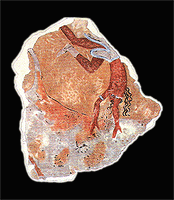
Fragment of a bull-leaper, from Tell el-Daba

There is debate on the ethnicity of the artists. Some, including Bietak, claim that the paintings were painted by Minoan artists, while others, like Cline, argue that this cannot be proven and that it may be that the artists just had a deep knowledge of Aegean art. Cline doubts the change in dating by Bietak, and Bietak's argument that the artists were Minoan. Cline says that the “Daba frescoes may simply be an indication that Hyksos artists also adopted aspects of other cultures,” and therefore believes that the artists were not Minoan. However, according to Bietak, the techniques used and the style and motifs employed leave no doubt that the artists were Minoan. The technique of using lime plaster in two layers with a highly polished surface, fresco in combination with stucco, all are techniques that are not Egyptian but are first seen in Minoan paintings. Also, the colors used by the artists are clearly Minoan. For example, using blue instead of grey is Minoan, with that color convention being seen in Egypt later, and due to Aegean influences. Together with this evidence, Egyptian hieroglyphs and emblems are not present among any of the fragments discovered. The composition of the paintings, which included mountainous scenery, and motifs, also fit in perfectly with those of the Aegean world. Thus the overwhelming evidence seems to point in the direction of Minoan artists having been at work in Avaris.

=== Importance ===
Much has been said about the importance of the paintings and their origin. The question of why these paintings appear in the Thutmosid palaces is a perplexing question for archaeologists and Egyptologists. According to Bietak, the use of specific Minoan royal motifs in a palace in Tell el-Dab'a indicates "an encounter on the highest level must have taken place between the courts of Knossos and Egypt." Manfred Bietak offers us one hypothesis. He points to the presence of Minoan royal emblems, the full scale griffins, and the large representation of the female in the skirt might suggest a political marriage between Thutmose III and a Minoan princess. The paintings are unique. They are one of a kind, and they compare with artwork from Knossos. Nanno Marinatos has made the case that the rosette motif, which is a prominent feature of the Taureador paintings, reproduces the Knossian rosettes and that it is a distinct Minoan symbol. In regards to Egypt, the paintings reveal an international era of cultural interaction between Egypt and the eastern Mediterranean. They also point to Tell el-Dab'a as a place where these cultural exchanges took place, meaning the city was incredibly important to Egypt. Marinatos has additionally argued that the Tell el Dab'a paintings are evidence of a koine, a visual language of common symbols, which testifies to interactions among the rulers of neighboring powers. The marriage of a Minoan princess to an Egyptian pharaoh may be one possible scenario but there are other ones. Minoan Knossian authority was involved in Egyptian affairs possibly because Crete had a strong naval force to offer the pharaoh.
