= Recortes =

Type of bullfighting

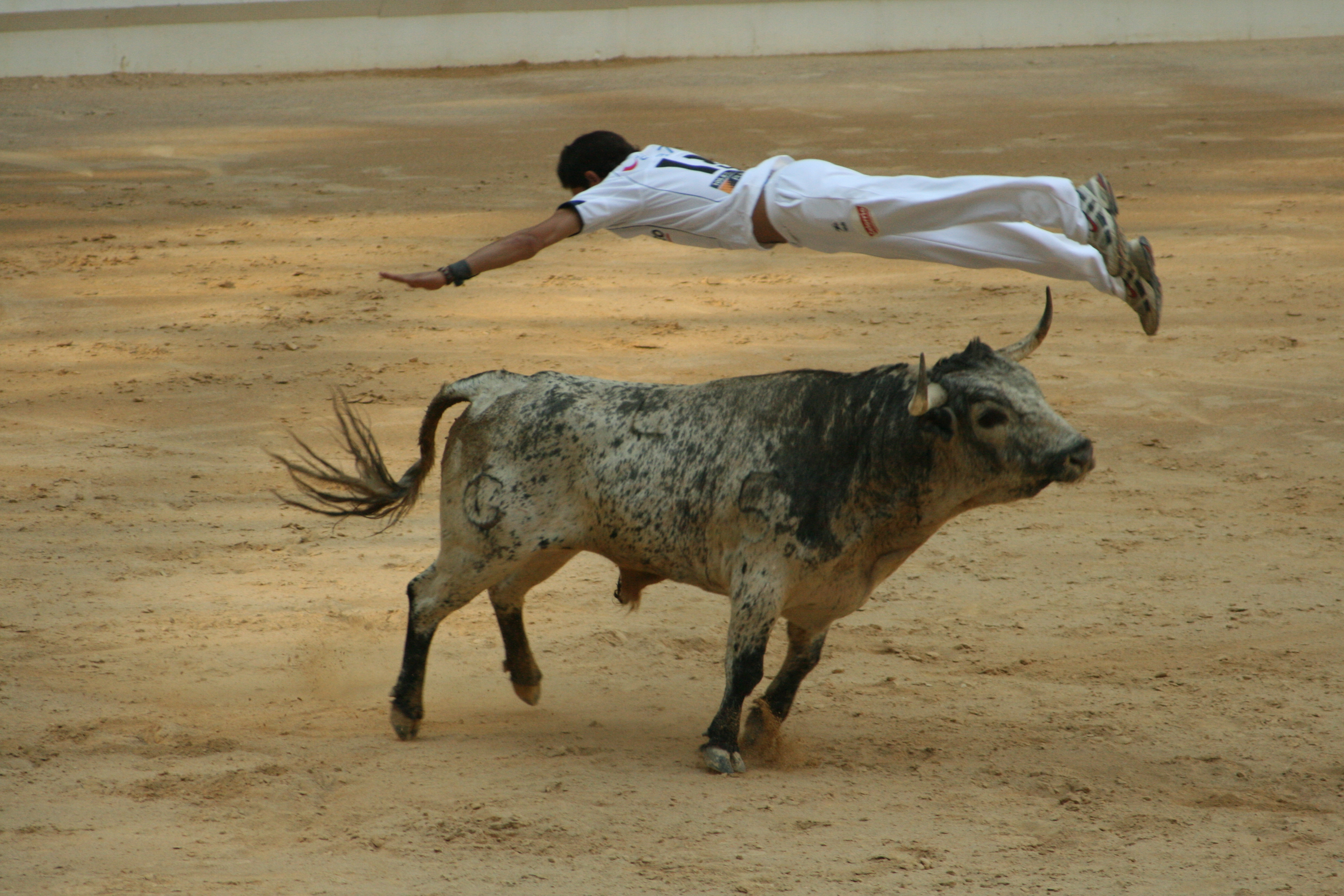
Recortador jumping over a bull

Recortes are a style of Spanish bullfighting where the bull is not harmed and recortadores must dodge charging bulls acrobatically without the use of capes or props, i.e. solely with their own body's movements. It is traditional to the Spanish regions near the Ebro river, Basque Country, Madrid, Extremadura and Valencia.

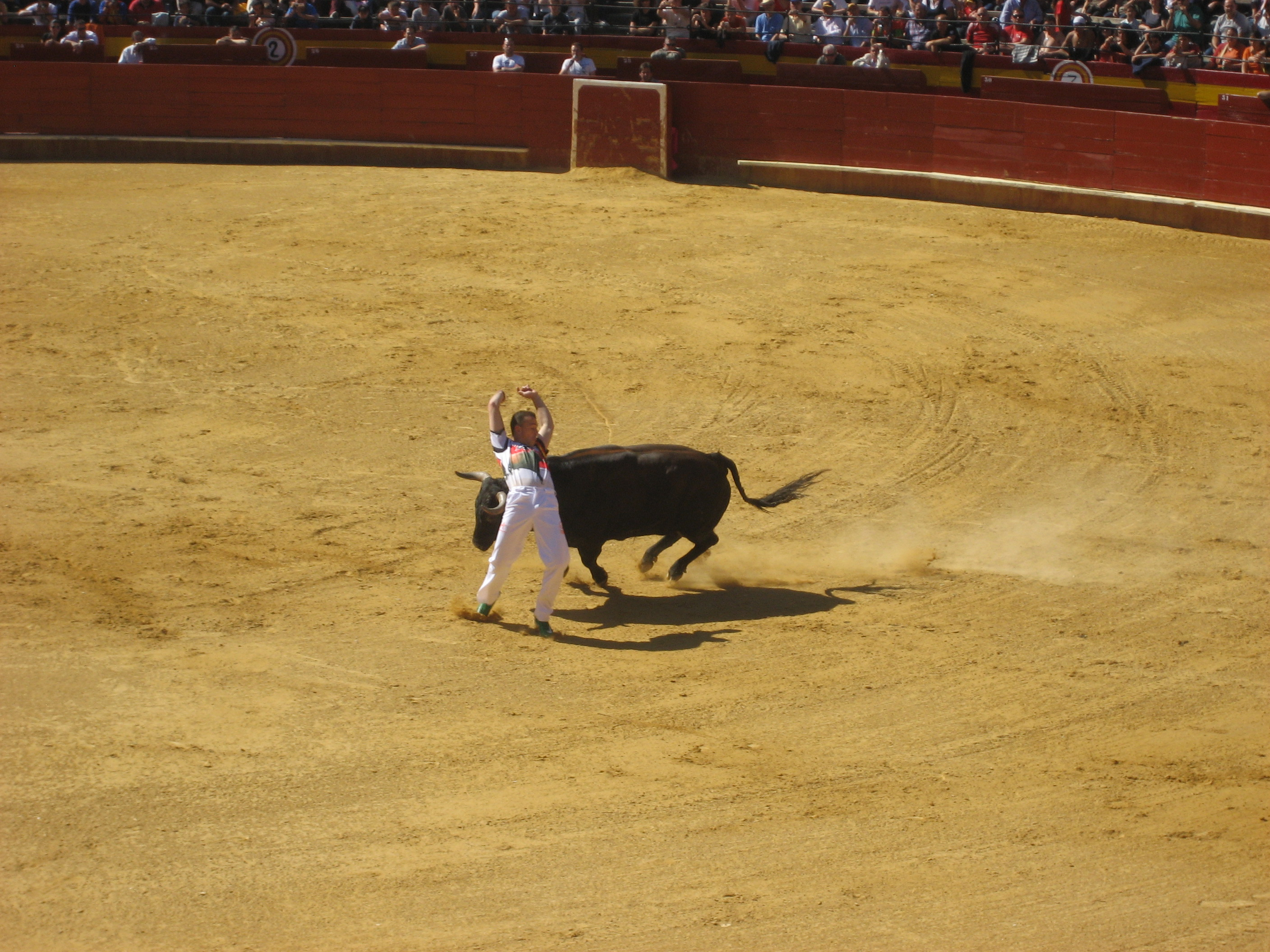
Recortador during the 2008 national championship

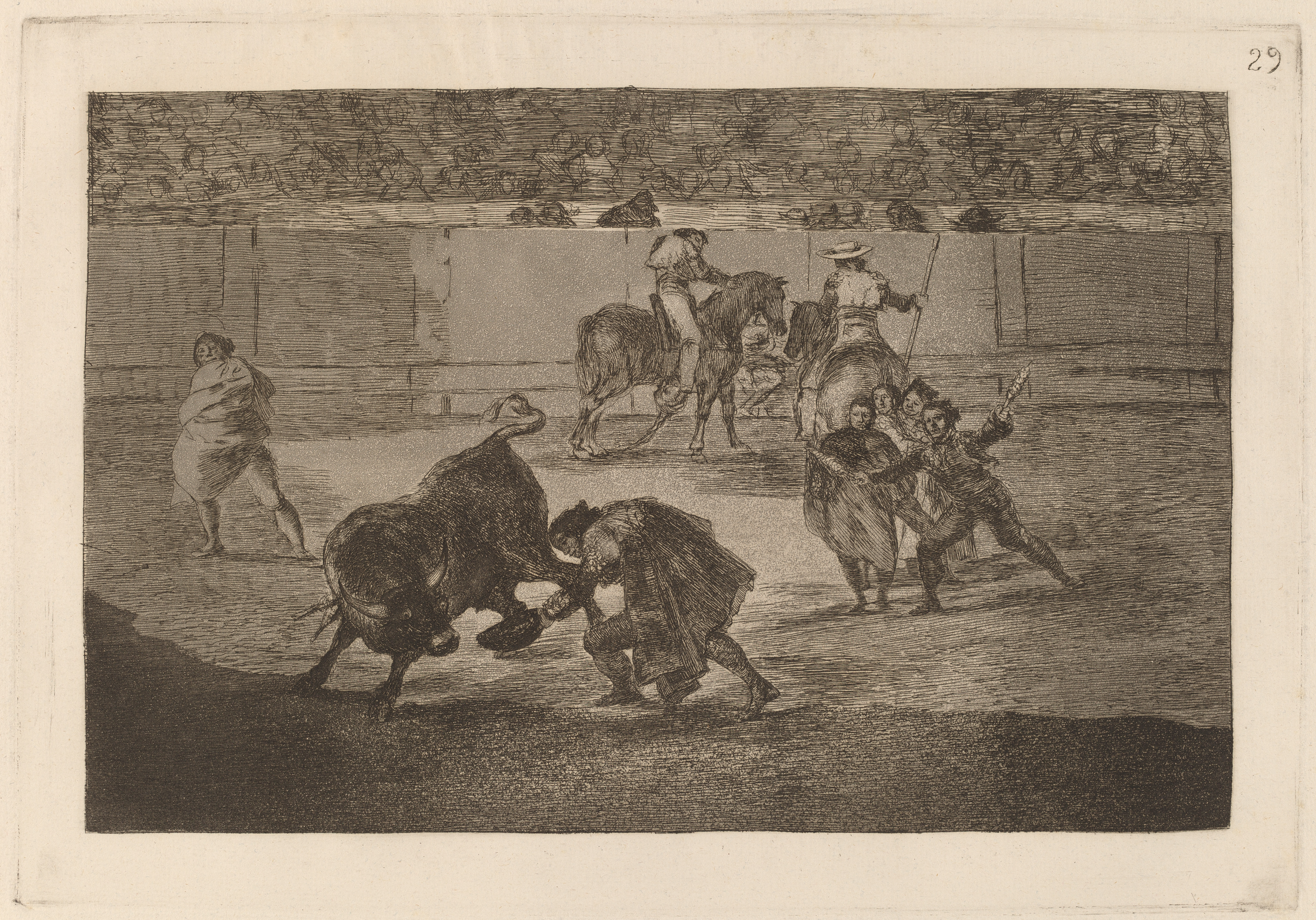
Pepe Illo Making the Pass of the "Recorte" by Francisco Goya, in or before 1816.

It has been proposed as an alternative to traditional bullfighting corridas as the animal is not harmed or killed. It is also considered easier to market.

As opposed to traditional bullfighting, recortadores do not wear elaborate outfits and instead usually wear jerseys. It is also cheaper to become a recortador than a traditional bullfighter, although prizes are also lower.

== Types ==
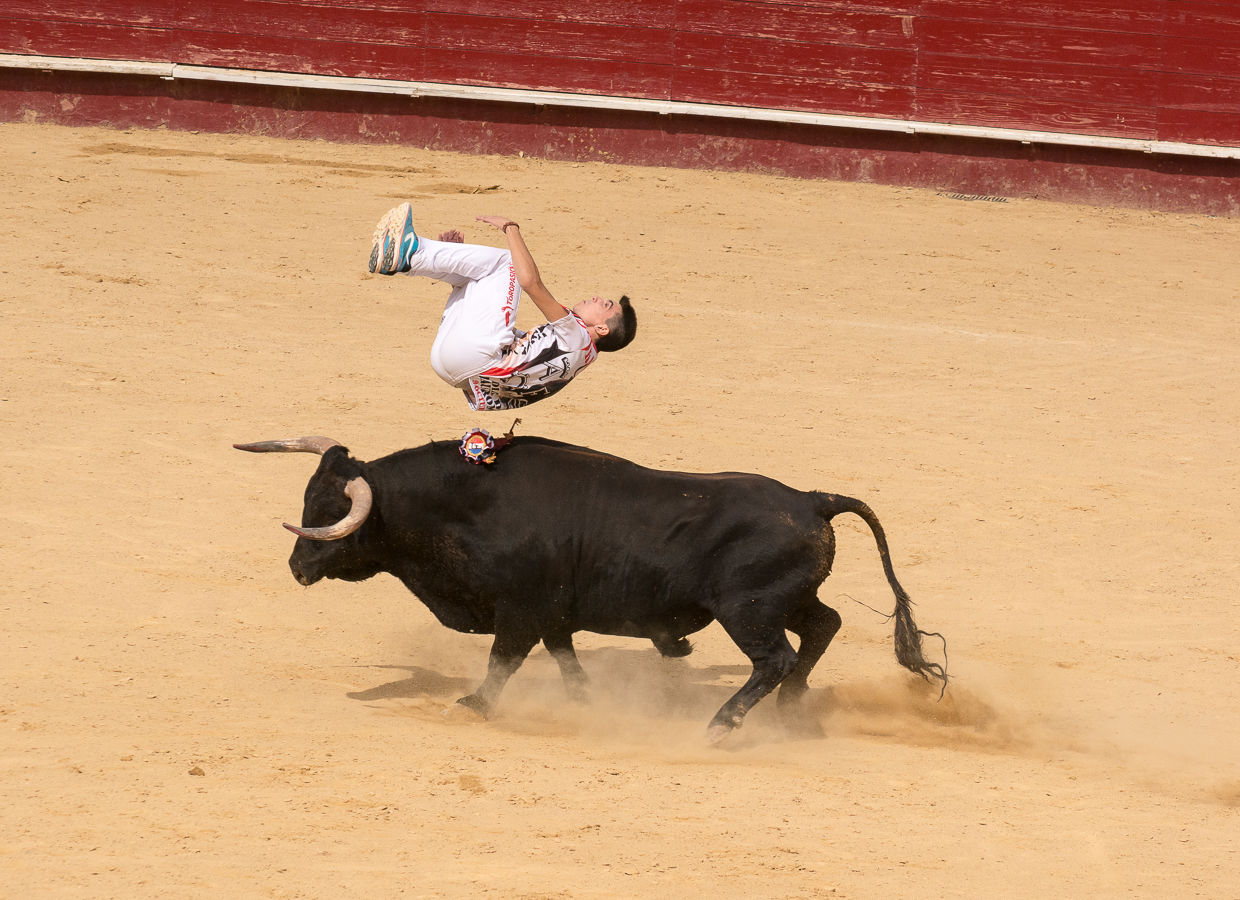
Recortador jumping backwards over a bull

- Concurso de Recorte Libre (i.e. "free trim competition"), where the recortadores take turns leaping and dodging over various different bulls;
- Concurso de Cortes (i.e. "competition of cuts"), where only some types of dodges (the ones called recortes) are allowed;
- Concurso de recortadores con anillas (i.e. "competition of recortadores with rings), which is usually done in couples and where recortadores compete to place as many rings as possible in a bull's horns within the allotted time.

== See also ==
Course camarguaise, where the competitors try to retrieve a white rosette from between the bull's horns.
