= Course landaise =

Form of bullfighting and bull-leaping

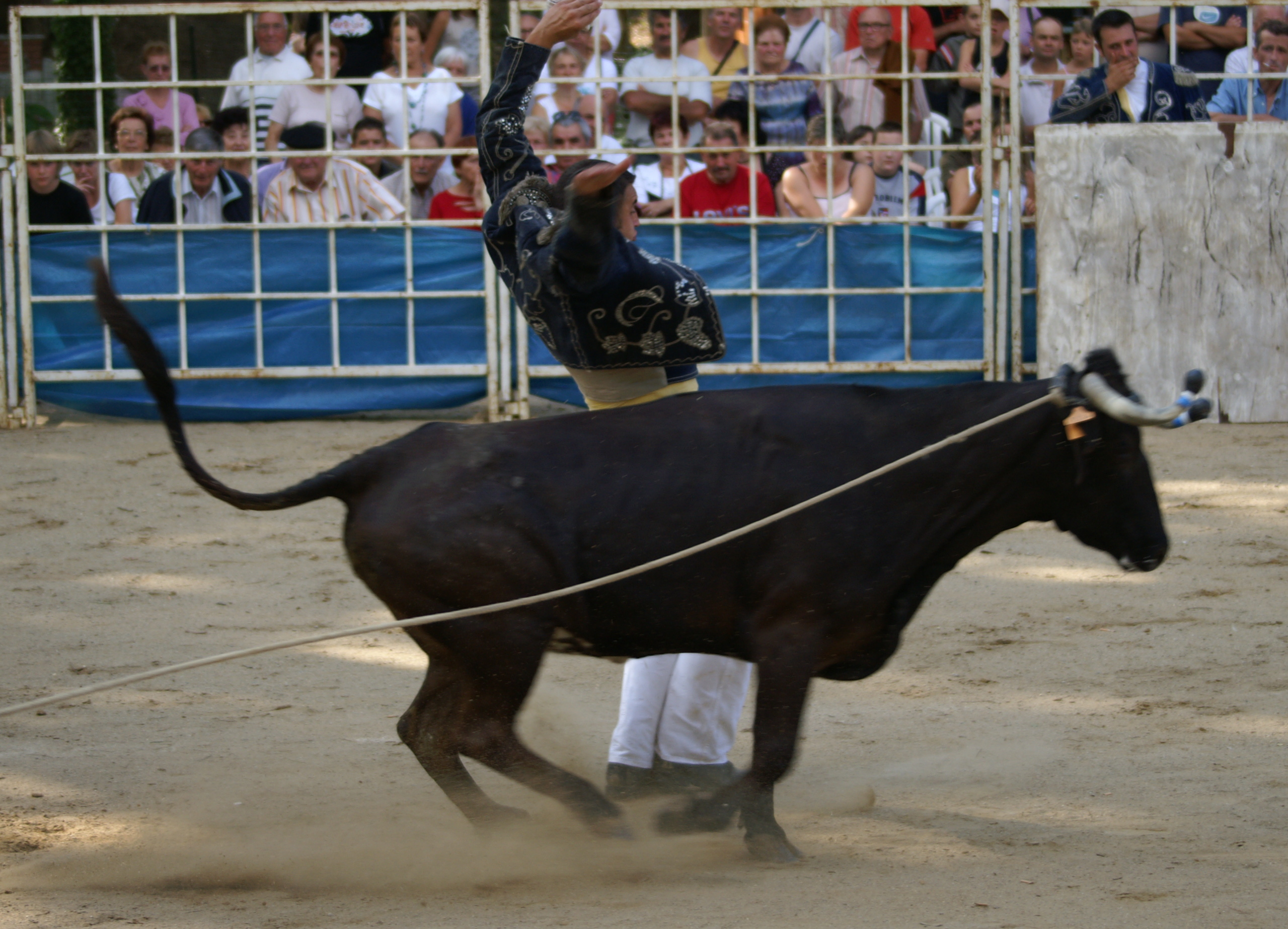
An écarteur in action

The course landaise (Occitan: Curs landés) is an ancient form of bullfighting and bull-leaping held in oval or rectangular arenas covered in sand, that involves no bloodshed. Experienced cows, with large horns, aged generally from 2 to 14 years old, are used instead of bulls. They are athletic but (by modern standards) small animals selected from the same breed as the bulls used for the Spanish corridas. In Gascony, it is a major spectator sport, counting as many as 600 events each year.

The course landaise is one of various forms of entertainment involving a bull or a cow found throughout the south of France, and the Iberian peninsula. The course landaise is for the most part the main attraction of the yearly celebrations held in villages of western Gascony (Bas-Armagnac, Chalosse, and Bearn) and as far west as Bayonne. Other forms of related entertainments are the running of the bulls made famous in the neighboring Spanish Basque Country by the Ferias of Pamplona, but also enjoyed in Bayonne and smaller towns of Gascony such as Nogaro. The course landaise can in a way be compared with the steer-wrestling events in American rodeos to the extent that they are related expressions of a rural culture that can be traced to the ancient Basque tradition of Iberia. of running in front of bulls.

This form of bullfighting is a traditional game of cow or bull dodging and leaping. One needs courage, composure and agility to participate in this dangerous sport. Deaths of toreros or écarteurs, although rare, do happen occasionally. The écarteurs are well-respected professionals but never earn enough to support themselves with the sport alone. However, their passion for this dangerous sport allows them to benefit from the full support of the aficionados throughout the region.

== Explanation ==
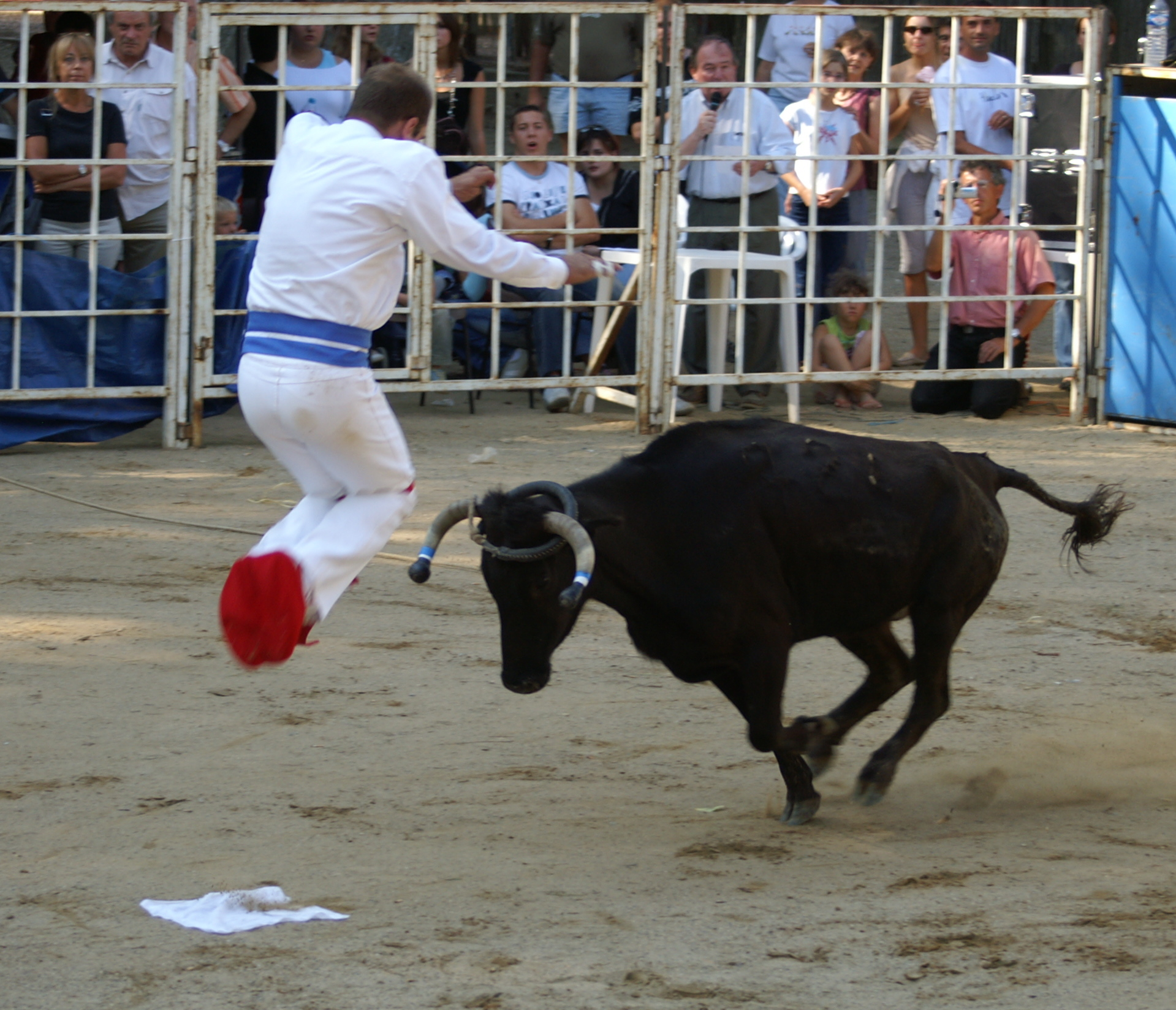
A sauteur in action

Video of two sauteurs in action in Nogaro, August 15, 2009

A cuadrilla or team of toreros landais faces, in a traditional and precisely prescribed game, vigorous fighting cows of Spanish breeds, such as the toro bravo or toro de lidia. The teams come from stock farms and wear, like any other team of sportsmen, their own colours. Each écarteur wears an embroidered suit, which makes him recognizable to fans.

The cows are specially bred and grow up in the wild, on rural ganaderias (cattle farms or ranches) and are of a considerable size (300 to 500 kg or 660 to 1,100 lb and 125 to 130 cm or 49 to 51 in). They are extremely quick and can easily leap 2-metre (6 ft) fences. They are specially trained to defend themselves in their own natural way, and benefit from years of fighting in the arenas. The Ganaderias are mainly located in the Landes, in the region of Chalosse, essentially between Dax and Aire-sur-l'Adour.

The cows (or coursayres in the Gascon dialect of Occitan) all have their own name and are classified for pugnacity. Before the game starts they are all put in their own private cabin, called a loge. A rope is fixed around their horns in order to be able bring them during the game to their starting position.

During the course the cows leave their loge in a predetermined order and are led by the cordier, the man who holds the rope and two entraîneurs, to the position in front of the torero placed roughly in the middle of the arena. The torero challenges the cow and to allow her to attack, calling out "Hup, hup!" The cordier lets out the rope, enabling the cow to attack.

The enthusiastic public continuously gives financial premiums for courage and audacity; these are announced between the festive music which is constantly playing.

The toreros are divided in two categories:

- the écarteurs or dodgers, which avoid the cow charging at full speed at the very last moment with a feint and a graceful movement. This is done with and sometimes without the protection of the rope. Judges are well placed to appreciate how close to the cow the écarteurs remain and reward them for their elegance, panache, composure and courage.
- the sauteur or leaper, also waits for the charging cow and vaults at the very last moment over the wild animal in ways reminiscent of the ancient games of Crete and similar to the vaults practiced in modern gymnastics. Tradition also requires the sauteurs to tie their legs together and stuff their feet in a beret (the traditional hat native to this part of France) to perform some of the leaps.

The cows are judged on their enthusiasm for the fight, agility and reliability to produce spectacular charges and the ganaderos compete for the honor of producing the best coursayres.

The athletes are supported by a cast of very experienced handlers who advise them and protect them from severe injury or humiliation. The Teneur de corde or cordier controls the dangling rope attached to cow's horns while the entraîneur positions the cow to face and attack the player. They are generally former toreros.

The participants to this game are excellent athletes and generally peak in their early thirties since a lot of experience is necessary to dominate the wild cows.

The courses Landaises are held year round with the majority of events occurring from June to early October. The most prized events are usually held in Nogaro, Bas-Armagnac in the Gers, (Corne d'Or, Championnat de France final), but the nearby region of Chalosse in the Landes is generally regarded as the cradle of the Course Landaise and hosts events year-round.

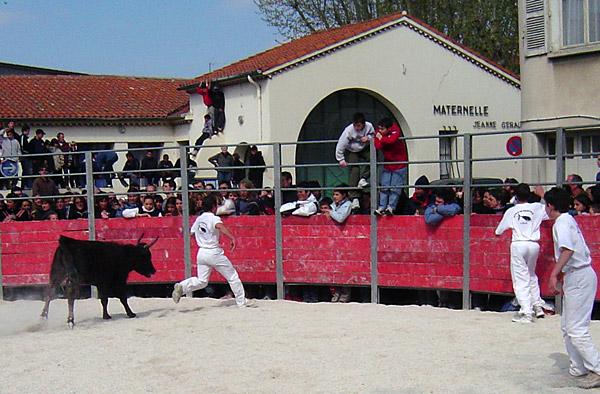
A young raseteur flees from a bull, during a "course camargaise", very different from a "course landaise".

== Origin ==
This form of bullfighting has been popular with Gascons for centuries. For example, in Saint-Sever as early as 1457 during the Celebration of Saint John cows were released in the streets for a free run.

In La Teste-de-Buch it was tradition to brand the cows in the dunes. In sand the animals are less dangerous and there arose a game which existed in jumping over cows.

The course landaise was regulated in the 19th century and transmitted to special arenas. The centralized government attempted repeatedly to forbid the courses landaises, viewed as dangerous and a mild proof of rural and regional resistance to the integration of Gascony to the French State, but the Gascons, well known for their free spirit, ignored the administrative rulings and persisted with their favorite entertainment. Nowadays the course landaise are still very fashionable in the Landes and the west of the Gers where almost every village of more than 200 souls maintains its permanent or semi-permanent arena. Closer to Bordeaux, the tradition has mainly been lost, except in Floirac (Lot), La Brède and Captieux.

== The three event types ==
=== Course formelle ===
Everything happens in style according to the ancient regulations. The participants to these courses are all professionals. It lasts approximately 2 h 15 min with a pause. It always starts on the music of the "Marche cazérienne", a tune composed for the sport in 1900 by Fernand Tassine of the Mont-de-Marsan orchestra; with the écarteurs marching into the arena to the tune and formally saluting the public.

A jury stipulates a score which counts for the annual national competition.

=== Concours landais ===
The rules of the formal course Landaise are respected, but the classification in the national competition is individual. Here too its participants are all professionals.

=== Course mixte ===
The mixed courses are open for amateurs. The first part is formal and in the second part the public can participate.

In the popular resorts on the Atlantic coast of the Landes many events are organized in which the tourists can take part.

Sometimes the game is also played as part of a challenge to another village. In this case, only amateurs participate, and the event is mostly centered on daring acts similar to those performed by the clowns in the rodeos. Usually, younger, lighter animals are preferred to minimize injuries. These challenges are called intervilles ('inter-villages'), and the events can also incorporate other activities, such as swimming pools, seesaws, soccer or rugby games, caterpillar races, etc.
