= Canton of Montréal, Gers =

Coordinates: 43.95083°N 0.20306°E

Montreal
- Former canton
- Interactive map of Montreal
- Country: France
- Region: Occitania
- Department: Gers
- No. of communes: 9
- Disbanded: 2015
- Area: 241.62 km^{2} (93.29 sq mi)
- Population (2012): 4,967
  - Density: 20.56/km^{2} (53.24/sq mi)

The canton of Montréal is a former administrative division in the Gers department, which is itself a component of the region Occitanie, in the area formerly called Gascony, France. It had 4,967 inhabitants (2012). It was disbanded following the French canton reorganisation which came into effect in March 2015. It consisted of nine communes, which joined the canton of Armagnac-Ténarèze in 2015.

== Geography ==
The canton lies around Montréal in the arrondissement of Condom, the altitudes vary between 64 m at Fourcès and 186 m at Castelnau-d'Auzan with an average altitude of 143 m. The canton is situated on the limits of the departements Lot-et-Garonne and Landes. The canton of Montréal had a total area of 240 km^{2}.

It is a rural agrarian area, practically without tourism. The Armagnac-Ténarèze, is exclusively focused on production of Armagnac, foie gras and Côtes de Gascogne wines.

The canton comprised the following communes:

- Castelnau-d'Auzan
- Cazeneuve
- Fourcès
- Gondrin
- Labarrère
- Lagraulet-du-Gers
- Larroque-sur-l'Osse
- Lauraët
- Montréal

== Population and demography ==
Like in other communes in rural France, the canton is facing a major decline in population. In 1962 the canton had 5,938 citizens. At the last count of the population in 2012, only 4,967 inhabitants could be counted, representing a decrease of nearly 20%.

Young people leave the area, the old stay behind.

This phenomenon started, as in many other rural areas during the War of 1914-1918. Many young men did not return home, with the consequences we still see to day. Lack of manpower changed the once wealthy and healthy pastoral area in a region where the population and wealth both decreased. New immigrants from Spain and Italy compensated partly for the loss in population.

After the independence of Algeria, French farmers and winemakers returning to the motherland were encouraged to settle down in the Gers.

All these waves of immigrants now are completely integrated.

Due to the changes in the rural economics the last decade agricultural land and farms were put on the market and sold to newcomers from the north of Europe, looking for an active countryside way of life.

Gradually immigration changed, nowadays retired people from the north European urban areas come to the Gers in search of idyllic homes for their retirement.

== Character, monuments and history of the canton ==
Because of its landscapes and its vineyards the Gers is now and then called by some the "Tuscany of France". The summers are long and warm; the winters are warm and short.

In the neighbourhood are numerous old castles, little medieval walled villages, small cities built around castles and "sacred" places, because the Via Podiensis and the Way of St. James of Compostela are going through the Montréal and left their traces.

- The arena for the course Landaise for example in Castelnau-d'Auzan.
- Old Armagnac caves.
- The bastide of Bretagne-d'Armagnac.
- The Bastide Gasconne of Fourcès.
- The city of Montréal-du-Gers with a medieval bastide.
- The city of Eauze and its Roman treasure.
- The fortified village of Larressingle.
- The Gallo-Roman villa of Séviac, in Montréal-du-Gers.
- The Ganaderia de Buros.
- The museum of D'Artagnan in Lupiac.
- The Spa of Barbotan-les-Thermes in Cazaubon.
