= Via Podiensis =

Route through France to Spain

The Routes of St. James in France

The Via Podiensis or the Le Puy Route is one of the four routes through France on the pilgrimage to the tomb of St. James the Great in Santiago de Compostela in Galicia in northwest Spain. It leaves from Le-Puy-en-Velay and crosses the countryside in stages to the stele of Gibraltar in the basque village of Uhart-Mixe. Near there it merges with two of the other routes, the via Turonensis and the via Lemovicensis which merge a little earlier.

The three then become the Navarre Route, passing via the French town of Saint-Jean-Pied-de-Port and crossing the Pyrenees and the Spanish border by one path or another to Roncesvalles in the Spanish province of Navarre. Together they serve as the principal pilgrimage route across Spain, known as the Camino francés. The fourth French route, the via Tolosane, crosses the Pyrenees at a different point (Somport), becomes the Aragonese Way when it enters Spain, and joins the Camino frances further to the west.

Before le Puy, the via Gebennensis leaves from Geneva, gathering Swiss and German pilgrims and feeding into the via Podiensis. Though it bears a Latin name, the via Gebennensis is a modern route laid out in 1980-90, though the numerous hospitals it passes testify to the passage of pilgrims along this route in earlier ages.

From Geneva to the Pyrenees, the two routes (via Gebennensis and via Podiensis) are waymarked as one of the French major hiking routes, the GR 65, with a few local variations or detours, including GR 651 through the valley of Célé and GR 652 via Rocamadour.

== History ==
According to the A Guide for the Traveller compiled by Aymeric Picaud in the 12th century, four routes lead to Santiago de Compostela:

- the via Turonensis, leaving from Paris, passing through Tours
- the via Lemovicensis, leaving from Vézelay, passing through Limoges
- the via Podiensis, leaving from Puy-en-Velay, passing through Cahors and Moissac
- the via Tolosane, leaving from Arles, passing through Toulouse

In 950 or 951, Godescalc, bishop of Le Puy-en-Velay, set off on a pilgrimage to Santiago de Compostela. He was the first non-Hispanic to undertake the pilgrimage, leading a large caravan that included members of the clergy, their staff and servants, various nobles and gentlemen, their retainers and men at arms.

== The modern route ==
Via Podiensis - Departments

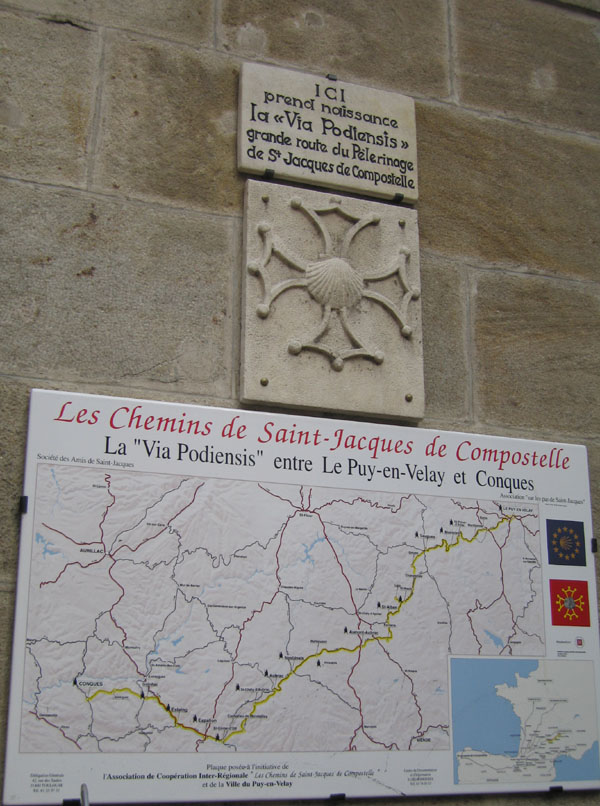
The beginning of the Via Podiensis in Le Puy

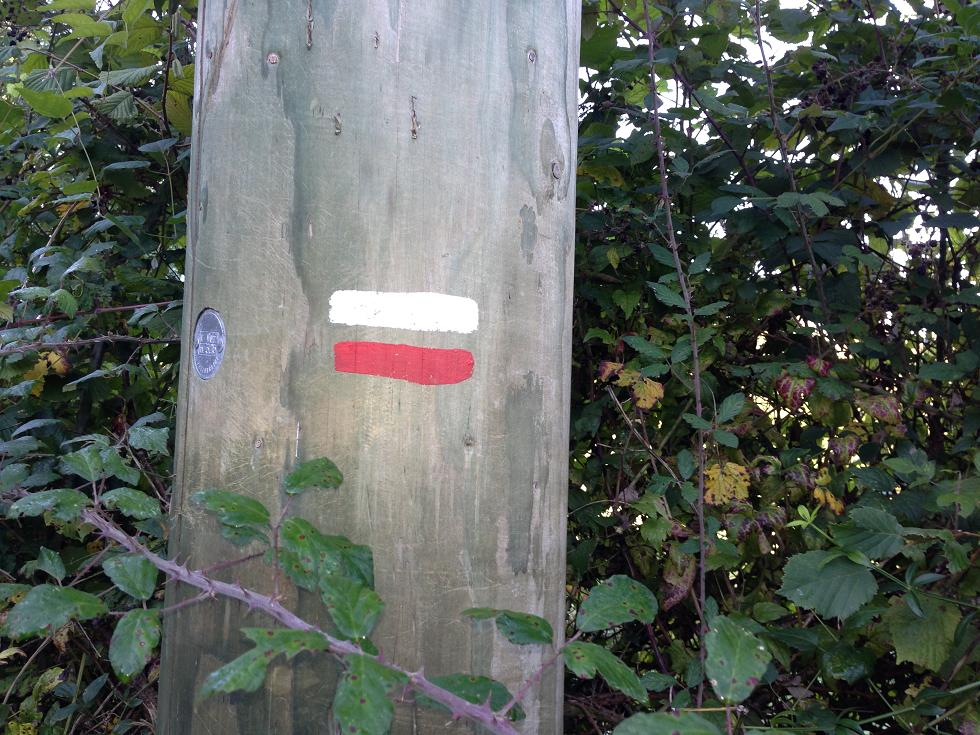
Typical waymarking: It means "this is the path."

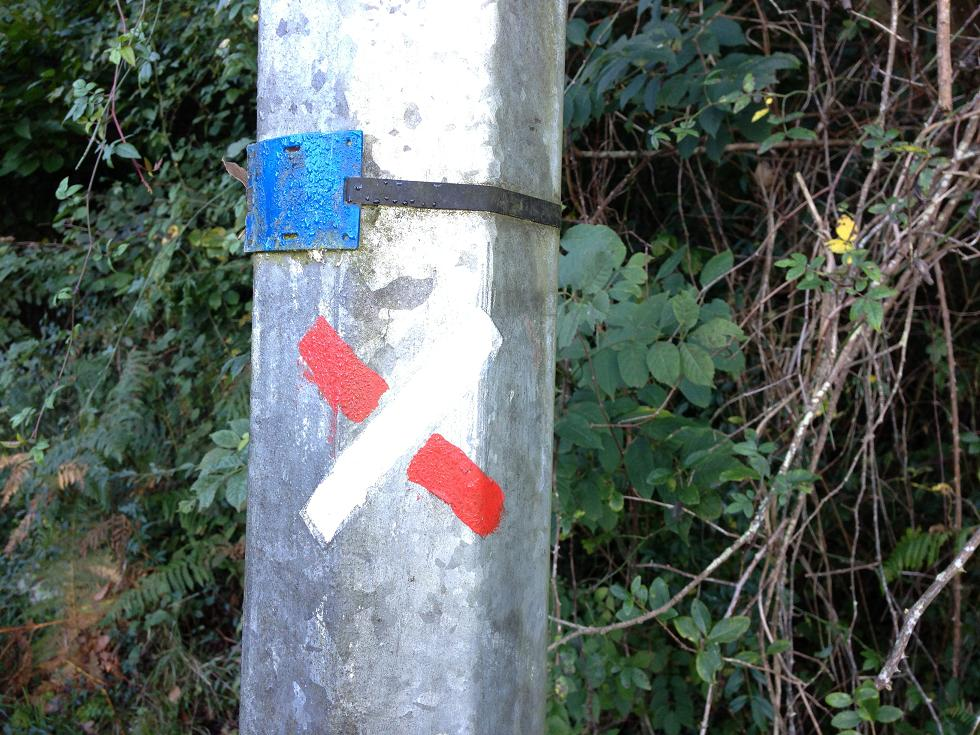
Typical waymarking: "this is not the path".

In Haute-Loire

The route leaves Le Puy-en-Velay and passes Vals-près-le-Puy, Saint-Christophe-sur-Dolaison, Bains, Saint-Privat-d'Allier, Monistrol-d'Allier, Saugues, and Chanaleilles.

In Lozère

The route passes Saint-Alban-sur-Limagnole, Aumont-Aubrac, Malbouzon, Rieutort-d'Aubrac, Marchastel, and Nasbinals.

In Aveyron

The route passes Aubrac, Saint-Chély-d'Aubrac, Saint-Côme-d'Olt, Espalion, Bessuéjouls, Estaing, Golinhac, Espeyrac, Sénergues, Conques, Noailhac, Decazeville, and Livinhac-le-Haut.

In Lot

The route passes through Montredon, Saint-Félix, Figeac, and Béduer.

A variant route follows the valley of the river Lot, passing Gréalou, Cajarc, and Varaire. A second variation passes through the valley of the Célé, Espagnac-Sainte-Eulalie, Marcilhac-sur-Célé, Sauliac-sur-Célé, Cabrerets, Saint-Cirq-Lapopie. The two variants converge and pass through Cahors, Labastide-Marnhac, Lhospitalet, Lascabanes, Montcuq. A third variant running north of the route passes through Rocamadour.

In Tarn-et-Garonne

The route passes Lauzerte, Moissac, and Auvillar.

In Gers

The route passes Saint-Antoine-sur-l'Arrats, Flamarens, Miradoux, Lectoure, La Romieu, Condom, Valence-sur-Baïse, Larressingle, Beaumont sur l'Osse, the Abbaye de Flaran (off the route), Montréal-du-Gers, Lauraët, Lagraulet-du-Gers, Eauze, Manciet, Nogaro, Barcelonne-du-Gers.

In Landes

The route passes Aire-sur-l'Adour, after which hikers and pilgrims can pass by either Pécorade and Geaune or by Miramont-Sensacq. Those two routes converge once more at Pimbo.

In the Pyrénées-Atlantiques

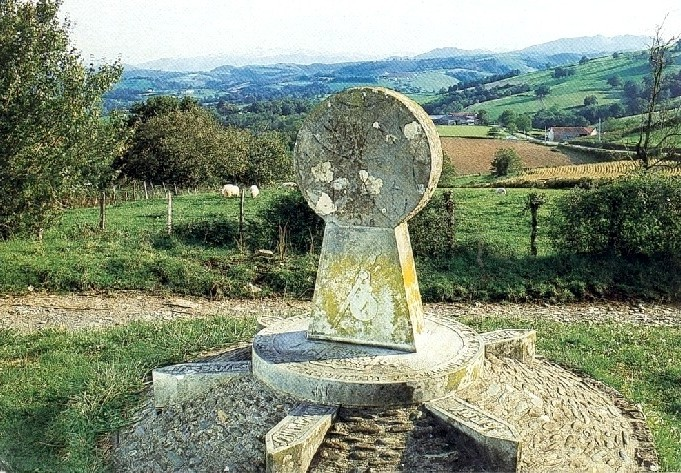
Stele of Gibraltar (Xibaltarre hilarria).

The route passes Arzacq-Arraziguet, Vignes, Louvigny, Uzan, Pomps, Arthez-de-Béarn, Sauvelade, Navarrenx, Charre, Aroue to reach the stèle of Gibraltar (Xibaltarre hilarria) in the village of Uhart-Mixe.

The distance from the stele of Gibraltar to Santiago de Compostela is 768 kilometers (477 miles).

== Gallery ==
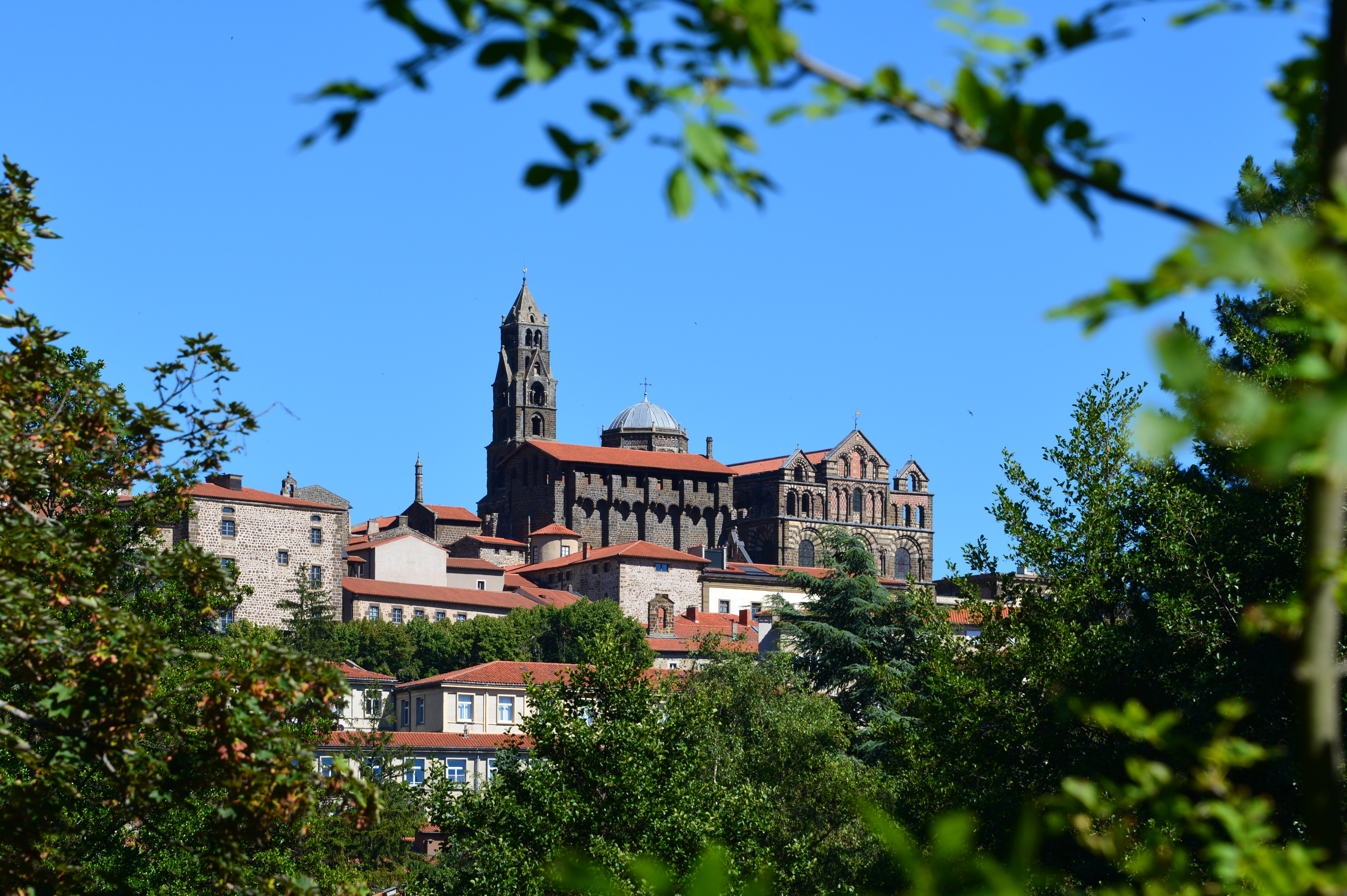
Cathedral of Our Lady of the Annunciation in Le Puy-en-Velay.

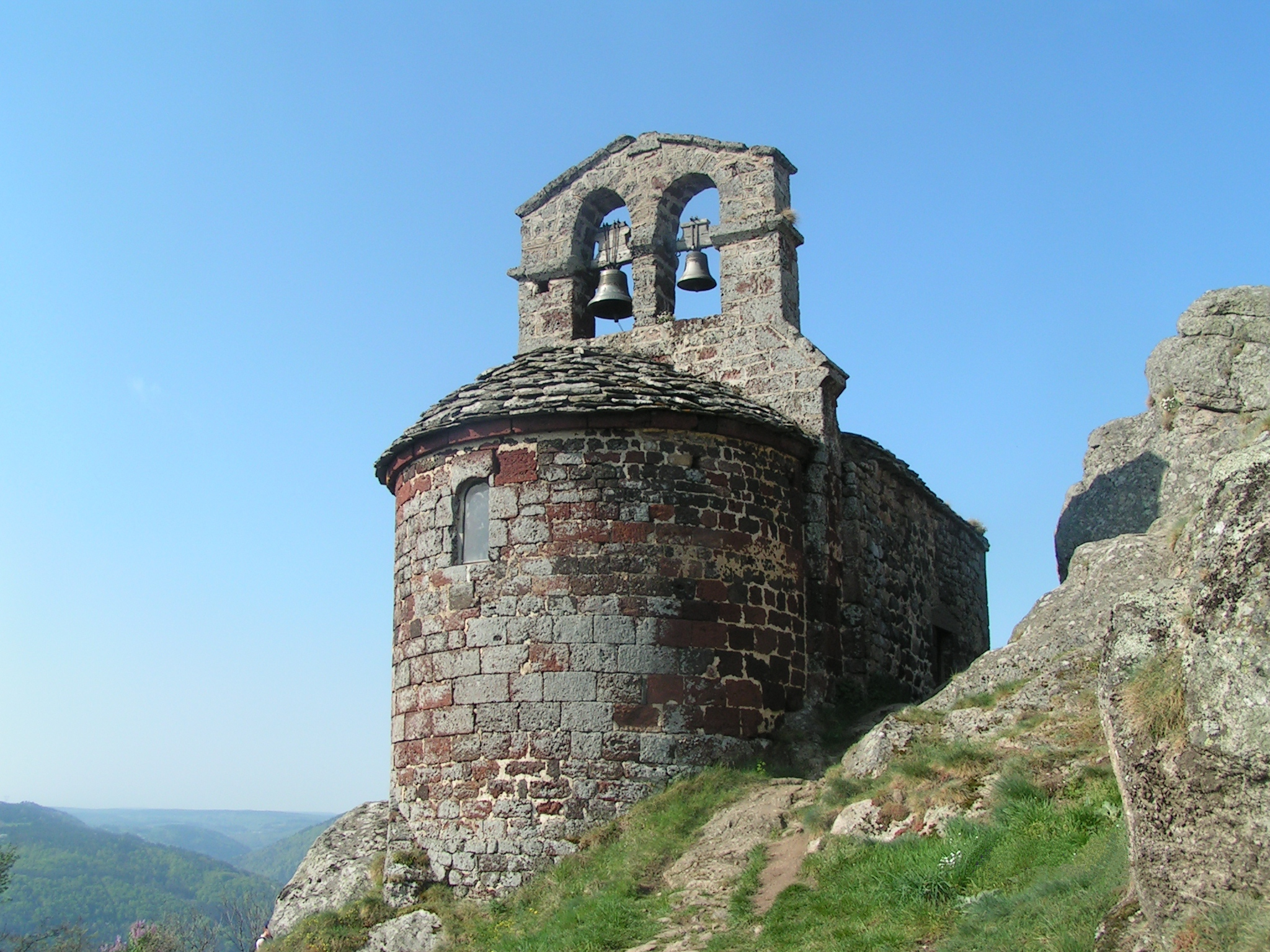
Perched chapel near Saint-Privat-d'Allier.

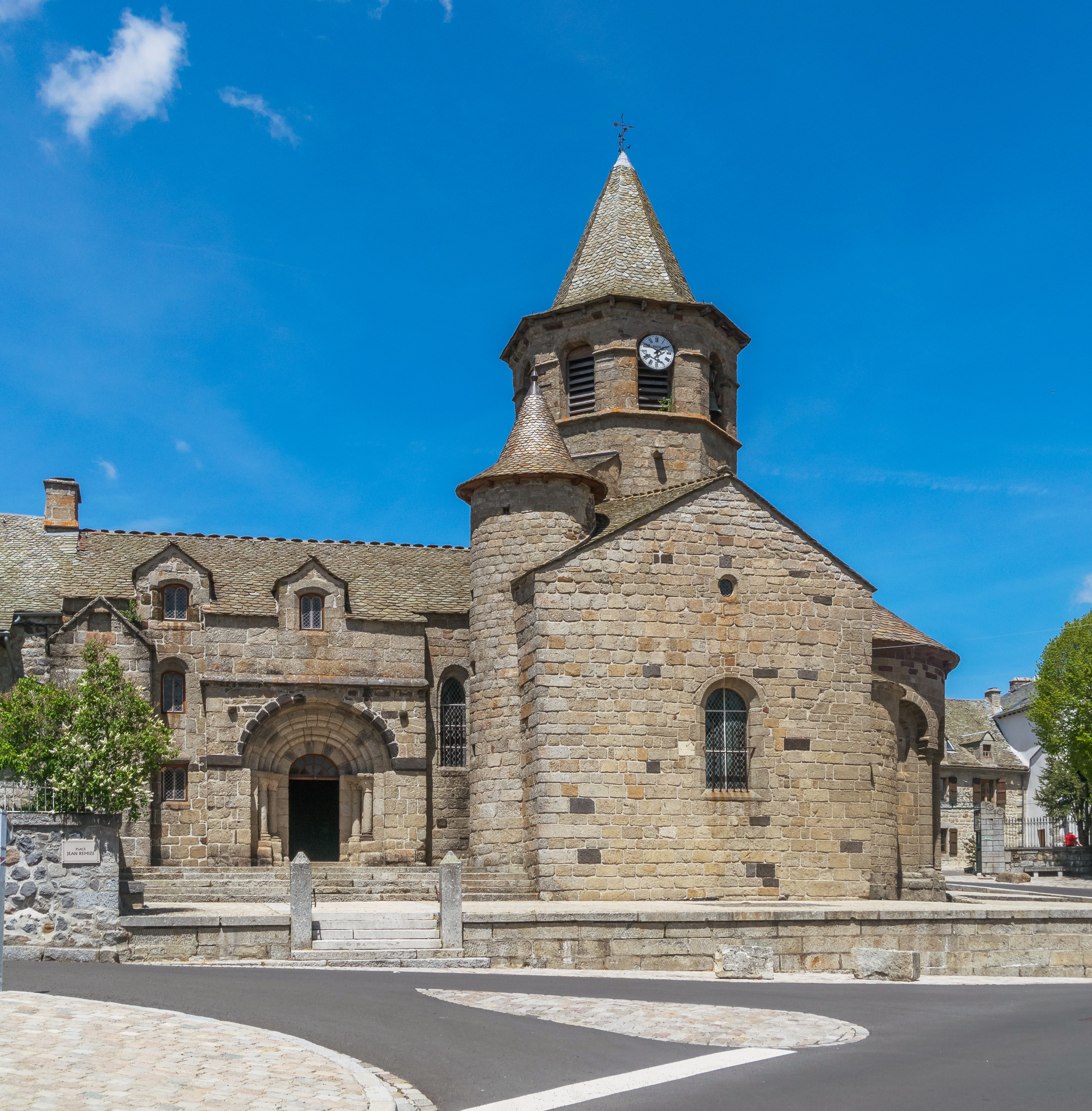
Saint Mary’s Church in Nasbinals.

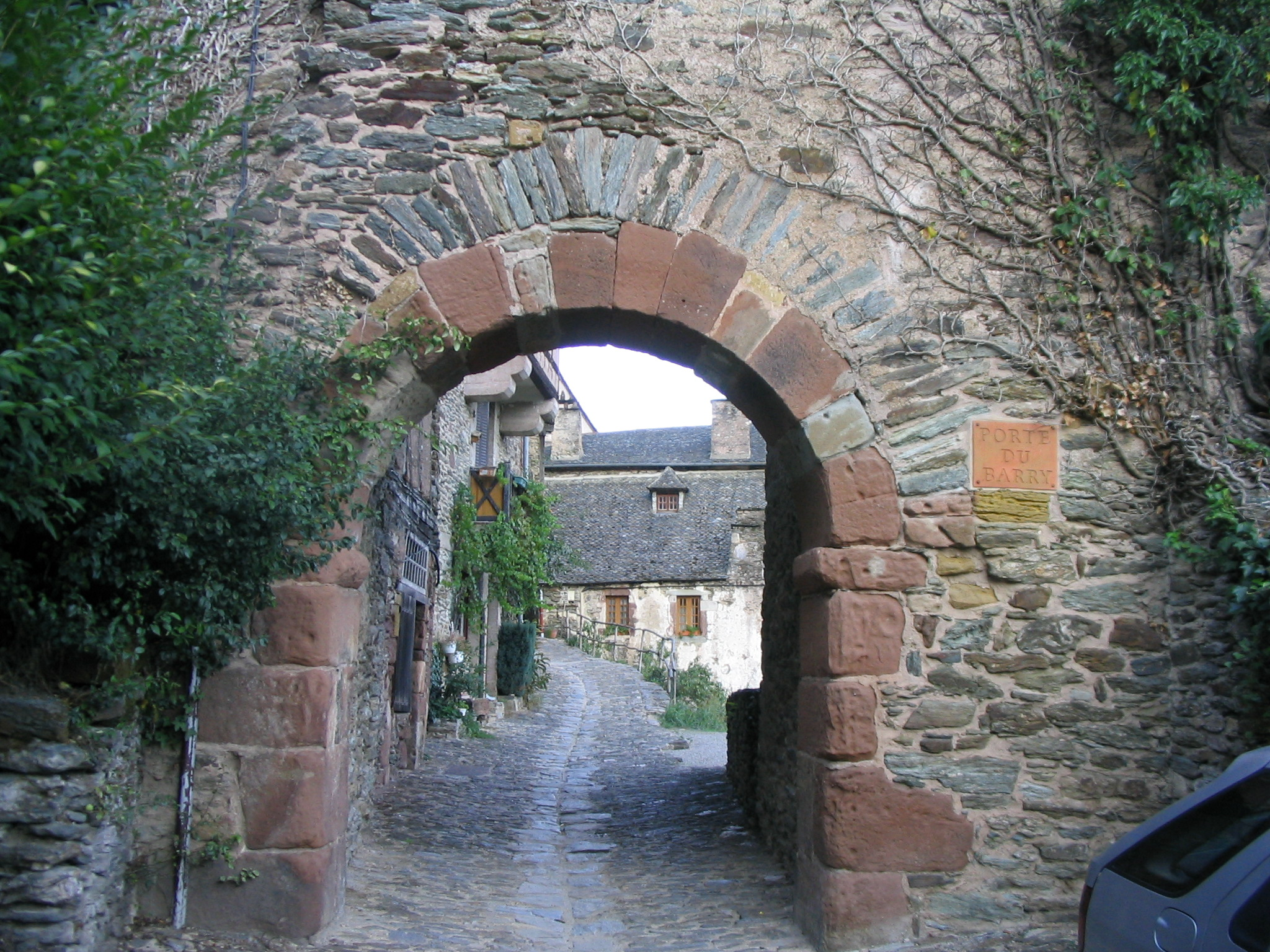
Arch way in Conques.

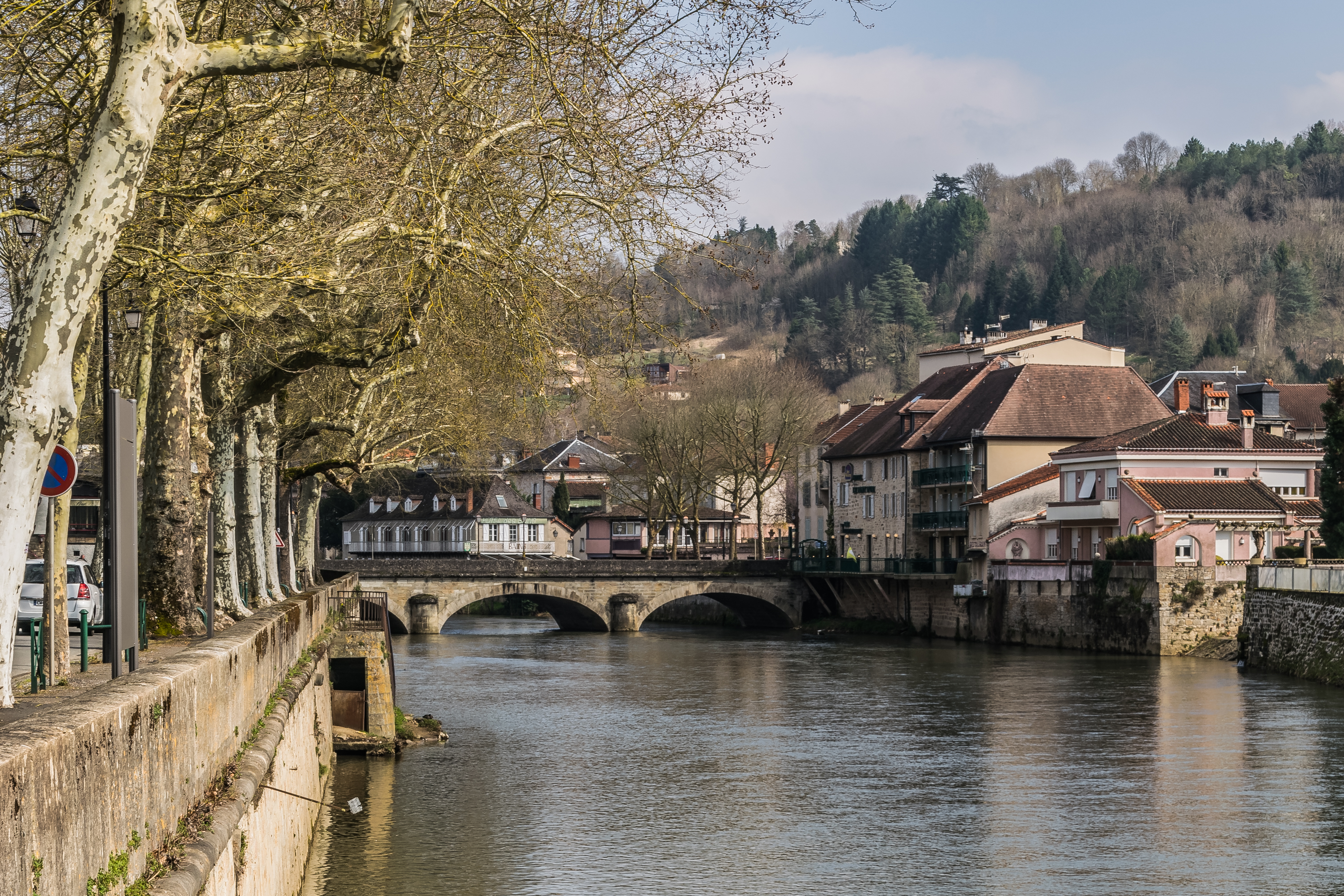
Célé River in Figeac.

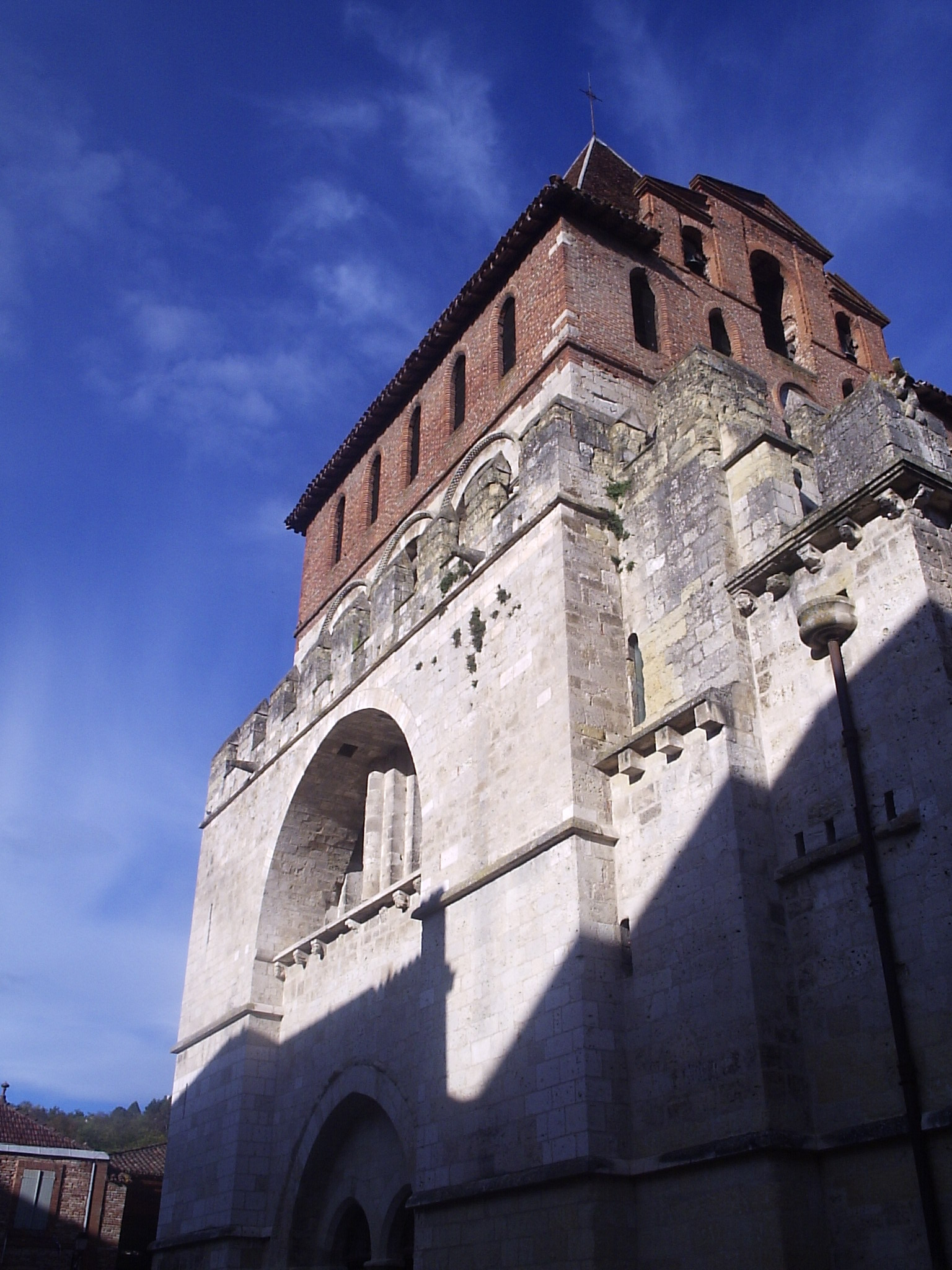
Saint Peter’s Abbey in Moissac.

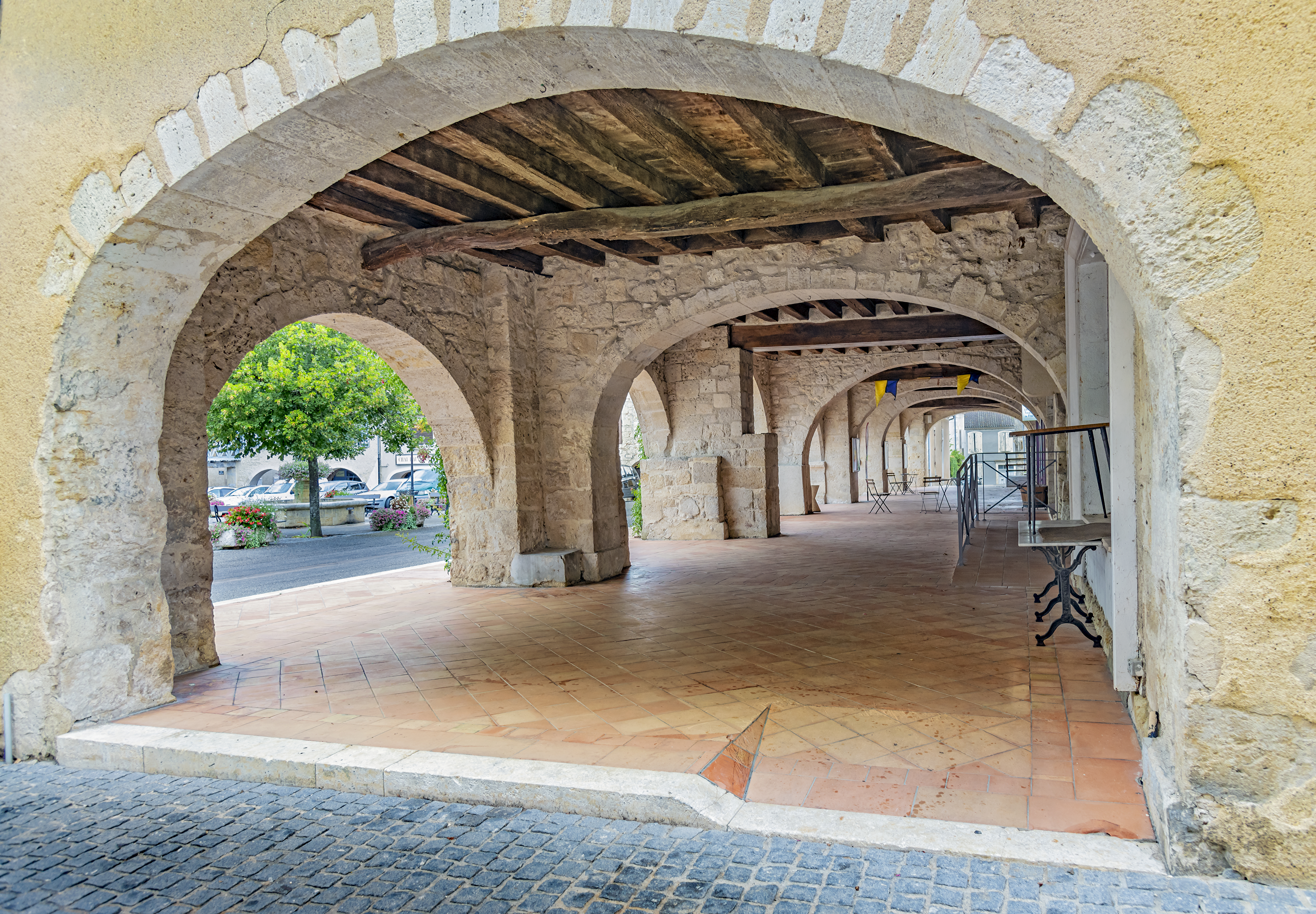
Arcades in Montreal-du-Gers.

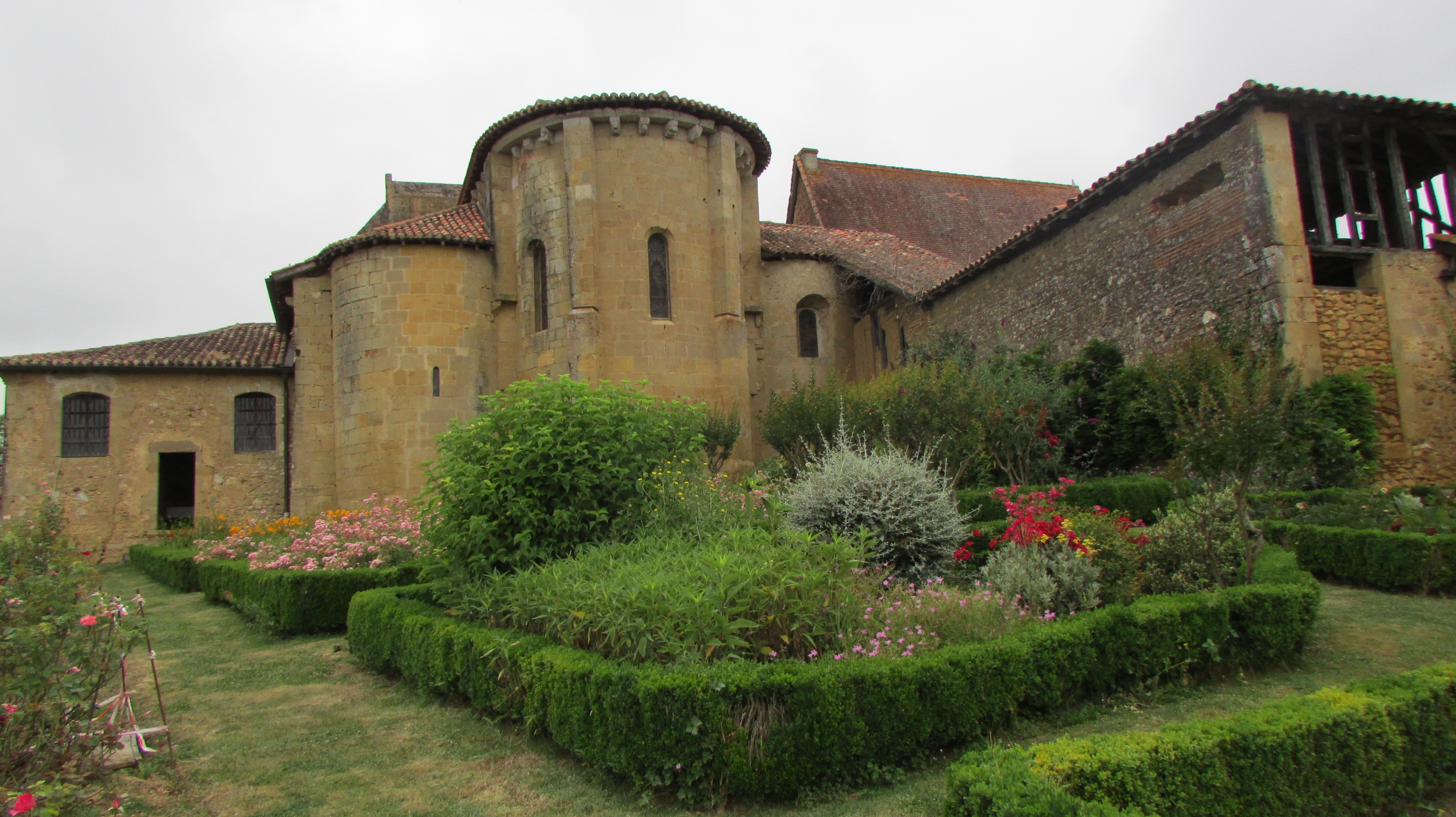
Collegial of Saint Barthélémy in Pimbo.

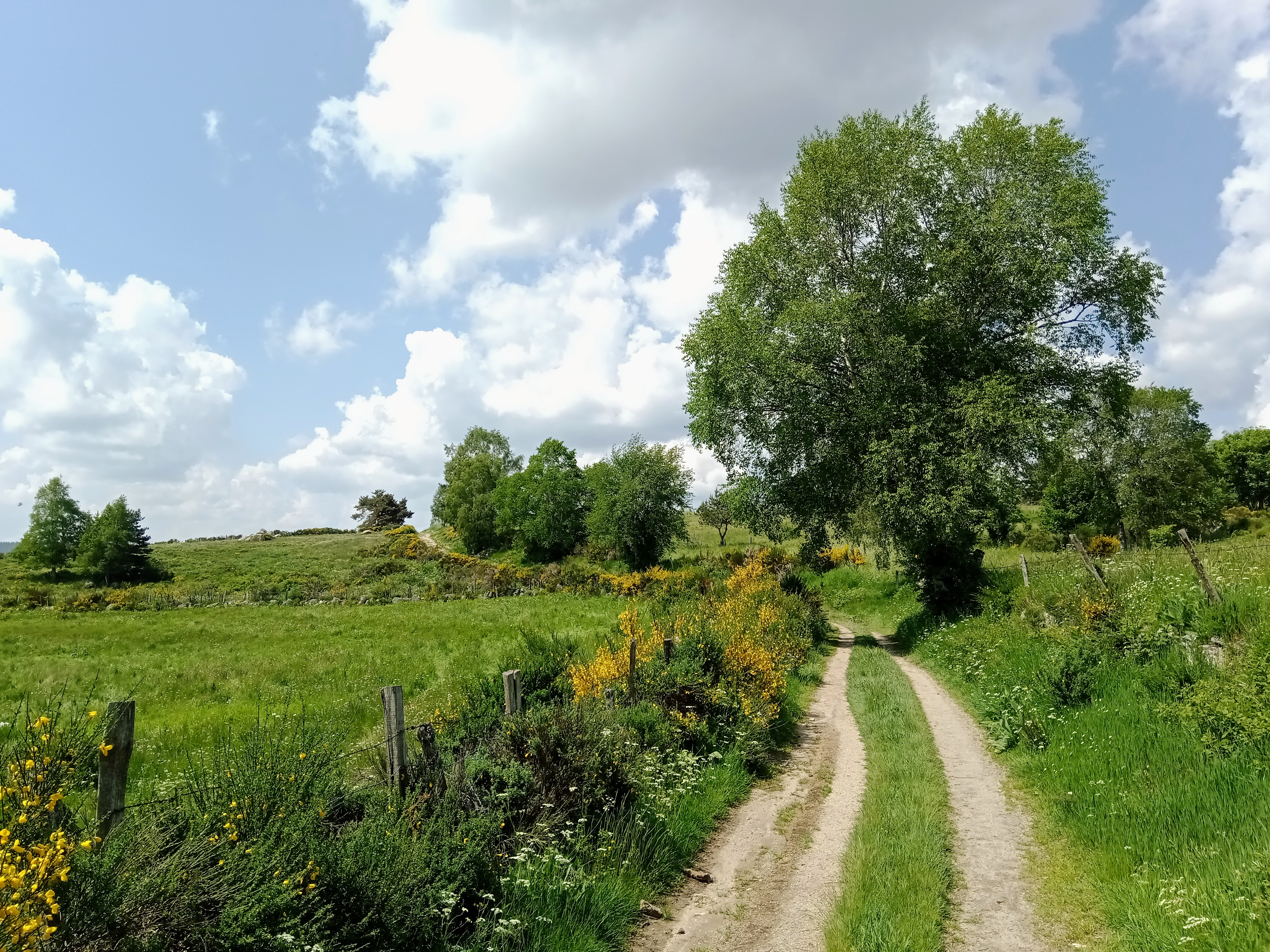
Via Podiensis near Saint-Alban-sur-Limagnole.
