= Montréal, Gers =

Montréal
- Commune
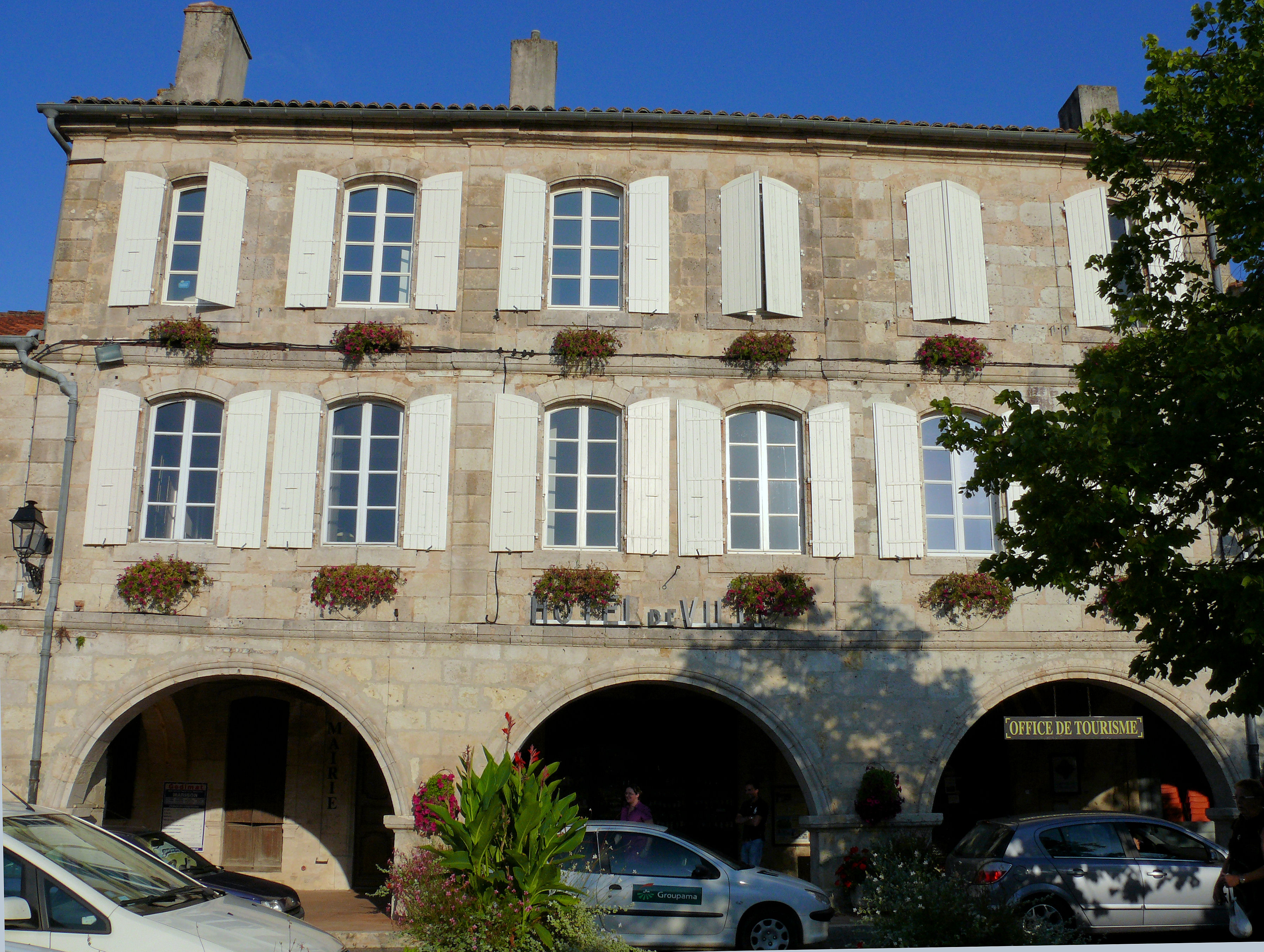
- The town hall in Montréal

- Coat of arms
- Location of Montréal
- Location within France Location within Occitanie
- Coordinates: 43°57′00″N 0°12′01″E
- Country: France
- Region: Occitania
- Department: Gers
- Arrondissement: Condom
- Canton: Armagnac-Ténarèze

Government
  - Mayor (2020–2026): Gérard Bezerra
- Area^{1}: 63.05 km^{2} (24.34 sq mi)
- Highest elevation: 183 m (600 ft)
- Lowest elevation: 73 m (240 ft)
- Population (2023): 1,171
  - Density: 18.57/km^{2} (48.10/sq mi)
- Time zone: UTC+01:00 (CET)
  - Summer (DST): UTC+02:00 (CEST)
- INSEE/Postal code: 32290 /32250
- ^{1} French Land Register data, which excludes lakes, ponds, glaciers > 1 km^{2} (0.386 sq mi or 247 acres) and river estuaries.

Montréal (French pronunciation: [mɔ̃ʁe.al]; historically, Montréal-du-Gers; Gascon: Montrejau de Gers) is a commune in the Gers department in southwestern France. It is a member of Les Plus Beaux Villages de France (The Most Beautiful Villages of France) Association.

== Geography ==
The commune is situated in the Gers but close to the borders with Lot-et-Garonne and Landes. It is built on a promontory on the right bank of the river Auzoue.

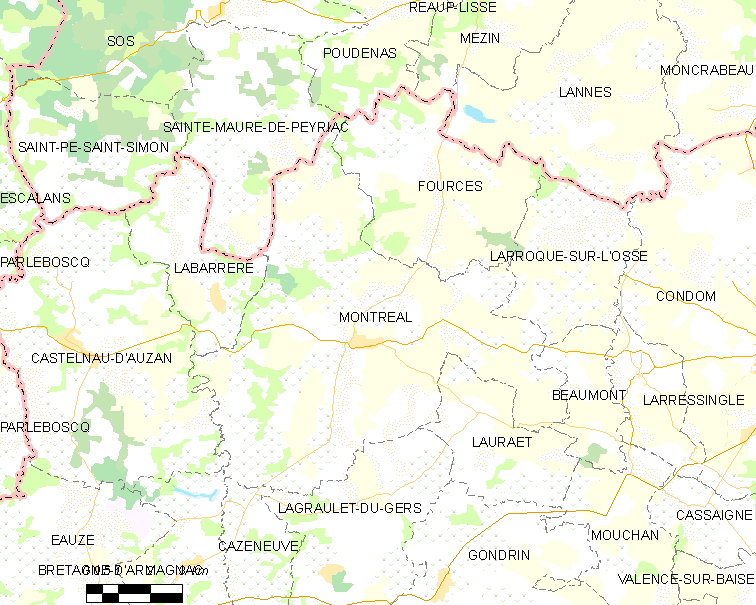
Montréal and its surrounding communes

== Population ==
Historical population
Year	Pop.	±% p.a.
1968	1,714	—
1975	1,493	−1.95%
1982	1,326	−1.68%
1990	1,221	−1.03%
1999	1,238	+0.15%
2007	1,266	+0.28%
2012	1,197	−1.11%
2017	1,168	−0.49%
2023	1,171	+0.04%
Source: INSEE

The inhabitants are called Montréalais in French.

== Sights ==
In the neighbourhood are numerous old castles, medieval walled villages, small towns built around castles and many "sacred" places because the Via Podiensis and the Way of St. James of Compostela which pass through Montréal.

- In the village
  - The Roman Gaul villa at Séviac.
  - The medieval bastide.
- In the surroundings
  - The bastide of Bretagne-d'Armagnac.
  - The Bastide Gasconne of Fourcès.
  - The city of Eauze and its Roman treasure.
  - The fortified village of Larressingle.
  - The museum of D'Artagnan in Lupiac.
  - The Spa of Barbotan-les-Thermes in Cazaubon.
  - The paleontological site discovered in 1987 near Béon hamlet (on the D113 road toward Gondrin, south-east of the village), of international interest - 4 previously unknown species have been discovered there, and a skull from a Palaeomeryx among many other animal parts.

== International relations ==
Montréal is twinned with Wittisheim, Bas-Rhin, France.

== See also ==
- Communes of the Gers department
