= Fourcès =

- Commune
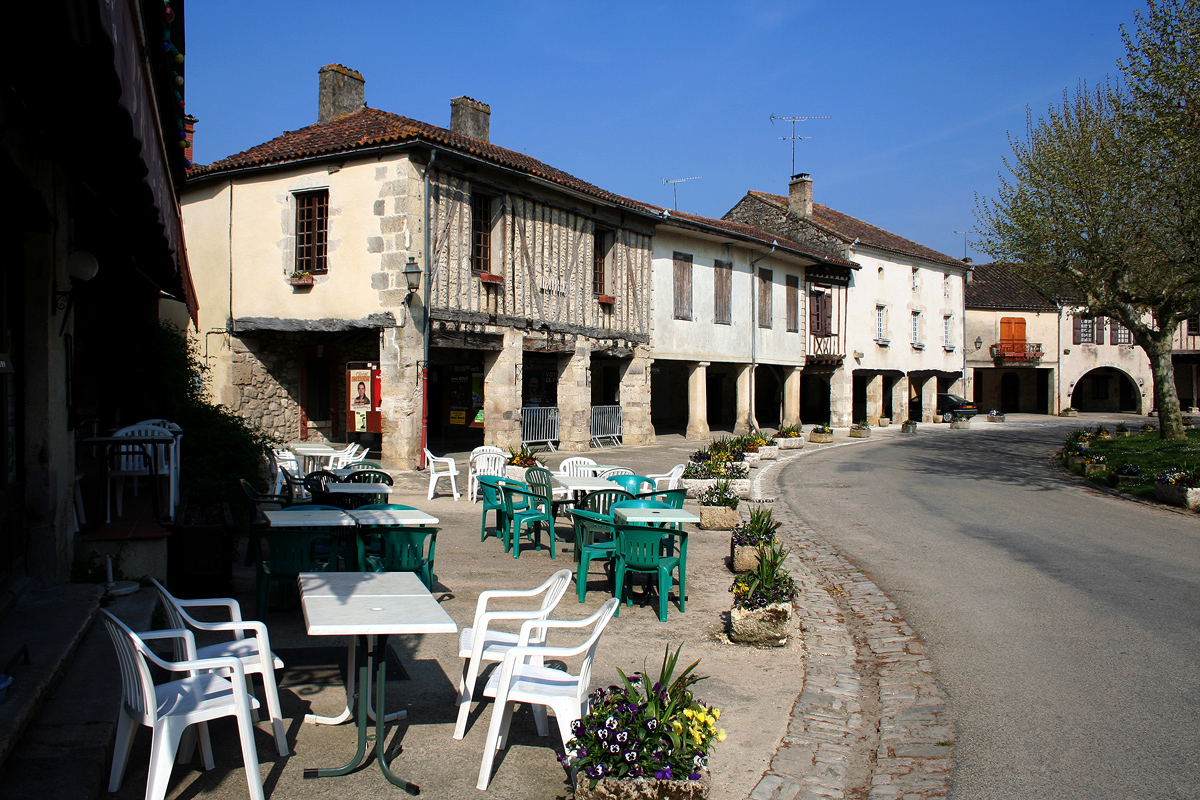
- The village of Fourcès

- Coat of arms
- Location of Fourcès
- Location within France Location within Occitanie
- Coordinates: 43°59′38″N 0°13′51″E
- Country: France
- Region: Occitania
- Department: Gers
- Arrondissement: Condom
- Canton: Armagnac-Ténarèze

Government
  - Mayor (2020–2026): Daniel Bellot
- Area^{1}: 23.72 km^{2} (9.16 sq mi)
- Elevation: 65 m (213 ft)
- Highest elevation: 180 m (590 ft)
- Lowest elevation: 64 m (210 ft)
- Population (2023): 260
  - Density: 11/km^{2} (28/sq mi)
- Time zone: UTC+01:00 (CET)
  - Summer (DST): UTC+02:00 (CEST)
- INSEE/Postal code: 32133 /32250
- ^{1} French Land Register data, which excludes lakes, ponds, glaciers > 1 km^{2} (0.386 sq mi or 247 acres) and river estuaries.

Fourcès is a commune in the Gers department in the Occitanie region in southwestern France known for its circular square. It is a member of Les Plus Beaux Villages de France (The Most Beautiful Villages of France) Association.

== Geography ==
Fourcès lies near Castelnau-d'Auzan and Montréal.

The Auzoue flows north through the middle of the commune. The village lies in the middle of the commune, on the left bank of the Auzoue.

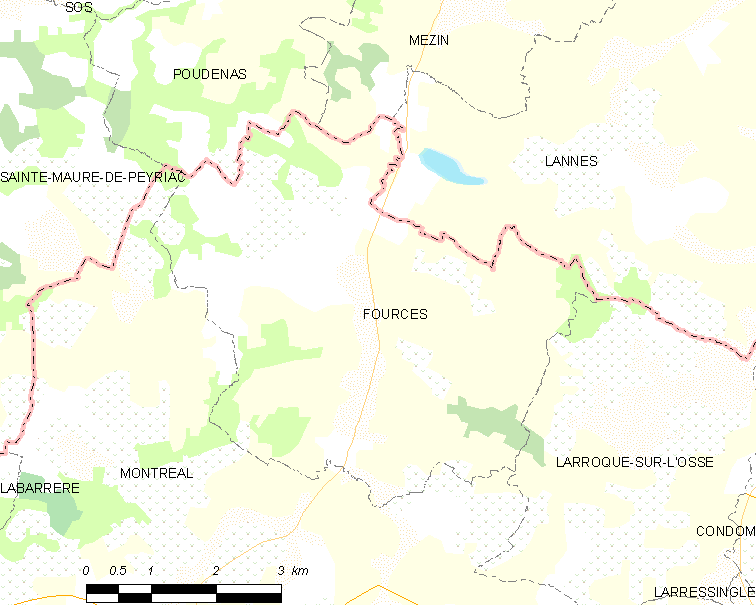
Fourcès and its surrounding communes

== Population ==
Historical population
Year	Pop.	±% p.a.
1968	468	—
1975	372	−3.23%
1982	356	−0.63%
1990	324	−1.17%
1999	277	−1.73%
2007	296	+0.83%
2012	277	−1.32%
2017	260	−1.26%
2023	260	+0.00%
Source: INSEE

== Sights ==
Fourcès is a typical medieval bastide, a little village where the houses are built in a circle to allow a proper defence.

The following are notable sights:

- The arena for the course Landaise for example in Castelnau-d'Auzan.
- Old Armagnac caves.
- The bastide of Bretagne-d'Armagnac.
- The Bastide Gasconne of Fourcès.
- The city of Montréal-du-Gers with a medieval bastide.
- The city of Eauze and its Roman treasure.
- The fortified village of Larressingle.
- The Gallo-Roman villa of Séviac, in Montréal-du-Gers.
- The Ganaderia de Buros.
- The museum of D'Artagnan in Lupiac.
- The Spa of Barbotan-les-Thermes in Cazaubon.

== See also ==
- Communes of the Gers department
