= Canton of Montréal =

Canton of Montréal may refer to two administrative subdivisions of France:

- Canton of Montréal, Aude, in the arrondissement of Cascassonne, Aude
- Canton of Montréal, Gers, in the arrondissement of Condom, Gers
