= Cassaigne =

- Commune
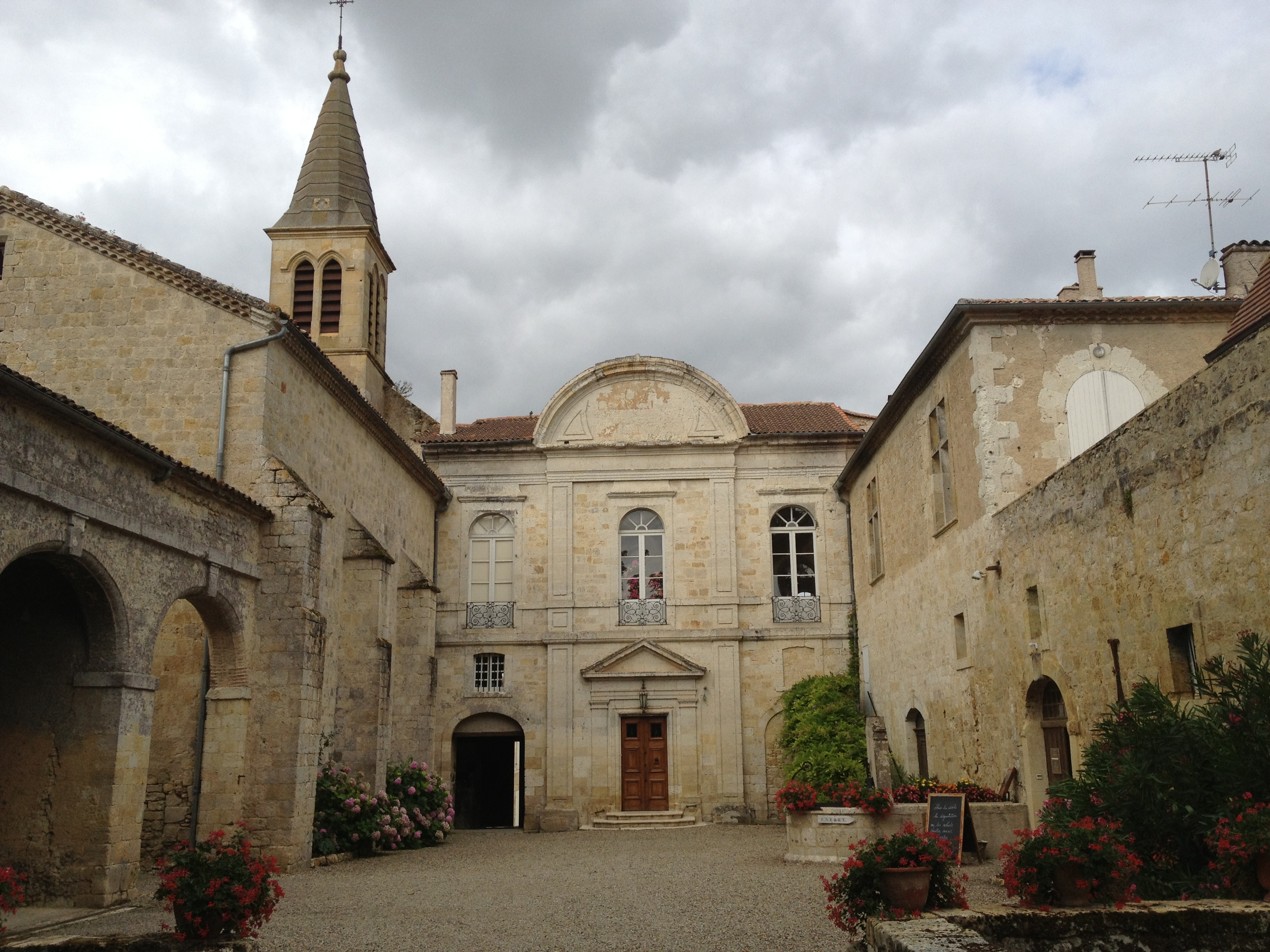
- The chateau in Cassaigne

- Coat of arms
- Location of Cassaigne
- Location within France Location within Occitanie
- Coordinates: 43°54′32″N 0°20′12″E
- Country: France
- Region: Occitania
- Department: Gers
- Arrondissement: Condom
- Canton: Armagnac-Ténarèze
- Intercommunality: Ténarèze

Government
  - Mayor (2022–2026): Sophie Pujos
- Area^{1}: 8.58 km^{2} (3.31 sq mi)
- Elevation: 104 m (341 ft)
- Highest elevation: 168 m (551 ft)
- Lowest elevation: 74 m (243 ft)
- Population (2023): 225
  - Density: 26.2/km^{2} (67.9/sq mi)
- Time zone: UTC+01:00 (CET)
  - Summer (DST): UTC+02:00 (CEST)
- INSEE/Postal code: 32075 /32100
- ^{1} French Land Register data, which excludes lakes, ponds, glaciers > 1 km^{2} (0.386 sq mi or 247 acres) and river estuaries.

Cassaigne (French pronunciation: [kasɛɲ]; Occitan: Cassanha) is a commune in the Gers department in southwestern France.

== Geography ==
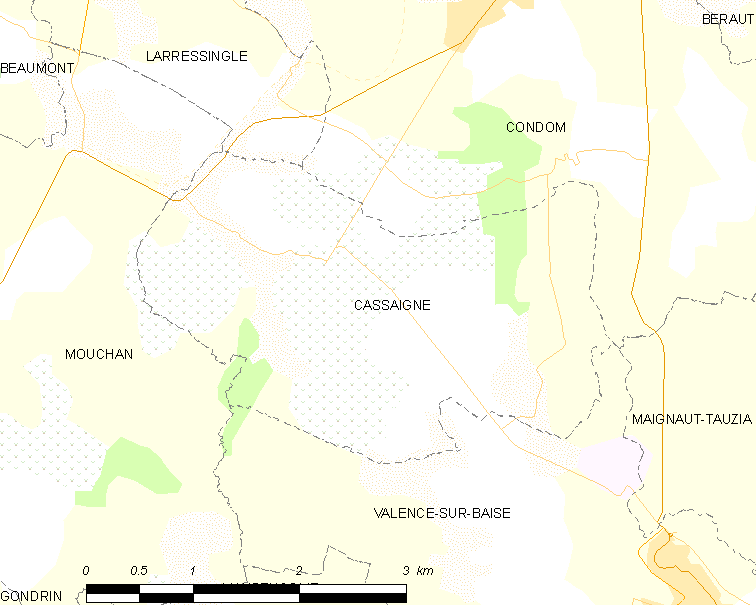
Cassaigne and its surrounding communes

== Population ==
Historical population
Year	Pop.	±% p.a.
1968	202	—
1975	172	−2.27%
1982	169	−0.25%
1990	201	+2.19%
1999	186	−0.86%
2007	198	+0.78%
2012	228	+2.86%
2017	221	−0.62%
2023	225	+0.30%
Source: INSEE

== See also ==
- Communes of the Gers department
