= Mouchan =

- Commune
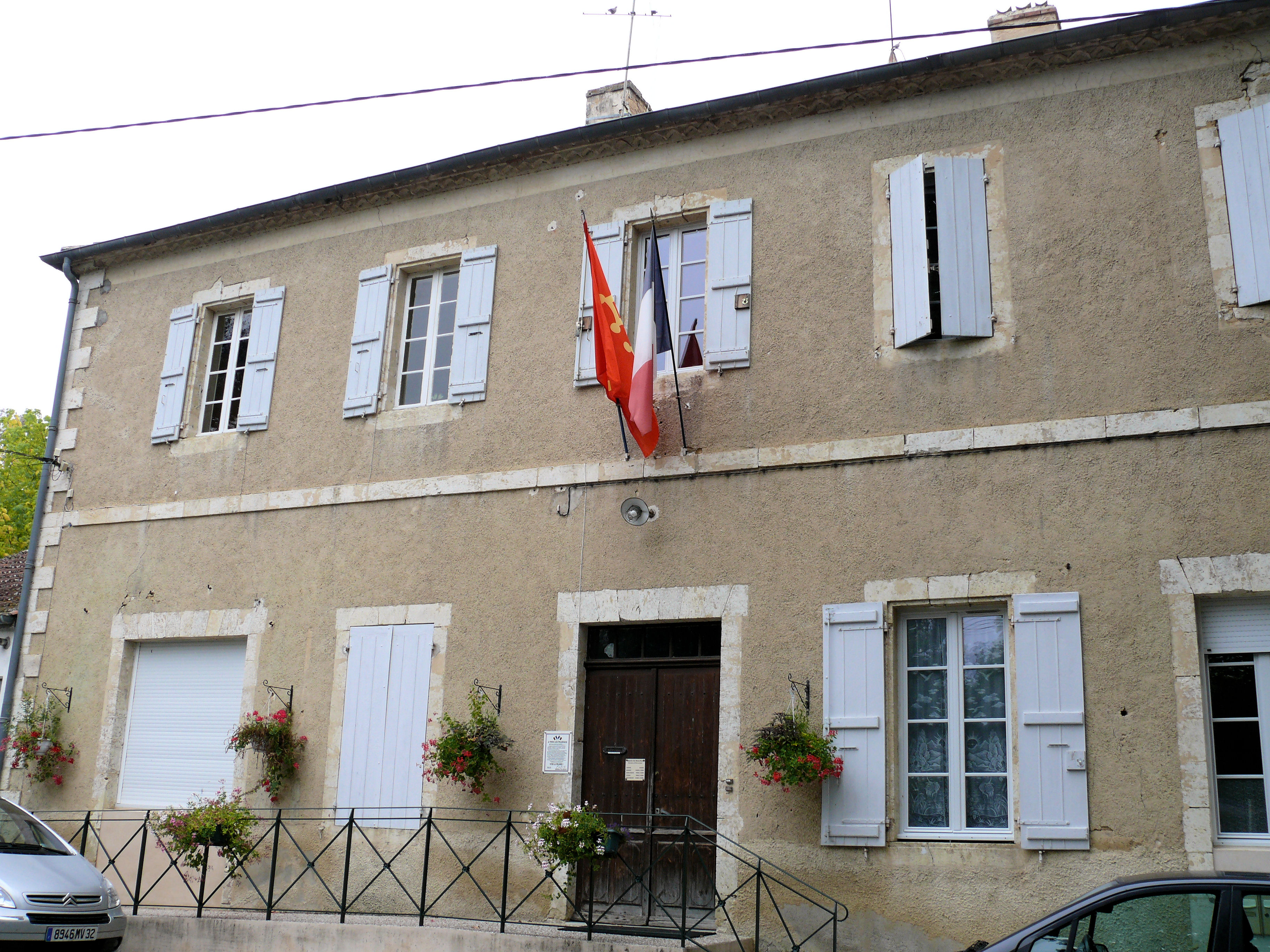
- Town hall

- Coat of arms
- Location of Mouchan
- Location within France Location within Occitanie
- Coordinates: 43°54′19″N 0°18′00″E
- Country: France
- Region: Occitania
- Department: Gers
- Arrondissement: Condom
- Canton: Armagnac-Ténarèze
- Intercommunality: Ténarèze

Government
  - Mayor (2020–2026): Christian Touhé-Rumeau
- Area^{1}: 13.11 km^{2} (5.06 sq mi)
- Elevation: 94 m (308 ft)
- Highest elevation: 185 m (607 ft)
- Lowest elevation: 77 m (253 ft)
- Population (2023): 376
  - Density: 28.7/km^{2} (74.3/sq mi)
- Time zone: UTC+01:00 (CET)
  - Summer (DST): UTC+02:00 (CEST)
- INSEE/Postal code: 32292 /32330
- ^{1} French Land Register data, which excludes lakes, ponds, glaciers > 1 km^{2} (0.386 sq mi or 247 acres) and river estuaries.

Mouchan (French pronunciation: [muʃɑ̃]; Occitan: Moishan) is a commune in the Gers department in southwestern France.

== Geography ==
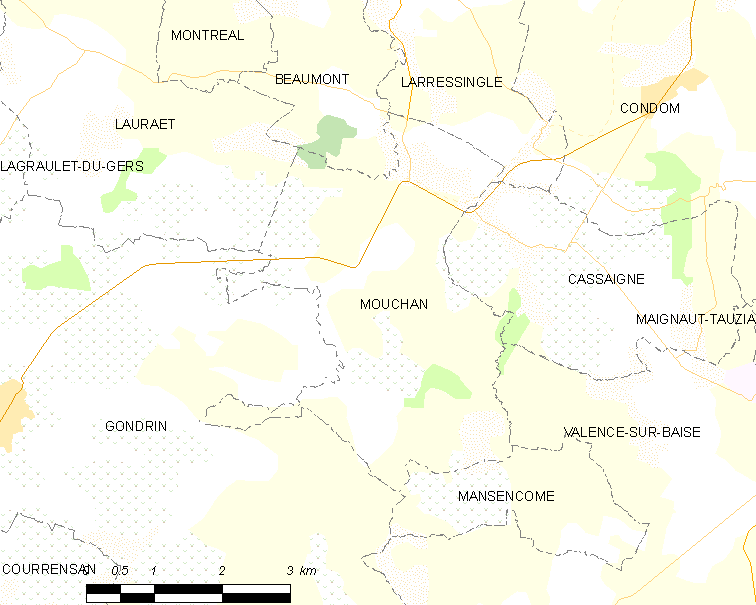
Mouchan and its surrounding communes

== Population ==
Historical population
Year	Pop.	±% p.a.
1968	440	—
1975	385	−1.89%
1982	340	−1.76%
1990	364	+0.86%
1999	365	+0.03%
2007	417	+1.68%
2012	447	+1.40%
2017	406	−1.91%
2023	376	−1.27%
Source: INSEE

== See also ==
- Communes of the Gers department
