= Château de Larressingle =

Ruined castle in Occitania, France

Coordinates: 43°56′38″N 0°18′40″E

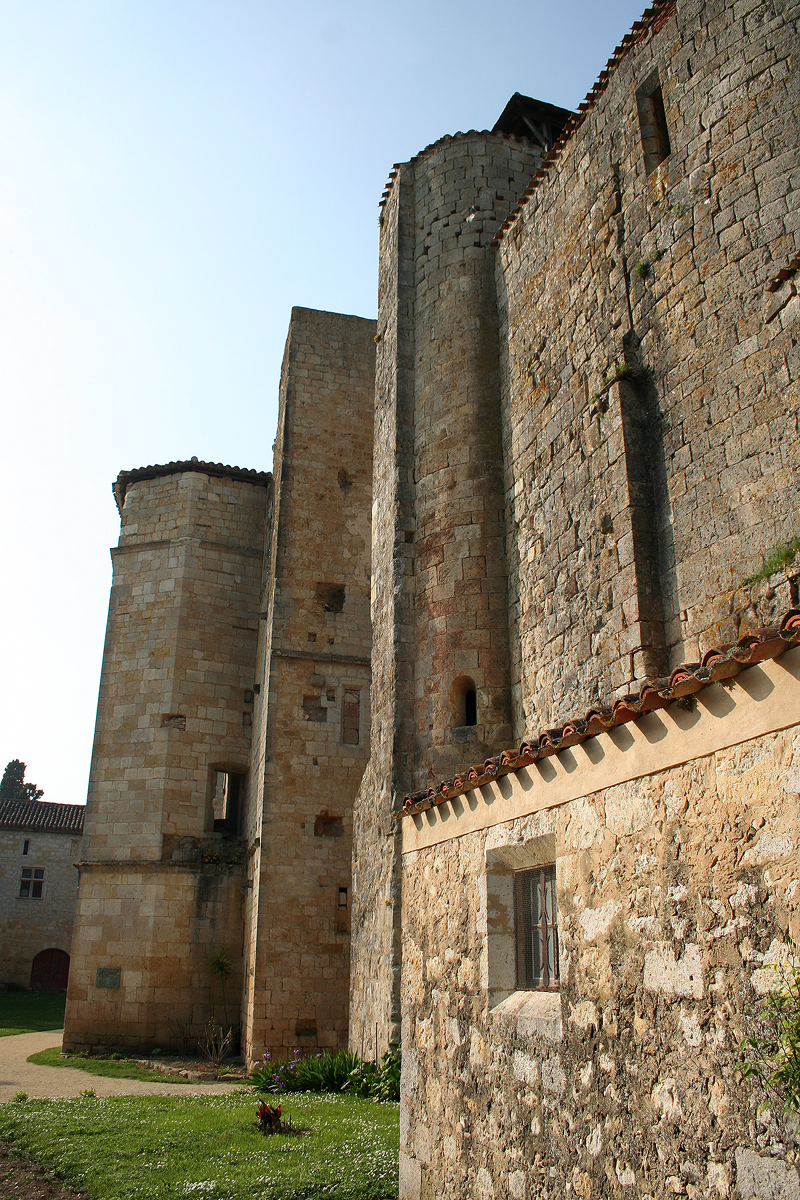

The Château de Larressingle is a ruined castle in the commune of Larressingle in the Gers département of France.

The castle was built in the second half of the 13th century. The second and third floors were added by Arnaud Orthon de Lomagne, Bishop of Condom, between 1285 and 1305. Windows were added at various times in the 15th and 16th centuries, particularly between 1521 and 1545 when extra was done for Monseigneur de Grossolles, including the construction of a hexagonal tower.

The ruins have been listed since 1922 as a monument historique by the French Ministry of Culture.

== See also ==
- List of castles in France
