= Cazeneuve, Gers =

Cazeneuve
- Commune
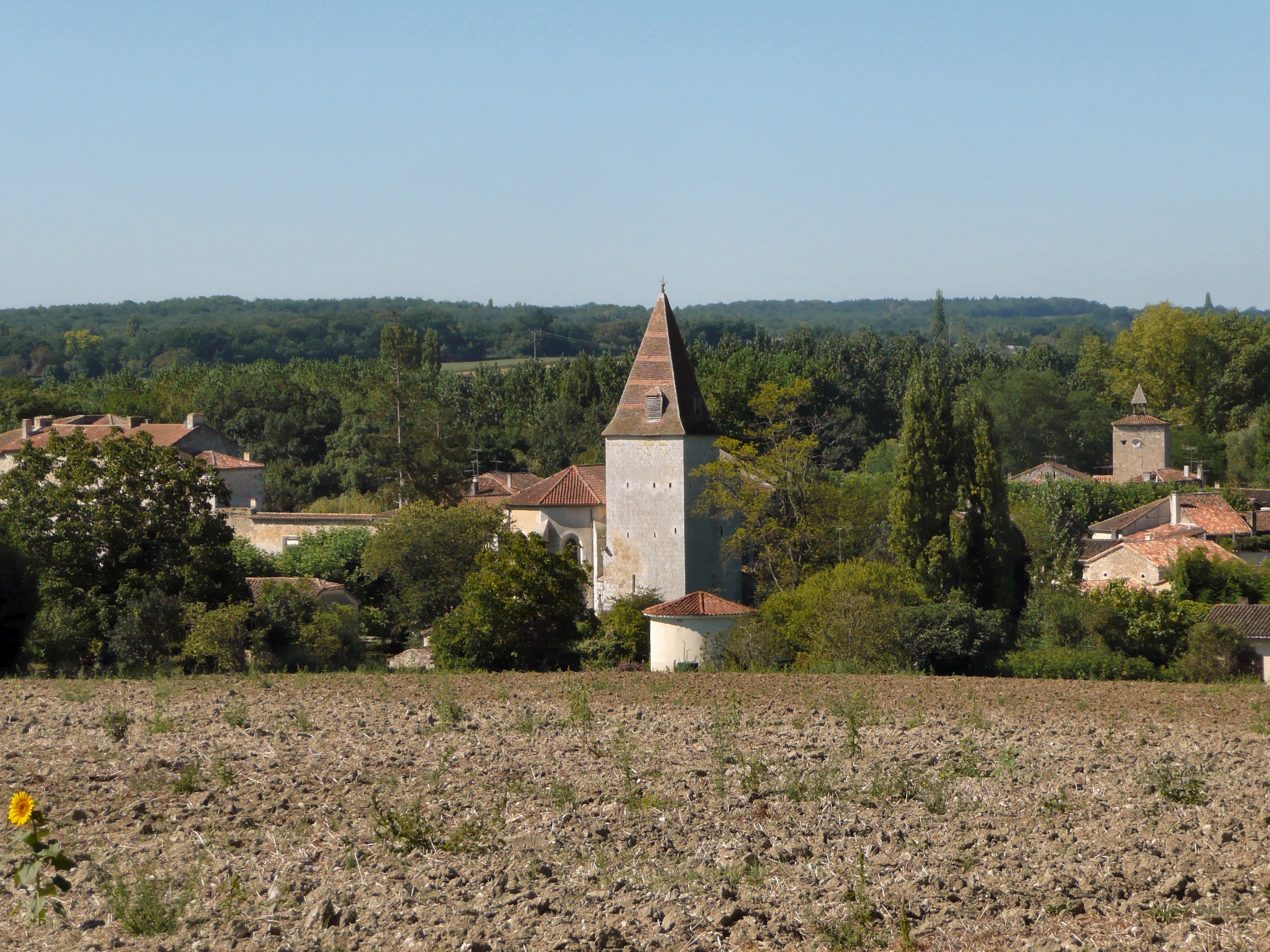
- A general view of Cazeneuve
- Location of Cazeneuve
- Location within France Location within Occitanie
- Coordinates: 43°53′13″N 0°09′45″E
- Country: France
- Region: Occitania
- Department: Gers
- Arrondissement: Condom
- Canton: Armagnac-Ténarèze

Government
  - Mayor (2020–2026): Martine Laborde
- Area^{1}: 8.31 km^{2} (3.21 sq mi)
- Elevation: 250 m (820 ft)
- Highest elevation: 177 m (581 ft)
- Lowest elevation: 103 m (338 ft)
- Population (2023): 157
  - Density: 18.9/km^{2} (48.9/sq mi)
- Time zone: UTC+01:00 (CET)
  - Summer (DST): UTC+02:00 (CEST)
- INSEE/Postal code: 32100 /32800
- ^{1} French Land Register data, which excludes lakes, ponds, glaciers > 1 km^{2} (0.386 sq mi or 247 acres) and river estuaries.

Cazeneuve (French pronunciation: [kaznœv]; Occitan: Casanava) is a commune in the Gers department in southwestern France.

Since 2015, the commune is a part of the Canton of Armagnac-Ténarèze.

In the neighbourhood are numerous old castles, little medieval walled villages, small cities built around castles and "sacred" places, because the Via Podiensis and the Way of St. James of Compostela are going through the Montréal and left their traces.

== Geography ==
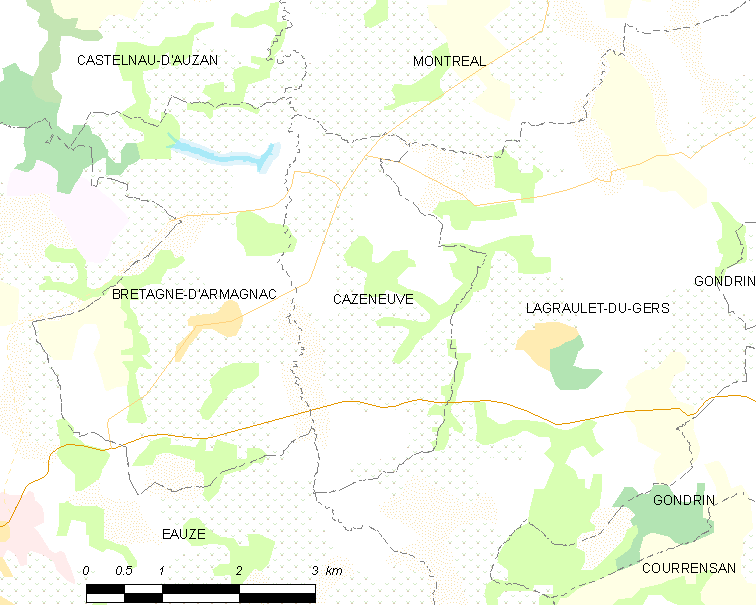
Cazeneuve and its surrounding communes

== Population ==
Historical population
Year	Pop.	±% p.a.
1968	205	—
1975	178	−2.00%
1982	138	−3.57%
1990	139	+0.09%
1999	127	−1.00%
2007	132	+0.48%
2012	143	+1.61%
2017	148	+0.69%
2023	157	+0.99%
Source: INSEE

== See also ==
- Communes of the Gers department
