= Larroque-sur-l'Osse =

- Commune
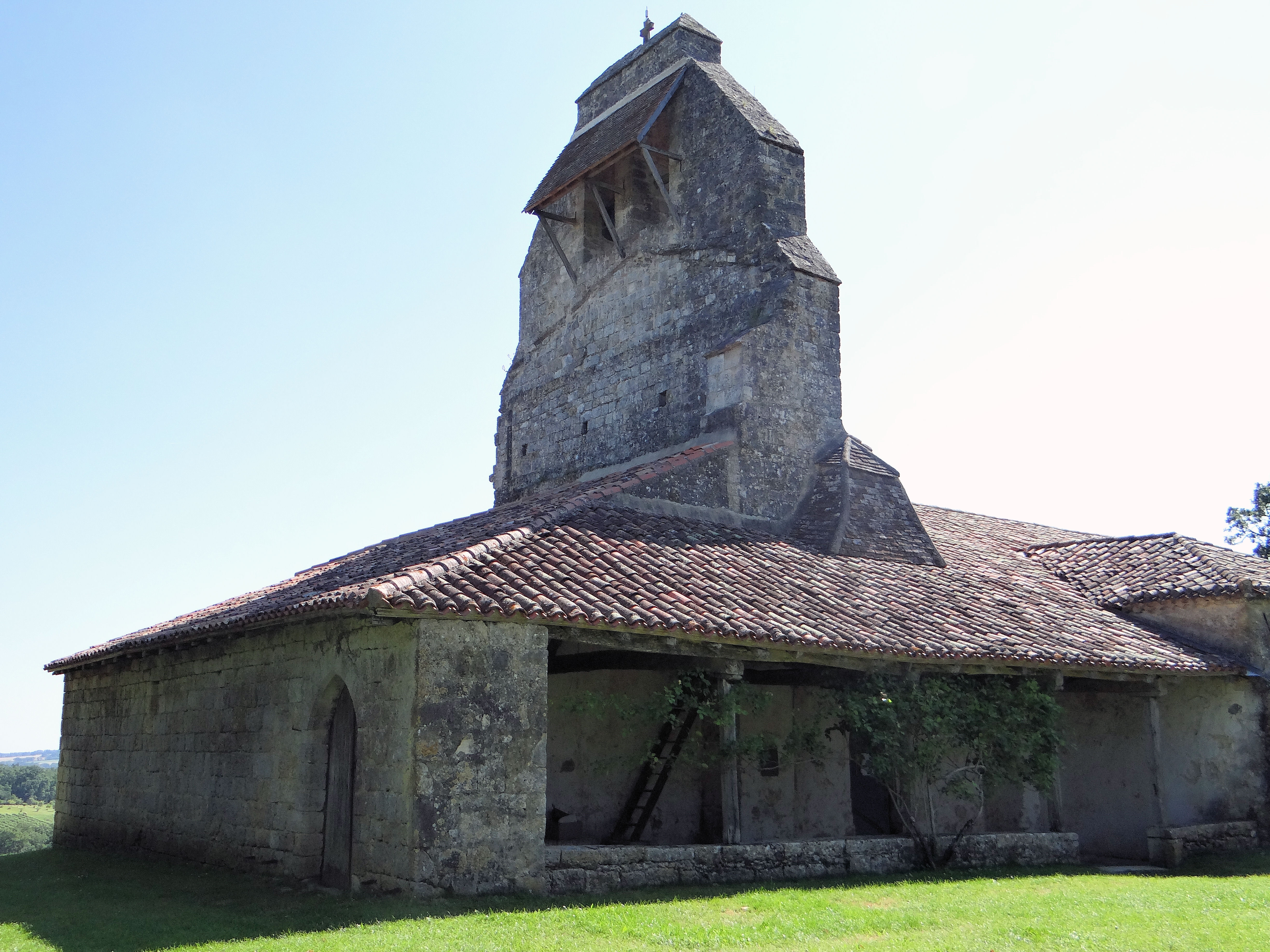
- The church in Larroque-sur-l'Osse
- Location of Larroque-sur-l'Osse
- Location within France Location within Occitanie
- Coordinates: 43°58′19″N 0°16′31″E
- Country: France
- Region: Occitania
- Department: Gers
- Arrondissement: Condom
- Canton: Armagnac-Ténarèze

Government
  - Mayor (2020–2026): Patricia Esperon
- Area^{1}: 15.07 km^{2} (5.82 sq mi)
- Elevation: 132 m (433 ft)
- Highest elevation: 171 m (561 ft)
- Lowest elevation: 70 m (230 ft)
- Population (2023): 213
  - Density: 14.1/km^{2} (36.6/sq mi)
- Time zone: UTC+01:00 (CET)
  - Summer (DST): UTC+02:00 (CEST)
- INSEE/Postal code: 32197 /32100
- ^{1} French Land Register data, which excludes lakes, ponds, glaciers > 1 km^{2} (0.386 sq mi or 247 acres) and river estuaries.

Larroque-sur-l'Osse (French pronunciation: [laʁɔk syʁ lɔs], lit. 'Larroque on the Osse'; Occitan: La Ròca d'Òssa) is a commune in the Gers department in southwestern France.

== Geography ==
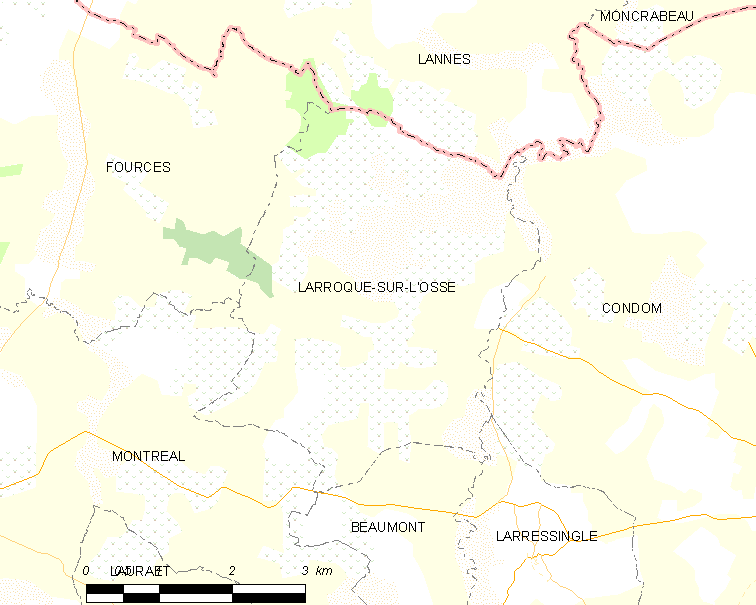
Larroque-sur-l'Osse and its surrounding communes

== Population ==
Historical population
Year	Pop.	±% p.a.
1968	350	—
1975	270	−3.64%
1982	258	−0.65%
1990	254	−0.20%
1999	226	−1.29%
2007	203	−1.33%
2012	231	+2.62%
2017	236	+0.43%
2023	213	−1.69%
Source: INSEE

== See also ==
- Communes of the Gers department
