= Uhart-Mixe =

Uhart-Mixe Uharte-Hiri (Basque)
- Commune
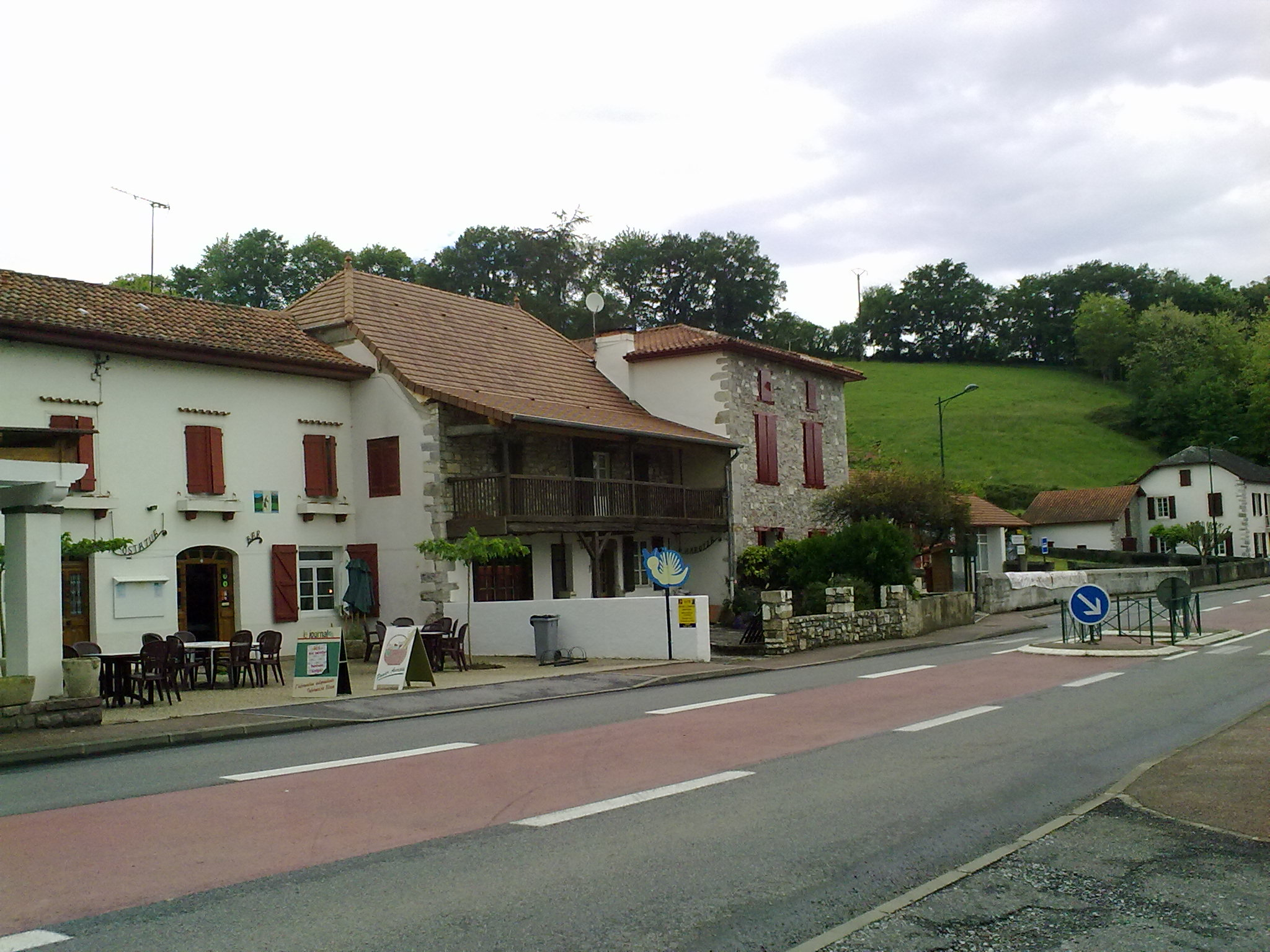
- The village of Uhart-Mixe

- Coat of arms
- Location of Uhart-Mixe
- Location within France Location within Nouvelle-Aquitaine
- Coordinates: 43°16′48″N 1°01′15″W
- Country: France
- Region: Nouvelle-Aquitaine
- Department: Pyrénées-Atlantiques
- Arrondissement: Bayonne
- Canton: Pays de Bidache, Amikuze et Ostibarre
- Intercommunality: CA Pays Basque

Government
  - Mayor (2020–2026): Bertrand Joseph Ithurbide
- Area^{1}: 11.74 km^{2} (4.53 sq mi)
- Elevation: 86 m (282 ft)
- Highest elevation: 304 m (997 ft)
- Lowest elevation: 60 m (200 ft)
- Population (2023): 213
  - Density: 18.1/km^{2} (47.0/sq mi)
- Time zone: UTC+01:00 (CET)
  - Summer (DST): UTC+02:00 (CEST)
- INSEE/Postal code: 64539 /64120
- ^{1} French Land Register data, which excludes lakes, ponds, glaciers > 1 km^{2} (0.386 sq mi or 247 acres) and river estuaries.

Uhart-Mixe (French pronunciation: [yaʁ miks]; Occitan: Uhart-Miça; Basque: Uhartehiri [uhaʁ̞tehiʁ̞i]) is a commune in the Pyrénées-Atlantiques department in south-western France.

It is located in the former province of Lower Navarre.

== See also ==
- Communes of the Pyrénées-Atlantiques department
