= Nasbinals =

- Commune
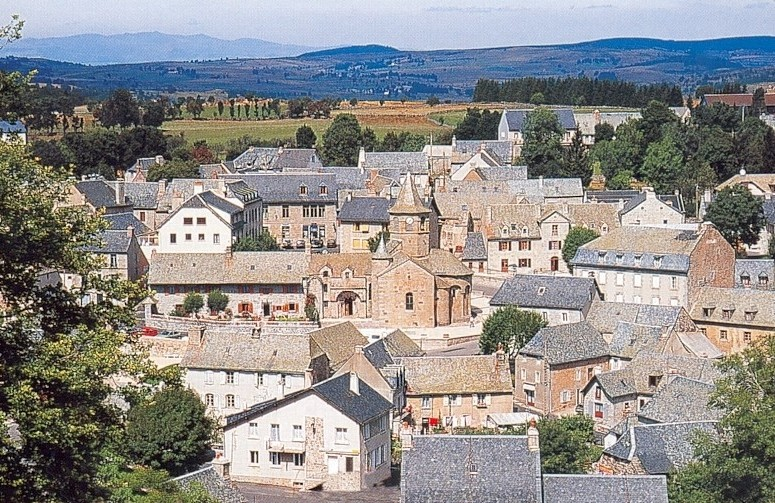
- The church and surrounding buildings, in Nasbinals

- Coat of arms
- Location of Nasbinals
- Location within France Location within Occitanie
- Coordinates: 44°39′47″N 3°02′50″E
- Country: France
- Region: Occitania
- Department: Lozère
- Arrondissement: Mende
- Canton: Peyre en Aubrac
- Intercommunality: Hautes Terres de l'Aubrac

Government
  - Mayor (2020–2026): Bernard Bastide
- Area^{1}: 63.64 km^{2} (24.57 sq mi)
- Highest elevation: 1,386 m (4,547 ft)
- Lowest elevation: 1,080 m (3,540 ft)
- Population (2023): 571
  - Density: 8.97/km^{2} (23.2/sq mi)
- Time zone: UTC+01:00 (CET)
  - Summer (DST): UTC+02:00 (CEST)
- INSEE/Postal code: 48104 /48260
- ^{1} French Land Register data, which excludes lakes, ponds, glaciers > 1 km^{2} (0.386 sq mi or 247 acres) and river estuaries.

Nasbinals (French pronunciation: [nasbinal]; Occitan: Las Binals) is a commune in the departement of Lozère, Occitania, southern France.

== Climate ==
Climate data for Nasbinals (1981–2010 averages, 1978–2019 extremes): elevation 1284m
Month	Jan	Feb	Mar	Apr	May	Jun	Jul	Aug	Sep	Oct	Nov	Dec	Year
Record high °C (°F)	17.4 (63.3)	17.2 (63.0)	18.8 (65.8)	22.8 (73.0)	25.2 (77.4)	30.0 (86.0)	33.3 (91.9)	31.8 (89.2)	27.8 (82.0)	23.0 (73.4)	21.6 (70.9)	18.7 (65.7)	33.3 (91.9)
Mean daily maximum °C (°F)	2.0 (35.6)	2.5 (36.5)	5.4 (41.7)	8.4 (47.1)	13.3 (55.9)	17.3 (63.1)	20.6 (69.1)	20.1 (68.2)	16.2 (61.2)	11.5 (52.7)	5.6 (42.1)	3.0 (37.4)	10.5 (50.9)
Daily mean °C (°F)	−1.2 (29.8)	−1.0 (30.2)	1.6 (34.9)	4.1 (39.4)	8.5 (47.3)	12.1 (53.8)	14.8 (58.6)	14.5 (58.1)	11.0 (51.8)	7.5 (45.5)	2.3 (36.1)	−0.2 (31.6)	6.2 (43.1)
Mean daily minimum °C (°F)	−4.4 (24.1)	−4.4 (24.1)	−2.3 (27.9)	−0.2 (31.6)	3.7 (38.7)	6.9 (44.4)	8.9 (48.0)	8.9 (48.0)	5.9 (42.6)	3.5 (38.3)	−1.0 (30.2)	−3.4 (25.9)	1.8 (35.3)
Record low °C (°F)	−25.0 (−13.0)	−23.0 (−9.4)	−19.7 (−3.5)	−10.9 (12.4)	−7.1 (19.2)	−3.8 (25.2)	0.3 (32.5)	−1.0 (30.2)	−4.0 (24.8)	−11.9 (10.6)	−16.1 (3.0)	−18.6 (−1.5)	−25.0 (−13.0)
Average precipitation mm (inches)	135.7 (5.34)	117.6 (4.63)	119.2 (4.69)	140.9 (5.55)	135.4 (5.33)	110.9 (4.37)	75.5 (2.97)	97.7 (3.85)	137.2 (5.40)	180.6 (7.11)	163.5 (6.44)	162.0 (6.38)	1,576.2 (62.06)
Source: Meteociel

== See also ==
- Communes of the Lozère department
