= Beaumont, Gers =

Beaumont
- Commune
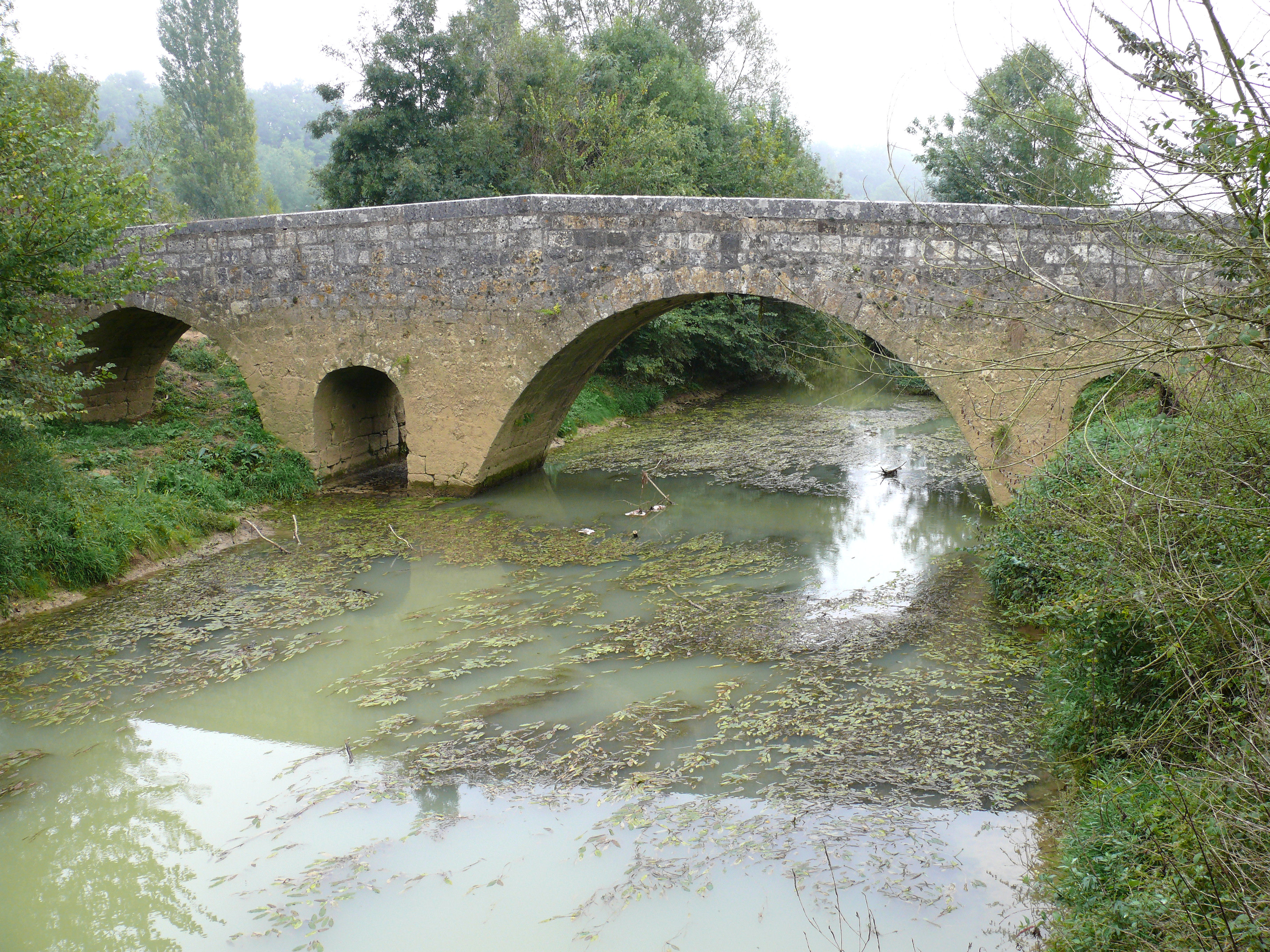
- Bridge over the Artigue

- Coat of arms
- Location of Beaumont
- Location within France Location within Occitanie
- Coordinates: 43°56′50″N 0°17′10″E
- Country: France
- Region: Occitania
- Department: Gers
- Arrondissement: Condom
- Canton: Armagnac-Ténarèze
- Intercommunality: Ténarèze

Government
  - Mayor (2020–2026): Annie Dhainaut
- Area^{1}: 7.56 km^{2} (2.92 sq mi)
- Highest elevation: 152 m (499 ft)
- Lowest elevation: 76 m (249 ft)
- Population (2023): 122
  - Density: 16.1/km^{2} (41.8/sq mi)
- Time zone: UTC+01:00 (CET)
  - Summer (DST): UTC+02:00 (CEST)
- INSEE/Postal code: 32037 /32100
- ^{1} French Land Register data, which excludes lakes, ponds, glaciers > 1 km^{2} (0.386 sq mi or 247 acres) and river estuaries.

Beaumont (French pronunciation: [bomɔ̃]; Occitan: Bèumont) is a commune in the Gers department in southwestern France.

== Geography ==
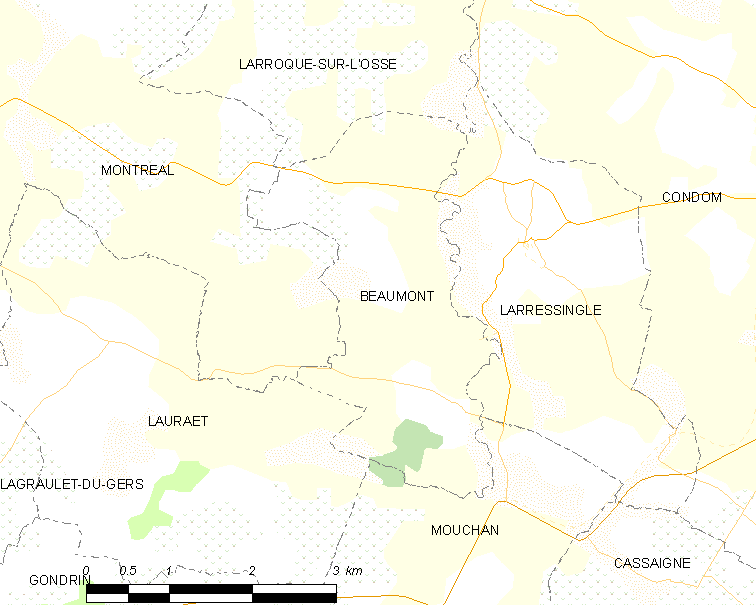
Beaumont and its surrounding communes

== Population ==
Historical population
Year	Pop.	±% p.a.
1968	144	—
1975	139	−0.50%
1982	105	−3.93%
1990	114	+1.03%
1999	112	−0.20%
2007	114	+0.22%
2012	144	+4.78%
2017	136	−1.14%
2023	122	−1.79%
Source: INSEE

== Sites of interest ==
The Château de Beaumont was constructed in the 14th century. Significant building work was carried out in the 15th, 17th and 18th centuries.

The Compostela pilgrimage route runs through the village passing by the castle and through the rough trails around it.

== See also ==
- Communes of the Gers department
