= Pimbo =

- Commune
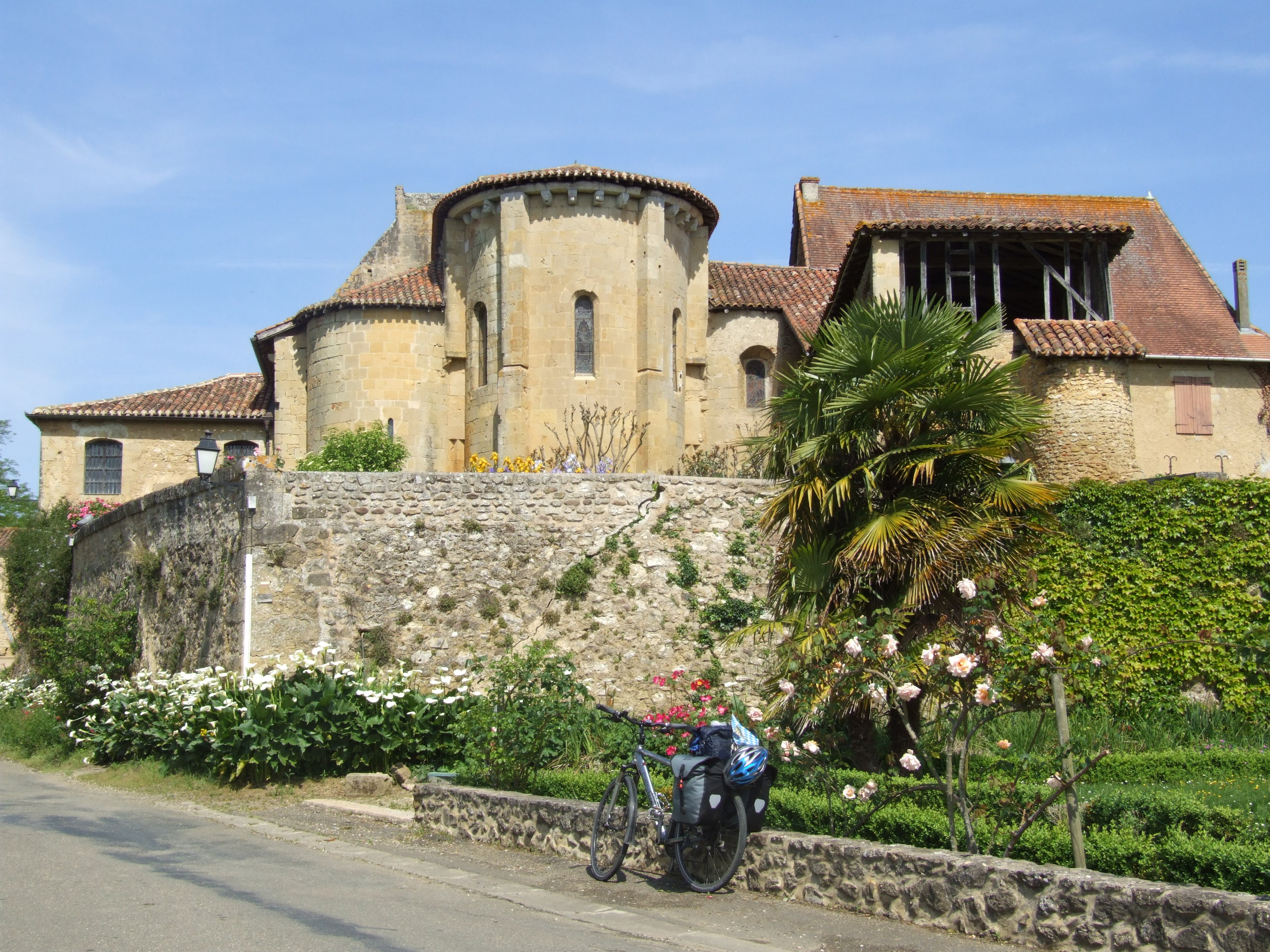
- Saint-Barthélemy collegiate church

- Coat of arms
- Location of Pimbo
- Location within France Location within Nouvelle-Aquitaine
- Coordinates: 43°34′37″N 0°22′36″W
- Country: France
- Region: Nouvelle-Aquitaine
- Department: Landes
- Arrondissement: Mont-de-Marsan
- Canton: Chalosse Tursan
- Intercommunality: Chalosse Tursan

Government
  - Mayor (2020–2026): André Passicos
- Area^{1}: 10.89 km^{2} (4.20 sq mi)
- Highest elevation: 213 m (699 ft)
- Lowest elevation: 100 m (330 ft)
- Population (2023): 195
  - Density: 17.9/km^{2} (46.4/sq mi)
- Time zone: UTC+01:00 (CET)
  - Summer (DST): UTC+02:00 (CEST)
- INSEE/Postal code: 40226 /40320
- ^{1} French Land Register data, which excludes lakes, ponds, glaciers > 1 km^{2} (0.386 sq mi or 247 acres) and river estuaries.

Pimbo (French pronunciation: [pɛ̃bo]) is a commune in the Landes department in Nouvelle-Aquitaine in southwestern France.

== Population ==
Historical population
Year	Pop.	±% p.a.
1968	229	—
1975	224	−0.31%
1982	195	−1.96%
1990	181	−0.93%
1999	179	−0.12%
2007	185	+0.41%
2012	196	+1.16%
2017	210	+1.39%
2023	195	−1.23%
Source: INSEE

== See also ==
- Communes of the Landes department
