= Canton of Armagnac-Ténarèze =

Administrative division of Gers department, France

Coordinates: 43.86°N 0.10°E

The canton of Armagnac-Ténarèze is an administrative division of the Gers department, southwestern France. It was created at the French canton reorganisation which came into effect in March 2015. Its seat is in Eauze.

It consists of the following communes:

1. Beaumont
2. Bretagne-d'Armagnac
3. Castelnau-d'Auzan-Labarrère
4. Cassaigne
5. Cazeneuve
6. Eauze
7. Fourcès
8. Gondrin
9. Lagraulet-du-Gers
10. Larressingle
11. Larroque-sur-l'Osse
12. Lauraët
13. Mansencôme
14. Montréal
15. Mouchan
