= Lauraët =

- Commune
- Coat of arms
- Location of Lauraët
- Location within France Location within Occitanie
- Coordinates: 43°56′07″N 0°15′00″E
- Country: France
- Region: Occitania
- Department: Gers
- Arrondissement: Condom
- Canton: Armagnac-Ténarèze

Government
  - Mayor (2020–2026): Bernard Marseillan
- Area^{1}: 12.71 km^{2} (4.91 sq mi)
- Highest elevation: 177 m (581 ft)
- Lowest elevation: 88 m (289 ft)
- Population (2023): 245
  - Density: 19.3/km^{2} (49.9/sq mi)
- Time zone: UTC+01:00 (CET)
  - Summer (DST): UTC+02:00 (CEST)
- INSEE/Postal code: 32203 /32330
- ^{1} French Land Register data, which excludes lakes, ponds, glaciers > 1 km^{2} (0.386 sq mi or 247 acres) and river estuaries.

Lauraët is a commune in the Gers department in southwestern France.

== Geography ==
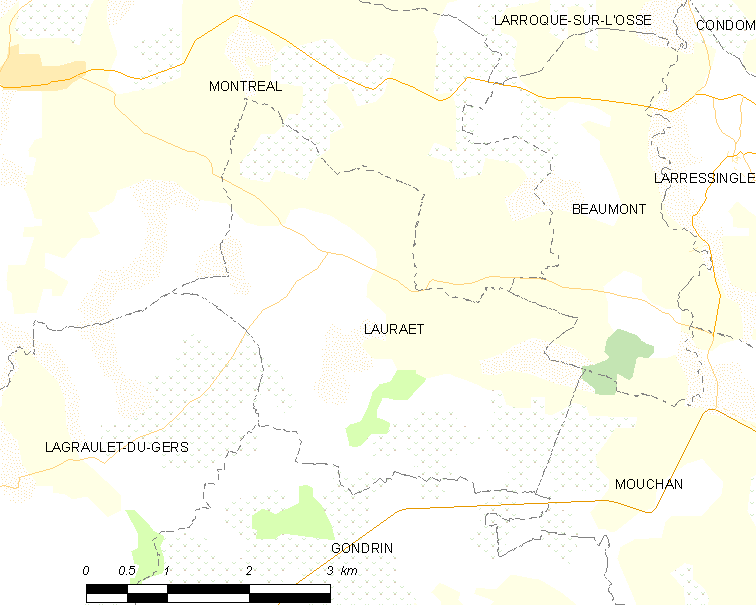
Lauraët and its surrounding communes

== Population ==
Historical population
Year	Pop.	±% p.a.
1968	300	—
1975	253	−2.40%
1982	220	−1.98%
1990	215	−0.29%
1999	207	−0.42%
2007	244	+2.08%
2012	247	+0.24%
2017	252	+0.40%
2023	245	−0.47%
Source: INSEE

== See also ==
- Communes of the Gers department
