= Lagraulet-du-Gers =

- Commune
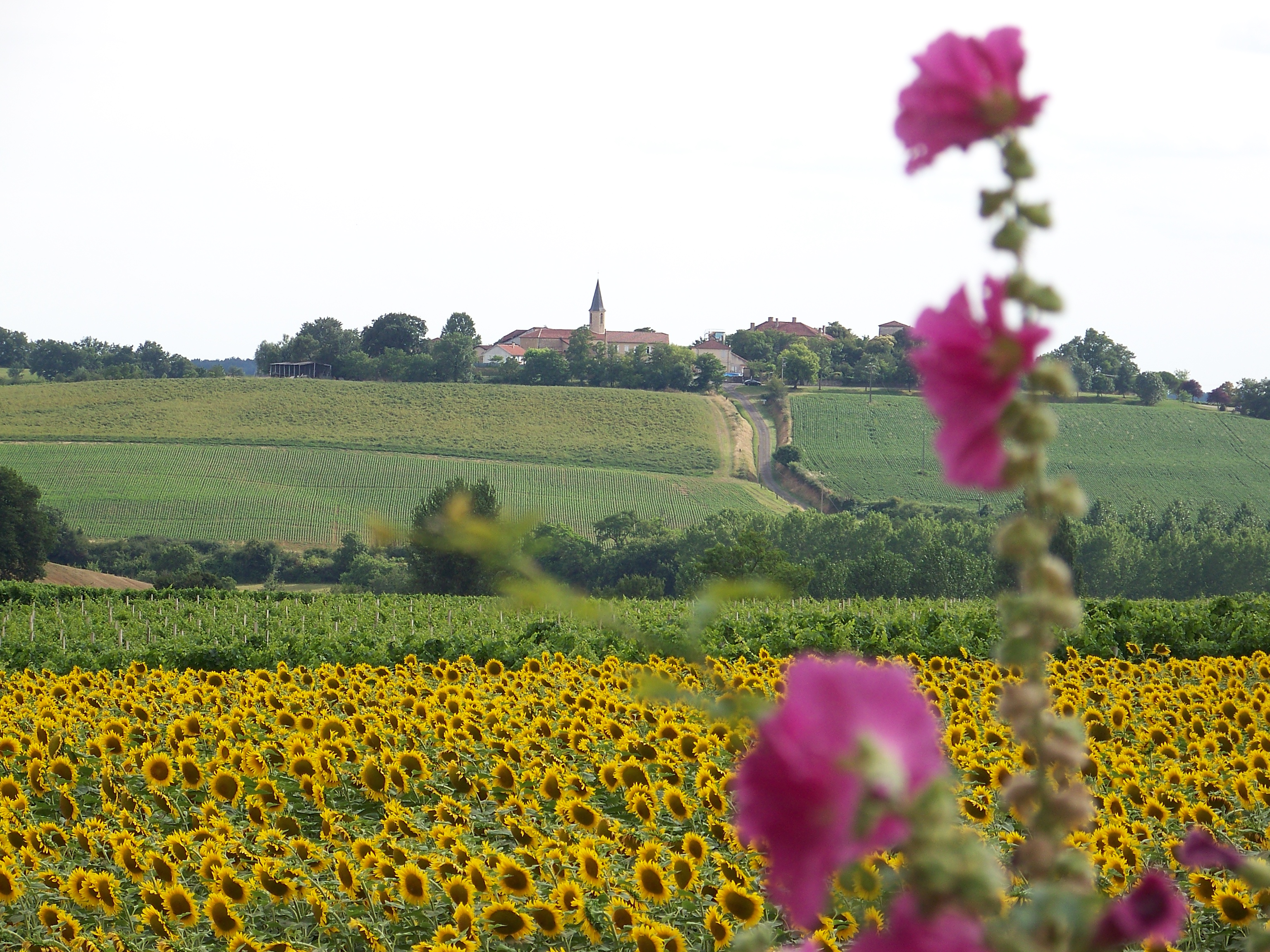
- A general view of Lagraulet-du-Gers
- Location of Lagraulet-du-Gers
- Location within France Location within Occitanie
- Coordinates: 43°54′16″N 0°12′48″E
- Country: France
- Region: Occitania
- Department: Gers
- Arrondissement: Condom
- Canton: Armagnac-Ténarèze

Government
  - Mayor (2020–2026): Nicolas Meliet
- Area^{1}: 27.22 km^{2} (10.51 sq mi)
- Highest elevation: 186 m (610 ft)
- Lowest elevation: 85 m (279 ft)
- Population (2023): 560
  - Density: 21/km^{2} (53/sq mi)
- Time zone: UTC+01:00 (CET)
  - Summer (DST): UTC+02:00 (CEST)
- INSEE/Postal code: 32180 /32330
- ^{1} French Land Register data, which excludes lakes, ponds, glaciers > 1 km^{2} (0.386 sq mi or 247 acres) and river estuaries.

Lagraulet-du-Gers (French pronunciation: [laɡʁolɛ dy ʒɛʁ(s)]; Occitan: L'Agraulet de Gers) is a commune in the Gers department in southwestern France.

== Geography ==
The Auzoue flows north through the middle of the commune.

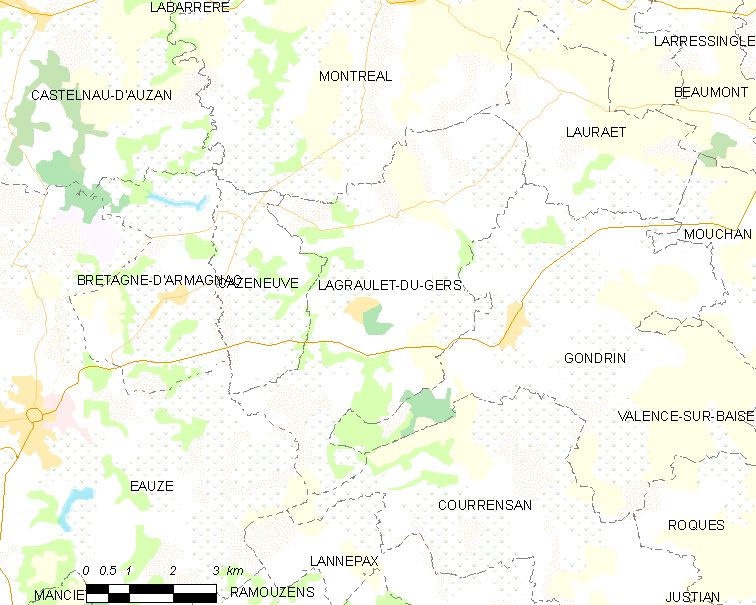
Lagraulet-du-Gers and its surrounding communes

== Population ==
Historical population
Year	Pop.	±% p.a.
1968	545	—
1975	410	−3.98%
1982	427	+0.58%
1990	395	−0.97%
1999	381	−0.40%
2007	370	−0.37%
2012	476	+5.17%
2017	575	+3.85%
2023	560	−0.44%
Source: INSEE

== See also ==
- Communes of the Gers department
