= Buros =

- Commune
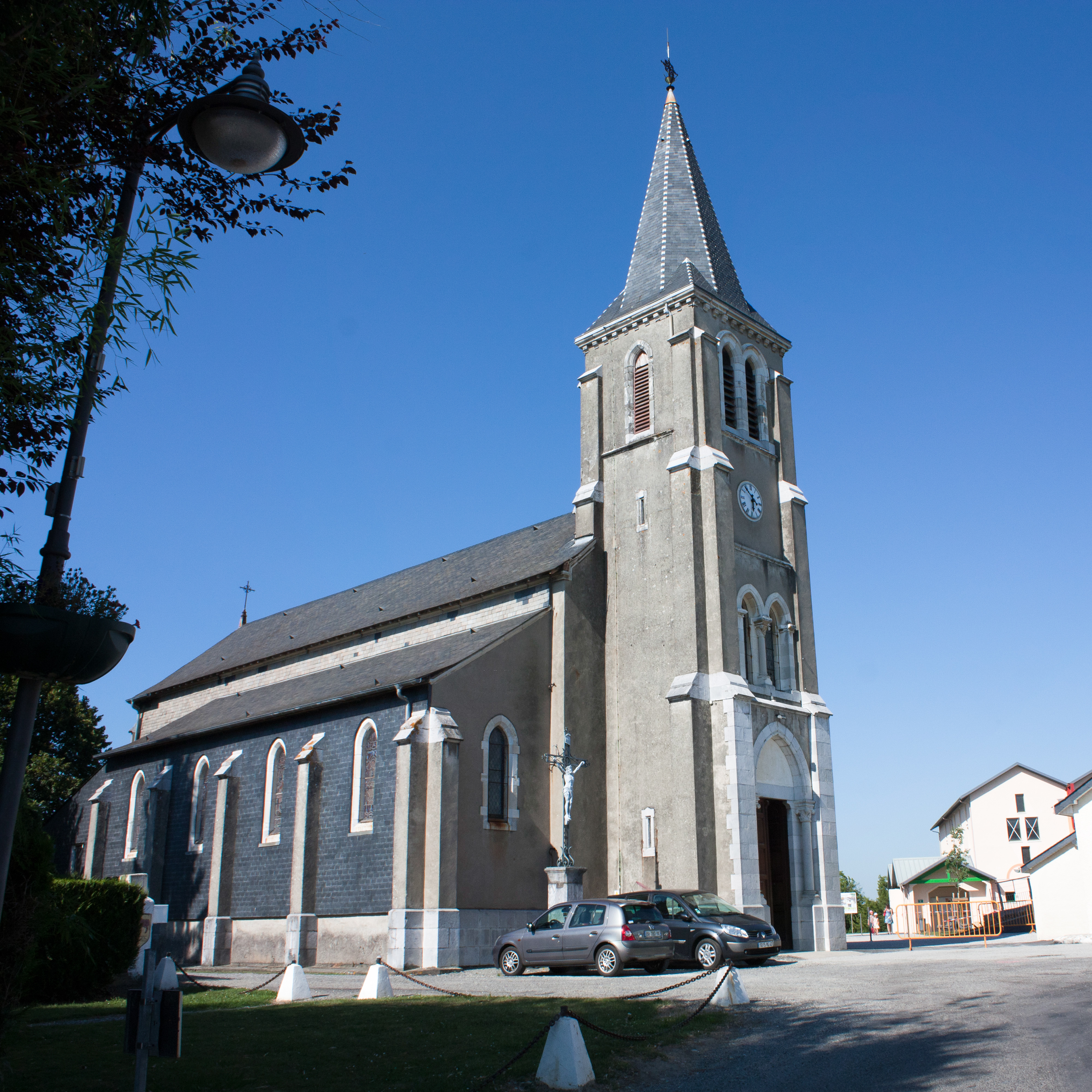
- The church of Saint Pierre, in Buros
- Location of Buros
- Location within France Location within Nouvelle-Aquitaine
- Coordinates: 43°21′12″N 0°18′30″W
- Country: France
- Region: Nouvelle-Aquitaine
- Department: Pyrénées-Atlantiques
- Arrondissement: Pau
- Canton: Pays de Morlaàs et du Montanérès

Government
  - Mayor (2020–2026): Thierry Carrere
- Area^{1}: 13.81 km^{2} (5.33 sq mi)
- Elevation: 283 m (928 ft)
- Highest elevation: 345 m (1,132 ft)
- Lowest elevation: 205 m (673 ft)
- Population (2023): 2,007
  - Density: 145.3/km^{2} (376.4/sq mi)
- Time zone: UTC+01:00 (CET)
  - Summer (DST): UTC+02:00 (CEST)
- INSEE/Postal code: 64152 /64160
- ^{1} French Land Register data, which excludes lakes, ponds, glaciers > 1 km^{2} (0.386 sq mi or 247 acres) and river estuaries.

Buros (French pronunciation: [byʁɔs]; Occitan: Buròs) is a commune in the Pyrénées-Atlantiques department in southwestern France.

== Population ==
Historical population
Year	Pop.	±% p.a.
1968	637	—
1975	691	+1.17%
1982	919	+4.16%
1990	1,155	+2.90%
1999	1,416	+2.29%
2007	1,734	+2.56%
2012	1,774	+0.46%
2017	1,883	+1.20%
2023	2,007	+1.07%
Source: INSEE

== See also ==
- Communes of the Pyrénées-Atlantiques department
- Buros Center for Testing
