= Gondrin =

- Commune
- Flag Coat of arms
- Location of Gondrin
- Location within France Location within Occitanie
- Coordinates: 43°53′10″N 0°14′16″E
- Country: France
- Region: Occitania
- Department: Gers
- Arrondissement: Condom
- Canton: Armagnac-Ténarèze

Government
  - Mayor (2025–2026): Hélène Tumelero
- Area^{1}: 34.76 km^{2} (13.42 sq mi)
- Elevation: 161 m (528 ft)
- Highest elevation: 181 m (594 ft)
- Lowest elevation: 80 m (260 ft)
- Population (2023): 1,175
  - Density: 33.80/km^{2} (87.55/sq mi)
- Time zone: UTC+01:00 (CET)
  - Summer (DST): UTC+02:00 (CEST)
- INSEE/Postal code: 32149 /32330
- ^{1} French Land Register data, which excludes lakes, ponds, glaciers > 1 km^{2} (0.386 sq mi or 247 acres) and river estuaries.

Gondrin (French pronunciation: [ɡɔ̃dʁɛ̃]) is a commune in the Gers department in southwestern France.

== Geography ==
The Auzoue flows north-northwest through the western part of the commune, then forms part of its western border.

The Osse flows north through the eastern part of the commune, then forms part of its northeastern border.

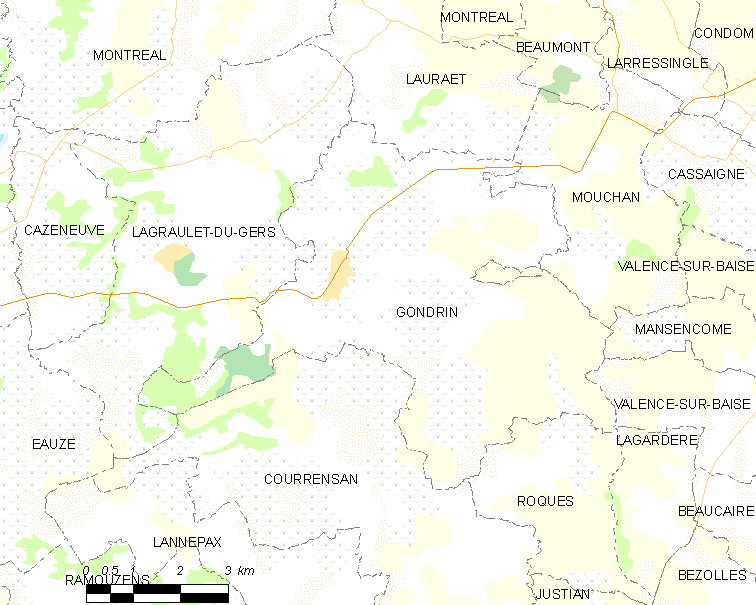
Gondrin and its surrounding communes

== Population ==
Historical population
Year	Pop.	±% p.a.
1968	1,162	—
1975	1,074	−1.12%
1982	1,041	−0.44%
1990	1,042	+0.01%
1999	999	−0.47%
2007	1,127	+1.52%
2012	1,126	−0.02%
2017	1,194	+1.18%
2023	1,175	−0.27%
Source: INSEE

== See also ==
- Communes of the Gers department
