= Bretagne-d'Armagnac =

- Commune
- Location of Bretagne-d'Armagnac
- Location within France Location within Occitanie
- Coordinates: 43°53′14″N 0°08′20″E
- Country: France
- Region: Occitania
- Department: Gers
- Arrondissement: Condom
- Canton: Armagnac-Ténarèze

Government
  - Mayor (2020–2026): Gérard Gourgues
- Area^{1}: 12.35 km^{2} (4.77 sq mi)
- Elevation: 124 m (407 ft)
- Highest elevation: 185 m (607 ft)
- Lowest elevation: 113 m (371 ft)
- Population (2023): 408
  - Density: 33.0/km^{2} (85.6/sq mi)
- Time zone: UTC+01:00 (CET)
  - Summer (DST): UTC+02:00 (CEST)
- INSEE/Postal code: 32064 /32800
- ^{1} French Land Register data, which excludes lakes, ponds, glaciers > 1 km^{2} (0.386 sq mi or 247 acres) and river estuaries.

Bretagne-d'Armagnac (French pronunciation: [bʁətaɲ daʁmaɲak], literally Bretagne of Armagnac; Occitan: Bretanha d'Armanhac) is a commune in the Gers department in southwestern France.

== Geography ==
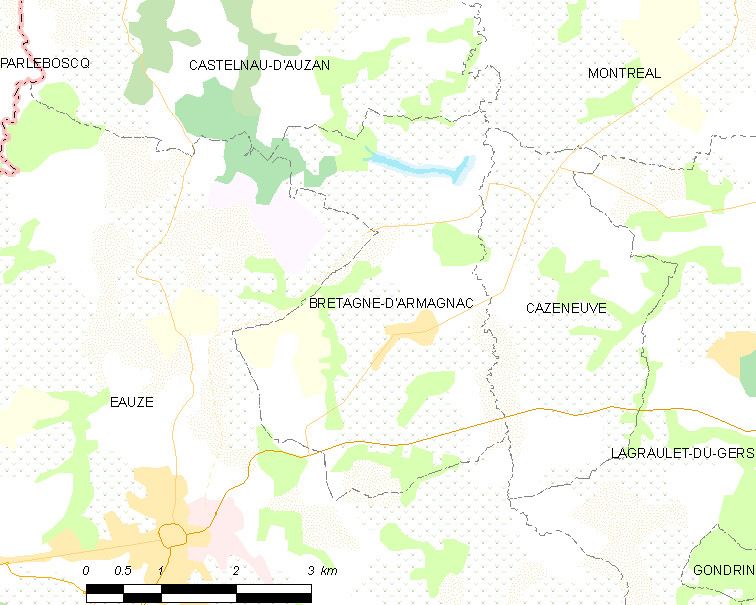
Bretagne-d'Armagnac and its surrounding communes

== Population ==
Historical population
Year	Pop.	±% p.a.
1968	388	—
1975	363	−0.95%
1982	392	+1.10%
1990	345	−1.58%
1999	345	+0.00%
2007	383	+1.31%
2012	427	+2.20%
2017	422	−0.24%
2023	408	−0.56%
Source: INSEE

== See also ==
- Communes of the Gers department
