= Cazaubon =

- Commune
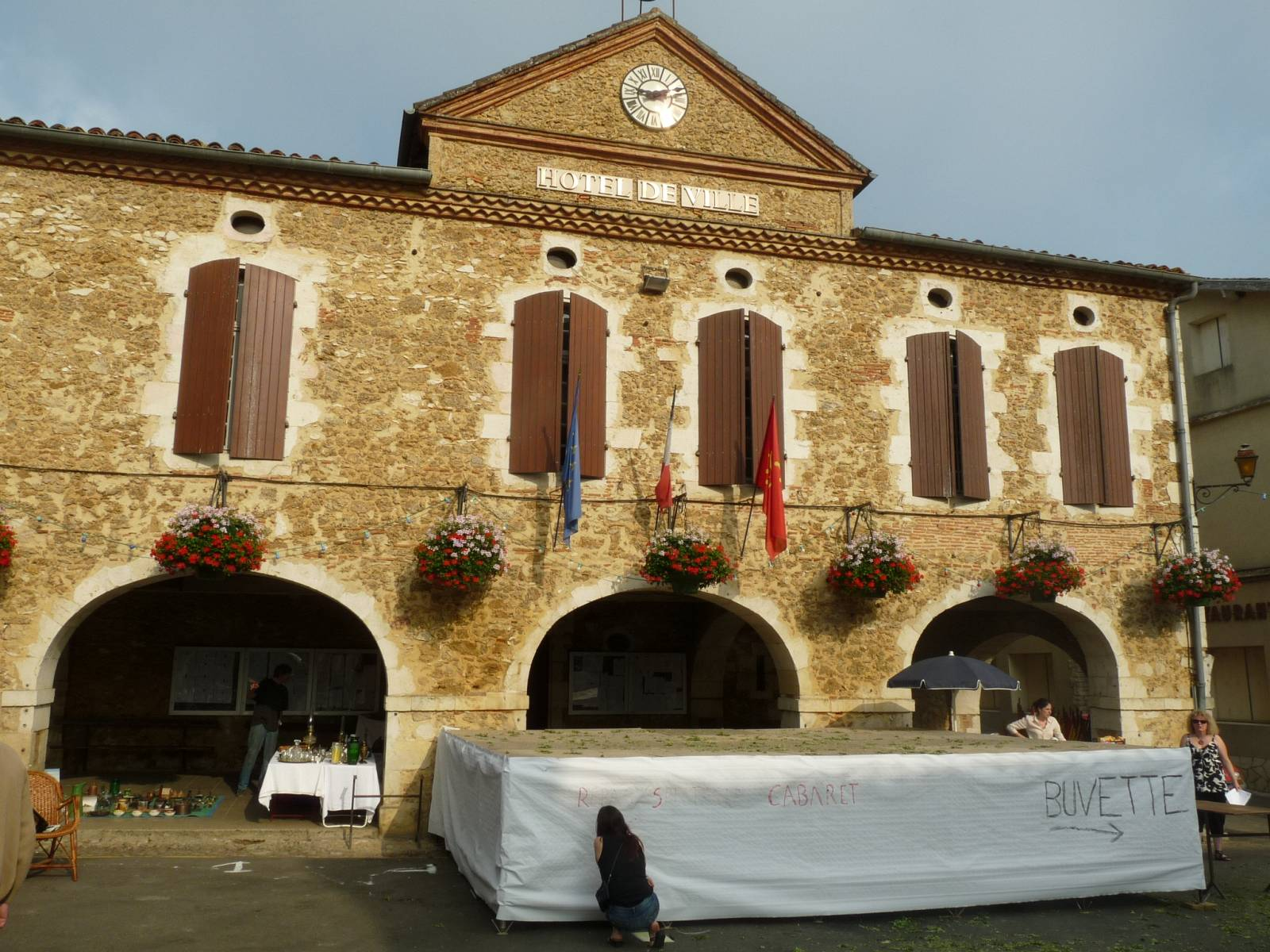
- The town hall in Cazaubon

- Coat of arms
- Location of Cazaubon
- Location within France Location within Occitanie
- Coordinates: 43°56′08″N 0°04′14″W
- Country: France
- Region: Occitania
- Department: Gers
- Arrondissement: Condom
- Canton: Grand-Bas-Armagnac
- Intercommunality: Grand-Armagnac

Government
  - Mayor (2020–2026): Isabelle Tintané
- Area^{1}: 55.64 km^{2} (21.48 sq mi)
- Elevation: 124 m (407 ft)
- Highest elevation: 183 m (600 ft)
- Lowest elevation: 92 m (302 ft)
- Population (2023): 1,665
  - Density: 29.92/km^{2} (77.50/sq mi)
- Time zone: UTC+01:00 (CET)
  - Summer (DST): UTC+02:00 (CEST)
- INSEE/Postal code: 32096 /32150
- ^{1} French Land Register data, which excludes lakes, ponds, glaciers > 1 km^{2} (0.386 sq mi or 247 acres) and river estuaries.

Cazaubon (French pronunciation: [kazobɔ̃]; Gascon: Casaubon) is a commune in the Gers department of southwestern France.

Besides the town of Cazaubon itself, the commune includes the adjacent spa town of Barbotan-les-Thermes.

== Geography ==
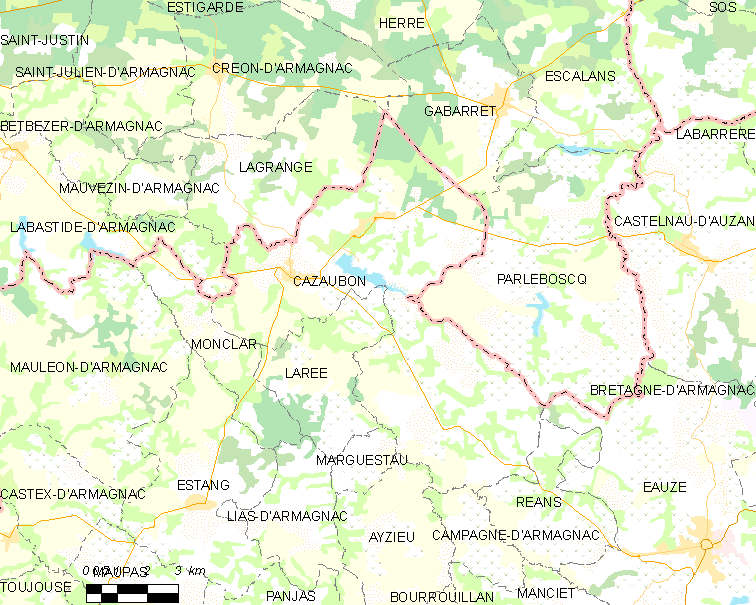
Cazaubon and its surrounding communes

== Population ==
Historical population
Year	Pop.	±% p.a.
1968	1,691	—
1975	1,638	−0.45%
1982	1,635	−0.03%
1990	1,605	−0.23%
1999	1,545	−0.42%
2007	1,622	+0.61%
2012	1,727	+1.26%
2017	1,629	−1.16%
2023	1,665	+0.36%
Source: INSEE

== See also ==
- Communes of the Gers department
