= Larressingle =

- Commune
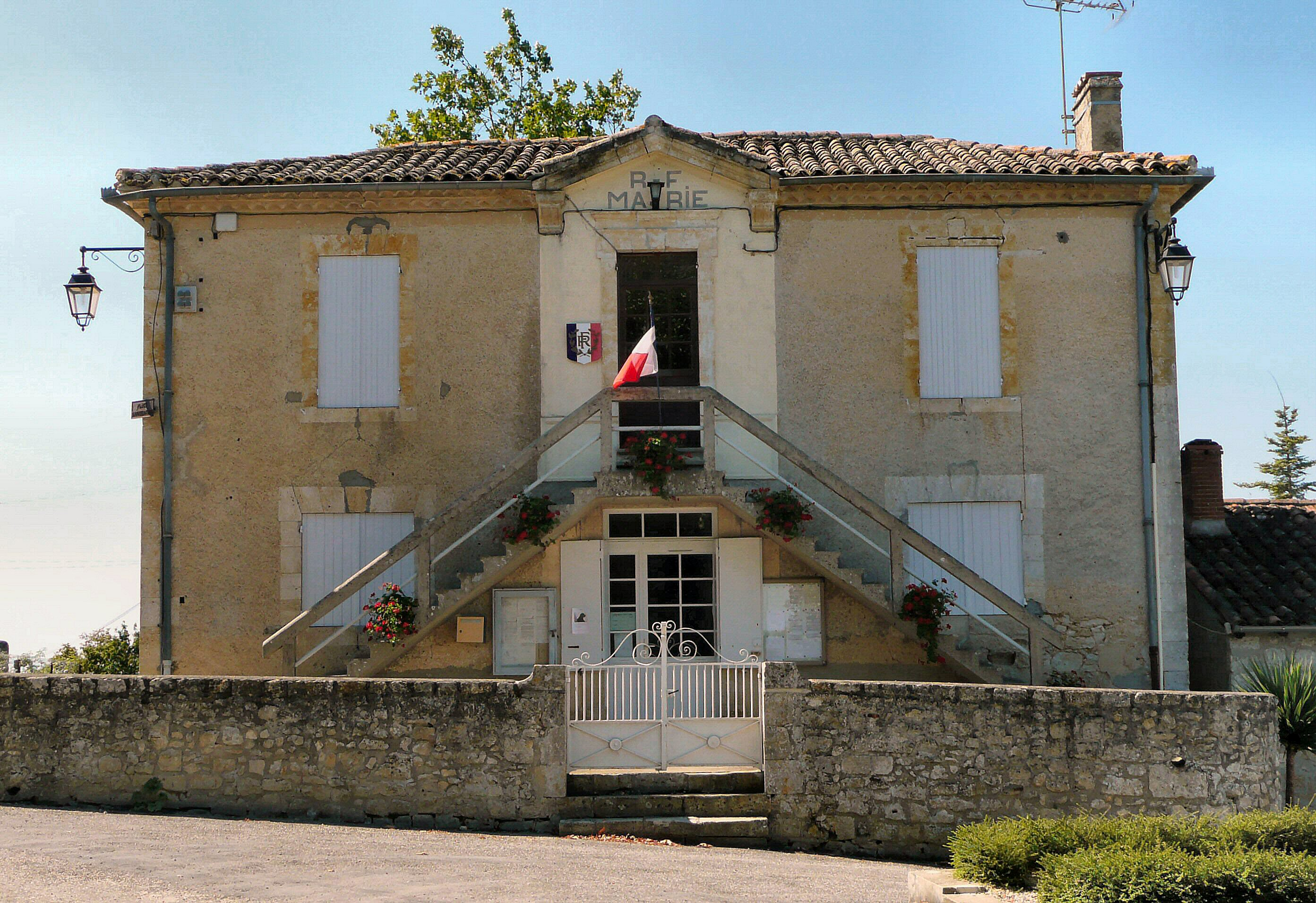
- Town hall

- Coat of arms
- Location of Larressingle
- Location within France Location within Occitanie
- Coordinates: 43°56′45″N 0°18′40″E
- Country: France
- Region: Occitania
- Department: Gers
- Arrondissement: Condom
- Canton: Armagnac-Ténarèze
- Intercommunality: Ténarèze

Government
  - Mayor (2020–2026): Xavier Fernandez
- Area^{1}: 8.55 km^{2} (3.30 sq mi)
- Highest elevation: 177 m (581 ft)
- Lowest elevation: 75 m (246 ft)
- Population (2023): 213
  - Density: 24.9/km^{2} (64.5/sq mi)
- Demonym: Larressinglois
- Time zone: UTC+01:00 (CET)
  - Summer (DST): UTC+02:00 (CEST)
- INSEE/Postal code: 32194 /32100
- ^{1} French Land Register data, which excludes lakes, ponds, glaciers > 1 km^{2} (0.386 sq mi or 247 acres) and river estuaries.

Larressingle (French pronunciation: [laʁəsɛ̃ɡl]; Occitan: Larressingla) is a commune in the Gers department in southwestern France. It is a member of Les Plus Beaux Villages de France (The Most Beautiful Villages of France) Association.

== Geography ==
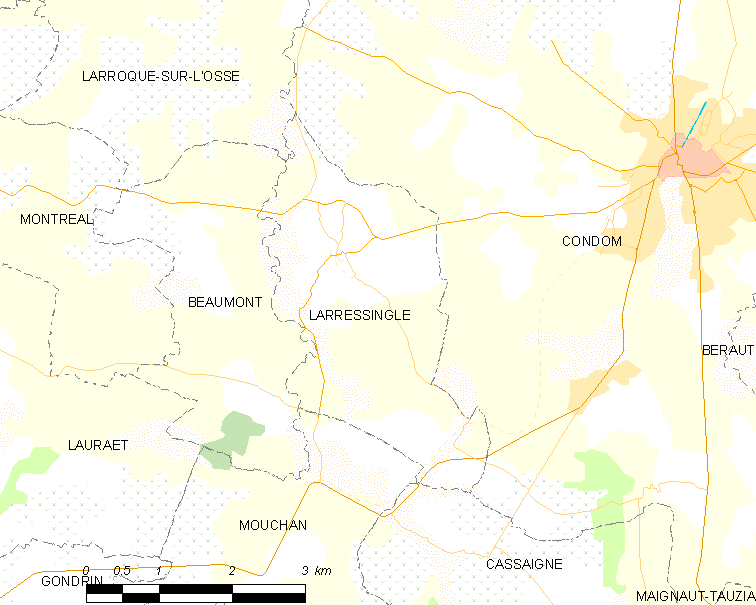
Larressingle and its surrounding communes

== Population ==
Historical population
Year	Pop.	±% p.a.
1968	170	—
1975	155	−1.31%
1982	138	−1.65%
1990	161	+1.95%
1999	200	+2.44%
2007	202	+0.12%
2012	210	+0.78%
2017	214	+0.38%
2023	213	−0.08%
Source: INSEE

== Sights ==
- Château de Larressingle (c. 1250 – c. 1550), ruins
- Walls
- Port of Artigue
- Castle
- Church of St. Sigismund
- Siege machines

== Notable people ==
- André Adam (1936–2016), diplomat

== See also ==
- Communes of the Gers department
