= Saint Fris =

8th-century Catholic saint

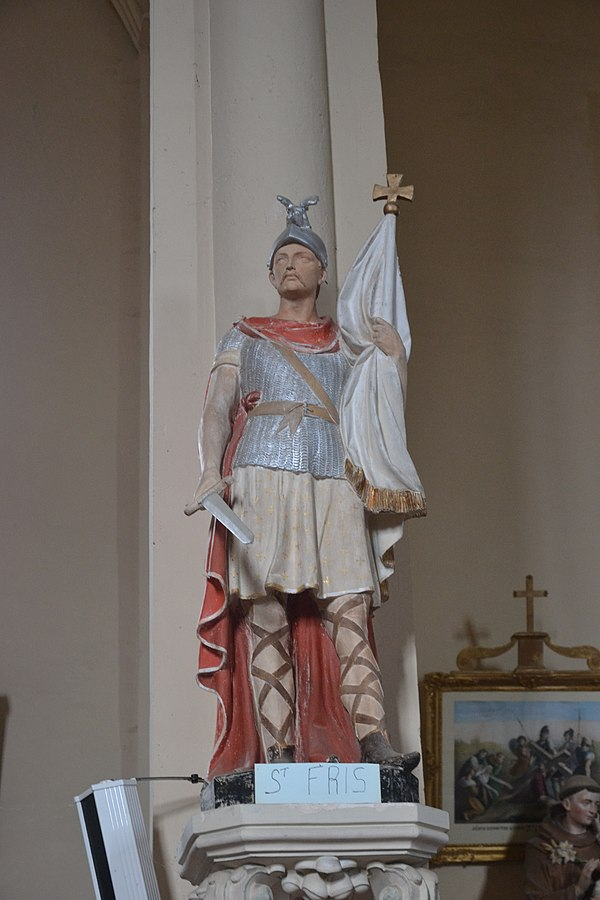
Saint Fris statute in the church of Lupiac

Saint Fris, also known as Fris de Bassoues, Latin Frisius or Frisus, also Frix, or Fritz, is a warrior saint venerated in the region Aquitaine, département Gers, in France. Saint Fris was considered the defender of Aquitaine against the Saracens. The legend regards him as a knight of Frisian descent, allegedly a son of King Radbod of Frisia. His shrine is located in the Basilica Saint-Fris de Bassoues.

The name of Saint Fris has been known since the 11th century. His popularity peaked in the 16th century and experienced a revival after the mid-19th century. Since 2001 Saint Fris is the patron saint of the newly established parish of Saint-Fris-d'Anglès (Bassoues, Montesquiou). His present cult is largely restricted to four parishes in the region of Astarac.

The medieval legend of Saint Fris is not supported by historical sources. It may well have been inspired by troubadour songs and chansons de geste about legendary Frisian kings rather than having been derived from religious hagiography. The basilica of Saint-Fris is situated on the Via Tolosana, one of the 12th-century pilgrims' ways to Santiago di Compostela, which may have contributed to the popularity of the Saint's cult.

Hagiographers of the 17th century subsequently placed the legend in a historical context. The saint is discussed in the compendium Acta Sanctorum on June 24 (Antwerp 1695), but is absent from most other reference works. The ecclesiastical compendium Bibliotheca Sanctorum concluded in 1964 that, due to the lack of sources, doubts remain about the sainthood of Saint Fris.

== Legend ==
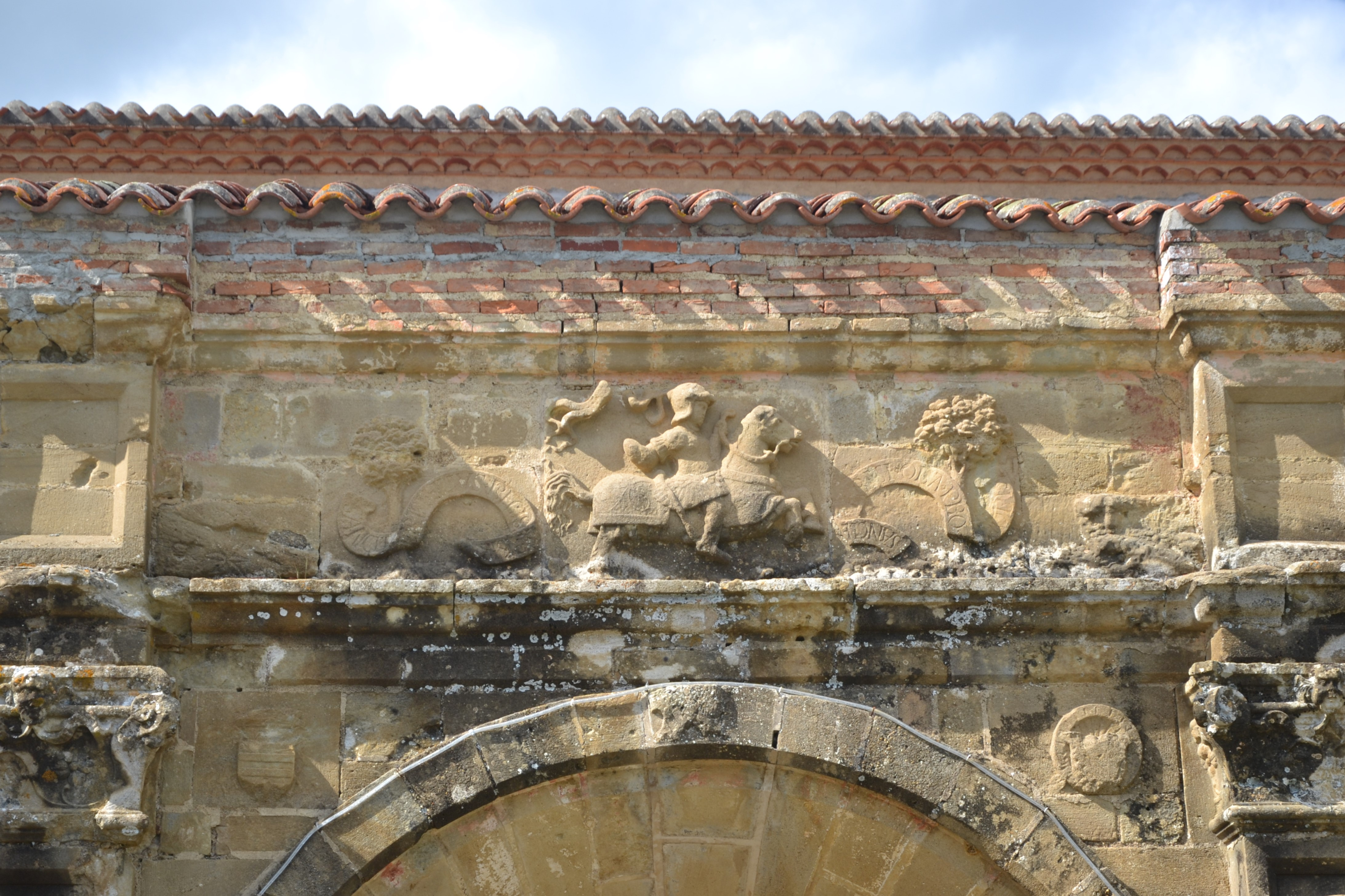
Renaissance bas-relief above the portal of the Basilica Saint-Fris de Bassoues, showing Saint Fris as a knight on horse back and identifying him as a prince from Frisia. 1520.

The character of Fris is surrounded by legends, of which it is difficult to determine whether they are based on actual events or on literary imagination. According to the ecclesiastical tradition Fris, probably meaning 'the Frisian', was a commander of a Frankish army during the rule of the Mayor of the Palace Charles Martel. He was killed in battle in the year AD 732.

Following to the same legend, Fris was the son of the King of Frisia. An inscription on an early 16-century portal depicts the saint as a knight on a horse, accompanied by the text: Sanctus Frisius, filius regis Frisiae – Sancte Frisi, ora pro nobis ("Saint Fris, son of the King of Frisia – Saint Fris, pray for us"). As a sign of his royal descent, his helmet is depicted with a crown, whereas he holds a scepter in his hand. It is assumed, moreover, that Fris was not a baptismal name, but a reference to the saint's origins. The history of Saint Fris is largely based on a report by archbishop Léonard de Trappes in 1623, on a manuscript lost in the early 17th century as well as on local traditions.

Jesuit scholars from the 17th-century Bollandist Society, who corresponded 1691 with the canons of Bassoues, inferred that Fris might be a son of King Radbod, and a nephew of the Frankish statesman Charles Martel. The canons, who preserved some memories of the manuscript, later communicated their knowledge to the archbishop's vicar general, the abbot d'Aignan du Sendat (1681–1764). According to d'Aignan du Sendat it was in his time "a generally accepted belief" that Fris was the son of Radbod.

According to the Life of Wulfram of Sens (Vita Vulframni), written around 800, King Radbod indeed had a son that was baptized and named after his father, but he died after a few days, still wearing his white baptismal garment. The Annals of Metz, also dated around 800, claim that Grimoald (the son of the Mayor of the Palace Pippin of Herstal) had a son by his concubine, who was named Theudoald. The theud- or thiad- component of his name, however, may imply he actually was the son of Radbod's daughter named Theudesinda or Thiadsvind. The marriage between Grimoald and Theudesinda AD 711 is historical. All things considered, the true identity of the saint remains matter of speculation.

== Battle of l'Étendard ==
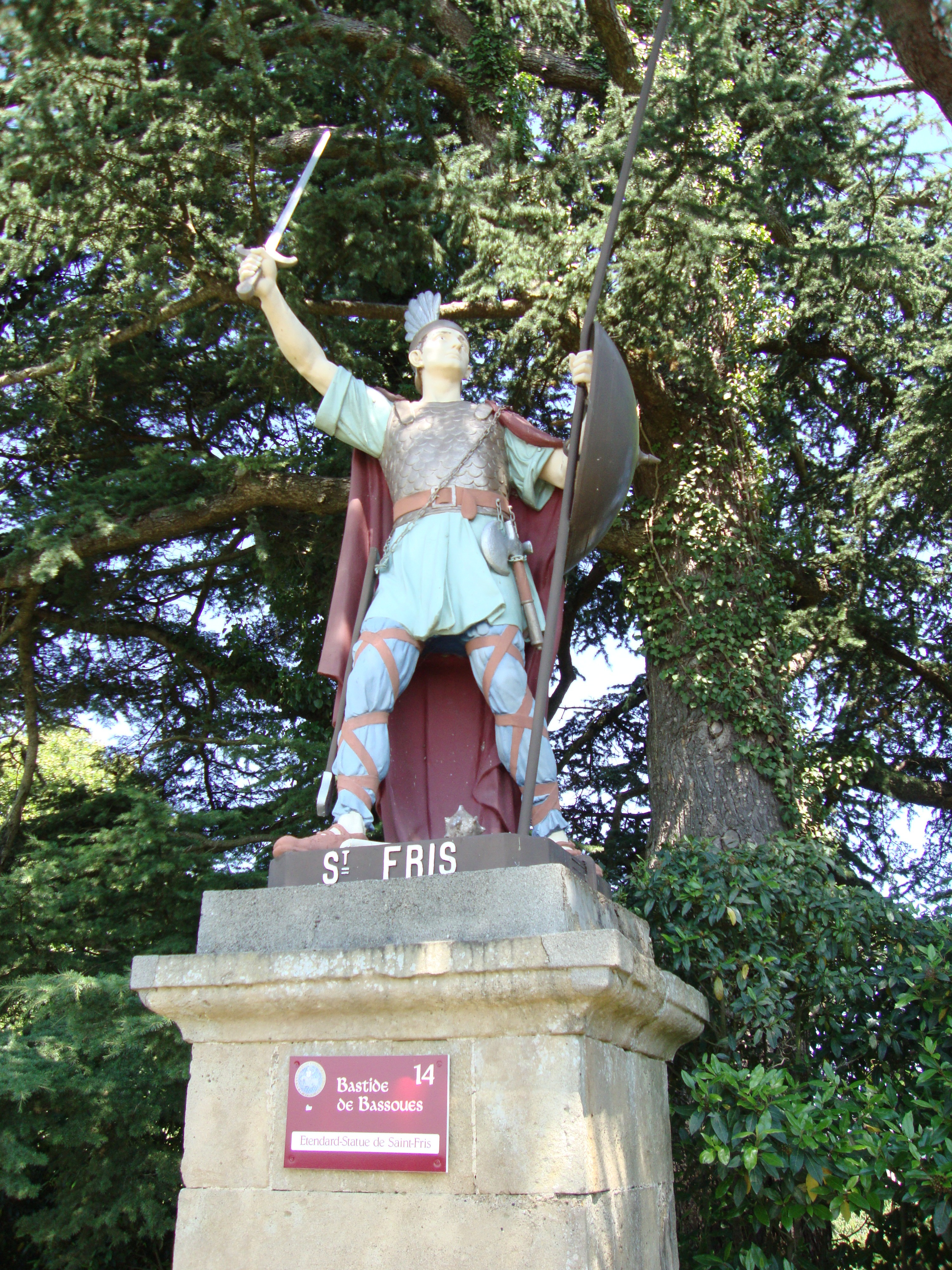
Statue of Saint Fris in L'Étendard near Bassoues, where the battle of 732 is said to have taken place.

In the year AD 732, the Umayyad Caliphate advanced into the region Aquitaine. This led to the great Battle of Tours in October that year, in which Charles Martel earned his nickname martelles ("the hammer"). According to the legend, Charles at first endorsed Fris to push forward in order to challenge the Umayyad forces led by Abd al-Rahman al-Ghafiqi. It came to a confrontation in June 732. The first battle took place near Lupiac and was undecided. But Fris regrouped his forces on a hill near La Tapia (present-day Bassoues), at the Ténarèze, the main transhumance route from Bordeaux into the Pyrenees, where it crosses the 12th-century pilgrims' road to Santiago de Compostela. On this plateau, on June 24, he planted his standard and confronted the Umayyads a second time. This is the reason why the battle is called the Battle of l'Étendard ('standard' or 'banner'), which is said to have taken place near the Moulin de l'Étendard (west of Bassoues). The latter battle was won by the Franks, but at the loss of Fris's life. He was hit by an arrow in his thigh, and was carried from the battlefield by his horse. He died at the banks of the rivulet Guiroue and was buried on the spot (near the Pont du Chrétien). Statues of Fris often show him as a standard bearer. In the Frisian tradition, their legendary leader Saint Magnus or Magnus Forteman, whose remnants were said to have been rescued from the Saracenes, is often depicted as a standard bearer as well.

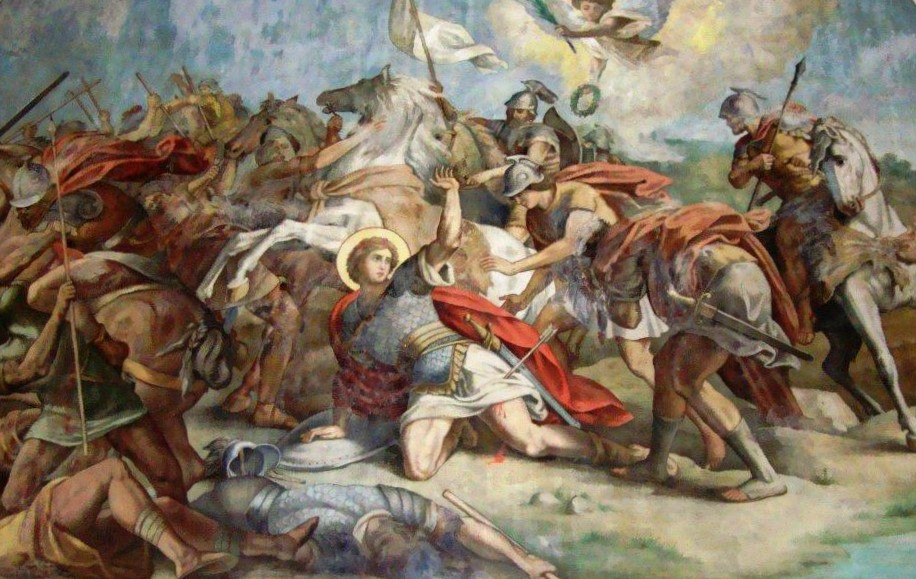
Fresco in the Mary's Nativity Church of Bassoues Paul-Noël Lasseran (1868-1833), showing the death of Saint Fris after his victory against the Saracens in the Battle of l'Étendard, AD 732.

The idea that Frisians were fighting in the Frankish armies against the Saracens is not far-fetched. Frisian as well as Saxon contingents were deployed against the Danes, Slavs and Avars, which brought them as far as the River Danube in modern Hungary.

Another interesting aspect is that Fris is depicted as riding a horse. Allegedly, Fris was part a cavalry unit, possibly a small vanguard suited to observe the movements of the Umayyad army and to design an effective strategy. During the Late Middle Ages, Frisians were well-known horse breeders, exporting their horses all over Europe. Frisian horses are often mentioned in the chansons de geste. In the epos La Chevalerie Ogier de Danemarche, none other than the illustrious Charlemagne rides a ceval Frise ('Frisian horse'). What is more, Friesian horses were renown as chargeurs (‘war horses’) throughout the Middle Ages, and centuries after. Knights on horseback, moreover, were part of the traditional iconography of the High Middle Ages.

However, it may well be that the stories involved originated much later, in the wake of the Crusades, when King Radbod ("Raimbaud") and his fictitious successor Gondebeuf (who was supposed to have been buried in Belin-Béliet (Gironde)) featured in chivalric romances such as the Chanson de Roland and the fictiuous Historia Caroli Magni. In these stories contemporary Crucade and Camino propaganda was projected back into the time of the Carolingians. The character of the soldier-saint (le soldat guerrier) was quite popular during this period and frequently appeared in troubadour songs.

== Cult of Saint Fris ==
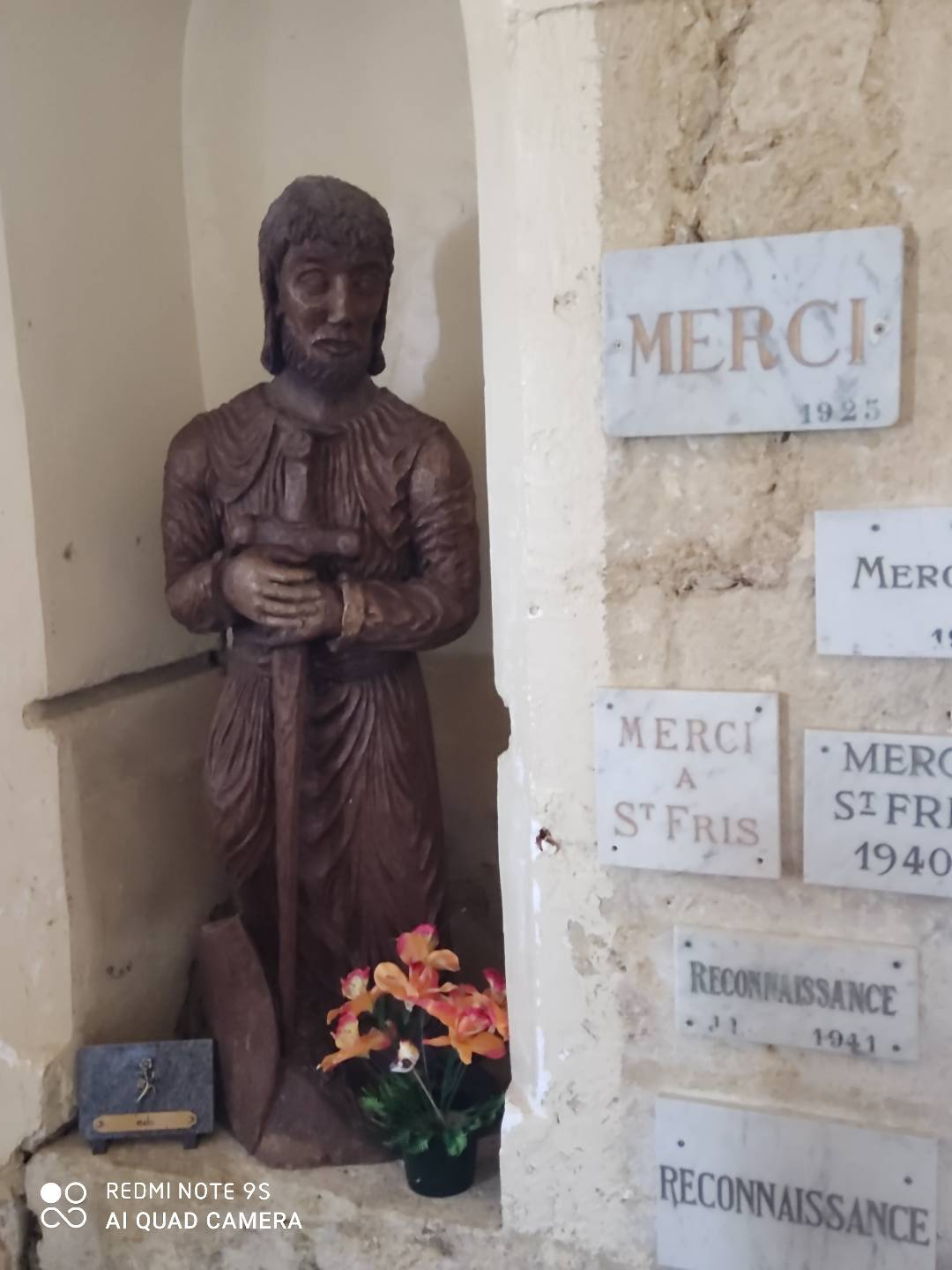
Wooden statue of Saint-Fris in the basilica of Bassoues; 19th-century copy of a lost original.

According to legendary tradition, the sarcophagus of Saint Fris was discovered some two centuries after his death by peasants from a nearby farm witnessing strange behavior of one of their cows. The cow refused food and preferred to lick a large stone hidden in the bushes. In spite of this she was healthier and fatter than the rest of the herd. After moving the stone, the herdsman unearthed a sarcophagus containing the saint's preserved body with armor and weaponry. Shortly thereafter, the villagers furnished a chapel behind the altar of their parish church, dedicated to Saint Fris. When they planned to transfer the shrine, they discovered that all draft oxen refused to pull the loaded wagon, except for the cow that had been licking the stone, which completed the heavy task without any difficulty.

From this time onward all kinds of miracles took place. The village of Bassoues became a place of pilgrimage. As is often said to happen during the transfer of relics (translatio) a fresh water well sprang up from the place where the body of Saint Fris had been buried. In the nearby hamlet of Andréou the dough that irreverently had been moistened with water from the well turned to blood. A leper house or crestias, mentioned in 1283 and 1295, was probably located near the fountain. The parish church of Bassoues also has a 15th-century font for the lepers or untouchables. A 17th-century report states that villagers carried beneficial water from the well to patients who were confined to their houses. In 1890, at the initiative of the local priest Father A. Blajan, the original fountain on the hill was replaced by a chapel, accompanied by a small bathhouse for pilgrims.

His veneration is associated with curing epilepsy and other chronic diseases. In the Middle Ages he may have been the patron of lepers and other intouchables. His skull played a role in major ceremonies such as the consecration of the Auch Cathedral 1121. The rest of his body was kept in a plain sandstone sarcophagus in the Basilica of Saint Fris de Bassoues.

His cult was at its height in the 16th century and remained popular until the end of the Ancien Régime. His major feast was on 16 January, the day that his body was recovered, supplemented by other festivities on 25 June (his day of death) and 29 August (Beheading of John the Baptist), as well as a pilgrimage on Trinity Sunday. According to the 1521 town privileges, these were accompanied by a market fair. Additionally, there was a procession on the second Sunday of May. The parishes of Bassoues, Béraut, Gazax-et-Baccarisse, Gondrin, Lannemaignan, Laujuzan, Lupiac, Peyrusse-Vieille, Préneron, Saint-Go and Betbèze (Hautes-Pyrénées), had either altars dedicated to Saint Fris, or venerated him as their patron saint. The funeral chapel of Mas-Vieux de Vic-Fezensac, where the saint was venerated highly, kept his arm. Other chapels were to be found in Aubiet, Eauze and Mont-d’Astarac. At least 30 churches received his relics. Hundreds of boys (Fris. Friz, Frix) and girls (Frise, Frize, Frison, Frisette) were named after him. The churches of Bassoues, Gazax-et-Baccarisse, Lupiac and Peyrusse-Vieille still have the saint's statues.

Miraculous healings occurred after a prayer or vow at the saint's tomb. When the powerful archbishop Henri de La Mothe-Houdancourt wanted to open the shrine in 1670, a flame is said to have come out, which frightened his helpers and made them abandon the plan. The archbishop made Saint Fris co-patron of the episcopal chapel of Château de Mazères. Further miracles concerned the healing of a noblewoman's daughter and of a boy, whose arm was due to be amputated.

The veneration of Saint Fris revived since the 1850s, when the basilica Saint-Fris de Bassoues was rebuilt. Since the 1880s the church is named Basilique Saint-Fris. The nearby lake is called Lac de Saint-Fris. Supplementary chapels have been founded in the 1890s on the locations where he is said to have fought his last fight and where he died. The cult of Saint Fris has recently attracted the attention of right-wing politicians, who hail the warrior-saint as a champion against the alleged islamization of France.

== Basilica Saint-Fris de Bassoues ==
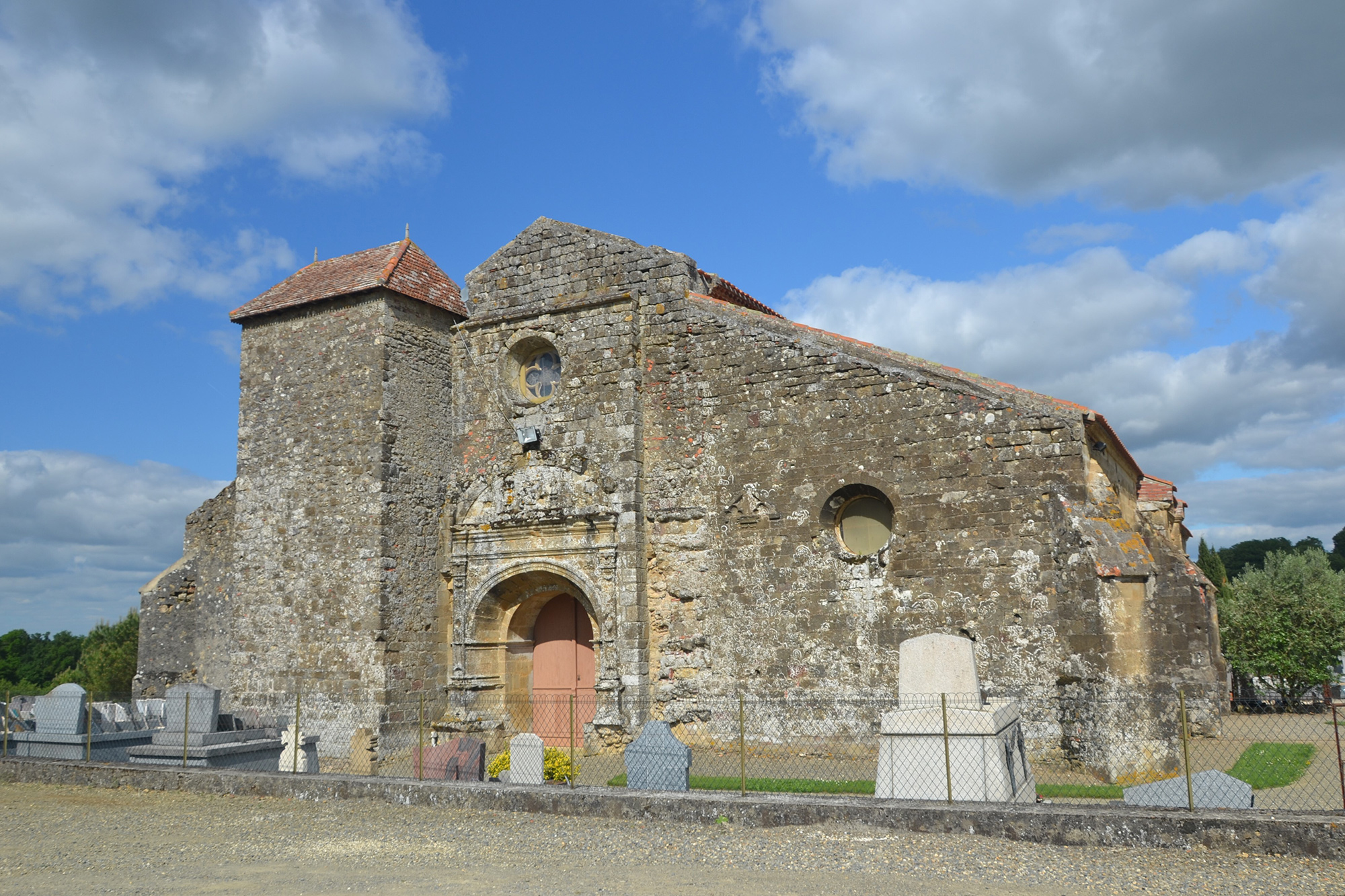
Basilica Saint-Fris de Bassoues

The church of Saint Fris is first mentioned in November 1020. A charter from the Benedictine monastery of Saint Michel in Pessan testifies that the castle of Bassoues and the church of the blessed Frisian (ecclesia beati Frisii) are donated to the monastery by its owner, the nobleman Raymond de Bassoues, in order to establish a new monastery of the said order. The donation was renewed in 1047, after which the monastery may have been built next to the church. Apparently (though it is not clair when this took place), the church was subsequently enlarged into a three-aisled basilica. However, Hundred Years' War, the Wars of Religion, and last but not least, the French Revolution, did much harm to the buildings.

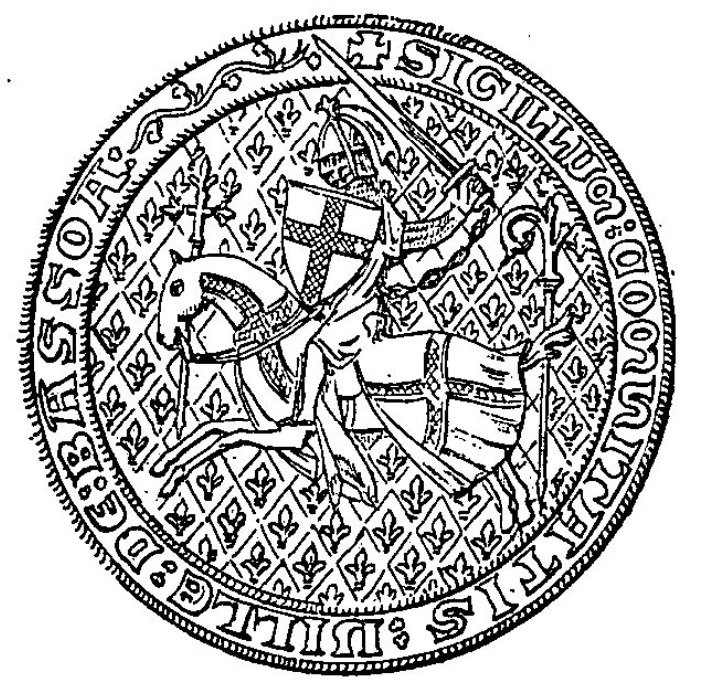
Seal of the town of Bassoues, about 1400, with the edge inscription Sigillvm commvnitatis uille de Bassoa.

In 1270 the territory of Bassoues came under the rule of the archbishop of Auch. The village (called La Tapia) was rearranged to a bastide, which left the basilica unprotected. The village was provided with town privileges, dating 1295 and 1325. Archbishop Arnaud Aubert (1356–1371) fortified the bastide and ordered the construction of new church – La Nativité-Notre-Dame de Bassoues – as well as an impressive donjon within the walls. The bell tower dates from 1453. The monastery fell into decline in the 15th century. The town's seal from about 1400 depicts Saint Fris as a knight sitting on horseback.

The Saint Mary's Nativity Church was made the parish church in 1510, and transformed into collegiate church (with 12 canons) in 1512. The former monastery was probably incorporated into the college. Still, in 1520 the basilica (now degraded to a chapel) with the crypt of Saint Fris was renovated and provided with Renaissance decorated portals, by order of the influential cardinal Clermont-Lodève. Again, Saint Fris is shown on horseback. In 1569, during the Wars of Religion, the buildings were set in fire by the troops of Montgomery. The ruins were restored in 1623. Only the crypt remained miraculously untouched. The saint's skull was transferred to Peyrusse-Grande, in order to prevent the Huguenots from destroying it. Further destruction took place in 1793, when the saint's shrine was broken open, its contents scattered and partly rescued by the villagers. The town council ordered the demolition of the basilica. The statues were burned, only part of Saint Fris's head was saved. The tomb was used as a drinking trough for cattle of a neighboring farm, but one of the oxen that drank here is said to have died. From 1847 to 1855, the basilica was restored to its former grandeur, the remaining relics were recollected, and the skull was returned in 1857. The basilica was reconsecrated in 1888. It was enlisted as a Historical Monument in 1944 and renovated in 1957; the whole site was enlisted in 2016.

19th century antiquarians created the story that the village was previously a place of worship for the druids and the site of a pagan temple dedicated to the Roman war god Mars, as the name of the forest of Le Marsoulès is supposed to bear witness to. The mythologist Denise Homerin-Barberon recently speculated that Saint Fris might be the successor of an ancient sun cult. The discovery of his tomb by a cow supposedly represents the female element of the moon, absorbed by Christianity as the Virgin Mary.

== Modern use ==
- The veterans' organization Fédération "Le Combattant du Gers", founded in 1923, has Saint Fris as its patron saint. The organization is part of the Fédération nationale André Maginot.
- The Association Saint-Fris du Gers, founded 1991, aims to maintain and promote the Latin Mass in Tridentine form.
- Since January 2017, pilgrimages to the basilica of Saint-Fris de Bassoues have been held, focusing in particular on the problems of farmers in the region of Astarac.

== Literature ==
- Jacques Baudoin, Grand livre des saints: culte et iconographie en Occident. Nonette: Editions Creer, 2006, p. 229. ISBN 978-2-84819-041-9.(French)
- Jean-Marie Bénac, Les Saints du calendre diocésain d’Auch, Auch 1916–1923, vol. 1, pp. 67–102 (French)
- Jean Guilhempey, Histoire de Bassoues et de la chapelle de Saint-Fritz, Auch 1856 (French)
- Jean Guilhempey, 'XVI^{e} jour du Janvier: Saint Fritz, martyr à Bassoues, VIII^{e} siècle' [extract], in: Paul Guérin, Les petits bollandistes, vies des saints de l'Ancien et du Nouveau Testament, des martyrs, des pères, des auteurs sacrés et ecclésiastiques des vénérables et autres personnes mortes en odeur de sainteté, 7th ed., vol. 1, Bar-le-Duc and Paris 1876, pp. 639–643 (French)
- Denise Homerin, 'À l’aube de l’Europe, un saint friso-gascon: la légende dorée de saint Fris de Bassoues', in: Mythologie Française. Bulletin de la Société de mythologie française, no. 194 (1998), p. 23-30 (part 1); no.195 (1999), p. 17-28 (part 2); no. 196 (1999), pp. 13–21 (part 3) (French)
- Jeff van Hout, 'De zoon van Radbod op avontuur in Zuid-Frankrijk', in: SEMafoor 17 (2016), nr. 3, pp. 2–7 (online on Nifterlaca.nl) (Dutch)
