= Izaute =

- Location within France Location within Occitanie

Location
- Country: France

Physical characteristics
- Source
  - location: Dému, France
- Mouth
  - location: Joins Gélise on the border of Lot-et-Garonne
  - coordinates: 43°59′47″N 0°7′33″E
- Length: 37.5 km (23.3 mi)

Basin features
- Progression: Gélise→ Baïse→ Garonne→ Gironde estuary→ Atlantic Ocean

The Izaute is a river in south-western France, a right tributary of the Gélise. It is 37.5 km (23.3 mi) long.

== Geography ==
It has its origin in the commune Dému in the Gers (32) it joins the Gélise on the border of Lot-et-Garonne close to Saint-Pé-Saint-Simon .

== Departments and principal cities ==
- Gers: Lannepax, Bretagne-d'Armagnac, Cazeneuve, Labarrère
