= Castillon =

Castillon may refer to several communes in France:

- Castillon, Alpes-Maritimes, in the Alpes-Maritimes département
- Castillon, Calvados, in the Calvados département
- Castillon (Canton of Arthez-de-Béarn), in the Pyrénées-Atlantiques département, in the canton of Arthez-de-Béarn
- Castillon (Canton of Lembeye), in the Pyrénées-Atlantiques département in the canton de Lembeye
- Castillon, Hautes-Pyrénées, in the Hautes-Pyrénées département
- Castillon-Debats, in the Gers département
- Castillon-de-Castets, in the Gironde département
- Castillon-de-Larboust, in the Haute-Garonne département
- Castillon-de-Saint-Martory, in the Haute-Garonne département
- Castillon-du-Gard, in the Gard département
- Castillon-en-Auge, in the Calvados département
- Castillon-en-Couserans, in the Ariège département
- Castillon-la-Bataille, in the Gironde département
  - Battle of Castillon, that ended the Hundred Year's War
- Castillon-Massas, in the Gers département
- Castillon-Savès, in the Gers département

Also

- Lac de Castillon is a reservoir in Alpes-de-Haute-Provence, France

People:

- Adèle Castillon, French singer and actress
- Alexis de Castillon, French composer
