= Gélise =

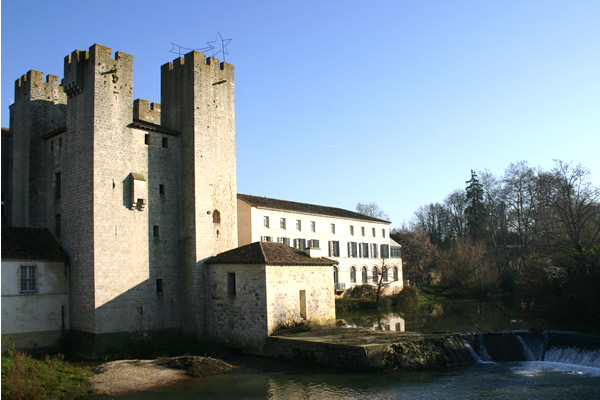

- Location within France Location within Nouvelle-Aquitaine

Location
- Country: France

Physical characteristics
- Mouth
  - location: Baïse
  - coordinates: 44°10′45″N 0°17′18″E
- Length: 92 km (57 mi)

Basin features
- Progression: Baïse→ Garonne→ Gironde estuary→ Atlantic Ocean

The Gélise (pronounced [ʒeliːz]; Occitan: Gelie) is a tributary of the river Baïse in Gascony, southwestern France. It is 92.0 km (57.2 mi) long.

== Etymology ==
The name Gélise comes from the Aquitanian hydronymic root Jel, meaning "watercourse."

== Geography ==
The Gélise originates in the Gers département at Cahuzères, north of Lupiac, then it flows northwest in the direction of Eauze. It drains the land around Castelnau-d'Auzan, then it flows northeast where it forms the natural boundary between the forest of the Landes of Gascony, the slopes of the Armagnac-Ténarèze.

It unites with the Baïse just after passing the fortified mill of Lavardac in Lot-et-Garonne.

The Osse, a right tributary, joins the Gélise near Nérac. The Auzoue, a right tributary, joins the Gélise at Mézin. The Izaute, a right tributary, joins the Gélise at Saint-Pé-Saint-Simon.

== Départements and principal cities ==
The Gélise passes through the following départements and cities:

- Gers: Dému, Eauze
- Lot-et-Garonne: Sos, Poudenas, Mézin, Barbaste
