= Cazaux-d'Anglès =

- Commune
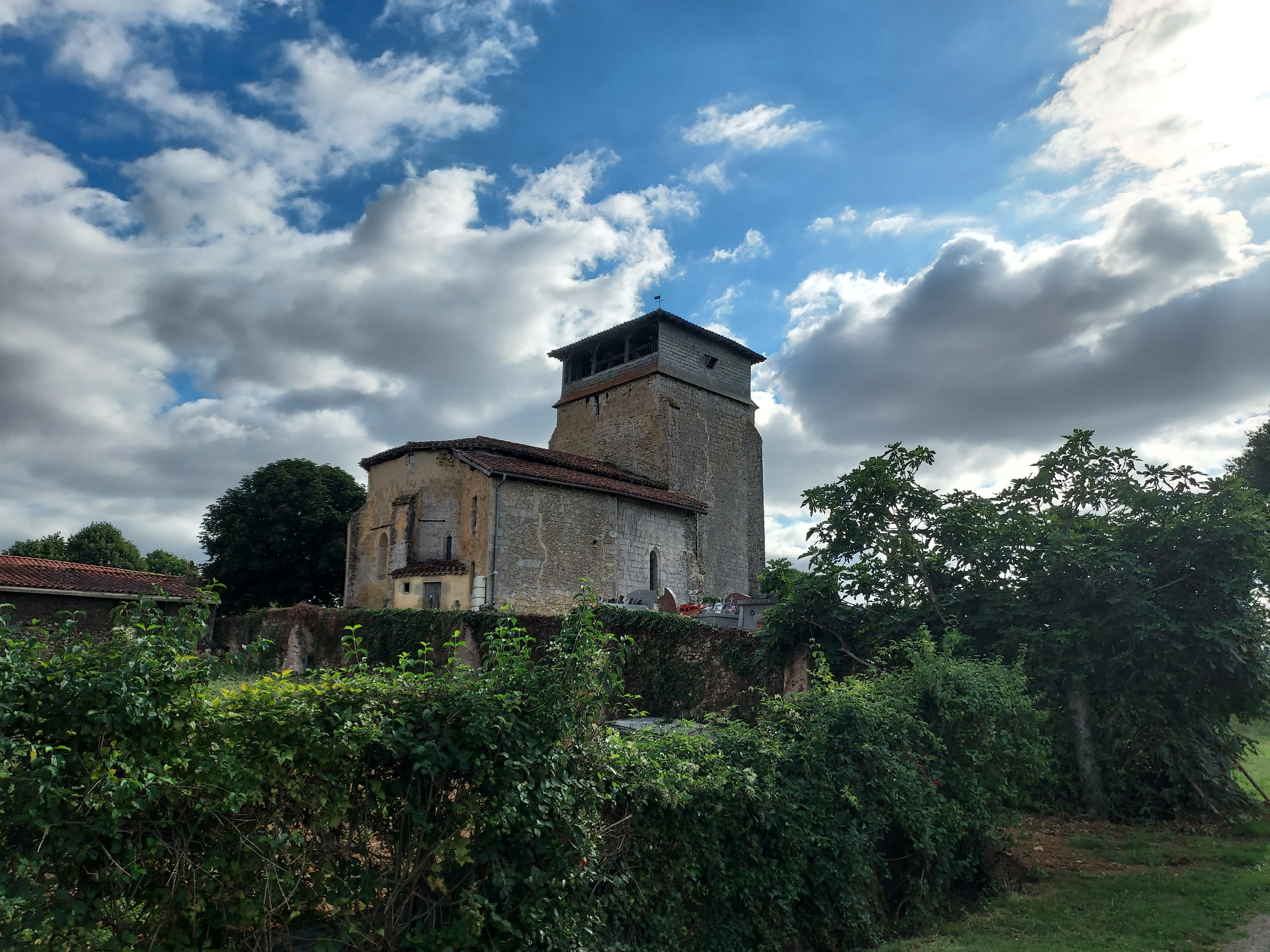
- The church in Cazaux-d'Anglès.

- Coat of arms
- Location of Cazaux-d'Anglès
- Location within France Location within Occitanie
- Coordinates: 43°39′29″N 0°15′37″E
- Country: France
- Region: Occitania
- Department: Gers
- Arrondissement: Auch
- Canton: Fezensac
- Intercommunality: Artagnan en Fézensac

Government
  - Mayor (2020–2026): Jean-Claude Theulé
- Area^{1}: 12.6 km^{2} (4.9 sq mi)
- Elevation: 300 m (980 ft)
- Highest elevation: 234 m (768 ft)
- Lowest elevation: 130 m (430 ft)
- Population (2023): 112
  - Density: 8.89/km^{2} (23.0/sq mi)
- Time zone: UTC+01:00 (CET)
  - Summer (DST): UTC+02:00 (CEST)
- INSEE/Postal code: 32097 /32190
- ^{1} French Land Register data, which excludes lakes, ponds, glaciers > 1 km^{2} (0.386 sq mi or 247 acres) and river estuaries.

Cazaux-d'Anglès (French pronunciation: [kazo dɑ̃ɡlɛs]; Occitan: Casaus) is a commune in the Gers department in southwestern France.

== Geography ==
The Auzoue forms most of the commune's western border. The Guiroue, a tributary of the Osse, flows north through the middle of the commune.

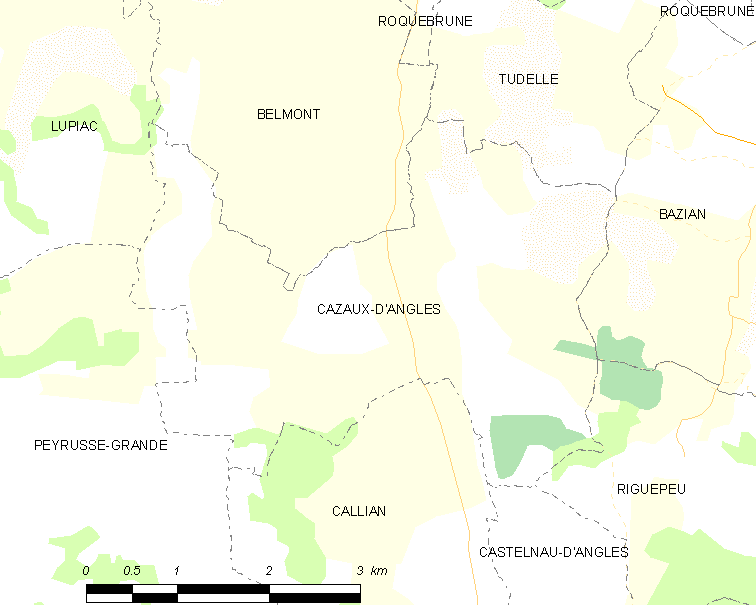
Cazaux-d'Anglès and its surrounding communes

== Population ==
Historical population
Year	Pop.	±% p.a.
1968	172	—
1975	130	−3.92%
1982	124	−0.67%
1990	120	−0.41%
1999	116	−0.38%
2007	147	+3.00%
2012	121	−3.82%
2017	119	−0.33%
2023	112	−1.01%
Source: INSEE

== See also ==
- Communes of the Gers department
