= Belmont, Gers =

Belmont
- Commune
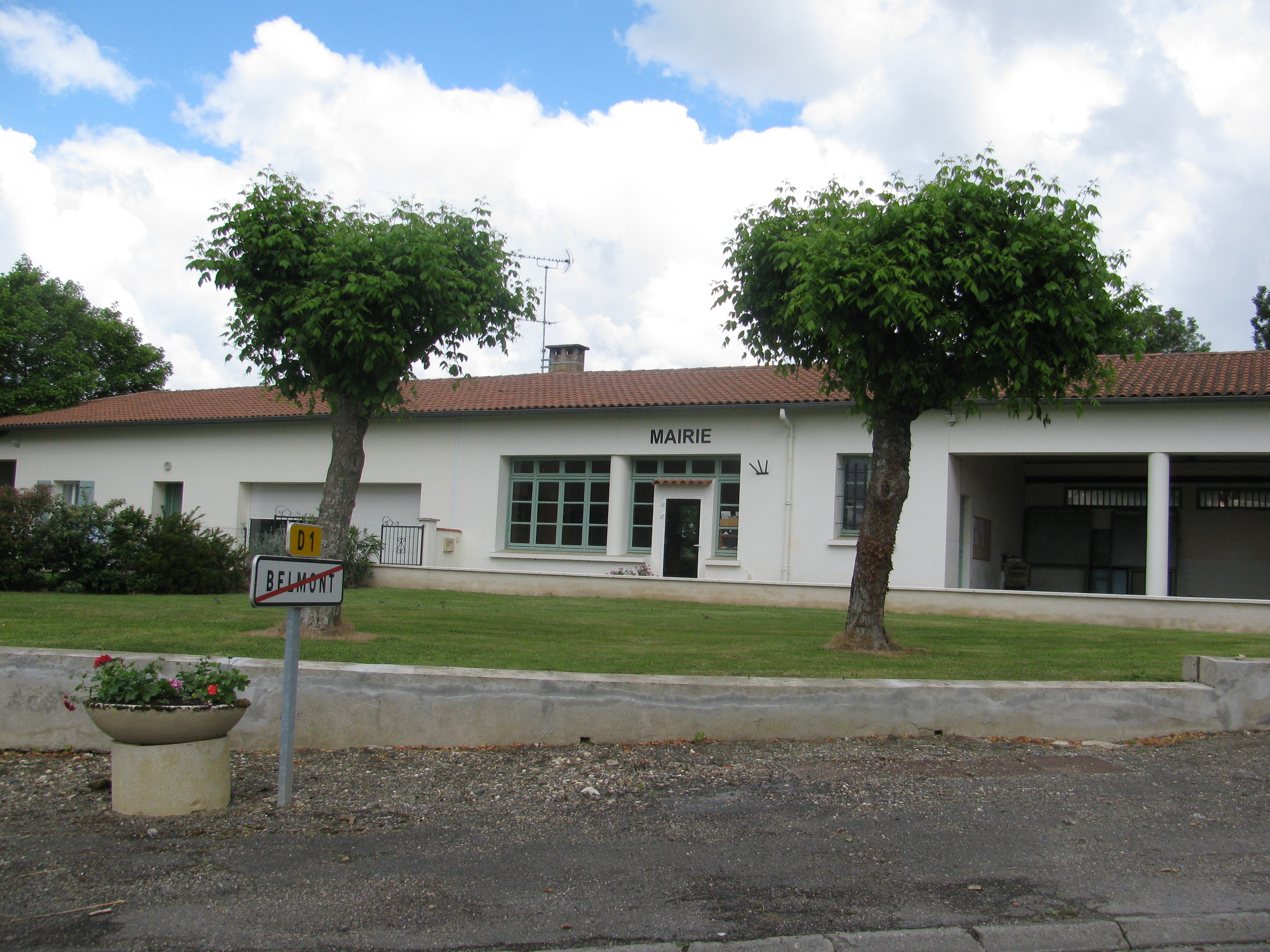
- The town hall in Belmont
- Location of Belmont
- Location within France Location within Occitanie
- Coordinates: 43°41′26″N 0°14′26″E
- Country: France
- Region: Occitania
- Department: Gers
- Arrondissement: Auch
- Canton: Fezensac
- Intercommunality: Artagnan de Fézensac

Government
  - Mayor (2020–2026): Jean-Pierre Doat
- Area^{1}: 15.1 km^{2} (5.8 sq mi)
- Elevation: 182 m (597 ft)
- Highest elevation: 212 m (696 ft)
- Lowest elevation: 130 m (430 ft)
- Population (2023): 149
  - Density: 9.87/km^{2} (25.6/sq mi)
- Time zone: UTC+01:00 (CET)
  - Summer (DST): UTC+02:00 (CEST)
- INSEE/Postal code: 32043 /32190
- ^{1} French Land Register data, which excludes lakes, ponds, glaciers > 1 km^{2} (0.386 sq mi or 247 acres) and river estuaries.

Belmont (French pronunciation: [bɛlmɔ̃]; Occitan: Bèlmont) is a commune in the Gers department in southwestern France.

== Geography ==
The Auzoue forms most of the commune's western border.

The Guiroue, a tributary of the Osse, forms most of the commune's eastern border.

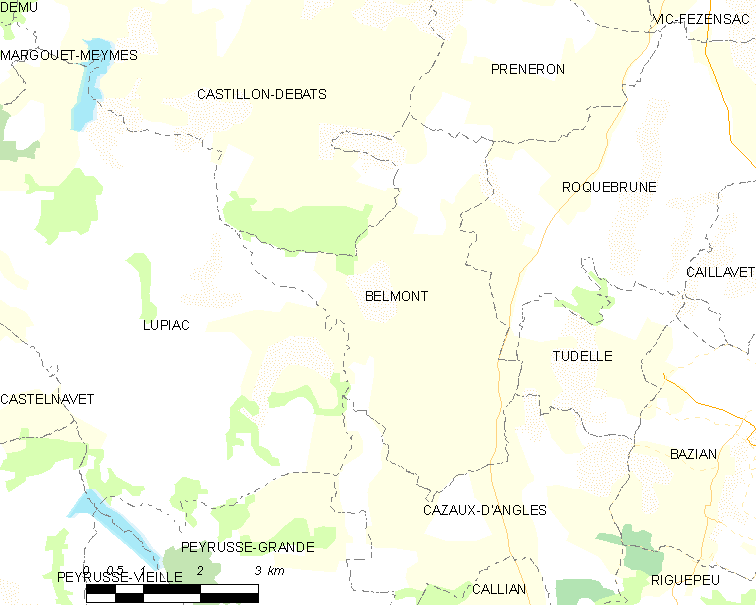
Belmont and its surrounding communes

== Population ==
Historical population
Year	Pop.	±% p.a.
1968	246	—
1975	225	−1.27%
1982	191	−2.31%
1990	165	−1.81%
1999	150	−1.05%
2007	150	+0.00%
2012	151	+0.13%
2017	150	−0.13%
2023	149	−0.11%
Source: INSEE

== See also ==
- Communes of the Gers department
