= Demu =

Demu may refer to:

- Dému, a village in France
- Demǔ 地母, "Mother Earth", Chinese goddess
- Diesel electric multiple unit (DEMU)
- The alien antagonists of The Demu Trilogy by F.M. Busby
- Demu, used in East Africa to refer to a woman
