= Mézin =

Commune in Nouvelle-Aquitaine, France

- Commune
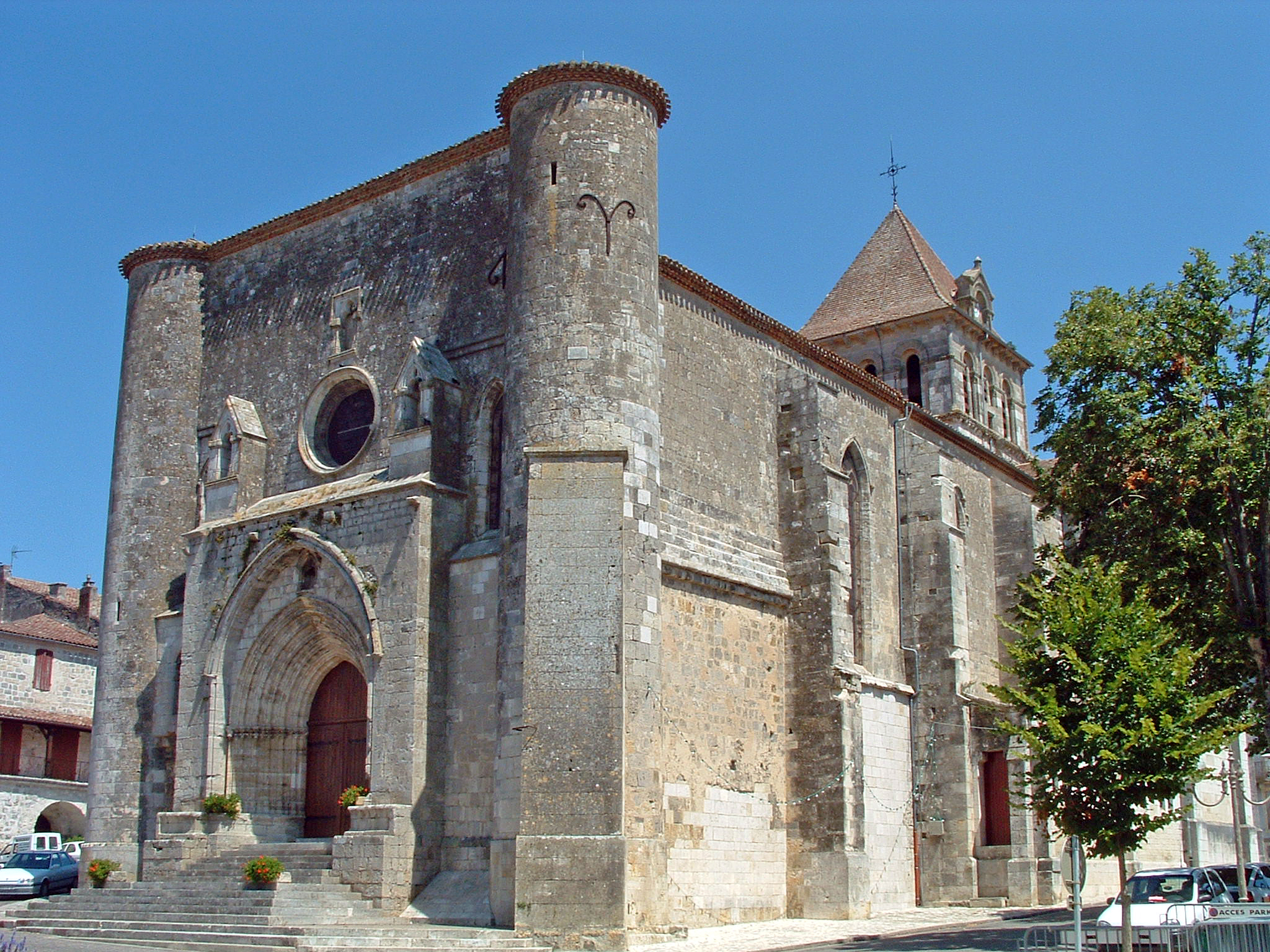
- The church in Mézin

- Coat of arms
- Location of Mézin
- Location within France Location within Nouvelle-Aquitaine
- Coordinates: 44°03′27″N 0°15′33″E
- Country: France
- Region: Nouvelle-Aquitaine
- Department: Lot-et-Garonne
- Arrondissement: Nérac
- Canton: L'Albret
- Intercommunality: Albret Communauté

Government
  - Mayor (2020–2026): Jacques Lambert
- Area^{1}: 31.58 km^{2} (12.19 sq mi)
- Elevation: 140 m (460 ft)
- Highest elevation: 166 m (545 ft)
- Lowest elevation: 49 m (161 ft)
- Population (2023): 1,433
  - Density: 45.38/km^{2} (117.5/sq mi)
- Time zone: UTC+01:00 (CET)
  - Summer (DST): UTC+02:00 (CEST)
- INSEE/Postal code: 47167 /47170
- ^{1} French Land Register data, which excludes lakes, ponds, glaciers > 1 km^{2} (0.386 sq mi or 247 acres) and river estuaries.

Mézin (French pronunciation: [mezɛ̃]; Occitan: Mesin) is a commune in the Lot-et-Garonne department in Nouvelle-Aquitaine, south-western France. It is part of the arrondissement of Nerac.

== Geography ==
The Auzoue flows into the Gélise in the commune. The Gélise forms most of the commune's western border.

== Demography ==
Historical population
Year	Pop.	±% p.a.
1968	1,976	—
1975	1,800	−1.32%
1982	1,609	−1.59%
1990	1,455	−1.25%
1999	1,461	+0.05%
2007	1,523	+0.52%
2012	1,521	−0.03%
2017	1,554	+0.43%
2023	1,433	−1.34%
Source: INSEE

== See also ==
- Communes of the Lot-et-Garonne department
