= Bassoues =

- Commune
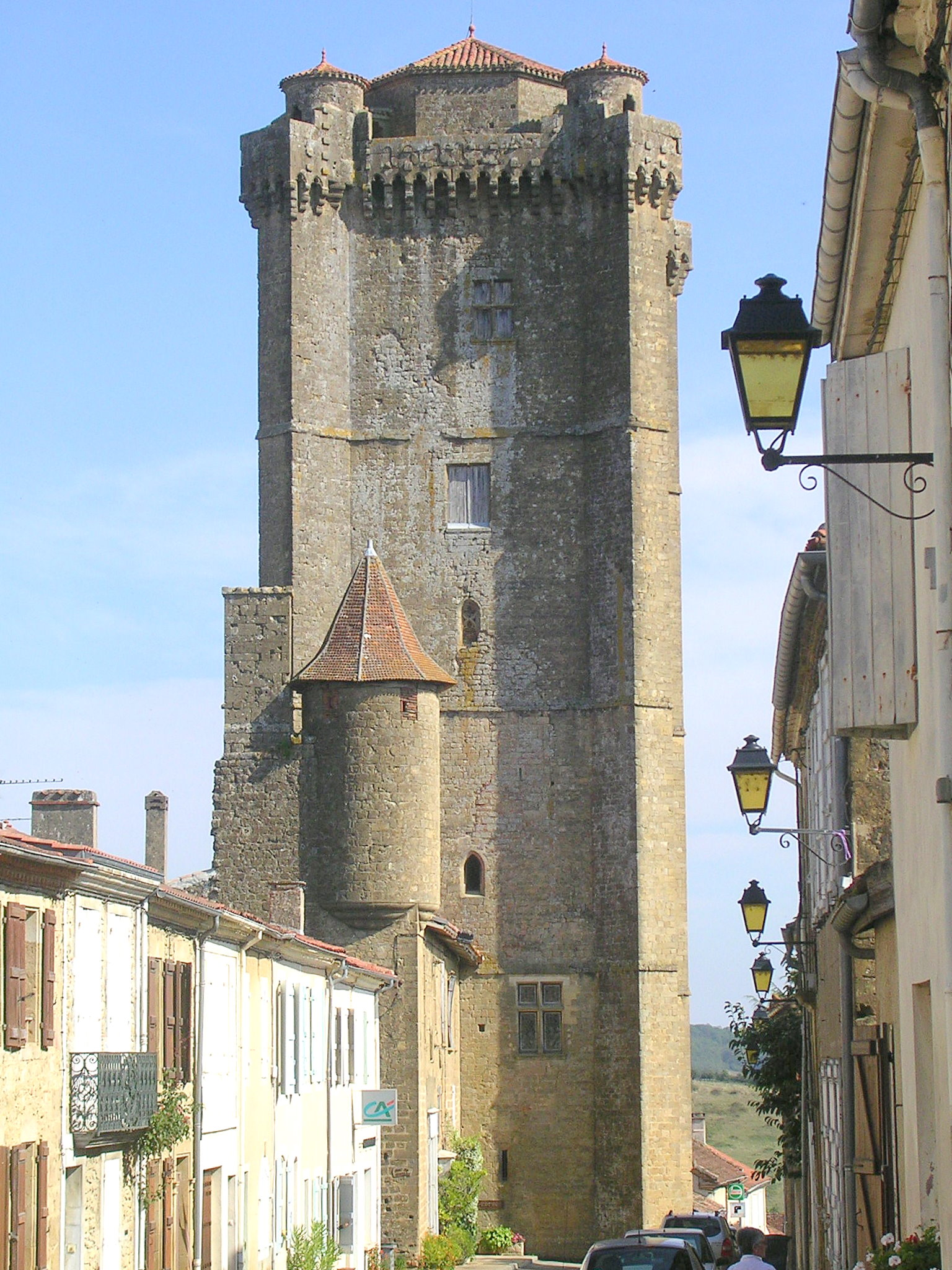
- The chateau tower in Bassoues

- Coat of arms
- Location of Bassoues
- Location within France Location within Occitanie
- Coordinates: 43°34′48″N 0°14′46″E
- Country: France
- Region: Occitania
- Department: Gers
- Arrondissement: Mirande
- Canton: Pardiac-Rivière-Basse
- Intercommunality: Cœur d'Astarac en Gascogne

Government
  - Mayor (2020–2026): Claude Gatelet
- Area^{1}: 32.29 km^{2} (12.47 sq mi)
- Elevation: 220 m (720 ft)
- Highest elevation: 287 m (942 ft)
- Lowest elevation: 150 m (490 ft)
- Population (2023): 334
  - Density: 10.3/km^{2} (26.8/sq mi)
- Time zone: UTC+01:00 (CET)
  - Summer (DST): UTC+02:00 (CEST)
- INSEE/Postal code: 32032 /32320
- ^{1} French Land Register data, which excludes lakes, ponds, glaciers > 1 km^{2} (0.386 sq mi or 247 acres) and river estuaries.

Bassoues (French pronunciation: [basu]; Occitan: Bassoas) is a commune in the Gers department in southwestern France.

== Geography ==
The Auzoue, a tributary of the Gélise, has its source in the southwestern part of the commune. The Guiroue, another tributary of the Gélise, flows north through the eastern part of the commune. The Barade, a stream, tributary of the Guirou, forms the commune's eastern border.

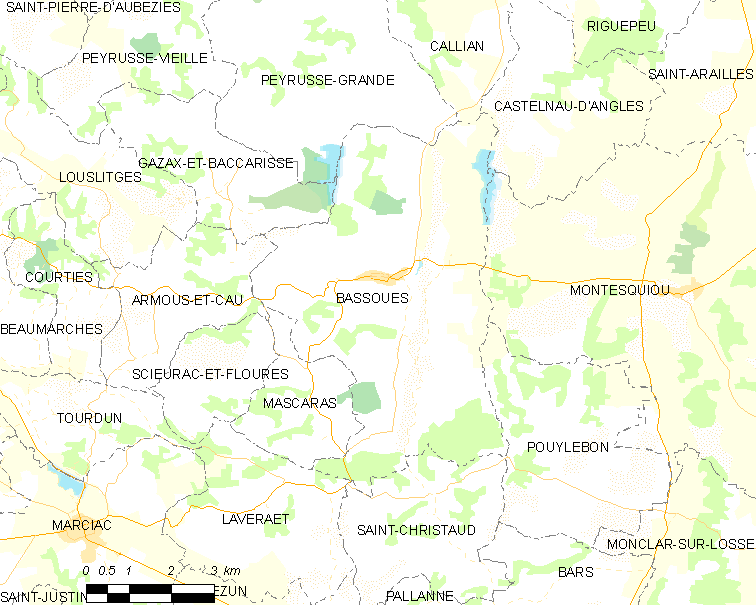
Bassoues and its surrounding communes

== Population ==
Historical population
Year	Pop.	±% p.a.
1968	568	—
1975	512	−1.47%
1982	503	−0.25%
1990	454	−1.27%
1999	376	−2.07%
2007	401	+0.81%
2012	326	−4.06%
2017	321	−0.31%
2023	334	+0.66%
Source: INSEE

== See also ==
- Communes of the Gers department
