= Courrensan =

- Commune
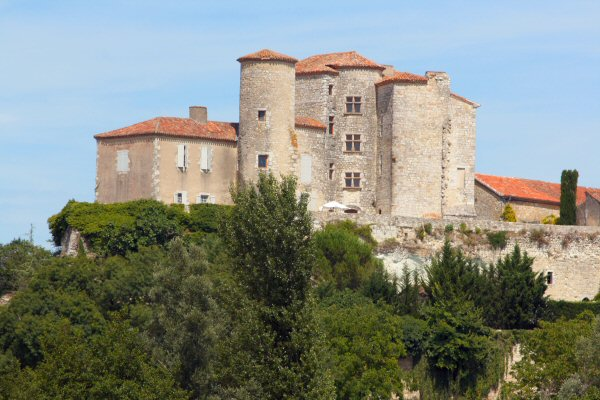
- Chateau
- Location of Courrensan
- Location within France Location within Occitanie
- Coordinates: 43°51′00″N 0°14′37″E
- Country: France
- Region: Occitania
- Department: Gers
- Arrondissement: Condom
- Canton: Fezensac

Government
  - Mayor (2020–2026): Bernard Tauziede
- Area^{1}: 25.16 km^{2} (9.71 sq mi)
- Elevation: 245 m (804 ft)
- Highest elevation: 178 m (584 ft)
- Lowest elevation: 95 m (312 ft)
- Population (2023): 391
  - Density: 15.5/km^{2} (40.2/sq mi)
- Time zone: UTC+01:00 (CET)
  - Summer (DST): UTC+02:00 (CEST)
- INSEE/Postal code: 32110 /32330
- ^{1} French Land Register data, which excludes lakes, ponds, glaciers > 1 km^{2} (0.386 sq mi or 247 acres) and river estuaries.

Courrensan (French pronunciation: [kuʁɑ̃sɑ̃]; Occitan: Corrençan) is a commune in the Gers department in southwestern France.

== Geography ==
The Auzoue forms part of the commune's southern border, then flows north-northwest through the middle of the commune.

The village lies in the middle of the commune, on the right bank of the Auzoue.

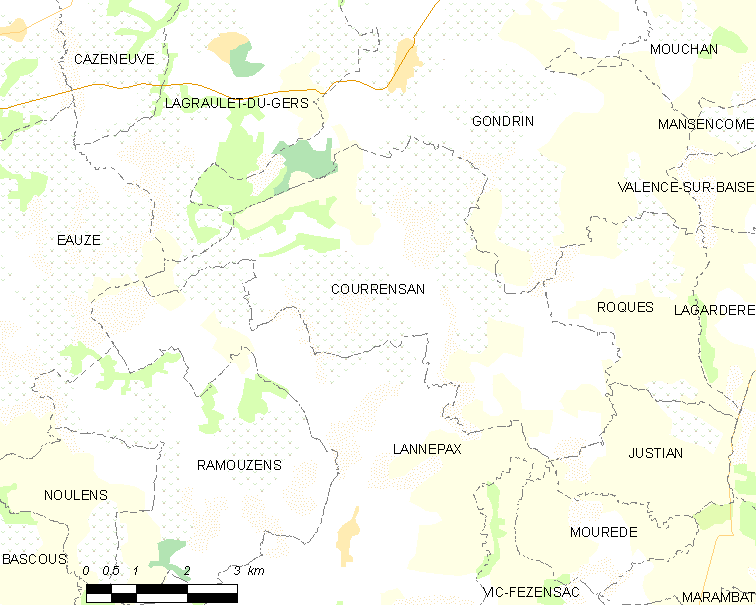
Courrensan and its surrounding communes

== Population ==
Historical population
Year	Pop.	±% p.a.
1968	461	—
1975	457	−0.12%
1982	383	−2.49%
1990	369	−0.46%
1999	375	+0.18%
2007	374	−0.03%
2012	406	+1.66%
2017	403	−0.15%
2023	391	−0.50%
Source: INSEE

== See also ==
- Communes of the Gers department
