= Auzoue =

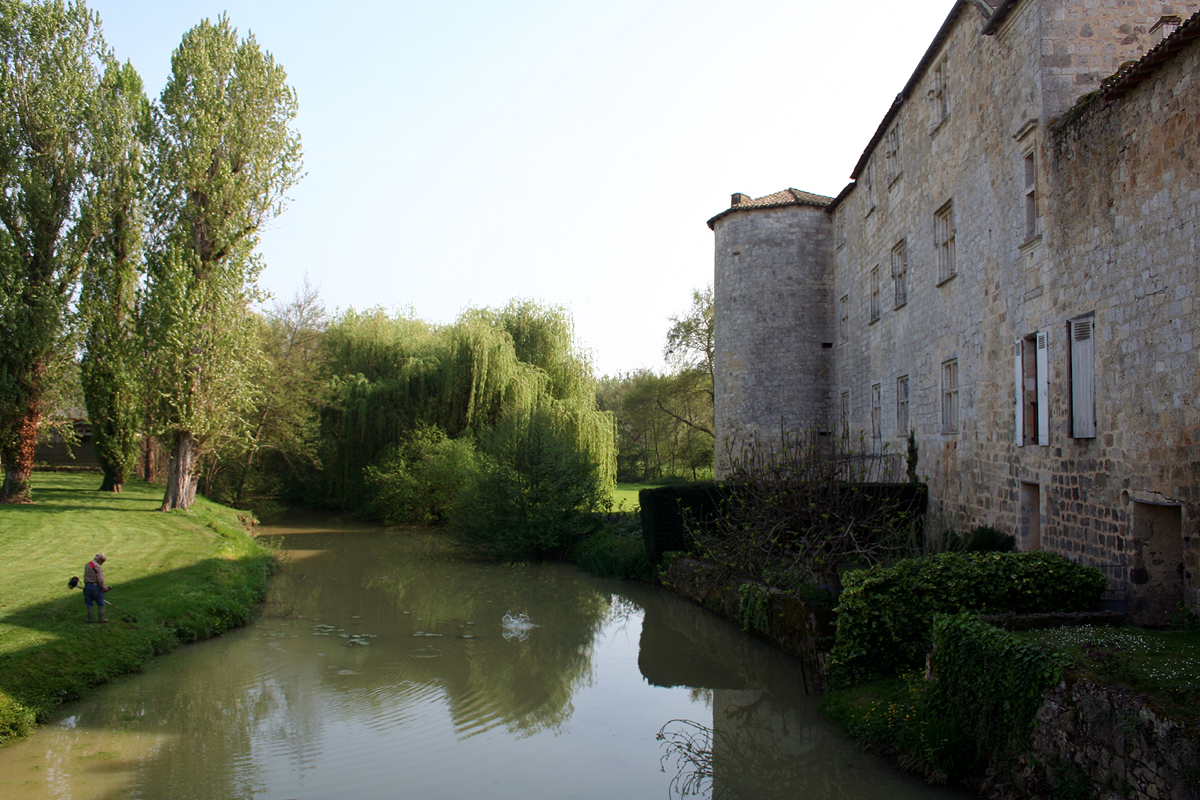
- The Auzoue at Fourcès

- Location within France Location within Nouvelle-Aquitaine

Location
- Country: France

Physical characteristics
- Source
  - location: Bassoues
  - coordinates: 43°33′54″N 00°13′13″E
  - elevation: 240 m (790 ft)
- Mouth
  - location: Gélise
  - coordinates: 44°03′22″N 00°14′47″E
  - elevation: 55 m (180 ft)
- Length: 74.3 km (46.2 mi)
- Basin size: 283 km^{2} (109 sq mi)

Basin features
- Progression: Gélise→ Baïse→ Garonne→ Gironde estuary→ Atlantic Ocean

The Auzoue (French pronunciation: [ozu]) is a 74.3-kilometre (46.2 mi) long river in the Gers and Lot-et-Garonne départements, southwestern France. Its source is at Bassoues. It flows generally north. It is a right tributary of the Gélise into which it flows at Mézin.

== Départements and communes along its course ==
This list is ordered from source to mouth:

- Gers: Bassoues, Peyrusse-Grande, Cazaux-d'Anglès, Lupiac, Belmont, Castillon-Debats, Préneron, Vic-Fezensac, Lannepax, Courrensan, Gondrin, Lagraulet-du-Gers, Montréal, Fourcès
- Lot-et-Garonne: Lannes, Mézin
