= Lannes, Lot-et-Garonne =

Lannes
- Commune
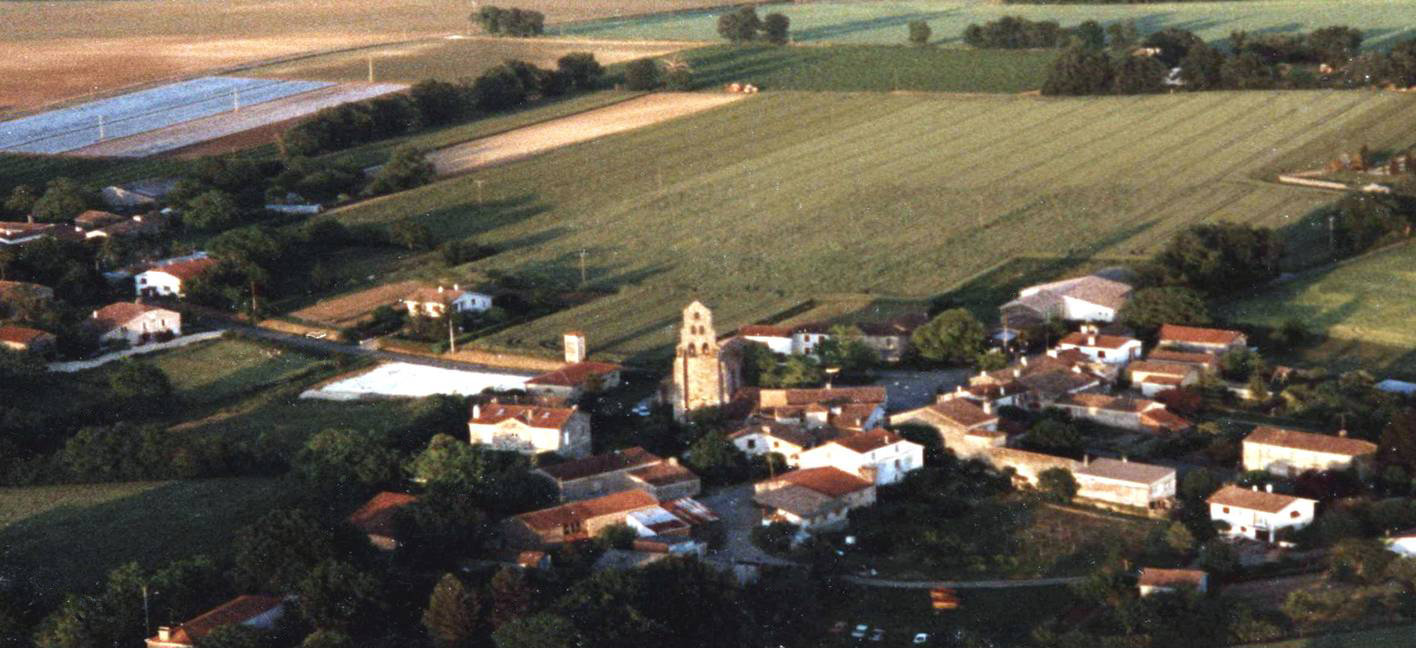
- An aerial view of Lannes
- Location of Lannes
- Location within France Location within Nouvelle-Aquitaine
- Coordinates: 44°02′10″N 0°17′39″E
- Country: France
- Region: Nouvelle-Aquitaine
- Department: Lot-et-Garonne
- Arrondissement: Nérac
- Canton: L'Albret
- Intercommunality: Albret Communauté

Government
  - Mayor (2020–2026): Jacques Echeverria
- Area^{1}: 32.4 km^{2} (12.5 sq mi)
- Elevation: 75 m (246 ft)
- Highest elevation: 171 m (561 ft)
- Lowest elevation: 58 m (190 ft)
- Population (2023): 359
  - Density: 11.1/km^{2} (28.7/sq mi)
- Time zone: UTC+01:00 (CET)
  - Summer (DST): UTC+02:00 (CEST)
- INSEE/Postal code: 47134 /47170
- ^{1} French Land Register data, which excludes lakes, ponds, glaciers > 1 km^{2} (0.386 sq mi or 247 acres) and river estuaries.

Lannes (French pronunciation: [lan]; Occitan: Lanas) is a commune in the Lot-et-Garonne department in south-western France.

== Geography ==
The Auzoue forms part of the commune's southwestern border. The Osse forms the commune's eastern border.

== See also ==
- Communes of the Lot-et-Garonne department
