= Préneron =

- Commune
- Location of Préneron
- Location within France Location within Occitanie
- Coordinates: 43°43′39″N 0°16′40″E
- Country: France
- Region: Occitania
- Department: Gers
- Arrondissement: Auch
- Canton: Fezensac
- Intercommunality: Artagnan en Fézensac

Government
  - Mayor (2020–2026): Guy Favarel
- Area^{1}: 8.63 km^{2} (3.33 sq mi)
- Elevation: 170 m (560 ft)
- Highest elevation: 201 m (659 ft)
- Lowest elevation: 115 m (377 ft)
- Population (2023): 119
  - Density: 13.8/km^{2} (35.7/sq mi)
- Time zone: UTC+01:00 (CET)
  - Summer (DST): UTC+02:00 (CEST)
- INSEE/Postal code: 32332 /32190
- ^{1} French Land Register data, which excludes lakes, ponds, glaciers > 1 km^{2} (0.386 sq mi or 247 acres) and river estuaries.

Préneron (French pronunciation: [pʁen(ə)ʁɔ̃]; Occitan: Preneron) is a commune in the Gers department in southwestern France.

== Geography ==
=== Localisation ===
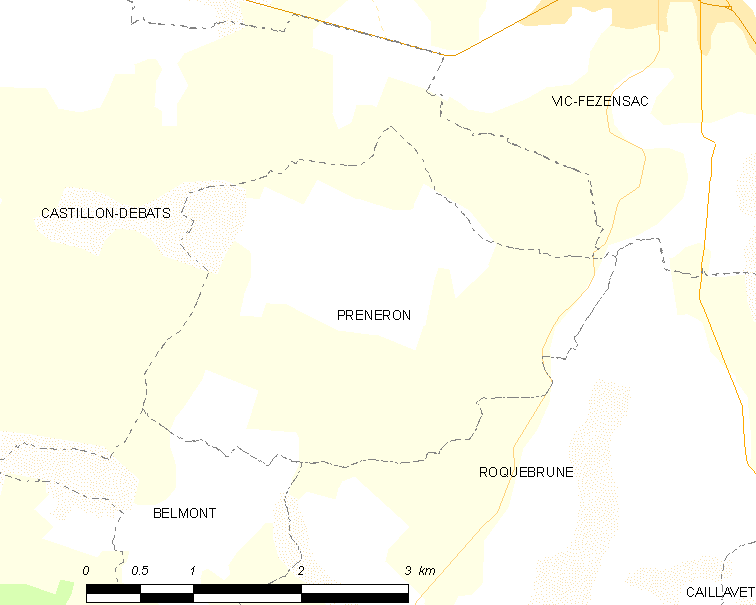
Préneron and its surrounding communes

=== Hydrography ===
The Auzoue flows north through the western part of the commune.

== Population ==
Historical population
Year	Pop.	±% p.a.
1968	105	—
1975	113	+1.05%
1982	137	+2.79%
1990	132	−0.46%
1999	142	+0.81%
2007	140	−0.18%
2012	144	+0.57%
2017	135	−1.28%
2023	119	−2.08%
Source: INSEE

== See also ==
- Communes of the Gers department
