= Lannepax =

- Commune
- Location of Lannepax
- Location within France Location within Occitanie
- Coordinates: 43°48′N 0°14′E
- Country: France
- Region: Occitania
- Department: Gers
- Arrondissement: Condom
- Canton: Fezensac

Government
  - Mayor (2024–2026): Marianne Gicquiaud
- Area^{1}: 30.84 km^{2} (11.91 sq mi)
- Elevation: 182 m (597 ft)
- Highest elevation: 217 m (712 ft)
- Lowest elevation: 107 m (351 ft)
- Population (2023): 528
  - Density: 17.1/km^{2} (44.3/sq mi)
- Time zone: UTC+01:00 (CET)
  - Summer (DST): UTC+02:00 (CEST)
- INSEE/Postal code: 32190 /32190
- ^{1} French Land Register data, which excludes lakes, ponds, glaciers > 1 km^{2} (0.386 sq mi or 247 acres) and river estuaries.

Lannepax (French pronunciation: [lanpaks]; Occitan: Lanapatz) is a commune in the Gers department in southwestern France. It is the site of a distillery of Armagnac brandy.

== Geography ==
The Auzoue forms most of the commune's eastern border.

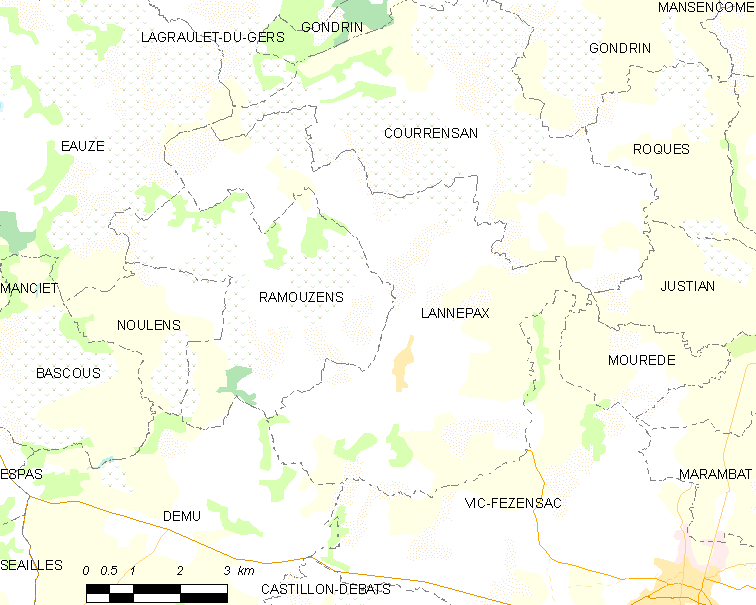
Lannepax and its surrounding communes

== Population ==
Historical population
Year	Pop.	±% p.a.
1968	744	—
1975	686	−1.15%
1982	652	−0.72%
1990	610	−0.83%
1999	569	−0.77%
2007	558	−0.24%
2012	537	−0.76%
2017	494	−1.66%
2023	528	+1.12%
Source: INSEE

== See also ==
- Communes of the Gers department
