= Castillon-Debats =

- Commune
- Location of Castillon-Debats
- Location within France Location within Occitanie
- Coordinates: 43°43′49″N 0°13′02″E
- Country: France
- Region: Occitania
- Department: Gers
- Arrondissement: Auch
- Canton: Fezensac
- Intercommunality: Artagnan de Fézensac

Government
  - Mayor (2020–2026): Hubert Raffin
- Area^{1}: 35.05 km^{2} (13.53 sq mi)
- Elevation: 223 m (732 ft)
- Highest elevation: 227 m (745 ft)
- Lowest elevation: 117 m (384 ft)
- Population (2023): 337
  - Density: 9.61/km^{2} (24.9/sq mi)
- Time zone: UTC+01:00 (CET)
  - Summer (DST): UTC+02:00 (CEST)
- INSEE/Postal code: 32088 /32190
- ^{1} French Land Register data, which excludes lakes, ponds, glaciers > 1 km^{2} (0.386 sq mi or 247 acres) and river estuaries.

Castillon-Debats is a commune in the Gers department in southwestern France.

== Geography ==
The Auzoue forms part of the commune's eastern border and flows north through its northeastern part.

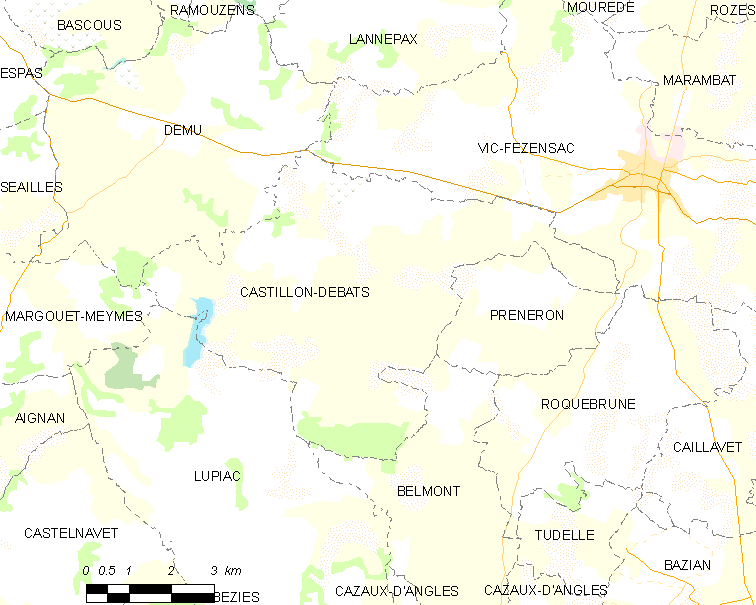
Castillon-Debats and its surrounding communes

== Population ==
Historical population
Year	Pop.	±% p.a.
1968	432	—
1975	371	−2.15%
1982	377	+0.23%
1990	348	−1.00%
1999	301	−1.60%
2007	321	+0.81%
2012	329	+0.49%
2017	323	−0.37%
2023	337	+0.71%
Source: INSEE

== See also ==
- Communes of the Gers department
