= Castillon-de-Larboust =

- Commune
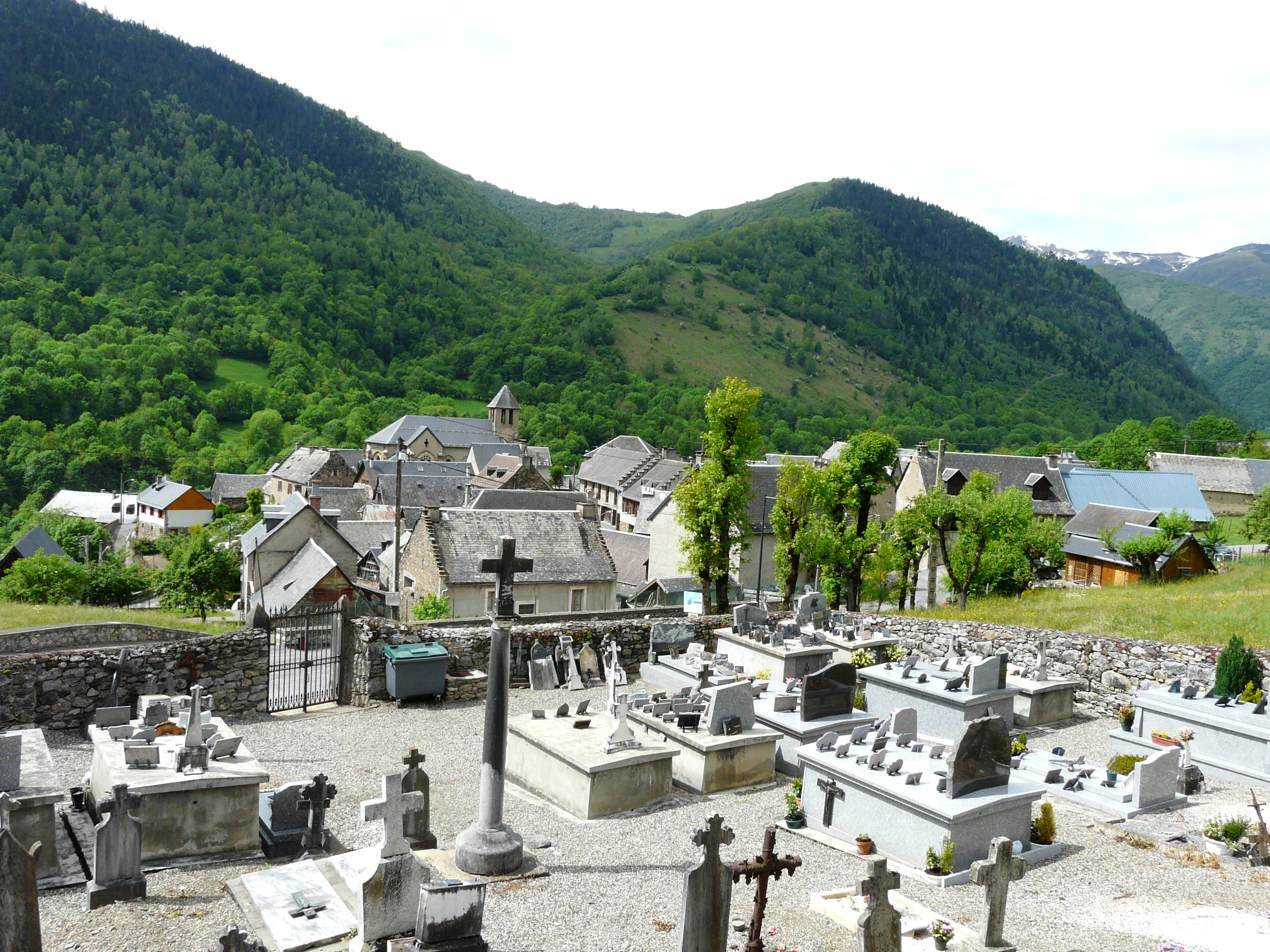
- A general view of Castillon-de-Larboust
- Location of Castillon-de-Larboust
- Location within France Location within Occitanie
- Coordinates: 42°48′25″N 0°32′05″E
- Country: France
- Region: Occitania
- Department: Haute-Garonne
- Arrondissement: Saint-Gaudens
- Canton: Bagnères-de-Luchon

Government
  - Mayor (2020–2026): Philippe Crampe
- Area^{1}: 20.67 km^{2} (7.98 sq mi)
- Elevation: 1,000 m (3,300 ft)
- Highest elevation: 3,110 m (10,200 ft)
- Lowest elevation: 877 m (2,877 ft)
- Population (2023): 84
  - Density: 4.1/km^{2} (11/sq mi)
- Time zone: UTC+01:00 (CET)
  - Summer (DST): UTC+02:00 (CEST)
- INSEE/Postal code: 31123 /31110
- ^{1} French Land Register data, which excludes lakes, ponds, glaciers > 1 km^{2} (0.386 sq mi or 247 acres) and river estuaries.

Castillon-de-Larboust (Occitan: Castilhon de Larbost) is a commune in the Haute-Garonne department in southwestern France.

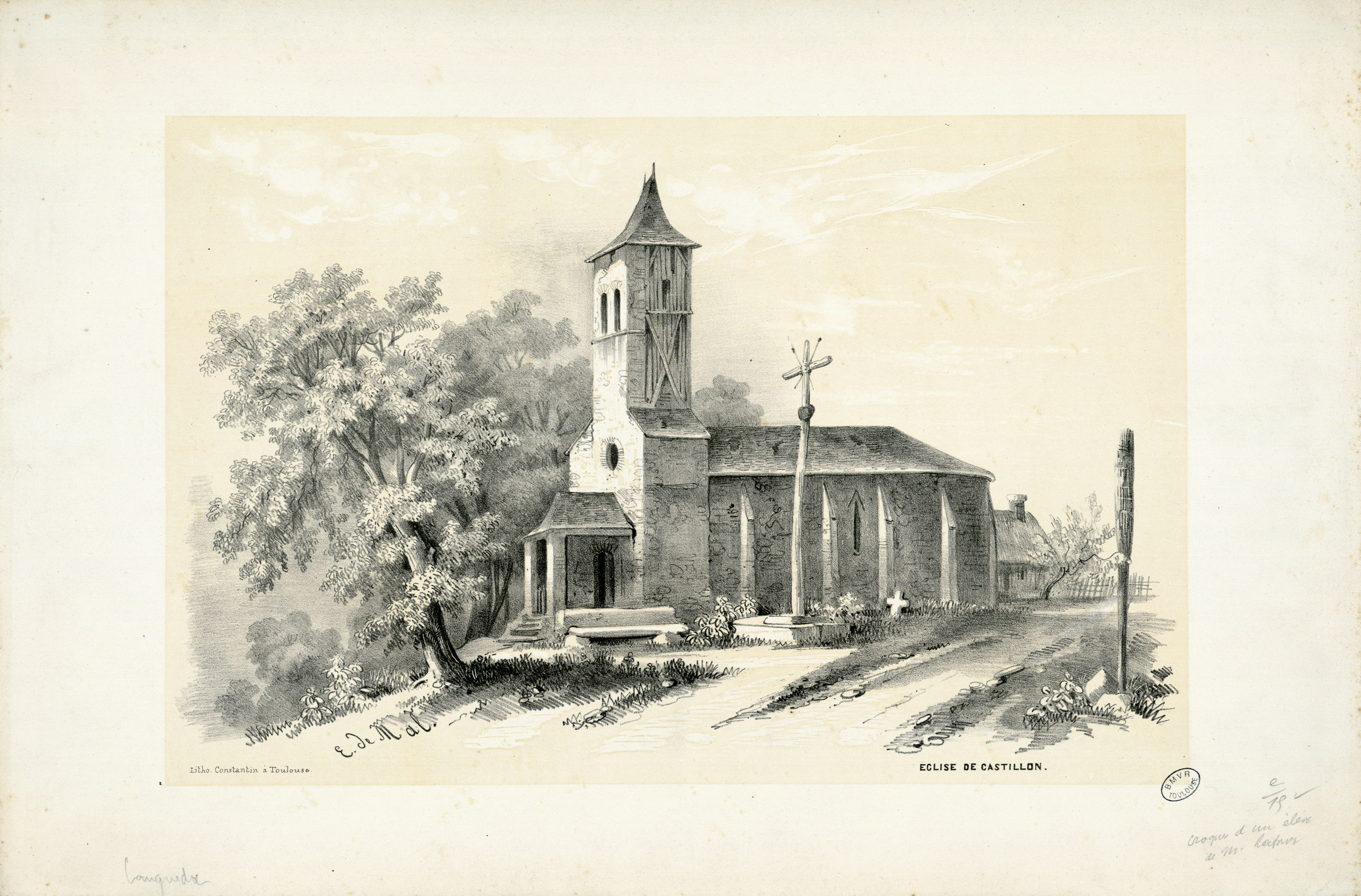
Church in 1840,
by Eugène de Malbos.

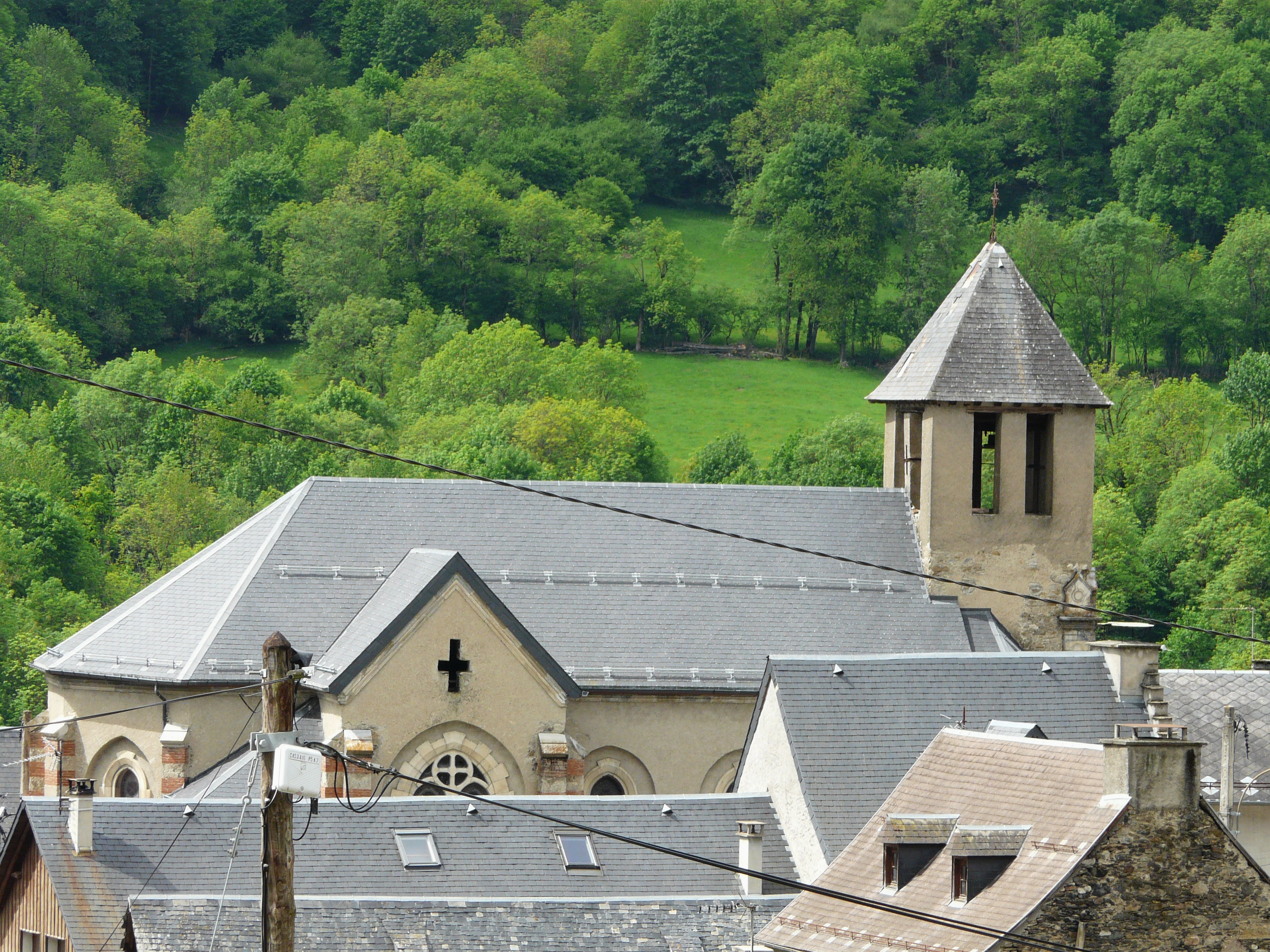
Church in 2010.

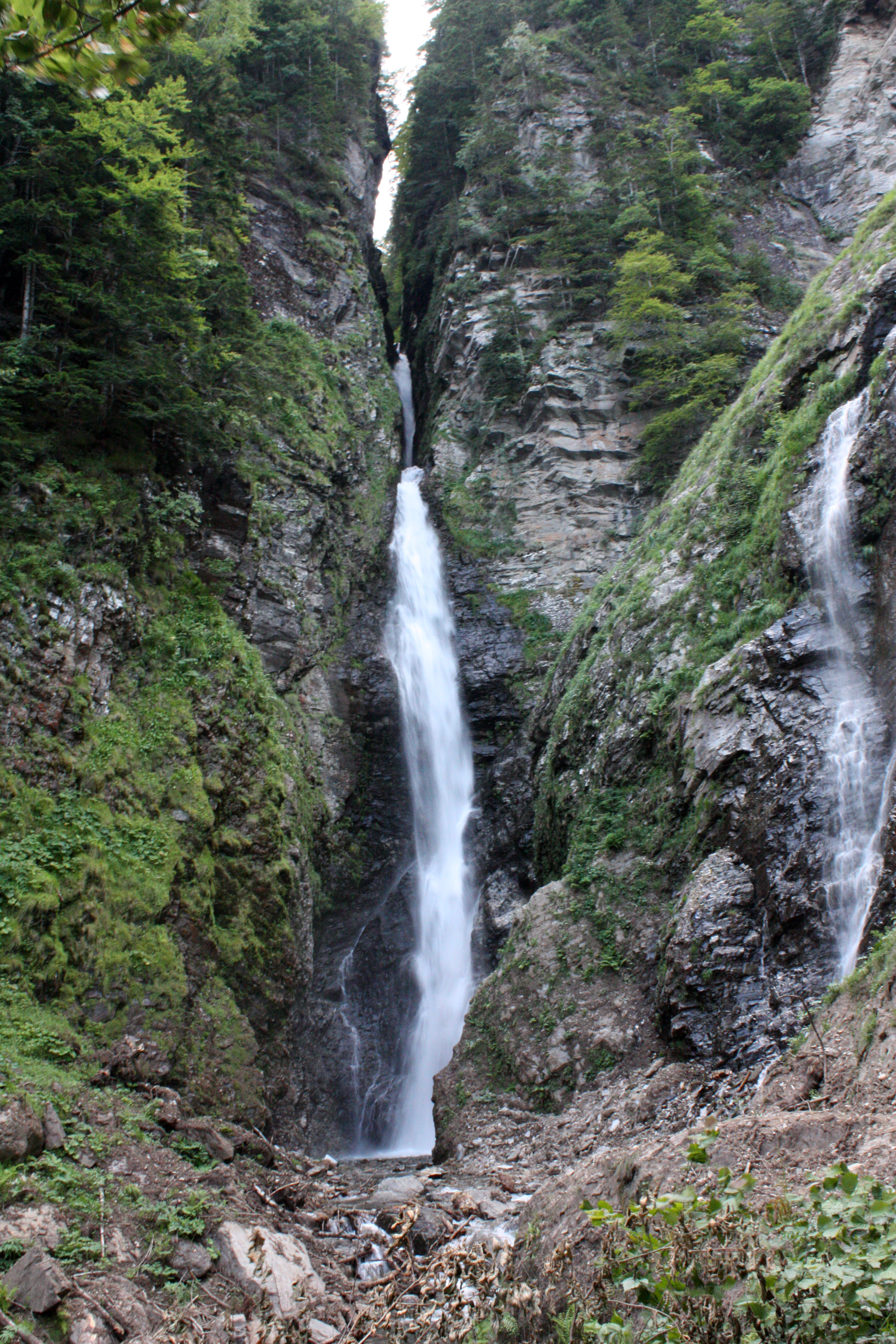
La cascade d'Enfer.

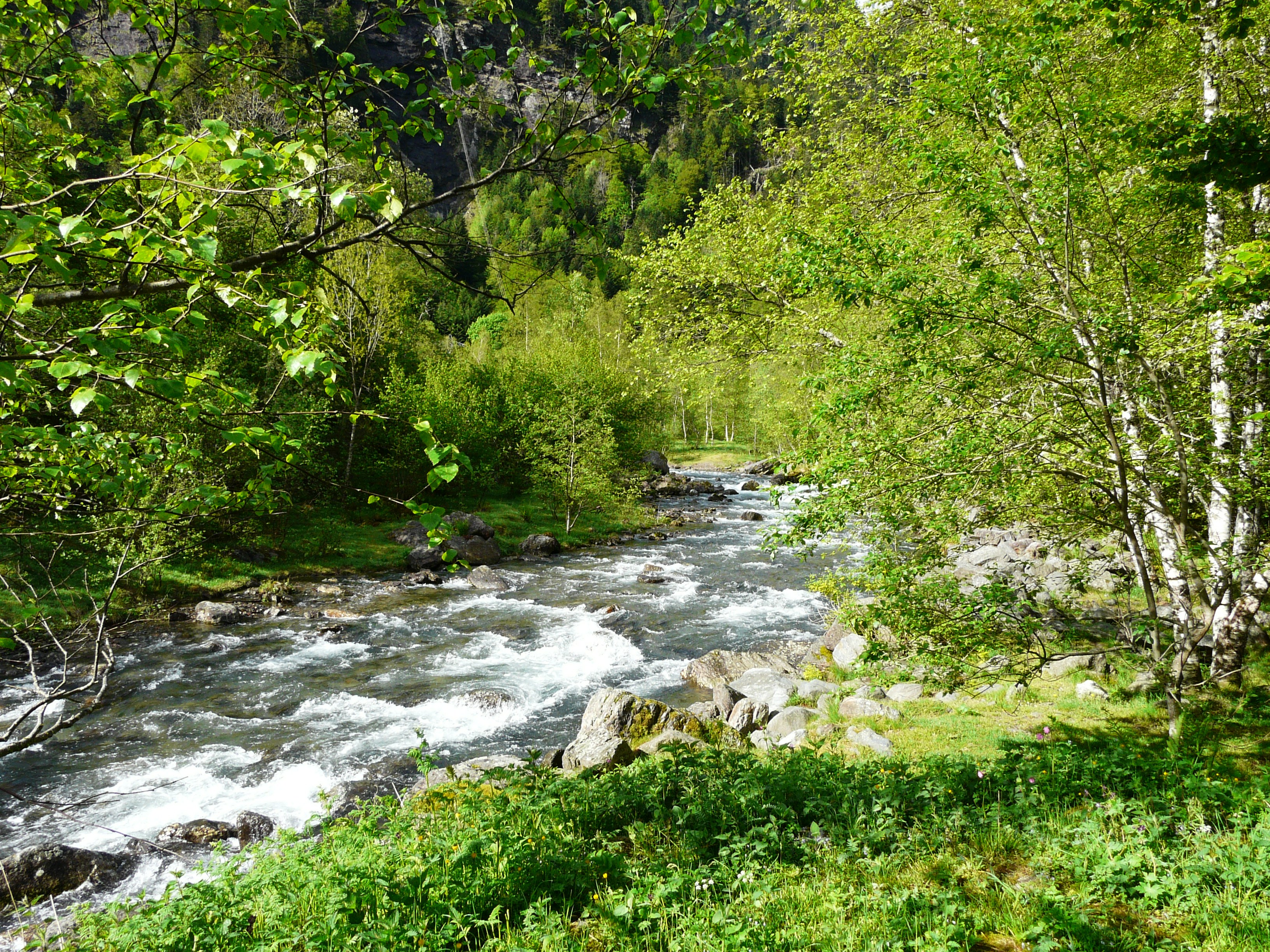
La vallée du Lis.

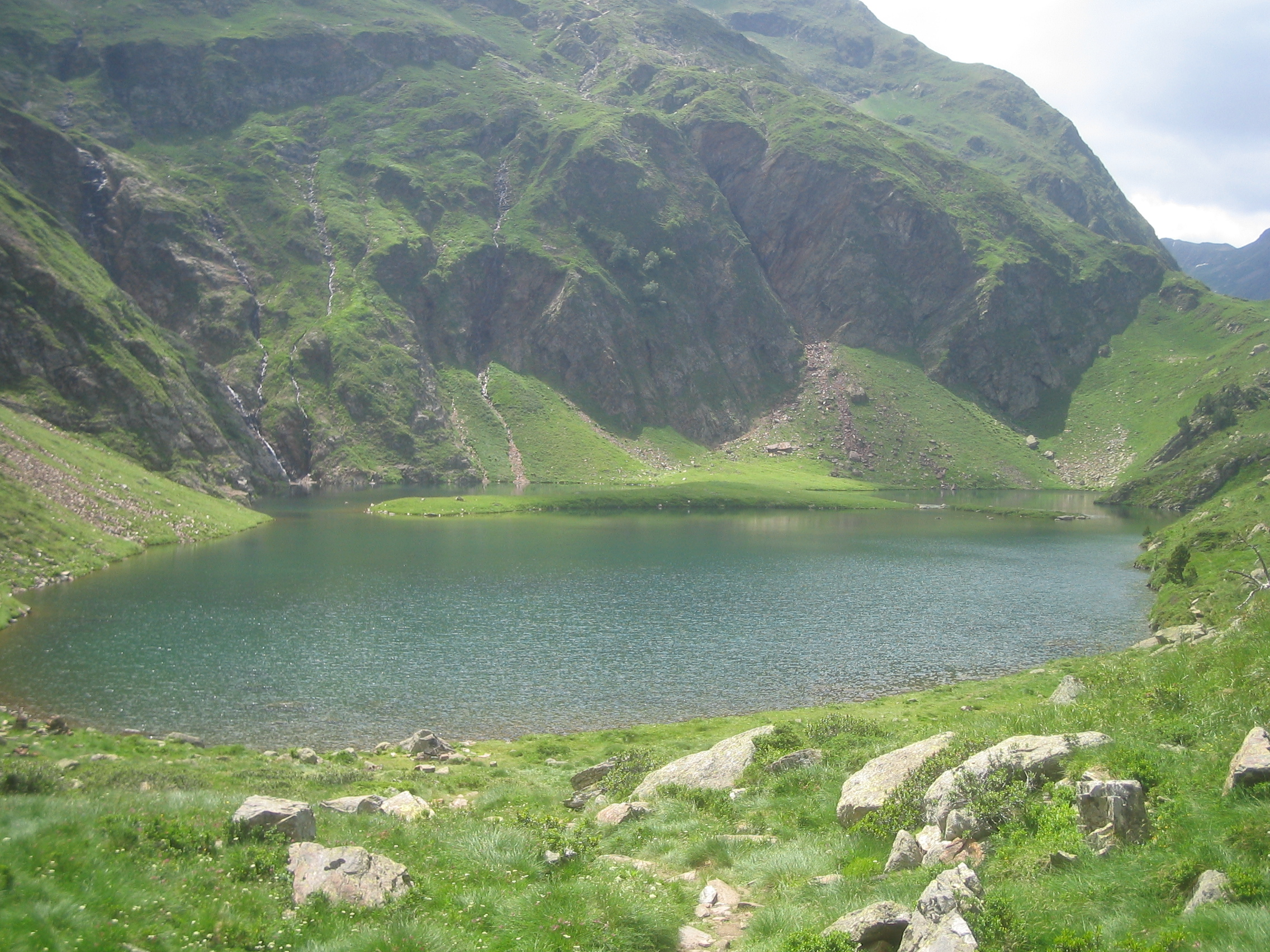
The Green lake.

== Population ==
Historical population
Year	Pop.	±% p.a.
1968	67	—
1975	63	−0.88%
1982	65	+0.45%
1990	86	+3.56%
1999	83	−0.39%
2007	67	−2.64%
2012	55	−3.87%
2017	63	+2.75%
2023	84	+4.91%
Source: INSEE

== See also ==
- Communes of the Haute-Garonne department
