= Peyrusse-Grande =

- Commune
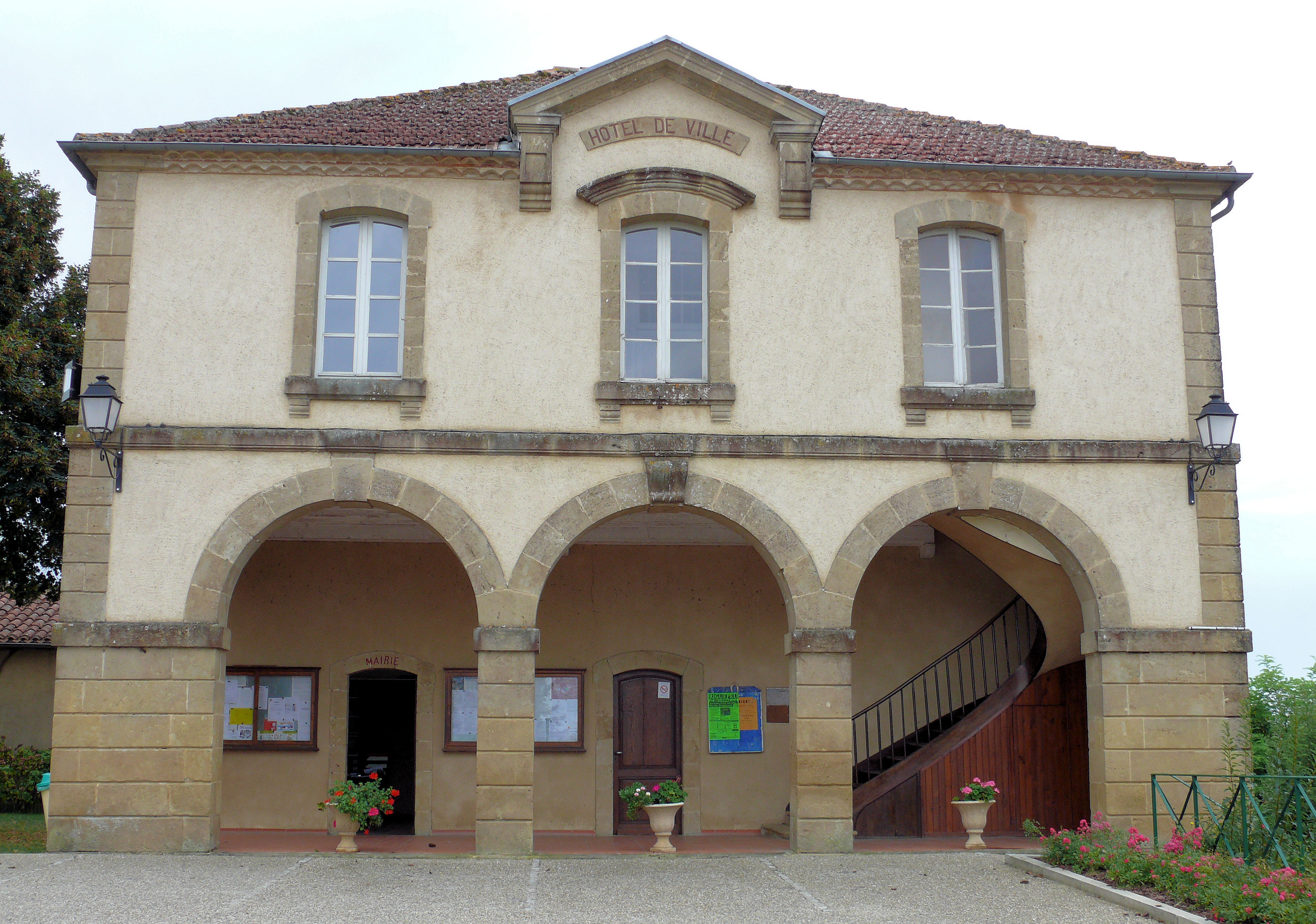
- Town hall
- Location of Peyrusse-Grande
- Location within France Location within Occitanie
- Coordinates: 43°38′00″N 0°12′54″E
- Country: France
- Region: Occitania
- Department: Gers
- Arrondissement: Auch
- Canton: Fezensac
- Intercommunality: Artagnan en Fézensac

Government
  - Mayor (2020–2026): William Villeneuve
- Area^{1}: 25.5 km^{2} (9.8 sq mi)
- Elevation: 245 m (804 ft)
- Highest elevation: 269 m (883 ft)
- Lowest elevation: 151 m (495 ft)
- Population (2023): 147
  - Density: 5.76/km^{2} (14.9/sq mi)
- Time zone: UTC+01:00 (CET)
  - Summer (DST): UTC+02:00 (CEST)
- INSEE/Postal code: 32315 /32320
- ^{1} French Land Register data, which excludes lakes, ponds, glaciers > 1 km^{2} (0.386 sq mi or 247 acres) and river estuaries.

Peyrusse-Grande (French pronunciation: [peʁys ɡʁɑ̃d]; Occitan: Peirussa Grana) is a commune in the Gers department in southwestern France.

== Geography ==
=== Localisation ===
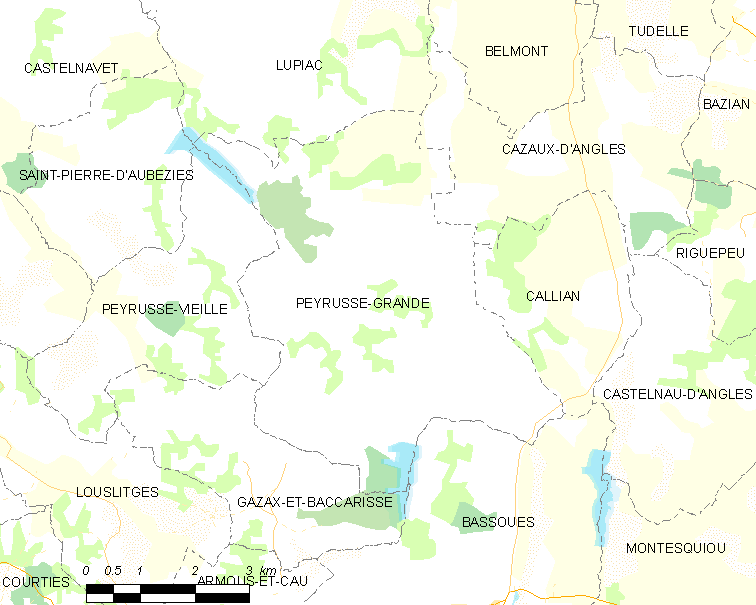
Peyrusse-Grande and its surrounding communes

=== Hydrography ===
The Auzoue forms part of the commune's eastern border.

The Douze forms most of the commune's western border.

== Population ==
Historical population
Year	Pop.	±% p.a.
1968	316	—
1975	302	−0.65%
1982	234	−3.58%
1990	211	−1.28%
1999	210	−0.05%
2007	185	−1.57%
2012	153	−3.73%
2017	164	+1.40%
2023	147	−1.81%
Source: INSEE

== See also ==
- Communes of the Gers department
