= Osse (river) =

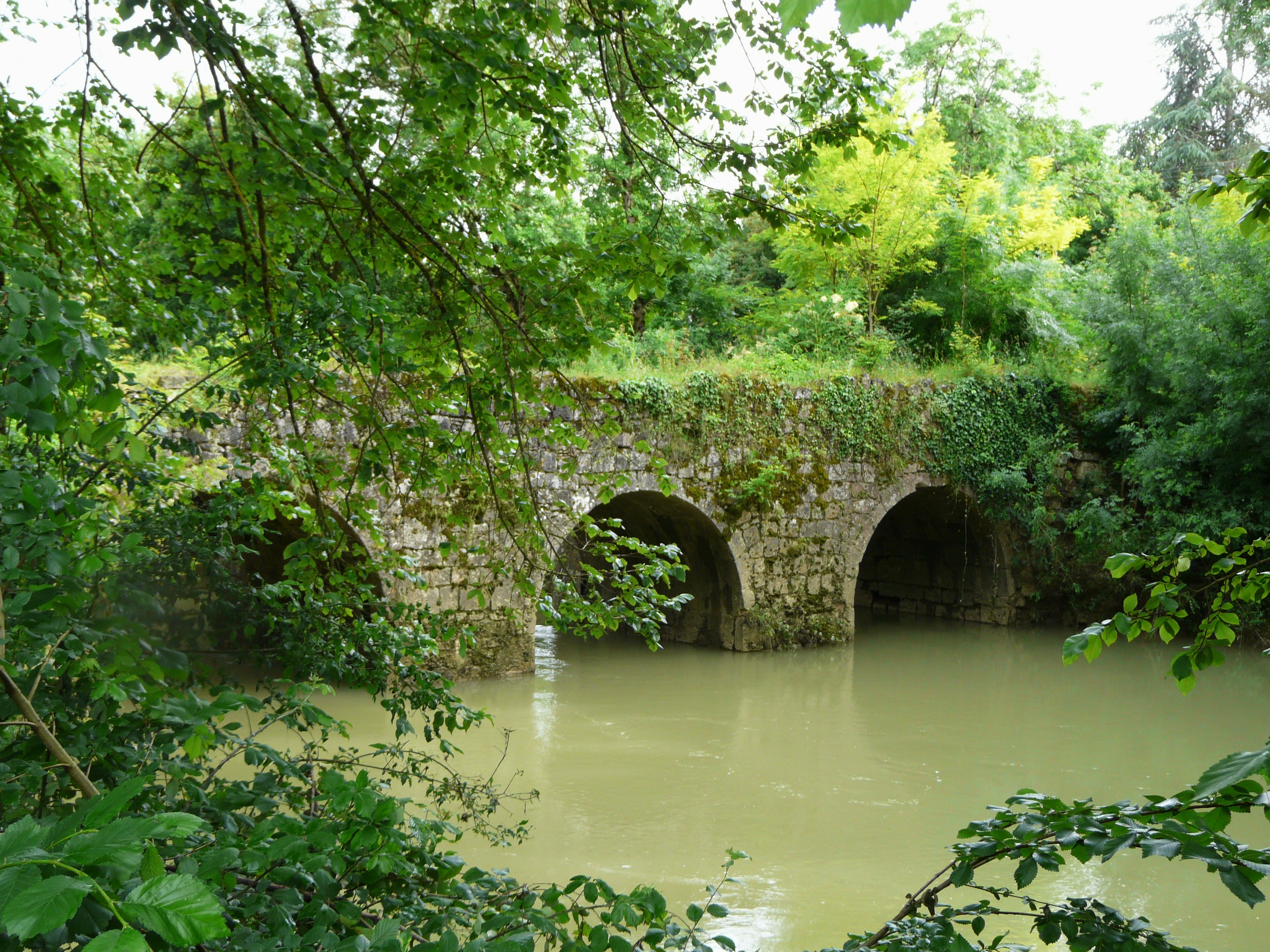

- Location within France Location within Nouvelle-Aquitaine

Location
- Country: France

Physical characteristics
- Source
  - location: Plateau de Lannemezan
  - coordinates: 43°20′18″N 00°19′37″E
  - elevation: 350 m (1,150 ft)
- Mouth
  - location: Gélise
  - coordinates: 44°07′15″N 00°16′49″E
  - elevation: 42 m (138 ft)
- Length: 120.3 km (74.8 mi)
- Basin size: 600 km^{2} (230 sq mi)
- Discharge
  - average: 2.62 m^{3}/s (93 cu ft/s)

Basin features
- Progression: Gélise→ Baïse→ Garonne→ Gironde estuary→ Atlantic Ocean

The Osse (French pronunciation: [ɔs]) is a 120 km (75 mi) long river in southwestern France, right tributary of the river Gélise. Its source is in the Hautes-Pyrénées, 2 km (1.2 mi) southeast of the village Bernadets-Debat, in the Plateau de Lannemezan. It joins the river Gélise 5 km (3.1 mi) southwest of the town Nérac.

Its course crosses the following départements and communes:

- Hautes-Pyrénées: Bernadets-Debat
- Gers: Montesquiou, Saint-Arailles, Vic-Fezensac, Mouchan
- Lot-et-Garonne: Fréchou, Moncrabeau, Lannes
