= Bernadets-Debat =

- Commune
- Coat of arms
- Location of Bernadets-Debat
- Location within France Location within Occitanie
- Coordinates: 43°21′17″N 0°19′05″E
- Country: France
- Region: Occitania
- Department: Hautes-Pyrénées
- Arrondissement: Tarbes
- Canton: Les Coteaux
- Intercommunality: Pays de Trie et Magnoac

Government
  - Mayor (2020–2026): Jean-Louis Mailhes
- Area^{1}: 8.77 km^{2} (3.39 sq mi)
- Elevation: 330 m (1,080 ft)
- Highest elevation: 386 m (1,266 ft)
- Lowest elevation: 231 m (758 ft)
- Population (2023): 98
  - Density: 11/km^{2} (29/sq mi)
- Time zone: UTC+01:00 (CET)
  - Summer (DST): UTC+02:00 (CEST)
- INSEE/Postal code: 65085 /65220
- ^{1} French Land Register data, which excludes lakes, ponds, glaciers > 1 km^{2} (0.386 sq mi or 247 acres) and river estuaries.

Bernadets-Debat (French pronunciation: [bɛʁnadɛ dəba]; Occitan: Vernadèth Devath) is a commune in the Hautes-Pyrénées department in southwestern France.

== Population ==
Historical population
Year	Pop.	±% p.a.
1968	138	—
1975	112	−2.94%
1982	107	−0.65%
1990	107	+0.00%
1999	108	+0.10%
2007	107	−0.12%
2012	103	−0.76%
2017	112	+1.69%
2023	98	−2.20%
Source: INSEE

== See also ==
- Communes of the Hautes-Pyrénées department
