= Saint-Pé-Saint-Simon =

- Commune
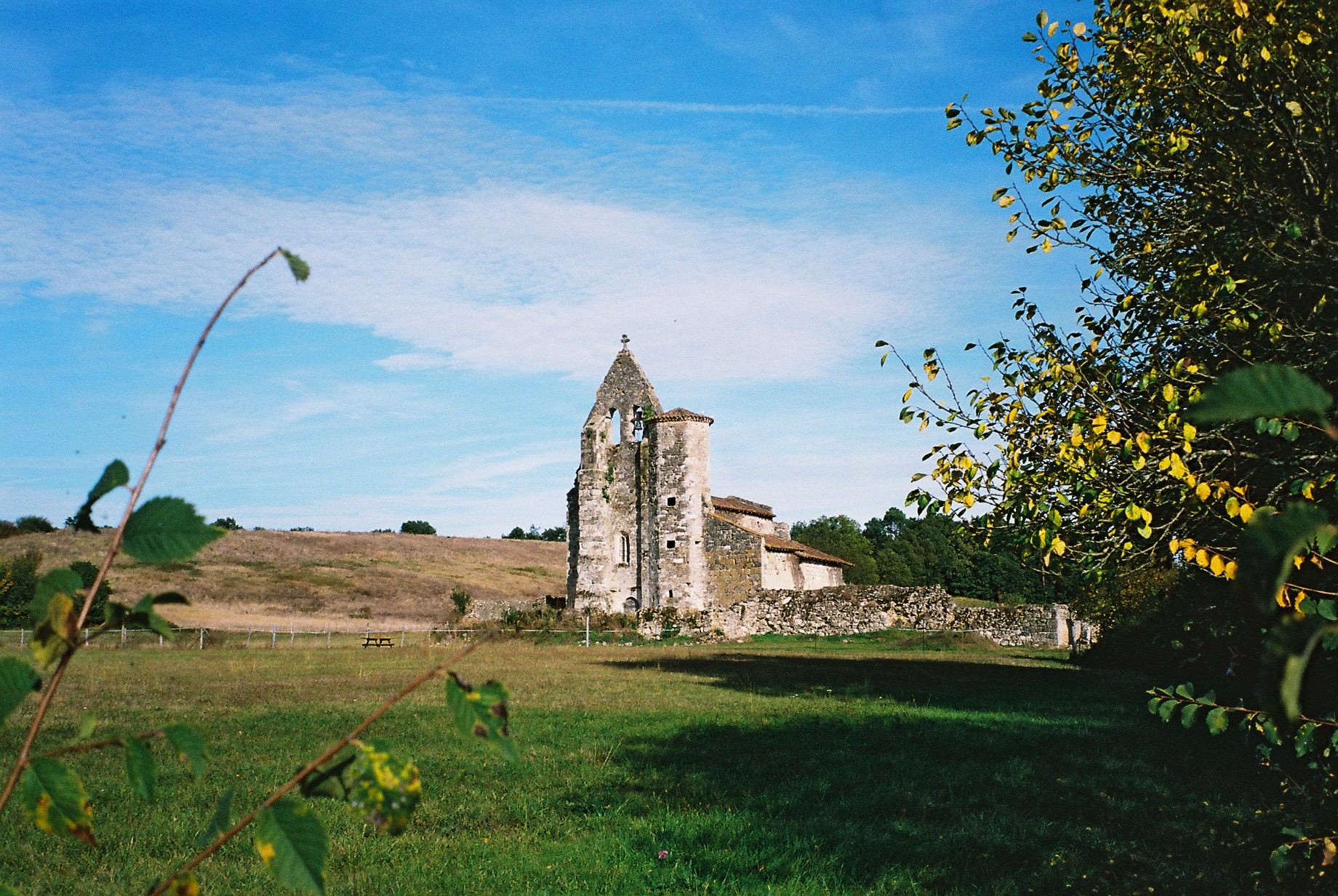
- The church in Saint-Pé-Saint-Simon
- Location of Saint-Pé-Saint-Simon
- Location within France Location within Nouvelle-Aquitaine
- Coordinates: 44°00′13″N 0°06′09″E
- Country: France
- Region: Nouvelle-Aquitaine
- Department: Lot-et-Garonne
- Arrondissement: Nérac
- Canton: L'Albret

Government
  - Mayor (2020–2026): Michel Sabathier
- Area^{1}: 17.46 km^{2} (6.74 sq mi)
- Elevation: 120 m (390 ft)
- Highest elevation: 161 m (528 ft)
- Lowest elevation: 73 m (240 ft)
- Population (2023): 182
  - Density: 10.4/km^{2} (27.0/sq mi)
- Time zone: UTC+01:00 (CET)
  - Summer (DST): UTC+02:00 (CEST)
- INSEE/Postal code: 47266 /47170
- ^{1} French Land Register data, which excludes lakes, ponds, glaciers > 1 km^{2} (0.386 sq mi or 247 acres) and river estuaries.

Saint-Pé-Saint-Simon (French pronunciation: [sɛ̃ pe sɛ̃ simɔ̃]; Gascon: Sent Pèr e Sent Simon) is a commune in the Lot-et-Garonne department in south-western France.

== See also ==
- Communes of the Lot-et-Garonne department
