= Lupiac =

- Commune
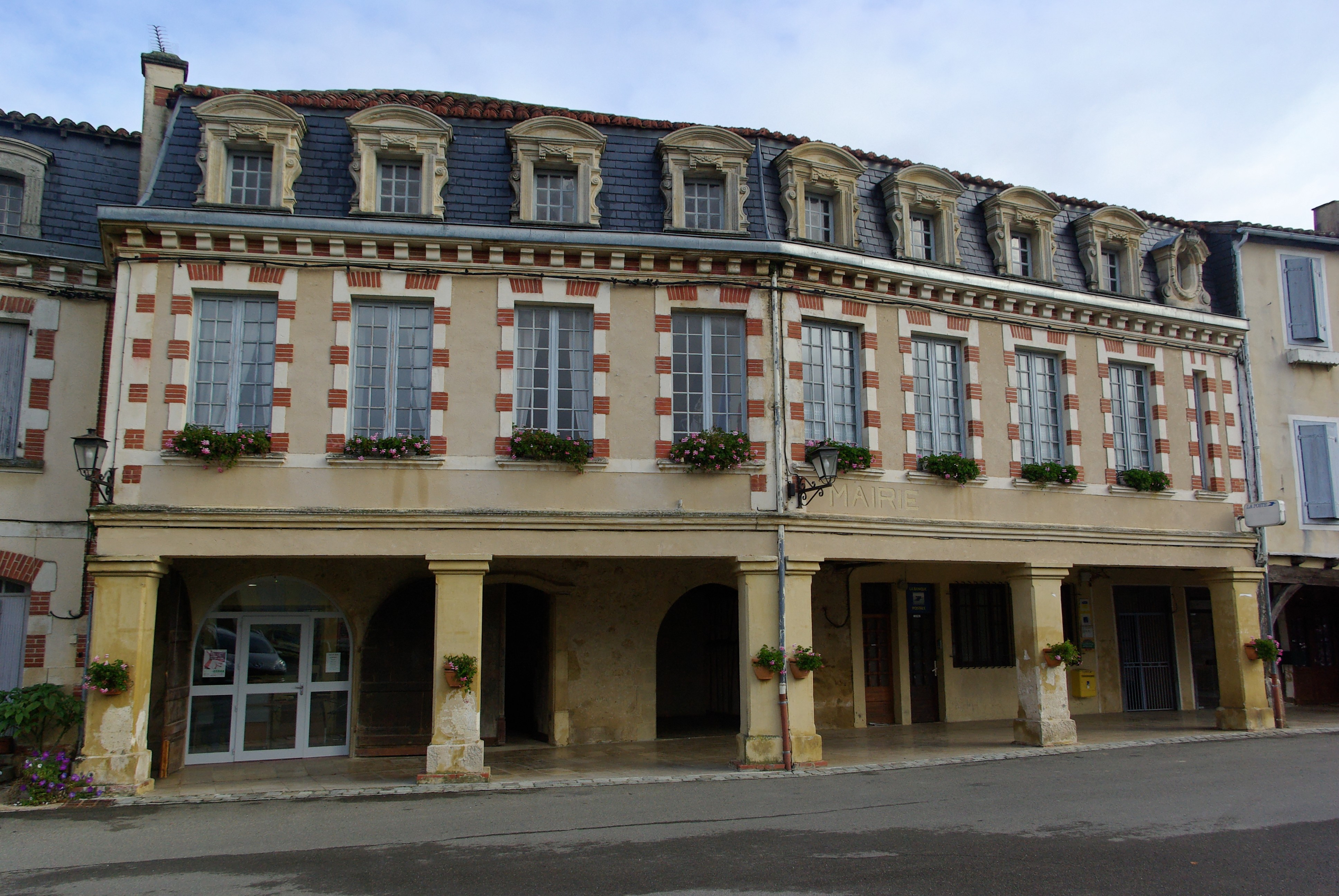
- The town hall in Lupiac
- Location of Lupiac
- Location within France Location within Occitanie
- Coordinates: 43°41′N 0°11′E
- Country: France
- Region: Occitania
- Department: Gers
- Arrondissement: Auch
- Canton: Fezensac
- Intercommunality: Artagnan en Fézensac

Government
  - Mayor (2020–2026): Véronique Thieux Louit
- Area^{1}: 34.5 km^{2} (13.3 sq mi)
- Elevation: 248 m (814 ft)
- Highest elevation: 247 m (810 ft)
- Lowest elevation: 141 m (463 ft)
- Population (2023): 310
  - Density: 9.0/km^{2} (23/sq mi)
- Time zone: UTC+01:00 (CET)
  - Summer (DST): UTC+02:00 (CEST)
- INSEE/Postal code: 32219 /32290
- ^{1} French Land Register data, which excludes lakes, ponds, glaciers > 1 km^{2} (0.386 sq mi or 247 acres) and river estuaries.

Lupiac (French pronunciation: [lypjak]) is a commune in the Gers department in southwestern France.

== Geography ==
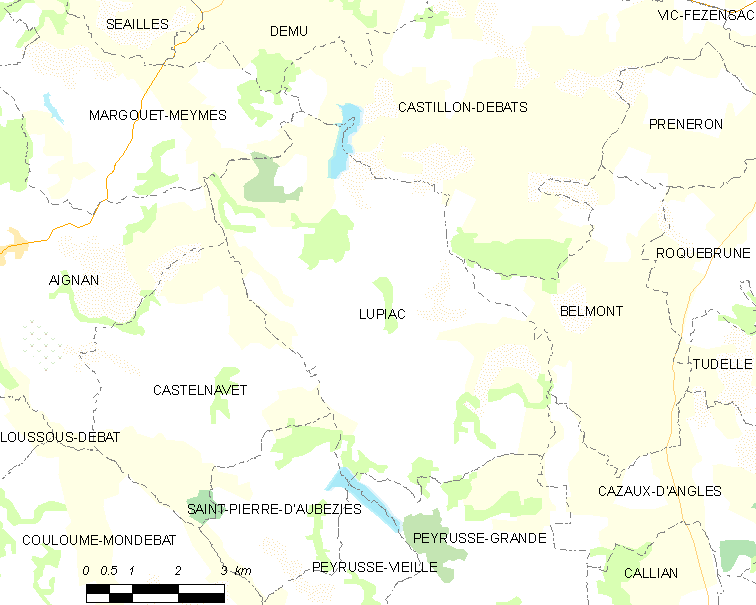
Lupiac and its surrounding communes

The Auzoue forms most of the commune's southeastern border. The Douze forms the commune's western border.

== Population ==
Historical population
Year	Pop.	±% p.a.
1968	505	—
1975	433	−2.17%
1982	400	−1.13%
1990	356	−1.45%
1999	312	−1.46%
2007	310	−0.08%
2012	302	−0.52%
2017	300	−0.13%
2023	310	+0.55%
Source: INSEE

== Literature ==
Charles de Batz de Castelmore d'Artagnan (c. 1611 – 25 June 1673), a captain of the Musketeers of the Guard, was born here. A fictionalized version of his life is central to The Three Musketeers by Alexandre Dumas, père. Lupiac has a museum dedicated to him.

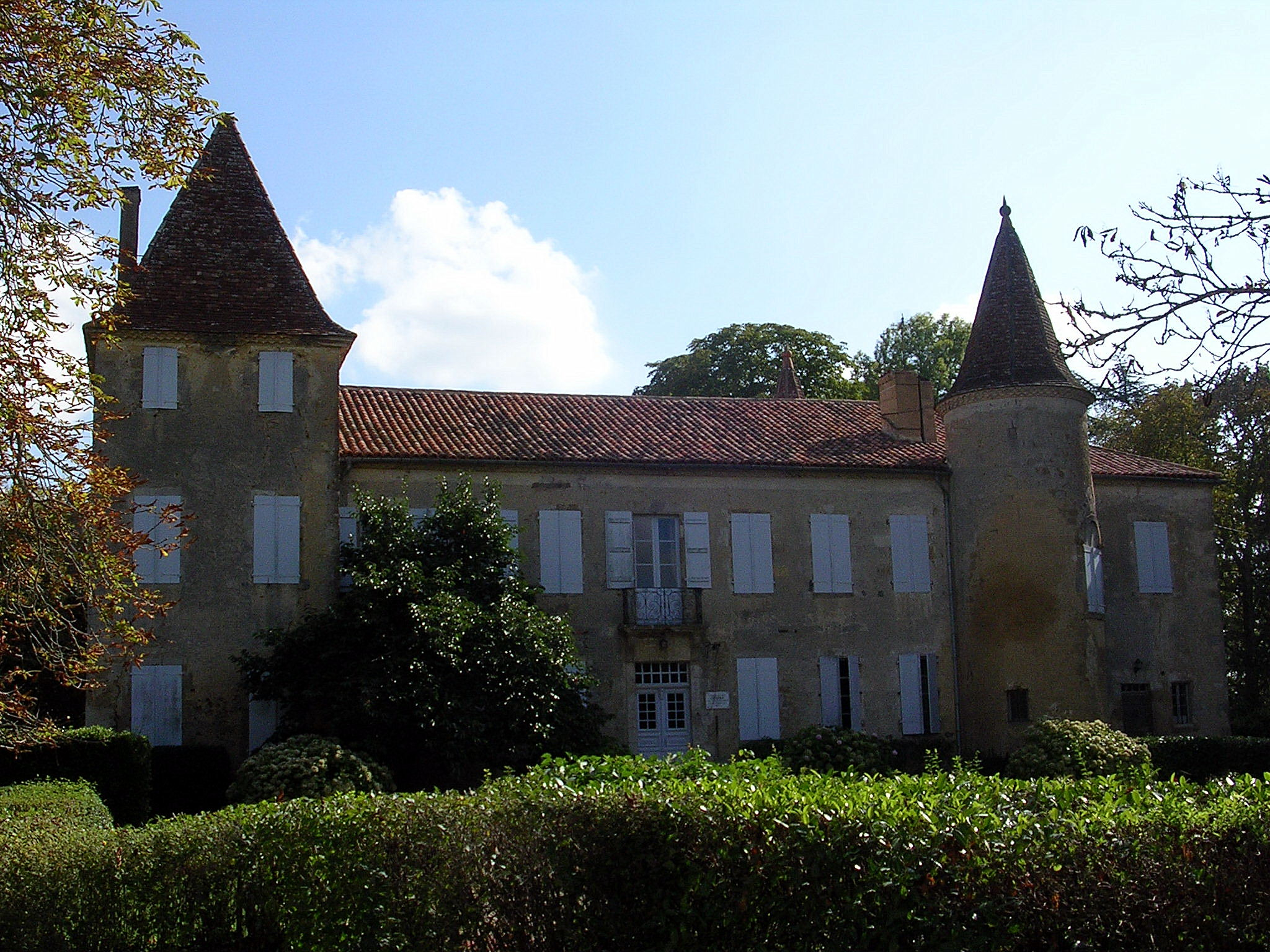
Castle of d'Artagnan

== See also ==
- Communes of the Gers department
