= Dému =

- Commune
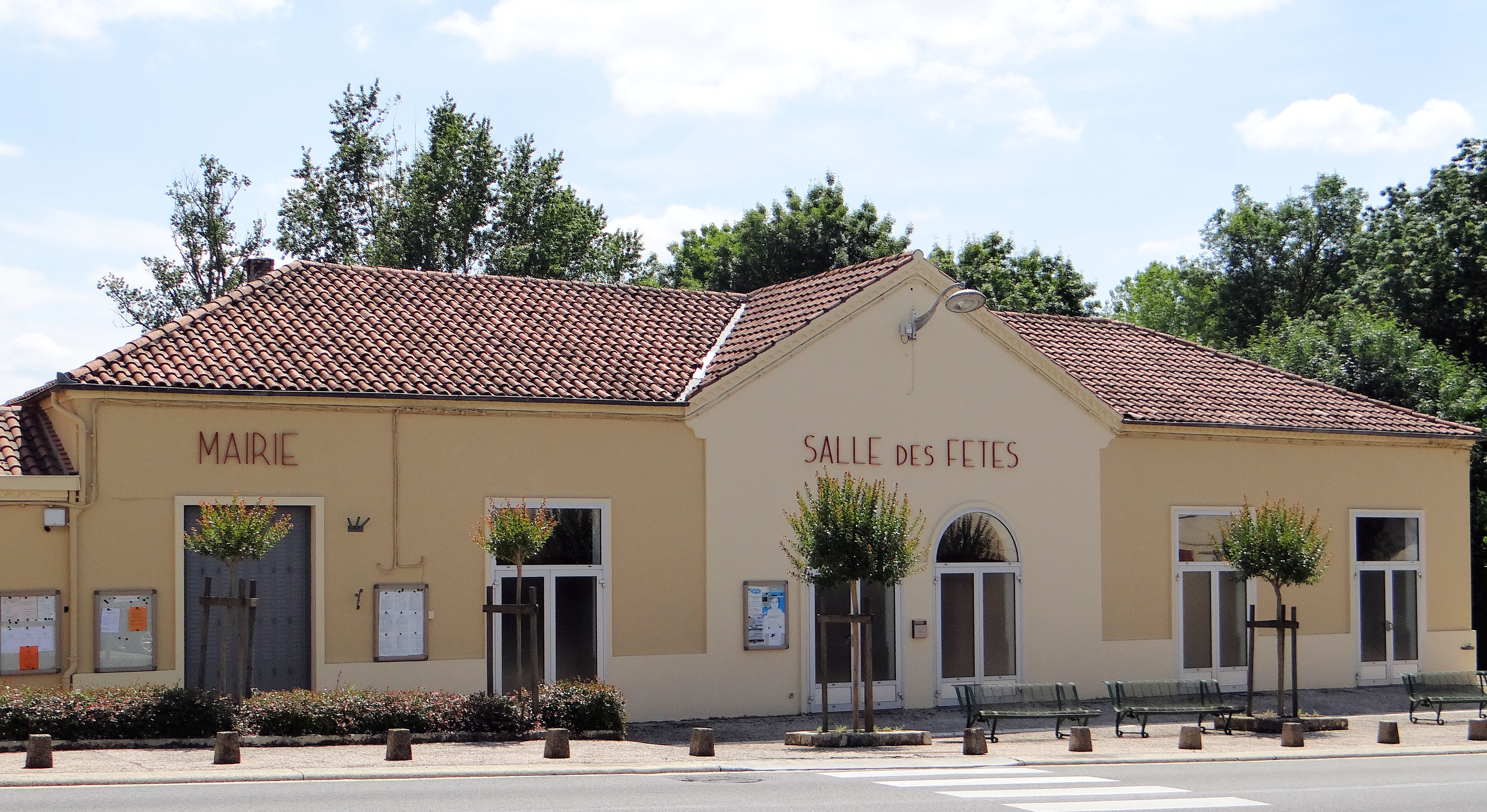
- Town hall

- Coat of arms
- Location of Dému
- Location within France Location within Occitanie
- Coordinates: 43°45′59″N 0°10′02″E
- Country: France
- Region: Occitania
- Department: Gers
- Arrondissement: Condom
- Canton: Fezensac
- Intercommunality: Grand Armagnac

Government
  - Mayor (2020–2026): Thierry Frenot
- Area^{1}: 28.89 km^{2} (11.15 sq mi)
- Elevation: 171 m (561 ft)
- Highest elevation: 232 m (761 ft)
- Lowest elevation: 137 m (449 ft)
- Population (2023): 317
  - Density: 11.0/km^{2} (28.4/sq mi)
- Time zone: UTC+01:00 (CET)
  - Summer (DST): UTC+02:00 (CEST)
- INSEE/Postal code: 32115 /32190
- ^{1} French Land Register data, which excludes lakes, ponds, glaciers > 1 km^{2} (0.386 sq mi or 247 acres) and river estuaries.

Dému (French pronunciation: [demy]; Occitan: Demú) is a commune in the Gers department in southwestern France.

== Geography ==
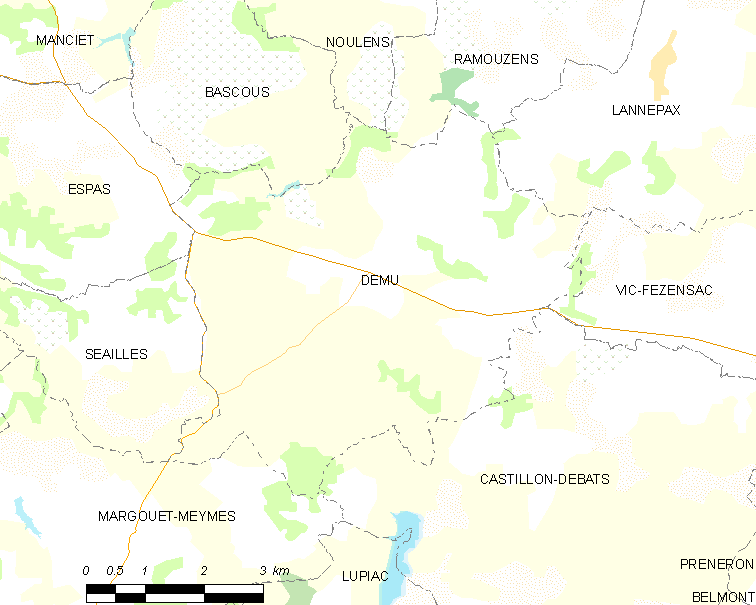
Dému and its surrounding communes

== Population ==
Historical population
Year	Pop.	±% p.a.
1968	403	—
1975	372	−1.14%
1982	314	−2.39%
1990	325	+0.43%
1999	339	+0.47%
2007	338	−0.04%
2012	333	−0.30%
2017	337	+0.24%
2023	317	−1.01%
Source: INSEE

== Literature ==
Dému features as a main setting in the Michael Ondaatje novel Divisadero.

== See also ==
- Communes of the Gers department
