= Laborie (disambiguation) =

Laborie is a village in Saint Lucia. Laborie may also refer to:

- Laborie District, district in Saint Lucia
- Laborie, American company
- Christophe Laborie (born 1986), French cyclist
- Jean Laborie (1919–1996), French bishop
- Pierre Laborie (1936–2017), French historian
