= Château de Béduer =

13th-century French castle

- Part of Béduer, France
- Lot
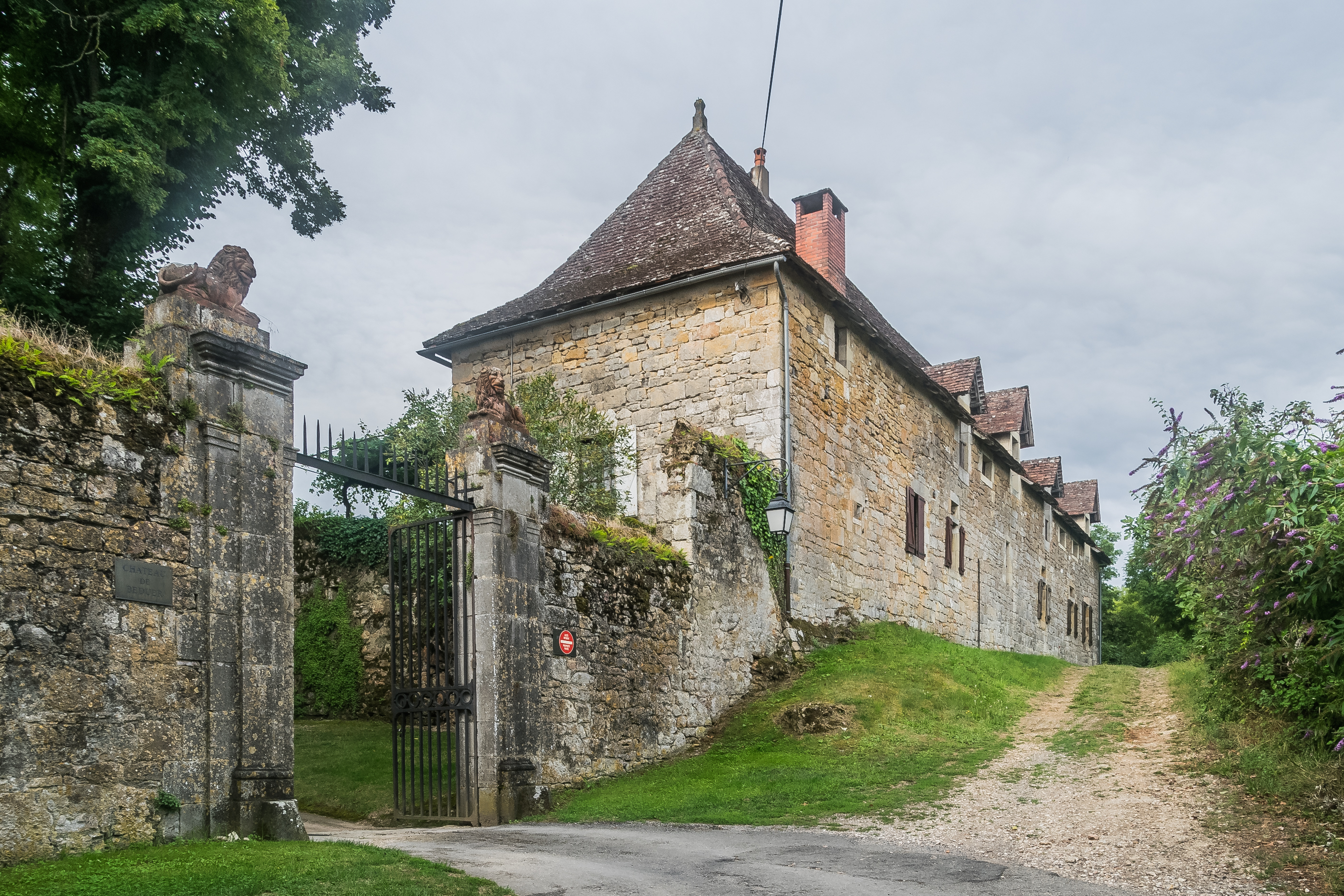

Site information
- Type: Castle
- Owner: Camp Chateau
- Open to the public: Yes
- Condition: Excellent condition

Location
- Location within France
- Coordinates: 44°34′48″N 1°57′09″E

Site history
- Built: 1098
- Built by: Deodat de Barasc
- In use: 13th Century- 1985
- Materials: Stone
- Events: Hundred Years' War; Albigensian Crusade

Monument historique
- Official name: Château de Béduer
- Type: Classé
- Designated: 1973
- Reference no.: PA00094981

The Château de Béduer is a 13th-century feudal castle in the commune of Béduer in the Lot département of France. The castle and its dependencies dominate the village of Béduer and overlook the valley of the River Célé. The buildings show evidence of construction from the 13th to 17th centuries with both Romanesque and 17th-century architecture. It is set in grounds of 40 acres and has been classified as a historic monument since 1973. The castle is privately owned and often used for private events.

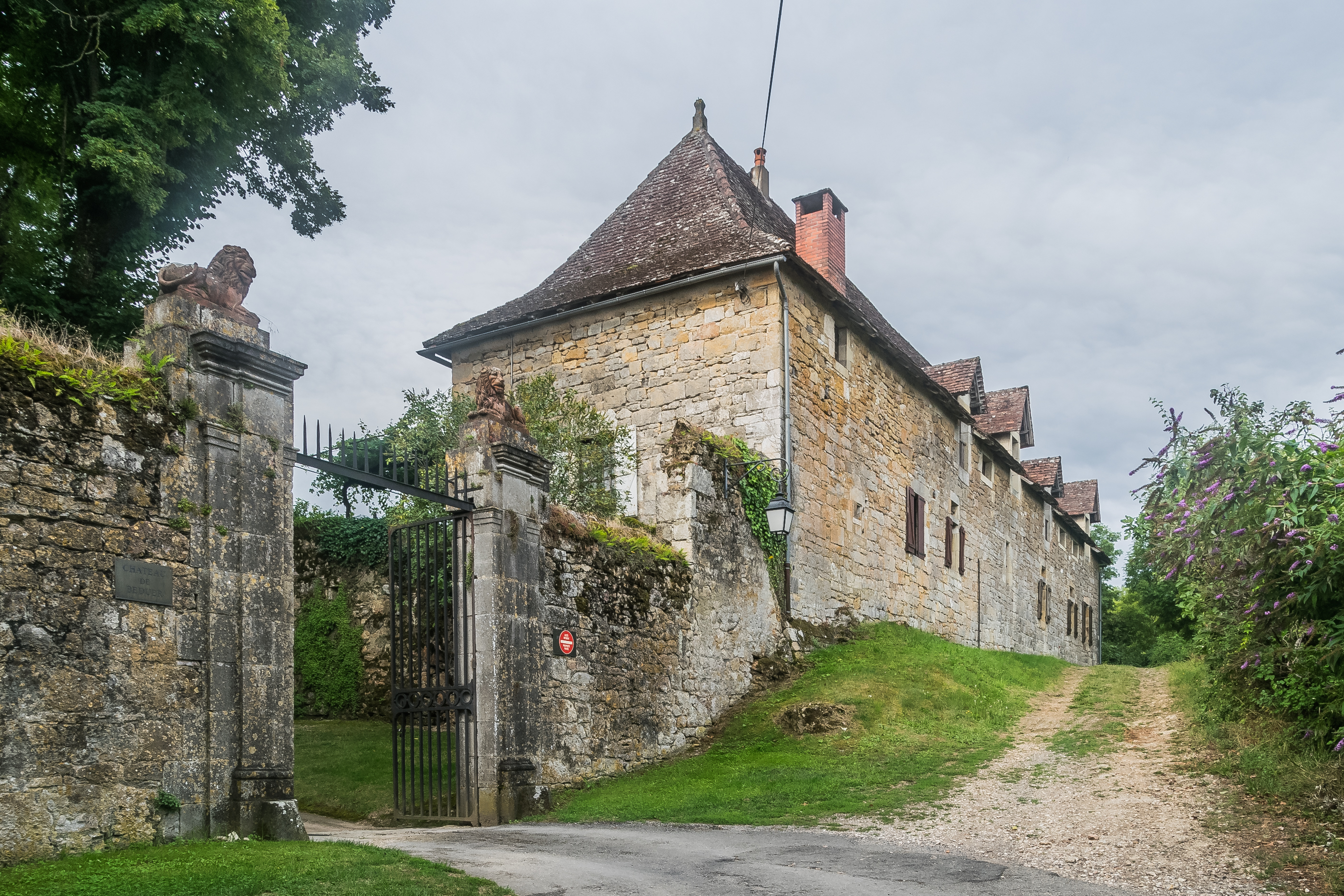
Castle of Beduer

== Architecture ==
The château buildings date back to the 13th century, although earlier foundations have been found below the 13th-century construction. Of the medieval castle, little more than the general outline remains: a "U" shape, open to the north. There was a fourth side to the square, possibly stables, which seems to have been demolished in the 18th century.

The keep, the oldest part of the building, dates back to 1204. It is a 25-metre-high rectangular tower, originally taller, losing its top floor after the Revolution. On an eight-metre-square base, its walls are two metres thick and give it an internal floor area of only four metres square.

To the north of the keep are the remains of the chapel, of which only the lower floors remain. The upper floor was demolished and replaced by a terrace during the Second World War.

To the east of the courtyard is the main building with its two-metre-thick outer walls demonstrating its medieval origins. Inside, La Grande Salle, two storeys in height, has a gallery running along two sides at first-floor level. The hall is notable for its 15th-century chimney (the upper part restored in the 19th century) and for its 17th-century painted ceiling. Two stone shields set into the chimney breast commemorate the marriage of Dordé de Béduer to Jeanne de Balzac of Montal in 1457. The hall is dominated by a huge 19th-century Venetian chandelier.

The front of the building has a beautiful embossed entrance (the shields at the top are 19th-century) showing the slots which formerly carried the chains to let down the drawbridge over a dry moat. The façade was classified as a monument historique in 1973.

Inside, the castle boasts three beautifully furnished main rooms plus the Grande Salle, a large, modern kitchen and first-floor kitchenette, several smaller private rooms together with nine bedrooms and seven bathrooms.

The château sits within a walled, partly wooded park with rose gardens, fruit trees and a large swimming pool tucked neatly out of sight of the château and is surrounded by its own 14 hectares (35 acres) of meadow land, where in the spring and summer sheep may safely graze.

== History ==
The first authentic record of Béduer appears in the 11th century when a bull of Pope Urban II named the seigneur of Béduer as a defender of the Abbey of Figeac. The first seigneur of whose name we know was Deodat Barasc. He had usurped two churches belonging to the Abbey of Marcillac but on departing for the Holy Land left a will giving the churches back to the abbey, an obligation that, in the event, his sons simply ignored.

=== The Barascs ===
The Barascs of Béduer were a significant fighting family, defending their rights against more powerful neighbours while intimidating their weaker ones. They parlayed successfully to retain their lands and eleven châteaux during the Albigensian Crusade before changing sides to defend the County of Toulouse against the French king. In 1277, they offered the people of Béduer one of the earliest charters in France to loosen the hold of the feudal system.

The Barascs made their mark during the Hundred Years' War against the English, leading successful campaigns against the garrison at Saint-Cirq-Lapopie and successfully defending Cahors against Edward, the Black Prince. On three occasions the Estates General of Quercy met in the Grande Salle of the château.

As loyal Catholics, the Barascs defended their château against the Protestants in the Wars of Religion in the 16th century until the death of the last of their line, Deodat VIII in 1559.

The Barascs had chosen an excellent site for their castle. Built on a rocky outcrop overlooking the valley of the River Célé with high walls on three sides and a dry moat on the other, it was easily defended, and has a commanding view of all who passed along the valley: from the pilgrims and war parties of the Middle Ages, to the tourists and commuters of today.

The earliest entrance to the castle was below what became the chapel which dates, like the main tower, from the 13th century. The main buildings across the courtyard however date from the 15th and 17th centuries.

=== The Lostanges ===
It was the Lostange family who had acquired the château in 1604 that converted the castle from a château-fort to a country home suitable for a noble family. The painted ceiling in the Grande Salle dates from the early 17th century as does the kitchen on the ground floor below the second tower, rebuilt during the same period. The entrance porch bears the coat of arms of the Lostanges.

The Lostanges were a military family and after the acquisition of Béduer the Seigneur, Jean-Louis de Lostange was elevated to Viscount. His grandson became the Seneschal of Quercy, the king's representative in 1775 and at a time of growing unrest in the country in 1786, called a meeting of the Estates General of Quercy in Cahors in an attempt to introduce concessions. But it was too late.

The French Revolution caused few ripples in Béduer. A fairly liberal gentleman, the Marquis de Lostanges was well enough liked by the local peasantry that he managed to retain his château, his title and his head at the revolution. His cousin became the first mayor of Figeac once the dust had settled. The only casualty of the revolution was the château tower, which following an edict to demolish any structure that could be used by counter-revolutionaries, was decapitated in about 1790.

By the early 19th century the Lostanges were spending very little time at Béduer and in 1874 they sold or let the château to a religious order from Villefranche-de-Rouergue. The nuns opened a school for the village children in the crypt but they finally went bankrupt, the château reverted to the Lostanges, and was finally sold to Colrat de Montrozier in 1886. He had married a young lady from Figeac who wanted to be near her family.

Colrat was deeply traditional and conservative, dismayed by the radical attitudes he found in the Lot. Every morning he would ride to Faycelles to gaze across the river to his beloved Aveyron with its respectful, God-fearing Catholic population. Colrat had three children. His elder daughter married a young man from Nantes in 1886, who brought his best friend, Maurice Fenaille to Béduer as his best man. Fenaille fell in love with the region, with Béduer, and with the younger daughter Eugénie whom he married the following year.

=== Maurice Fenaille ===
Maurice Fenaille had made his fortune in the oil industry. An art lover, collector and philanthropist, he used his wealth to great effect.

The départements of the Lot and Aveyron had remained primarily agricultural and by the second half of the 19th century, agricultural depression led to rural depopulation and a drift to the industrial cities. The population of Béduer fell from 1500 to just 500 between 1850 and 1950, the decline accelerated by the two world wars which cost the lives of many of its young men.

Worried by the poverty and rural depopulation, Fenaille set up a textile factory and an agricultural college in Aveyron and founded the museum in Rodez that bears his name. He discovered and restored to its former glory the Renaissance Château de Montal near Saint-Céré, travelling the world buying and bringing back its lost stonework. In 1908, he reached an agreement with The Louvre that they would return the ornamental stonework they had acquired from Montal on condition that ownership of the château be ceded to the French state. Fenaille agreed but with the proviso that he and his children has the right to live there for the rest of their lives. In the event the French state had a long wait. His daughter Antoinette only handed Montal over to the State on her 102nd birthday in 2008.

Maurice Fenaille acquired the Château de Béduer from his father-in-law in 1911 and set about restoring the interior. He reopened the Grande Salle which had been converted into small rooms by the nuns, rebuilt the medieval fireplace and rediscovered the early 17th century painted ceiling. He found period furniture in Italy and France and acquired the Aubusson tapestries which still add so much to the charm of the château. Structurally, he rebuilt a section of the roof, lowering it to below the height of the tower, and installed electric lighting – one of the first private homes in the Lot to be so equipped.

=== Jeanne Loviton ===
When Maurice Fenaiile died in 1937, his widow sold Béduer to a young “femme de letters”, the lawyer, writer and publisher Jeanne Loviton, better known by her pen name as Jean Voilier. Jeanne had been looking for "a small place in the country". But she experienced a "coup de foudre" when she first saw the château by moonlight and the deal was done.

Loviton was one of the most remarkable women of her age. Divorced from her playwright husband Pierre Frendaie in 1936 and an independent spirit, she cut a swathe through literary France between the wars, counting among her lovers such literary giants as Jean Giraudoux, Saint-John Perse, and others including ambassadors, government ministers and the feminist, Yvonne Dornes. But the greatest of all her lovers was Paul Valéry. Jeanne became his muse, his Egeria and the love of the great poet's life. During their affair which lasted from 1937 until just before the poet's death in 1945, he wrote Jeanne more than 150 love poems and more than 1,000 love letters (which finally saw the light of day in 2014). According to a friend of this writer who knew her well, her greatest assets were her eyes "which focussed on you, and her smile which told you you were the only man in creation".

Loviton ended their relationship in May 1945 when she wrote to Valéry telling him that she was now living with someone else. His health declined rapidly and he died three months later. Valéry's widow told her daughter-in-law. "I didn't know that a man could die of a broken heart."

Loviton's lover from 1943 had been the collaborationist publisher Robert Denoël. Denoël was shot dead in a Paris street in December 1945 but the assassin was never caught. His wife Cecile directly accused Jeanne of complicity in the murder and the theft of his business Editions Denoel. Loviton, however, gained most from Denoël's death. Shortly before his death Denoël had signed over his shares in his publishing house to a "straw man" Yvonne Dornes to protect them from the risk of loss in view of a number of legal threats against him for collaboration during the war. But after five years of lawsuits in which Jeanne was ultimately successful in clearing her name, Loviton sold the company to its rival Éditions Gallimard for a substantial profit. She also gained the entire contents of the apartment where she and Denoël had lived together. Celine Denoël sued her for the return of her jewelry, other personal possessions and the library of 3,000 books from what had formerly been in the Denoëls' matrimonial home but it speaks highly of Loviton's skills as a lawyer that Celine eventually lost the case.

Loviton spent many happy holidays at Béduer and made many improvements including installing toilets inside the thickness of the massive exterior walls. During the war she rented part of the château to the Jewish banking family David-Weill. Two of the boys were taught Latin by the village priest, a Vichy sympathiser.

At the instigation of her lifelong friend and lover Yvonne Dornes, from 1941 until the end of the war the chateau hid the film archives of the Cinematheque Francaise where the German Jewish exile Lotte Eisner spent three months cataloguing the films. Other guests during the war included Prince Pierre de Monaco and Fernand de Brinon, number three in the Vichy hierarchy who was executed in 1947. After the war the guests included British fascist leader Oswald Mosley and the Japanese Ambassador. In summer 1943 she invited a number of lovers for a week at a time including Robert Denoël, followed two weeks later by Paul Valéry. A diarist wrote: "She was keen for all her friends to share the joys of her beloved château".

When this writer's father-in-law aged 72 visited the château in 1984, he spent half an hour with Jeanne Loviton and emerged from the encounter 'with stars in his eyes'. She was by then 80 and had clearly lost none of her charm. It was her friend Julian Pitt-Rivers who said of her: "She was the last of the 'grandes horizontales'; she had God's greatest gift to women: she could give an old man an erection."

Loviton sold the château to a private party in 1985. She died in Paris in 1996, aged 93.

== The château today ==
Between 1985 and 2002, the château was privately owned but hosted summer concerts for the community and, with its three attendant holiday houses, was available to rent for weddings, family occasions, seminars and corporate and artistic events.

In 2002, the château was sold to Philippa Girling, Lynda Coleman, and Leah Lykins. They crowd-funded money to renovate the château and operate it as Camp Château, an all-inclusive women's summer camp. After an inaugural summer season in 2023 during which 240 campers attended the 6-day, 5-night camp sessions, the camp became extremely popular. This was fueled by social media videos of happy guests engaging in electives like jam making and kayaking, and enjoying communal al fresco lunches served from picnic hampers. Camp sessions sold out, and a long waiting list for spots grew. The wait list peaked at 13,000 hopeful campers in 2024, and Camp Château's management responded by expanding the number of weeks available, accommodating about 1,850 participants in 2026 and expecting more than 2,100 in 2027. Camp Château supports the surrounding community by hiring locals to lead elective classes at the château, provide artistic entertainment, and staff its summer camp program. Château guests also take trips to the Figeac weekend market, where they are able to support local merchants.

== Annex: The Béduer Charter ==
Under this charter, granted by the Seigneur to the people of Béduer in 1277, the Seigneur agreed to pay a price acceptable to the owner for anything taken from him; inhabitants were not obliged to follow the seigneur to war (on payment of a fee); violence against women and girls would be punished; whoever holds meadows, woods or land has the right to exploit it for his own benefit and to prevent others from using it; and only the consuls - the representatives of the people - had the right to levy taxes for the upkeep of the commune. The seigneur also agreed that adultery would be punished – although he had the exclusive right to waive any punishment!

See Petitjean for more details.

== See also ==
- List of castles in France
