= Béduer =

- Commune
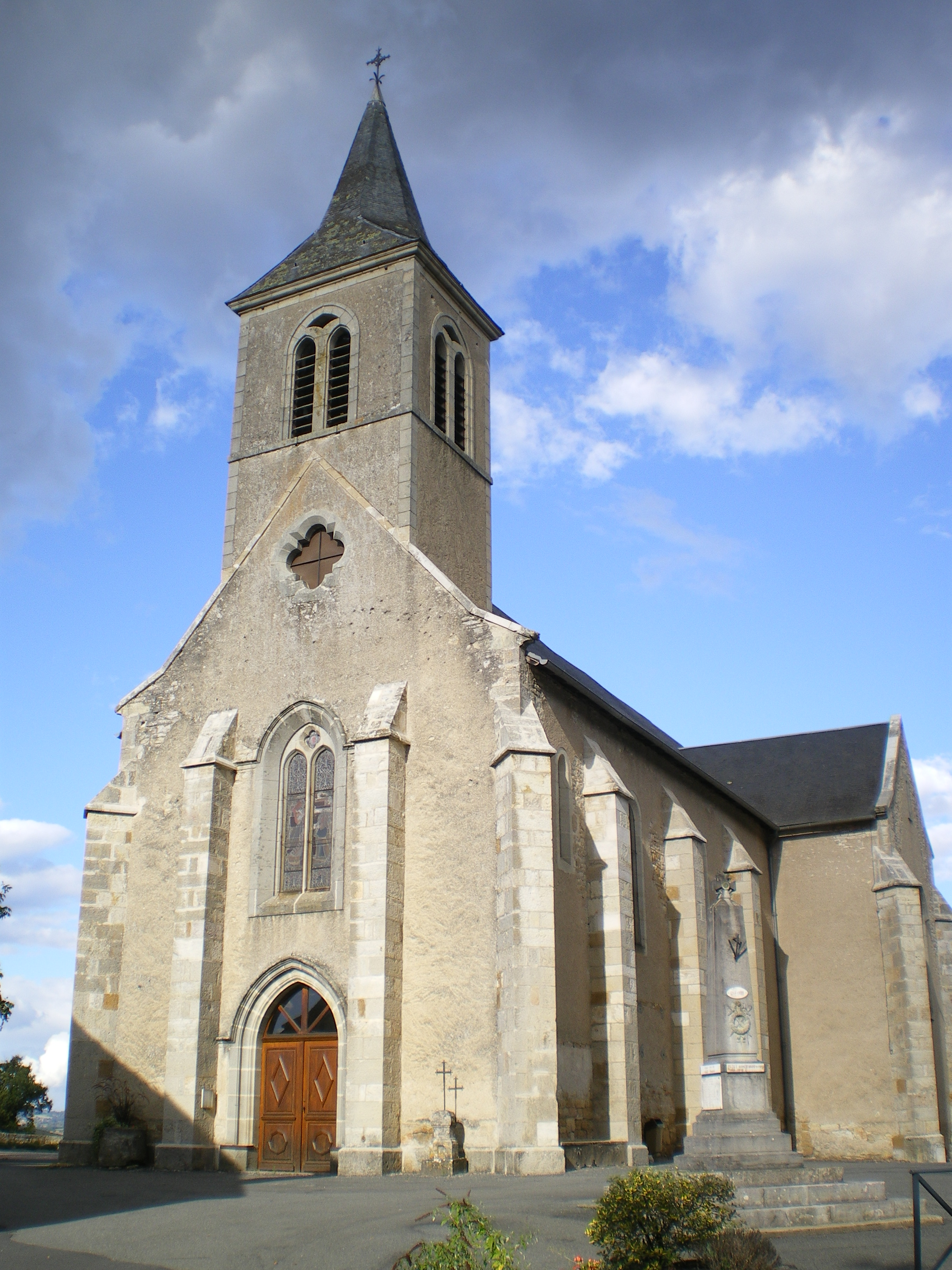
- The church in Béduer
- Location of Béduer
- Location within France Location within Occitanie
- Coordinates: 44°34′54″N 1°57′01″E
- Country: France
- Region: Occitania
- Department: Lot
- Arrondissement: Figeac
- Canton: Figeac-1
- Intercommunality: CC Grand-Figeac

Government
  - Mayor (2020–2026): Benoît Normand
- Area^{1}: 24.78 km^{2} (9.57 sq mi)
- Elevation: 260 m (850 ft)
- Highest elevation: 405 m (1,329 ft)
- Lowest elevation: 176 m (577 ft)
- Population (2023): 749
  - Density: 30.2/km^{2} (78.3/sq mi)
- Time zone: UTC+01:00 (CET)
  - Summer (DST): UTC+02:00 (CEST)
- INSEE/Postal code: 46021 /46100
- ^{1} French Land Register data, which excludes lakes, ponds, glaciers > 1 km^{2} (0.386 sq mi or 247 acres) and river estuaries.

Béduer (Languedocien: Beduèr) is a commune in the Lot department in southwestern France.

== Pilgrimage ==
Béduer is situated on the Via Podiensis route that is followed by those making the pilgrimage to Santiago de Compostela and so receives pilgrims arriving from the town of Figeac.

From Béduer pilgrims continue on either to the Notre-Dame de l'Assomption church at Gréalou, reaching the river Lot at Cajarc, or follow the course of the river Célé to its confluence with the Lot, passing by the convent at Espagnac-Sainte-Eulalie.

== History ==
The town was formerly owned by the Lostanges family. Its control of the land between the Lot and Célé rivers put it on a par with the Abbey at Figeac.

== Population ==
Historical population
Year	Pop.	±% p.a.
1968	426	—
1975	454	+0.91%
1982	516	+1.85%
1990	596	+1.82%
1999	623	+0.49%
2007	720	+1.83%
2012	745	+0.68%
2017	720	−0.68%
2023	749	+0.66%
Source: INSEE

== Sights ==
The Château de Barasc, situated on a ridge dates from the twelfth century and has been successively renovated over the ages. It was home to the Barasc family, one of whom, Gerald V, was Bishop of Cahors between 1237 and 1250.

== Personalities ==
- Henri Descremps (born 1 April 1746 in Béduer; died around 1826 in Paris) was an 18th-century French magician who described his art in a famous book, La Magie blanche dévoilée (1784).
- Augustin Boutaric (born 12 August 1885 in Béduer; died 1949 in Dijon) was noted physician and chemist.

== See also ==
- Communes of the Lot department
