= Bernard d'Espagnat =

French physicist, philosopher and author (1921–2015)

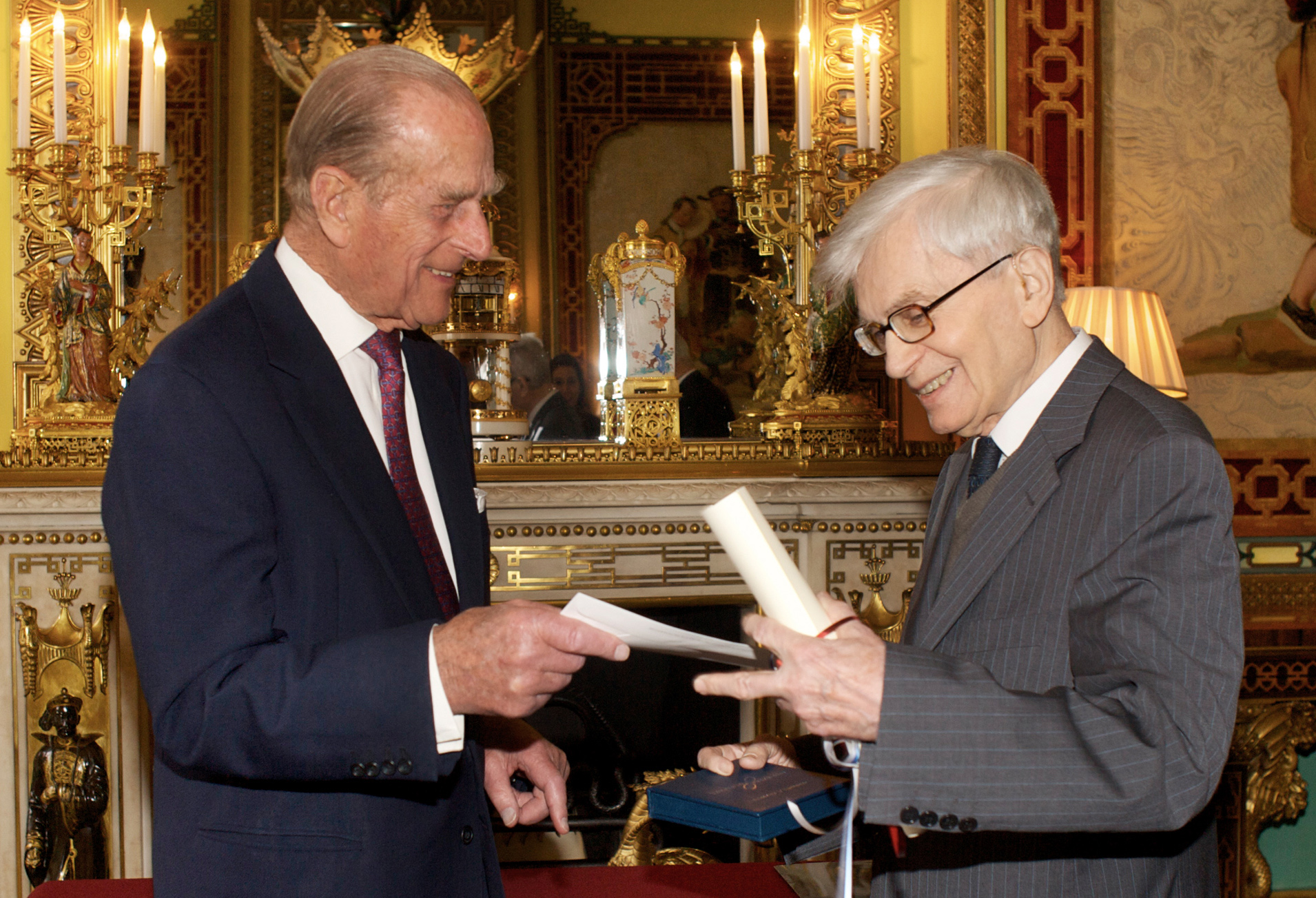
- Bernard d'Espagnat receiving the Templeton Prize from the Duke of Edinburgh, Buckingham Palace in 2009
- Born: 22 August 1921; Fourmagnac, Midi-Pyrénées, France
- Died: 1 August 2015 (aged 93); Paris, France
- Education: Sorbonne
- Awards: Templeton Prize (2009)
- Scientific career
- Fields: Physics
- Workplaces: Sorbonne
- Doctoral advisor: Louis de Broglie
- Doctoral students: Mary K. Gaillard

Bernard d'Espagnat (22 August 1921 – 1 August 2015) was a French theoretical physicist, philosopher of science, and author, best known for his work on the nature of reality in light of quantum mechanics. The Wigner–d'Espagnat inequality is partially named after him.

Quote: "The doctrine that the world is made up of objects whose existence is independent of human consciousness turns out to be in conflict with quantum mechanics and with facts established by experiment."

== Early life and education ==
D'Espagnat was born on 22 August 1921 in Fourmagnac, France, but spent most of his early years in Paris, where his father, the post-Impressionist painter George d'Espagnat, and his mother imbued him with a love of classic literature and the arts. Attending school in Paris, he was drawn to the humanities, especially philosophy. Despite his love of philosophy, d'Espagnat focused on science and mathematics, believing that advances in philosophy would require the knowledge and practice of contemporary science.

In 1939, as d'Espagnat made plans to enter the Ecole Polytechnique, World War II put his education on hold and during the German occupation, he was put into forced labor in Vienna. He obtained his Ph.D. from the Sorbonne at the Institut Henri Poincaré under the guidance of Louis de Broglie.

== Career ==
D'Espagnat was a researcher at the Centre National de Recherche Scientifique CNRS, 1947–1957. During this period he also worked with Enrico Fermi at the University of Chicago in Chicago, 1951–1952, and on a research project led by Niels Bohr at the University of Copenhagen, 1953–1954. He then pursued his scientific career as the first theoretical physicist at the European Organization for Nuclear Research (CERN) in Geneva, 1954-59.

From 1959 until his retirement in 1987, D'Espagnat was a senior lecturer at the Faculty of Sciences at the Sorbonne University. He was director of the Laboratory of Theoretical Physics and Elementary Particles at the University of Paris XI (Orsay), 1980-87. He was a visiting professor at the University of Texas at Austin in 1977, and at the University of California - Santa Barbara in 1984.

He had been a member of the Brussels Académie Internationale de Philosophie des Sciences (AIPS (aka International Academy of Philosophy of Science) since 1975, and of the French Academy of Moral and Political Sciences since 1996. His experiments with Bell's inequalities to further his concept of veiled reality won the attention of the John Templeton Foundation. D'Espagnat became the 2009 Templeton Prize winner in March for his "work which acknowledges that science cannot fully explain 'the nature of being.'"

== Philosophical outlook ==
D'Espagnat remained troubled by the scant attention most physicists paid to the interpretational questions raised by quantum mechanics. His first book, Conceptions of Contemporary Physics (1965), asked these questions and sketched possible resolutions, underscoring his insistence that scientists face the issues raised by their own pursuits.

Subsequently, d'Espagnat was an early interpreter of the deep philosophical significance of experimental research agendas in quantum physics. In his 1979 Scientific American article, "The Quantum Theory and Reality," and best-selling 1979 book, À la recherche du réel, le regard d'un physicien (In Search of Reality, the Outlook of a Physicist), he encouraged physicists and philosophers to think afresh about questions long considered marginal but which today serve as the foundation for new fields of research into the nature of reality.

In Le réel voilé, analyse des concepts quantiques (Veiled Reality, An Analysis of Present-Day Quantum Mechanical Concepts), d'Espagnat coined the term "veiled reality" and explained why significant experiments over the past decade had not restored conventional realism. On Physics and Philosophy (published in France in 2002 as Traité de physique et de philosophie) was hailed as "surely the most complete book to have been written on this subject and one likely to last a long time…" by Roland Omnès. His most recent book is Candide et le physicien (Candide and the Physicist), written with Claude Saliceti and published in 2008, a layperson's guide that answers 50 questions which pinpoint and correct preconceived ideas of contemporary physics and examine the many conceptual and philosophical changes those ideas reveal.

D'Espagnat was a transcendental realist. He argued that transcendental realism offers a new argument for the existence of God.

== Honors and awards ==
- Knight of the Order of Legion of Honour
- Officer of the Ordre des Palmes Académiques

== Personal life and death ==
D'Espagnat married May de Schoutheete de Tervant in 1950, who died in 2012; they had two daughters.

He died on 1 August 2015.

== Selected works ==
=== Books ===
- 1965 - Conceptions de la physique contemporaine; les interprétations de la mécanique quantique et de la mesure. Paris: Hermann.
- 1976 - Conceptual Foundations of Quantum Mechanics, 2nd ed. Addison Wesley.
- 1979 - À la recherche du réel - Le regard d'un physicien. Gauthier-Villars
- 1982 - Un atome de sagesse: Propos d'un physicien sur le réel voilé. Paris: Le Seuil.
- 1983 - In Search of Reality. Springer. Trans. of A la recherche du réel, le regard d'un physicien.
- 1984 - Nonseparability and the Tentative Descriptions of Reality.
- 1989 - Reality and the Physicist :Knowledge, Duration and the Quantum World. Cambridge Univ. Press., 284 pages, by Bernard D'Espagnat;J C Espagnat Bernard D'Whitehouse ISBN 978-0-521-33846-2. Transl. of Une incertaine réalité; le monde quantique, la connaissance et la durée.
- 1990 - Penser la science ou les enjeux du savoir.
- 1990 - Georges d'Espagnat.
- 1993 (with others) - Regards sur la matière des quanta et des choses.
- 1994 - Le Réel voilé, analyse des concepts quantiques. English Transl. (2003), Veiled Reality: An Analysis of Quantum Mechanical Concepts, 2003, Westview Press, Boulder, Colorado, 494 pages. ISBN 978-0-8133-4087-6
- 1997 - Physique et réalité, un débat avec Bernard d'Espagnat. Atlantica Séguier Frontieres. ISBN 978-2-86332-216-1.
- 1998 - Ondine et les feux du savoir. Carnets d'une petite sirène.
- 1999 - Conceptual Foundations of Quantum Mechanics, Westview Press, Second Edition, Paperback · 352 pages, ISBN 978-0-7382-0104-7
- 2006 - On physics and philosophy. Princeton University Press. ISBN 978-0-691-11964-9 Translation of 2002, Traité de physique et de philosophie.
- 2008 - Candide et le physicien (Candide and the Physicist), with Claude Saliceti.
