= Linac, Lot =

Linac
- Commune
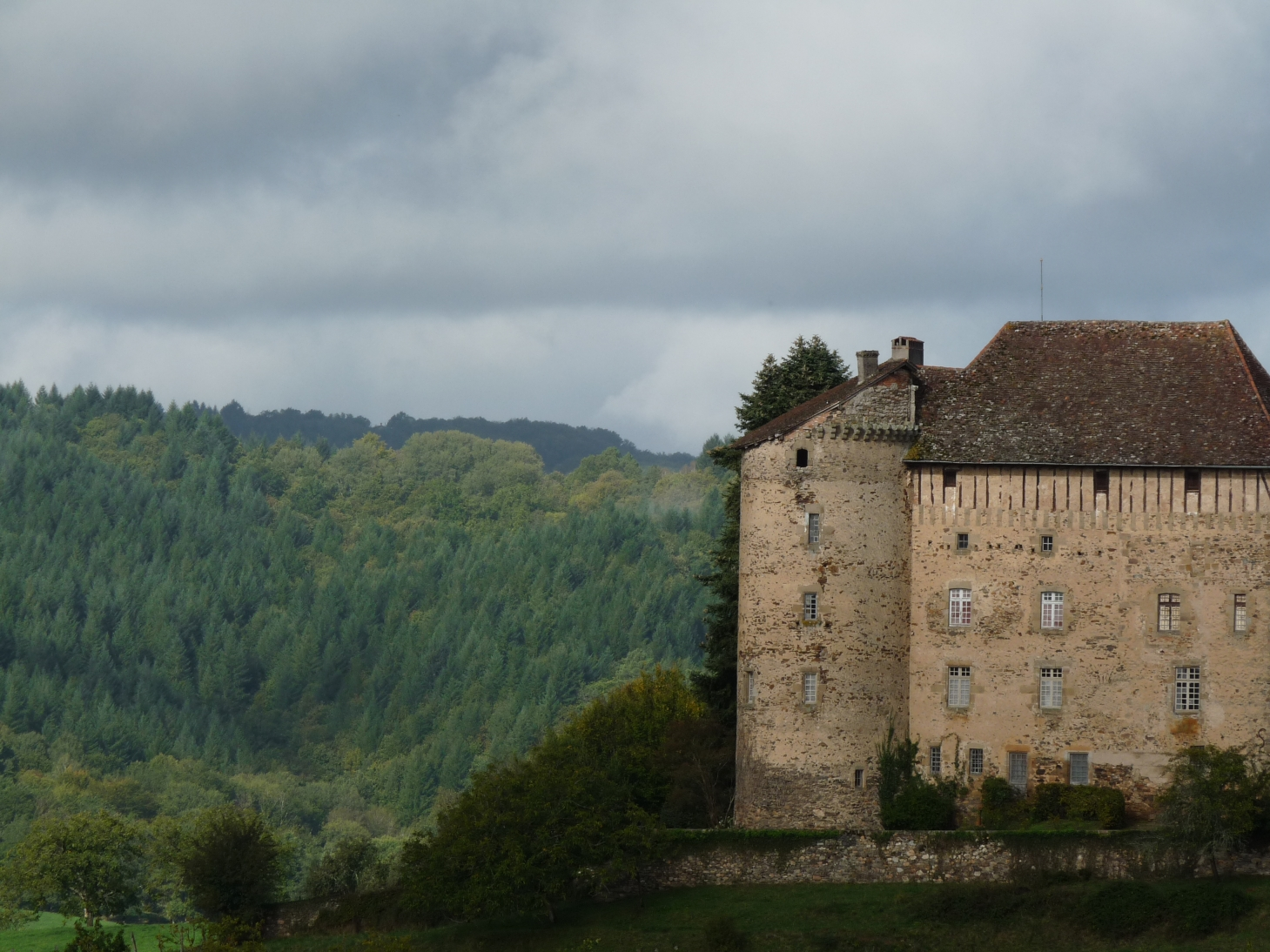
- The chateau in Linac
- Location of Linac
- Location within France Location within Occitanie
- Coordinates: 44°39′59″N 2°06′55″E
- Country: France
- Region: Occitania
- Department: Lot
- Arrondissement: Figeac
- Canton: Figeac-2
- Intercommunality: CC Grand-Figeac

Government
  - Mayor (2020–2026): Jean-Claude Lacombe
- Area^{1}: 12.3 km^{2} (4.7 sq mi)
- Elevation: 432 m (1,417 ft)
- Highest elevation: 467 m (1,532 ft)
- Lowest elevation: 210 m (690 ft)
- Population (2023): 233
  - Density: 18.9/km^{2} (49.1/sq mi)
- Time zone: UTC+01:00 (CET)
  - Summer (DST): UTC+02:00 (CEST)
- INSEE/Postal code: 46174 /46270
- ^{1} French Land Register data, which excludes lakes, ponds, glaciers > 1 km^{2} (0.386 sq mi or 247 acres) and river estuaries.

Linac (French pronunciation: [linak]) is a commune in the Lot department in south-western France.

== See also ==
- Communes of the Lot department
