= Canton of Figeac-2 =

Coordinates: 44.61°N 2.04°E

The canton of Figeac-1 is an administrative division of the Lot department, southern France. It was created at the French canton reorganisation which came into effect in March 2015. Its seat is in Figeac.

It consists of the following communes:

1. Bagnac-sur-Célé
2. Capdenac
3. Cuzac
4. Felzins
5. Figeac (partly)
6. Lentillac-Saint-Blaise
7. Linac
8. Lunan
9. Montredon
10. Prendeignes
11. Saint-Félix
12. Saint-Jean-Mirabel
13. Saint-Perdoux
14. Viazac
