= Joseph Pinetti =

French magician (1750 - c. 1803)

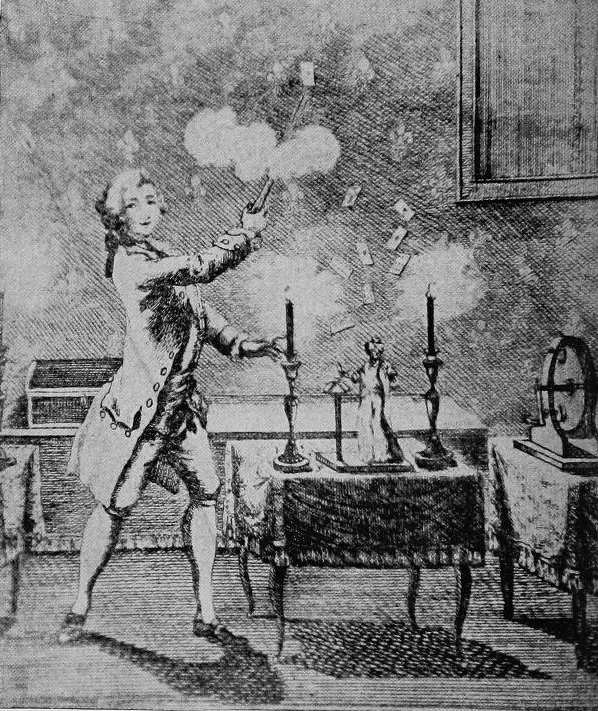
- Occupation: Magician

Giovanni Giuseppe Pinetti, (Joseph Pinetti Willedall de Merci) was known in France as Chevalier Joseph Pinetti (1750–circa 1803). He was born in Orbetello (in Tuscany, Italy) and probably died in Berdychiv (Russian Empire, now a part of Ukraine). He was known as The Professor of Natural Magic and was a complex flamboyant personage. He performed in the later part of the 18th century and was the most celebrated magician of his time. He was the first magician to take advantage of advertising for the theatre.

== Biography ==
The magician of the court of Louis XVI and then under the Directoire and First Empire, author of the Physical Amusements (1784), helped expand the art of magic and also created new effects. At the time, magicians performed in the streets as troubadours. While other performers carried their equipment in bags tied around their waist and carried their tables under their arms, Pinetti brought his experiments as he called them, into the theatre. His predecessors performed with brass and tin gadgets, while Pinetti's was made of gold and silver. In his cabinet of curiosities, he claimed his tricks where based on controlled principles and presented them as scientific experiments. He was a short pudgy man whose demeanor was that of a king. During each performance he would change his gold-embroidered clothes three or four times throughout the evening.

He was a professor in Rome before he became a professional magician. He did tricks for his students and presented them as demonstration of physics. So successful was he that he soon reproduced those demonstrations for his friends. They encouraged him to do it for the public. By 1780, Pinetti was performing in Germany and billed himself as Joseph Pinetti, Roman Professor of Mathematics.

He did such tricks with the impressive name Theophrastus Paracelsus. Pinetti suspended a pigeon by a ribbon that was tied by his neck. A shadow of the bird was projected on the wall. He took a knife and slashed the shadow image of the bird's neck and within seconds it was beheaded.

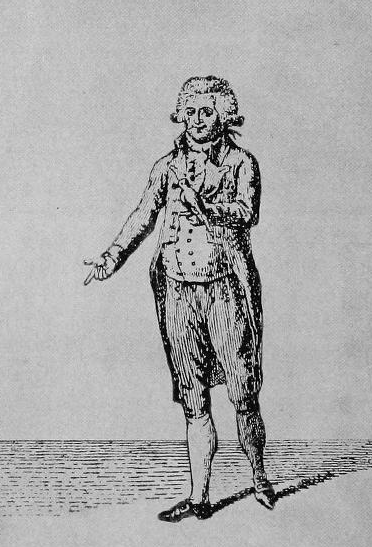
Pinetti

Professor Pinetti performed frequently in his theatre des Menus Plaisirs du Roi, in the suburbs of Paris. His stage setting was glorious while at the same time being straightforward. He had silk curtains around the stage, tables painted gold, and two crystal chandeliers hanging from above. In France, critics said that Pinetti's opening night audience was large. They went on to talk about the twenty-three experiments the Professor demonstrated. Even though he only knew a few words in French, he had no problem charming the distinguished audience. He soon became the talk of Paris. So much so that the King commanded him to do a private performance for him.

During his run in Paris, seats were a premium being booked weeks in advance. Professor Pinetti was riding this crest of fame until in early March 1784, a book was published revealing all of his experiments as mere tricks. La Magic Blanche Dévoilée (Natural Magic Disclosed) was written by a lawyer and student of physics by the name of Henri Decremps. Even though Pinetti's name was not mentioned, it was assumed that book was a revelation on his methods. It quickly became a best seller.

Even though not all of the tricks were correctly explained, the damage was done. Attendance at the theatre dropped. The book ruined the suspense that the experiments brought. In June, Pinetti published his own book Amusements Physiques (Physical Amusements). This was not the expose that Decremps wrote, but an instruction book teaching how to “amuse a company.” Then he went to the providences and rehearsed a new program. From there he went to England and he presented his experiments at the London's New Theatre. Later he performed for King George III and the royal family. While in London (from September 1784 and February 1785) he harshly rivalled with another well-known conjurer, Philip Breslaw.

He returned to Paris, but his tour was shortened when another book was published by Decremps showing the new tricks of Pinetti's. Decremps attempted to perform himself as a magician but was not as skilled on the stage as he was in his books.

Professor Pinetti was mentioned in Robert-Houdin’s memoirs. He told a fantastical story about his mentor Torrini, a/k/a Count Edmond de Grisy confrontation with Pinetti. He claimed that Pinetti was jealous of the newcomer de Grisy and arranged a performance to sabotage him. After the humiliation, de Grisy learned the profession so well, that his skills outmatched those of his rival. So much so that Pinetti was forced to leave France. It was doubtful if there ever was a Count Edmond de Grisy or if he ever was an adversary of Pinetti's.

Professor Pinetti was known for the amount of money he made throughout his career and flaunting it where ever he went. He continued his tour in Portugal and throughout Europe. It was in Berlin where his flaunting backfired on him. While performing in Prussia, he arrived in the capital city of Berlin in a coach drawn by four white horses. He was dressed as a nobleman of the highest rank. His chest was covered with chivalric orders. With all of this strutting, it was no doubt he was the talk of the town.

The King of Prussia, known as Frederick the Great, strolled by in a much plainer coach pulled by only two horses. He saw his guard salute a man he never saw before. After some inquiry, he was told that it was magician Professor Pinetti. When Frederick the Great saw this he was so angry he ordered Pinetti to leave Berlin within twenty-four hours. He said that Berlin was not large enough for two reigning monarchs; the King of Prussia and the King of Conjurers.

Pinetti went to Russia afterwards and was treated better by their ruling monarch. The Czar was so impressed by Pinetti's experiments that he gave the Professor a large ring and a diamond-studded medallion. While in Russia he made a fortune, but lost most of it in a bad investment on a partnership in balloon ascensions.

Robert-Houdin mentions that Pinetti suffered from a long and cruel illness. With all of his wealth, he was reduced to poverty. He was taken in by a nobleman from the town of Berdychiv in Volhynia (modern-day Ukraine). The nobleman gave him shelter out of compassion for the dying man. Pinetti soon died of his illness.

== Publications ==
- Physical Amusements and Diverting Experiments (1784)

== See also ==
- La Maison de la Magie Robert-Houdin
- Nicolas-Philippe Ledru
- Henri Descremps
