= Lissac-et-Mouret =

- Commune
- Location of Lissac-et-Mouret
- Location within France Location within Occitanie
- Coordinates: 44°37′38″N 1°59′19″E
- Country: France
- Region: Occitania
- Department: Lot
- Arrondissement: Figeac
- Canton: Figeac-1
- Intercommunality: CC Grand-Figeac

Government
  - Mayor (2020–2026): Philippe Unal
- Area^{1}: 15.55 km^{2} (6.00 sq mi)
- Elevation: 314 m (1,030 ft)
- Highest elevation: 366 m (1,201 ft)
- Lowest elevation: 182 m (597 ft)
- Population (2023): 973
  - Density: 62.6/km^{2} (162/sq mi)
- Time zone: UTC+01:00 (CET)
  - Summer (DST): UTC+02:00 (CEST)
- INSEE/Postal code: 46175 /46100
- ^{1} French Land Register data, which excludes lakes, ponds, glaciers > 1 km^{2} (0.386 sq mi or 247 acres) and river estuaries.

Lissac-et-Mouret (French pronunciation: [lisak e muʁɛ]; Languedocien: Liçac e Moret) is a commune in the Lot department in south-western France.

== See also ==
- Communes of the Lot department
