= Boussac, Lot =

Boussac
- Commune
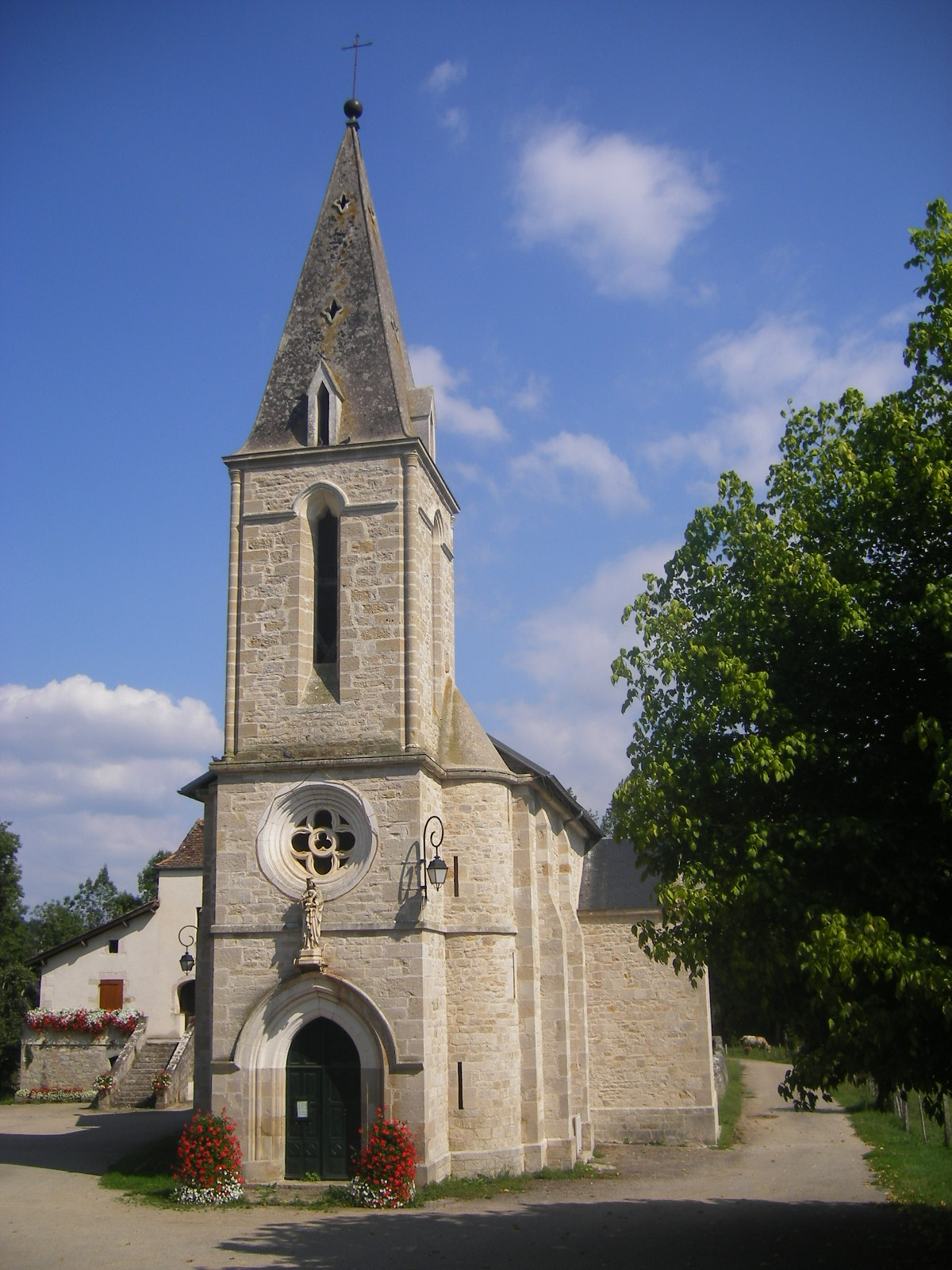
- The church in Boussac

- Coat of arms
- Location of Boussac
- Location within France Location within Occitanie
- Coordinates: 44°36′11″N 1°55′21″E
- Country: France
- Region: Occitania
- Department: Lot
- Arrondissement: Figeac
- Canton: Figeac-1
- Intercommunality: CC Grand-Figeac

Government
  - Mayor (2020–2026): Denis Daynac
- Area^{1}: 7.77 km^{2} (3.00 sq mi)
- Elevation: 214 m (702 ft)
- Highest elevation: 340 m (1,120 ft)
- Lowest elevation: 170 m (560 ft)
- Population (2023): 185
  - Density: 23.8/km^{2} (61.7/sq mi)
- Time zone: UTC+01:00 (CET)
  - Summer (DST): UTC+02:00 (CEST)
- INSEE/Postal code: 46035 /46100
- ^{1} French Land Register data, which excludes lakes, ponds, glaciers > 1 km^{2} (0.386 sq mi or 247 acres) and river estuaries.

Boussac (French pronunciation: [busak]; Occitan: Boçac) is a commune in the Lot department in southwestern France.

== Population ==
Historical population
Year	Pop.	±% p.a.
1968	140	—
1975	127	−1.38%
1982	145	+1.91%
1990	154	+0.76%
1999	178	+1.62%
2007	174	−0.28%
2012	181	+0.79%
2017	185	+0.44%
2023	185	+0.00%
Source: INSEE

== See also ==
- Communes of the Lot department
