= Fons, Lot =

Fons
- Commune
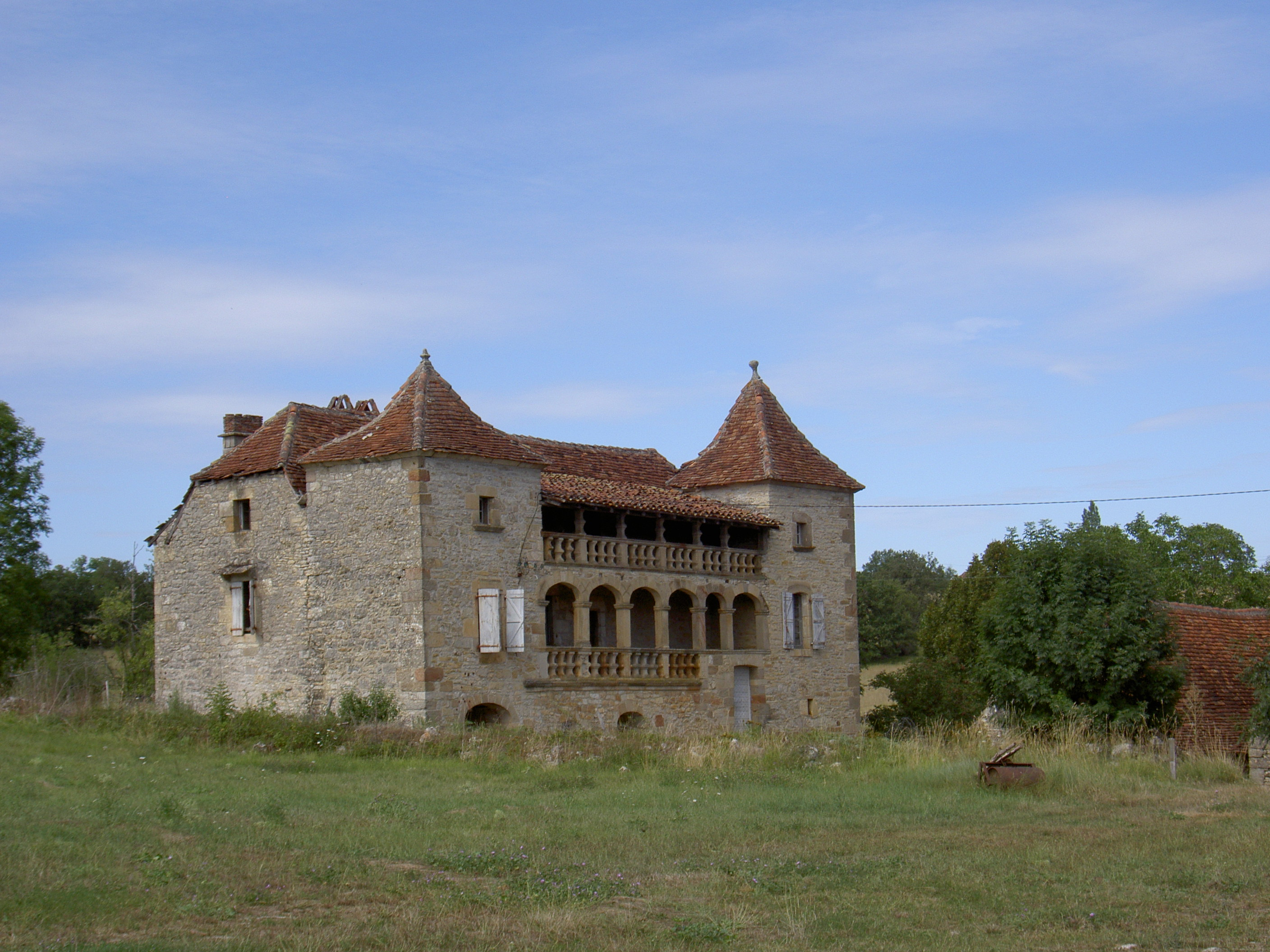
- Reveillac House, in Fons

- Coat of arms
- Location of Fons
- Location within France Location within Occitanie
- Coordinates: 44°39′54″N 1°57′07″E
- Country: France
- Region: Occitania
- Department: Lot
- Arrondissement: Figeac
- Canton: Figeac-1
- Intercommunality: CC Grand-Figeac

Government
  - Mayor (2020–2026): Laurent Martin
- Area^{1}: 14.95 km^{2} (5.77 sq mi)
- Elevation: 260 m (850 ft)
- Highest elevation: 425 m (1,394 ft)
- Lowest elevation: 212 m (696 ft)
- Population (2023): 403
  - Density: 27.0/km^{2} (69.8/sq mi)
- Time zone: UTC+01:00 (CET)
  - Summer (DST): UTC+02:00 (CEST)
- INSEE/Postal code: 46108 /46100
- ^{1} French Land Register data, which excludes lakes, ponds, glaciers > 1 km^{2} (0.386 sq mi or 247 acres) and river estuaries.

Fons is a commune in the Lot department in south-western France. The 19th-century French historian, librarian and palaeographer Léon Lacabane (1798–1884) was born in Fons.

== See also ==
- Communes of the Lot department
