= Camburat =

- Commune
- Coat of arms
- Location of Camburat
- Location within France Location within Occitanie
- Coordinates: 44°38′38″N 1°59′54″E
- Country: France
- Region: Occitania
- Department: Lot
- Arrondissement: Figeac
- Canton: Figeac-1
- Intercommunality: CC Grand-Figeac

Government
  - Mayor (2021–2026): Evelyne Nicol-Heimburger
- Area^{1}: 8.03 km^{2} (3.10 sq mi)
- Elevation: 220 m (720 ft)
- Highest elevation: 400 m (1,300 ft)
- Lowest elevation: 192 m (630 ft)
- Population (2023): 455
  - Density: 56.7/km^{2} (147/sq mi)
- Time zone: UTC+01:00 (CET)
  - Summer (DST): UTC+02:00 (CEST)
- INSEE/Postal code: 46053 /46100
- ^{1} French Land Register data, which excludes lakes, ponds, glaciers > 1 km^{2} (0.386 sq mi or 247 acres) and river estuaries.

Camburat (French pronunciation: [kɑ̃byʁa]) is a commune in the Lot department in south-western France.

== See also ==
- Communes of the Lot department
