= Cuzac =

- Commune
- Location of Cuzac
- Location within France Location within Occitanie
- Coordinates: 44°34′50″N 2°08′38″E
- Country: France
- Region: Occitania
- Department: Lot
- Arrondissement: Figeac
- Canton: Figeac-2
- Intercommunality: CC Grand-Figeac

Government
  - Mayor (2020–2026): Geneviève Vandekerckhove
- Area^{1}: 5.02 km^{2} (1.94 sq mi)
- Elevation: 320 m (1,050 ft)
- Highest elevation: 423 m (1,388 ft)
- Lowest elevation: 170 m (560 ft)
- Population (2023): 238
  - Density: 47.4/km^{2} (123/sq mi)
- Time zone: UTC+01:00 (CET)
  - Summer (DST): UTC+02:00 (CEST)
- INSEE/Postal code: 46085 /46270
- ^{1} French Land Register data, which excludes lakes, ponds, glaciers > 1 km^{2} (0.386 sq mi or 247 acres) and river estuaries.

Cuzac (French pronunciation: [kyzak]; Occitan: Cusac) is a commune in the Lot department in south-western France.

== See also ==
- Communes of the Lot department
