= Felzins =

- Commune
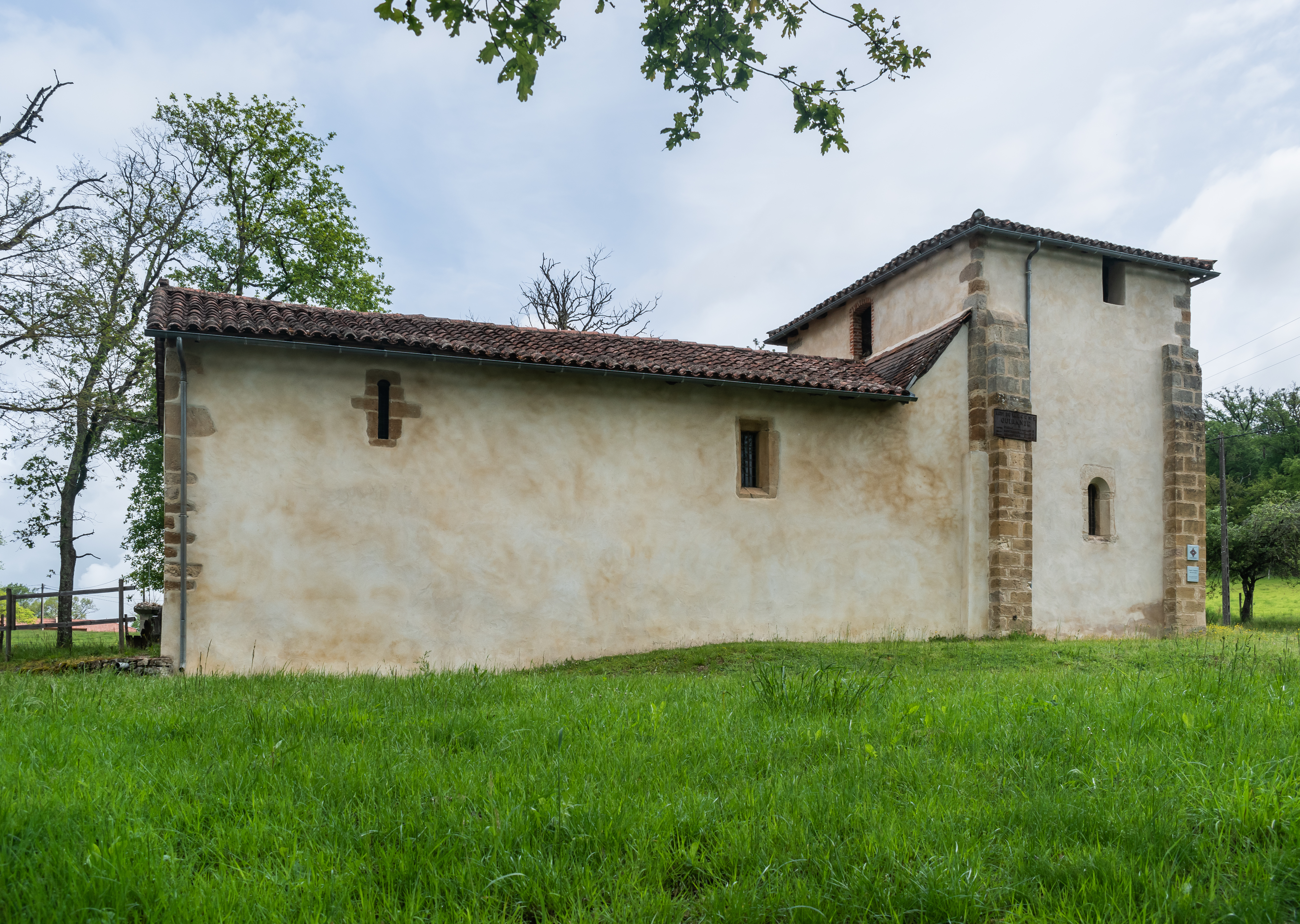
- Chapelle de Guirande
- Location of Felzins
- Location within France Location within Occitanie
- Coordinates: 44°36′18″N 2°08′09″E
- Country: France
- Region: Occitania
- Department: Lot
- Arrondissement: Figeac
- Canton: Figeac-2
- Intercommunality: CC Grand-Figeac

Government
  - Mayor (2020–2026): Marie-Claude Vinel
- Area^{1}: 15.00 km^{2} (5.79 sq mi)
- Elevation: 254 m (833 ft)
- Highest elevation: 423 m (1,388 ft)
- Lowest elevation: 216 m (709 ft)
- Population (2023): 464
  - Density: 30.9/km^{2} (80.1/sq mi)
- Time zone: UTC+01:00 (CET)
  - Summer (DST): UTC+02:00 (CEST)
- INSEE/Postal code: 46101 /46270
- ^{1} French Land Register data, which excludes lakes, ponds, glaciers > 1 km^{2} (0.386 sq mi or 247 acres) and river estuaries.

Felzins (French pronunciation: [fɛlzɛ̃s]; Occitan: Felsins) is a commune in the Lot department in south-western France. The name Felzins comes from the Latin Felzino, Felzinio, Filiciniaco.

== See also ==
- Communes of the Lot department
