= Lunan, Lot =

Lunan
- Commune
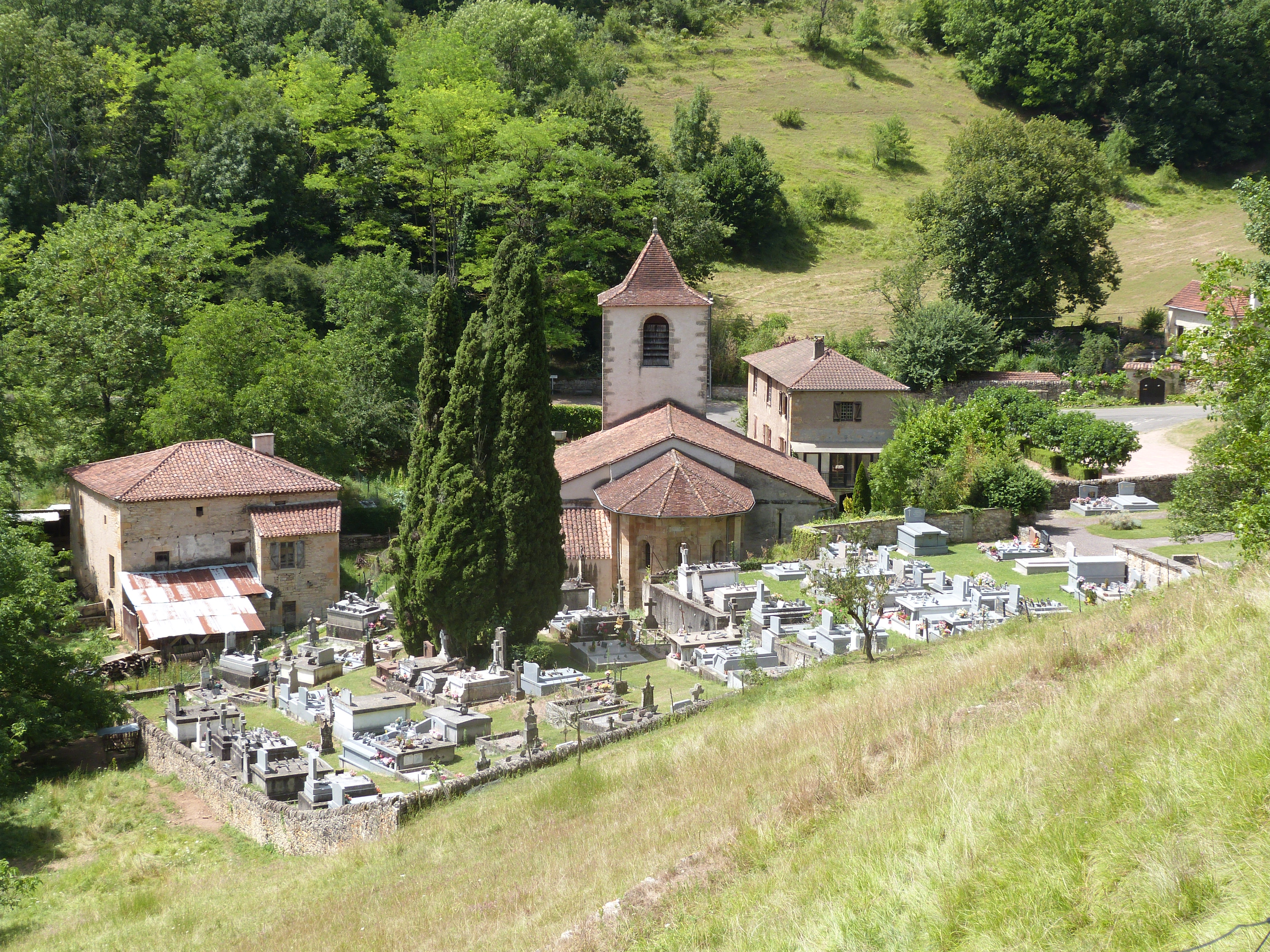
- The church in Lunan
- Location of Lunan
- Location within France Location within Occitanie
- Coordinates: 44°36′15″N 2°05′01″E
- Country: France
- Region: Occitania
- Department: Lot
- Arrondissement: Figeac
- Canton: Figeac-2
- Intercommunality: CC Grand-Figeac

Government
  - Mayor (2020–2026): Sylvie Ercoli
- Area^{1}: 6.15 km^{2} (2.37 sq mi)
- Elevation: 350 m (1,150 ft)
- Highest elevation: 426 m (1,398 ft)
- Lowest elevation: 174 m (571 ft)
- Population (2023): 625
  - Density: 102/km^{2} (263/sq mi)
- Time zone: UTC+01:00 (CET)
  - Summer (DST): UTC+02:00 (CEST)
- INSEE/Postal code: 46180 /46100
- ^{1} French Land Register data, which excludes lakes, ponds, glaciers > 1 km^{2} (0.386 sq mi or 247 acres) and river estuaries.

Lunan (French pronunciation: [lynɑ̃]; Occitan: Lunant) is a commune in the Lot department in south-western France.

== See also ==
- Communes of the Lot department
