= Saint-Perdoux, Lot =

Saint-Perdoux
- Commune
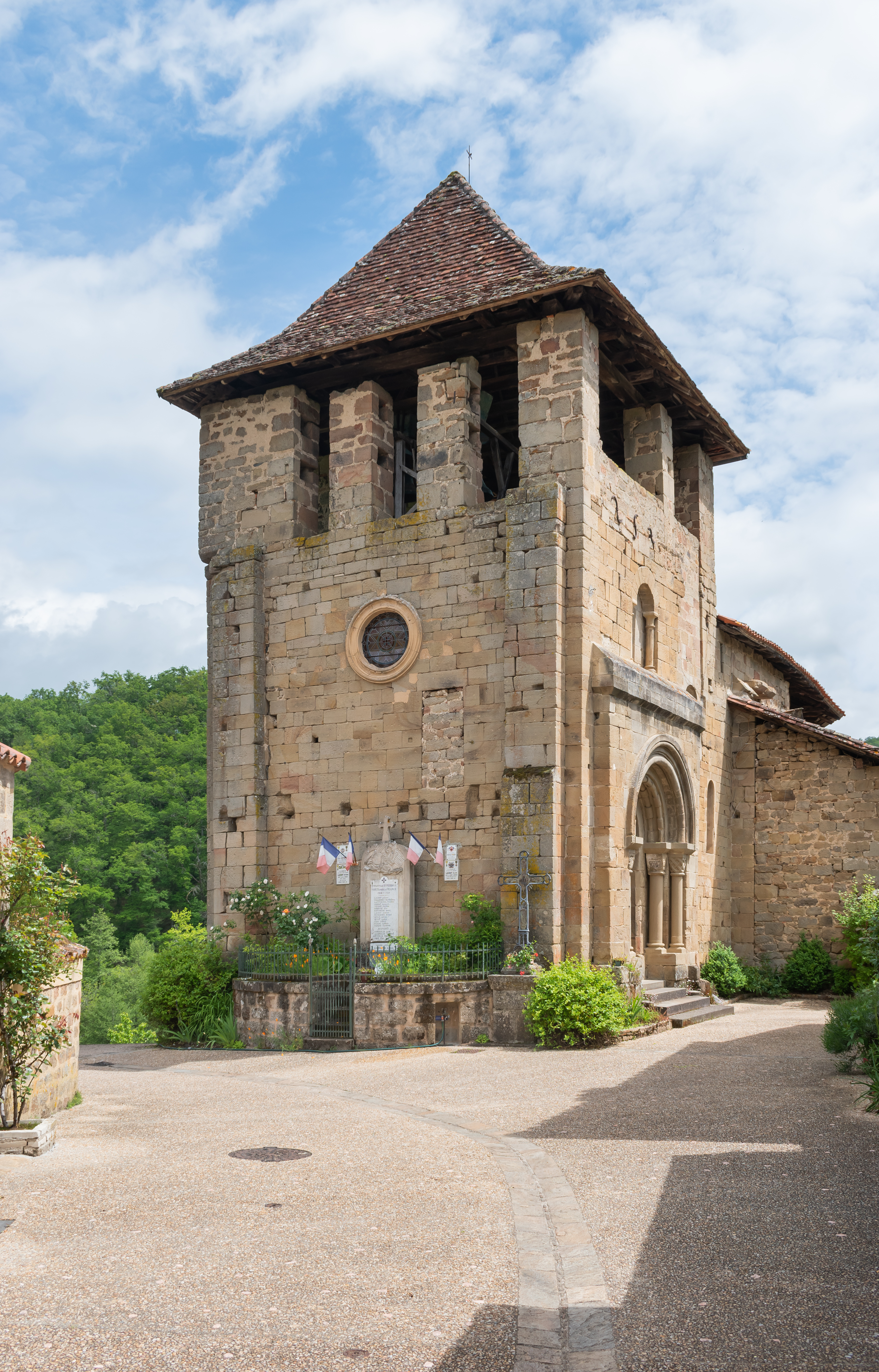
- The church of Saint-Perdoux
- Location of Saint-Perdoux
- Location within France Location within Occitanie
- Coordinates: 44°40′28″N 2°02′54″E
- Country: France
- Region: Occitania
- Department: Lot
- Arrondissement: Figeac
- Canton: Figeac-2
- Intercommunality: CC Grand-Figeac

Government
  - Mayor (2020–2026): Benjamin Fraysse
- Area^{1}: 12.53 km^{2} (4.84 sq mi)
- Elevation: 299 m (981 ft)
- Highest elevation: 526 m (1,726 ft)
- Lowest elevation: 260 m (850 ft)
- Population (2023): 196
  - Density: 15.6/km^{2} (40.5/sq mi)
- Time zone: UTC+01:00 (CET)
  - Summer (DST): UTC+02:00 (CEST)
- INSEE/Postal code: 46288 /46100
- ^{1} French Land Register data, which excludes lakes, ponds, glaciers > 1 km^{2} (0.386 sq mi or 247 acres) and river estuaries.

Saint-Perdoux (French pronunciation: [sɛ̃ pɛʁdu]; Occitan: Sent Perdon) is a commune in the Lot department in south-western France.

== See also ==
- Communes of the Lot department
