= Saint-Félix, Lot =

Saint-Félix
- Commune
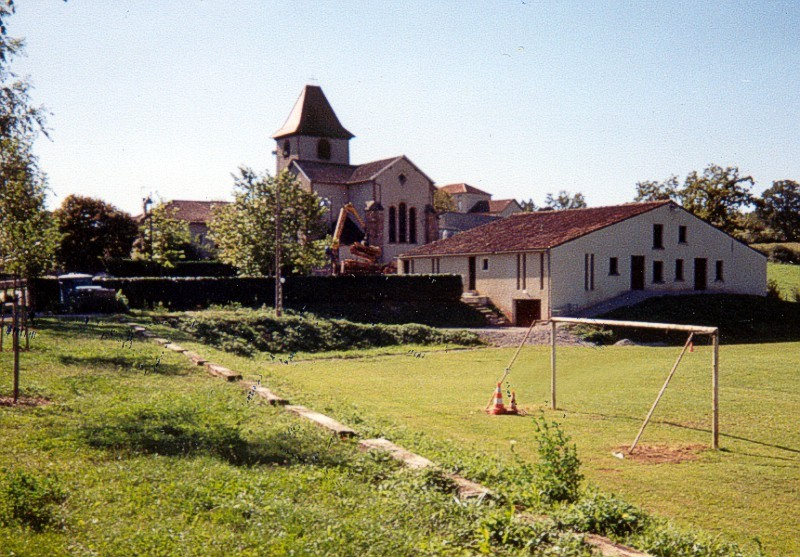
- The church of Sainte-Radegonde
- Location of Saint-Félix
- Location within France Location within Occitanie
- Coordinates: 44°36′43″N 2°07′06″E
- Country: France
- Region: Occitania
- Department: Lot
- Arrondissement: Figeac
- Canton: Figeac-2
- Intercommunality: CC Grand-Figeac

Government
  - Mayor (2020–2026): Jean-Pierre Espeysse
- Area^{1}: 7.73 km^{2} (2.98 sq mi)
- Highest elevation: 393 m (1,289 ft)
- Lowest elevation: 182 m (597 ft)
- Population (2023): 511
  - Density: 66.1/km^{2} (171/sq mi)
- Time zone: UTC+01:00 (CET)
  - Summer (DST): UTC+02:00 (CEST)
- INSEE/Postal code: 46266 /46100
- ^{1} French Land Register data, which excludes lakes, ponds, glaciers > 1 km^{2} (0.386 sq mi or 247 acres) and river estuaries.

Saint-Félix (Languedocien: Sent Fèliç) is a commune in the Lot department in south-western France.

== See also ==
- Communes of the Lot department
