= Corn, Lot =

Corn
- Commune
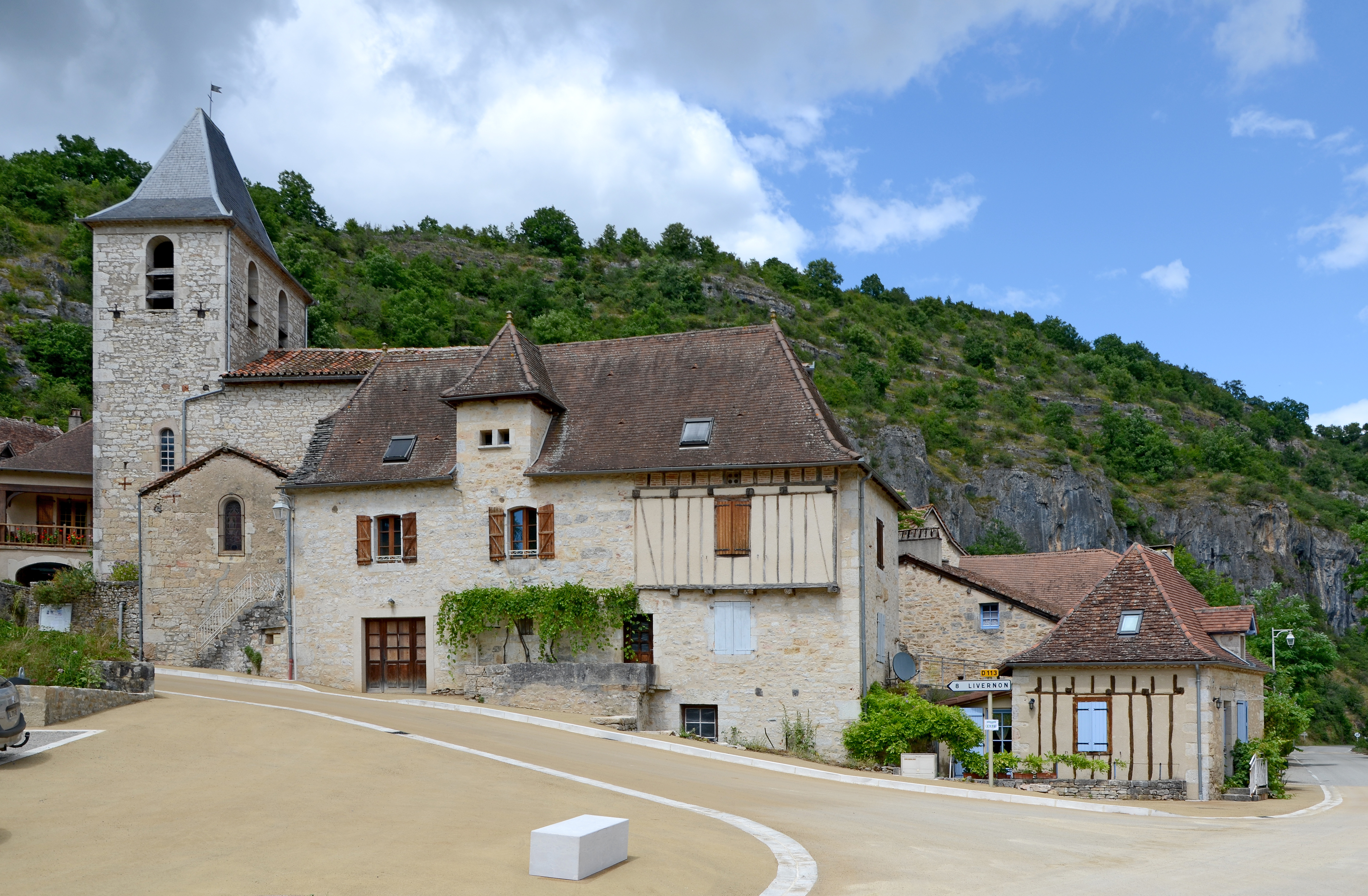
- The village of Corn
- Location of Corn
- Location within France Location within Occitanie
- Coordinates: 44°36′32″N 1°54′00″E
- Country: France
- Region: Occitania
- Department: Lot
- Arrondissement: Figeac
- Canton: Figeac-1
- Intercommunality: CC Grand-Figeac

Government
  - Mayor (2020–2026): Dominique Legresy
- Area^{1}: 15.26 km^{2} (5.89 sq mi)
- Elevation: 159 m (522 ft)
- Highest elevation: 424 m (1,391 ft)
- Lowest elevation: 163 m (535 ft)
- Population (2023): 238
  - Density: 15.6/km^{2} (40.4/sq mi)
- Time zone: UTC+01:00 (CET)
  - Summer (DST): UTC+02:00 (CEST)
- INSEE/Postal code: 46075 /46100
- ^{1} French Land Register data, which excludes lakes, ponds, glaciers > 1 km^{2} (0.386 sq mi or 247 acres) and river estuaries.

Corn (French pronunciation: [kɔʁn]; Occitan: Còrn) is a commune in the Lot department in south-western France.

== See also ==
- Communes of the Lot department
