= Montredon =

Montredon Montredond (Occitan)
- Commune
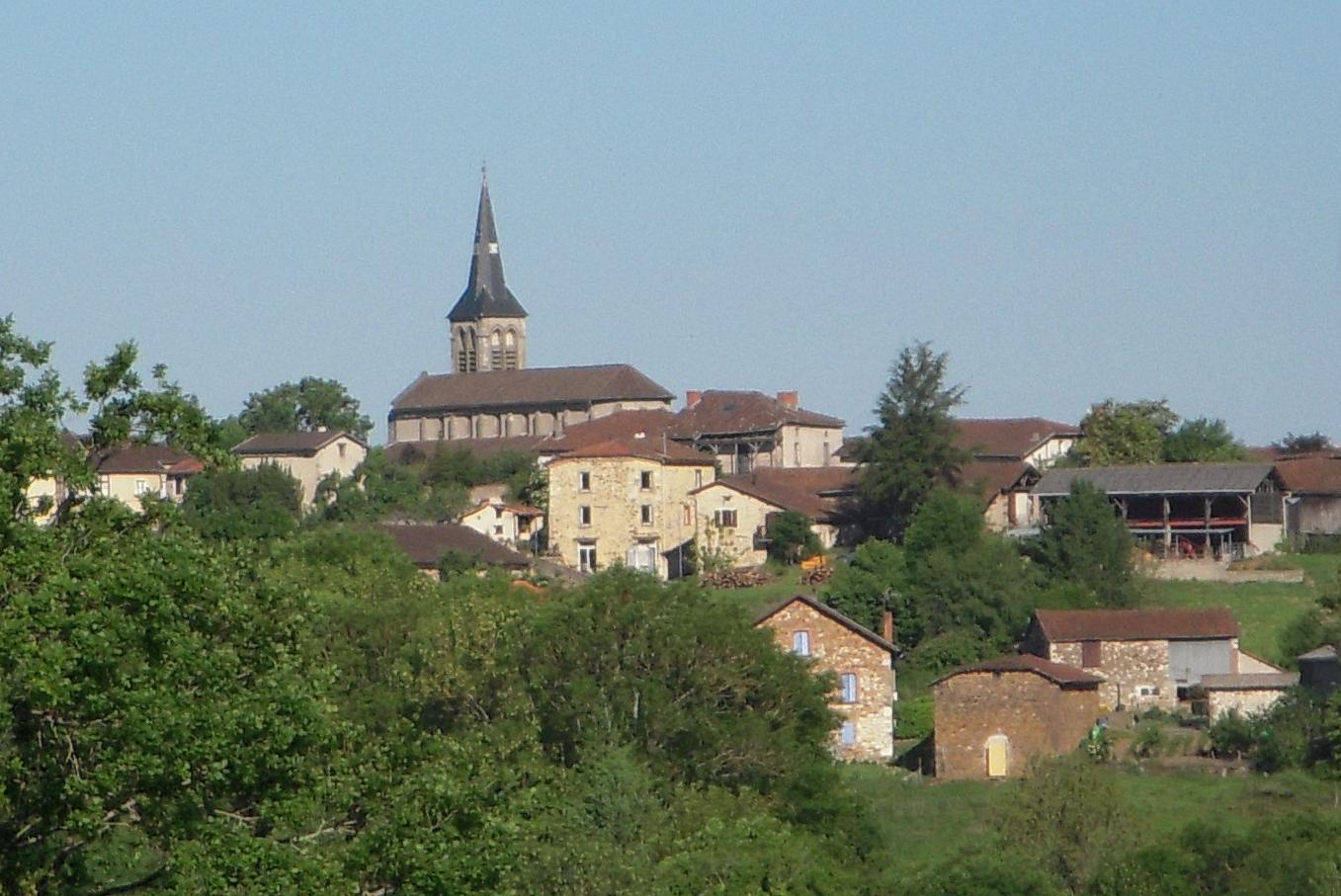
- A general view of Montredon
- Location of Montredon
- Location within France Location within Occitanie
- Coordinates: 44°37′09″N 2°11′32″E
- Country: France
- Region: Occitania
- Department: Lot
- Arrondissement: Figeac
- Canton: Figeac-2
- Intercommunality: CC Grand-Figeac

Government
  - Mayor (2020–2026): Michel Delbos
- Area^{1}: 11.78 km^{2} (4.55 sq mi)
- Highest elevation: 505 m (1,657 ft)
- Lowest elevation: 240 m (790 ft)
- Population (2023): 300
  - Density: 25/km^{2} (66/sq mi)
- Time zone: UTC+01:00 (CET)
  - Summer (DST): UTC+02:00 (CEST)
- INSEE/Postal code: 46207 /46270
- ^{1} French Land Register data, which excludes lakes, ponds, glaciers > 1 km^{2} (0.386 sq mi or 247 acres) and river estuaries.

Montredon (French pronunciation: [mɔ̃(t)ʁ(ə)dɔ̃]; Occitan: Montredond) is a rural commune in the Lot department in the Occitania region in Southwestern France. It is in the Quercy natural region, on the departmental border with both Cantal (in Auvergne-Rhône-Alpes) and Aveyron.

== See also ==
- Communes of the Lot department
