= Cambes, Lot =

Cambes
- Commune
- Location of Cambes
- Location within France Location within Occitanie
- Coordinates: 44°36′56″N 1°56′31″E
- Country: France
- Region: Occitania
- Department: Lot
- Arrondissement: Figeac
- Canton: Figeac-1
- Intercommunality: Grand Figeac

Government
  - Mayor (2022–2026): Marylène Negron
- Area^{1}: 6.57 km^{2} (2.54 sq mi)
- Elevation: 320 m (1,050 ft)
- Highest elevation: 365 m (1,198 ft)
- Lowest elevation: 236 m (774 ft)
- Population (2023): 343
  - Density: 52.2/km^{2} (135/sq mi)
- Time zone: UTC+01:00 (CET)
  - Summer (DST): UTC+02:00 (CEST)
- INSEE/Postal code: 46051 /46100
- ^{1} French Land Register data, which excludes lakes, ponds, glaciers > 1 km^{2} (0.386 sq mi or 247 acres) and river estuaries.

Cambes (French pronunciation: [kɑ̃b]; Occitan: Cambas) is a commune in the Lot department in south-western France.

== See also ==
- Communes of the Lot department
