= Léon Lacabane =

French historian, librarian and palaeographer

- Born: Jean Léon Lacabane; 21 November 1798; Fons, Lot
- Died: 24 December 1884 (aged 86); Paris
- Occupations: Historian; Librarian; Palaeographer

Léon Lacabane (21 November 1798 – 24 December 1884) was a 19th-century French historian, librarian and palaeographer.

== Biography ==
The son of the notary of Fons, Léon Lacabane studied in Figeac before moving to Paris in order to study law, but eventually studied history at the École Nationale des Chartes (1821). First the secretary of the Director of agriculture and stud farms in the Ministry of Interior, he joined the Royal library in 1829. He made his entire career in this institution and retired in 1871. He helped open the resources to researchers and managed to keep to the library the Cabinet of titles claimed by the Imperial Archives.

He was also professor of paleography at the École des Chartes (1846) which he headed from 1857 to 1871.

Preceded by Natalis de Wailly	Director of the École Nationale des Chartes; 1857-1871	Succeeded by Jules Quicherat
