= Maison de la Magie (Blois) =

French museum of magic

Coordinates: 47°35′11″N 1°19′58.62″E

Maison de la Magie Robert-Houdin
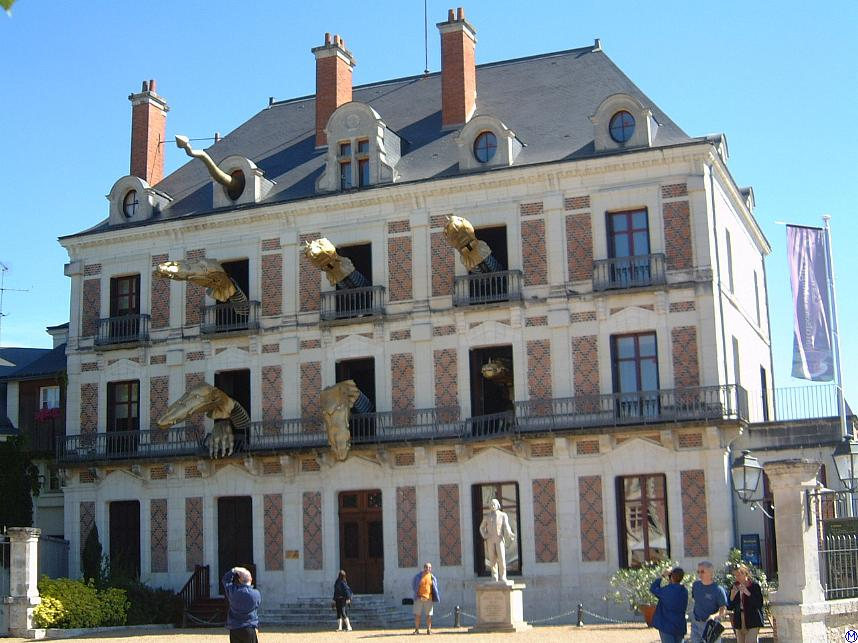
- La Maison de la Magie Robert-Houdin, in Blois, France. Large figures of dragons and a dragon tail emerge from the open windows.
- Established: 1998-06-01
- Location: 1 bis, place du Château, 41000, Blois, France
- Website: Official website of the House of Magic

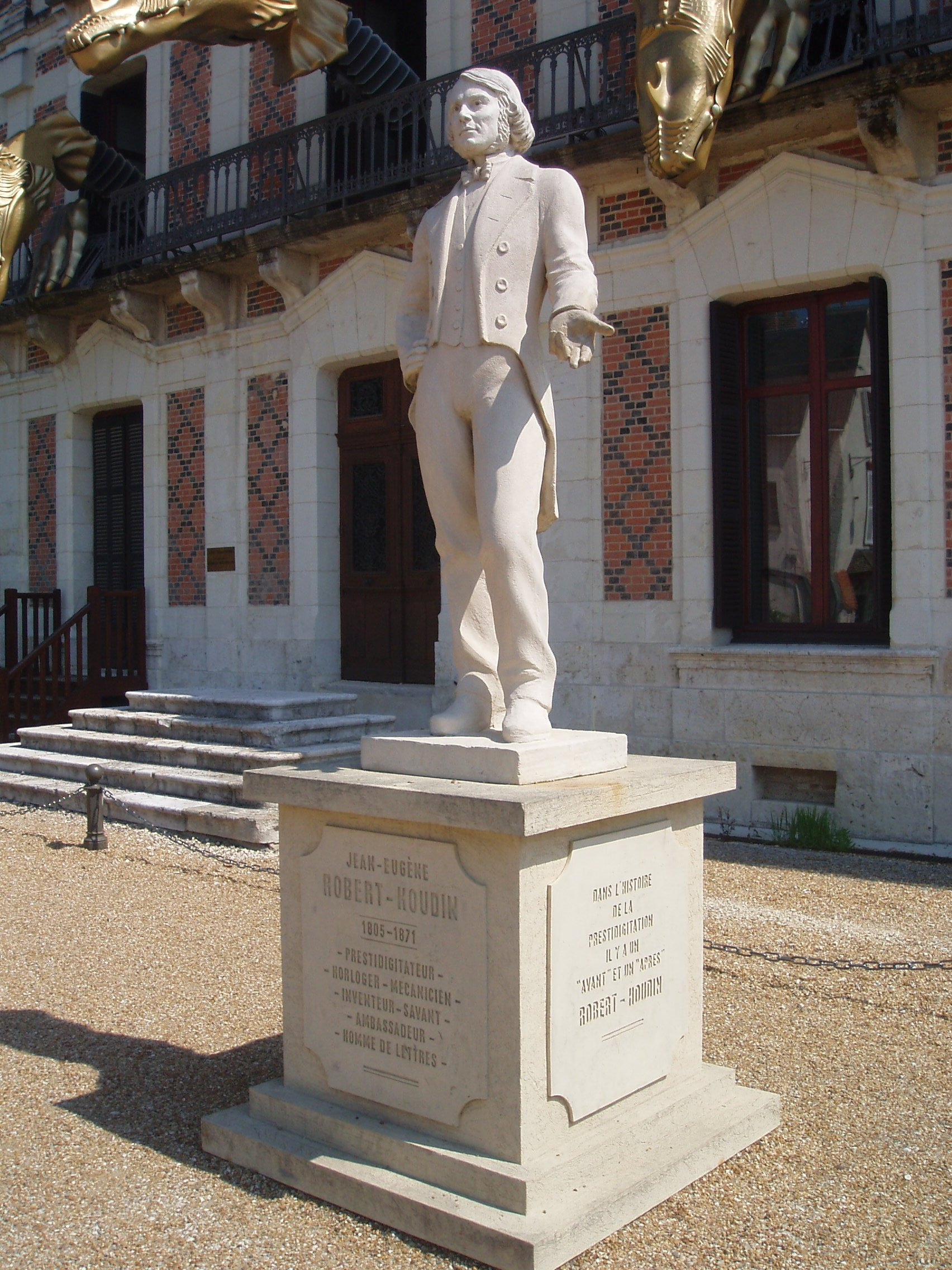
Statue in front of Robert-Houdin's home in Blois

The Maison de la Magie Robert-Houdin (French for "Robert-Houdin House of Magic") is a museum which faces the Royal Château de Blois. It is located in the Loir-et-Cher département in the Loire Valley, in France, in the center of the city of Blois. As a museum of France and bearing the official label of "Musée de France", it is the only public museum in Europe which incorporates in one place collections of magic and a site for permanent performing arts. The creation of such a site is directly linked to the personality of Jean-Eugène Robert-Houdin, a famous French illusionist born in Blois in 1805.

== History ==
Inaugurated in 1998, the museum highlights the life and work of Robert-Houdin—multi-talented illusionist, prestidigitator, inventor, clockmaker and maker of automatons.

In 1981, descendants of Jean Eugène Robert-Houdin left the building and all its contents to the town of Blois with a stipulation requiring they be open to the public. A total of 170 objects that were made or collected by Robert-Houdin are in the museum.

The museum hosts a number of events, some of which are recurring. The include: exhibition of portraits of the greatest magicians; magical encounters (on weekends in July and August); lectures on Jean Eugène Robert-Houdin; evening shows; proceedings of 'the Gala magic clubs of Blois'; and awards to the best magical practitioners.

Guided tours are conducted by illusionists.

== Attractions ==
Highlights include: a six-headed dragon automaton, which was constructed by artists Michel and Jean-Pierre Hartmann and which operates every half-hour; the rotunda, which contains artefacts and displays about the history of magic, art and music; the Greek temple honoring jugglers of the Middle Ages, the physicist Pinetti (eighteenth century magician Joseph Pinetti Willedall de Merci), and genius inventor Buatier De Kolta; a life-sized kaleidoscope and the 'chessboard of the optical illusions'; an exhibition of "The firm of Robert-Houdin fantastic" (Level 1), displaying his watchmaking workshop, scientific research (in optics and electricity) magical craft and 'the mysterious clock'. On Level 3, the "hallucinoscope" ("brainchild" of Gerard Majax) immerses the participant into the world of Jules Verne and his 1870 novel Twenty Thousand Leagues Under the Seas.

Another area is the "Georges Méliès space", which honours him as a magician and as the father of film special effects.

Magic shows are conducted daily and the building is open daily during the tourist season.

== See also ==
- List of magic museums
