= Canton of Figeac-1 =

Coordinates: 44.61°N 2.03°E

The canton of Figeac-1 is an administrative division of the Lot department, southern France. It was created at the French canton reorganisation which came into effect in March 2015. Its seat is in Figeac.

It consists of the following communes:

1. Béduer
2. Boussac
3. Cambes
4. Camboulit
5. Camburat
6. Corn
7. Faycelles
8. Figeac (partly)
9. Fons
10. Fourmagnac
11. Lissac-et-Mouret
12. Planioles
