= Viazac =

- Commune
- Location of Viazac
- Location within France Location within Occitanie
- Coordinates: 44°38′32″N 2°04′33″E
- Country: France
- Region: Occitania
- Department: Lot
- Arrondissement: Figeac
- Canton: Figeac-2
- Intercommunality: CC Grand-Figeac

Government
  - Mayor (2020–2026): Nathalie Philippe
- Area^{1}: 17.74 km^{2} (6.85 sq mi)
- Elevation: 210 m (690 ft)
- Highest elevation: 502 m (1,647 ft)
- Lowest elevation: 200 m (660 ft)
- Population (2023): 344
  - Density: 19.4/km^{2} (50.2/sq mi)
- Time zone: UTC+01:00 (CET)
  - Summer (DST): UTC+02:00 (CEST)
- INSEE/Postal code: 46332 /46100
- ^{1} French Land Register data, which excludes lakes, ponds, glaciers > 1 km^{2} (0.386 sq mi or 247 acres) and river estuaries.

Viazac (French pronunciation: [vjazak]; Occitan: Viasac) is a commune in the Lot department in south-western France.

== See also ==
- Communes of the Lot department
