= Prendeignes =

- Commune
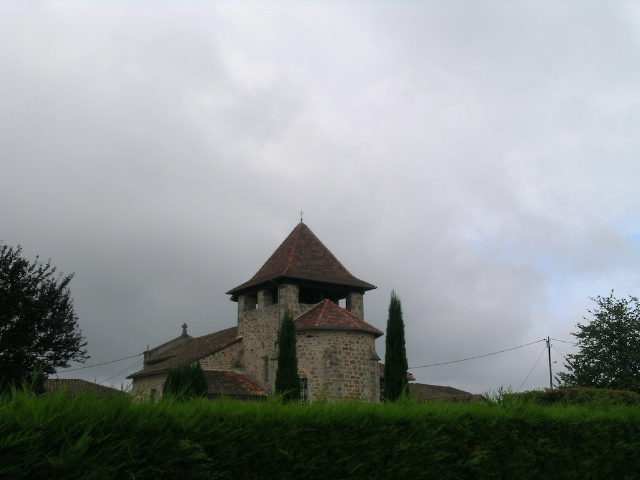
- The church of Prendeignes
- Location of Prendeignes
- Location within France Location within Occitanie
- Coordinates: 44°41′55″N 2°05′24″E
- Country: France
- Region: Occitania
- Department: Lot
- Arrondissement: Figeac
- Canton: Figeac-2
- Intercommunality: CC Grand-Figeac

Government
  - Mayor (2020–2026): Pascal Bahu
- Area^{1}: 15.76 km^{2} (6.08 sq mi)
- Elevation: 400 m (1,300 ft)
- Highest elevation: 552 m (1,811 ft)
- Lowest elevation: 230 m (750 ft)
- Population (2023): 236
  - Density: 15.0/km^{2} (38.8/sq mi)
- Time zone: UTC+01:00 (CET)
  - Summer (DST): UTC+02:00 (CEST)
- INSEE/Postal code: 46226 /46270
- ^{1} French Land Register data, which excludes lakes, ponds, glaciers > 1 km^{2} (0.386 sq mi or 247 acres) and river estuaries.

Prendeignes (French pronunciation: [pʁɑ̃dɛɲ]; Occitan: Prandinhas) is a commune in the Lot department in south-western France.

== See also ==
- Communes of the Lot department
