= Henri Descremps =

Henri Descremps (also spelled Henri Decremps, Béduer, April 1, 1746 – Paris, October 1829) was a French magician, diplomat, and revolutionary activist.

== Biography ==
Henri Descremps was the son of Jean Descremps (also spelled Decremps), a notary public in Figeac and Marie Taillade. He studied mathematics and earned a license in Law. While his father wanted him to become a priest, Henri preferred a secular career as a diplomat, and served as a secretary at the French embassy in London before returning to Paris in 1783.

He studied Western esotericism and stage magic, developing some skills that he used to publish in 1783 his book La Magie blanche dévoilée (White Magic Revealed). The book was immediately successful and was translated into English. Descremps explained there how state magicians produced their tricks, focusing on Joseph Pinetti. Pinetti did not appreciate the book, and reacted by introducing in his shows an actor pretending to be Descremps, who tried without success to explain how the tricks worked. Incited by Pinetti, the audience would then throw the actor out of the theater.

Descremps reacted by publishing not less than four volumes where he revealed additional tricks by Pinetti and denounced him as a charlatan pretending to have paranormal powers. Pinetti preferred to leave France and continue his career in Germany, England, and Russia.

Descremps earned his living in Paris as a teacher, and became an enthusiastic supporter of the French Revolution. His book of 1794, La Science sans-culottisée (Science Brought to Serve Revolution), was the first promoting a revolutionary theory of science, exposing the scientists as not less reactionary than the Catholic priests. Descremps claimed that scientists were part of an aristocratic elite claiming to possess a supposedly neutral “truth,” while in fact science, like all other fields, should be controlled by “the people” and by the revolutionary institutions representing it.

After the Revolution, Descremps was almost forgotten, and continued working as a teacher until his death in Paris in October 1829.
