= Saint-Jean-Mirabel =

- Commune
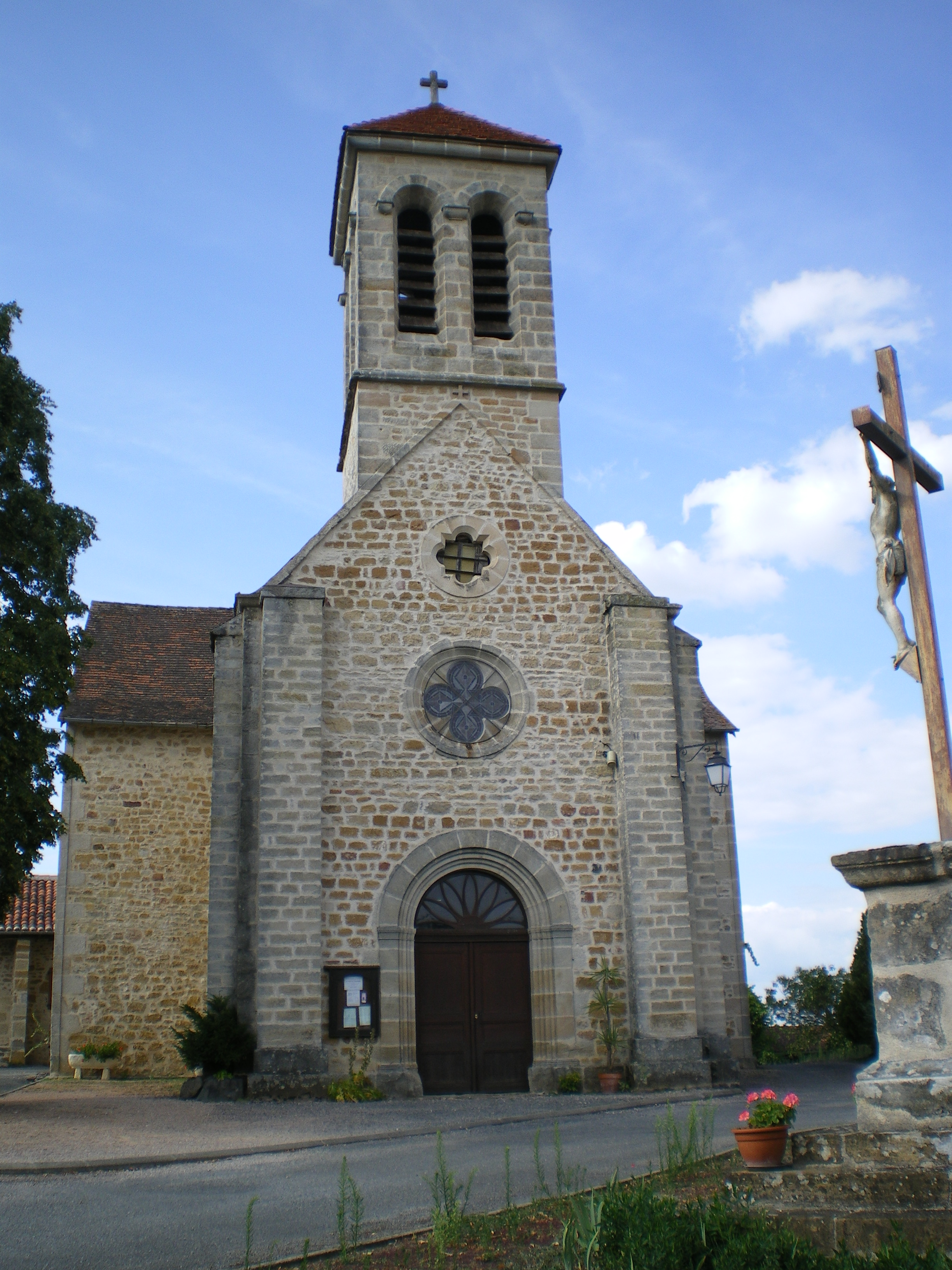
- The church of Saint-Jean
- Location of Saint-Jean-Mirabel
- Location within France Location within Occitanie
- Coordinates: 44°37′18″N 2°06′33″E
- Country: France
- Region: Occitania
- Department: Lot
- Arrondissement: Figeac
- Canton: Figeac-2
- Intercommunality: CC Grand-Figeac

Government
  - Mayor (2020–2026): Bernard Laborie
- Area^{1}: 9.2 km^{2} (3.6 sq mi)
- Elevation: 310 m (1,020 ft)
- Highest elevation: 422 m (1,385 ft)
- Lowest elevation: 210 m (690 ft)
- Population (2023): 296
  - Density: 32/km^{2} (83/sq mi)
- Time zone: UTC+01:00 (CET)
  - Summer (DST): UTC+02:00 (CEST)
- INSEE/Postal code: 46272 /46270
- ^{1} French Land Register data, which excludes lakes, ponds, glaciers > 1 km^{2} (0.386 sq mi or 247 acres) and river estuaries.

Saint-Jean-Mirabel (French pronunciation: [sɛ̃ ʒɑ̃ miʁabɛl]; Languedocien: Sent Joan Mirabèl) is a commune in the Lot department in south-western France.

== See also ==
- Communes of the Lot department
