= Lentillac-Saint-Blaise =

- Commune
- Location of Lentillac-Saint-Blaise
- Location within France Location within Occitanie
- Coordinates: 44°35′31″N 2°07′19″E
- Country: France
- Region: Occitania
- Department: Lot
- Arrondissement: Figeac
- Canton: Figeac-2
- Intercommunality: CC Grand-Figeac

Government
  - Mayor (2020–2026): Didier Bouissou
- Area^{1}: 5.75 km^{2} (2.22 sq mi)
- Elevation: 307 m (1,007 ft)
- Highest elevation: 381 m (1,250 ft)
- Lowest elevation: 175 m (574 ft)
- Population (2023): 191
  - Density: 33.2/km^{2} (86.0/sq mi)
- Time zone: UTC+01:00 (CET)
  - Summer (DST): UTC+02:00 (CEST)
- INSEE/Postal code: 46168 /46100
- ^{1} French Land Register data, which excludes lakes, ponds, glaciers > 1 km^{2} (0.386 sq mi or 247 acres) and river estuaries.

Lentillac-Saint-Blaise (French pronunciation: [lɑ̃tijak sɛ̃ blɛz]; Occitan: Lentilhac Sent Blasi) is a commune in the Lot department in south-western France.

== See also ==
- Communes of the Lot department
