= Planioles =

- Commune
- Location of Planioles
- Location within France Location within Occitanie
- Coordinates: 44°38′05″N 2°01′27″E
- Country: France
- Region: Occitania
- Department: Lot
- Arrondissement: Figeac
- Canton: Figeac-1
- Intercommunality: CC Grand-Figeac

Government
  - Mayor (2020–2026): Guy Lacout
- Area^{1}: 5.85 km^{2} (2.26 sq mi)
- Elevation: 230 m (750 ft)
- Highest elevation: 490 m (1,610 ft)
- Lowest elevation: 217 m (712 ft)
- Population (2023): 554
  - Density: 94.7/km^{2} (245/sq mi)
- Time zone: UTC+01:00 (CET)
  - Summer (DST): UTC+02:00 (CEST)
- INSEE/Postal code: 46221 /46100
- ^{1} French Land Register data, which excludes lakes, ponds, glaciers > 1 km^{2} (0.386 sq mi or 247 acres) and river estuaries.

Planioles (French pronunciation: [planjɔl]; Occitan: Planhòlas) is a commune in the Lot department in south-western France.

== See also ==
- Communes of the Lot department
