= Bagnac-sur-Célé =

Bagnac-sur-Célé Banhac (Occitan)
- Commune
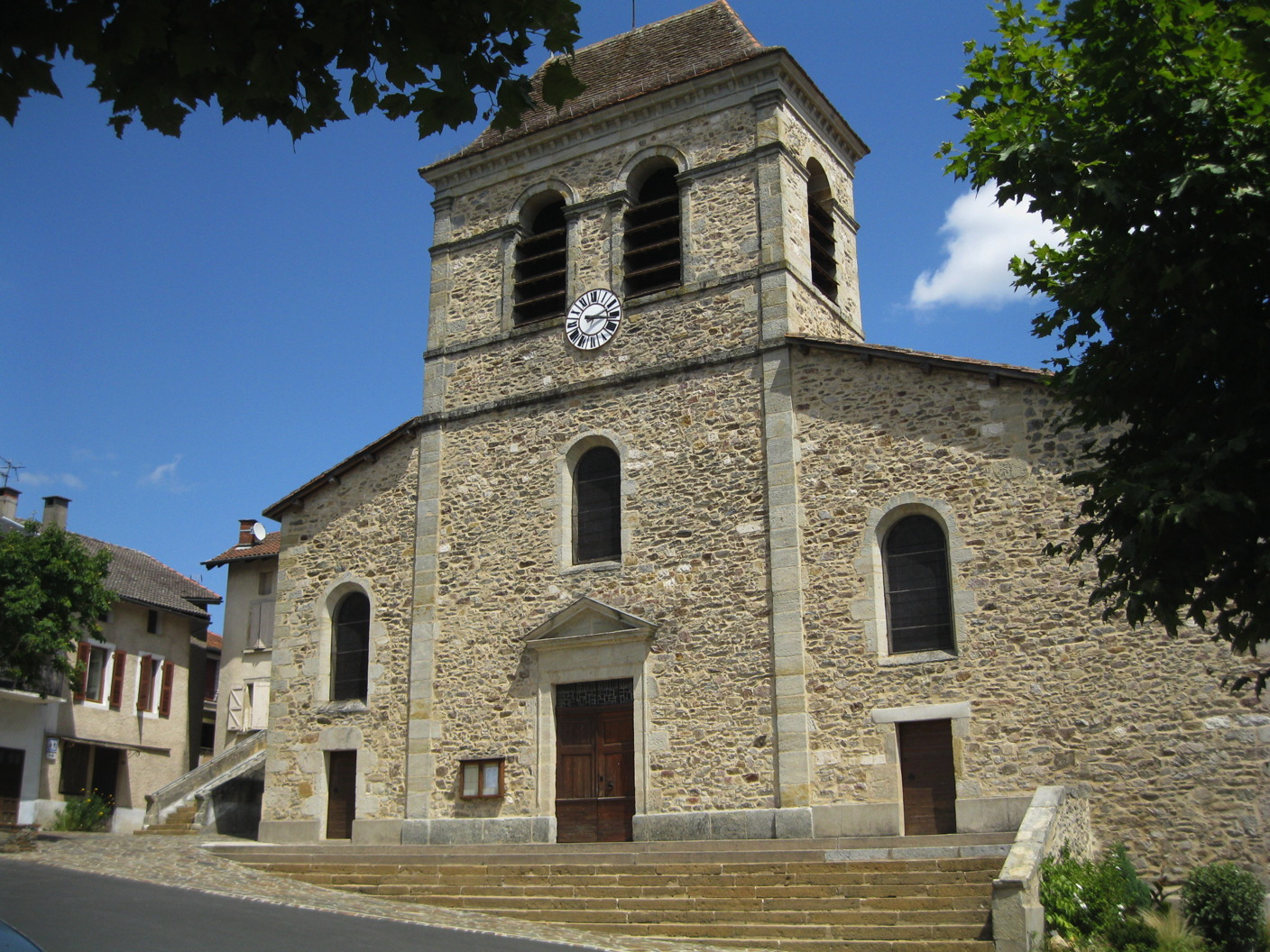
- The church in Bagnac-sur-Célé
- Location of Bagnac-sur-Célé
- Location within France Location within Occitanie
- Coordinates: 44°40′02″N 2°09′33″E
- Country: France
- Region: Occitania
- Department: Lot
- Arrondissement: Figeac
- Canton: Figeac-2
- Intercommunality: CC Grand-Figeac

Government
  - Mayor (2020–2026): Lambert Bru
- Area^{1}: 22.29 km^{2} (8.61 sq mi)
- Elevation: 234 m (768 ft)
- Highest elevation: 478 m (1,568 ft)
- Lowest elevation: 210 m (690 ft)
- Population (2023): 1,467
  - Density: 65.81/km^{2} (170.5/sq mi)
- Time zone: UTC+01:00 (CET)
  - Summer (DST): UTC+02:00 (CEST)
- INSEE/Postal code: 46015 /46270
- ^{1} French Land Register data, which excludes lakes, ponds, glaciers > 1 km^{2} (0.386 sq mi or 247 acres) and river estuaries.

Bagnac-sur-Célé (French pronunciation: [baɲak syʁ sele], lit. 'Bagnac-on-Célé'; Occitan: Banhac), commonly referred to simply as Bagnac, is a commune in the Lot department in the Occitania region in Southwestern France. Bagnac-sur-Célé is located on the departmental border with Cantal, 11.6 km (7.2 mi) northeast of Figeac.

== Demographics ==
Historical population
Year	Pop.	±% p.a.
1968	1,670	—
1975	1,691	+0.18%
1982	1,724	+0.28%
1990	1,582	−1.07%
1999	1,519	−0.45%
2007	1,567	+0.39%
2012	1,562	−0.06%
2017	1,475	−1.14%
2023	1,467	−0.09%
Source: INSEE

== Notable people ==
- Pierre Laborie (1936–2017), historian, born in Bagnac-sur-Célé

== See also ==
- Communes of the Lot department
