= Laborie (company) =

American endoscopy product manufacturer and supplier

- Company type: Public company
- Traded as: Nasdaq: CGNT
- Industry: Medical Equipment
- Founded: 1987
- Headquarters: Orangeburg, New York, United States
- Revenue: US$16.33 Million (As of 2013)
- Website: Official website

Cogentix Medical (Nasdaq: CGNT) is an international endoscopy product manufacturer and supplier. It was founded in 1987 by Lewis C. Pell and Katsumi Oneda and is based in Orangeburg, New York. In December 2013, the company was selected by 21st Century Oncology Inc. as 21st Century’s Preferred Vendor of Choice, and Laborie's products will be applied in medical treatment in a variety of therapeutic areas, including cancer care.

== Background ==
EndoSheath technology is a patented technology of the company. It was invented by Dr. Fred E. Silverstein, who is a notable gastroenterologist. He believed that the reprocess of endoscope was complex at that time and wanted to improve the technology with lower cost and less contamination risk. During the outbreak of the Nightmare Bacteria "Super bug", which raises cross-contamination problems at Advocate Lutheran General Hospital, the EndoSheath solutions successfully reduced patients’ infection.

The company has two segments including medical and industrial. The medical segment develops and manufactures endoscopy products incorporating its EndoSheath technology for professionals through its subsidiary, Machida, Inc. The product of industrial segment are borescopes provided to aircraft engine industry. The endoscope products and EndoSheath technology of the company have markets in urology, pulmonology, surgery, gastroenterology, ENT and spine.
