= Fourmagnac =

- Commune
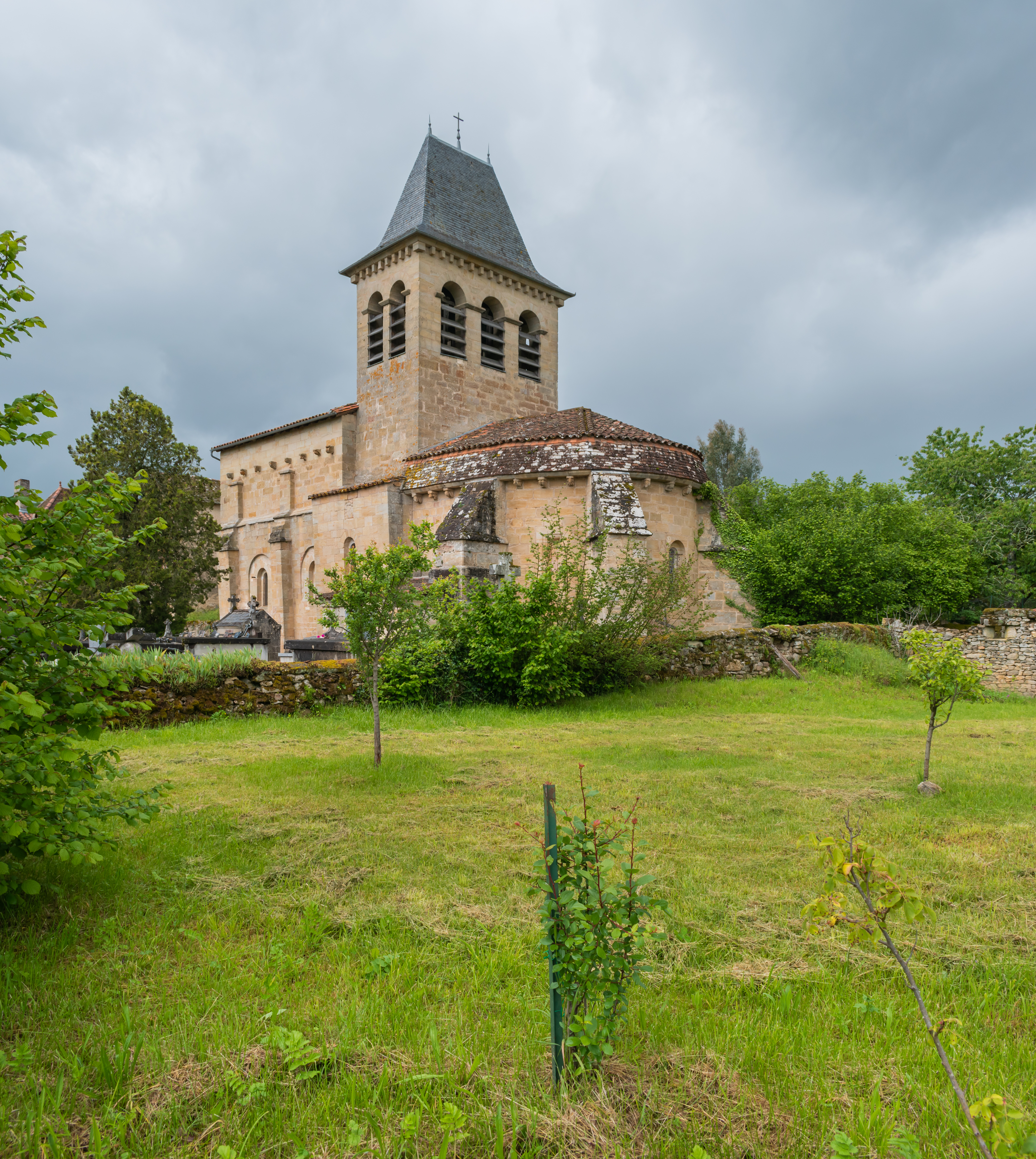
- The church in Fourmagnac
- Location of Fourmagnac
- Location within France Location within Occitanie
- Coordinates: 44°39′51″N 1°58′49″E
- Country: France
- Region: Occitania
- Department: Lot
- Arrondissement: Figeac
- Canton: Figeac-1
- Intercommunality: CC Grand-Figeac

Government
  - Mayor (2020–2026): Alain Daniere
- Area^{1}: 3.78 km^{2} (1.46 sq mi)
- Elevation: 218 m (715 ft)
- Highest elevation: 364 m (1,194 ft)
- Lowest elevation: 213 m (699 ft)
- Population (2023): 178
  - Density: 47.1/km^{2} (122/sq mi)
- Time zone: UTC+01:00 (CET)
  - Summer (DST): UTC+02:00 (CEST)
- INSEE/Postal code: 46111 /46100
- ^{1} French Land Register data, which excludes lakes, ponds, glaciers > 1 km^{2} (0.386 sq mi or 247 acres) and river estuaries.

Fourmagnac (French pronunciation: [fuʁmaɲak]; Occitan: Formanhac) is a commune in the Lot department in south-western France.

== See also ==
- Communes of the Lot department
