= Pierre Laborie =

French historian

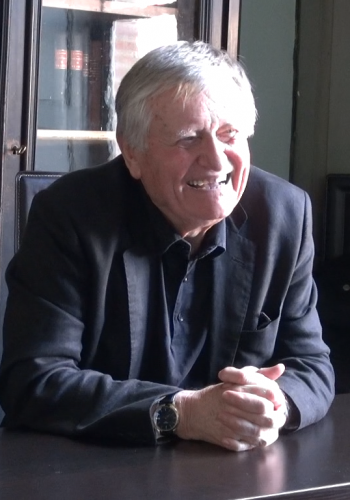
- Born: 4 January 1936; Bagnac-sur-Célé, Lot, France
- Died: 16 May 2017 (aged 81); Cahors, Lot, France

Academic work
- Discipline: French history
- Institutions: Université de Toulouse-Le Mirail; EHESS
- Main interests: Public opinion in Vichy France

Pierre Laborie (French pronunciation: [pjɛʁ labɔʁi]; 4 January 1936 – 16 May 2017) was a French historian who was best known for his studies of French public opinion during World War II.

== Biography ==
Pierre Laborie was born in Bagnac-sur-Célé, Lot on 4 January 1936. The area was profoundly marked by the violent repression of the resistance activity by German forces during World War II. He initially taught history and geography at school level while also conducting his own research with the support of the Comité d’histoire de la Deuxième Guerre mondiale. He later gained a doctorate in History in 1978 with a thesis on public opinion in the Lot during the conflict which drew heavily on linguistics. He was a professor at the Université de Toulouse-Le Mirail and was active within the Institut d'histoire du temps présent (IHTP). He was appointed director of studies at the École des hautes études en sciences sociales (EHESS) in 1990. In his later research, he became increasingly interested in the historical memory of the conflict.

His most notable publication was L'Opinion française sous Vichy (1990) which was hailed as "pioneering". His work was critical of the old historiography of Henri Michel and the revisionist school of Robert Paxton. He was critical of the idea of a shared public opinion. He placed more emphasis on attentisme and wartime swings in attitudes towards the Vichy regime and Free French. He emphasised the continuities in the "social imaginary)" between the crisis of identity in the 1930s and the establishment of the Vichy regime in 1940.
