= Faycelles =

- Commune
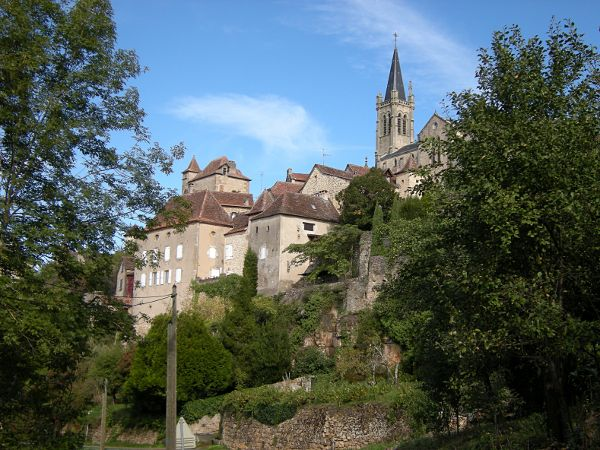
- A general view of Faycelles

- Coat of arms
- Location of Faycelles
- Location within France Location within Occitanie
- Coordinates: 44°33′59″N 1°59′14″E
- Country: France
- Region: Occitania
- Department: Lot
- Arrondissement: Figeac
- Canton: Figeac-1
- Intercommunality: CC Grand-Figeac

Government
  - Mayor (2020–2026): Jean-Claude Laborie
- Area^{1}: 14.08 km^{2} (5.44 sq mi)
- Elevation: 340 m (1,120 ft)
- Highest elevation: 373 m (1,224 ft)
- Lowest elevation: 150 m (490 ft)
- Population (2023): 740
  - Density: 53/km^{2} (140/sq mi)
- Time zone: UTC+01:00 (CET)
  - Summer (DST): UTC+02:00 (CEST)
- INSEE/Postal code: 46100 /46100
- ^{1} French Land Register data, which excludes lakes, ponds, glaciers > 1 km^{2} (0.386 sq mi or 247 acres) and river estuaries.

Faycelles (French pronunciation: [fɛsɛl]; Occitan: Faicelas) is a commune in the Lot department in south-western France.

== See also ==
- Communes of the Lot department
