= Célé =

River in south-western France

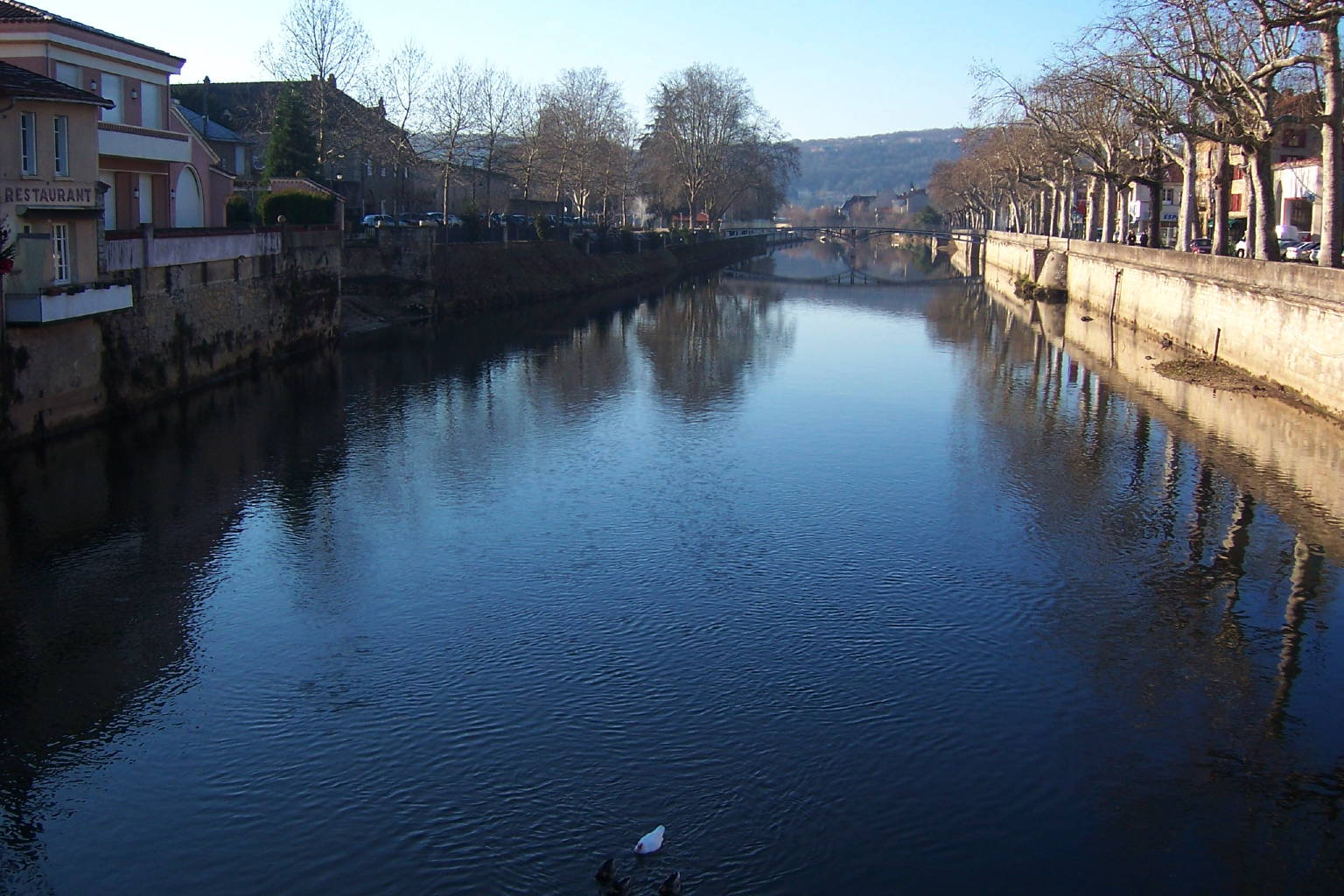
- The Célé in the town of Figeac

- Location within France Location within Occitanie

Location
- Country: France

Physical characteristics
- Source
  - location: Massif Central
- Mouth
  - location: Lot
  - coordinates: 44°28′28″N 1°38′55″E
- Length: 104.4 km (64.9 mi)

Basin features
- Progression: Lot→ Garonne→ Gironde estuary→ Atlantic Ocean

The Célé (French pronunciation: [sele]) is a 104.4 km (64.9 mi) long river in the Cantal and Lot departments in south-western France, a tributary of the Lot. Its source is near Calvinet in the Cantal. It flows generally west through the following departments and towns:

- Cantal: Saint-Constant
- Lot: Bagnac-sur-Célé, Figeac

The Célé flows into the Lot at Bouziès.
