= Polastron =

Polastron may refer to:

== Places ==
- Polastron, Gers, a commune in the Gers département, in France
- Polastron, Haute-Garonne, a commune in the Haute-Garonne département, in France

== People ==
- Lucien Polastron (born 1944), a French writer and historian
- Yolande de Polastron (1749–1793), French noblewoman and royal favorite
