= Bourgade (disambiguation) =

Bourgade is a French-language surname.

Bourgade or La Bourgade may also refer to:

- Bourgade Catholic High School, Phoenix, Arizona, United States
- La Bourgade, a former name of Cummingsburg, a ward in Georgetown, Guyana
- La Bourgade, a village in the commune Angles, Alpes-de-Haute-Provence, France
