= Nizas =

Nizas is the name of two communes in France:

- Nizas, in the Gers department
- Nizas, in the Hérault department
