= Canton of Val de Save =

Administrative division of Gers department, France

Coordinates: 43.49°N 0.93°E

The canton of Val de Save is an administrative division of the Gers department, southwestern France. It was created at the French canton reorganisation which came into effect in March 2015. Its seat is in Samatan.

It consists of the following communes:

1. Betcave-Aguin
2. Bézéril
3. Cadeillan
4. Castillon-Savès
5. Cazaux-Savès
6. Espaon
7. Garravet
8. Gaujac
9. Gaujan
10. Labastide-Savès
11. Lahas
12. Laymont
13. Lombez
14. Monblanc
15. Mongausy
16. Montadet
17. Montamat
18. Montégut-Savès
19. Montpézat
20. Nizas
21. Noilhan
22. Pébées
23. Pellefigue
24. Polastron
25. Pompiac
26. Puylausic
27. Sabaillan
28. Saint-André
29. Saint-Élix-d'Astarac
30. Saint-Lizier-du-Planté
31. Saint-Loube
32. Saint-Soulan
33. Samatan
34. Sauveterre
35. Sauvimont
36. Savignac-Mona
37. Seysses-Savès
38. Simorre
39. Tournan
40. Villefranche
