= Montégut-Savès =

- Commune
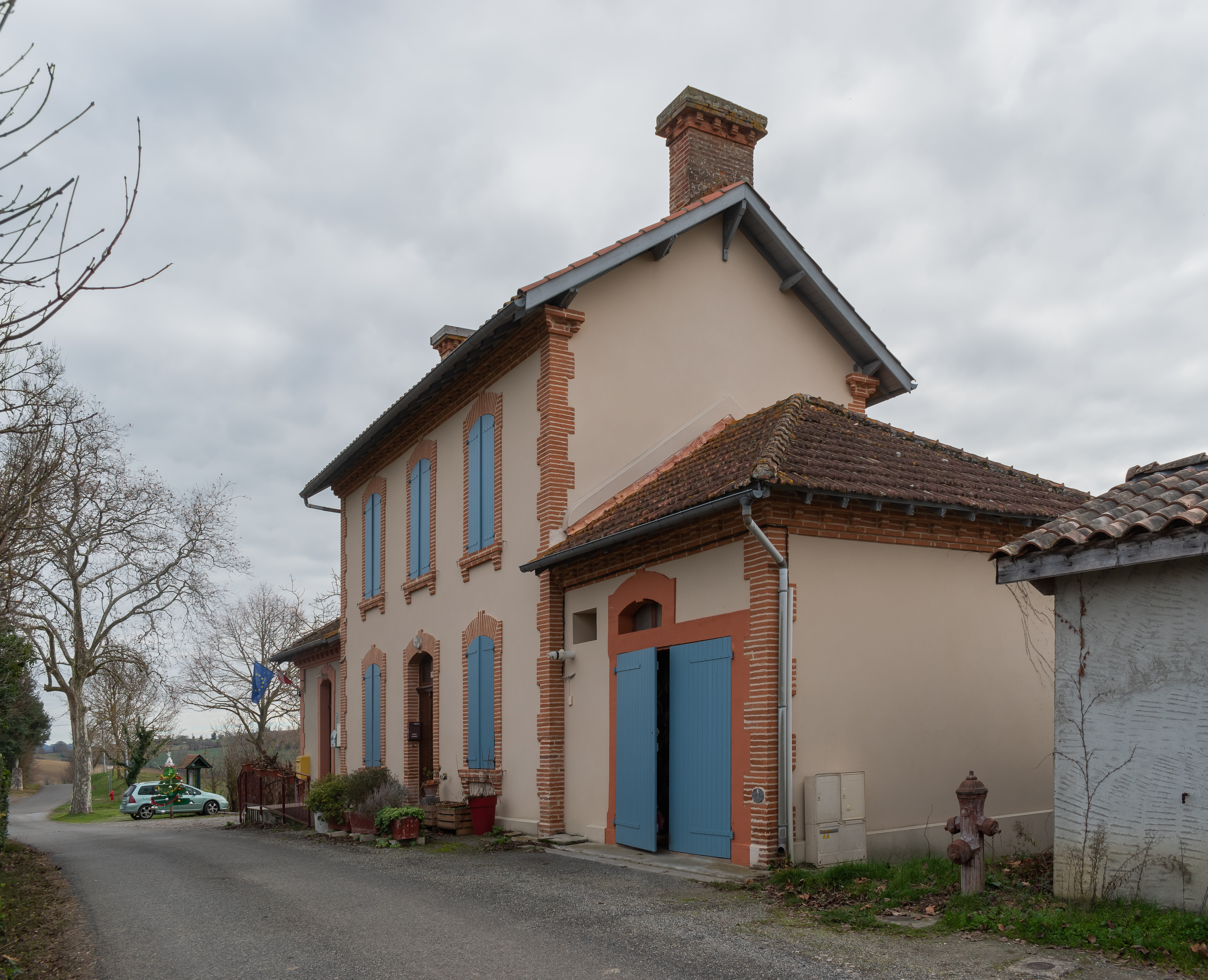
- Location of Montégut-Savès
- Location within France Location within Occitanie
- Coordinates: 43°26′34″N 0°57′38″E
- Country: France
- Region: Occitania
- Department: Gers
- Arrondissement: Auch
- Canton: Val de Save

Government
  - Mayor (2020–2026): Christian Nauroy
- Area^{1}: 3.69 km^{2} (1.42 sq mi)
- Elevation: 275 m (902 ft)
- Highest elevation: 271 m (889 ft)
- Lowest elevation: 175 m (574 ft)
- Population (2023): 68
  - Density: 18/km^{2} (48/sq mi)
- Time zone: UTC+01:00 (CET)
  - Summer (DST): UTC+02:00 (CEST)
- INSEE/Postal code: 32284 /32220
- ^{1} French Land Register data, which excludes lakes, ponds, glaciers > 1 km^{2} (0.386 sq mi or 247 acres) and river estuaries.

Montégut-Savès (French pronunciation: [mɔ̃teɡy savɛs]; Occitan: Montagut de Savés) is a commune in the Gers department in southwestern France.

== Geography ==
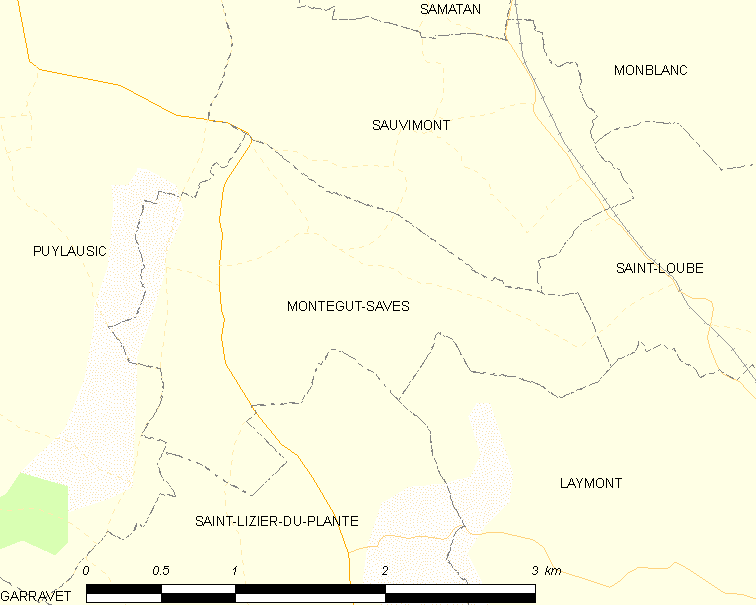
Montégut-Savès and its surrounding communes

== Population ==
Historical population
Year	Pop.	±% p.a.
1968	96	—
1975	86	−1.56%
1982	89	+0.49%
1990	69	−3.13%
1999	68	−0.16%
2007	73	+0.89%
2012	69	−1.12%
2017	64	−1.49%
2023	68	+1.02%
Source: INSEE

== See also ==
- Communes of the Gers department
- Savès
