= Saint-Loube =

Commune in Gers, France

- Commune
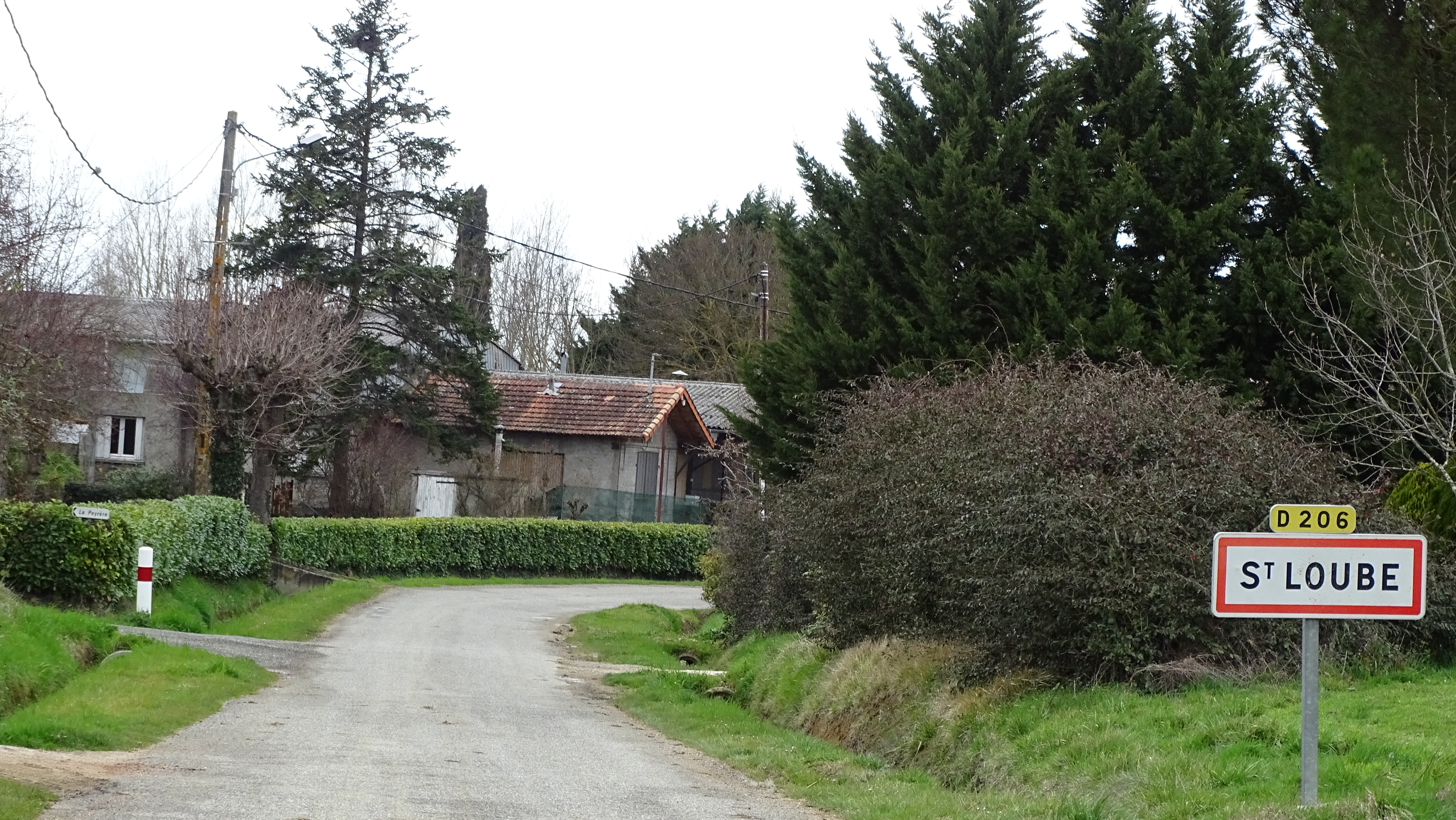
- The road into Saint-Loube
- Location of Saint-Loube
- Location within France Location within Occitanie
- Coordinates: 43°26′25″N 0°59′33″E
- Country: France
- Region: Occitania
- Department: Gers
- Arrondissement: Auch
- Canton: Val de Save
- Intercommunality: Savès

Government
  - Mayor (2020–2026): Claude Perin
- Area^{1}: 6.09 km^{2} (2.35 sq mi)
- Elevation: 189 m (620 ft)
- Highest elevation: 305 m (1,001 ft)
- Lowest elevation: 183 m (600 ft)
- Population (2023): 96
  - Density: 16/km^{2} (41/sq mi)
- Time zone: UTC+01:00 (CET)
  - Summer (DST): UTC+02:00 (CEST)
- INSEE/Postal code: 32387 /32220
- ^{1} French Land Register data, which excludes lakes, ponds, glaciers > 1 km^{2} (0.386 sq mi or 247 acres) and river estuaries.

Saint-Loube (French pronunciation: [sɛ̃ lub]; Occitan: Sent Loba e Amadas) is a commune in the Gers department in southwestern France.

== Geography ==
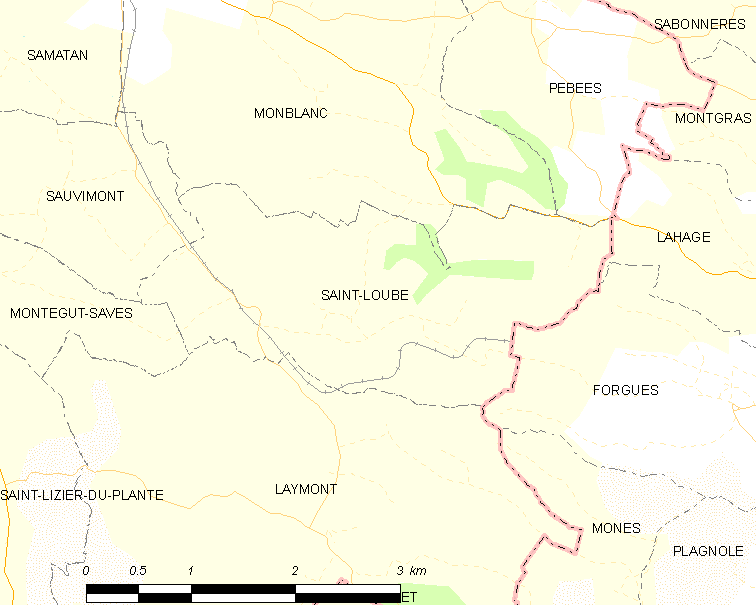
Saint-Loube and its surrounding communes

== Population ==
Historical population
Year	Pop.	±% p.a.
1968	99	—
1975	83	−2.49%
1982	72	−2.01%
1990	69	−0.53%
1999	62	−1.18%
2007	87	+4.33%
2012	94	+1.56%
2017	96	+0.42%
2023	96	+0.00%
Source: INSEE

== See also ==
- Communes of the Gers department
