= Pellefigue =

- Commune
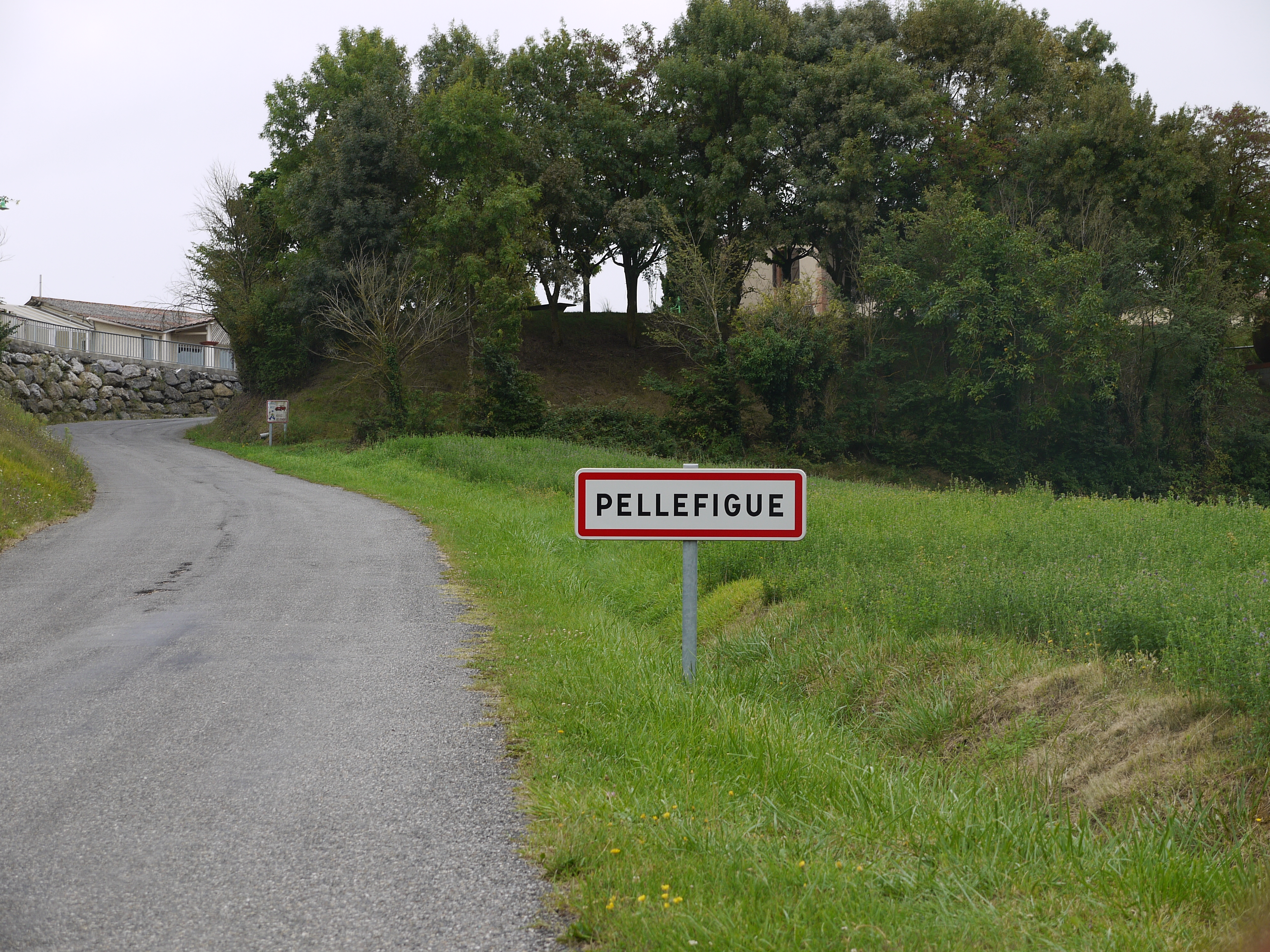
- The road into Pellefigue
- Location of Pellefigue
- Location within France Location within Occitanie
- Coordinates: 43°28′31″N 0°47′37″E
- Country: France
- Region: Occitania
- Department: Gers
- Arrondissement: Auch
- Canton: Val de Save

Government
  - Mayor (2022–2026): Evelyne Bouas
- Area^{1}: 12.81 km^{2} (4.95 sq mi)
- Elevation: 200 m (660 ft)
- Highest elevation: 308 m (1,010 ft)
- Lowest elevation: 182 m (597 ft)
- Population (2023): 103
  - Density: 8.04/km^{2} (20.8/sq mi)
- Time zone: UTC+01:00 (CET)
  - Summer (DST): UTC+02:00 (CEST)
- INSEE/Postal code: 32309 /32420
- ^{1} French Land Register data, which excludes lakes, ponds, glaciers > 1 km^{2} (0.386 sq mi or 247 acres) and river estuaries.

Pellefigue (French pronunciation: [pɛlfiɡ]; Occitan: Pelahiga) is a commune in the Gers department in southwestern France.

== Geography ==
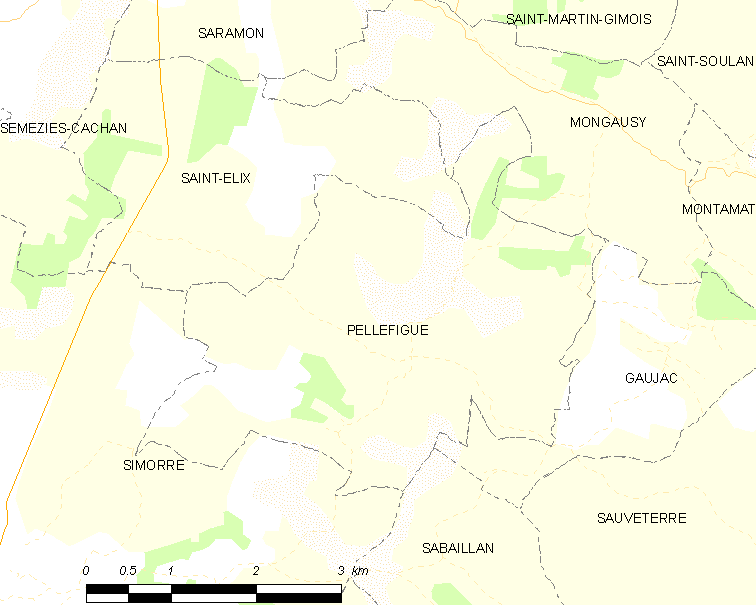
Pellefigue and its surrounding communes

== Population ==
Historical population
Year	Pop.	±% p.a.
1968	183	—
1975	148	−2.99%
1982	129	−1.94%
1990	88	−4.67%
1999	102	+1.65%
2007	118	+1.84%
2012	124	+1.00%
2017	116	−1.32%
2023	103	−1.96%
Source: INSEE

== See also ==
- Communes of the Gers department
