= Montadet =

- Commune
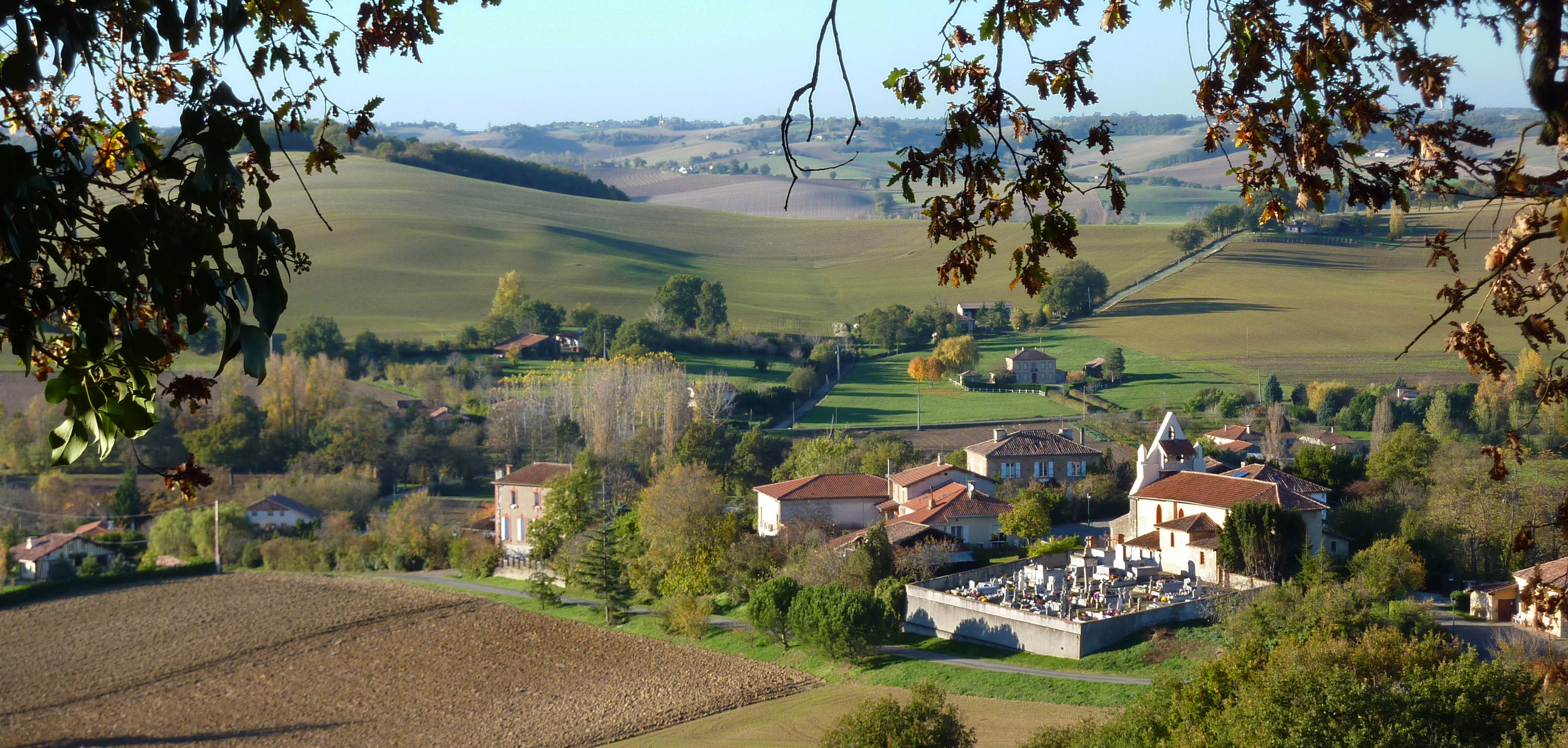
- A general view of Montadet

- Coat of arms
- Location of Montadet
- Location within France Location within Occitanie
- Coordinates: 43°25′58″N 0°54′41″E
- Country: France
- Region: Occitania
- Department: Gers
- Arrondissement: Auch
- Canton: Val de Save

Government
  - Mayor (2020–2026): Pierre Lacomme
- Area^{1}: 5.11 km^{2} (1.97 sq mi)
- Elevation: 250 m (820 ft)
- Highest elevation: 304 m (997 ft)
- Lowest elevation: 174 m (571 ft)
- Population (2023): 66
  - Density: 13/km^{2} (33/sq mi)
- Time zone: UTC+01:00 (CET)
  - Summer (DST): UTC+02:00 (CEST)
- INSEE/Postal code: 32276 /32220
- ^{1} French Land Register data, which excludes lakes, ponds, glaciers > 1 km^{2} (0.386 sq mi or 247 acres) and river estuaries.

Montadet is a commune in the Gers department in southwestern France.

== Geography ==
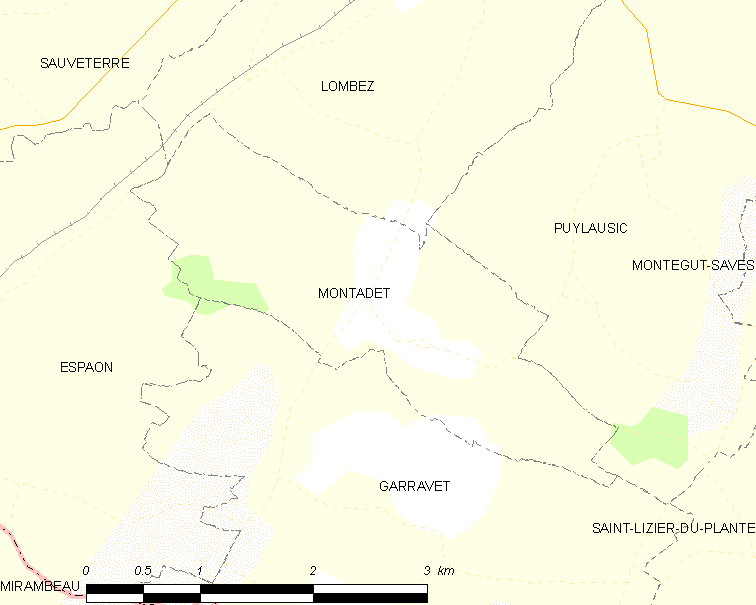
Montadet and its surrounding communes

== Population ==
Historical population
Year	Pop.	±% p.a.
1968	101	—
1975	115	+1.87%
1982	103	−1.56%
1990	98	−0.62%
1999	72	−3.37%
2007	80	+1.33%
2012	80	+0.00%
2017	74	−1.55%
2023	66	−1.89%
Source: INSEE

== See also ==
- Communes of the Gers department
- Savès
