= Pébées =

- Commune
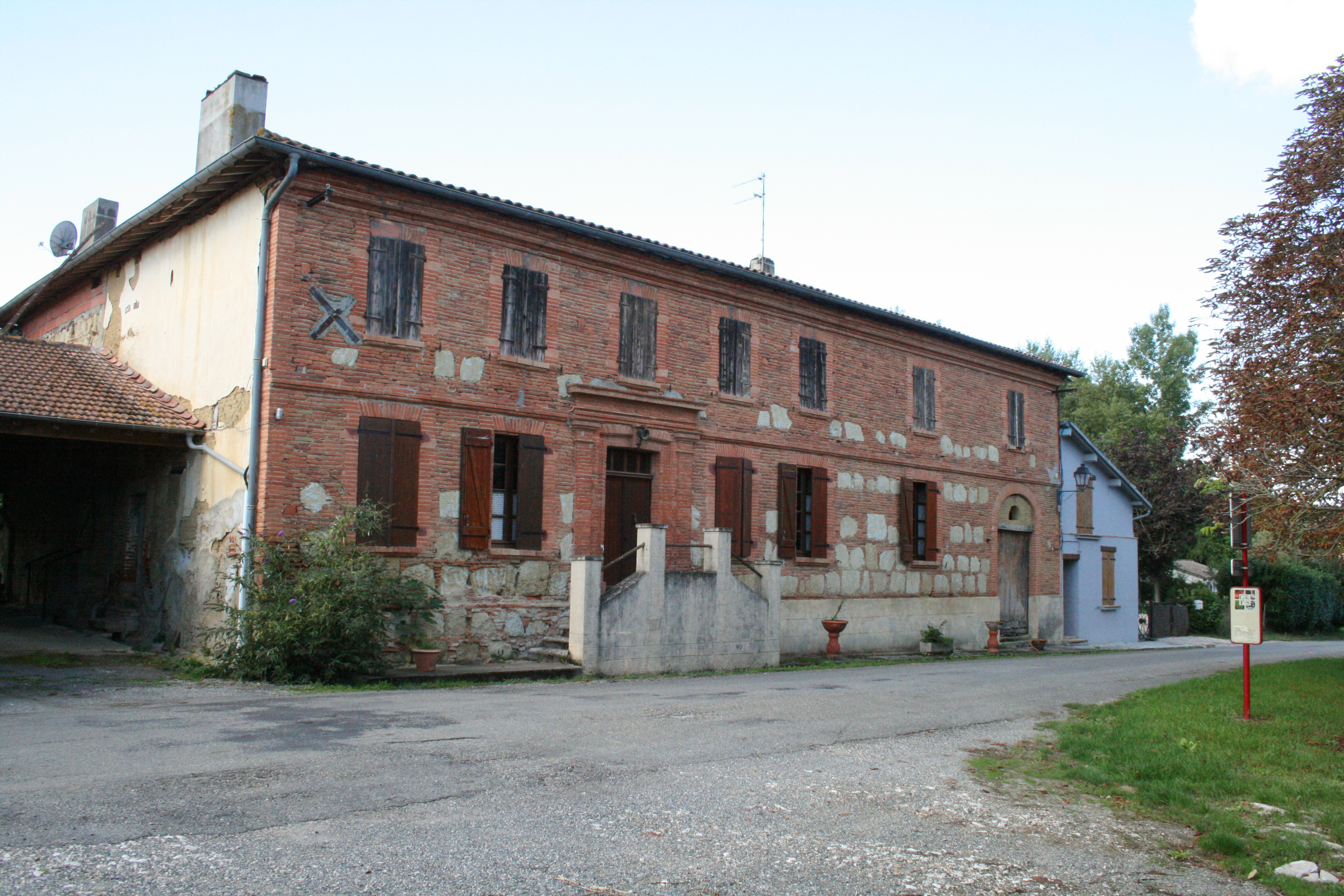
- The communal building in Pébées
- Location of Pébées
- Location within France Location within Occitanie
- Coordinates: 43°27′38″N 1°01′37″E
- Country: France
- Region: Occitania
- Department: Gers
- Arrondissement: Auch
- Canton: Val de Save
- Intercommunality: Savès

Government
  - Mayor (2020–2026): Michel Steffen
- Area^{1}: 4.05 km^{2} (1.56 sq mi)
- Elevation: 205 m (673 ft)
- Highest elevation: 315 m (1,033 ft)
- Lowest elevation: 200 m (660 ft)
- Population (2023): 96
  - Density: 24/km^{2} (61/sq mi)
- Time zone: UTC+01:00 (CET)
  - Summer (DST): UTC+02:00 (CEST)
- INSEE/Postal code: 32308 /32130
- ^{1} French Land Register data, which excludes lakes, ponds, glaciers > 1 km^{2} (0.386 sq mi or 247 acres) and river estuaries.

Pébées (French pronunciation: [pebe]; Occitan: Pebeas) is a commune in the Gers department in southwestern France.

== Geography ==
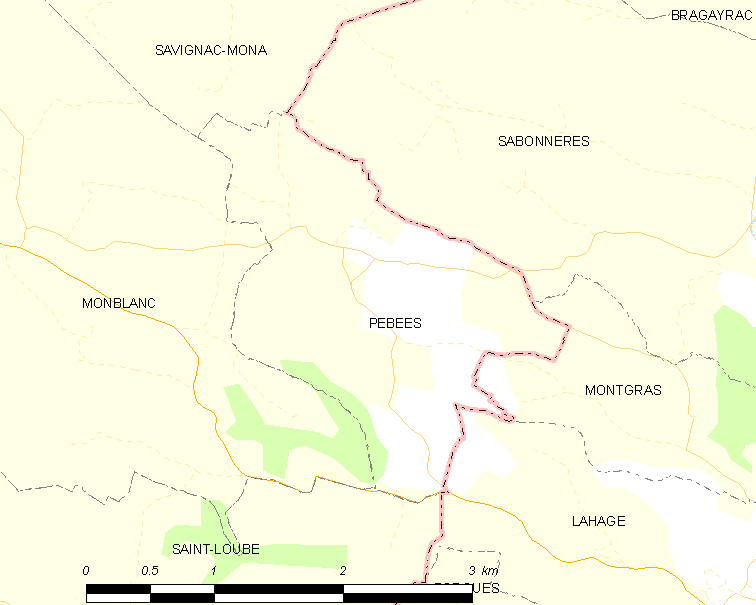
Pébées and its surrounding communes

== Population ==
Historical population
Year	Pop.	±% p.a.
1968	63	—
1975	46	−4.39%
1982	68	+5.74%
1990	66	−0.37%
1999	67	+0.17%
2007	91	+3.90%
2012	93	+0.44%
2017	103	+2.06%
2023	96	−1.17%
Source: INSEE

== See also ==
- Communes of the Gers department
- Savès
