= Montamat =

- Commune
- Location of Montamat
- Location within France Location within Occitanie
- Coordinates: 43°29′11″N 0°50′42″E
- Country: France
- Region: Occitania
- Department: Gers
- Arrondissement: Auch
- Canton: Val de Save
- Intercommunality: Savès

Government
  - Mayor (2020–2026): Sylvain Lauzes
- Area^{1}: 6.6 km^{2} (2.5 sq mi)
- Elevation: 280 m (920 ft)
- Highest elevation: 306 m (1,004 ft)
- Lowest elevation: 185 m (607 ft)
- Population (2023): 105
  - Density: 16/km^{2} (41/sq mi)
- Time zone: UTC+01:00 (CET)
  - Summer (DST): UTC+02:00 (CEST)
- INSEE/Postal code: 32277 /32220
- ^{1} French Land Register data, which excludes lakes, ponds, glaciers > 1 km^{2} (0.386 sq mi or 247 acres) and river estuaries.

Montamat is a commune in the Gers department in southwestern France.

== Geography ==
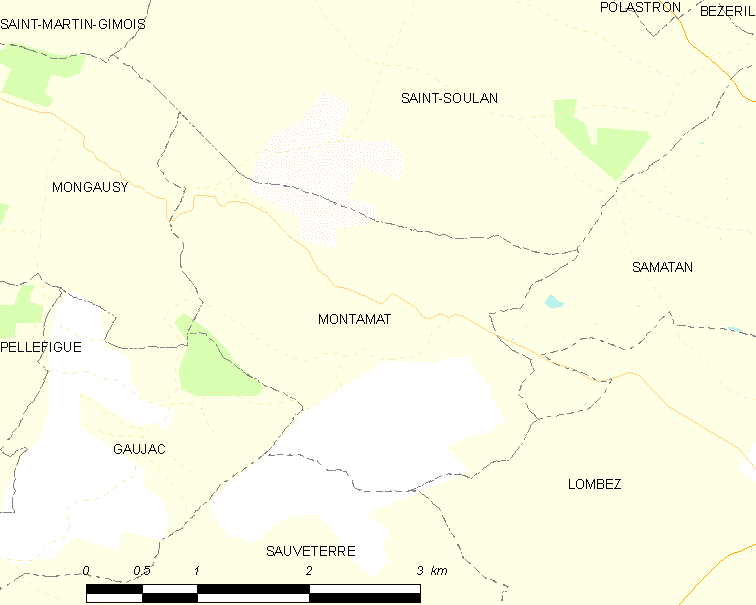
Montamat and its surrounding communes

== Population ==
Historical population
Year	Pop.	±% p.a.
1968	125	—
1975	116	−1.06%
1982	91	−3.41%
1990	87	−0.56%
1999	92	+0.62%
2007	98	+0.79%
2012	128	+5.49%
2017	136	+1.22%
2023	105	−4.22%
Source: INSEE

== See also ==
- Communes of the Gers department
