= Villefranche-d'Astarac =

- Commune
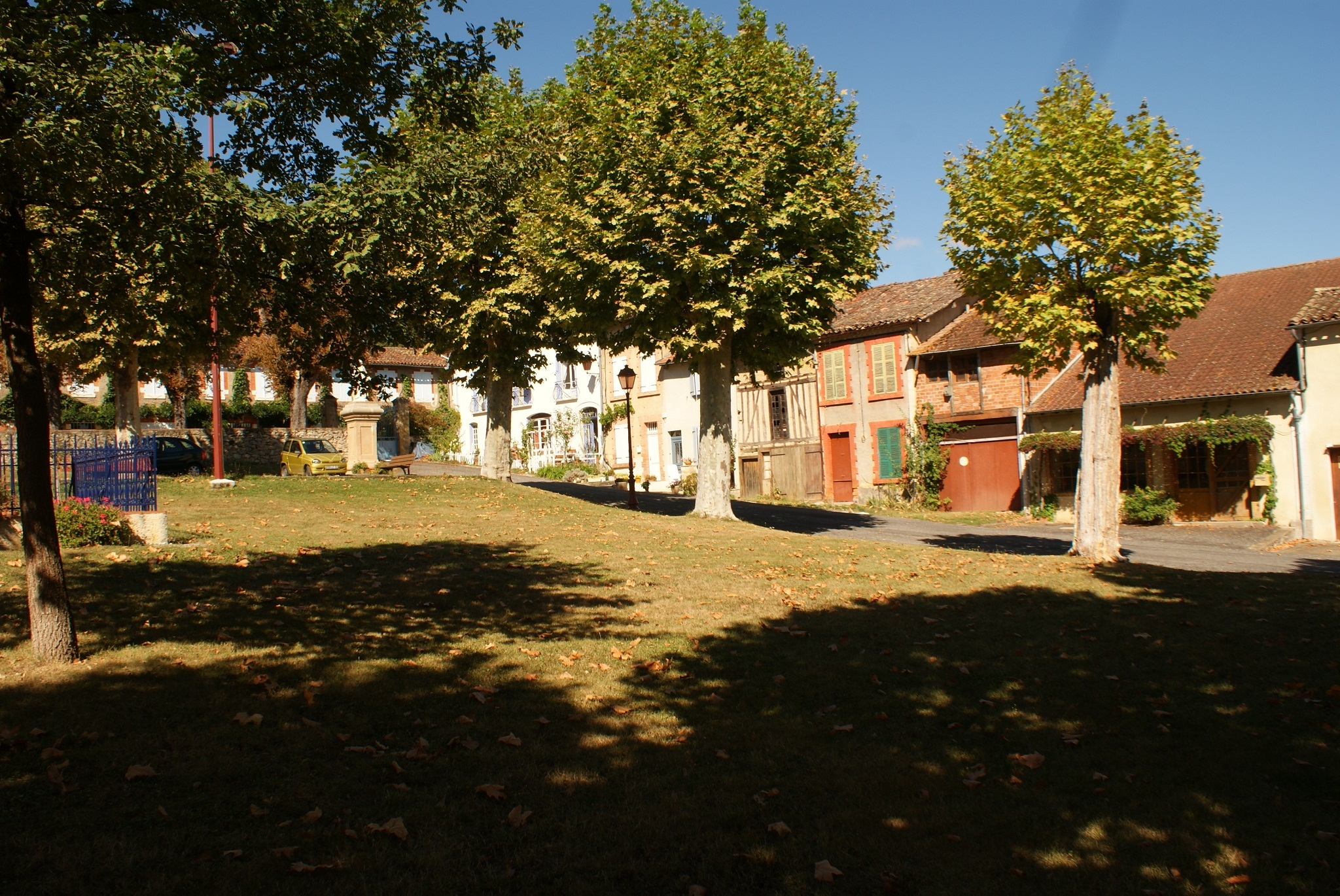
- A view within Villefranche

- Coat of arms
- Location of Villefranche-d'Astarac
- Location within France Location within Occitanie
- Coordinates: 43°25′28″N 0°43′41″E
- Country: France
- Region: Occitania
- Department: Gers
- Arrondissement: Auch
- Canton: Val de Save

Government
  - Mayor (2020–2026): Bernard Monlibos
- Area^{1}: 12.62 km^{2} (4.87 sq mi)
- Elevation: 200 m (660 ft)
- Highest elevation: 311 m (1,020 ft)
- Lowest elevation: 202 m (663 ft)
- Population (2023): 169
  - Density: 13.4/km^{2} (34.7/sq mi)
- Time zone: UTC+01:00 (CET)
  - Summer (DST): UTC+02:00 (CEST)
- INSEE/Postal code: 32465 /32420
- ^{1} French Land Register data, which excludes lakes, ponds, glaciers > 1 km^{2} (0.386 sq mi or 247 acres) and river estuaries.

Villefranche-d'Astarac (French pronunciation: [vilfʁɑ̃ʃ dastaʁak]; before 2023: Villefranche; Gascon: Vilafranca d'Astarac) is a commune in the Gers department in southwestern France.

== Geography ==
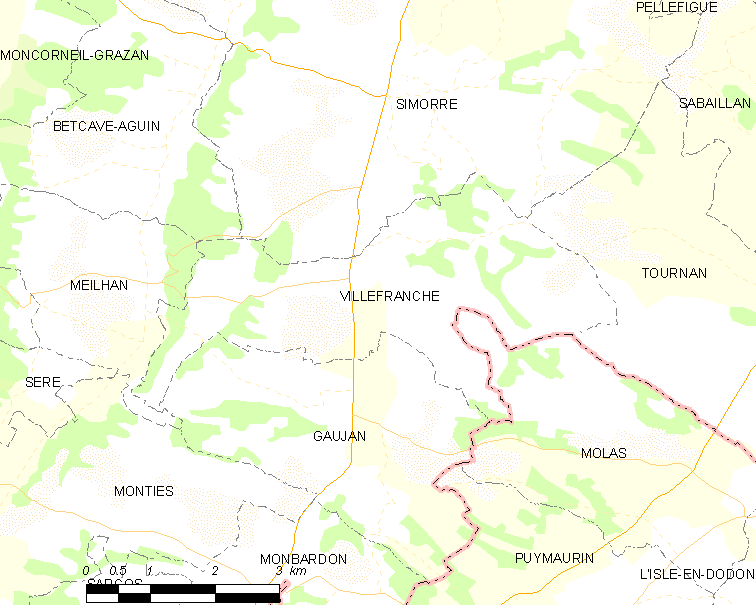
Villefranche and its surrounding communes

== Population ==
Historical population
Year	Pop.	±% p.a.
1968	213	—
1975	180	−2.38%
1982	154	−2.20%
1990	153	−0.08%
1999	138	−1.14%
2007	164	+2.18%
2012	168	+0.48%
2017	128	−5.29%
2023	169	+4.74%
Source: INSEE

== See also ==
- Communes of the Gers department
