= Saint-Élix-d'Astarac =

- Commune
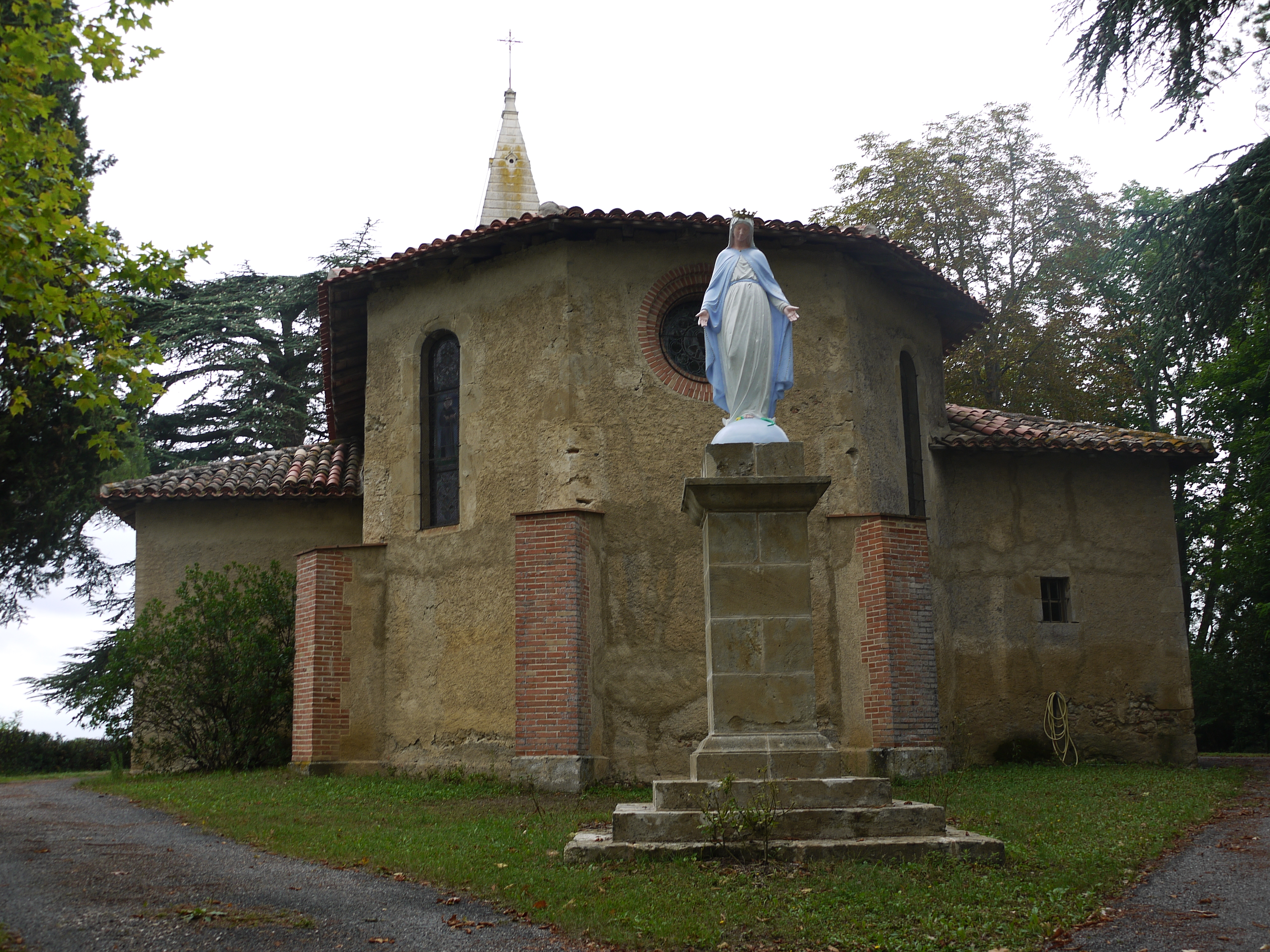
- The church in Saint-Élix-d'Astarac
- Location of Saint-Élix-d'Astarac
- Location within France Location within Occitanie
- Coordinates: 43°29′37″N 0°46′28″E
- Country: France
- Region: Occitania
- Department: Gers
- Arrondissement: Auch
- Canton: Val de Save
- Intercommunality: Coteaux Arrats Gimone

Government
  - Mayor (2020–2026): Christophe Vicedo
- Area^{1}: 8.17 km^{2} (3.15 sq mi)
- Highest elevation: 291 m (955 ft)
- Lowest elevation: 177 m (581 ft)
- Population (2023): 187
  - Density: 22.9/km^{2} (59.3/sq mi)
- Time zone: UTC+01:00 (CET)
  - Summer (DST): UTC+02:00 (CEST)
- INSEE/Postal code: 32374 /32450
- ^{1} French Land Register data, which excludes lakes, ponds, glaciers > 1 km^{2} (0.386 sq mi or 247 acres) and river estuaries.

Saint-Élix-d'Astarac (before 2017: Saint-Élix) is a commune in the Gers department in southwestern France.

== Geography ==
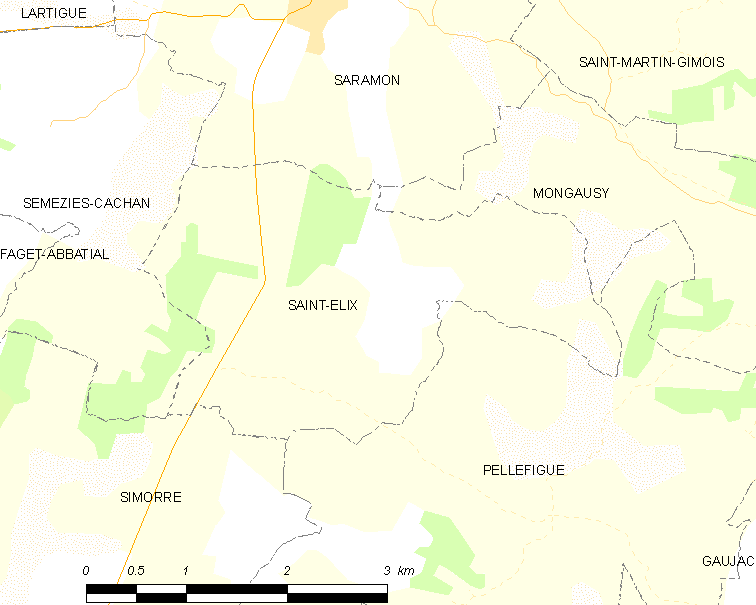
Saint-Élix-d'Astarac and its surrounding communes

== Population ==
Historical population
| Year | Pop. | ±% p.a. |
|---|---|---|
| 1968 | 155 | — |
| 1975 | 135 | −1.95% |
| 1982 | 122 | −1.44% |
| 1990 | 112 | −1.06% |
| 1999 | 122 | +0.95% |
| 2007 | 179 | +4.91% |
| 2012 | 193 | +1.52% |
| 2017 | 189 | −0.42% |
| 2023 | 187 | −0.18% |
Source: INSEE

== See also ==
- Communes of the Gers department
