= François Bourgade =

French missionary and philosopher

François Bourgade (7 July 1806 in Gaujan – 21 May 1866 in Paris) was a French missionary and philosopher. He was one of the first French missionaries to Muslim North Africa, serving in present-day Algeria and Tunisia.

Bourgade pursued his theological studies at the seminary of Auch and was ordained priest in 1832. His immediate request to be authorized to work among the infidels of Africa was granted only in 1838. He proceeded to Algeria and, after ministering for some time in the hospitals of this colony, passed over to the regency of Tunis, where he founded a hospital and several schools. He also founded a small museum focusing on Punic history. He was put in charge of the chapel which Louis Philippe (1830–1848) had erected on the spot where St. Louis died, and he received several decorations, among them the Legion of Honour.

While in Algiers, he worked closely with Bishop Antoine-Louis-Adolphe Dupuch, as well as the Sisters of Saint-Joseph de l’Apparition.

His work in multi-cultural schools and mediating between the locals and the French army led to his being sent back to France in 1858, where he later died.

== Works ==
Bourgade's writings were mostly intended to proselytize to Muslims. They included:

- La Clef Du Coran (1852), faisant suite aux Soirées De Carthage (1847), reprinted by the Nabu Press (2010) ISBN 1-1462-3352-3
- Passage du Coran (1855)
- La Toison d'Or de la Langue Phénicienne (1852, 1856)
- Lettre à M. E. Renan à l’Occasion de Son Ouvrage Intitulé Vie de Jésus, Martin-Beaupré Frères (1864)
