= Laymont =

- Commune
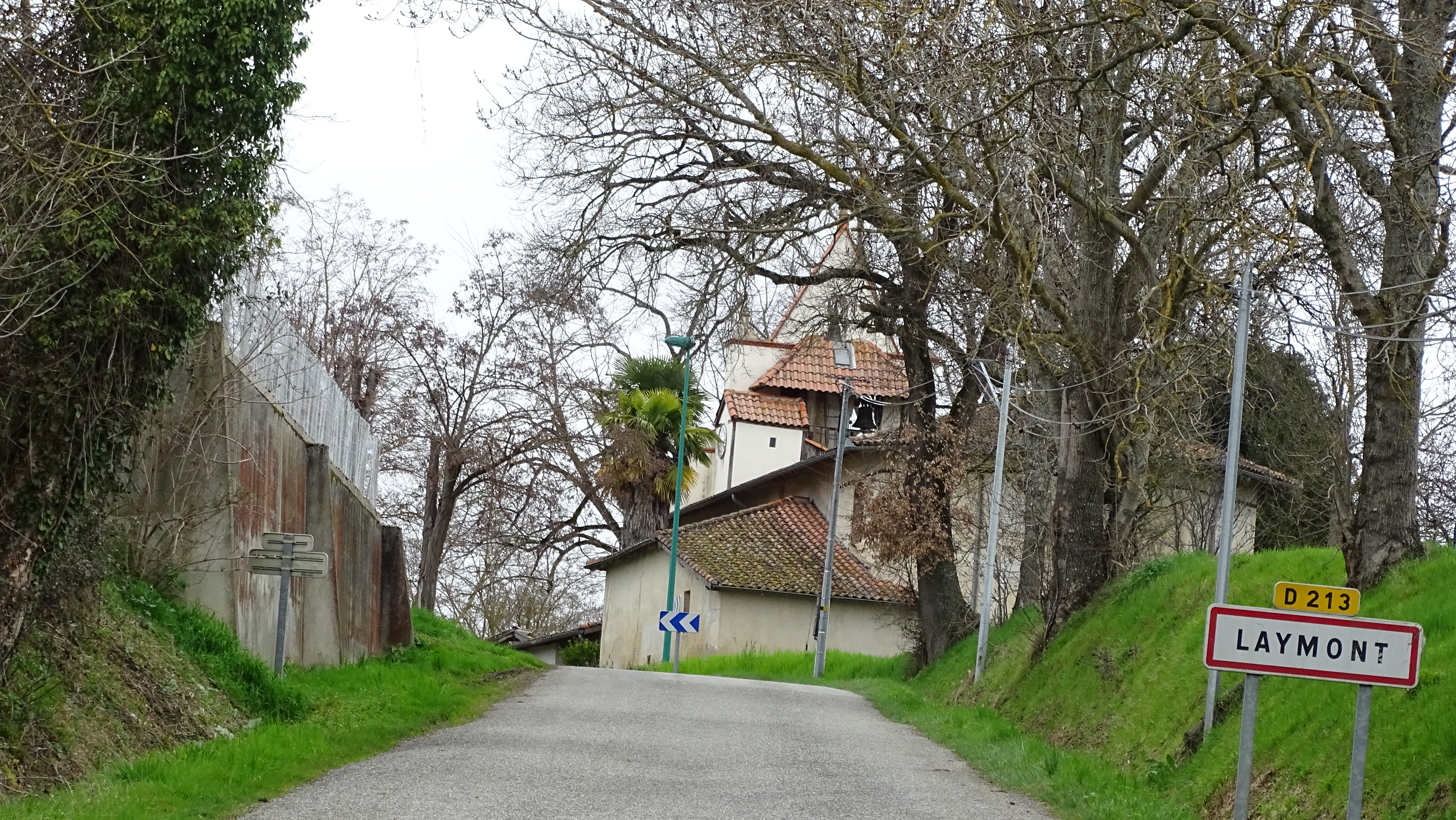
- The road into Laymont
- Location of Laymont
- Location within France Location within Occitanie
- Coordinates: 43°25′25″N 0°59′15″E
- Country: France
- Region: Occitania
- Department: Gers
- Arrondissement: Auch
- Canton: Val de Save
- Intercommunality: Savès

Government
  - Mayor (2020–2026): Fabien Escalas
- Area^{1}: 11.05 km^{2} (4.27 sq mi)
- Elevation: 250 m (820 ft)
- Highest elevation: 315 m (1,033 ft)
- Lowest elevation: 190 m (620 ft)
- Population (2023): 232
  - Density: 21.0/km^{2} (54.4/sq mi)
- Time zone: UTC+01:00 (CET)
  - Summer (DST): UTC+02:00 (CEST)
- INSEE/Postal code: 32206 /32220
- ^{1} French Land Register data, which excludes lakes, ponds, glaciers > 1 km^{2} (0.386 sq mi or 247 acres) and river estuaries.

Laymont (French pronunciation: [lɛmɔ̃]; Occitan: Laimont) is a commune in the Gers department in southwestern France.

== Geography ==
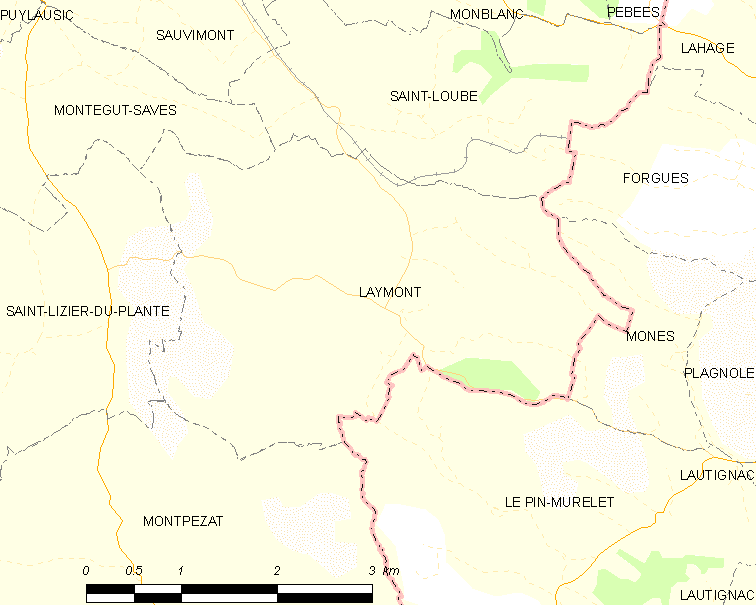
Laymont and its surrounding communes

== Population ==
Historical population
Year	Pop.	±% p.a.
1968	254	—
1975	218	−2.16%
1982	210	−0.53%
1990	199	−0.67%
1999	216	+0.91%
2007	202	−0.83%
2012	200	−0.20%
2017	210	+0.98%
2023	232	+1.67%
Source: INSEE

== See also ==
- Communes of the Gers department
- Savès
