= Bézéril =

- Commune
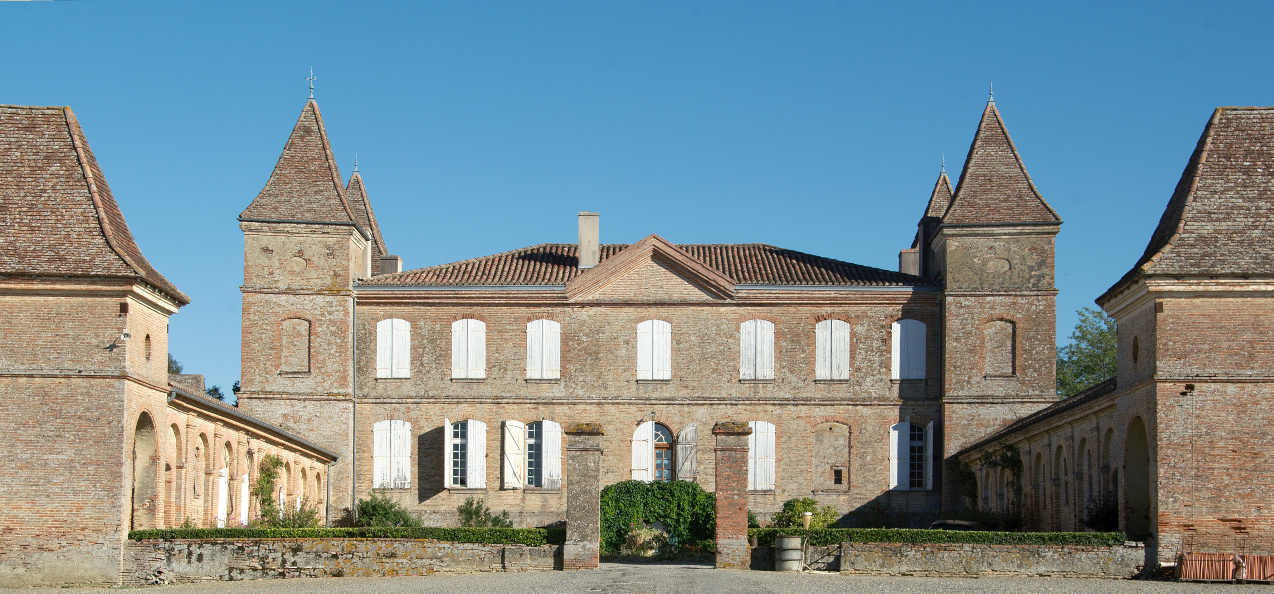
- The Château
- Location of Bézéril
- Location within France Location within Occitanie
- Coordinates: 43°32′40″N 0°52′43″E
- Country: France
- Region: Occitania
- Department: Gers
- Arrondissement: Auch
- Canton: Val de Save
- Intercommunality: Savès

Government
  - Mayor (2020–2026): Christian Daignan
- Area^{1}: 9.65 km^{2} (3.73 sq mi)
- Elevation: 234 m (768 ft)
- Highest elevation: 272 m (892 ft)
- Lowest elevation: 172 m (564 ft)
- Population (2023): 105
  - Density: 10.9/km^{2} (28.2/sq mi)
- Time zone: UTC+01:00 (CET)
  - Summer (DST): UTC+02:00 (CEST)
- INSEE/Postal code: 32051 /32130
- ^{1} French Land Register data, which excludes lakes, ponds, glaciers > 1 km^{2} (0.386 sq mi or 247 acres) and river estuaries.

Bézéril (French pronunciation: [bezeʁil]; Occitan: Beserilh) is a commune in the Gers department in southwestern France.

== Geography ==
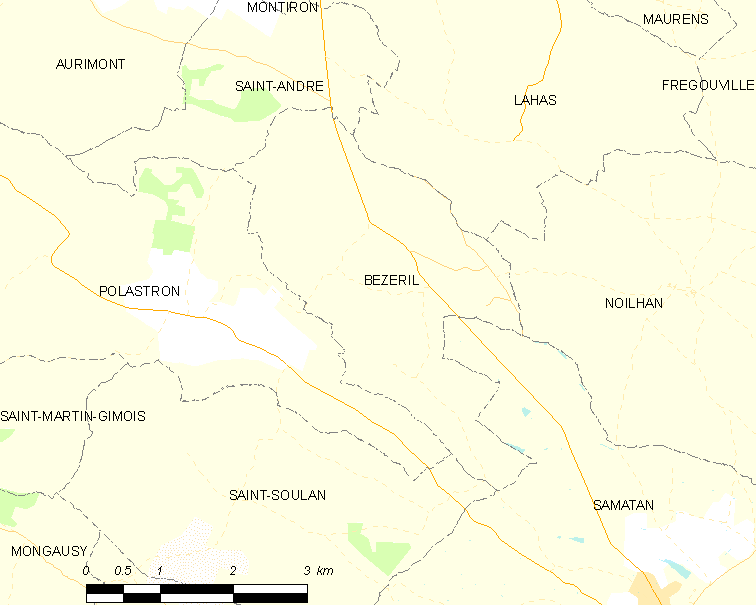
Bézéril and its surrounding communes

== Population ==
Historical population
Year	Pop.	±% p.a.
1968	123	—
1975	113	−1.20%
1982	113	+0.00%
1990	107	−0.68%
1999	92	−1.66%
2007	101	+1.17%
2012	124	+4.19%
2017	128	+0.64%
2023	105	−3.25%
Source: INSEE

== See also ==
- Communes of the Gers department
