= Saint-Lizier-du-Planté =

- Commune
- Location of Saint-Lizier-du-Planté
- Location within France Location within Occitanie
- Coordinates: 43°24′53″N 0°57′05″E
- Country: France
- Region: Occitania
- Department: Gers
- Arrondissement: Auch
- Canton: Val de Save
- Intercommunality: Savès

Government
  - Mayor (2020–2026): Raymonde Dambielle
- Area^{1}: 10.49 km^{2} (4.05 sq mi)
- Highest elevation: 301 m (988 ft)
- Lowest elevation: 181 m (594 ft)
- Population (2023): 148
  - Density: 14.1/km^{2} (36.5/sq mi)
- Time zone: UTC+01:00 (CET)
  - Summer (DST): UTC+02:00 (CEST)
- INSEE/Postal code: 32386 /32220
- ^{1} French Land Register data, which excludes lakes, ponds, glaciers > 1 km^{2} (0.386 sq mi or 247 acres) and river estuaries.

Saint-Lizier-du-Planté (French pronunciation: [sɛ̃ lizje dy plɑ̃te]; Gascon: Sent Lisièr deu Plantèr) is a commune in the Gers department in southwestern France.

== Geography ==
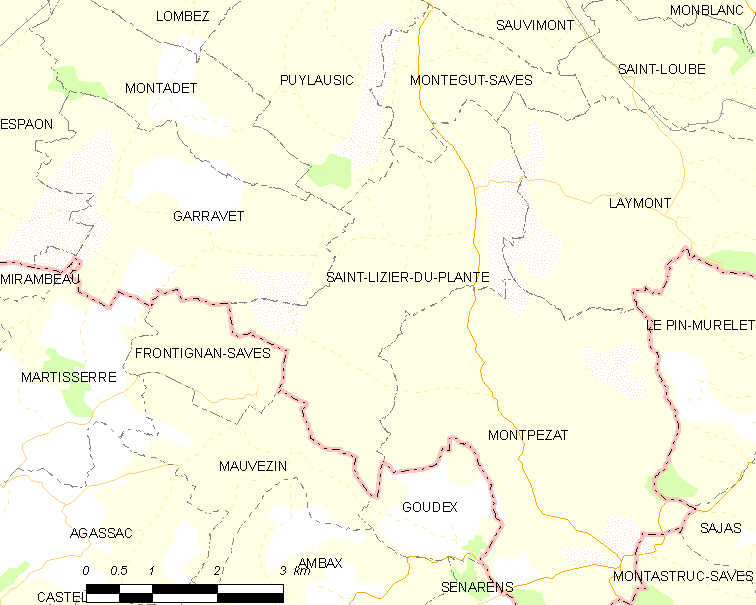
Saint-Lizier-du-Planté and its surrounding communes

== Population ==
Historical population
Year	Pop.	±% p.a.
1968	152	—
1975	131	−2.10%
1982	112	−2.21%
1990	120	+0.87%
1999	112	−0.76%
2007	119	+0.76%
2012	124	+0.83%
2017	138	+2.16%
2023	148	+1.17%
Source: INSEE

== See also ==
- Communes of the Gers department
- Savès
