= Bourgade =

Bourgade is a French-language surname meaning "small village whose houses are more scattered than in town". Notable people with the surname include:

- François Bourgade (1806–1866), French missionary and philosopher
- Peter Bourgade (1845–1908)
