= Garravet =

- Commune
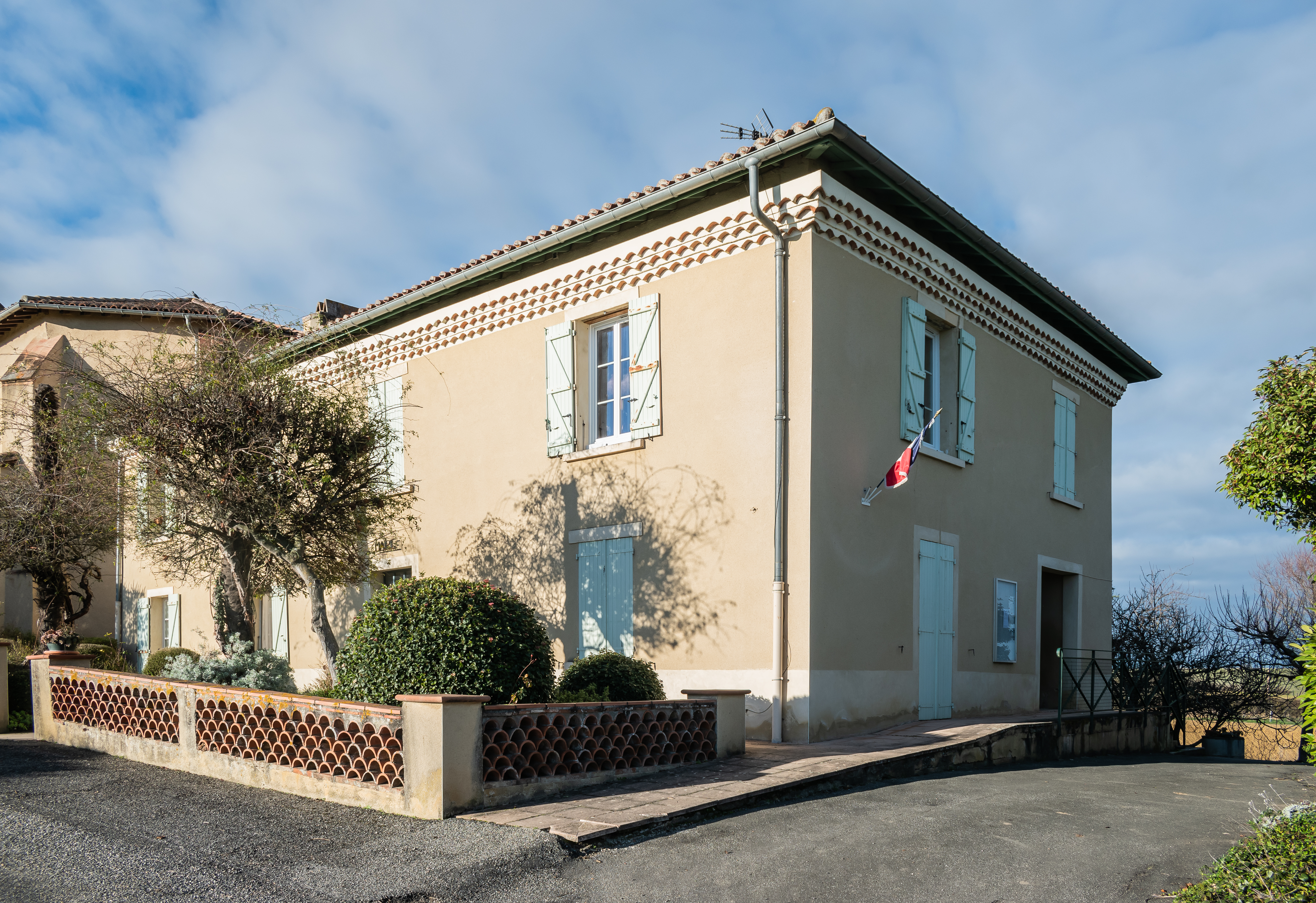
- Location of Garravet
- Location within France Location within Occitanie
- Coordinates: 43°24′53″N 0°54′51″E
- Country: France
- Region: Occitania
- Department: Gers
- Arrondissement: Auch
- Canton: Val de Save

Government
  - Mayor (2020–2026): Daniel Worzniack
- Area^{1}: 9.09 km^{2} (3.51 sq mi)
- Elevation: 304 m (997 ft)
- Highest elevation: 310 m (1,020 ft)
- Lowest elevation: 183 m (600 ft)
- Population (2023): 146
  - Density: 16.1/km^{2} (41.6/sq mi)
- Time zone: UTC+01:00 (CET)
  - Summer (DST): UTC+02:00 (CEST)
- INSEE/Postal code: 32138 /32220
- ^{1} French Land Register data, which excludes lakes, ponds, glaciers > 1 km^{2} (0.386 sq mi or 247 acres) and river estuaries.

Garravet (French pronunciation: [ɡaʁavɛ]) is a commune in the Gers department in southwestern France.

== Geography ==
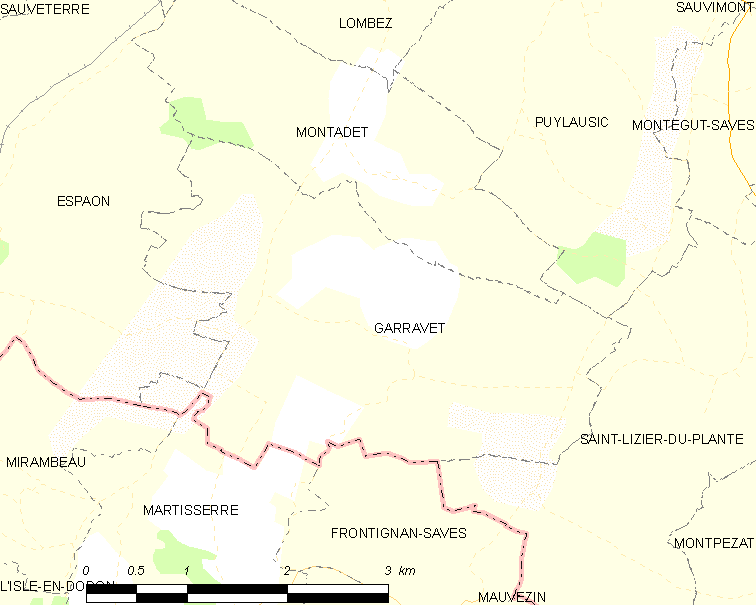
Garravet and its surrounding communes

== Population ==
Historical population
Year	Pop.	±% p.a.
1968	217	—
1975	191	−1.81%
1982	155	−2.94%
1990	138	−1.44%
1999	121	−1.45%
2007	138	+1.66%
2012	141	+0.43%
2017	157	+2.17%
2023	146	−1.20%
Source: INSEE

== See also ==
- Communes of the Gers department
- Savès
