= Betcave-Aguin =

- Commune
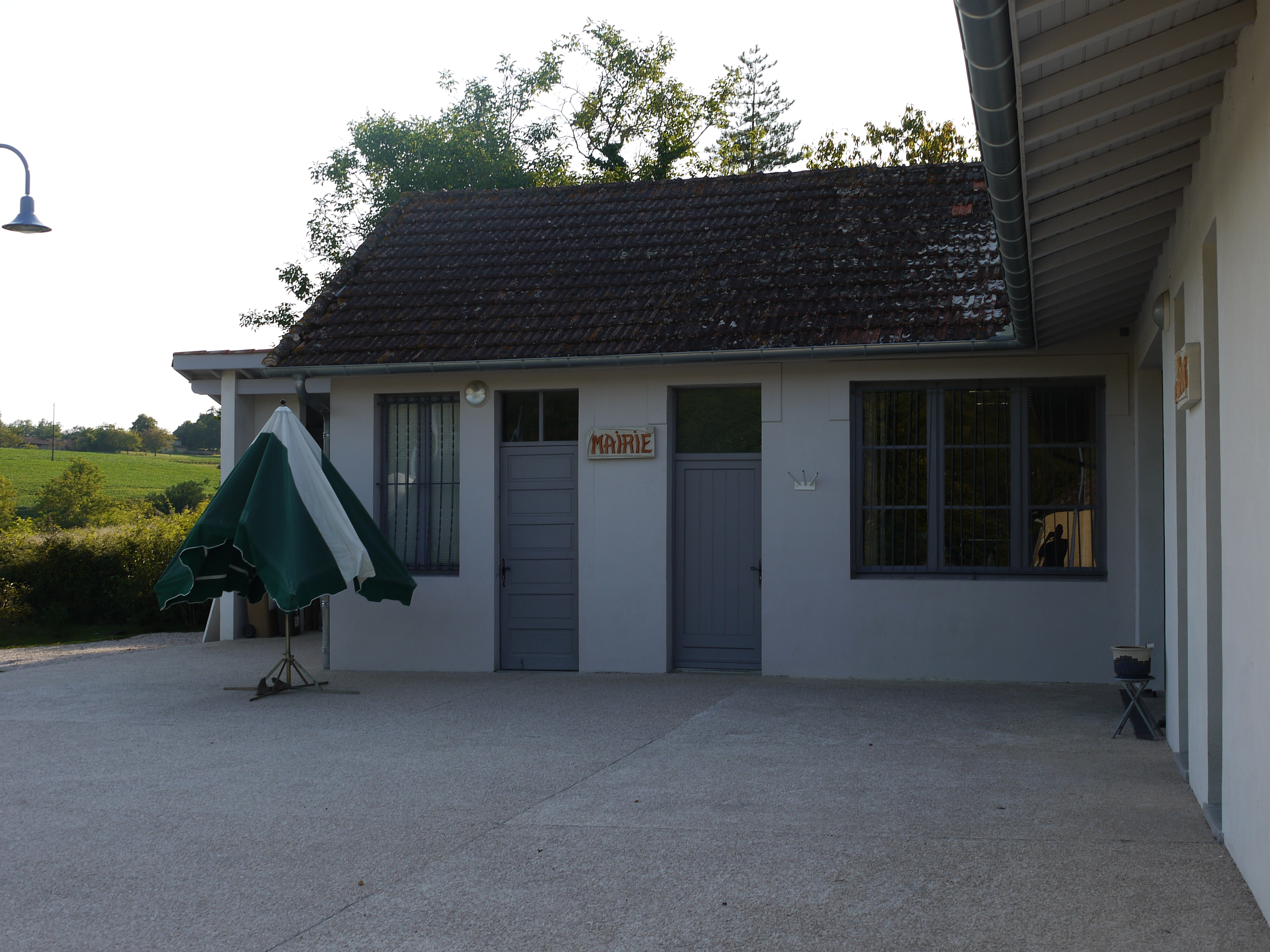
- The town hall in Betcave-Aguin
- Location of Betcave-Aguin
- Location within France Location within Occitanie
- Coordinates: 43°26′33″N 0°41′32″E
- Country: France
- Region: Occitania
- Department: Gers
- Arrondissement: Auch
- Canton: Val de Save

Government
  - Mayor (2020–2026): Jacques Serin
- Area^{1}: 10.19 km^{2} (3.93 sq mi)
- Elevation: 200 m (660 ft)
- Highest elevation: 314 m (1,030 ft)
- Lowest elevation: 213 m (699 ft)
- Population (2023): 92
  - Density: 9.0/km^{2} (23/sq mi)
- Time zone: UTC+01:00 (CET)
  - Summer (DST): UTC+02:00 (CEST)
- INSEE/Postal code: 32048 /32420
- ^{1} French Land Register data, which excludes lakes, ponds, glaciers > 1 km^{2} (0.386 sq mi or 247 acres) and river estuaries.

Betcave-Aguin (French pronunciation: [bɛtkav aɡɛ̃]; Occitan: Vathcava e Aguin) is a commune in the Gers department in southwestern France.

== Geography ==
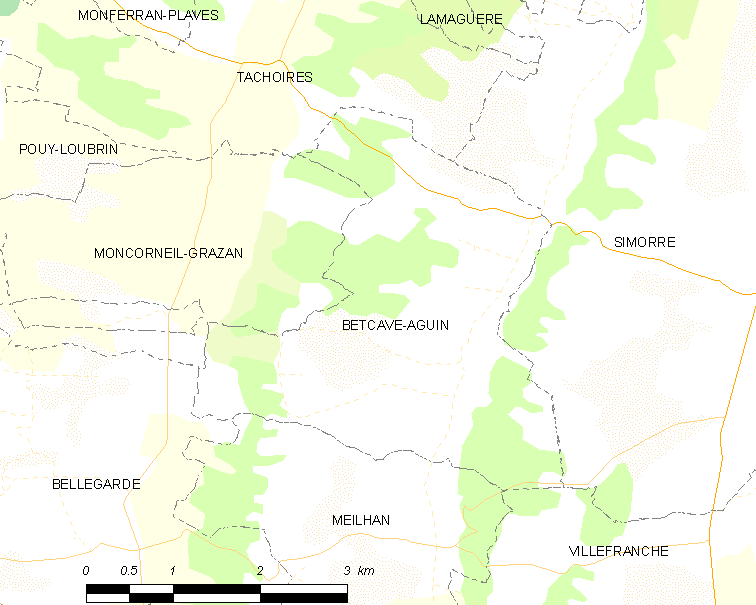
Betcave-Aguin and its surrounding communes

== Population ==
Historical population
Year	Pop.	±% p.a.
1968	92	—
1975	81	−1.80%
1982	73	−1.47%
1990	88	+2.36%
1999	80	−1.05%
2007	103	+3.21%
2012	93	−2.02%
2017	85	−1.78%
2023	92	+1.33%
Source: INSEE

== See also ==
- Communes of the Gers department
