= Saint-André, Gers =

Saint-André
- Commune
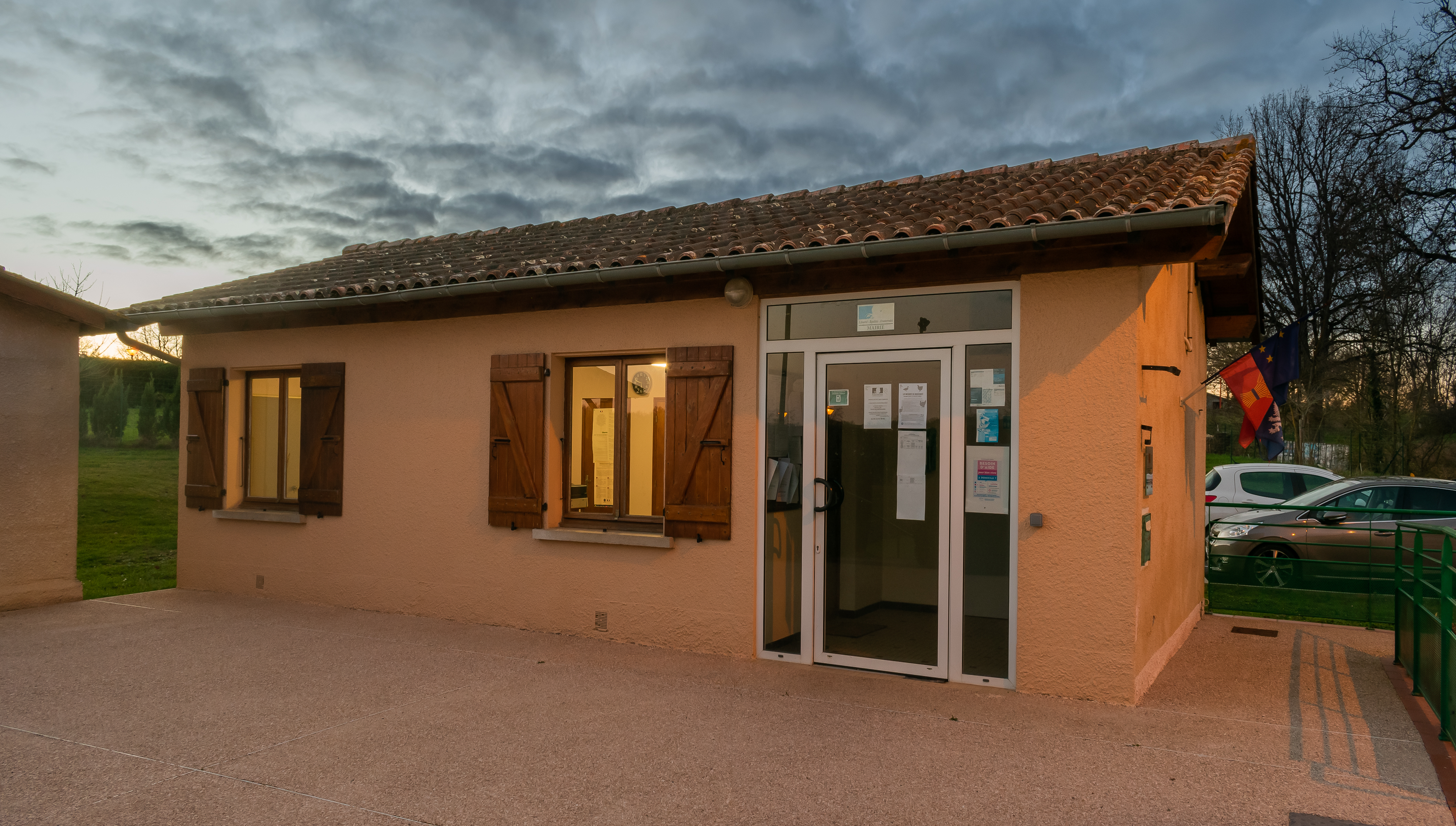
- Location of Saint-André
- Location within France Location within Occitanie
- Coordinates: 43°33′48″N 0°51′25″E
- Country: France
- Region: Occitania
- Department: Gers
- Arrondissement: Auch
- Canton: Val de Save
- Intercommunality: Savès

Government
  - Mayor (2020–2026): Gérard Délieux
- Area^{1}: 5.58 km^{2} (2.15 sq mi)
- Elevation: 184 m (604 ft)
- Highest elevation: 246 m (807 ft)
- Lowest elevation: 175 m (574 ft)
- Population (2023): 124
  - Density: 22.2/km^{2} (57.6/sq mi)
- Time zone: UTC+01:00 (CET)
  - Summer (DST): UTC+02:00 (CEST)
- INSEE/Postal code: 32356 /32200
- ^{1} French Land Register data, which excludes lakes, ponds, glaciers > 1 km^{2} (0.386 sq mi or 247 acres) and river estuaries.

Saint-André (French pronunciation: [sɛ̃.t‿ɑ̃dʁe]; Occitan: Sent Andreu) is a commune in the Gers Department in southwestern France.

== Geography ==
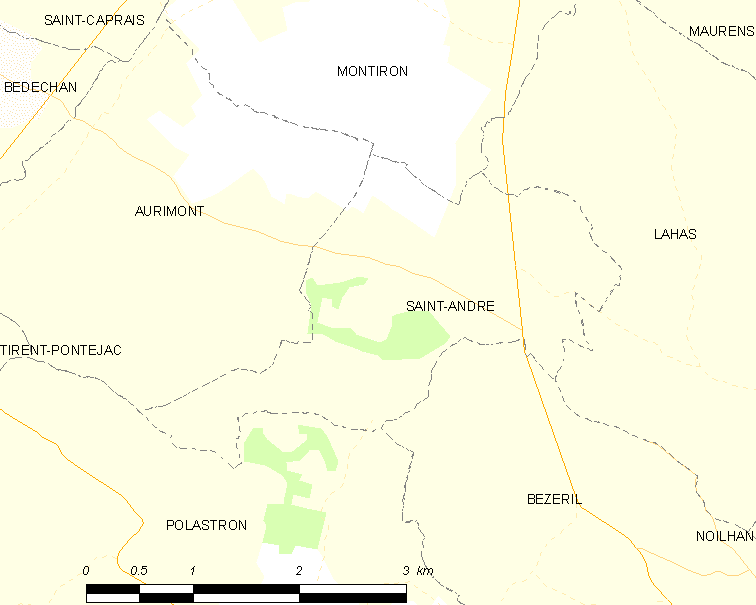
Saint-André and its surrounding communes

== Population ==
Historical population
Year	Pop.	±% p.a.
1968	101	—
1975	98	−0.43%
1982	92	−0.90%
1990	95	+0.40%
1999	76	−2.45%
2007	88	+1.85%
2012	107	+3.99%
2017	123	+2.83%
2023	124	+0.14%
Source: INSEE

== See also ==
- Communes of the Gers department
