= Puylausic =

- Commune
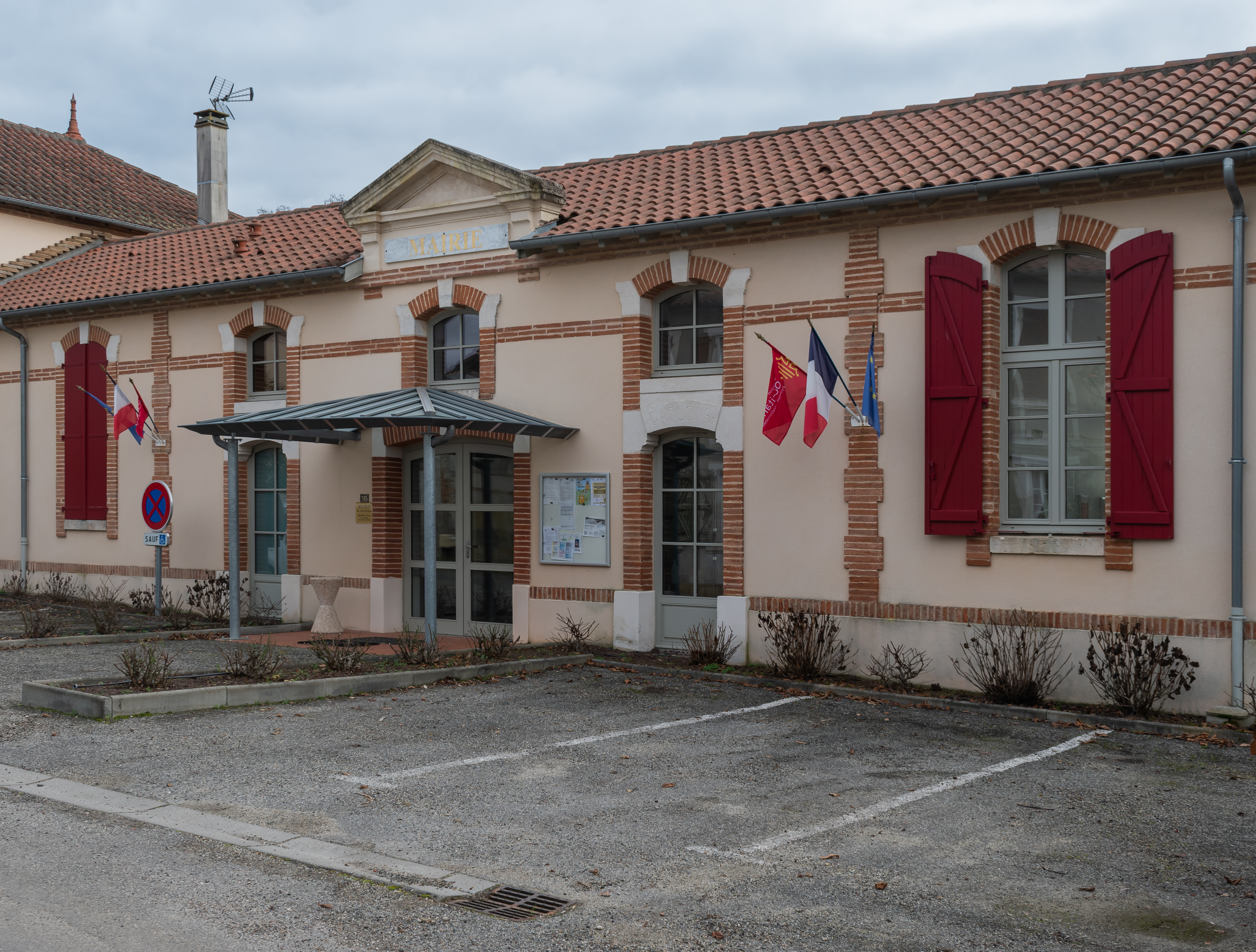
- Location of Puylausic
- Location within France Location within Occitanie
- Coordinates: 43°26′57″N 0°55′56″E
- Country: France
- Region: Occitania
- Department: Gers
- Arrondissement: Auch
- Canton: Val de Save

Government
  - Mayor (2020–2026): Bernard Beyria
- Area^{1}: 9.84 km^{2} (3.80 sq mi)
- Elevation: 268 m (879 ft)
- Highest elevation: 295 m (968 ft)
- Lowest elevation: 171 m (561 ft)
- Population (2023): 165
  - Density: 16.8/km^{2} (43.4/sq mi)
- Time zone: UTC+01:00 (CET)
  - Summer (DST): UTC+02:00 (CEST)
- INSEE/Postal code: 32336 /32220
- ^{1} French Land Register data, which excludes lakes, ponds, glaciers > 1 km^{2} (0.386 sq mi or 247 acres) and river estuaries.

Puylausic (French pronunciation: [pɥilozik]; Occitan: Poilausic) is a commune in the Gers department in southwestern France.

== Population ==
Historical population
Year	Pop.	±% p.a.
1968	212	—
1975	193	−1.33%
1982	181	−0.91%
1990	199	+1.19%
1999	158	−2.53%
2007	196	+2.73%
2012	179	−1.80%
2017	163	−1.86%
2023	165	+0.20%
Source: INSEE

== See also ==
- Communes of the Gers department
- Savès
