= Labastide-Savès =

Labastide-Savès La Bastida de Savés (Occitan)
- Commune
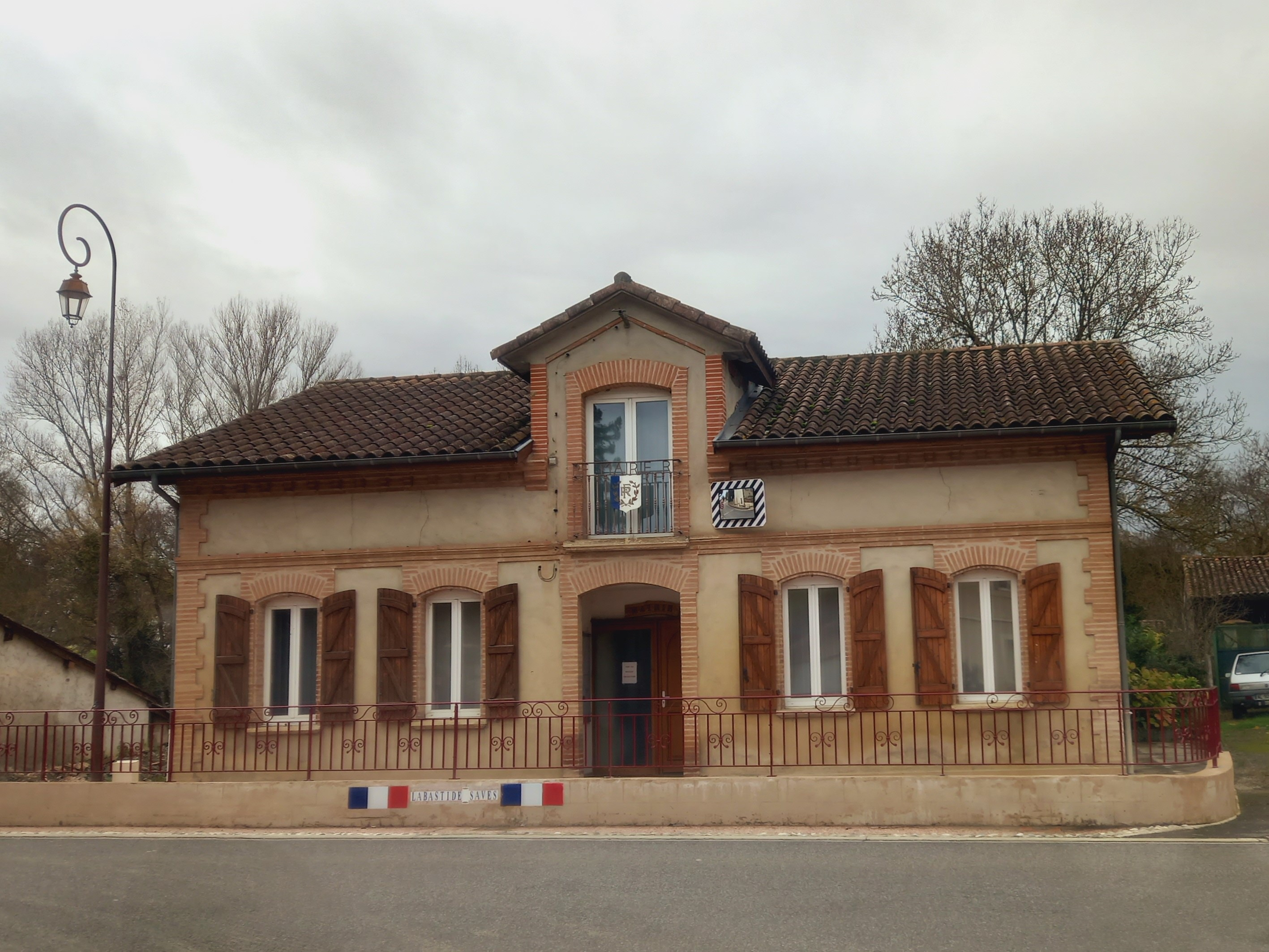
- Labastide-Savès Town Hall
- Location of Labastide-Savès
- Location within France Location within Occitanie
- Coordinates: 43°31′14″N 0°58′54″E
- Country: France
- Region: Occitania
- Department: Gers
- Arrondissement: Auch
- Canton: Val de Save

Government
  - Mayor (2020–2026): Thierry Reveil
- Area^{1}: 3.62 km^{2} (1.40 sq mi)
- Elevation: 162 m (531 ft)
- Highest elevation: 220 m (720 ft)
- Lowest elevation: 153 m (502 ft)
- Population (2023): 193
  - Density: 53.3/km^{2} (138/sq mi)
- Time zone: UTC+01:00 (CET)
  - Summer (DST): UTC+02:00 (CEST)
- INSEE/Postal code: 32171 /32130
- ^{1} French Land Register data, which excludes lakes, ponds, glaciers > 1 km^{2} (0.386 sq mi or 247 acres) and river estuaries.

Labastide-Savès (French pronunciation: [labastid savɛs]; Occitan: La Bastida de Savés) is a commune in the Gers department in the Occitania region in Southwestern France.

== Geography ==
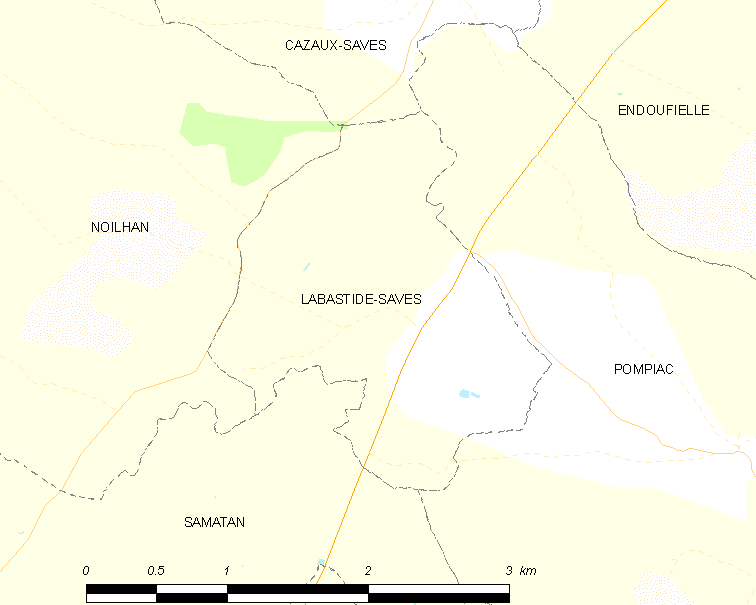
Labastide-Savès and its surrounding communes

== Demographics ==
Historical population
Year	Pop.	±% p.a.
1968	128	—
1975	144	+1.70%
1982	112	−3.53%
1990	116	+0.44%
1999	117	+0.10%
2007	135	+1.80%
2012	143	+1.16%
2017	174	+4.00%
2023	193	+1.74%
Source: INSEE

== See also ==
- Communes of the Gers department
