= Lahas =

- Commune
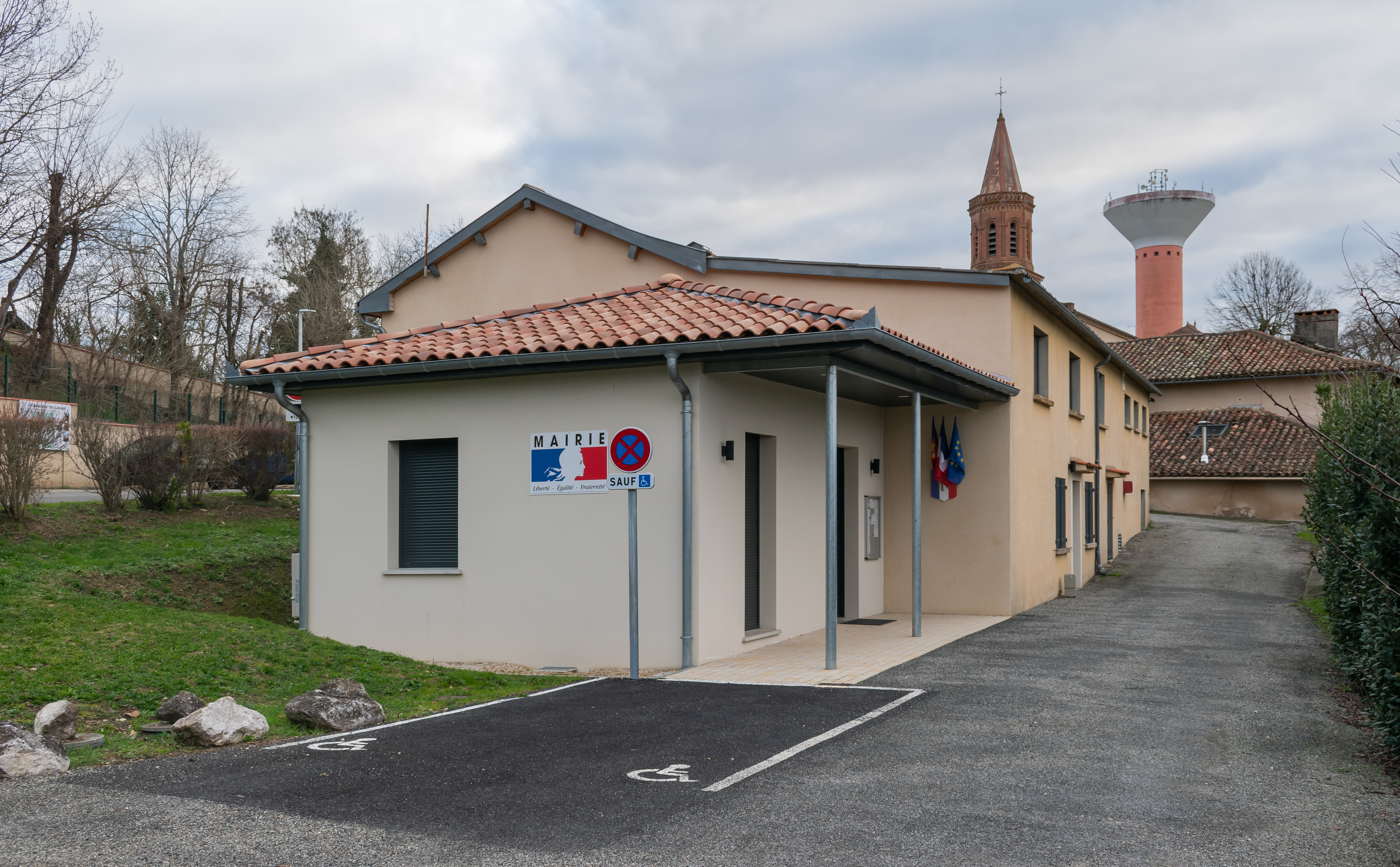

- Coat of arms
- Location of Lahas
- Location within France Location within Occitanie
- Coordinates: 43°33′20″N 0°53′33″E
- Country: France
- Region: Occitania
- Department: Gers
- Arrondissement: Auch
- Canton: Val de Save

Government
  - Mayor (2020–2026): Pierre Danos
- Area^{1}: 14.54 km^{2} (5.61 sq mi)
- Elevation: 276 m (906 ft)
- Highest elevation: 281 m (922 ft)
- Lowest elevation: 166 m (545 ft)
- Population (2023): 181
  - Density: 12.4/km^{2} (32.2/sq mi)
- Time zone: UTC+01:00 (CET)
  - Summer (DST): UTC+02:00 (CEST)
- INSEE/Postal code: 32182 /32130
- ^{1} French Land Register data, which excludes lakes, ponds, glaciers > 1 km^{2} (0.386 sq mi or 247 acres) and river estuaries.

Lahas (French pronunciation: [la.as]; Occitan: Lahàs) is a commune in the Gers department in southwestern France.

== Geography ==
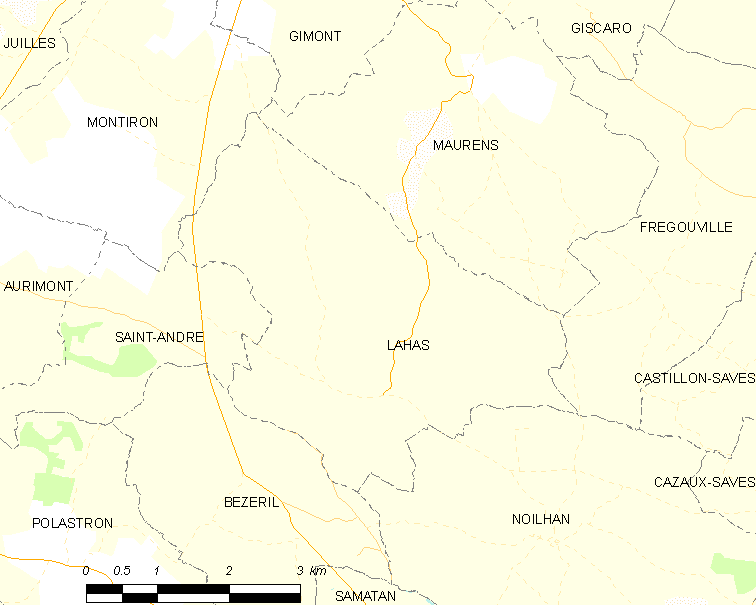
Lahas and its surrounding communes

== Population ==
Historical population
Year	Pop.	±% p.a.
1968	260	—
1975	211	−2.94%
1982	187	−1.71%
1990	188	+0.07%
1999	154	−2.19%
2007	176	+1.68%
2012	163	−1.52%
2017	180	+2.00%
2023	181	+0.09%
Source: INSEE

== See also ==
- Communes of the Gers department
