= Saint-Soulan =

- Commune
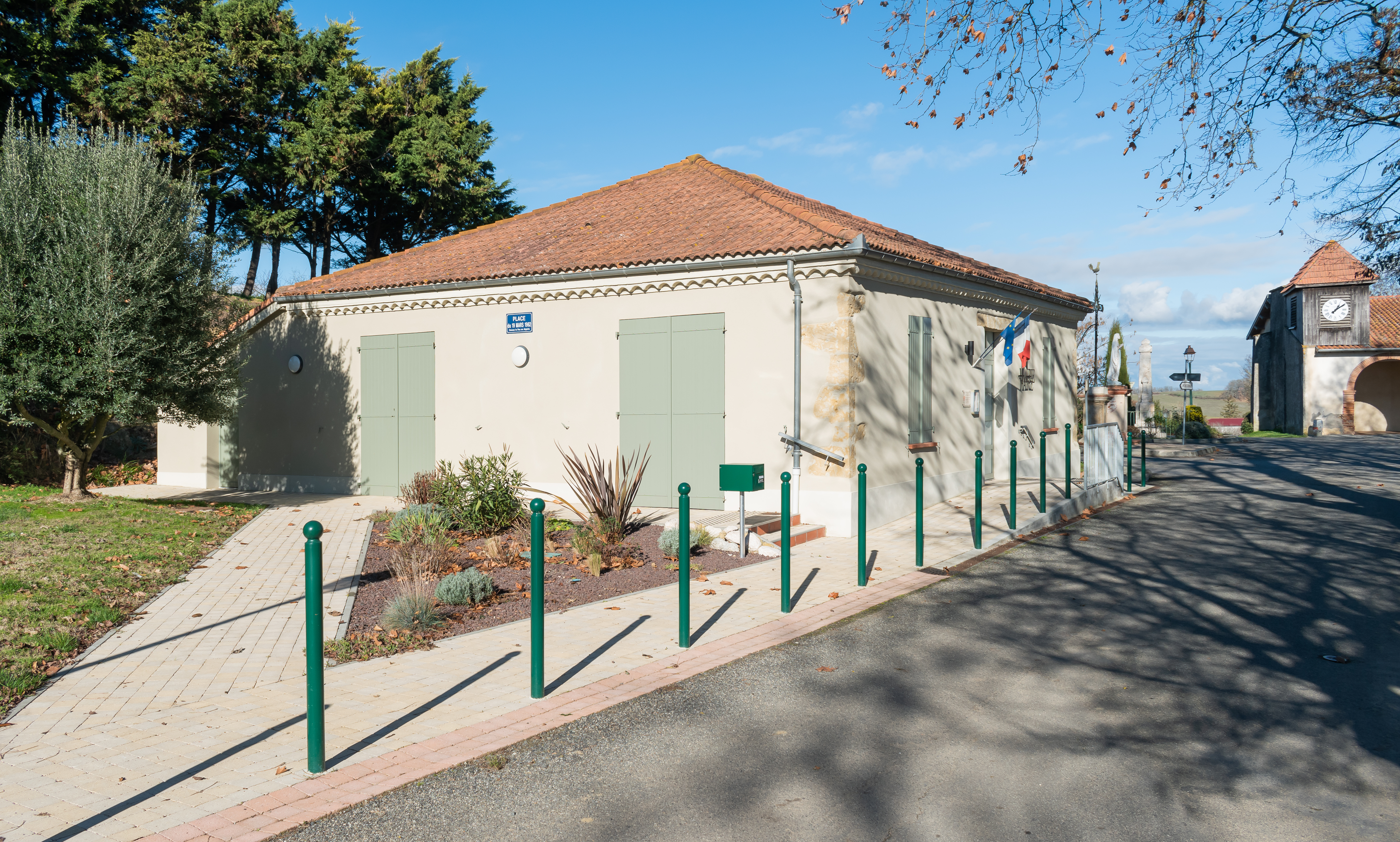
- Location of Saint-Soulan
- Location within France Location within Occitanie
- Coordinates: 43°30′33″N 0°51′31″E
- Country: France
- Region: Occitania
- Department: Gers
- Arrondissement: Auch
- Canton: Val de Save
- Intercommunality: Savès

Government
  - Mayor (2020–2026): Jacques Alfenore
- Area^{1}: 12.31 km^{2} (4.75 sq mi)
- Elevation: 285 m (935 ft)
- Highest elevation: 302 m (991 ft)
- Lowest elevation: 174 m (571 ft)
- Population (2023): 152
  - Density: 12.3/km^{2} (32.0/sq mi)
- Time zone: UTC+01:00 (CET)
  - Summer (DST): UTC+02:00 (CEST)
- INSEE/Postal code: 32407 /32220
- ^{1} French Land Register data, which excludes lakes, ponds, glaciers > 1 km^{2} (0.386 sq mi or 247 acres) and river estuaries.

Saint-Soulan (French pronunciation: [sɛ̃ sulɑ̃]; Gascon: Sent Solan) is a commune in the Gers department in southwestern France.

== Geography ==
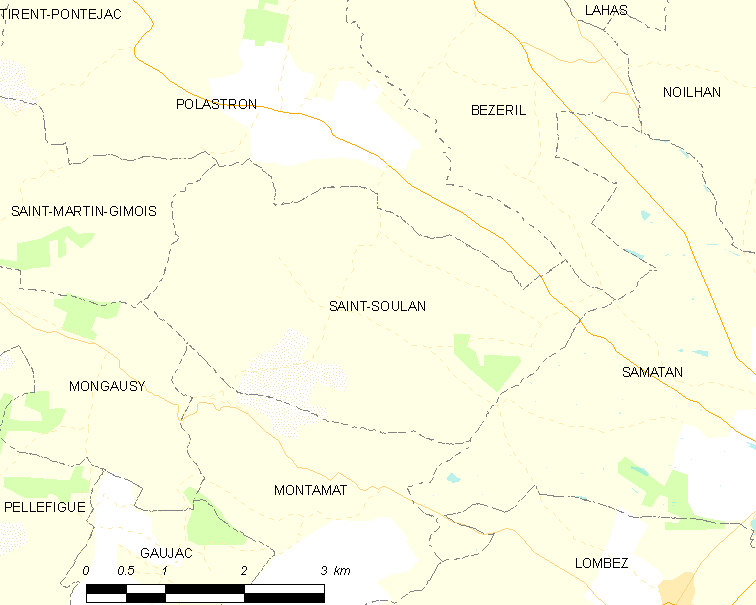
Saint-Soulan and its surrounding communes

== Population ==
Historical population
Year	Pop.	±% p.a.
1968	169	—
1975	141	−2.55%
1982	155	+1.36%
1990	145	−0.83%
1999	134	−0.87%
2007	143	+0.82%
2012	156	+1.76%
2017	160	+0.51%
2023	152	−0.85%
Source: INSEE

== See also ==
- Communes of the Gers department
