= Sauvimont =

- Commune
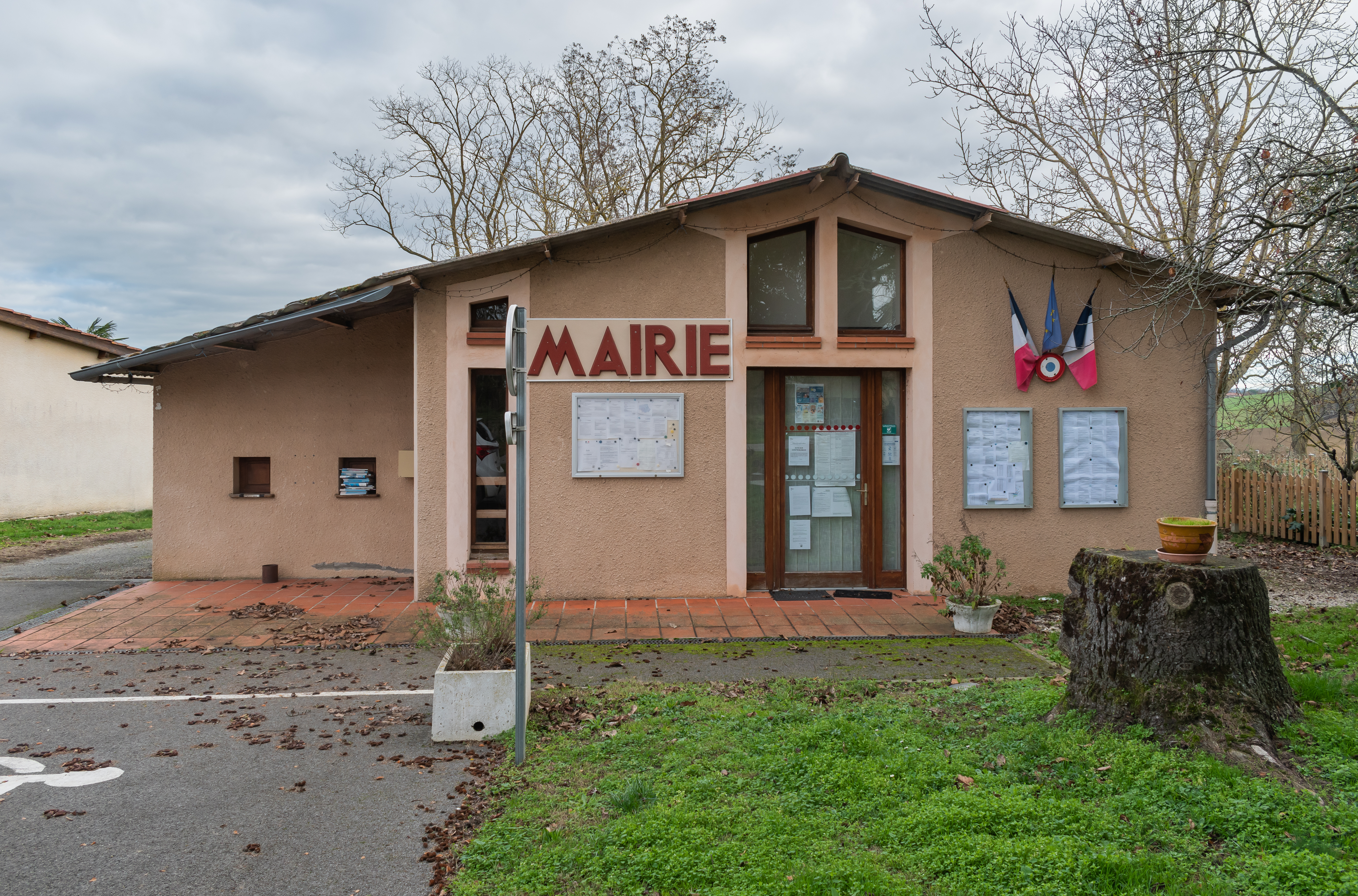
- Location of Sauvimont
- Location within France Location within Occitanie
- Coordinates: 43°26′59″N 0°58′09″E
- Country: France
- Region: Occitania
- Department: Gers
- Arrondissement: Auch
- Canton: Val de Save
- Intercommunality: Savès

Government
  - Mayor (2020–2026): Michel Lacroix
- Area^{1}: 3.44 km^{2} (1.33 sq mi)
- Elevation: 220 m (720 ft)
- Highest elevation: 271 m (889 ft)
- Lowest elevation: 170 m (560 ft)
- Population (2023): 65
  - Density: 19/km^{2} (49/sq mi)
- Time zone: UTC+01:00 (CET)
  - Summer (DST): UTC+02:00 (CEST)
- INSEE/Postal code: 32420 /32220
- ^{1} French Land Register data, which excludes lakes, ponds, glaciers > 1 km^{2} (0.386 sq mi or 247 acres) and river estuaries.

Sauvimont (French pronunciation: [sovimɔ̃]) is a commune in the Gers department in southwestern France.

== Geography ==
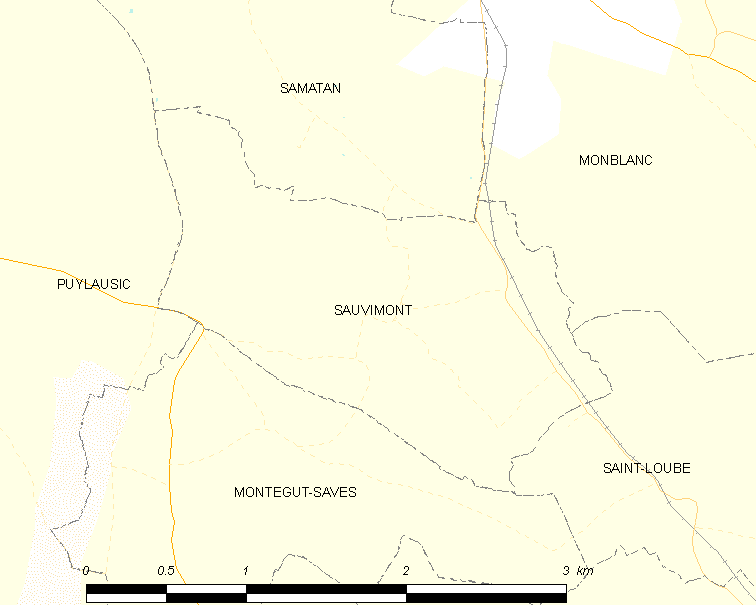
Sauvimont and its surrounding communes

== Population ==
Historical population
Year	Pop.	±% p.a.
1968	58	—
1975	49	−2.38%
1982	37	−3.93%
1990	42	+1.60%
1999	39	−0.82%
2007	67	+7.00%
2012	68	+0.30%
2017	66	−0.60%
2023	65	−0.25%
Source: INSEE

== See also ==
- Communes of the Gers department
- Savès
