= Mongausy =

- Commune
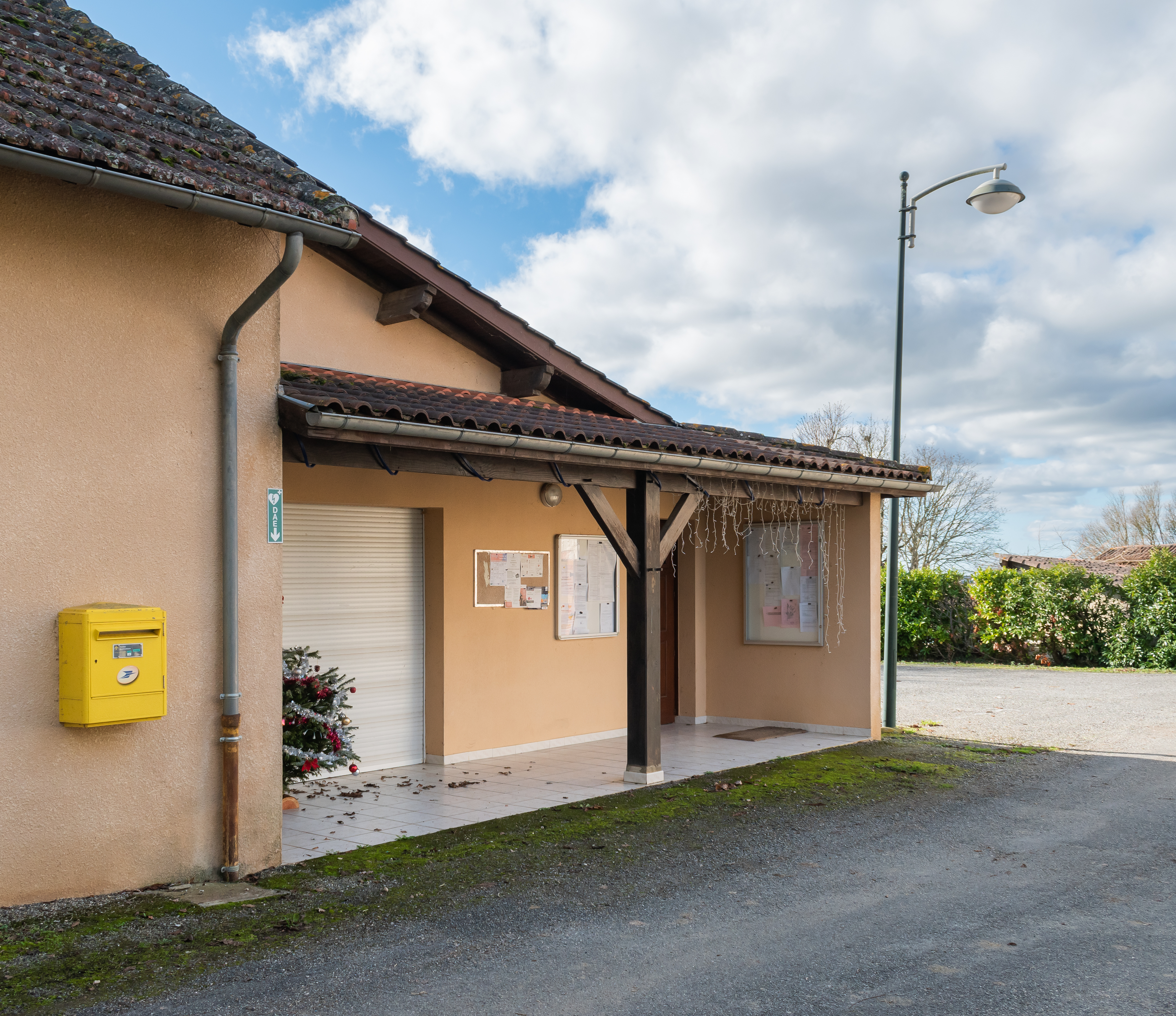

- Coat of arms
- Location of Mongausy
- Location within France Location within Occitanie
- Coordinates: 43°30′31″N 0°48′25″E
- Country: France
- Region: Occitania
- Department: Gers
- Arrondissement: Auch
- Canton: Val de Save

Government
  - Mayor (2021–2026): Michelle Idrac
- Area^{1}: 7.41 km^{2} (2.86 sq mi)
- Elevation: 297 m (974 ft)
- Highest elevation: 305 m (1,001 ft)
- Lowest elevation: 177 m (581 ft)
- Population (2023): 91
  - Density: 12/km^{2} (32/sq mi)
- Time zone: UTC+01:00 (CET)
  - Summer (DST): UTC+02:00 (CEST)
- INSEE/Postal code: 32270 /32220
- ^{1} French Land Register data, which excludes lakes, ponds, glaciers > 1 km^{2} (0.386 sq mi or 247 acres) and river estuaries.

Mongausy (French pronunciation: [mɔ̃ɡozi]; Gascon: Montgausin) is a commune in the Gers department in southwestern France.

== Geography ==
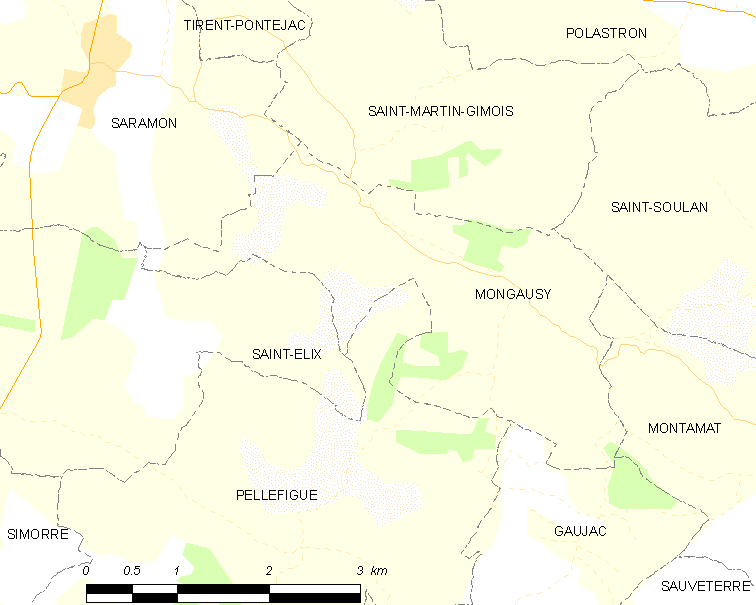
Mongausy and its surrounding communes

== Population ==
Historical population
Year	Pop.	±% p.a.
1968	83	—
1975	89	+1.00%
1982	77	−2.05%
1990	75	−0.33%
1999	64	−1.75%
2007	76	+2.17%
2012	75	−0.26%
2017	75	+0.00%
2023	91	+3.28%
Source: INSEE

== See also ==
- Communes of the Gers department
