= Noilhan =

- Commune
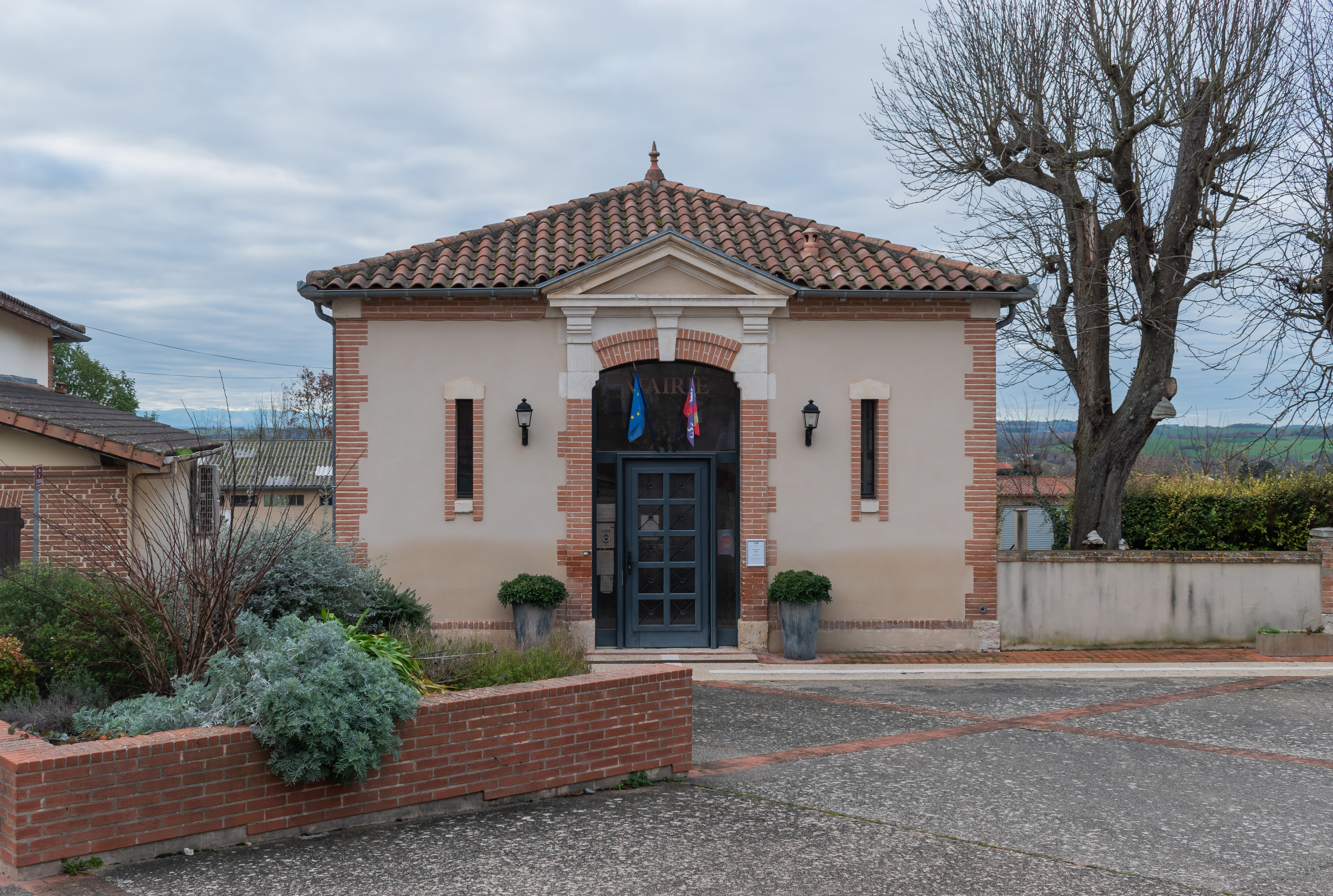
- Location of Noilhan
- Location within France Location within Occitanie
- Coordinates: 43°32′10″N 0°56′00″E
- Country: France
- Region: Occitania
- Department: Gers
- Arrondissement: Auch
- Canton: Val de Save
- Intercommunality: Savès

Government
  - Mayor (2020–2026): Thierry Bonnefoi
- Area^{1}: 18.03 km^{2} (6.96 sq mi)
- Elevation: 244 m (801 ft)
- Highest elevation: 256 m (840 ft)
- Lowest elevation: 155 m (509 ft)
- Population (2023): 388
  - Density: 21.5/km^{2} (55.7/sq mi)
- Time zone: UTC+01:00 (CET)
  - Summer (DST): UTC+02:00 (CEST)
- INSEE/Postal code: 32297 /32130
- ^{1} French Land Register data, which excludes lakes, ponds, glaciers > 1 km^{2} (0.386 sq mi or 247 acres) and river estuaries.

Noilhan (French pronunciation: [nwajɑ̃]; Occitan: Nolhan) is a commune in the Gers department in southwestern France.

== Geography ==
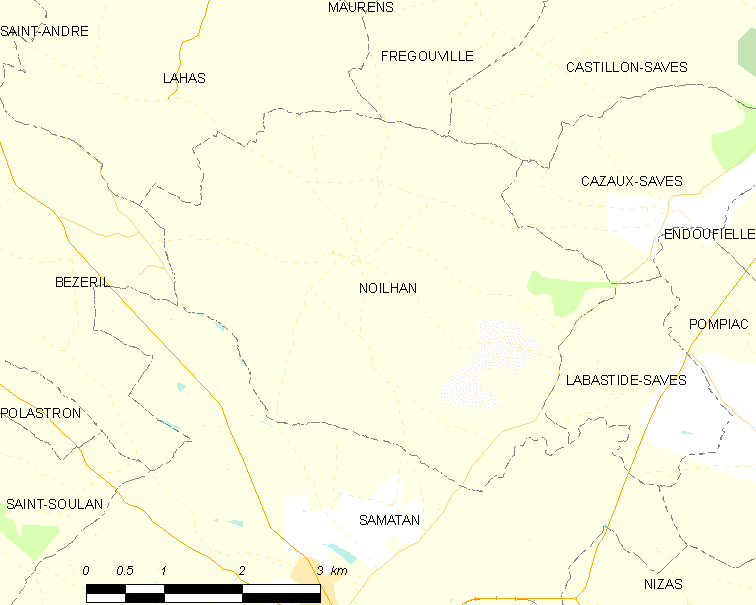
Noilhan and its surrounding communes

== Population ==
Historical population
Year	Pop.	±% p.a.
1968	304	—
1975	267	−1.84%
1982	326	+2.89%
1990	283	−1.75%
1999	247	−1.50%
2007	300	+2.46%
2012	349	+3.07%
2017	375	+1.45%
2023	388	+0.57%
Source: INSEE

== See also ==
- Communes of the Gers department
- Savès
