= Gaujac, Gers =

Gaujac
- Commune
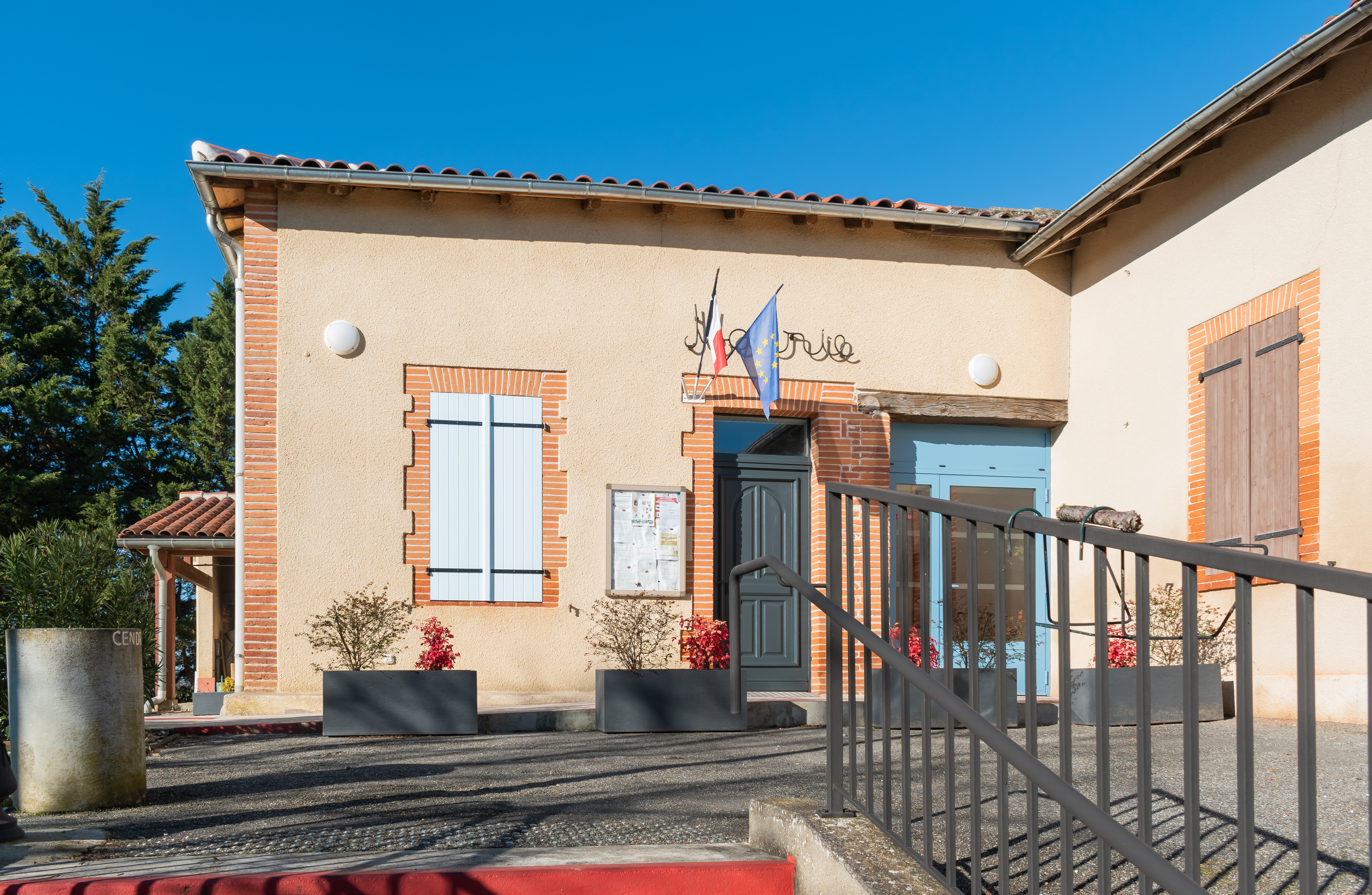
- Location of Gaujac
- Location within France Location within Occitanie
- Coordinates: 43°28′49″N 0°50′03″E
- Country: France
- Region: Occitania
- Department: Gers
- Arrondissement: Auch
- Canton: Val de Save

Government
  - Mayor (2020–2026): Michèle Danflous
- Area^{1}: 5.01 km^{2} (1.93 sq mi)
- Elevation: 303 m (994 ft)
- Highest elevation: 311 m (1,020 ft)
- Lowest elevation: 204 m (669 ft)
- Population (2023): 76
  - Density: 15/km^{2} (39/sq mi)
- Time zone: UTC+01:00 (CET)
  - Summer (DST): UTC+02:00 (CEST)
- INSEE/Postal code: 32140 /32220
- ^{1} French Land Register data, which excludes lakes, ponds, glaciers > 1 km^{2} (0.386 sq mi or 247 acres) and river estuaries.

Gaujac (French pronunciation: [ɡoʒak]) is a commune in the Gers department in southwestern France.

== Geography ==
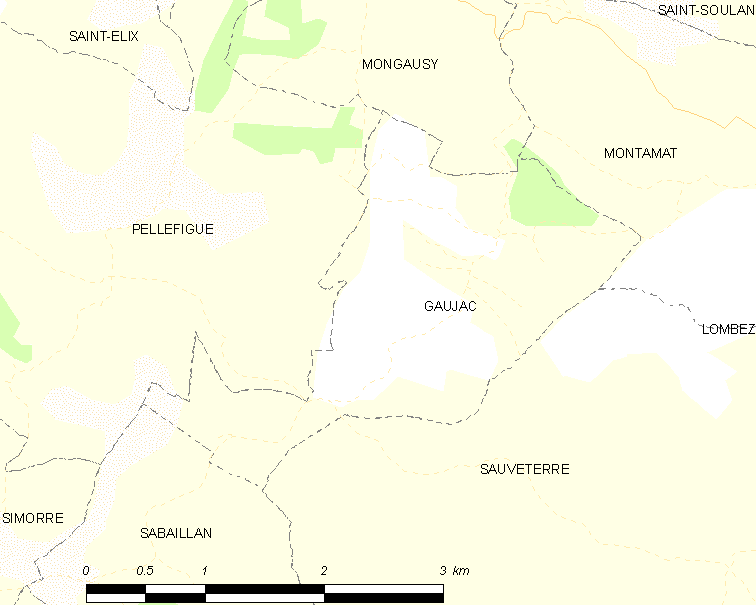
Gaujac and its surrounding communes

== Population ==
Historical population
Year	Pop.	±% p.a.
1968	72	—
1975	65	−1.45%
1982	65	+0.00%
1990	53	−2.52%
1999	37	−3.91%
2007	56	+5.32%
2012	61	+1.73%
2017	66	+1.59%
2023	76	+2.38%
Source: INSEE

== See also ==
- Communes of the Gers department
