= Lucien Polastron =

French writer and historian

Lucien X. Polastron (born 1944) is a French writer and historian, specializing in paper, books, writing, library history, and Chinese and Arab studies. He has written some 12 French-language books, some of which have been translated into other languages, including English. He lives and works in Paris. The 1992 destruction of the National Library in Sarajevo, the capital city and largest urban center of Bosnia and Herzegovina, was the catalyst for Polastron's research into the destruction of libraries.

== Books in English ==
- Books on Fire: The Destruction of Libraries throughout History, Rochester, Inner Traditions, 2007, ISBN 978-1-59477-167-5, ISBN 1-59477-167-7
- The Great Digitization and the Quest to Know Everything, Rochester, Inner Traditions, 2009, ISBN 978-1-59477-243-6

== Selected works ==
- Polastron, Lucien X.Le Papier: (2000) ans d'histoire et de savoir-faire, Imprimerie Nationale Editions (Paris, France), 1999.
- Polastron, Lucien X. Découverte de l'enluminure médiévale, Dessain & Tolra (Paris, France), 2003.
- Polastron, Lucien X. (2008) "Ce Que Construisent Les Ruines". In What Happened to the Ancient Library of Alexandria?, (Leiden, The Netherlands: Brill, 2008. doi:https://doi.org/10.1163/ej.9789004165458.i-259.36

== Awards ==
Société des Gens de Lettres Prize for Nonfiction/History, 2004, for Livres en feu: Histoire de la destruction sans fin des bibliothéques.
