= Polastron, Gers =

Polastron
- Commune
- Location of Polastron
- Location within France Location within Occitanie
- Coordinates: 43°31′56″N 0°50′44″E
- Country: France
- Region: Occitania
- Department: Gers
- Arrondissement: Auch
- Canton: Val de Save
- Intercommunality: Savès

Government
  - Mayor (2020–2026): Alain Laffiteau
- Area^{1}: 15.21 km^{2} (5.87 sq mi)
- Elevation: 192 m (630 ft)
- Highest elevation: 286 m (938 ft)
- Lowest elevation: 171 m (561 ft)
- Population (2023): 263
  - Density: 17.3/km^{2} (44.8/sq mi)
- Time zone: UTC+01:00 (CET)
  - Summer (DST): UTC+02:00 (CEST)
- INSEE/Postal code: 32321 /32130
- ^{1} French Land Register data, which excludes lakes, ponds, glaciers > 1 km^{2} (0.386 sq mi or 247 acres) and river estuaries.

Polastron (French pronunciation: [pɔlastʁɔ̃]) is a commune in the Gers department in southwestern France.

== Geography ==
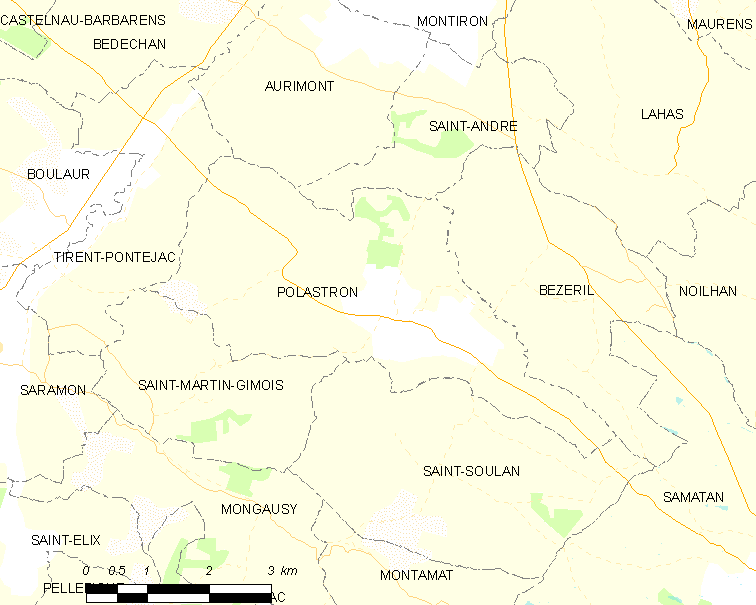
Polastron and its surrounding communes

== Population ==
Historical population
Year	Pop.	±% p.a.
1968	231	—
1975	198	−2.18%
1982	191	−0.51%
1990	191	+0.00%
1999	188	−0.18%
2007	236	+2.88%
2012	264	+2.27%
2017	272	+0.60%
2023	263	−0.56%
Source: INSEE

== See also ==
- Communes of the Gers department
