= Gaujan =

- Commune
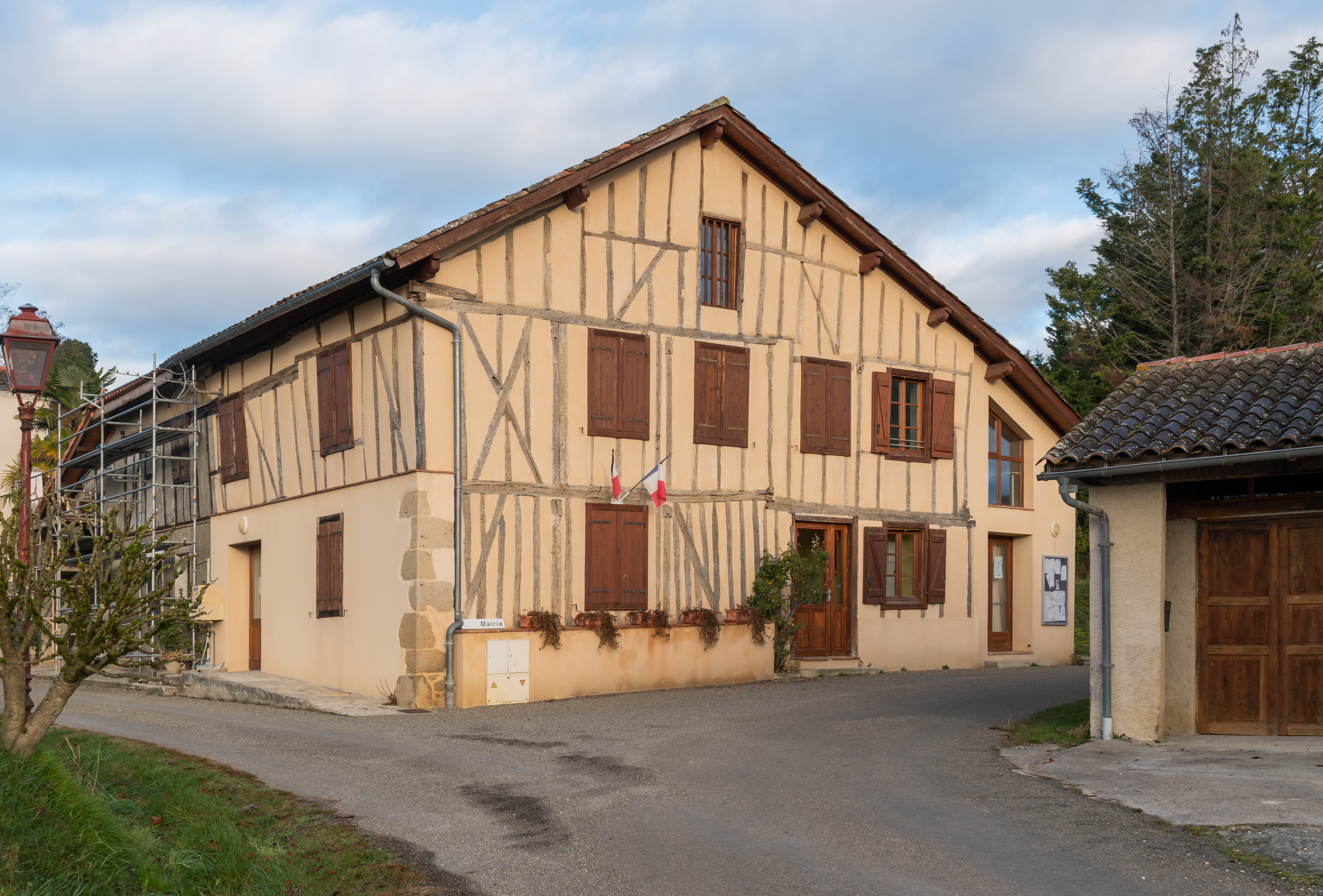
- Location of Gaujan
- Location within France Location within Occitanie
- Coordinates: 43°24′33″N 0°43′24″E
- Country: France
- Region: Occitania
- Department: Gers
- Arrondissement: Auch
- Canton: Val de Save

Government
  - Mayor (2023–2026): Gérard Roehrig
- Area^{1}: 10.82 km^{2} (4.18 sq mi)
- Elevation: 200 m (660 ft)
- Highest elevation: 329 m (1,079 ft)
- Lowest elevation: 208 m (682 ft)
- Population (2023): 122
  - Density: 11.3/km^{2} (29.2/sq mi)
- Time zone: UTC+01:00 (CET)
  - Summer (DST): UTC+02:00 (CEST)
- INSEE/Postal code: 32141 /32420
- ^{1} French Land Register data, which excludes lakes, ponds, glaciers > 1 km^{2} (0.386 sq mi or 247 acres) and river estuaries.

Gaujan (French pronunciation: [ɡoʒɑ̃]) is a commune in the Gers department in southwestern France.

== Geography ==
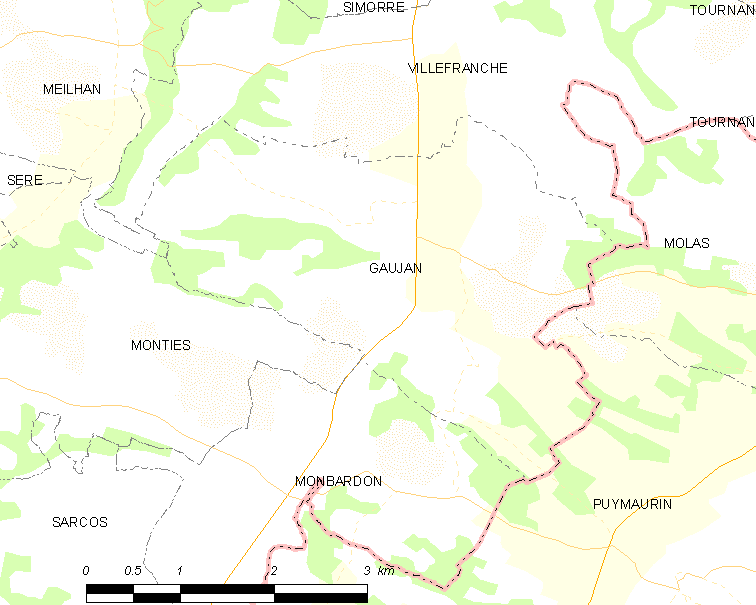
Gaujan and its surrounding communes

== Population ==
Historical population
Year	Pop.	±% p.a.
1968	178	—
1975	138	−3.57%
1982	124	−1.52%
1990	131	+0.69%
1999	107	−2.22%
2007	101	−0.72%
2012	103	+0.39%
2017	118	+2.76%
2023	122	+0.56%
Source: INSEE

== See also ==
- Communes of the Gers department
