= Nizas, Gers =

Nizas
- Commune
- Location of Nizas
- Location within France Location within Occitanie
- Coordinates: 43°29′56″N 1°00′00″E
- Country: France
- Region: Occitania
- Department: Gers
- Arrondissement: Auch
- Canton: Val de Save
- Intercommunality: Savès

Government
  - Mayor (2020–2026): Didier Larrieu
- Area^{1}: 4.16 km^{2} (1.61 sq mi)
- Elevation: 500 m (1,600 ft)
- Highest elevation: 266 m (873 ft)
- Lowest elevation: 158 m (518 ft)
- Population (2023): 141
  - Density: 33.9/km^{2} (87.8/sq mi)
- Time zone: UTC+01:00 (CET)
  - Summer (DST): UTC+02:00 (CEST)
- INSEE/Postal code: 32295 /32130
- ^{1} French Land Register data, which excludes lakes, ponds, glaciers > 1 km^{2} (0.386 sq mi or 247 acres) and river estuaries.

Nizas is a commune in the Gers department in southwestern France.

== Geography ==
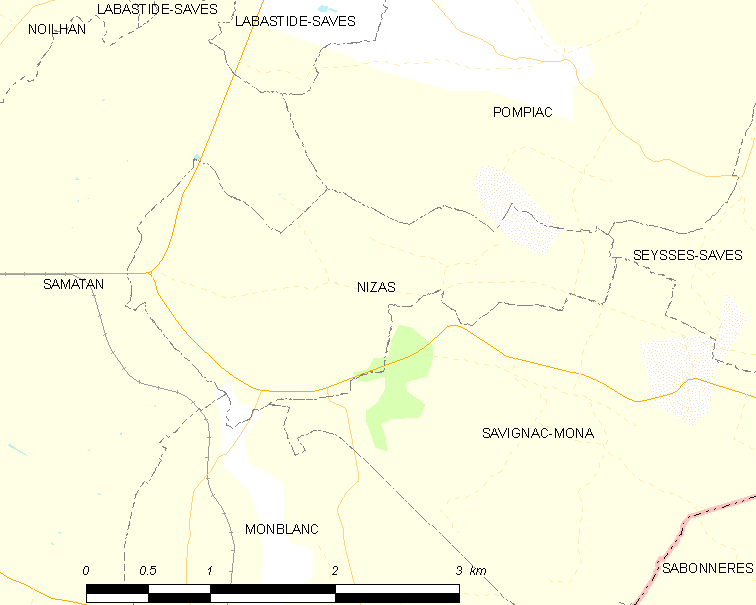
Nizas and its surrounding communes

== Population ==
Historical population
Year	Pop.	±% p.a.
1968	98	—
1975	91	−1.05%
1982	103	+1.79%
1990	98	−0.62%
1999	78	−2.50%
2007	167	+9.98%
2012	163	−0.48%
2017	149	−1.78%
2023	141	−0.92%
Source: INSEE

== See also ==
- Communes of the Gers department
- Savès
