= Gustave Lassalle-Bordes =

French painter

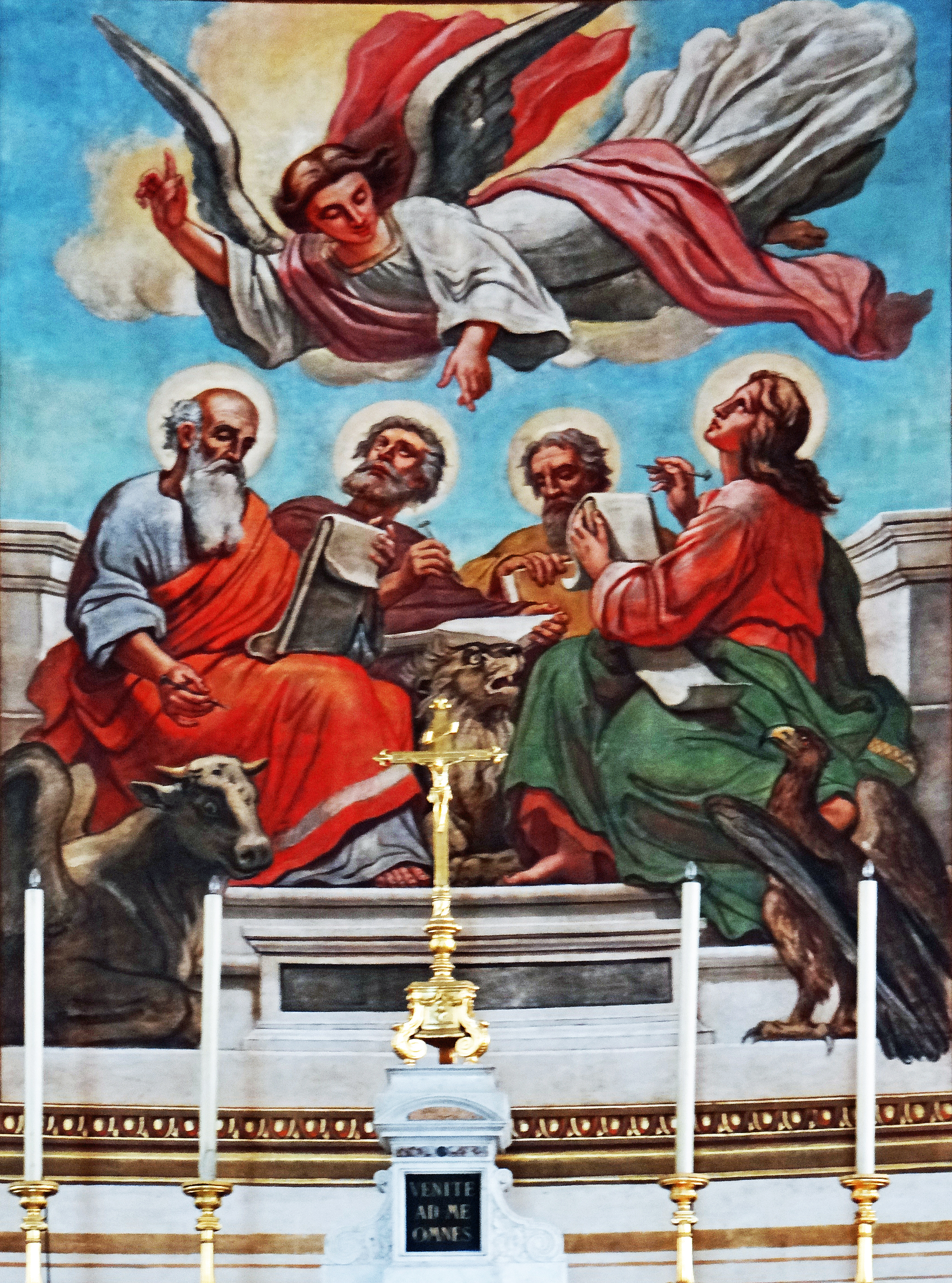
The Four Evangelists, at the Église Saint-Nicolas de Nérac (1854/55)

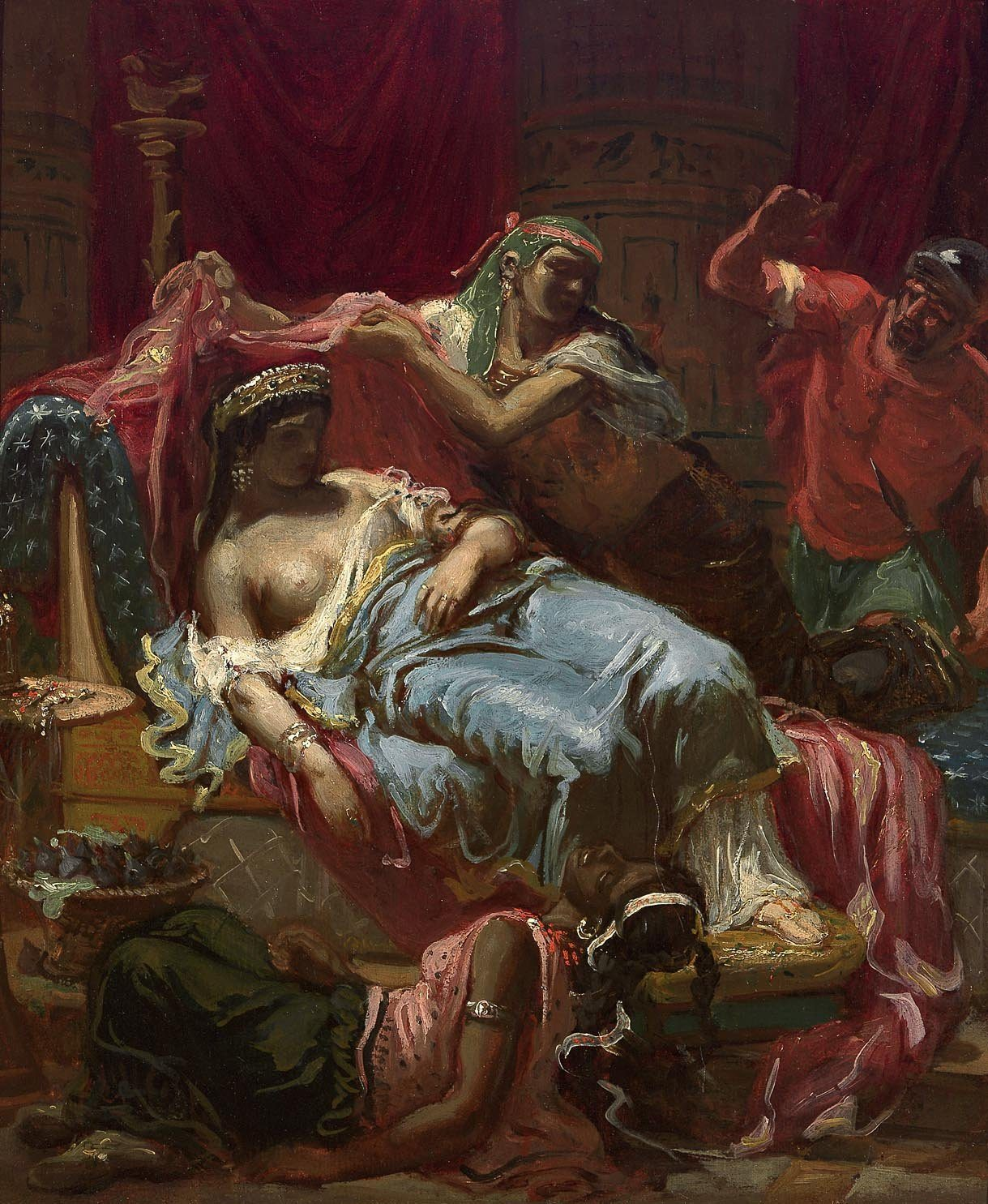
The Death of Cleopatra (1846)

Gustave Lassalle-Bordes (1814/1815, Bezolles or Auch - 17 November 1886, Auch) was a French painter in the Romantic style, known primarily for historical scenes.

== Biography ==
He was born to a family of the petty nobility in Gascony and sometimes styled himself de Lassalle-Bordes. At the age of seventeen, he went to Paris to study historical painting. He became a student of Paul Delaroche and collaborated with Charles-Philippe Larivière, a well known history painter. Then he assisted Jules-Claude Ziegler; helping him create paintings in the cupola of the Église de la Madeleine. His first exhibit at the Paris Salon came at the Salon of 1835. Two years later, his canvases caught the attention of Eugène Delacroix

The following year found him working in Delacroix's studio, where he became the principal assistant and, later, the manager. One of his major projects involved assisting with the murals at the Library of the National Assembly. By 1848, however, his relationship with Delacroix had soured and he is known to have complained to the art critic, Philippe Burty (who was editing Delacroix's letters) that he was tired of working in the shadows.

At the Salon of 1850, his work Le Martyre des sept frères Macchabées, or La Mort des Macchabées, was purchased by the French government, further stoking his desire for independence. That same year, Delacroix was commissioned to paint murals at the Église Saint-Sulpice and chose Pierre Andrieu, another of his employees, as his chief assistant; citing an "indisposition" by Lassalle-Bordes.

The final break came in 1851, when he accused Delacroix of having prevented him from receiving commissions from the Prefect, Georges-Eugène Haussmann, to decorate the sanctuary at the Église Saint-Jean-Baptiste de Belleville and other important projects at the Conseil d’État.

Embittered, he returned to his native province and settled permanently in Auch in 1853. There, he capitalized on his relationship with Delacroix and the rave reviews he had received from Charles Baudelaire at the 1846 Salon for his Death of Cleopatra. He served as a drawing teacher in the local schools for the rest of his life, although he received numerous commissions for work at churches and chateaux in the region. In 1854, he was hired to paint murals at the Église Saint-Nicolas de Nérac. The curé, Joseph-Emmanuel de Vivie, is on record as having complained about how difficult it was to work with him.

He participated in many regional exhibitions and, in 1865, he was awarded a commission to decorate the Château de Montbrun, in Cologne (which was being restored), with a series of mythological figures. This was followed by a series of portraits; of illustrious local citizens, to decorate the town halls in Auch, Lectoure and Condom. Eight of those portraits received an official inauguration ceremony in Auch in 1868. In 1872, he was named a Professor at the Auch lycée.
