= Callian =

Callian may refer to:

France

- Callian, Gers
- Callian, Var

India

- Kalyan, Maharashtra, formerly Callian
