= Caillavet =

Caillavet may refer to:

- Caillavet, Gers, a French commune

== People with the surname ==
- Henri Caillavet, French politician of the Fourth Republic
- Gaston Arman de Caillavet, French playwright
