= Peyrusse-Vieille =

- Commune
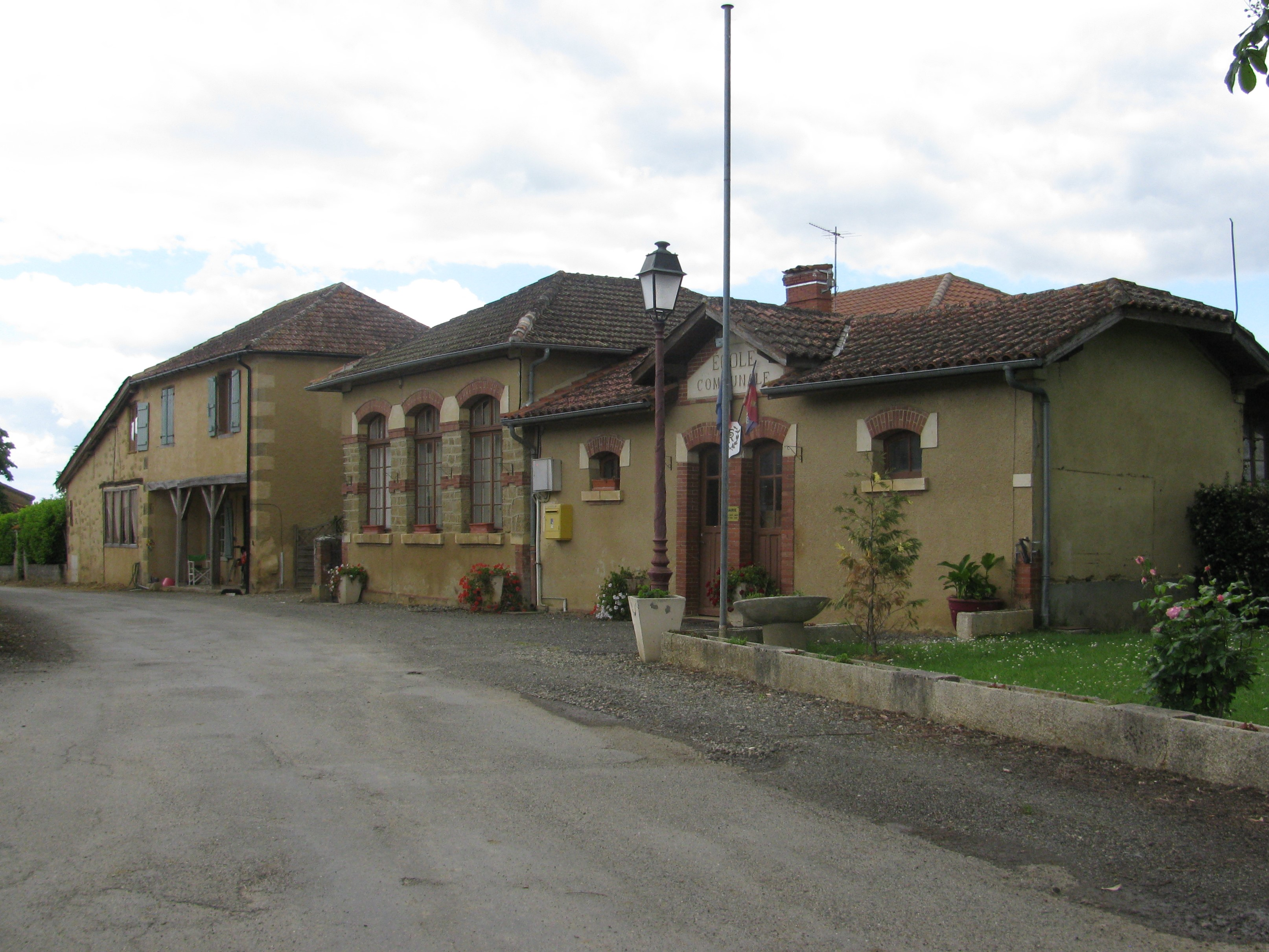
- The town hall
- Location of Peyrusse-Vieille
- Location within France Location within Occitanie
- Coordinates: 43°37′50″N 0°10′54″E
- Country: France
- Region: Occitania
- Department: Gers
- Arrondissement: Auch
- Canton: Fezensac
- Intercommunality: Artagnan en Fézensac

Government
  - Mayor (2020–2026): Brigitte Serralta
- Area^{1}: 11.05 km^{2} (4.27 sq mi)
- Elevation: 250 m (820 ft)
- Highest elevation: 255 m (837 ft)
- Lowest elevation: 141 m (463 ft)
- Population (2023): 63
  - Density: 5.7/km^{2} (15/sq mi)
- Time zone: UTC+01:00 (CET)
  - Summer (DST): UTC+02:00 (CEST)
- INSEE/Postal code: 32317 /32230
- ^{1} French Land Register data, which excludes lakes, ponds, glaciers > 1 km^{2} (0.386 sq mi or 247 acres) and river estuaries.

Peyrusse-Vieille (French pronunciation: [peʁys vjɛj]; Occitan: Peirussa Vielha) is a commune in the Gers department in southwestern France.

== Geography ==
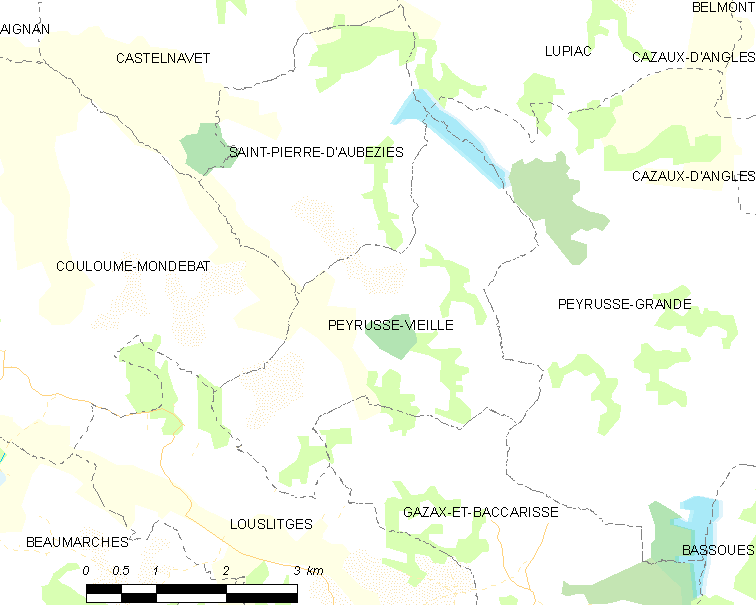
Peyrusse-Vieille and its surrounding communes

== Population ==
Historical population
Year	Pop.	±% p.a.
1968	143	—
1975	113	−3.31%
1982	111	−0.25%
1990	99	−1.42%
1999	78	−2.61%
2007	71	−1.17%
2012	74	+0.83%
2017	70	−1.11%
2023	63	−1.74%
Source: INSEE

== See also ==
- Communes of the Gers department
