= Mirannes =

- Commune
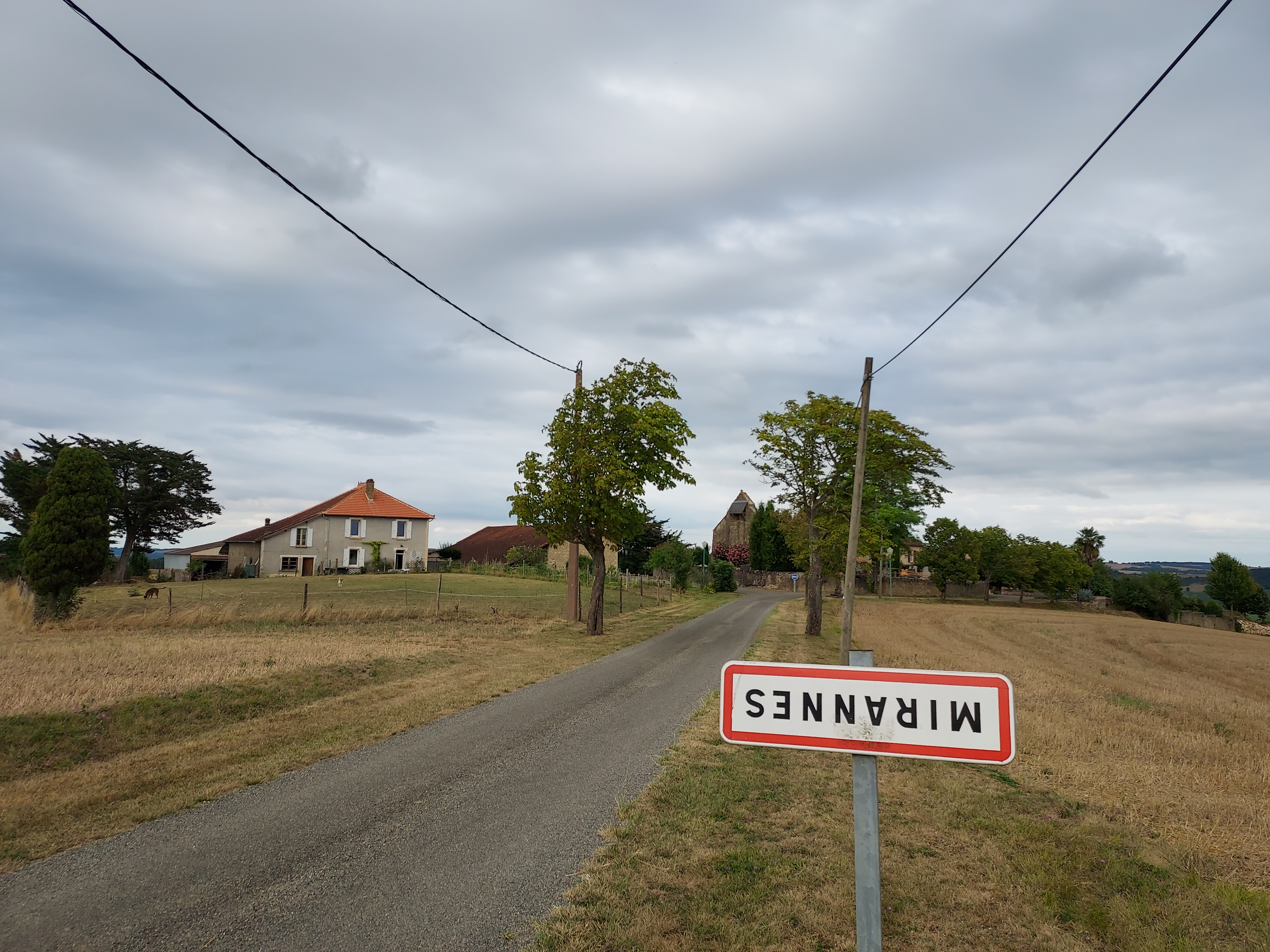
- General view of Mirannes.
- Location of Mirannes
- Location within France Location within Occitanie
- Coordinates: 43°37′12″N 0°22′59″E
- Country: France
- Region: Occitania
- Department: Gers
- Arrondissement: Auch
- Canton: Fezensac

Government
  - Mayor (2020–2026): Pierre Labriffe
- Area^{1}: 7.89 km^{2} (3.05 sq mi)
- Elevation: 200 m (660 ft)
- Highest elevation: 233 m (764 ft)
- Lowest elevation: 123 m (404 ft)
- Population (2023): 67
  - Density: 8.5/km^{2} (22/sq mi)
- Time zone: UTC+01:00 (CET)
  - Summer (DST): UTC+02:00 (CEST)
- INSEE/Postal code: 32257 /32350
- ^{1} French Land Register data, which excludes lakes, ponds, glaciers > 1 km^{2} (0.386 sq mi or 247 acres) and river estuaries.

Mirannes (French pronunciation: [miʁan]; Occitan: Miranas) is a commune in the Gers department in southwestern France.

== Geography ==
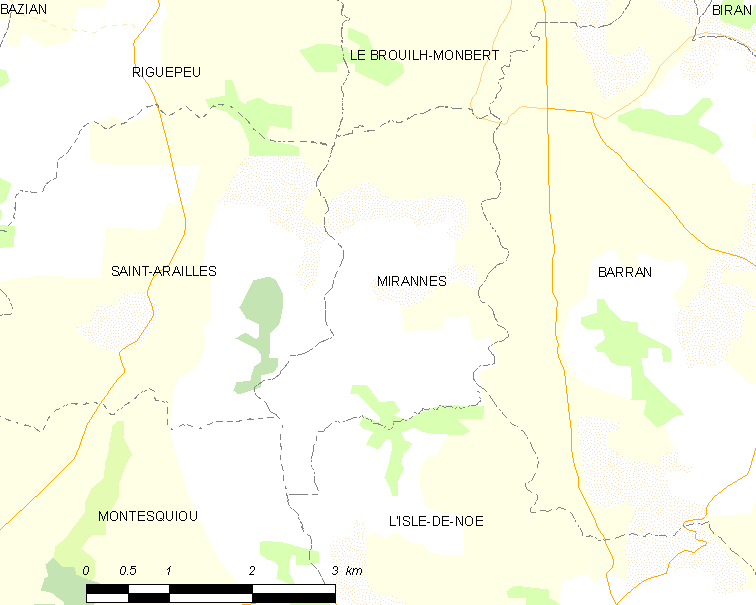
Mirannes and its surrounding communes

== Population ==
Historical population
Year	Pop.	±% p.a.
1968	102	—
1975	87	−2.25%
1982	72	−2.67%
1990	70	−0.35%
1999	75	+0.77%
2007	68	−1.22%
2012	72	+1.15%
2017	66	−1.73%
2023	67	+0.25%
Source: INSEE

== See also ==
- Communes of the Gers department
