= Justian =

- Commune
- Location of Justian
- Location within France Location within Occitanie
- Coordinates: 43°49′01″N 0°18′02″E
- Country: France
- Region: Occitania
- Department: Gers
- Arrondissement: Auch
- Canton: Fezensac
- Intercommunality: Artagnan en Fézensac

Government
  - Mayor (2020–2026): Philippe Cahuzac
- Area^{1}: 6.3 km^{2} (2.4 sq mi)
- Elevation: 103 m (338 ft)
- Highest elevation: 221 m (725 ft)
- Lowest elevation: 95 m (312 ft)
- Population (2023): 108
  - Density: 17/km^{2} (44/sq mi)
- Time zone: UTC+01:00 (CET)
  - Summer (DST): UTC+02:00 (CEST)
- INSEE/Postal code: 32166 /32190
- ^{1} French Land Register data, which excludes lakes, ponds, glaciers > 1 km^{2} (0.386 sq mi or 247 acres) and river estuaries.

Justian (French pronunciation: [ʒystjɑ̃]) is a commune in the Gers department in southwestern France.

== Geography ==
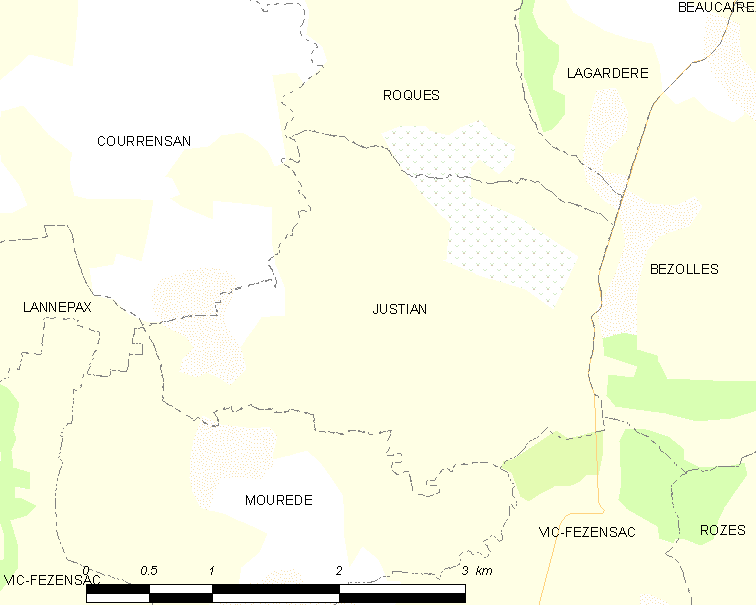
Justian and its surrounding communes

== Population ==
Historical population
Year	Pop.	±% p.a.
1968	92	—
1975	78	−2.33%
1982	100	+3.61%
1990	100	+0.00%
1999	93	−0.80%
2007	94	+0.13%
2012	108	+2.82%
2017	118	+1.79%
2023	108	−1.47%
Source: INSEE

== See also ==
- Communes of the Gers department
