= Saint-Arailles =

- Commune
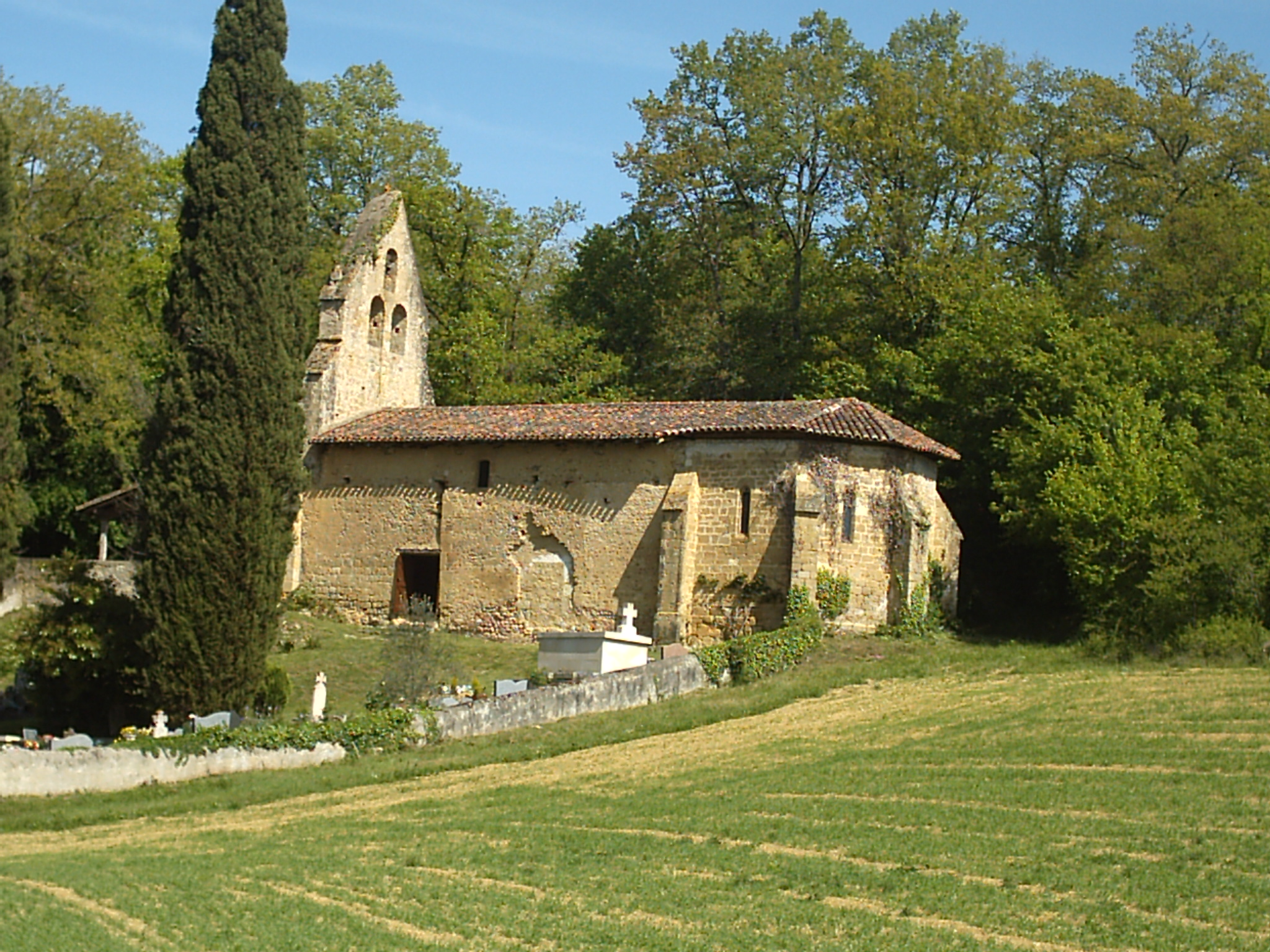
- The Bretous chapel in Saint-Arailles
- Location of Saint-Arailles
- Location within France Location within Occitanie
- Coordinates: 43°37′38″N 0°21′30″E
- Country: France
- Region: Occitania
- Department: Gers
- Arrondissement: Auch
- Canton: Fezensac
- Intercommunality: Artagnan en Fézensac

Government
  - Mayor (2020–2026): Bernard Lasportes
- Area^{1}: 13.2 km^{2} (5.1 sq mi)
- Elevation: 140 m (460 ft)
- Highest elevation: 236 m (774 ft)
- Lowest elevation: 136 m (446 ft)
- Population (2023): 134
  - Density: 10.2/km^{2} (26.3/sq mi)
- Time zone: UTC+01:00 (CET)
  - Summer (DST): UTC+02:00 (CEST)
- INSEE/Postal code: 32360 /32350
- ^{1} French Land Register data, which excludes lakes, ponds, glaciers > 1 km^{2} (0.386 sq mi or 247 acres) and river estuaries.

Saint-Arailles (French pronunciation: [sɛ̃.t‿aʁaj]; Occitan: Senta Aralha) is a commune in the Gers department in southwestern France.

== Geography ==
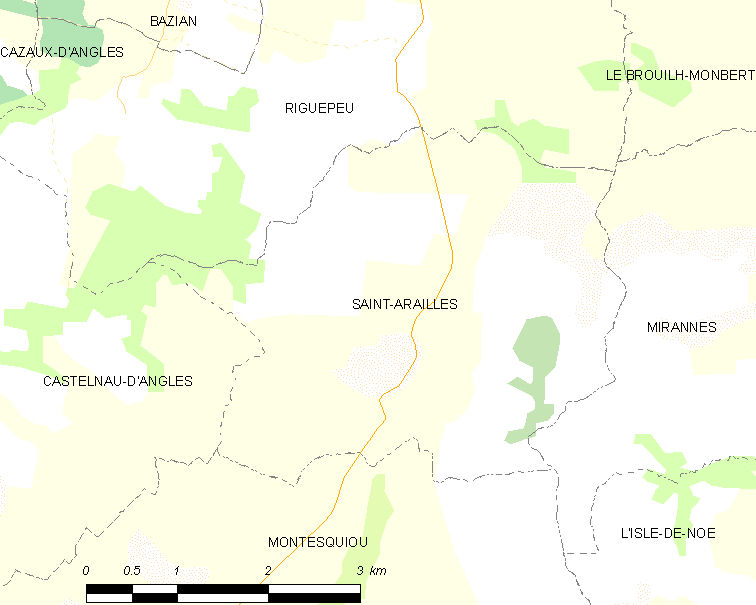
Saint-Arailles and its surrounding communes

== Population ==
Historical population
Year	Pop.	±% p.a.
1968	154	—
1975	139	−1.45%
1982	136	−0.31%
1990	133	−0.28%
1999	116	−1.51%
2007	128	+1.24%
2012	149	+3.08%
2017	135	−1.95%
2023	134	−0.12%
Source: INSEE

== See also ==
- Communes of the Gers department
