= Saint-Paul-de-Baïse =

- Commune
- Location of Saint-Paul-de-Baïse
- Location within France Location within Occitanie
- Coordinates: 43°46′34″N 0°22′27″E
- Country: France
- Region: Occitania
- Department: Gers
- Arrondissement: Auch
- Canton: Fezensac
- Intercommunality: Artagnan en Fézensac

Government
  - Mayor (2020–2026): Philippe Andrieu
- Area^{1}: 10.1 km^{2} (3.9 sq mi)
- Elevation: 180 m (590 ft)
- Highest elevation: 208 m (682 ft)
- Lowest elevation: 96 m (315 ft)
- Population (2023): 108
  - Density: 10.7/km^{2} (27.7/sq mi)
- Time zone: UTC+01:00 (CET)
  - Summer (DST): UTC+02:00 (CEST)
- INSEE/Postal code: 32402 /32190
- ^{1} French Land Register data, which excludes lakes, ponds, glaciers > 1 km^{2} (0.386 sq mi or 247 acres) and river estuaries.

Saint-Paul-de-Baïse (French pronunciation: [sɛ̃ pɔl də ba.iz], literally Saint-Paul of Baïse; Gascon: Sent Pau de Baïsa) is a commune in the Gers department in southwestern France.

== Geography ==
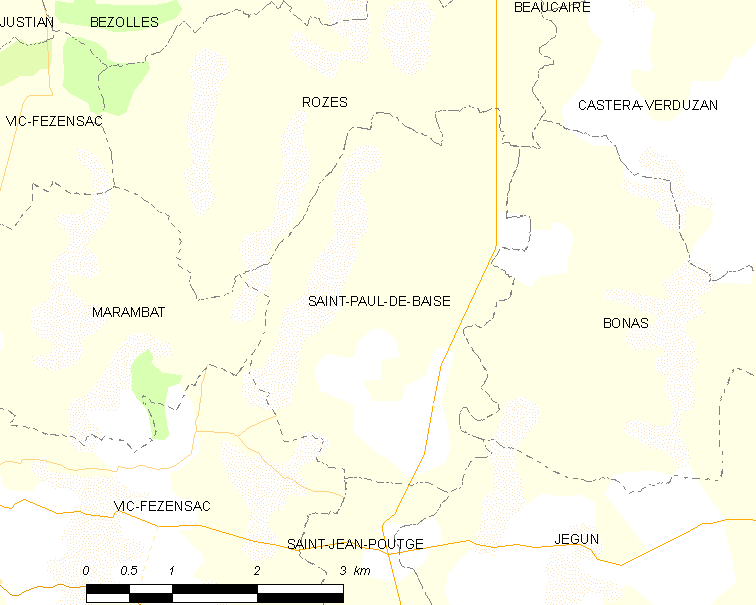
Saint-Paul-de-Baïse and its surrounding communes

== Population ==
Historical population
Year	Pop.	±% p.a.
1968	162	—
1975	136	−2.47%
1982	123	−1.43%
1990	107	−1.73%
1999	100	−0.75%
2007	112	+1.43%
2012	101	−2.05%
2017	102	+0.20%
2023	108	+0.96%
Source: INSEE

== See also ==
- Communes of the Gers department
