= Arrondissement of Auch =

Coordinates: 43.65°N 0.58°E

Auch
- Arrondissement
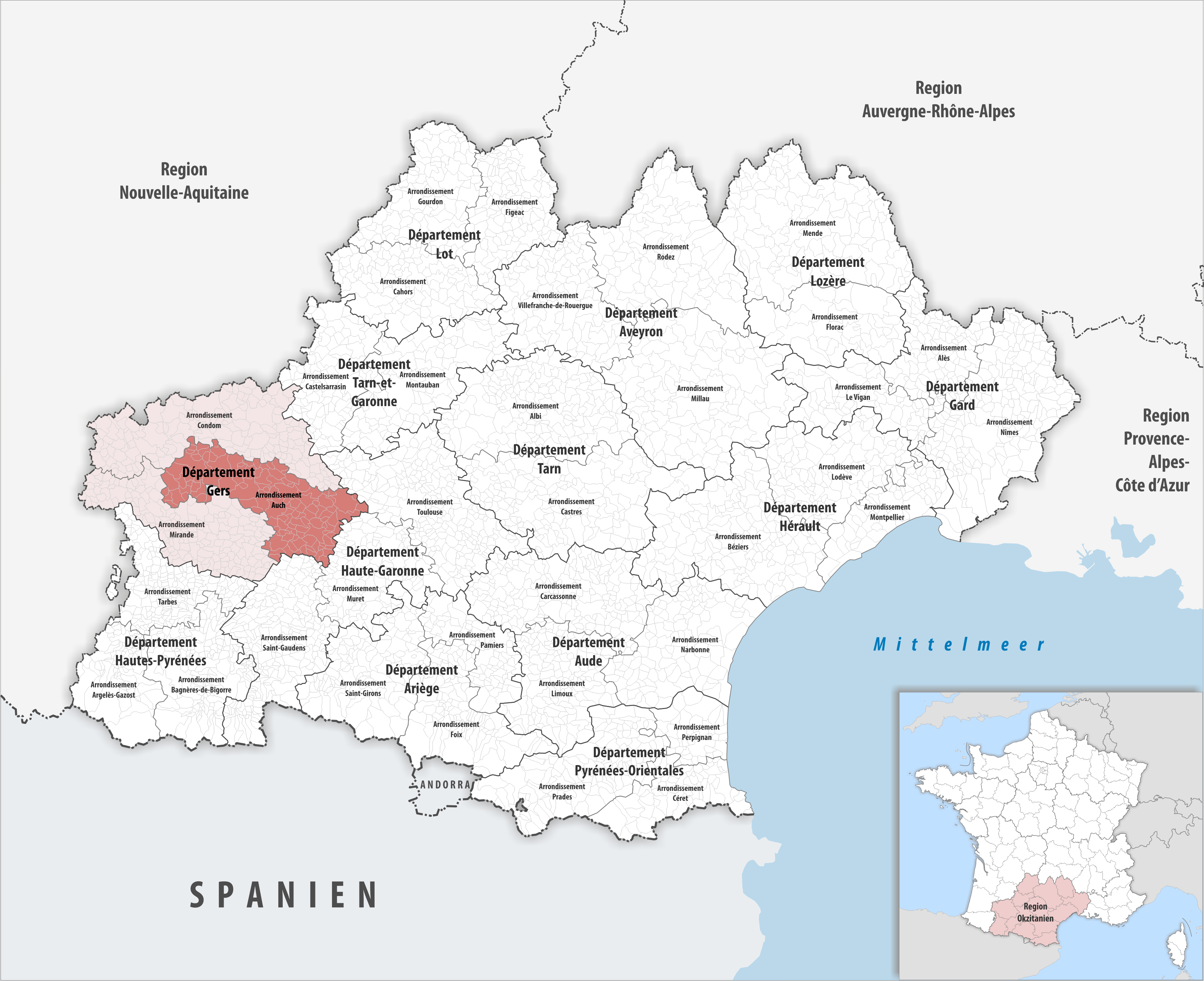
- Location within the region Occitanie
- Country: France
- Region: Occitania
- Department: Gers
- No. of communes: {{{nbcomm}}}
- Area: 1,923.5 km^{2} (742.7 sq mi)
- Population (2023): 84,005
  - Density: 43.673/km^{2} (113.11/sq mi)
- INSEE code: 321

The arrondissement of Auch is an arrondissement of France in the Gers department in the Occitanie region. It has 134 communes. Its population is 84,027 (2021), and its area is 1,923.5 km^{2} (742.7 sq mi).

== Composition ==
The communes of the arrondissement of Auch, and their INSEE codes, are:

1. Ansan (32002)
2. Antras (32003)
3. Aubiet (32012)
4. Auch (32013)
5. Augnax (32014)
6. Auradé (32016)
7. Aurimont (32018)
8. Auterive (32019)
9. Ayguetinte (32024)
10. Bazian (32033)
11. Beaupuy (32038)
12. Bédéchan (32040)
13. Belmont (32043)
14. Betcave-Aguin (32048)
15. Bézéril (32051)
16. Bezolles (32052)
17. Biran (32054)
18. Blanquefort (32056)
19. Bonas (32059)
20. Boulaur (32061)
21. Cadeillan (32069)
22. Caillavet (32071)
23. Callian (32072)
24. Castelnau-Barbarens (32076)
25. Castéra-Verduzan (32083)
26. Castillon-Debats (32088)
27. Castillon-Massas (32089)
28. Castillon-Savès (32090)
29. Castin (32091)
30. Cazaux-d'Anglès (32097)
31. Cazaux-Savès (32098)
32. Clermont-Savès (32105)
33. Crastes (32112)
34. Duran (32117)
35. Endoufielle (32121)
36. Escornebœuf (32123)
37. Espaon (32124)
38. Frégouville (32134)
39. Garravet (32138)
40. Gaujac (32140)
41. Gaujan (32141)
42. Gazax-et-Baccarisse (32144)
43. Gimont (32147)
44. Giscaro (32148)
45. L'Isle-Arné (32157)
46. L'Isle-Jourdain (32160)
47. Jegun (32162)
48. Juilles (32165)
49. Justian (32166)
50. Labastide-Savès (32171)
51. Lahas (32182)
52. Lahitte (32183)
53. Lartigue (32198)
54. Lavardens (32204)
55. Laymont (32206)
56. Leboulin (32207)
57. Lias (32210)
58. Lombez (32213)
59. Lupiac (32219)
60. Lussan (32221)
61. Marambat (32231)
62. Marestaing (32234)
63. Marsan (32237)
64. Maurens (32247)
65. Mérens (32251)
66. Mirannes (32257)
67. Mirepoix (32258)
68. Monblanc (32261)
69. Monferran-Savès (32268)
70. Mongausy (32270)
71. Montadet (32276)
72. Montamat (32277)
73. Montaut-les-Créneaux (32279)
74. Montégut (32282)
75. Montégut-Savès (32284)
76. Montiron (32288)
77. Montpézat (32289)
78. Mourède (32294)
79. Nizas (32295)
80. Noilhan (32297)
81. Nougaroulet (32298)
82. Ordan-Larroque (32301)
83. Pavie (32307)
84. Pébées (32308)
85. Pellefigue (32309)
86. Pessan (32312)
87. Peyrusse-Grande (32315)
88. Peyrusse-Massas (32316)
89. Peyrusse-Vieille (32317)
90. Polastron (32321)
91. Pompiac (32322)
92. Preignan (32331)
93. Préneron (32332)
94. Pujaudran (32334)
95. Puycasquier (32335)
96. Puylausic (32336)
97. Razengues (32339)
98. Riguepeu (32343)
99. Roquebrune (32346)
100. Roquefort (32347)
101. Roquelaure (32348)
102. Roques (32351)
103. Rozès (32352)
104. Sabaillan (32353)
105. Saint-André (32356)
106. Saint-Arailles (32360)
107. Saint-Caprais (32467)
108. Sainte-Christie (32368)
109. Saint-Élix-d'Astarac (32374)
110. Sainte-Marie (32388)
111. Saint-Jean-Poutge (32382)
112. Saint-Lary (32384)
113. Saint-Lizier-du-Planté (32386)
114. Saint-Loube (32387)
115. Saint-Martin-Gimois (32392)
116. Saint-Paul-de-Baïse (32402)
117. Saint-Pierre-d'Aubézies (32403)
118. Saint-Sauvy (32406)
119. Saint-Soulan (32407)
120. Samatan (32410)
121. Saramon (32412)
122. Sauveterre (32418)
123. Sauvimont (32420)
124. Savignac-Mona (32421)
125. Ségoufielle (32425)
126. Sémézies-Cachan (32428)
127. Seysses-Savès (32432)
128. Simorre (32433)
129. Tirent-Pontéjac (32447)
130. Tournan (32451)
131. Tourrenquets (32453)
132. Tudelle (32456)
133. Vic-Fezensac (32462)
134. Villefranche (32465)

== History ==
The arrondissement of Auch was created in 1800. At the January 2017 reorganisation of the arrondissements of Gers, it gained nine communes from the arrondissement of Condom and five communes from the arrondissement of Mirande, and it lost 13 communes to the arrondissement of Condom and 21 communes to the arrondissement of Mirande.

As a result of the reorganisation of the cantons of France which came into effect in 2015, the borders of the cantons are no longer related to the borders of the arrondissements. The cantons of the arrondissement of Auch were, as of January 2015:

1. Auch-Nord-Est
2. Auch-Nord-Ouest
3. Auch-Sud-Est-Seissan
4. Auch-Sud-Ouest
5. Cologne
6. Gimont
7. L'Isle-Jourdain
8. Jegun
9. Lombez
10. Samatan
11. Saramon
12. Vic-Fezensac
