= Bascous =

- Commune
- Location of Bascous
- Location within France Location within Occitanie
- Coordinates: 43°47′51″N 0°08′47″E
- Country: France
- Region: Occitania
- Department: Gers
- Arrondissement: Condom
- Canton: Fezensac

Government
  - Mayor (2020–2026): Nicolas Galisson
- Area^{1}: 10.22 km^{2} (3.95 sq mi)
- Elevation: 158 m (518 ft)
- Highest elevation: 212 m (696 ft)
- Lowest elevation: 138 m (453 ft)
- Population (2023): 170
  - Density: 17/km^{2} (43/sq mi)
- Time zone: UTC+01:00 (CET)
  - Summer (DST): UTC+02:00 (CEST)
- INSEE/Postal code: 32031 /32190
- ^{1} French Land Register data, which excludes lakes, ponds, glaciers > 1 km^{2} (0.386 sq mi or 247 acres) and river estuaries.

Bascous is a commune in the Gers department in southwestern France.

== Geography ==
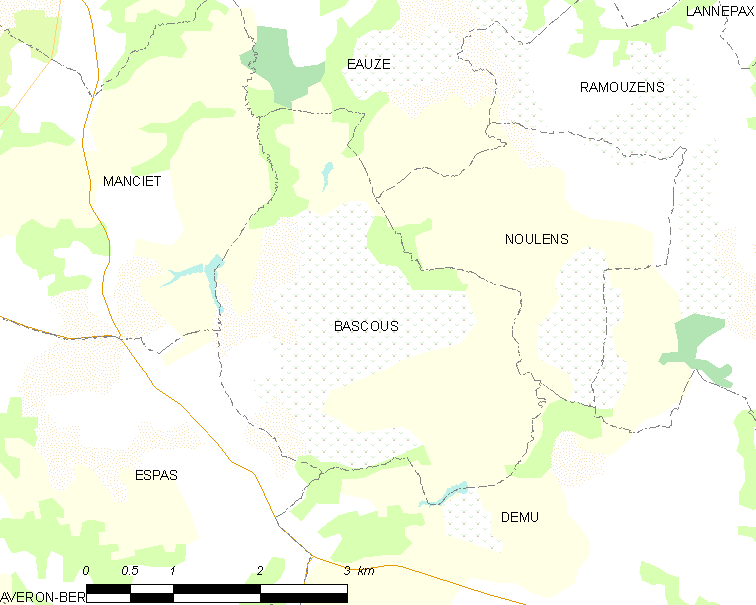
Bascous and its surrounding communes

== Population ==
Historical population
Year	Pop.	±% p.a.
1968	159	—
1975	139	−1.90%
1982	148	+0.90%
1990	144	−0.34%
1999	153	+0.68%
2007	133	−1.74%
2012	172	+5.28%
2017	170	−0.23%
2023	170	+0.00%
Source: INSEE

== See also ==
- Communes of the Gers department
