= Noulens =

- Commune
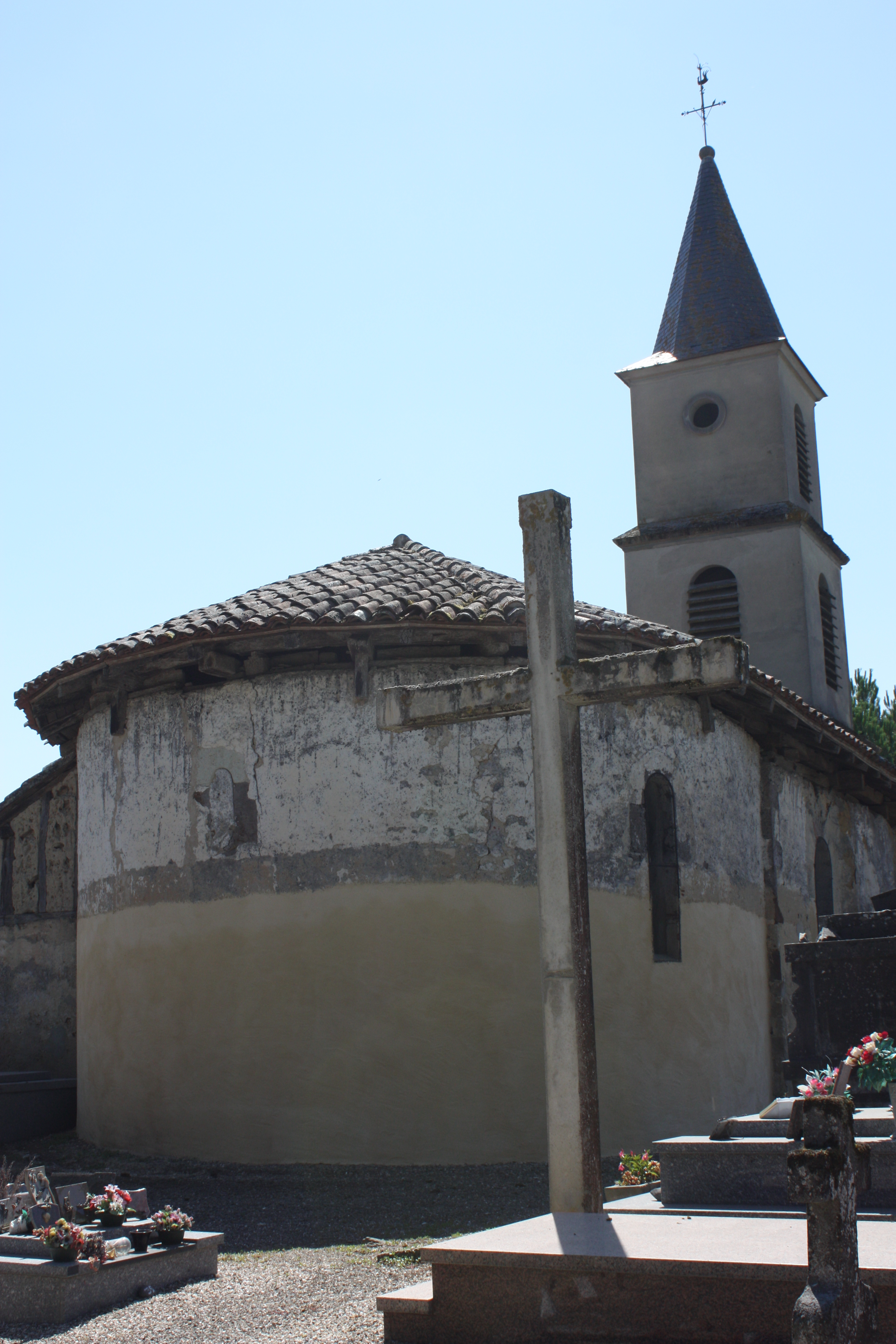
- The church in Noulens

- Coat of arms
- Location of Noulens
- Location within France Location within Occitanie
- Coordinates: 43°48′38″N 0°09′58″E
- Country: France
- Region: Occitania
- Department: Gers
- Arrondissement: Condom
- Canton: Fezensac

Government
  - Mayor (2020–2026): Sylvain Fontan
- Area^{1}: 5.74 km^{2} (2.22 sq mi)
- Elevation: 160 m (520 ft)
- Highest elevation: 196 m (643 ft)
- Lowest elevation: 132 m (433 ft)
- Population (2023): 100
  - Density: 17/km^{2} (45/sq mi)
- Time zone: UTC+01:00 (CET)
  - Summer (DST): UTC+02:00 (CEST)
- INSEE/Postal code: 32299 /32800
- ^{1} French Land Register data, which excludes lakes, ponds, glaciers > 1 km^{2} (0.386 sq mi or 247 acres) and river estuaries.

Noulens is a commune in the Gers department in southwestern France.

== Geography ==
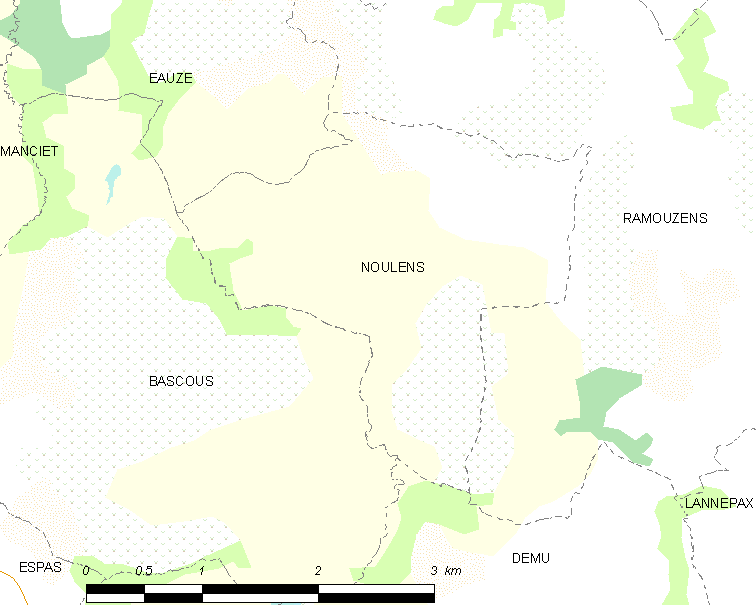
Noulens and its surrounding communes

== Population ==
Historical population
Year	Pop.	±% p.a.
1968	142	—
1975	124	−1.92%
1982	112	−1.44%
1990	114	+0.22%
1999	105	−0.91%
2007	99	−0.73%
2012	99	+0.00%
2017	104	+0.99%
2023	100	−0.65%
Source: INSEE

== See also ==
- Communes of the Gers department
