= Bazian =

- Commune
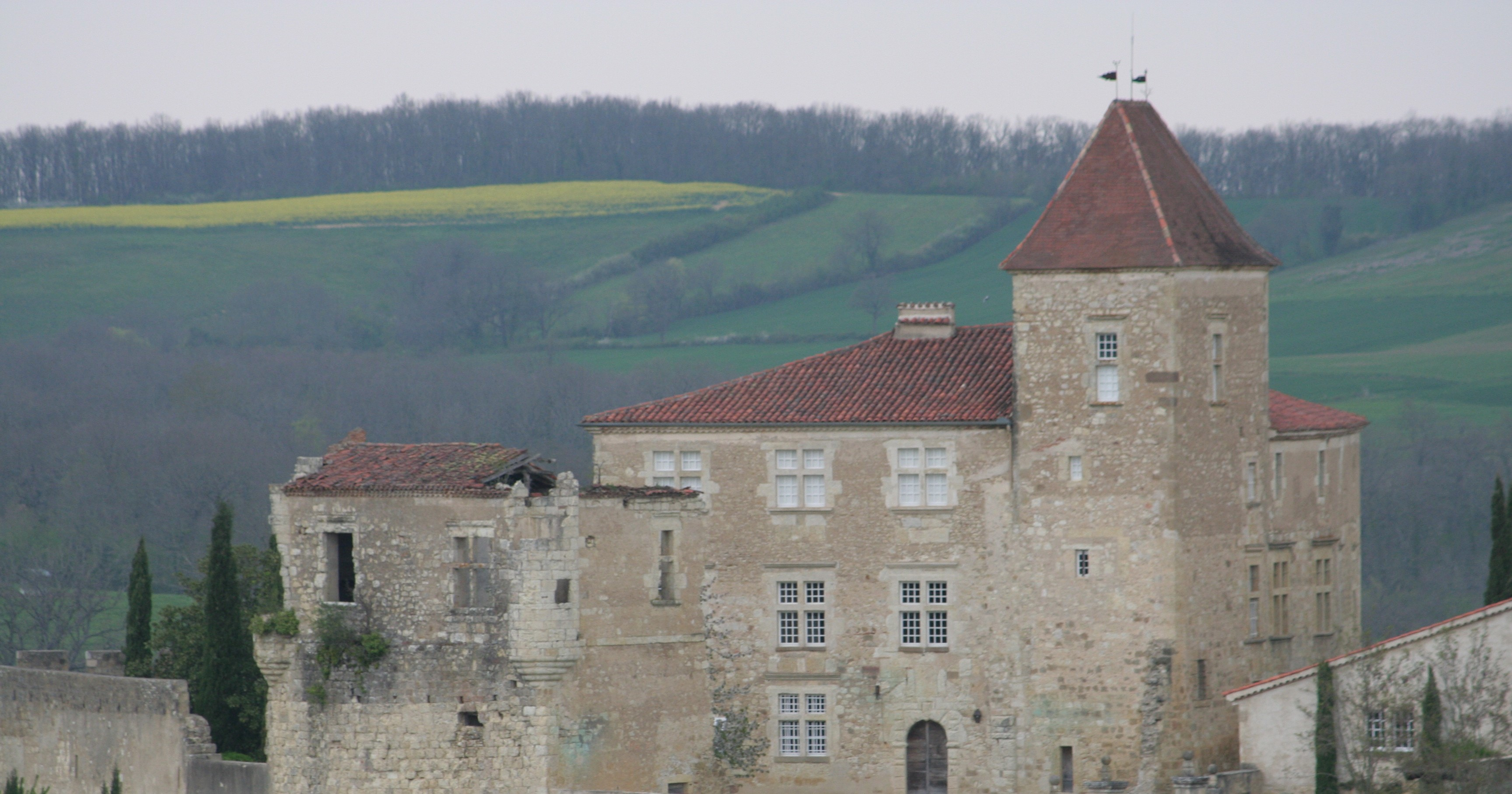
- Chateau
- Location of Bazian
- Location within France Location within Occitanie
- Coordinates: 43°40′13″N 0°19′23″E
- Country: France
- Region: Occitania
- Department: Gers
- Arrondissement: Auch
- Canton: Fezensac
- Intercommunality: Artagnan de Fézensac

Government
  - Mayor (2020–2026): Véronique Coelho
- Area^{1}: 12.71 km^{2} (4.91 sq mi)
- Elevation: 300 m (980 ft)
- Highest elevation: 234 m (768 ft)
- Lowest elevation: 126 m (413 ft)
- Population (2023): 97
  - Density: 7.6/km^{2} (20/sq mi)
- Time zone: UTC+01:00 (CET)
  - Summer (DST): UTC+02:00 (CEST)
- INSEE/Postal code: 32033 /32320
- ^{1} French Land Register data, which excludes lakes, ponds, glaciers > 1 km^{2} (0.386 sq mi or 247 acres) and river estuaries.

Bazian (French pronunciation: [bazjɑ̃]; Occitan: Basian) is a commune in the Gers department in southwestern France.

== Geography ==
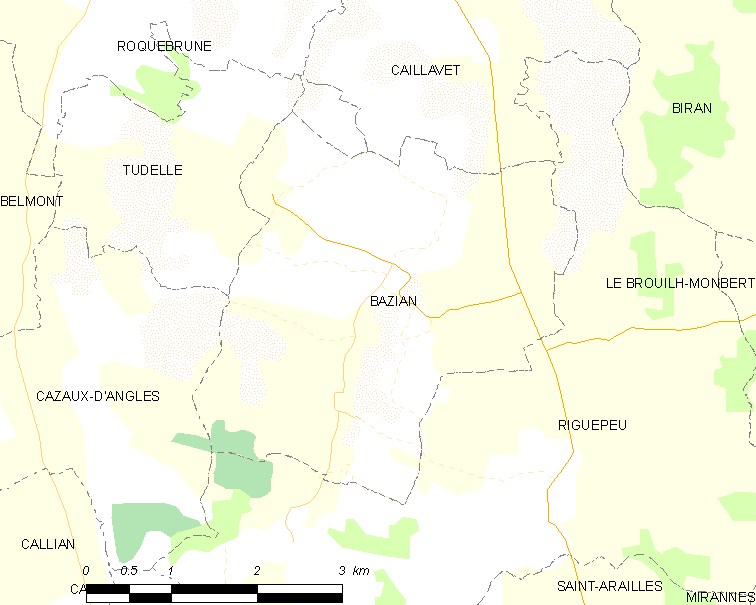
Bazian and its surrounding communes

== Population ==
Historical population
Year	Pop.	±% p.a.
1968	171	—
1975	133	−3.53%
1982	129	−0.44%
1990	114	−1.53%
1999	102	−1.23%
2007	110	+0.95%
2012	114	+0.72%
2017	112	−0.35%
2023	97	−2.37%
Source: INSEE

== See also ==
- Communes of the Gers department
