= Communes of the Gers department =

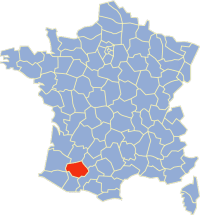

The following is a list of the 458 communes of the Gers department of France.

The communes cooperate in the following intercommunalities (as of 2025):

- Communauté d'agglomération Grand Auch Cœur de Gascogne
- Communauté de communes d'Aire-sur-l'Adour (partly)
- Communauté de communes Armagnac Adour
- Communauté de communes d'Artagnan de Fezensac
- Communauté de communes Astarac Arros en Gascogne
- Communauté de communes du Bas Armagnac
- Communauté de communes Bastides de Lomagne
- Communauté de communes Bastides et Vallons du Gers
- Communauté de communes Cœur d'Astarac en Gascogne
- Communauté de communes des Coteaux Arrats Gimone
- Communauté de communes des Deux Rives (partly)
- Communauté de communes de la Gascogne Toulousaine
- Communauté de communes du Grand Armagnac
- Communauté de communes de la Lomagne Gersoise
- Communauté de communes du Savès
- Communauté de communes de la Ténarèze
- Communauté de communes Val de Gers

INSEE code	Postal code	Commune
32001	32290	Aignan
32002	32270	Ansan
32003	32360	Antras
32004	32720	Arblade-le-Bas
32005	32110	Arblade-le-Haut
32007	32430	Ardizas
32008	32230	Armentieux
32009	32230	Armous-et-Cau
32010	32140	Arrouède
32012	32270	Aubiet
32013	32000	Auch
32014	32120	Augnax
32015	32300	Aujan-Mournède
32016	32600	Auradé
32017	32400	Aurensan
32018	32450	Aurimont
32468	32140	Aussos
32019	32550	Auterive
32020	32170	Aux-Aussat
32021	32120	Avensac
32022	32290	Avéron-Bergelle
32023	32380	Avezan
32024	32410	Ayguetinte
32025	32800	Ayzieu
32026	32120	Bajonnette
32027	32720	Barcelonne-du-Gers
32028	32170	Barcugnan
32029	32350	Barran
32030	32300	Bars
32031	32190	Bascous
32032	32320	Bassoues
32033	32320	Bazian
32034	32170	Bazugues
32035	32410	Beaucaire
32036	32160	Beaumarchés
32037	32100	Beaumont
32038	32600	Beaupuy
32039	32730	Beccas
32040	32450	Bédéchan
32041	32140	Bellegarde
32042	32300	Belloc-Saint-Clamens
32043	32190	Belmont
32044	32100	Béraut
32045	32300	Berdoues
32046	32400	Bernède
32047	32480	Berrac
32048	32420	Betcave-Aguin
32049	32110	Bétous
32050	32730	Betplan
32051	32130	Bézéril
32052	32310	Bezolles
32053	32140	Bézues-Bajon
32054	32350	Biran
32055	32380	Bivès
32056	32270	Blanquefort
32057	32100	Blaziert
32058	32230	Blousson-Sérian
32059	32410	Bonas
32060	32550	Boucagnères
32061	32450	Boulaur
32062	32370	Bourrouillan
32063	32290	Bouzon-Gellenave
32064	32800	Bretagne-d'Armagnac
32065	32350	Le Brouilh-Monbert
32066	32500	Brugnens
32068	32380	Cadeilhan
32069	32220	Cadeillan
32070	32400	Cahuzac-sur-Adour
32071	32190	Caillavet
32072	32190	Callian
32073	32800	Campagne-d'Armagnac
32365	32140	Cap d'Astarac
32075	32100	Cassaigne
32076	32450	Castelnau-Barbarens
32077	32320	Castelnau-d'Anglès
32078	32500	Castelnau-d'Arbieu
32079	32440	Castelnau-d'Auzan-Labarrère
32080	32100	Castelnau-sur-l'Auvignon
32081	32290	Castelnavet
32082	32700	Castéra-Lectourois
32083	32410	Castéra-Verduzan
32084	32380	Castéron
32085	32340	Castet-Arrouy
32086	32170	Castex
32087	32240	Castex-d'Armagnac
32088	32190	Castillon-Debats
32089	32360	Castillon-Massas
32090	32490	Castillon-Savès
32091	32810	Castin
32092	32200	Catonvielle
32093	32400	Caumont
32094	32110	Caupenne-d'Armagnac
32095	32100	Caussens
32096	32150	Cazaubon
32097	32190	Cazaux-d'Anglès
32098	32130	Cazaux-Savès
32099	32230	Cazaux-Villecomtal
32100	32800	Cazeneuve
32101	32500	Céran
32102	32410	Cézan
32103	32140	Chélan
32104	32300	Clermont-Pouyguillès
32105	32600	Clermont-Savès
32106	32430	Cologne
32107	32100	Condom
32108	32400	Corneillan
32109	32160	Couloumé-Mondebat
32110	32330	Courrensan
32111	32230	Courties
32112	32270	Crastes
32113	32110	Cravencères
32114	32300	Cuélas
32115	32190	Dému
32116	32170	Duffort
32117	32810	Duran
32118	32260	Durban
32119	32800	Eauze
32120	32430	Encausse
32121	32600	Endoufielle
32122	32140	Esclassan-Labastide
32123	32200	Escornebœuf
32124	32220	Espaon
32125	32370	Espas
32126	32170	Estampes
32127	32240	Estang
32128	32300	Estipouy
32129	32380	Estramiac
32130	32450	Faget-Abbatial
32131	32340	Flamarens
32132	32500	Fleurance
32133	32250	Fourcès
32134	32490	Frégouville
32135	32400	Fustérouau
32136	32160	Galiax
32138	32220	Garravet
32139	32380	Gaudonville
32140	32220	Gaujac
32141	32420	Gaujan
32142	32390	Gavarret-sur-Aulouste
32143	32480	Gazaupouy
32144	32230	Gazax-et-Baccarisse
32145	32720	Gée-Rivière
32146	32340	Gimbrède
32147	32200	Gimont
32148	32200	Giscaro
32149	32330	Gondrin
32150	32500	Goutz
32151	32400	Goux
32152	32730	Haget
32153	32550	Haulies
32154	32120	Homps
32155	32460	Le Houga
32156	32300	Idrac-Respaillès
32157	32270	L'Isle-Arné
32158	32380	L'Isle-Bouzon
32159	32300	L'Isle-de-Noé
32160	32600	L'Isle-Jourdain
32161	32400	Izotges
32162	32360	Jegun
32163	32160	Jû-Belloc
32164	32230	Juillac
32165	32200	Juilles
32166	32190	Justian
32167	32170	Laas
32169	32260	Labarthe
32170	32400	Labarthète
32171	32130	Labastide-Savès
32172	32300	Labéjan
32173	32120	Labrihe
32174	32230	Ladevèze-Rivière
32175	32230	Ladevèze-Ville
32176	32700	Lagarde
32177	32300	Lagarde-Hachan
32178	32310	Lagardère
32180	32330	Lagraulet-du-Gers
32181	32170	Laguian-Mazous
32182	32130	Lahas
32183	32810	Lahitte
32184	32500	Lalanne
32185	32140	Lalanne-Arqué
32186	32260	Lamaguère
32187	32300	Lamazère
32188	32500	Lamothe-Goas
32189	32240	Lannemaignan
32190	32190	Lannepax
32191	32110	Lanne-Soubiran
32192	32400	Lannux
32193	32150	Larée
32194	32100	Larressingle
32195	32480	Larroque-Engalin
32196	32410	Larroque-Saint-Sernin
32197	32100	Larroque-sur-l'Osse
32198	32450	Lartigue
32200	32550	Lasséran
32199	32160	Lasserrade
32201	32550	Lasseube-Propre
32202	32110	Laujuzan
32203	32330	Lauraët
32204	32360	Lavardens
32205	32230	Laveraët
32206	32220	Laymont
32207	32810	Leboulin
32208	32700	Lectoure
32209	32400	Lelin-Lapujolle
32210	32600	Lias
32211	32240	Lias-d'Armagnac
32212	32480	Ligardes
32213	32220	Lombez
32214	32110	Loubédat
32215	32300	Loubersan
32216	32140	Lourties-Monbrun
32217	32230	Louslitges
32218	32290	Loussous-Débat
32219	32290	Lupiac
32220	32110	Luppé-Violles
32221	32270	Lussan
32222	32110	Magnan
32223	32380	Magnas
32224	32310	Maignaut-Tauzia
32225	32730	Malabat
32226	32170	Manas-Bastanous
32227	32370	Manciet
32228	32140	Manent-Montané
32229	32120	Mansempuy
32230	32310	Mansencôme
32231	32190	Marambat
32232	32120	Maravat
32233	32230	Marciac
32234	32490	Marestaing
32235	32290	Margouët-Meymes

INSEE code	Postal code	Commune
32236	32150	Marguestau
32237	32270	Marsan
32238	32170	Marseillan
32239	32700	Marsolan
32240	32230	Mascaras
32241	32700	Mas-d'Auvignon
32242	32140	Masseube
32243	32240	Mauléon-d'Armagnac
32244	32400	Maulichères
32245	32400	Maumusson-Laguian
32246	32240	Maupas
32247	32200	Maurens
32248	32380	Mauroux
32249	32120	Mauvezin
32250	32420	Meilhan
32251	32360	Mérens
32252	32170	Miélan
32253	32340	Miradoux
32254	32300	Miramont-d'Astarac
32255	32390	Miramont-Latour
32256	32300	Mirande
32257	32350	Mirannes
32258	32390	Mirepoix
32261	32130	Monblanc
32262	32600	Monbrun
32263	32300	Moncassin
32264	32150	Monclar
32265	32300	Monclar-sur-Losse
32266	32260	Moncorneil-Grazan
32267	32260	Monferran-Plavès
32268	32490	Monferran-Savès
32269	32120	Monfort
32270	32220	Mongausy
32271	32240	Monguilhem
32272	32140	Monlaur-Bernet
32273	32230	Monlezun
32274	32240	Monlezun-d'Armagnac
32275	32170	Monpardiac
32276	32220	Montadet
32277	32220	Montamat
32278	32300	Montaut
32279	32810	Montaut-les-Créneaux
32280	32140	Mont-d'Astarac
32281	32170	Mont-de-Marrast
32282	32550	Montégut
32283	32730	Montégut-Arros
32284	32220	Montégut-Savès
32285	32320	Montesquiou
32286	32390	Montestruc-sur-Gers
32287	32420	Monties
32288	32200	Montiron
32289	32220	Montpézat
32290	32250	Montréal
32291	32240	Mormès
32292	32330	Mouchan
32293	32300	Mouchès
32294	32190	Mourède
32295	32130	Nizas
32296	32110	Nogaro
32297	32130	Noilhan
32298	32270	Nougaroulet
32299	32800	Noulens
32300	32260	Orbessan
32301	32350	Ordan-Larroque
32302	32260	Ornézan
32303	32230	Pallanne
32304	32140	Panassac
32305	32110	Panjas
32306	32500	Pauilhac
32307	32550	Pavie
32308	32130	Pébées
32309	32420	Pellefigue
32310	32460	Perchède
32311	32700	Pergain-Taillac
32312	32550	Pessan
32313	32380	Pessoulens
32314	32340	Peyrecave
32315	32320	Peyrusse-Grande
32316	32360	Peyrusse-Massas
32317	32230	Peyrusse-Vieille
32318	32500	Pis
32319	32160	Plaisance
32320	32340	Plieux
32321	32130	Polastron
32322	32130	Pompiac
32323	32300	Ponsampère
32324	32300	Ponsan-Soubiran
32325	32290	Pouydraguin
32326	32320	Pouylebon
32327	32260	Pouy-Loubrin
32328	32480	Pouy-Roquelaure
32329	32390	Préchac
32330	32160	Préchac-sur-Adour
32331	32810	Preignan
32332	32190	Préneron
32333	32400	Projan
32334	32600	Pujaudran
32335	32120	Puycasquier
32336	32220	Puylausic
32337	32390	Puységur
32338	32800	Ramouzens
32339	32600	Razengues
32340	32800	Réans
32341	32390	Réjaumont
32342	32230	Ricourt
32343	32320	Riguepeu
32344	32400	Riscle
32345	32480	La Romieu
32346	32190	Roquebrune
32347	32390	Roquefort
32348	32810	Roquelaure
32349	32430	Roquelaure-Saint-Aubin
32350	32100	Roquepine
32351	32310	Roques
32352	32190	Rozès
32353	32420	Sabaillan
32354	32290	Sabazan
32355	32170	Sadeillan
32356	32200	Saint-André
32358	32340	Saint-Antoine
32359	32120	Saint-Antonin
32360	32350	Saint-Arailles
32361	32300	Saint-Arroman
32362	32160	Saint-Aunix-Lengros
32364	32700	Saint-Avit-Frandat
32366	32120	Saint-Brès
32467	32200	Saint-Caprais
32367	32320	Saint-Christaud
32370	32380	Saint-Clar
32371	32380	Saint-Créac
32372	32430	Saint-Cricq
32357	32430	Sainte-Anne
32363	32300	Sainte-Aurence-Cazaux
32368	32390	Sainte-Christie
32369	32370	Sainte-Christie-d'Armagnac
32373	32170	Sainte-Dode
32376	32120	Sainte-Gemme
32374	32450	Saint-Élix-d'Astarac
32375	32300	Saint-Élix-Theux
32388	32200	Sainte-Marie
32395	32700	Sainte-Mère
32405	32500	Sainte-Radegonde
32377	32430	Saint-Georges
32378	32400	Saint-Germé
32379	32200	Saint-Germier
32380	32110	Saint-Griède
32381	32550	Saint-Jean-le-Comtal
32382	32190	Saint-Jean-Poutge
32383	32230	Saint-Justin
32384	32360	Saint-Lary
32385	32380	Saint-Léonard
32386	32220	Saint-Lizier-du-Planté
32387	32220	Saint-Loube
32389	32300	Saint-Martin
32390	32110	Saint-Martin-d'Armagnac
32391	32480	Saint-Martin-de-Goyne
32392	32450	Saint-Martin-Gimois
32393	32300	Saint-Maur
32394	32300	Saint-Médard
32396	32700	Saint-Mézard
32397	32300	Saint-Michel
32398	32400	Saint-Mont
32399	32120	Saint-Orens
32400	32100	Saint-Orens-Pouy-Petit
32401	32300	Saint-Ost
32402	32190	Saint-Paul-de-Baïse
32403	32290	Saint-Pierre-d'Aubézies
32404	32310	Saint-Puy
32406	32270	Saint-Sauvy
32407	32220	Saint-Soulan
32408	32370	Salles-d'Armagnac
32409	32140	Samaran
32410	32130	Samatan
32411	32260	Sansan
32412	32450	Saramon
32414	32400	Sarragachies
32415	32170	Sarraguzan
32416	32120	Sarrant
32417	32500	La Sauvetat
32418	32220	Sauveterre
32419	32300	Sauviac
32420	32220	Sauvimont
32421	32130	Savignac-Mona
32422	32230	Scieurac-et-Flourès
32423	32190	Séailles
32424	32400	Ségos
32425	32600	Ségoufielle
32426	32260	Seissan
32427	32230	Sembouès
32428	32450	Sémézies-Cachan
32429	32700	Sempesserre
32430	32140	Sère
32431	32120	Sérempuy
32432	32130	Seysses-Savès
32433	32420	Simorre
32434	32110	Sion
32435	32430	Sirac
32436	32120	Solomiac
32437	32110	Sorbets
32438	32260	Tachoires
32439	32400	Tarsac
32440	32160	Tasque
32441	32120	Taybosc
32443	32400	Termes-d'Armagnac
32442	32700	Terraube
32444	32430	Thoux
32445	32160	Tieste-Uragnoux
32446	32170	Tillac
32447	32450	Tirent-Pontéjac
32448	32430	Touget
32449	32240	Toujouse
32450	32230	Tourdun
32451	32420	Tournan
32452	32380	Tournecoupe
32453	32390	Tourrenquets
32454	32450	Traversères
32455	32230	Troncens
32456	32190	Tudelle
32457	32500	Urdens
32458	32110	Urgosse
32459	32310	Valence-sur-Baïse
32460	32720	Vergoignan
32461	32400	Verlus
32462	32190	Vic-Fezensac
32463	32400	Viella
32464	32730	Villecomtal-sur-Arros
32465	32420	Villefranche
32466	32300	Viozan
