= Bédéchan =

- Commune
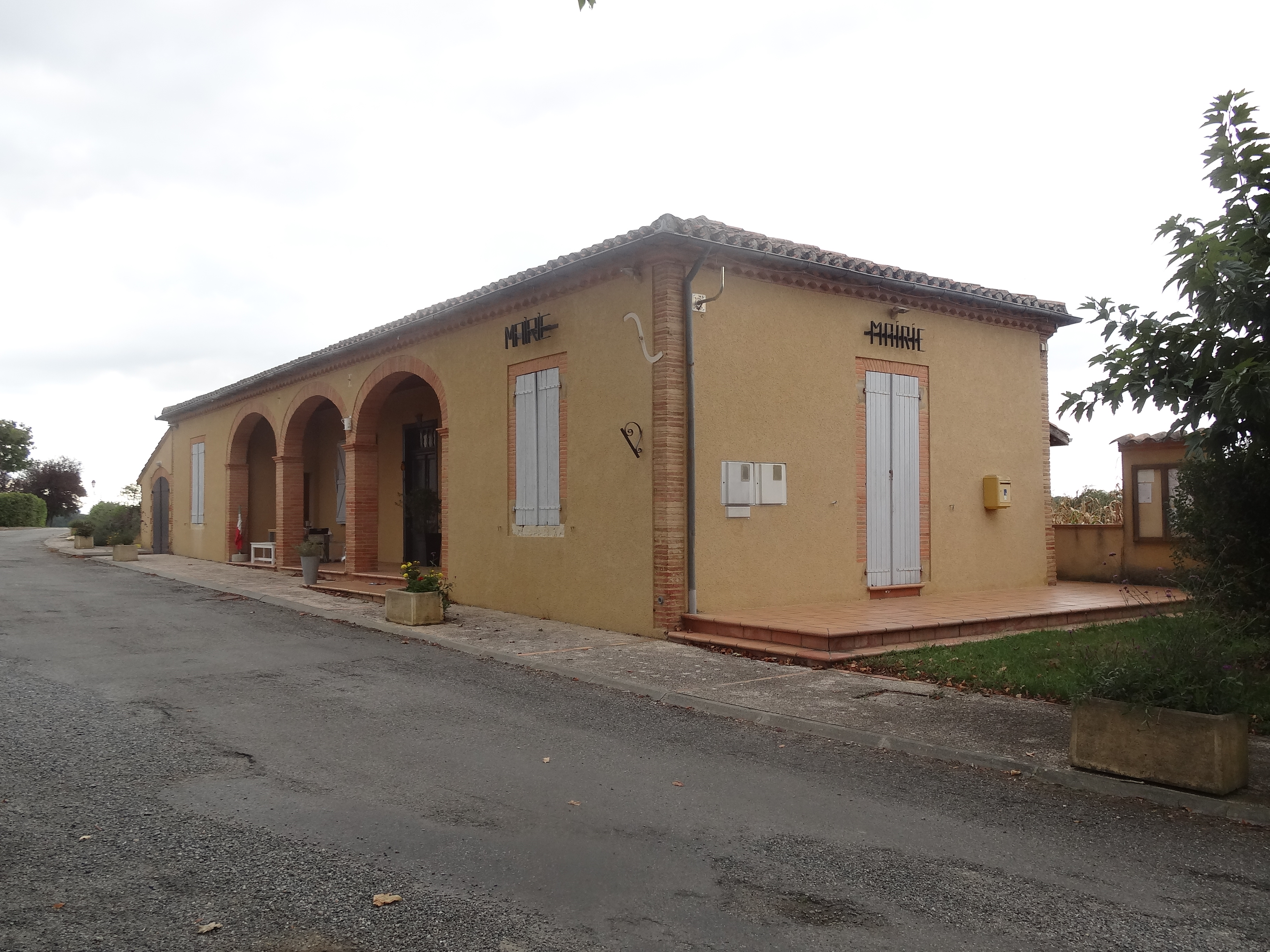
- The town hall in Bédéchan

- Coat of arms
- Location of Bédéchan
- Location within France Location within Occitanie
- Coordinates: 43°34′25″N 0°48′02″E
- Country: France
- Region: Occitania
- Department: Gers
- Arrondissement: Auch
- Canton: Astarac-Gimone

Government
  - Mayor (2020–2026): Jacqueline Loussignian
- Area^{1}: 7.84 km^{2} (3.03 sq mi)
- Elevation: 250 m (820 ft)
- Highest elevation: 262 m (860 ft)
- Lowest elevation: 157 m (515 ft)
- Population (2023): 135
  - Density: 17.2/km^{2} (44.6/sq mi)
- Time zone: UTC+01:00 (CET)
  - Summer (DST): UTC+02:00 (CEST)
- INSEE/Postal code: 32040 /32450
- ^{1} French Land Register data, which excludes lakes, ponds, glaciers > 1 km^{2} (0.386 sq mi or 247 acres) and river estuaries.

Bédéchan (French pronunciation: [bedeʃɑ̃]; Gascon: Bedeishan) is a commune in the Gers department in southwestern France.

== Geography ==
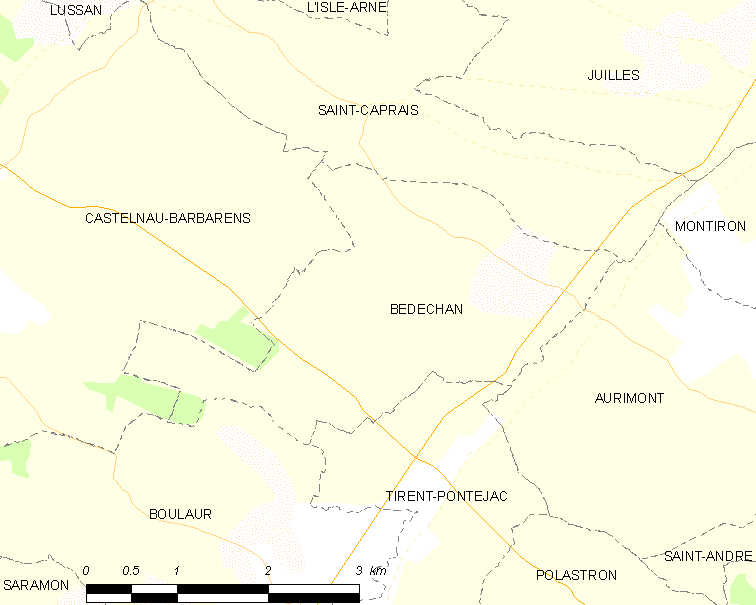
Bédéchan and its surrounding communes

== Population ==
Historical population
Year	Pop.	±% p.a.
1968	118	—
1975	107	−1.39%
1982	102	−0.68%
1990	107	+0.60%
1999	104	−0.32%
2007	133	+3.12%
2012	141	+1.18%
2017	152	+1.51%
2023	135	−1.96%
Source: INSEE

== See also ==
- Communes of the Gers department
