= Roquebrune, Gers =

Roquebrune
- Commune
- Location of Roquebrune
- Location within France Location within Occitanie
- Coordinates: 43°43′18″N 0°18′02″E
- Country: France
- Region: Occitania
- Department: Gers
- Arrondissement: Auch
- Canton: Fezensac
- Intercommunality: Artagnan en Fézensac

Government
  - Mayor (2020–2026): Benoît Desenlis
- Area^{1}: 18.41 km^{2} (7.11 sq mi)
- Elevation: 170 m (560 ft)
- Highest elevation: 215 m (705 ft)
- Lowest elevation: 115 m (377 ft)
- Population (2023): 207
  - Density: 11.2/km^{2} (29.1/sq mi)
- Time zone: UTC+01:00 (CET)
  - Summer (DST): UTC+02:00 (CEST)
- INSEE/Postal code: 32346 /32190
- ^{1} French Land Register data, which excludes lakes, ponds, glaciers > 1 km^{2} (0.386 sq mi or 247 acres) and river estuaries.

Roquebrune (French pronunciation: [ʁɔkbʁyn]; Gascon: Ròcabruna) is a commune in the Gers department in southwestern France.

== Geography ==
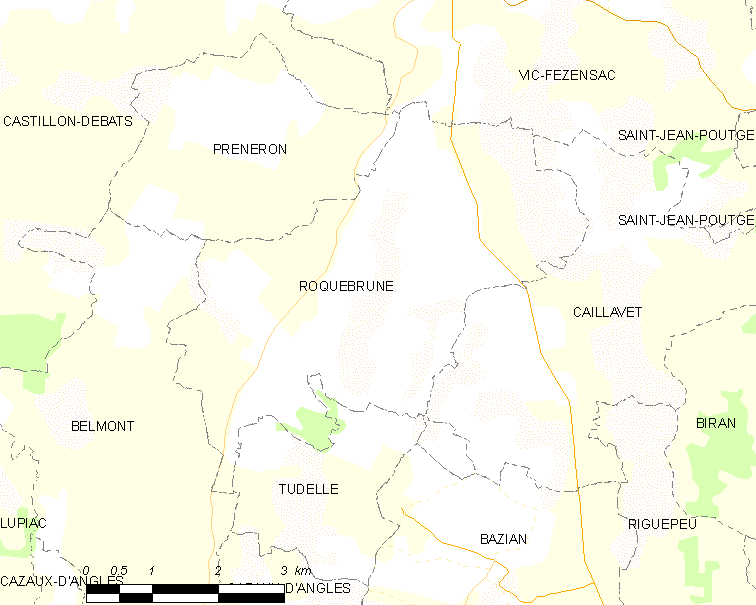
Roquebrune and its surrounding communes

== Population ==
Historical population
Year	Pop.	±% p.a.
1968	274	—
1975	235	−2.17%
1982	190	−2.99%
1990	197	+0.45%
1999	187	−0.58%
2007	192	+0.33%
2012	200	+0.82%
2017	213	+1.27%
2023	207	−0.48%
Source: INSEE

== See also ==
- Communes of the Gers department
