= Tudelle =

- Commune
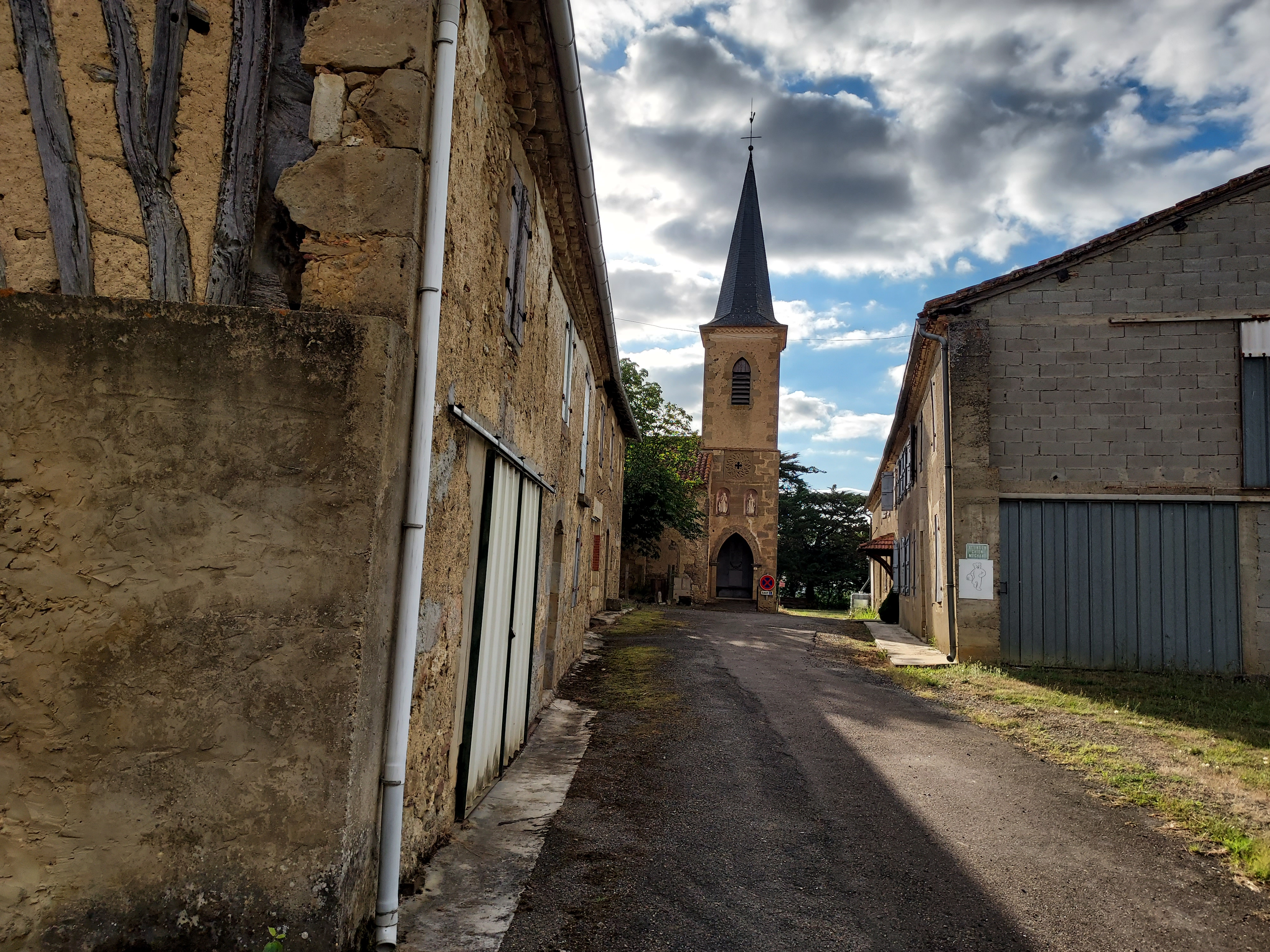
- Location of Tudelle
- Location within France Location within Occitanie
- Coordinates: 43°41′N 0°17′E
- Country: France
- Region: Occitania
- Department: Gers
- Arrondissement: Auch
- Canton: Fezensac
- Intercommunality: Artagnan en Fézensac

Government
  - Mayor (2020–2026): Daniel Peres
- Area^{1}: 5.16 km^{2} (1.99 sq mi)
- Elevation: 210 m (690 ft)
- Highest elevation: 228 m (748 ft)
- Lowest elevation: 127 m (417 ft)
- Population (2023): 56
  - Density: 11/km^{2} (28/sq mi)
- Time zone: UTC+01:00 (CET)
  - Summer (DST): UTC+02:00 (CEST)
- INSEE/Postal code: 32456 /32190
- ^{1} French Land Register data, which excludes lakes, ponds, glaciers > 1 km^{2} (0.386 sq mi or 247 acres) and river estuaries.

Tudelle (French pronunciation: [tydɛl]; Occitan: Tudèla) is a commune in the Gers department in southwestern France.

== Geography ==
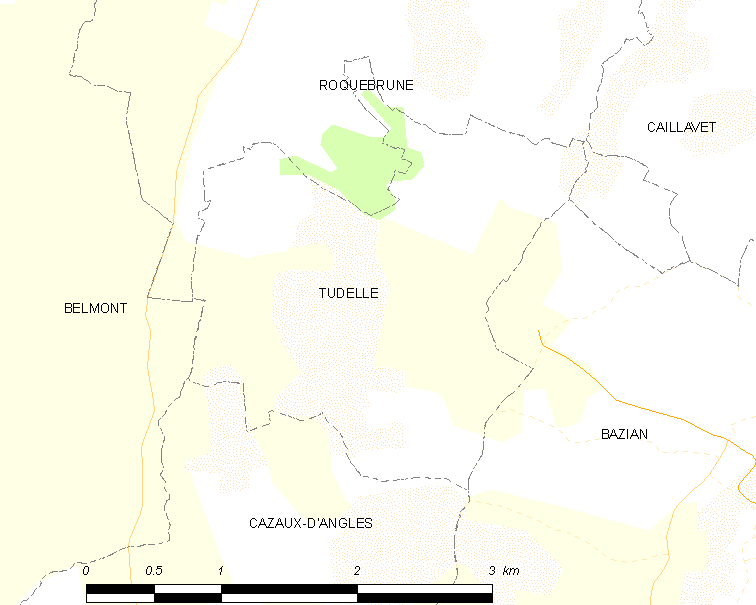
Tudelle and its surrounding communes

== Population ==
Historical population
Year	Pop.	±% p.a.
1968	55	—
1975	57	+0.51%
1982	55	−0.51%
1990	52	−0.70%
1999	63	+2.16%
2007	67	+0.77%
2012	60	−2.18%
2017	59	−0.34%
2023	56	−0.87%
Source: INSEE

== See also ==
- Communes of the Gers department
