= L'Isle-Arné =

- Commune
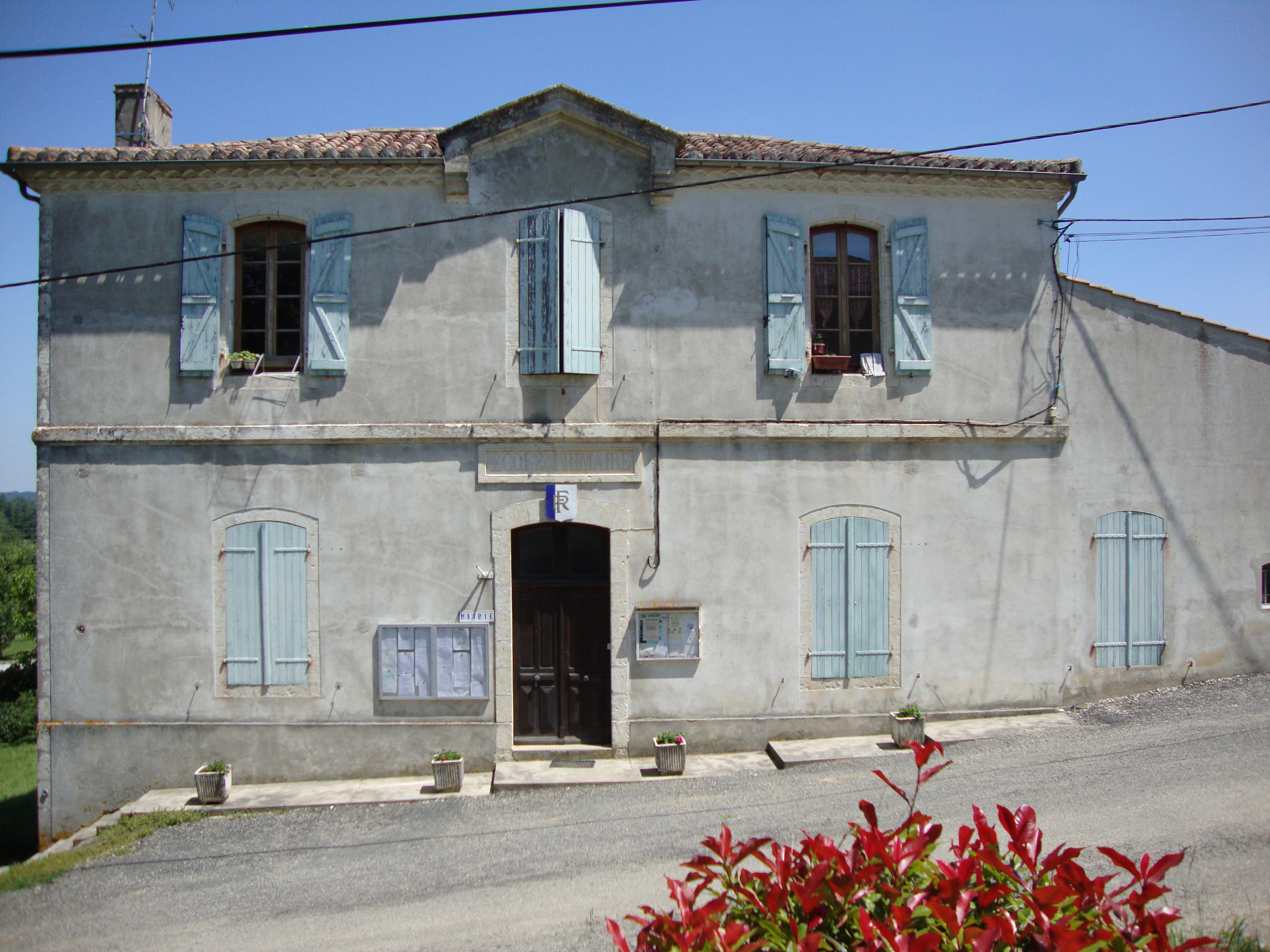
- The town hall in L'Isle-Arné

- Coat of arms
- Location of L'Isle-Arné
- Location within France Location within Occitanie
- Coordinates: 43°36′59″N 0°46′19″E
- Country: France
- Region: Occitania
- Department: Gers
- Arrondissement: Auch
- Canton: Auch-2

Government
  - Mayor (2020–2026): Sébastien Ghion
- Area^{1}: 6.97 km^{2} (2.69 sq mi)
- Elevation: 155 m (509 ft)
- Highest elevation: 234 m (768 ft)
- Lowest elevation: 149 m (489 ft)
- Population (2023): 180
  - Density: 26/km^{2} (67/sq mi)
- Time zone: UTC+01:00 (CET)
  - Summer (DST): UTC+02:00 (CEST)
- INSEE/Postal code: 32157 /32270
- ^{1} French Land Register data, which excludes lakes, ponds, glaciers > 1 km^{2} (0.386 sq mi or 247 acres) and river estuaries.

L'Isle-Arné (French pronunciation: [lil aʁne]; Occitan: La Ileta e Arnès) is a commune in the Gers department in southwestern France.

== Geography ==
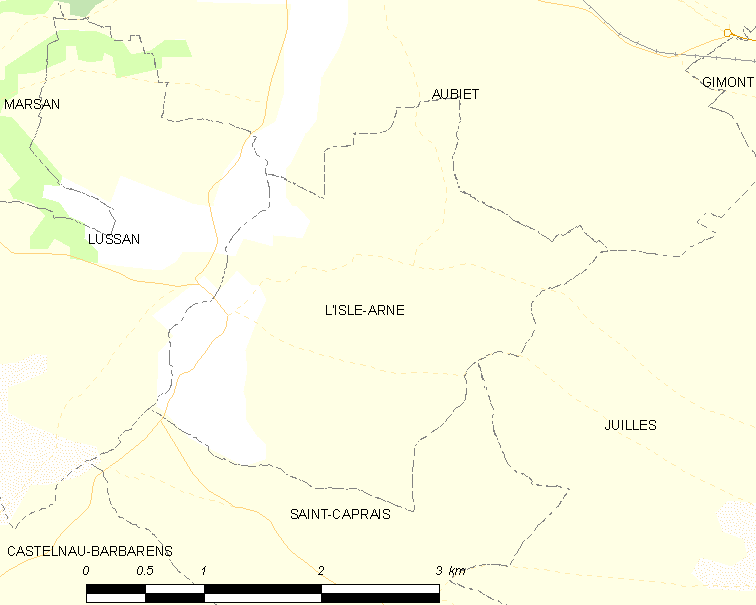
L'Isle-Arné and its surrounding communes

== Population ==
Historical population
| Year | Pop. | ±% p.a. |
|---|---|---|
| 1968 | 108 | — |
| 1975 | 101 | −0.95% |
| 1982 | 101 | +0.00% |
| 1990 | 83 | −2.42% |
| 1999 | 82 | −0.13% |
| 2007 | 115 | +4.32% |
| 2012 | 158 | +6.56% |
| 2017 | 180 | +2.64% |
| 2023 | 180 | +0.00% |
Source: INSEE

== See also ==
- Communes of the Gers department
