= Rozès =

- Commune
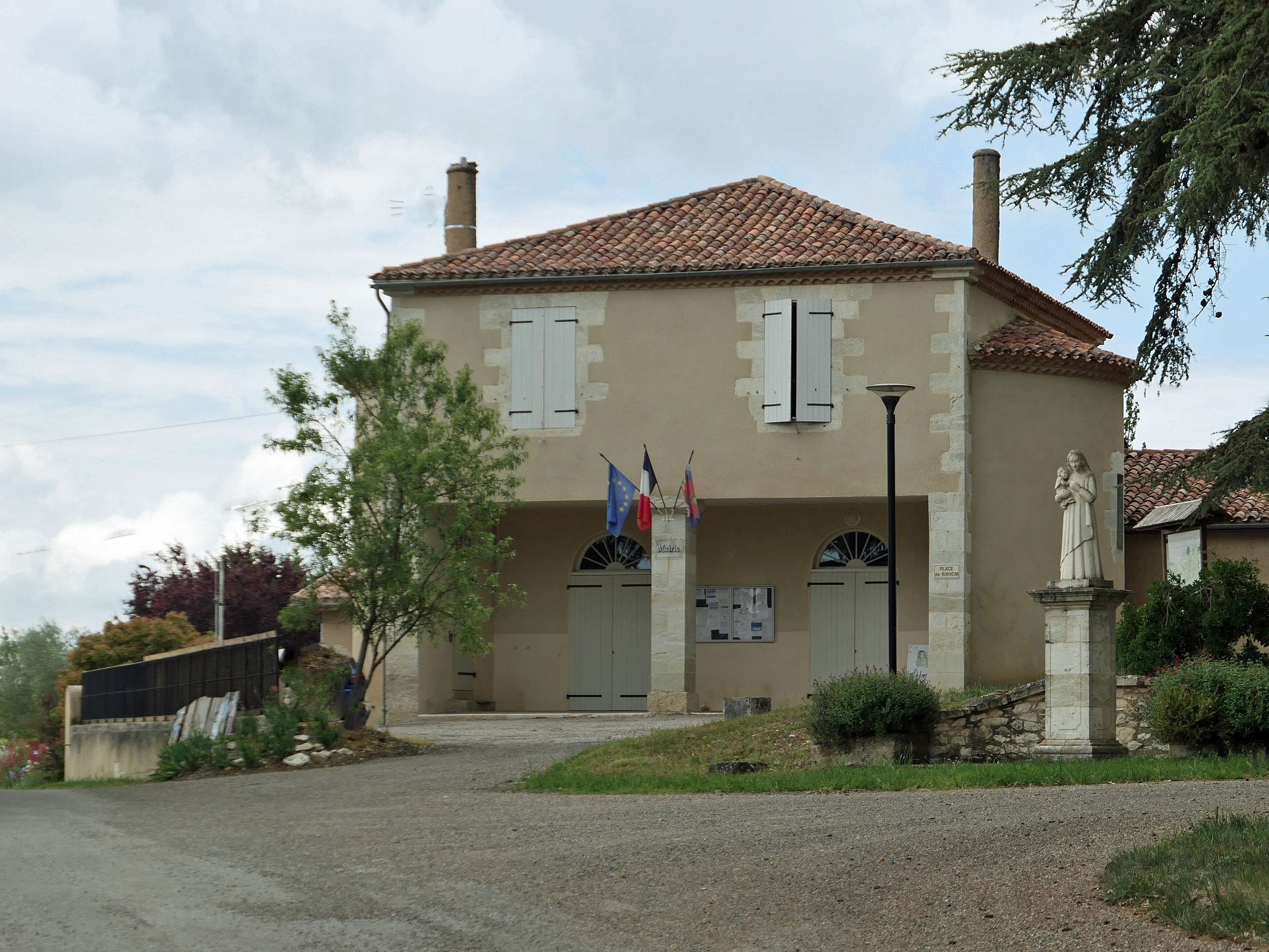
- Town hall
- Location of Rozès
- Location within France Location within Occitanie
- Coordinates: 43°48′31″N 0°22′16″E
- Country: France
- Region: Occitania
- Department: Gers
- Arrondissement: Auch
- Canton: Fezensac
- Intercommunality: Artagnan en Fézensac

Government
  - Mayor (2020–2026): Isabelle Caillavet
- Area^{1}: 10.74 km^{2} (4.15 sq mi)
- Elevation: 192 m (630 ft)
- Highest elevation: 214 m (702 ft)
- Lowest elevation: 94 m (308 ft)
- Population (2023): 113
  - Density: 10.5/km^{2} (27.3/sq mi)
- Time zone: UTC+01:00 (CET)
  - Summer (DST): UTC+02:00 (CEST)
- INSEE/Postal code: 32352 /32190
- ^{1} French Land Register data, which excludes lakes, ponds, glaciers > 1 km^{2} (0.386 sq mi or 247 acres) and river estuaries.

Rozès (French pronunciation: [ʁozɛs]; Occitan: Rosers or Rosés) is a commune in the Gers department in southwestern France.

== Geography ==
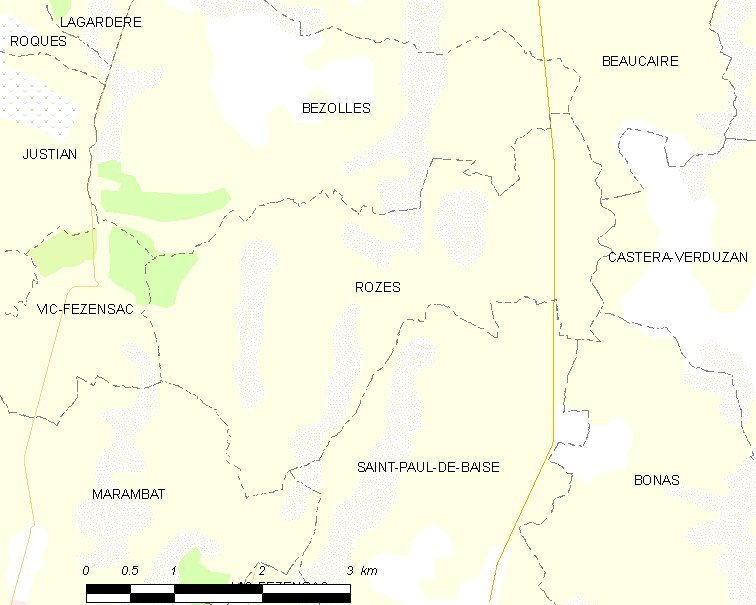
Roquepine and its surrounding communes

== Population ==
Historical population
Year	Pop.	±% p.a.
1968	143	—
1975	112	−3.43%
1982	108	−0.52%
1990	103	−0.59%
1999	109	+0.63%
2007	126	+1.83%
2012	124	−0.32%
2017	124	+0.00%
2023	113	−1.54%
Source: INSEE

== See also ==
- Communes of the Gers department
