= Ramouzens =

- Commune
- Location of Ramouzens
- Location within France Location within Occitanie
- Coordinates: 43°48′51″N 0°11′10″E
- Country: France
- Region: Occitania
- Department: Gers
- Arrondissement: Condom
- Canton: Fezensac

Government
  - Mayor (2020–2026): Jacques Chabreuil
- Area^{1}: 16.67 km^{2} (6.44 sq mi)
- Elevation: 264 m (866 ft)
- Highest elevation: 215 m (705 ft)
- Lowest elevation: 132 m (433 ft)
- Population (2023): 190
  - Density: 11/km^{2} (30/sq mi)
- Time zone: UTC+01:00 (CET)
  - Summer (DST): UTC+02:00 (CEST)
- INSEE/Postal code: 32338 /32800
- ^{1} French Land Register data, which excludes lakes, ponds, glaciers > 1 km^{2} (0.386 sq mi or 247 acres) and river estuaries.

Ramouzens is a commune in the Gers department in southwestern France.

== Geography ==
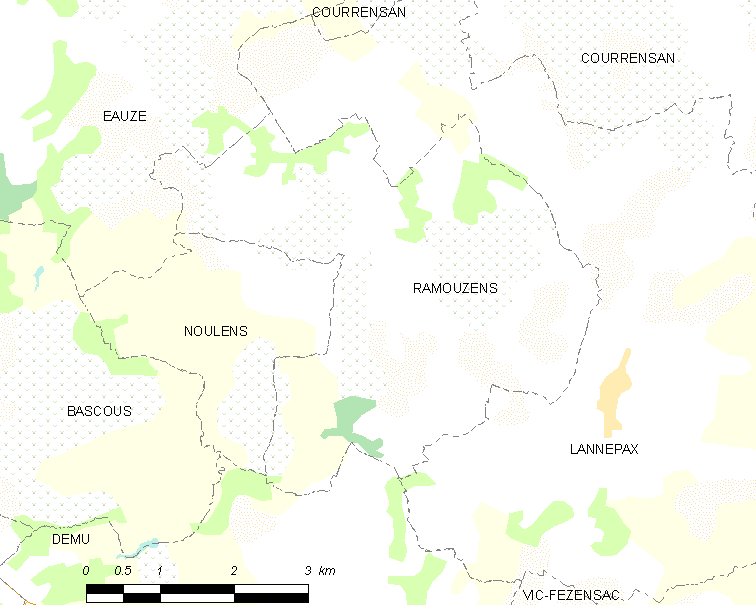
Ramouzens and its surrounding communes

== Population ==
Historical population
Year	Pop.	±% p.a.
1968	218	—
1975	191	−1.87%
1982	193	+0.15%
1990	193	+0.00%
1999	175	−1.08%
2007	154	−1.59%
2012	144	−1.33%
2017	163	+2.51%
2023	190	+2.59%
Source: INSEE

== See also ==
- Communes of the Gers department
