= Marambat =

- Commune
- Coat of arms
- Location of Marambat
- Location within France Location within Occitanie
- Coordinates: 43°46′37″N 0°18′54″E
- Country: France
- Region: Occitania
- Department: Gers
- Arrondissement: Auch
- Canton: Fezensac
- Intercommunality: Artagnan en Fézensac

Government
  - Mayor (2020–2026): Sandrine Brossard
- Area^{1}: 9.7 km^{2} (3.7 sq mi)
- Elevation: 107 m (351 ft)
- Highest elevation: 224 m (735 ft)
- Lowest elevation: 103 m (338 ft)
- Population (2023): 419
  - Density: 43/km^{2} (110/sq mi)
- Time zone: UTC+01:00 (CET)
  - Summer (DST): UTC+02:00 (CEST)
- INSEE/Postal code: 32231 /32190
- ^{1} French Land Register data, which excludes lakes, ponds, glaciers > 1 km^{2} (0.386 sq mi or 247 acres) and river estuaries.

Marambat (French pronunciation: [maʁɑ̃ba]; Occitan: Maranvath) is a commune in the Gers department in southwestern France.

== Geography ==
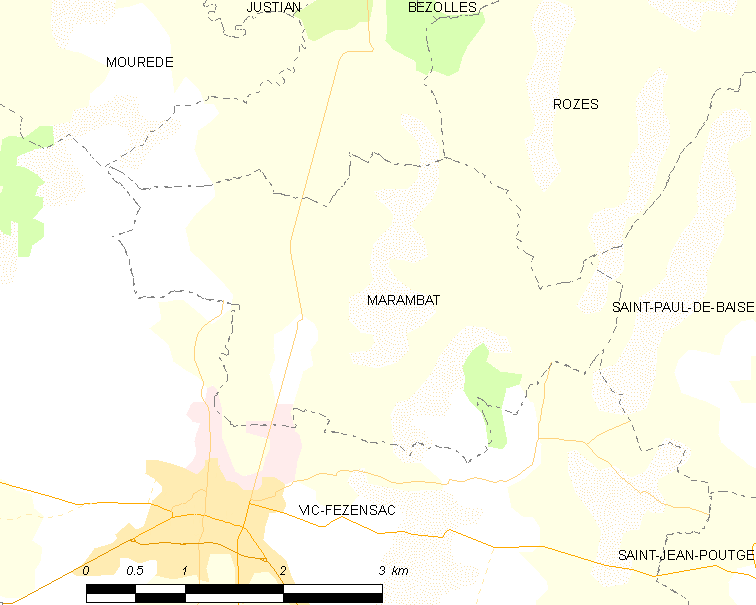
Marambat and its surrounding communes

== Population ==
Historical population
Year	Pop.	±% p.a.
1968	184	—
1975	210	+1.91%
1982	281	+4.25%
1990	315	+1.44%
1999	327	+0.42%
2007	380	+1.90%
2012	455	+3.67%
2017	442	−0.58%
2023	419	−0.89%
Source: INSEE

== See also ==
- Communes of the Gers department
