= Saint-Pierre-d'Aubézies =

- Commune
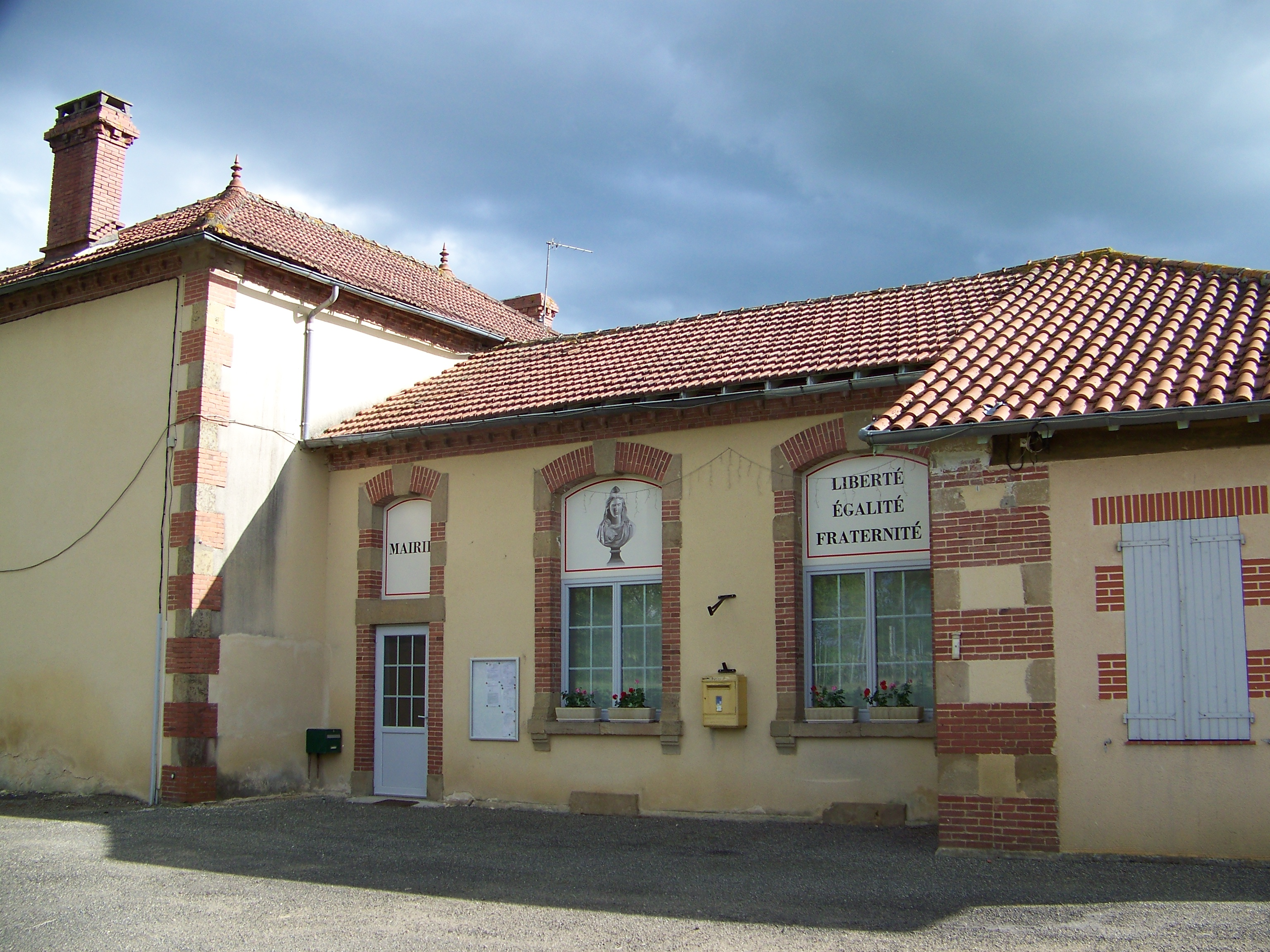
- Town hall
- Location of Saint-Pierre-d'Aubézies
- Location within France Location within Occitanie
- Coordinates: 43°38′40″N 0°10′01″E
- Country: France
- Region: Occitania
- Department: Gers
- Arrondissement: Auch
- Canton: Fezensac
- Intercommunality: Artagnan en Fézensac

Government
  - Mayor (2020–2026): Robert Paché
- Area^{1}: 8.42 km^{2} (3.25 sq mi)
- Elevation: 222 m (728 ft)
- Highest elevation: 245 m (804 ft)
- Lowest elevation: 131 m (430 ft)
- Population (2023): 60
  - Density: 7.1/km^{2} (18/sq mi)
- Time zone: UTC+01:00 (CET)
  - Summer (DST): UTC+02:00 (CEST)
- INSEE/Postal code: 32403 /32290
- ^{1} French Land Register data, which excludes lakes, ponds, glaciers > 1 km^{2} (0.386 sq mi or 247 acres) and river estuaries.

Saint-Pierre-d'Aubézies (Gascon: Sent Pèr d'Auvesias) is a commune in the Gers department in southwestern France in the Occitania region. Historically and culturally, the commune has been a part of the Rivière-Basse region. A territory that stretches into the middle valley of Adour at a point where the river makes the bend between Bigorre and Gers.

It is exposed to the oceanic climate, it is drained by the Douze and Petit Midour and various other small waterways. It is composed of two zones of remakable ecological, floral and faunal interest.

Saint-Pierre-d'Aubézies is a rural place with 59 inhabitants in the year 2022 after hitting a population peak 338 inhabitants in 1846. The habitants call themselves the Saint-Pierrois or Saint-Pierroises.

== Geography ==
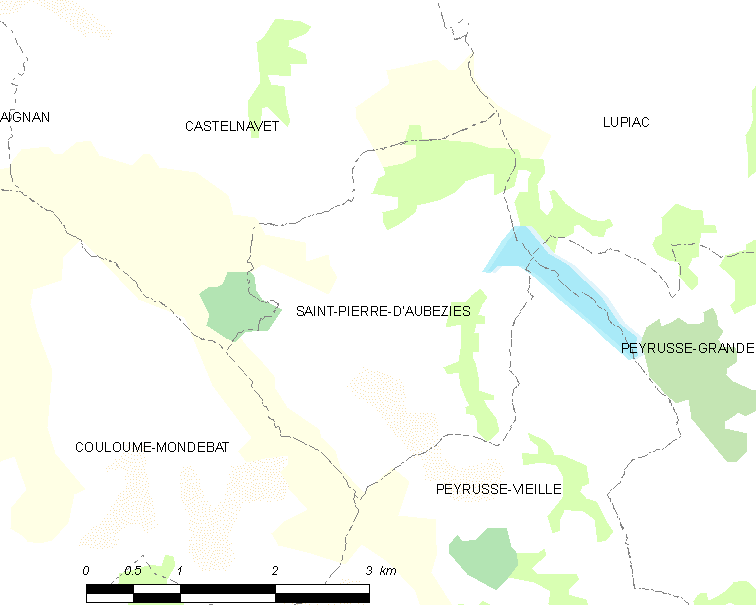
Saint-Pierre-d'Aubézies and its surrounding communes

== Population ==
Historical population
Year	Pop.	±% p.a.
1968	108	—
1975	105	−0.40%
1982	93	−1.72%
1990	85	−1.12%
1999	74	−1.53%
2007	76	+0.33%
2012	75	−0.26%
2017	67	−2.23%
2023	60	−1.82%
Source: INSEE

== See also ==
- Communes of the Gers department
