= Séailles =

- Commune
- Location of Séailles
- Location within France Location within Occitanie
- Coordinates: 43°45′10″N 0°06′39″E
- Country: France
- Region: Occitania
- Department: Gers
- Arrondissement: Condom
- Canton: Fezensac

Government
  - Mayor (2020–2026): Laurent Sanchez
- Area^{1}: 8.11 km^{2} (3.13 sq mi)
- Elevation: 196 m (643 ft)
- Highest elevation: 212 m (696 ft)
- Lowest elevation: 126 m (413 ft)
- Population (2023): 70
  - Density: 8.6/km^{2} (22/sq mi)
- Time zone: UTC+01:00 (CET)
  - Summer (DST): UTC+02:00 (CEST)
- INSEE/Postal code: 32423 /32190
- ^{1} French Land Register data, which excludes lakes, ponds, glaciers > 1 km^{2} (0.386 sq mi or 247 acres) and river estuaries.

Séailles (French pronunciation: [seaj]; Occitan: Sealhas) is a commune in the Gers department in southwestern France.

== Geography ==
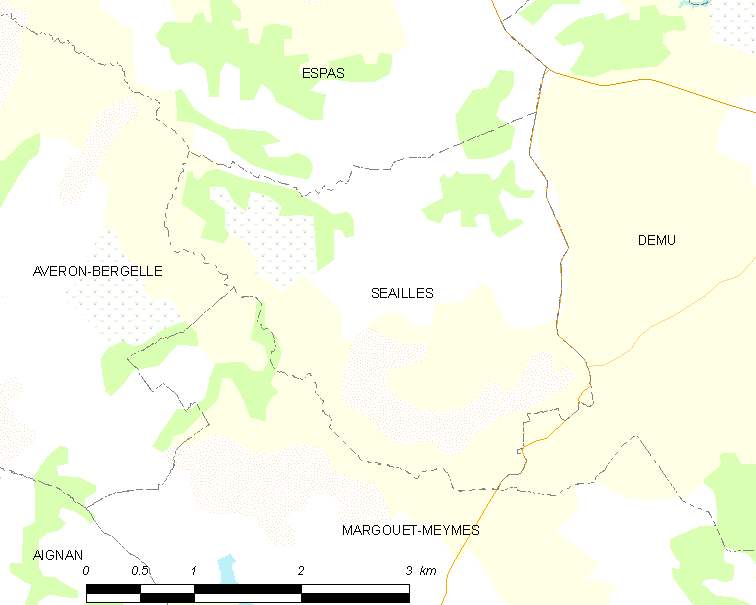
Séailles and its surrounding communes

== Population ==
Historical population
Year	Pop.	±% p.a.
1968	84	—
1975	68	−2.97%
1982	62	−1.31%
1990	72	+1.89%
1999	64	−1.30%
2007	59	−1.01%
2012	66	+2.27%
2017	45	−7.37%
2023	70	+7.64%
Source: INSEE

== See also ==
- Communes of the Gers department
