= Canton of Fezensac =

Administrative division of Gers department, France

Coordinates: 43.76°N 0.30°E

The canton of Fezensac is an administrative division of the Gers department, southwestern France. It was created at the French canton reorganisation which came into effect in March 2015. Its seat is in Vic-Fezensac.

It consists of the following communes:

1. Bascous
2. Bazian
3. Belmont
4. Bezolles
5. Caillavet
6. Callian
7. Castillon-Debats
8. Cazaux-d'Anglès
9. Courrensan
10. Dému
11. Gazax-et-Baccarisse
12. Justian
13. Lannepax
14. Lupiac
15. Marambat
16. Mirannes
17. Mourède
18. Noulens
19. Peyrusse-Grande
20. Peyrusse-Vieille
21. Préneron
22. Ramouzens
23. Riguepeu
24. Roquebrune
25. Roques
26. Rozès
27. Saint-Arailles
28. Saint-Jean-Poutge
29. Saint-Paul-de-Baïse
30. Saint-Pierre-d'Aubézies
31. Séailles
32. Tudelle
33. Vic-Fezensac
