= Mourède =

- Commune
- Location of Mourède
- Location within France Location within Occitanie
- Coordinates: 43°48′03″N 0°17′49″E
- Country: France
- Region: Occitania
- Department: Gers
- Arrondissement: Auch
- Canton: Fezensac

Government
  - Mayor (2020–2026): Philippe Cantan
- Area^{1}: 4.88 km^{2} (1.88 sq mi)
- Elevation: 128 m (420 ft)
- Highest elevation: 166 m (545 ft)
- Lowest elevation: 99 m (325 ft)
- Population (2023): 70
  - Density: 14/km^{2} (37/sq mi)
- Time zone: UTC+01:00 (CET)
  - Summer (DST): UTC+02:00 (CEST)
- INSEE/Postal code: 32294 /32190
- ^{1} French Land Register data, which excludes lakes, ponds, glaciers > 1 km^{2} (0.386 sq mi or 247 acres) and river estuaries.

Mourède (French pronunciation: [muʁɛd]; Occitan: Moreda) is a commune in the Gers department in southwestern France.

== Geography ==
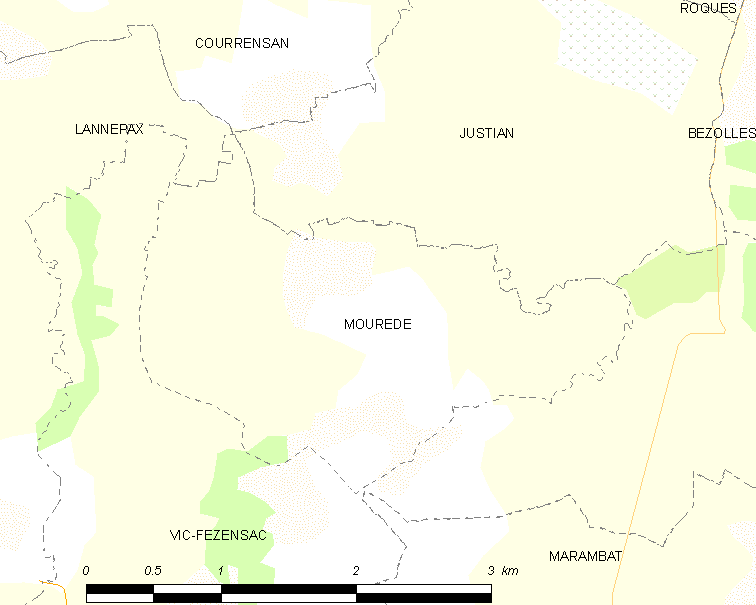
Mourède and its surrounding communes

== Population ==
Historical population
Year	Pop.	±% p.a.
1968	90	—
1975	95	+0.78%
1982	80	−2.43%
1990	80	+0.00%
1999	69	−1.63%
2007	80	+1.87%
2012	86	+1.46%
2017	86	+0.00%
2023	70	−3.37%
Source: INSEE

== See also ==
- Communes of the Gers department
