= Sémézies-Cachan =

- Commune
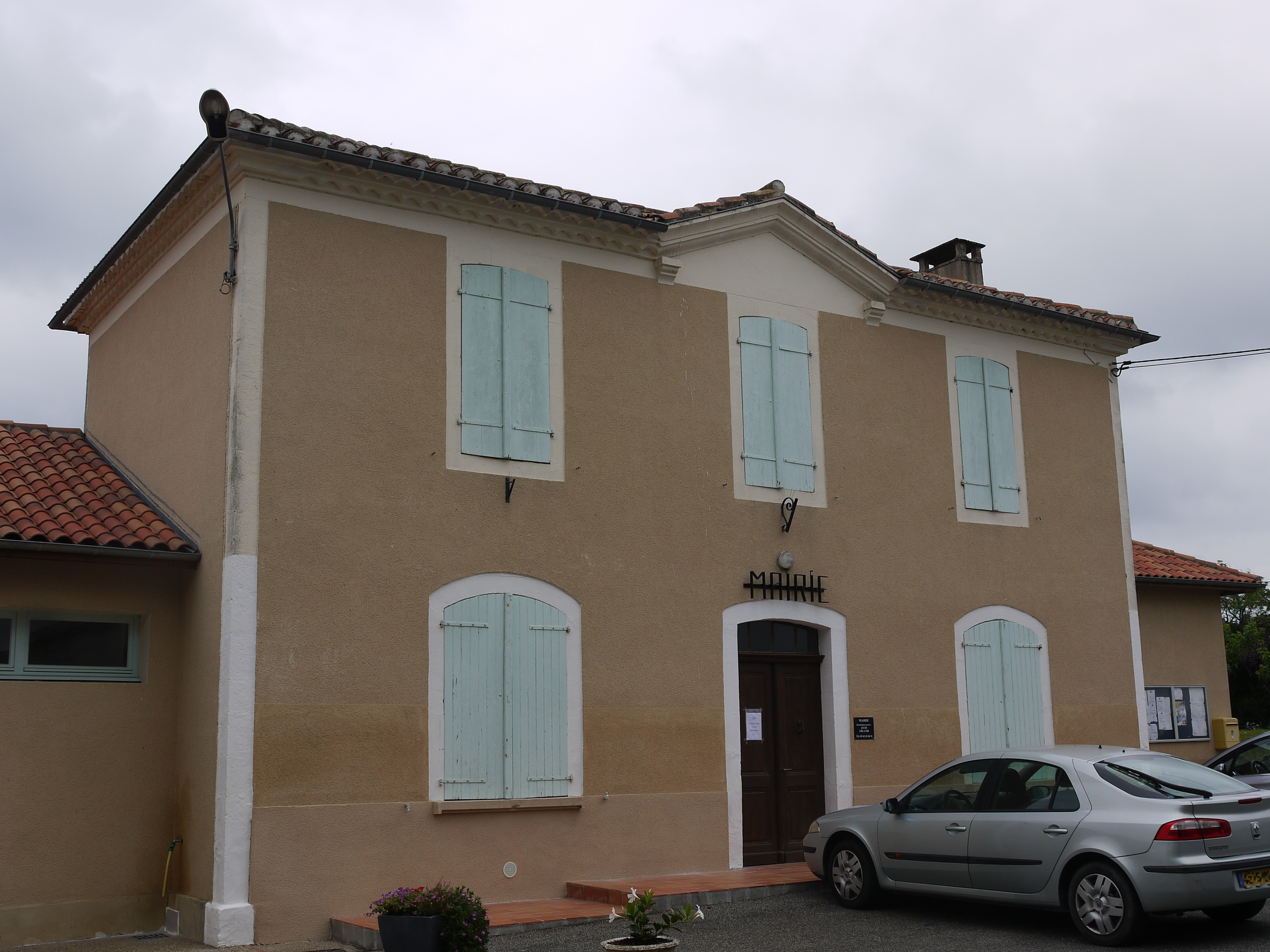
- The town hall in Sémézies-Cachan
- Location of Sémézies-Cachan
- Location within France Location within Occitanie
- Coordinates: 43°30′39″N 0°43′55″E
- Country: France
- Region: Occitania
- Department: Gers
- Arrondissement: Auch
- Canton: Astarac-Gimone

Government
  - Mayor (2020–2026): Paul Burgan
- Area^{1}: 6.95 km^{2} (2.68 sq mi)
- Elevation: 230 m (750 ft)
- Highest elevation: 281 m (922 ft)
- Lowest elevation: 177 m (581 ft)
- Population (2023): 53
  - Density: 7.6/km^{2} (20/sq mi)
- Time zone: UTC+01:00 (CET)
  - Summer (DST): UTC+02:00 (CEST)
- INSEE/Postal code: 32428 /32450
- ^{1} French Land Register data, which excludes lakes, ponds, glaciers > 1 km^{2} (0.386 sq mi or 247 acres) and river estuaries.

Sémézies-Cachan (French pronunciation: [semezi kaʃɑ̃]; Occitan: Semesias e Caishan) is a commune in the Gers department in southwestern France.

== Geography ==
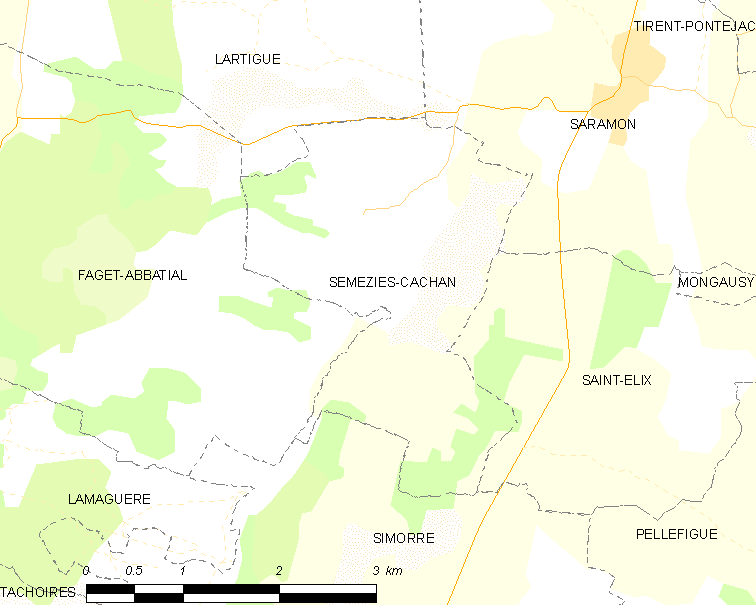
Sémézies-Cachan and its surrounding communes

== Population ==
Historical population
Year	Pop.	±% p.a.
1968	125	—
1975	98	−3.42%
1982	80	−2.86%
1990	71	−1.48%
1999	75	+0.61%
2007	78	+0.49%
2012	69	−2.42%
2017	66	−0.89%
2023	53	−3.59%
Source: INSEE

== See also ==
- Communes of the Gers department
