= Gazax-et-Baccarisse =

- Commune
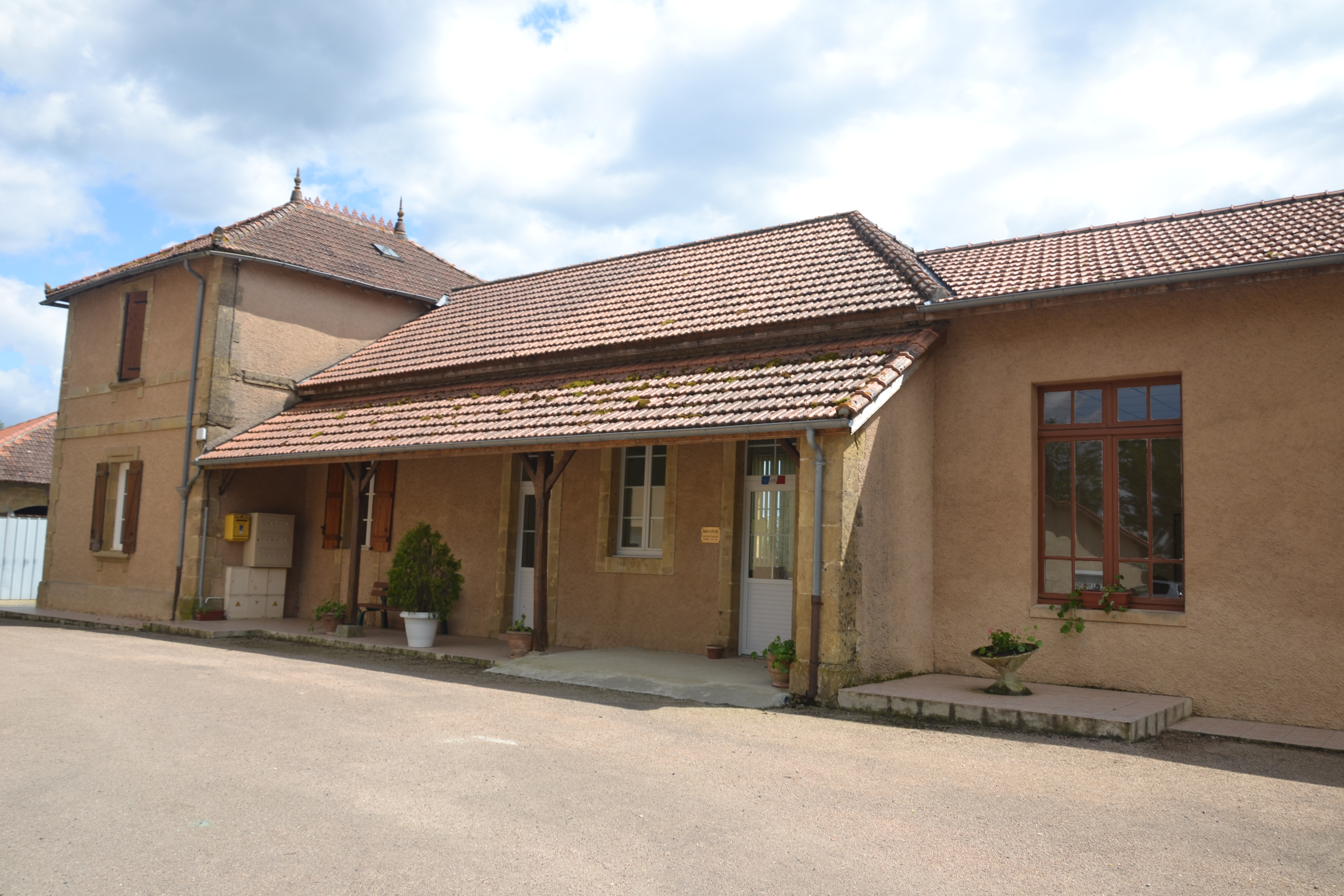
- The town hall in Gazax
- Location of Gazax-et-Baccarisse
- Location within France Location within Occitanie
- Coordinates: 43°36′32″N 0°11′33″E
- Country: France
- Region: Occitania
- Department: Gers
- Arrondissement: Auch
- Canton: Fezensac
- Intercommunality: Artagnan en Fézensac

Government
  - Mayor (2024–2026): Stéphane Liviero
- Area^{1}: 9.45 km^{2} (3.65 sq mi)
- Highest elevation: 276 m (906 ft)
- Lowest elevation: 154 m (505 ft)
- Population (2023): 72
  - Density: 7.6/km^{2} (20/sq mi)
- Time zone: UTC+01:00 (CET)
  - Summer (DST): UTC+02:00 (CEST)
- INSEE/Postal code: 32144 /32230
- ^{1} French Land Register data, which excludes lakes, ponds, glaciers > 1 km^{2} (0.386 sq mi or 247 acres) and river estuaries.

Gazax-et-Baccarisse is a commune in the Gers department in southwestern France.

== Geography ==
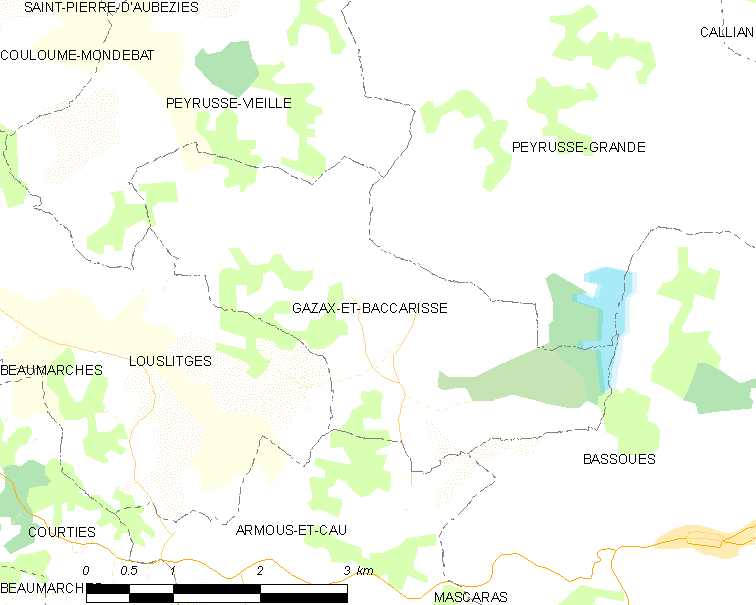
Gazax-et-Baccarisse and its surrounding communes

== Population ==
Historical population
Year	Pop.	±% p.a.
1968	119	—
1975	115	−0.49%
1982	129	+1.65%
1990	106	−2.42%
1999	99	−0.76%
2007	95	−0.51%
2012	83	−2.66%
2017	80	−0.73%
2023	72	−1.74%
Source: INSEE

== See also ==
- Communes of the Gers department
