= Bezolles =

- Commune
- Location of Bezolles
- Location within France Location within Occitanie
- Coordinates: 43°49′27″N 0°21′05″E
- Country: France
- Region: Occitania
- Department: Gers
- Arrondissement: Auch
- Canton: Fezensac

Government
  - Mayor (2020–2026): Daniel Darroux
- Area^{1}: 11.13 km^{2} (4.30 sq mi)
- Elevation: 204 m (669 ft)
- Highest elevation: 222 m (728 ft)
- Lowest elevation: 93 m (305 ft)
- Population (2023): 129
  - Density: 11.6/km^{2} (30.0/sq mi)
- Time zone: UTC+01:00 (CET)
  - Summer (DST): UTC+02:00 (CEST)
- INSEE/Postal code: 32052 /32310
- ^{1} French Land Register data, which excludes lakes, ponds, glaciers > 1 km^{2} (0.386 sq mi or 247 acres) and river estuaries.

Bezolles (French pronunciation: [bəzɔl]; Occitan: Besòlas) is a commune in the Gers department in southwestern France.

== Geography ==
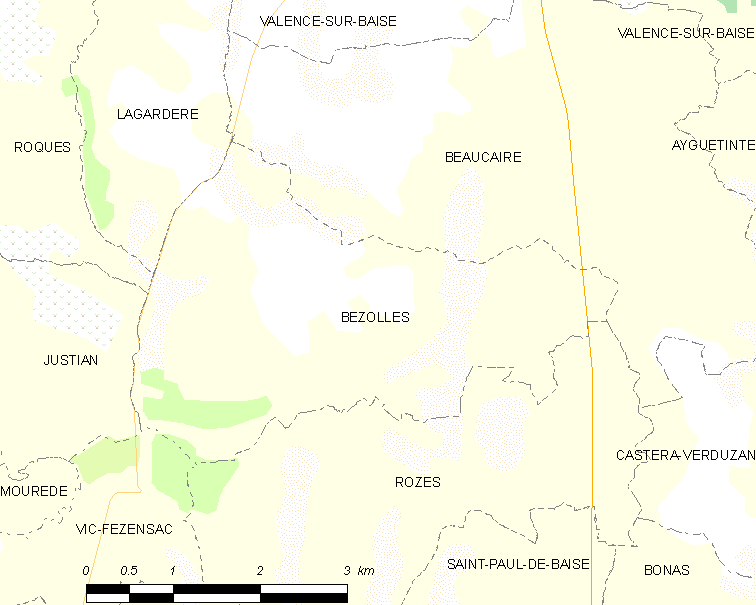
Bezolles and its surrounding communes

== Population ==
Historical population

Year	Pop.	±% p.a.
1793	500	—
1800	418	−2.53%
1806	418	+0.00%
1821	417	−0.02%
1831	528	+2.39%
1841	550	+0.41%
1846	477	−2.81%
1851	502	+1.03%
1856	442	−2.51%
1861	459	+0.76%
1866	461	+0.09%
1872	418	−1.62%
1876	418	+0.00%
1881	450	+1.49%
1886	432	−0.81%
1891	378	−2.64%
1896	362	−0.86%
1901	354	−0.45%

Year	Pop.	±% p.a.
1906	337	−0.98%
1911	320	−1.03%
1921	253	−2.32%
1926	262	+0.70%
1931	263	+0.08%
1936	278	+1.12%
1946	251	−1.02%
1954	241	−0.51%
1962	205	−2.00%
1968	196	−0.75%
1975	187	−0.67%
1982	153	−2.83%
1990	135	−1.55%
1999	156	+1.62%
2007	141	−1.26%
2012	139	−0.29%
2017	139	+0.00%
2023	129	−1.24%

Source: EHESS and INSEE (1968-2023)

== See also ==
- Communes of the Gers department
