= Caillavet, Gers =

Caillavet
- Commune
- Location of Caillavet
- Location within France Location within Occitanie
- Coordinates: 43°42′47″N 0°19′57″E
- Country: France
- Region: Occitania
- Department: Gers
- Arrondissement: Auch
- Canton: Fezensac
- Intercommunality: Artagnan en Fézensac

Government
  - Mayor (2020–2026): Gérard Mimalé
- Area^{1}: 14.58 km^{2} (5.63 sq mi)
- Elevation: 175 m (574 ft)
- Highest elevation: 225 m (738 ft)
- Lowest elevation: 110 m (360 ft)
- Population (2023): 162
  - Density: 11.1/km^{2} (28.8/sq mi)
- Time zone: UTC+01:00 (CET)
  - Summer (DST): UTC+02:00 (CEST)
- INSEE/Postal code: 32071 /32190
- ^{1} French Land Register data, which excludes lakes, ponds, glaciers > 1 km^{2} (0.386 sq mi or 247 acres) and river estuaries.

Caillavet (French pronunciation: [kajavɛ]; Occitan: Calhavèth) is a commune in the Gers department in southwestern France.

== Geography ==
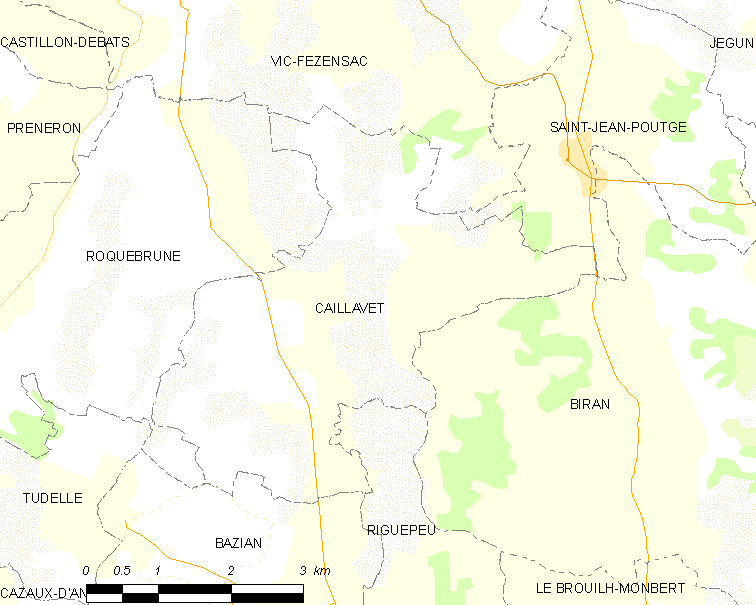
Caillavet and its surrounding communes

== Population ==
Historical population
Year	Pop.	±% p.a.
1968	194	—
1975	159	−2.80%
1982	188	+2.42%
1990	179	−0.61%
1999	164	−0.97%
2007	192	+1.99%
2012	193	+0.10%
2017	204	+1.11%
2023	162	−3.77%
Source: INSEE

== See also ==
- Communes of the Gers department
