= Callian, Gers =

Callian
- Commune
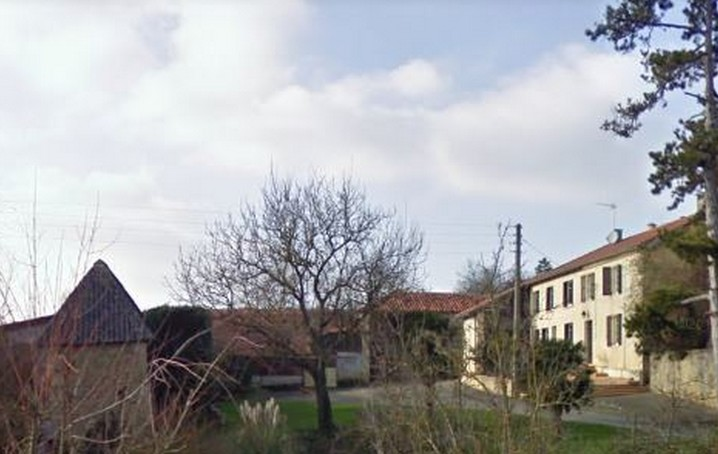
- A view within Callian
- Location of Callian
- Location within France Location within Occitanie
- Coordinates: 43°37′47″N 0°16′42″E
- Country: France
- Region: Occitania
- Department: Gers
- Arrondissement: Auch
- Canton: Fezensac
- Intercommunality: Artagnan en Fézensac

Government
  - Mayor (2020–2026): Philippe Ducès
- Area^{1}: 7.91 km^{2} (3.05 sq mi)
- Elevation: 235 m (771 ft)
- Highest elevation: 227 m (745 ft)
- Lowest elevation: 137 m (449 ft)
- Population (2023): 55
  - Density: 7.0/km^{2} (18/sq mi)
- Time zone: UTC+01:00 (CET)
  - Summer (DST): UTC+02:00 (CEST)
- INSEE/Postal code: 32072 /32190
- ^{1} French Land Register data, which excludes lakes, ponds, glaciers > 1 km^{2} (0.386 sq mi or 247 acres) and river estuaries.

Callian (French pronunciation: [kaljɑ̃]; Occitan: Calhan) is a commune in the Gers department in southwestern France.

== Geography ==
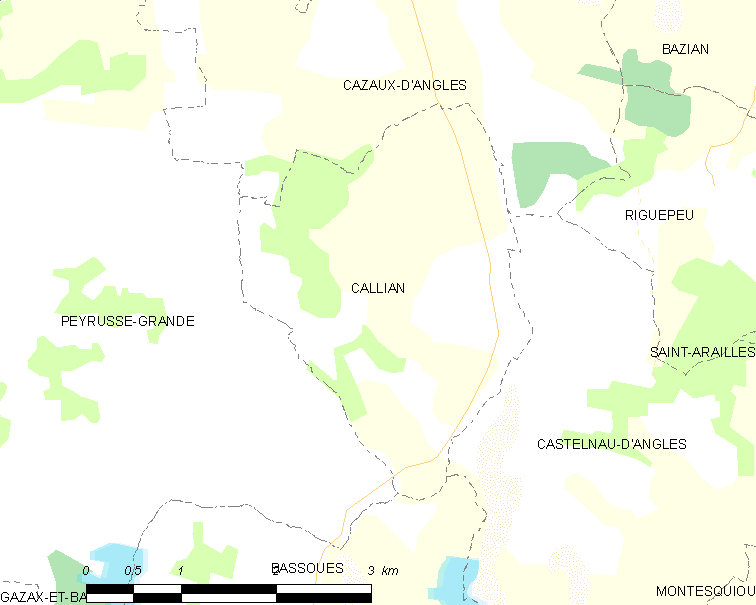
Callian and its surrounding communes

== Population ==
Historical population
Year	Pop.	±% p.a.
1968	78	—
1975	67	−2.15%
1982	60	−1.56%
1990	59	−0.21%
1999	50	−1.82%
2007	51	+0.25%
2012	44	−2.91%
2017	47	+1.33%
2023	55	+2.65%
Source: INSEE

== See also ==
- Communes of the Gers department
