= Saint-Arroman =

Saint-Arroman may refer to the following places in France:

- Saint-Arroman, Gers, a commune in the Gers department
- Saint-Arroman, Hautes-Pyrénées, a commune in the Hautes-Pyrénées department
