= Samaran =

Samaran may refer to:

- Waray-Waray language
- Samaran, Gers, a commune of France in the department of Gers
- Samaran (film), a 2012 film
