= Labarthe =

Labarthe may refer to the following places in France:

- Labarthe, Gers, a commune in the Gers department
- Labarthe, Tarn-et-Garonne, a commune in the Tarn-et-Garonne department
