= Montlaur =

Montlaur may refer to:

== Places ==
Montlaur is the name or part of the name of several communes in France:

- Montlaur, in the Aude department
- Montlaur, in the Aveyron department
- Montlaur, in the Haute-Garonne department
- Montlaur-en-Diois, in the Drôme department
- Monlaur-Bernet, in the Gers department
