= Panassac =

- Commune
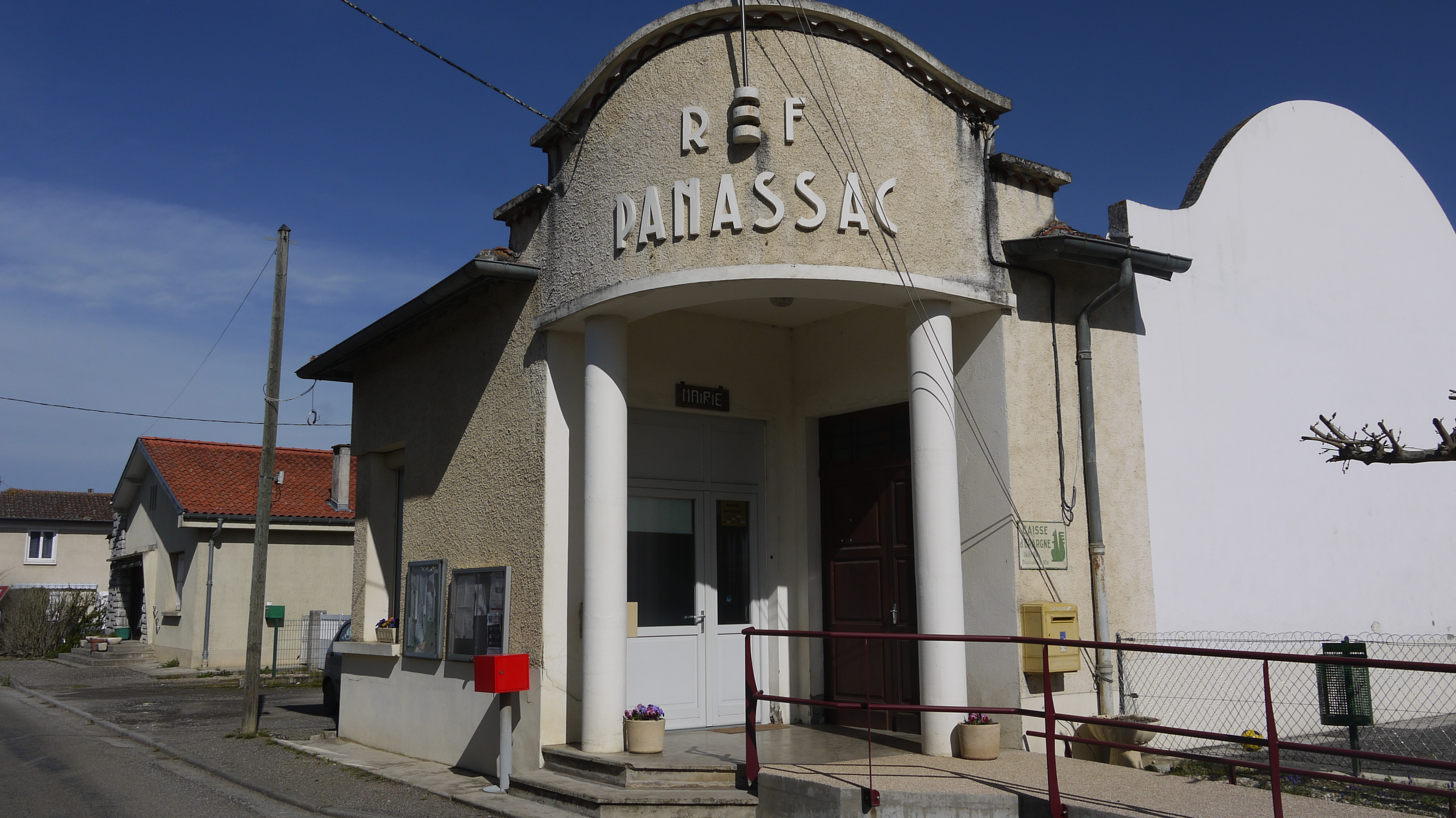
- The town hall in Panassac
- Location of Panassac
- Location within France Location within Occitanie
- Coordinates: 43°23′10″N 0°33′57″E
- Country: France
- Region: Occitania
- Department: Gers
- Arrondissement: Mirande
- Canton: Astarac-Gimone
- Intercommunality: Val de Gers

Government
  - Mayor (2020–2026): Isabelle Exilard
- Area^{1}: 9.17 km^{2} (3.54 sq mi)
- Elevation: 256 m (840 ft)
- Highest elevation: 317 m (1,040 ft)
- Lowest elevation: 209 m (686 ft)
- Population (2023): 278
  - Density: 30.3/km^{2} (78.5/sq mi)
- Time zone: UTC+01:00 (CET)
  - Summer (DST): UTC+02:00 (CEST)
- INSEE/Postal code: 32304 /32140
- ^{1} French Land Register data, which excludes lakes, ponds, glaciers > 1 km^{2} (0.386 sq mi or 247 acres) and river estuaries.

Panassac (French pronunciation: [panasak]) is a commune in the Gers department in southwestern France.

== Geography ==
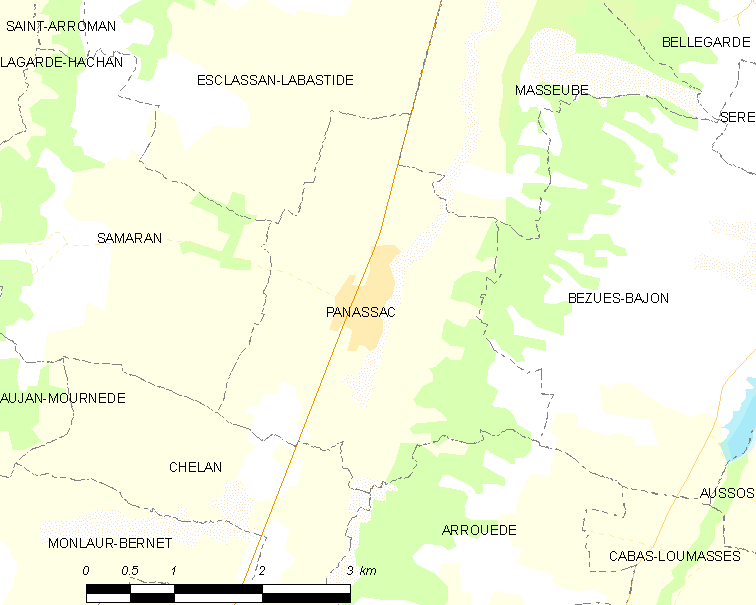
Panassac and its surrounding communes

== Population ==
Historical population
Year	Pop.	±% p.a.
1968	290	—
1975	267	−1.17%
1982	273	+0.32%
1990	262	−0.51%
1999	280	+0.74%
2007	306	+1.12%
2012	278	−1.90%
2017	288	+0.71%
2023	278	−0.59%
Source: INSEE

== See also ==
- Communes of the Gers department
