= Lalanne-Arqué =

- Commune
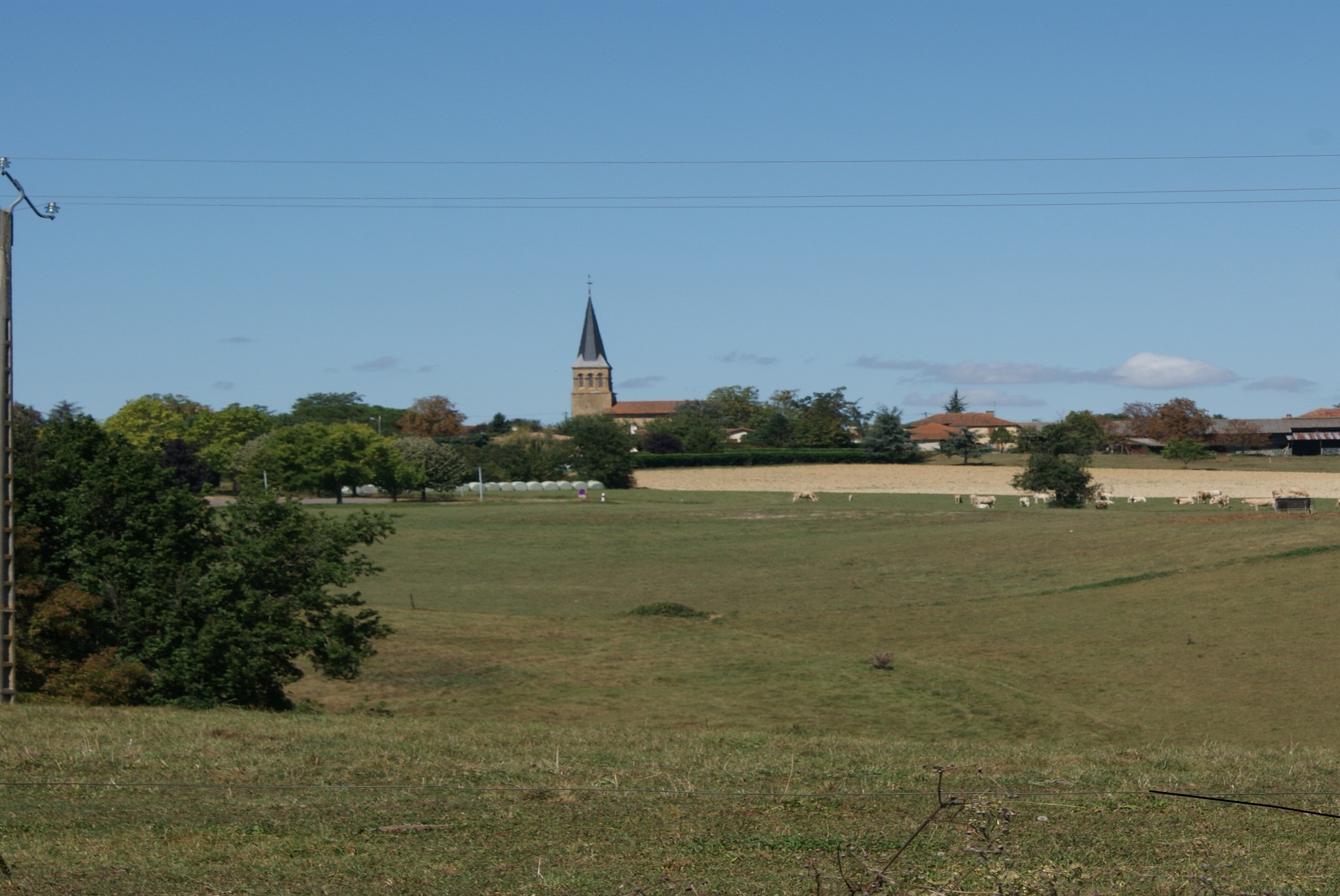
- A general view of Lalanne-Arqué
- Location of Lalanne-Arqué
- Location within France Location within Occitanie
- Coordinates: 43°19′47″N 0°38′35″E
- Country: France
- Region: Occitania
- Department: Gers
- Arrondissement: Mirande
- Canton: Astarac-Gimone

Government
  - Mayor (2020–2026): Thierry Bonnet
- Area^{1}: 11.15 km^{2} (4.31 sq mi)
- Elevation: 340 m (1,120 ft)
- Highest elevation: 367 m (1,204 ft)
- Lowest elevation: 243 m (797 ft)
- Population (2023): 149
  - Density: 13.4/km^{2} (34.6/sq mi)
- Time zone: UTC+01:00 (CET)
  - Summer (DST): UTC+02:00 (CEST)
- INSEE/Postal code: 32185 /32140
- ^{1} French Land Register data, which excludes lakes, ponds, glaciers > 1 km^{2} (0.386 sq mi or 247 acres) and river estuaries.

Lalanne-Arqué (French pronunciation: [lalan aʁke]; Occitan: La Lana Arquèr) is a commune in the Gers department in southwestern France.

== Geography ==
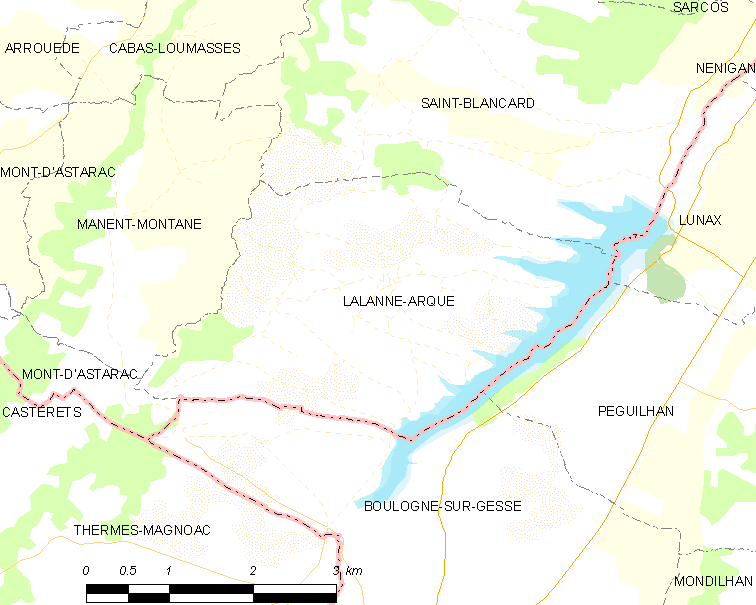
Lalanne-Arqué and its surrounding communes

== Population ==
Historical population
Year	Pop.	±% p.a.
1968	204	—
1975	171	−2.49%
1982	175	+0.33%
1990	167	−0.58%
1999	161	−0.41%
2007	132	−2.45%
2012	145	+1.90%
2017	156	+1.47%
2023	149	−0.76%
Source: INSEE

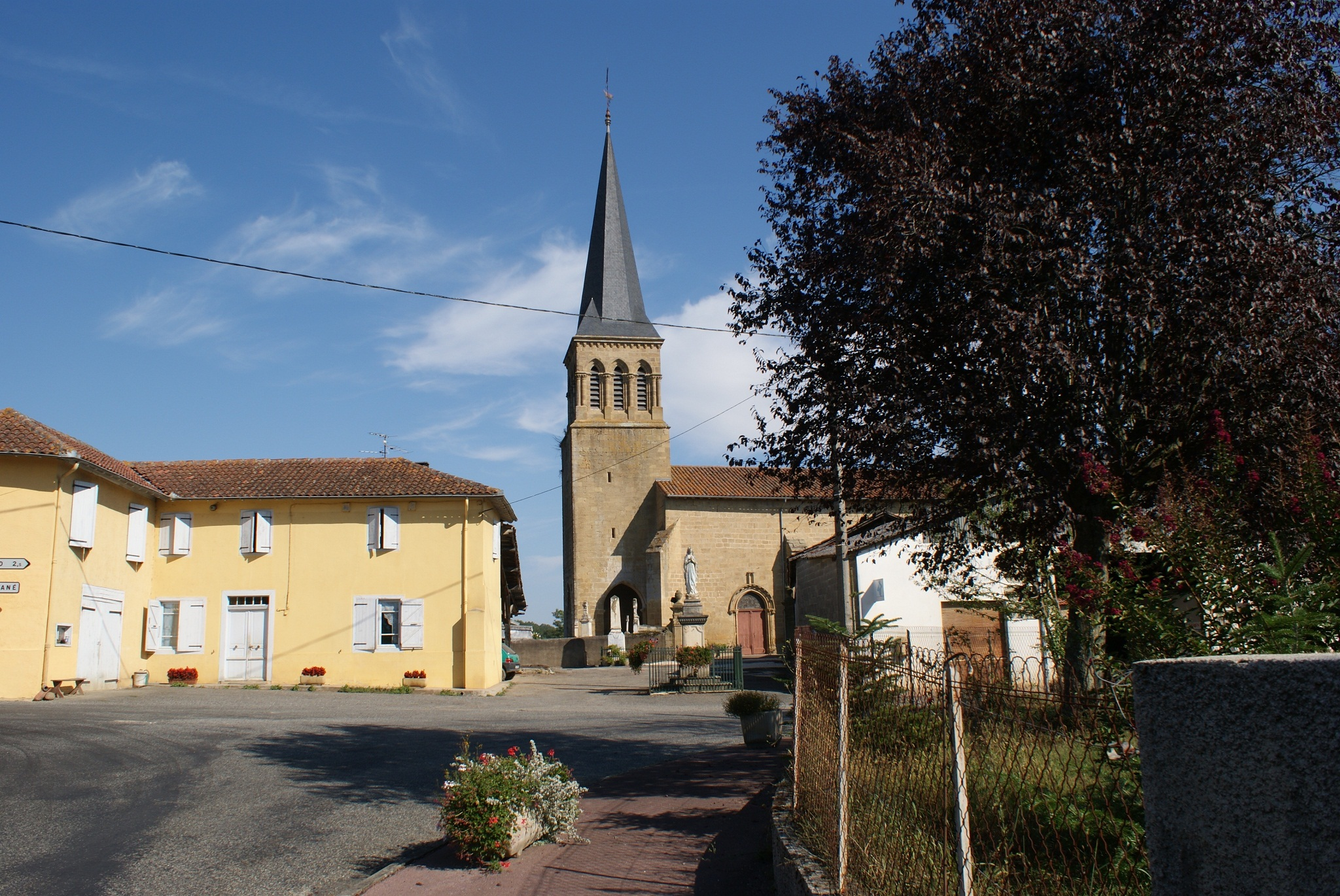
The church

== See also ==
- Communes of the Gers department
