= Sère =

- Commune
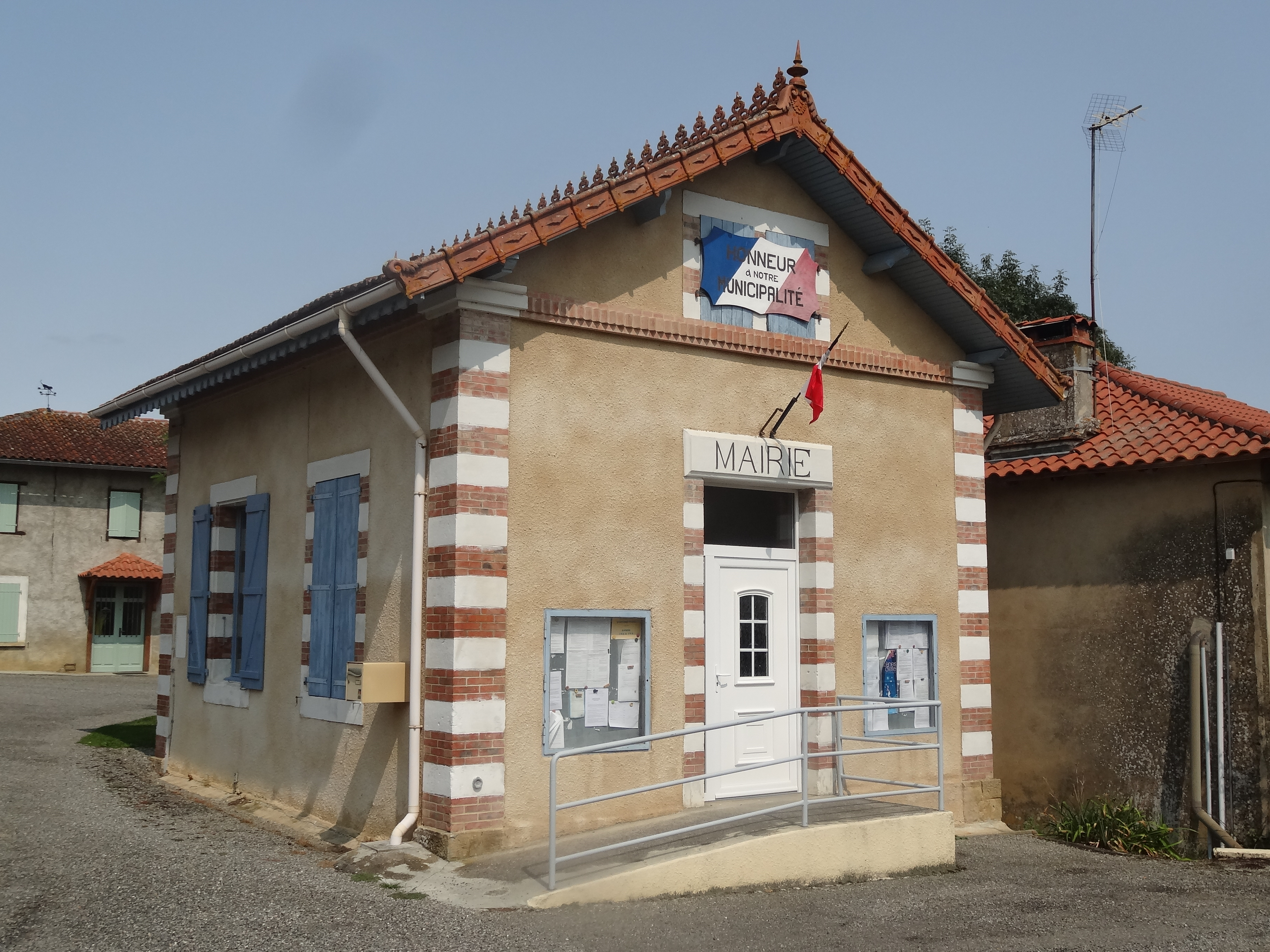
- The town hall in Sère
- Location of Sère
- Location within France Location within Occitanie
- Coordinates: 43°24′46″N 0°38′56″E
- Country: France
- Region: Occitania
- Department: Gers
- Arrondissement: Mirande
- Canton: Astarac-Gimone
- Intercommunality: Val de Gers

Government
  - Mayor (2020–2026): Thierry Malin
- Area^{1}: 8.64 km^{2} (3.34 sq mi)
- Elevation: 318 m (1,043 ft)
- Highest elevation: 326 m (1,070 ft)
- Lowest elevation: 221 m (725 ft)
- Population (2023): 78
  - Density: 9.0/km^{2} (23/sq mi)
- Time zone: UTC+01:00 (CET)
  - Summer (DST): UTC+02:00 (CEST)
- INSEE/Postal code: 32430 /32140
- ^{1} French Land Register data, which excludes lakes, ponds, glaciers > 1 km^{2} (0.386 sq mi or 247 acres) and river estuaries.

Sère (French pronunciation: [sɛʁ]; Occitan: Cèra) is a commune in the Gers department in southwestern France.

== Geography ==
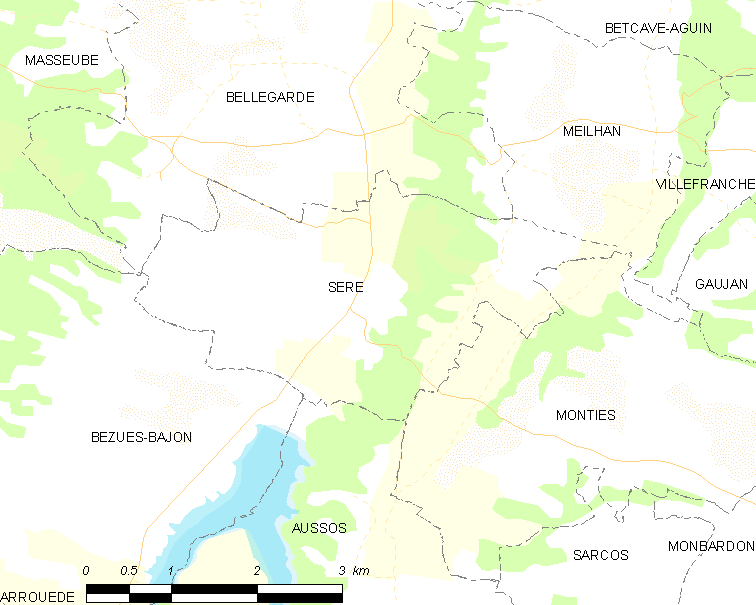
Sère and its surrounding communes

== Population ==
Historical population
Year	Pop.	±% p.a.
1968	137	—
1975	114	−2.59%
1982	119	+0.62%
1990	101	−2.03%
1999	98	−0.33%
2007	92	−0.79%
2012	89	−0.66%
2017	77	−2.86%
2023	78	+0.22%
Source: INSEE

== See also ==
- Communes of the Gers department
