= Tirent-Pontéjac =

- Commune
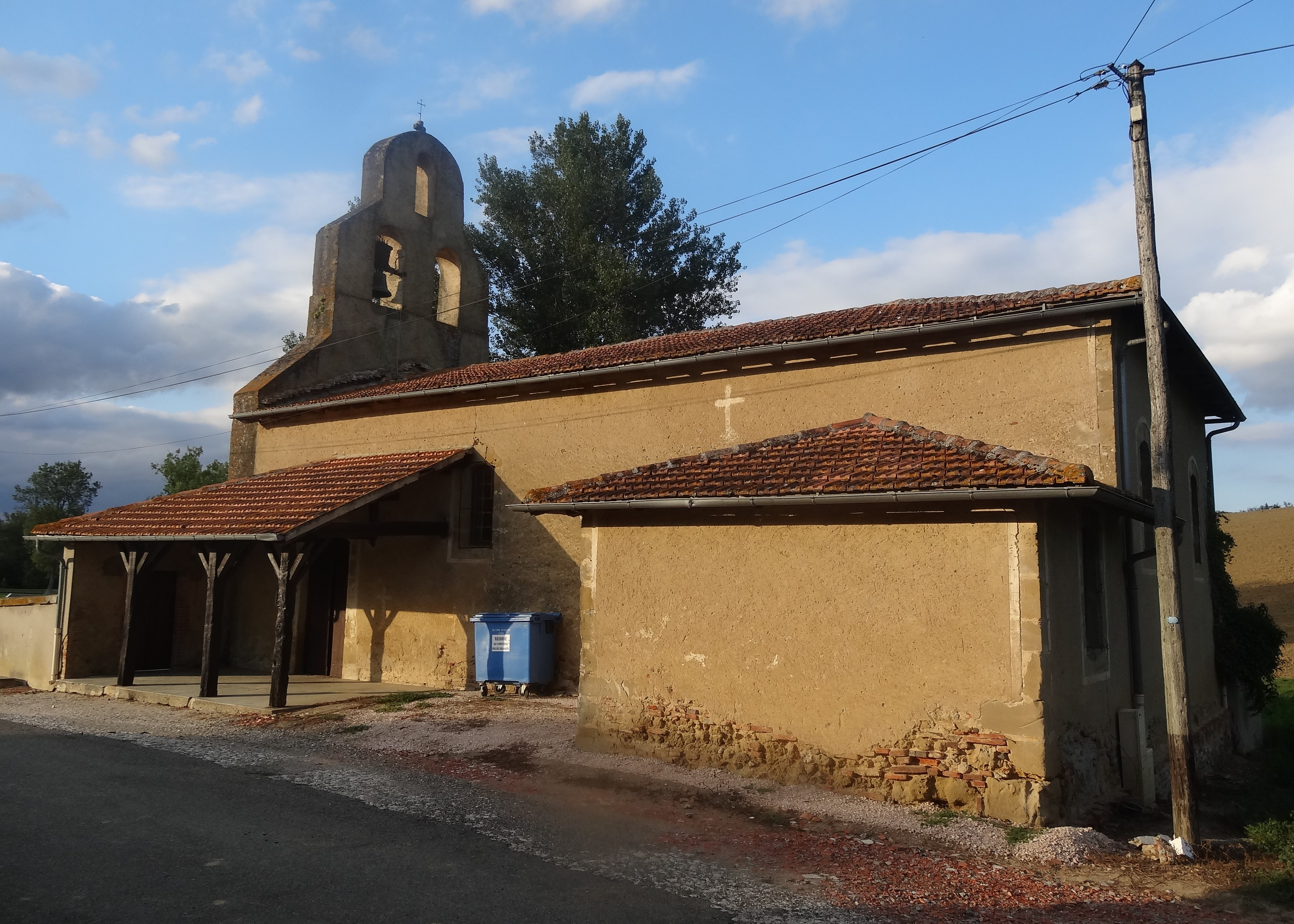
- The church in Tirent-Pontéjac
- Location of Tirent-Pontéjac
- Location within France Location within Occitanie
- Coordinates: 43°33′28″N 0°47′44″E
- Country: France
- Region: Occitania
- Department: Gers
- Arrondissement: Auch
- Canton: Astarac-Gimone

Government
  - Mayor (2020–2026): Fabrice Pourcet
- Area^{1}: 7.55 km^{2} (2.92 sq mi)
- Elevation: 150 m (490 ft)
- Highest elevation: 255 m (837 ft)
- Lowest elevation: 157 m (515 ft)
- Population (2023): 75
  - Density: 9.9/km^{2} (26/sq mi)
- Time zone: UTC+01:00 (CET)
  - Summer (DST): UTC+02:00 (CEST)
- INSEE/Postal code: 32447 /32450
- ^{1} French Land Register data, which excludes lakes, ponds, glaciers > 1 km^{2} (0.386 sq mi or 247 acres) and river estuaries.

Tirent-Pontéjac is a commune in the Gers department in southwestern France.

== Geography ==
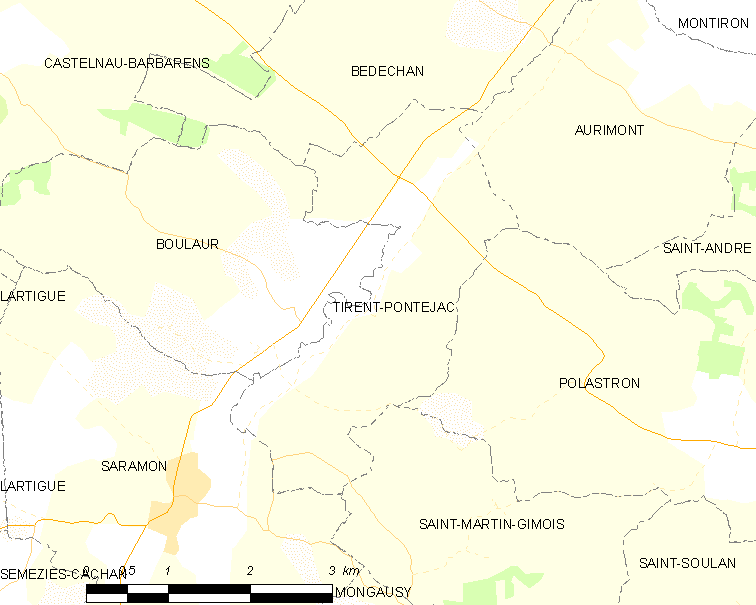
Tirent-Pontéjac and its surrounding communes

== Population ==
Historical population
Year	Pop.	±% p.a.
1968	108	—
1975	104	−0.54%
1982	105	+0.14%
1990	84	−2.75%
1999	70	−2.01%
2007	86	+2.61%
2012	80	−1.44%
2017	89	+2.16%
2023	75	−2.81%
Source: INSEE

== See also ==
- Communes of the Gers department
