= Moncorneil-Grazan =

- Commune
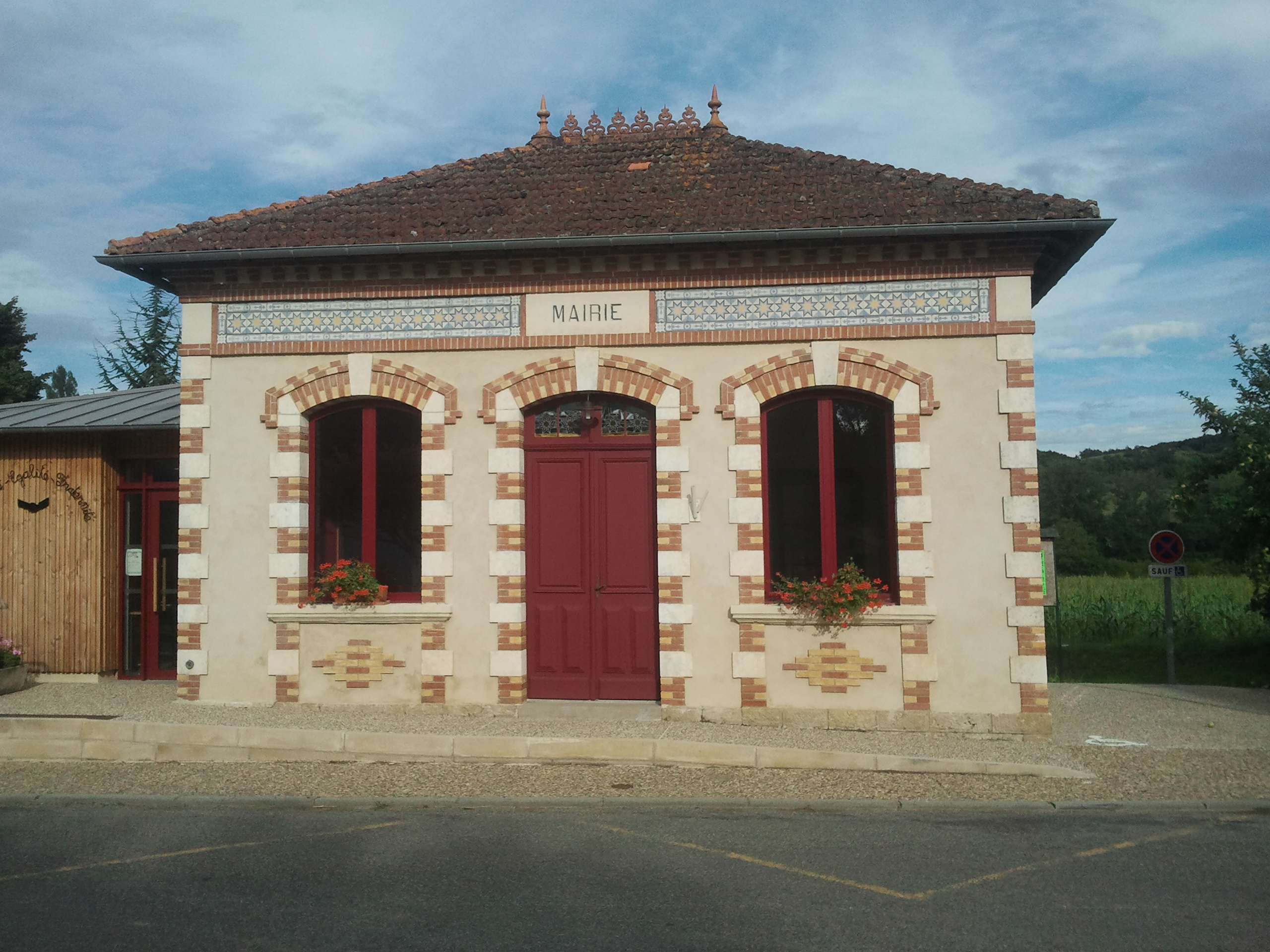
- The town hall in Moncorneil-Grazan
- Location of Moncorneil-Grazan
- Location within France Location within Occitanie
- Coordinates: 43°27′15″N 0°39′16″E
- Country: France
- Region: Occitania
- Department: Gers
- Arrondissement: Mirande
- Canton: Astarac-Gimone
- Intercommunality: Val de Gers

Government
  - Mayor (2020–2026): Serge Marquillie
- Area^{1}: 7.09 km^{2} (2.74 sq mi)
- Elevation: 212 m (696 ft)
- Highest elevation: 314 m (1,030 ft)
- Lowest elevation: 204 m (669 ft)
- Population (2023): 151
  - Density: 21.3/km^{2} (55.2/sq mi)
- Time zone: UTC+01:00 (CET)
  - Summer (DST): UTC+02:00 (CEST)
- INSEE/Postal code: 32266 /32260
- ^{1} French Land Register data, which excludes lakes, ponds, glaciers > 1 km^{2} (0.386 sq mi or 247 acres) and river estuaries.

Moncorneil-Grazan (French pronunciation: [mɔ̃kɔʁnɛj ɡʁazɑ̃]; Occitan: Montcornelh e Grasan) is a commune in the Gers department in southwestern France.

== Geography ==
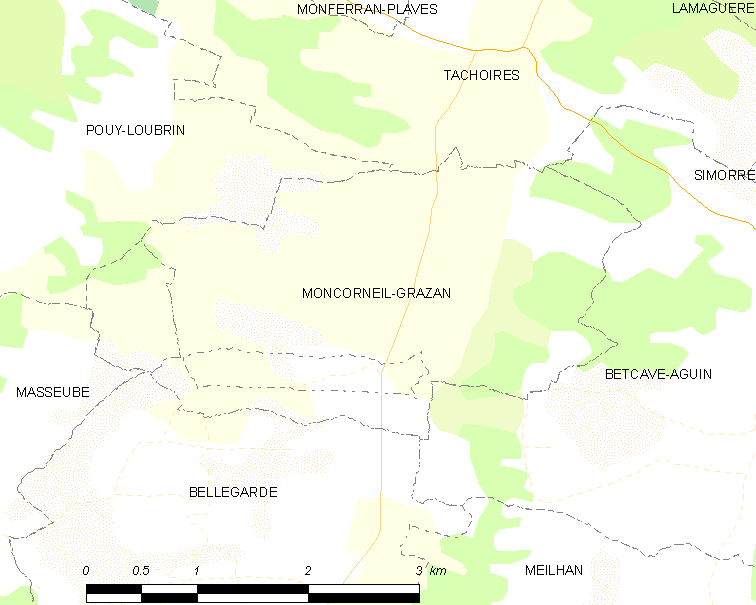
Moncorneil-Grazan and its surrounding communes

== Population ==
Historical population
Year	Pop.	±% p.a.
1968	129	—
1975	101	−3.44%
1982	109	+1.09%
1990	97	−1.45%
1999	104	+0.78%
2007	128	+2.63%
2012	154	+3.77%
2017	153	−0.13%
2023	151	−0.22%
Source: INSEE

== See also ==
- Communes of the Gers department
