= Lamaguère =

- Commune
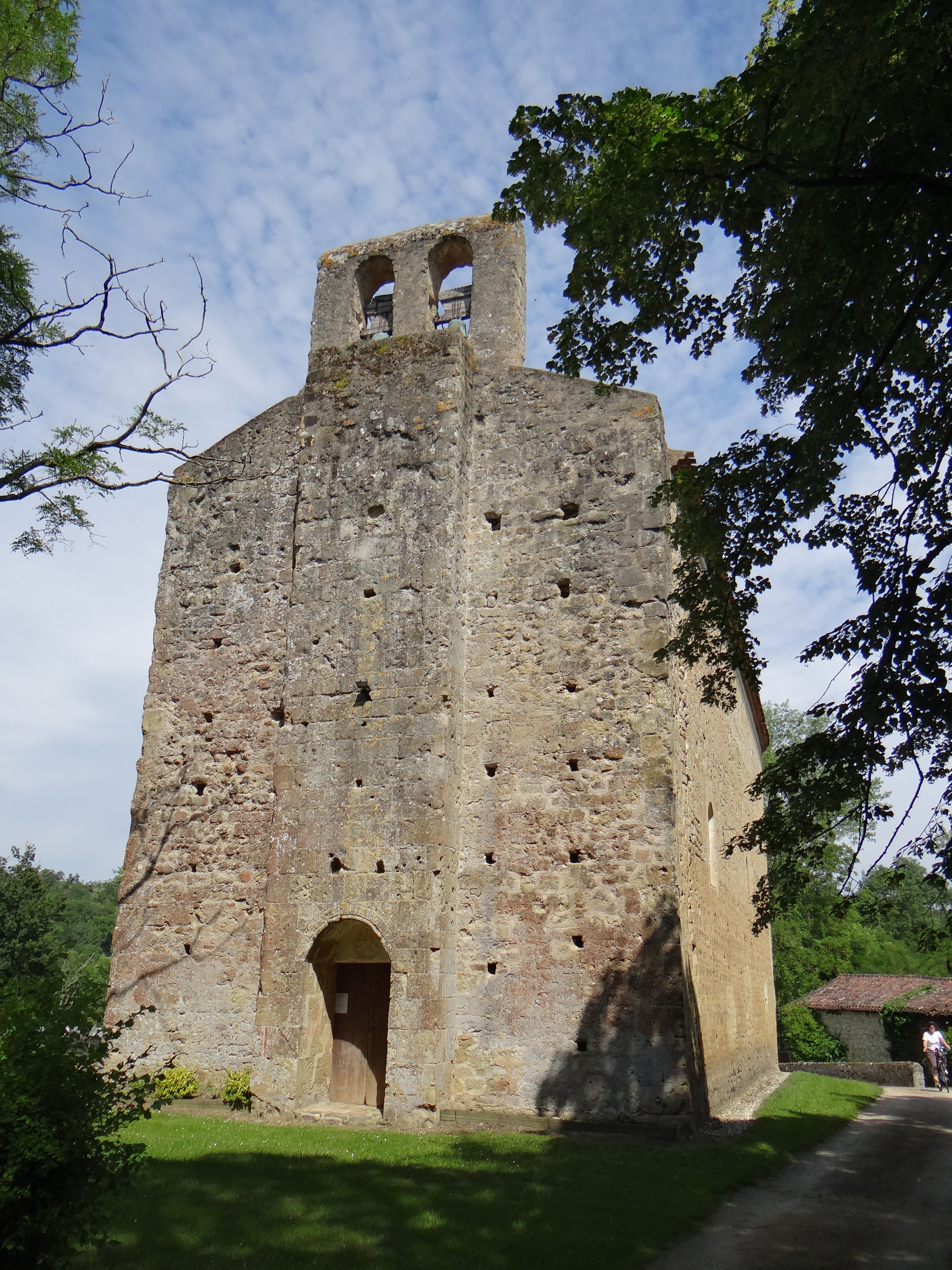
- The church in Lamaguère
- Location of Lamaguère
- Location within France Location within Occitanie
- Coordinates: 43°29′33″N 0°40′23″E
- Country: France
- Region: Occitania
- Department: Gers
- Arrondissement: Mirande
- Canton: Astarac-Gimone

Government
  - Mayor (2020–2026): Jean-Marc Roger
- Area^{1}: 6.49 km^{2} (2.51 sq mi)
- Elevation: 198 m (650 ft)
- Highest elevation: 297 m (974 ft)
- Lowest elevation: 191 m (627 ft)
- Population (2023): 81
  - Density: 12/km^{2} (32/sq mi)
- Time zone: UTC+01:00 (CET)
  - Summer (DST): UTC+02:00 (CEST)
- INSEE/Postal code: 32186 /32260
- ^{1} French Land Register data, which excludes lakes, ponds, glaciers > 1 km^{2} (0.386 sq mi or 247 acres) and river estuaries.

Lamaguère (French pronunciation: [lamaɡɛʁ]; Occitan: La Maguèra) is a commune in the Gers department in southwestern France.

== Geography ==
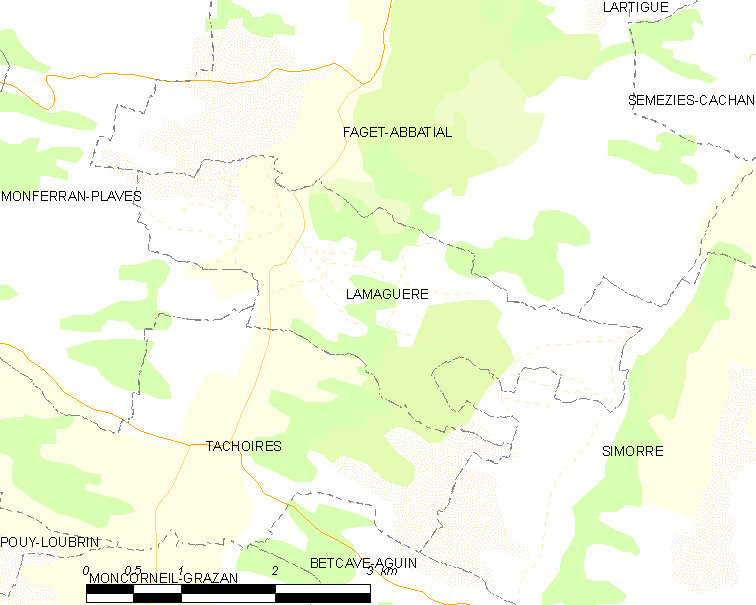
Lamaguère and its surrounding communes

== Population ==
Historical population
Year	Pop.	±% p.a.
1968	96	—
1975	82	−2.23%
1982	92	+1.66%
1990	79	−1.89%
1999	66	−1.98%
2007	64	−0.38%
2012	69	+1.52%
2017	81	+3.26%
2023	81	+0.00%
Source: INSEE

== See also ==
- Communes of the Gers department
