= Monferran-Plavès =

- Commune
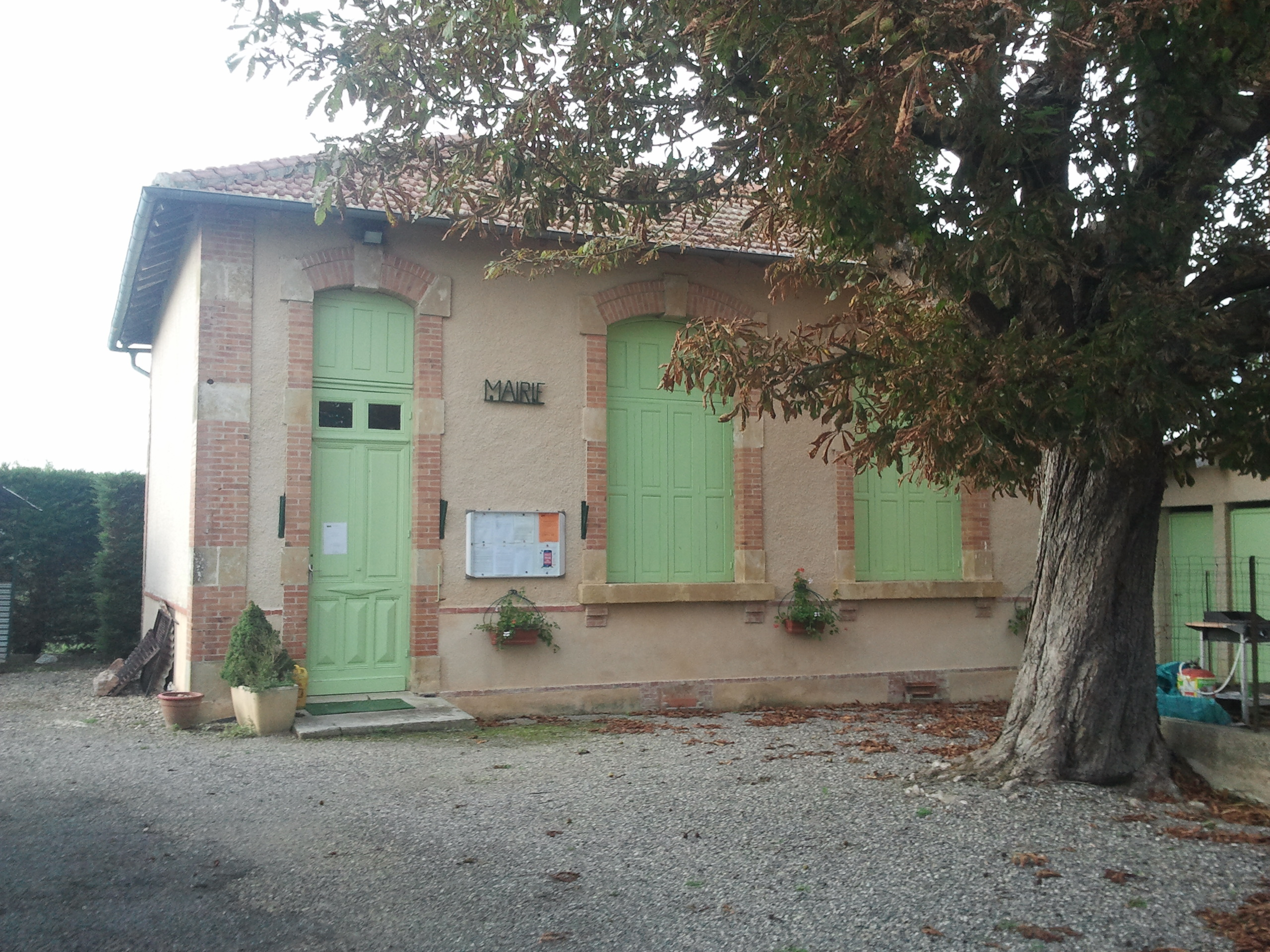
- The town hall in Monferran-Plavès
- Location of Monferran-Plavès
- Location within France Location within Occitanie
- Coordinates: 43°29′35″N 0°38′24″E
- Country: France
- Region: Occitania
- Department: Gers
- Arrondissement: Mirande
- Canton: Astarac-Gimone
- Intercommunality: Val de Gers

Government
  - Mayor (2020–2026): Pierre Michelin
- Area^{1}: 11.07 km^{2} (4.27 sq mi)
- Elevation: 300 m (980 ft)
- Highest elevation: 294 m (965 ft)
- Lowest elevation: 190 m (620 ft)
- Population (2023): 110
  - Density: 9.9/km^{2} (26/sq mi)
- Time zone: UTC+01:00 (CET)
  - Summer (DST): UTC+02:00 (CEST)
- INSEE/Postal code: 32267 /32260
- ^{1} French Land Register data, which excludes lakes, ponds, glaciers > 1 km^{2} (0.386 sq mi or 247 acres) and river estuaries.

Monferran-Plavès (French pronunciation: [mɔ̃fɛ̃ʁɑ̃ plavɛs]; Occitan: Montferrand e Plavés) is a commune in the Gers department in southwestern France.

== Geography ==
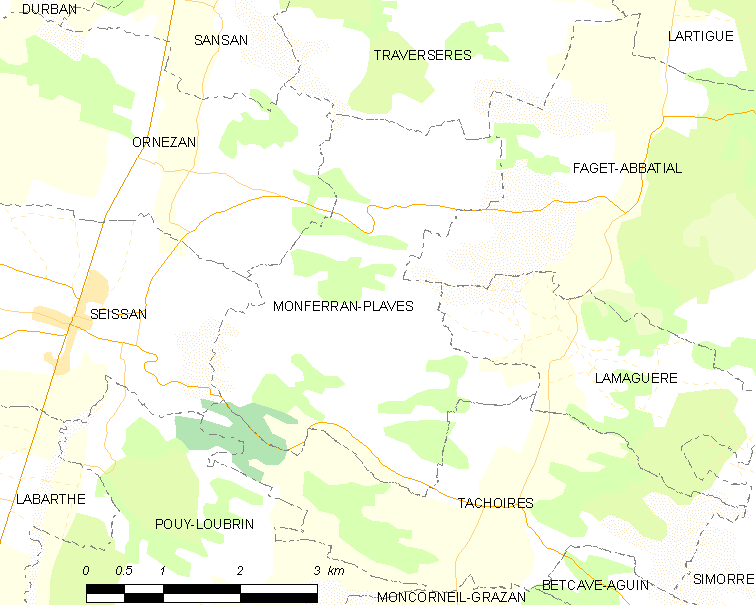
Monferran-Plavès and its surrounding communes

== Population ==
Historical population
Year	Pop.	±% p.a.
1968	131	—
1975	110	−2.47%
1982	111	+0.13%
1990	119	+0.87%
1999	111	−0.77%
2007	128	+1.80%
2012	125	−0.47%
2017	120	−0.81%
2023	110	−1.44%
Source: INSEE

== See also ==
- Communes of the Gers department
