= Saint-Martin-Gimois =

- Commune
- Location of Saint-Martin-Gimois
- Location within France Location within Occitanie
- Coordinates: 43°31′10″N 0°48′26″E
- Country: France
- Region: Occitania
- Department: Gers
- Arrondissement: Auch
- Canton: Astarac-Gimone

Government
  - Mayor (2020–2026): Francis Laguidon
- Area^{1}: 6.68 km^{2} (2.58 sq mi)
- Elevation: 250 m (820 ft)
- Highest elevation: 295 m (968 ft)
- Lowest elevation: 180 m (590 ft)
- Population (2023): 87
  - Density: 13/km^{2} (34/sq mi)
- Time zone: UTC+01:00 (CET)
  - Summer (DST): UTC+02:00 (CEST)
- INSEE/Postal code: 32392 /32450
- ^{1} French Land Register data, which excludes lakes, ponds, glaciers > 1 km^{2} (0.386 sq mi or 247 acres) and river estuaries.

Saint-Martin-Gimois (Gascon: Sent Martin Gimoés) is a commune in the Gers department in southwestern France.

== Geography ==
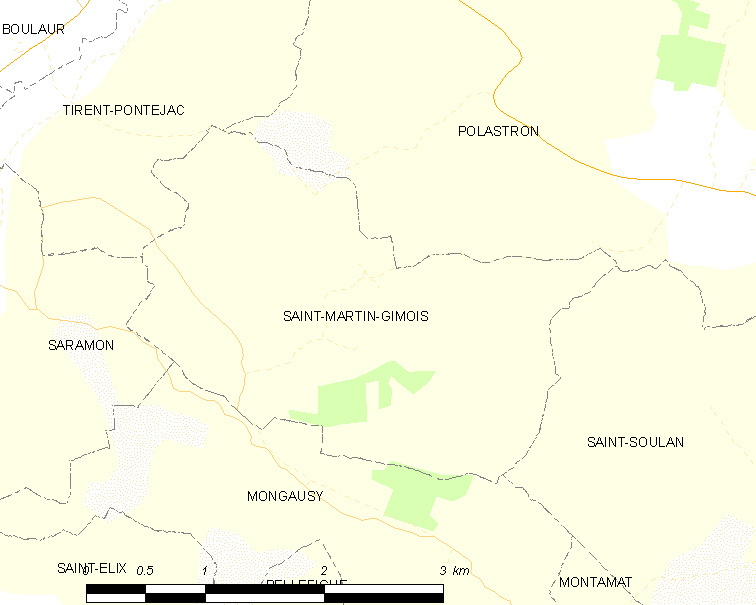
Saint-Martin-Gimois and its surrounding communes

== Population ==
Historical population
Year	Pop.	±% p.a.
1968	95	—
1975	89	−0.93%
1982	86	−0.49%
1990	87	+0.14%
1999	74	−1.78%
2007	76	+0.33%
2012	87	+2.74%
2017	91	+0.90%
2023	87	−0.75%
Source: INSEE

== See also ==
- Communes of the Gers department
