= Traversères =

- Commune
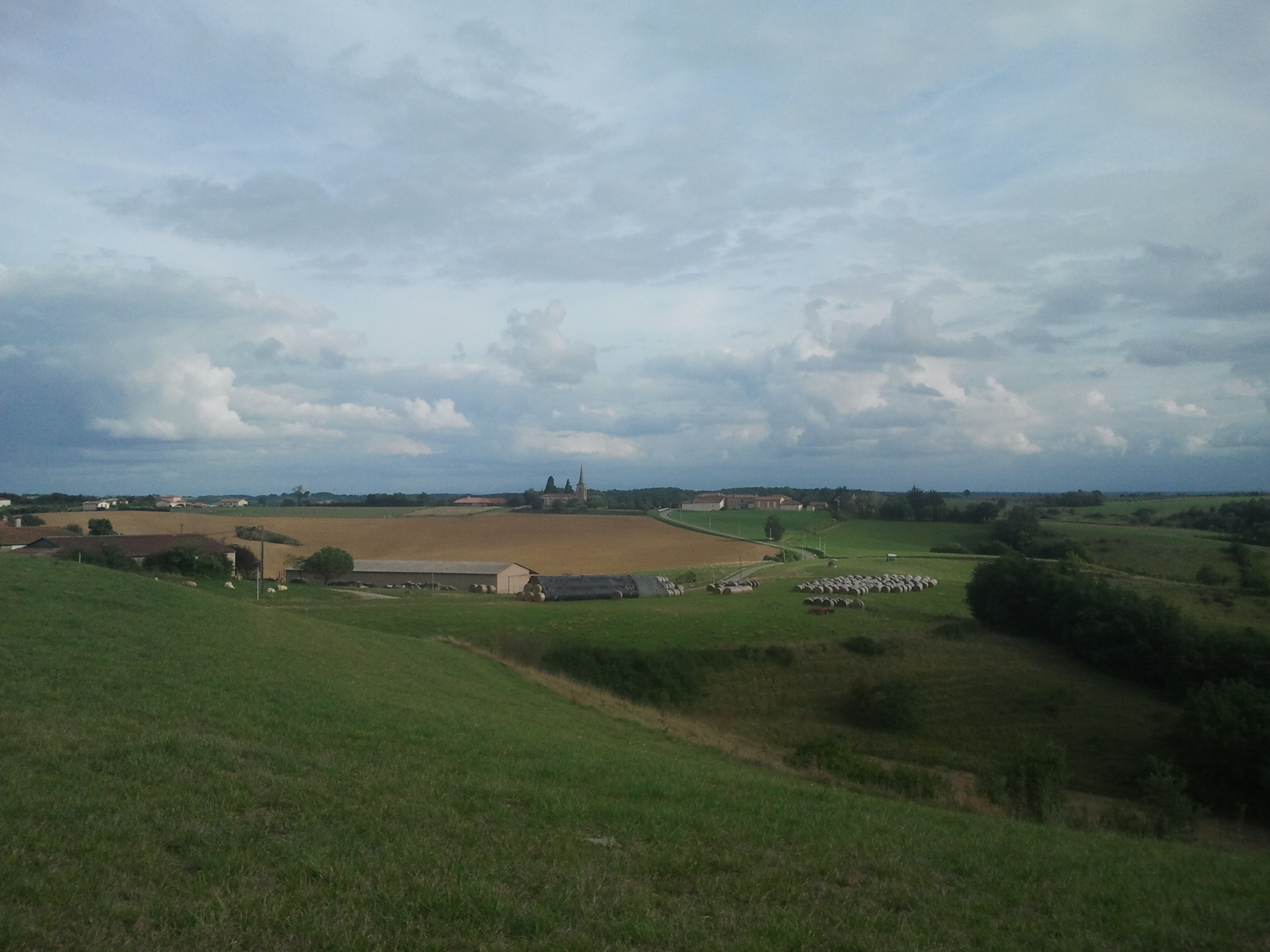
- Traversères
- Location of Traversères
- Location within France Location within Occitanie
- Coordinates: 43°32′12″N 0°39′03″E
- Country: France
- Region: Occitania
- Department: Gers
- Arrondissement: Mirande
- Canton: Astarac-Gimone
- Intercommunality: Val de Gers

Government
  - Mayor (2020–2026): Olivier Barasz
- Area^{1}: 10.46 km^{2} (4.04 sq mi)
- Elevation: 270 m (890 ft)
- Highest elevation: 291 m (955 ft)
- Lowest elevation: 175 m (574 ft)
- Population (2023): 71
  - Density: 6.8/km^{2} (18/sq mi)
- Time zone: UTC+01:00 (CET)
  - Summer (DST): UTC+02:00 (CEST)
- INSEE/Postal code: 32454 /32450
- ^{1} French Land Register data, which excludes lakes, ponds, glaciers > 1 km^{2} (0.386 sq mi or 247 acres) and river estuaries.

Traversères (French pronunciation: [tʁavɛʁsɛʁ]; Occitan: Traversèras) is a commune in the Gers department in southwestern France.

== Geography ==
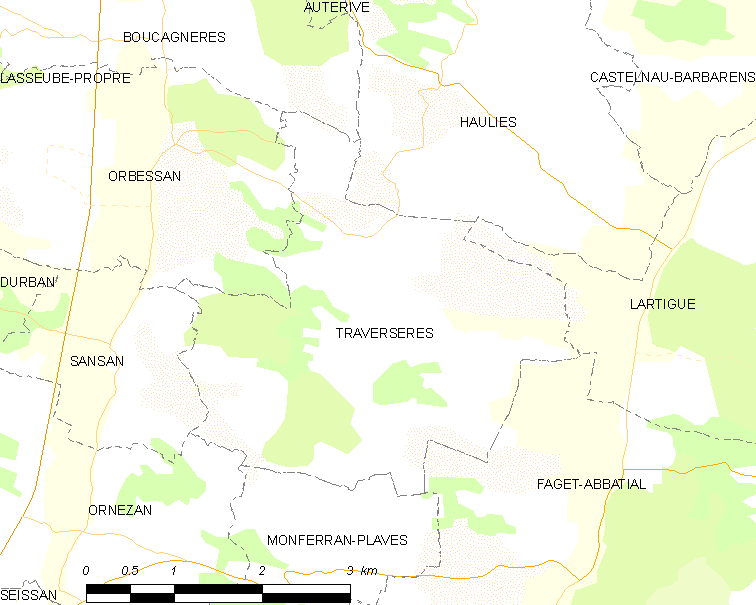
Traversères and its surrounding communes

== Population ==
Historical population
Year	Pop.	±% p.a.
1968	95	—
1975	81	−2.25%
1982	83	+0.35%
1990	66	−2.82%
1999	63	−0.52%
2007	75	+2.20%
2012	79	+1.04%
2017	71	−2.11%
2023	71	+0.00%
Source: INSEE

== See also ==
- Communes of the Gers department
