= Manent-Montané =

- Commune
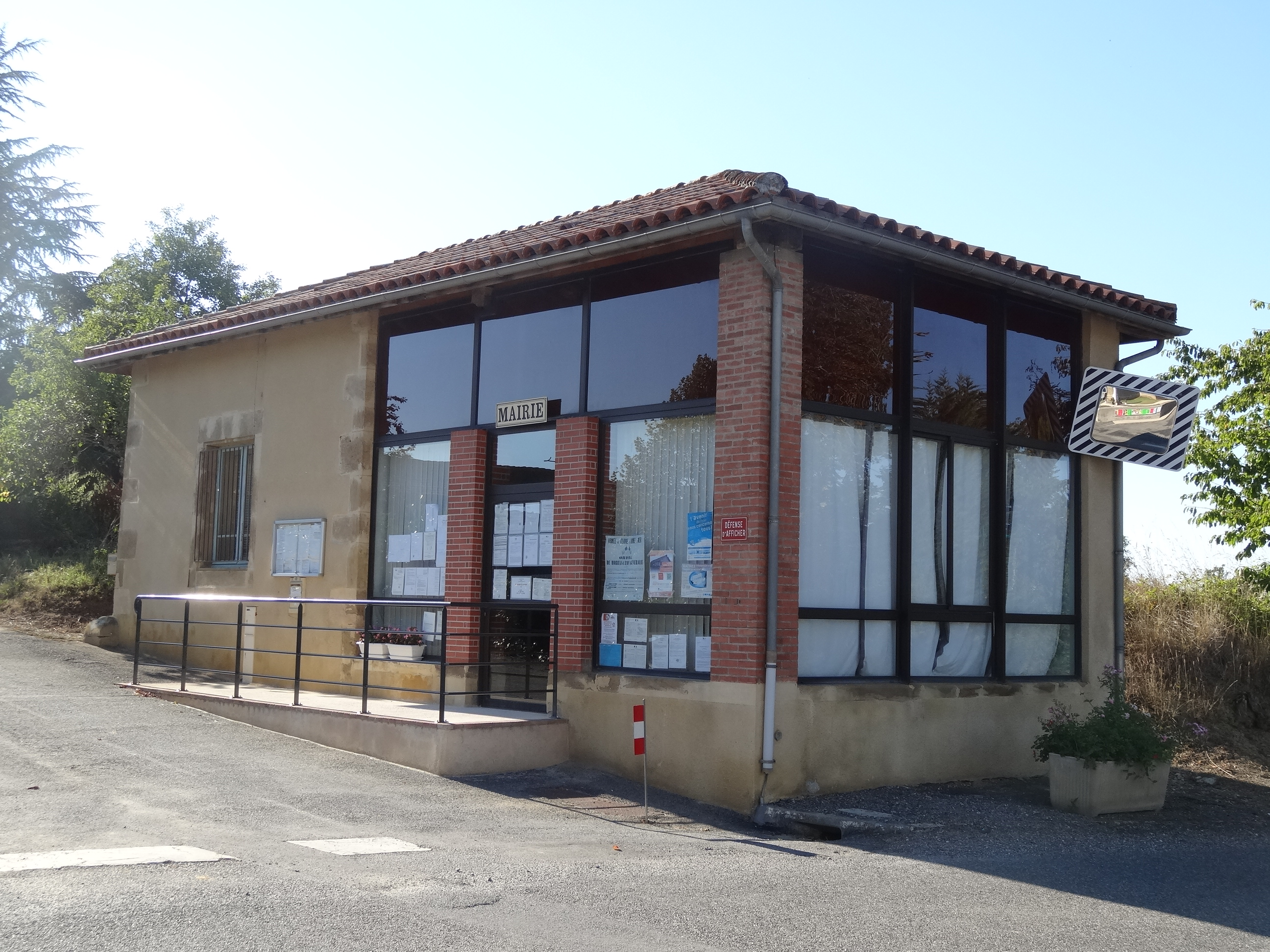
- The town hall in Manent-Montané
- Location of Manent-Montané
- Location within France Location within Occitanie
- Coordinates: 43°20′04″N 0°36′05″E
- Country: France
- Region: Occitania
- Department: Gers
- Arrondissement: Mirande
- Canton: Astarac-Gimone

Government
  - Mayor (2020–2026): Joseph Lafforgue
- Area^{1}: 7.45 km^{2} (2.88 sq mi)
- Elevation: 360 m (1,180 ft)
- Highest elevation: 360 m (1,180 ft)
- Lowest elevation: 257 m (843 ft)
- Population (2023): 85
  - Density: 11/km^{2} (30/sq mi)
- Time zone: UTC+01:00 (CET)
  - Summer (DST): UTC+02:00 (CEST)
- INSEE/Postal code: 32228 /32140
- ^{1} French Land Register data, which excludes lakes, ponds, glaciers > 1 km^{2} (0.386 sq mi or 247 acres) and river estuaries.

Manent-Montané is a commune in the Gers department in southwestern France.

== Geography ==
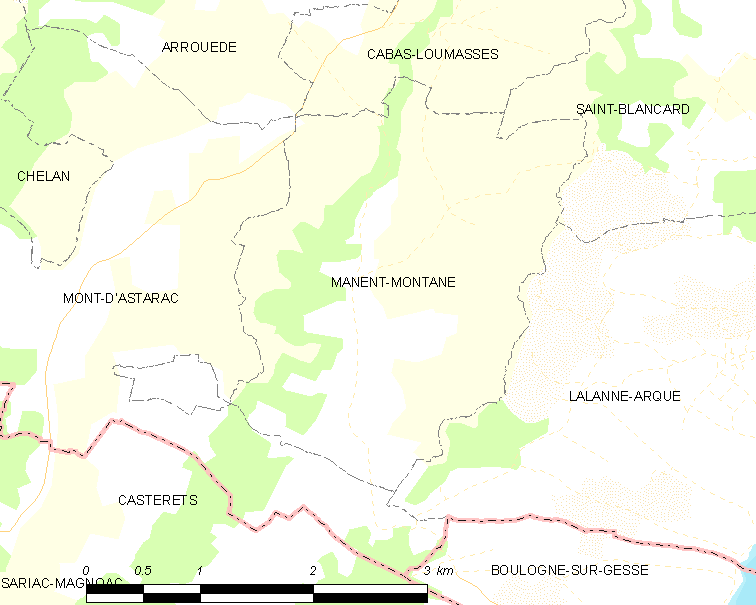
Manent-Montané and its surrounding communes

== Population ==
Historical population
Year	Pop.	±% p.a.
1968	128	—
1975	136	+0.87%
1982	123	−1.43%
1990	103	−2.19%
1999	106	+0.32%
2007	89	−2.16%
2012	92	+0.67%
2017	92	+0.00%
2023	85	−1.31%
Source: INSEE
