= Tachoires =

Administrative division in Occitanie, France

- Commune
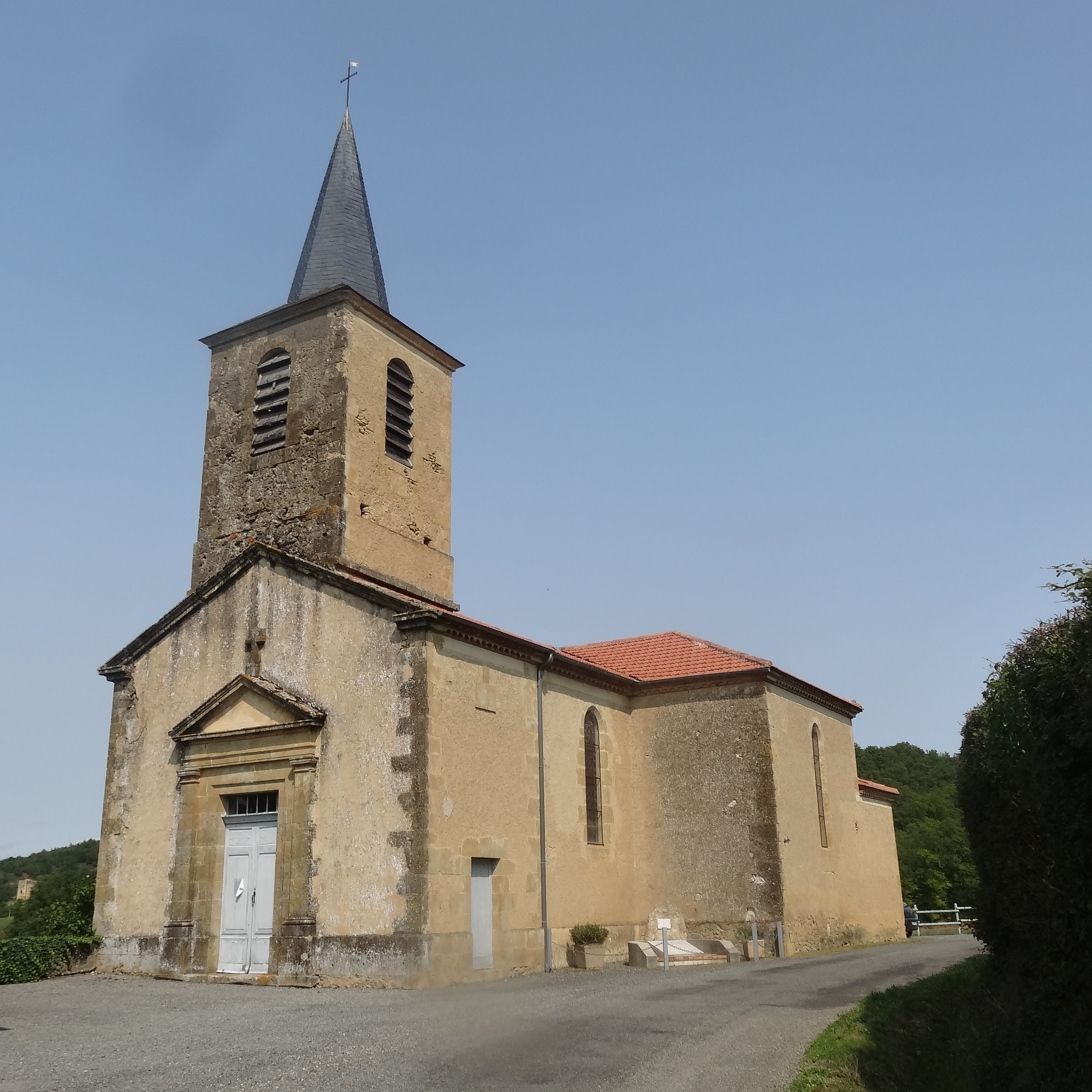
- The church in Tachoires
- Location of Tachoires
- Location within France Location within Occitanie
- Coordinates: 43°28′23″N 0°39′56″E
- Country: France
- Region: Occitania
- Department: Gers
- Arrondissement: Mirande
- Canton: Astarac-Gimone
- Intercommunality: Val de Gers

Government
  - Mayor (2020–2026): Max Balas
- Area^{1}: 9.61 km^{2} (3.71 sq mi)
- Elevation: 210 m (690 ft)
- Highest elevation: 304 m (997 ft)
- Lowest elevation: 197 m (646 ft)
- Population (2023): 115
  - Density: 12.0/km^{2} (31.0/sq mi)
- Time zone: UTC+01:00 (CET)
  - Summer (DST): UTC+02:00 (CEST)
- INSEE/Postal code: 32438 /32260
- ^{1} French Land Register data, which excludes lakes, ponds, glaciers > 1 km^{2} (0.386 sq mi or 247 acres) and river estuaries.

Tachoires (French pronunciation: [taʃwaʁ]; Occitan: Taishoèras) is a commune in the Gers department in southwestern France.

== Geography ==
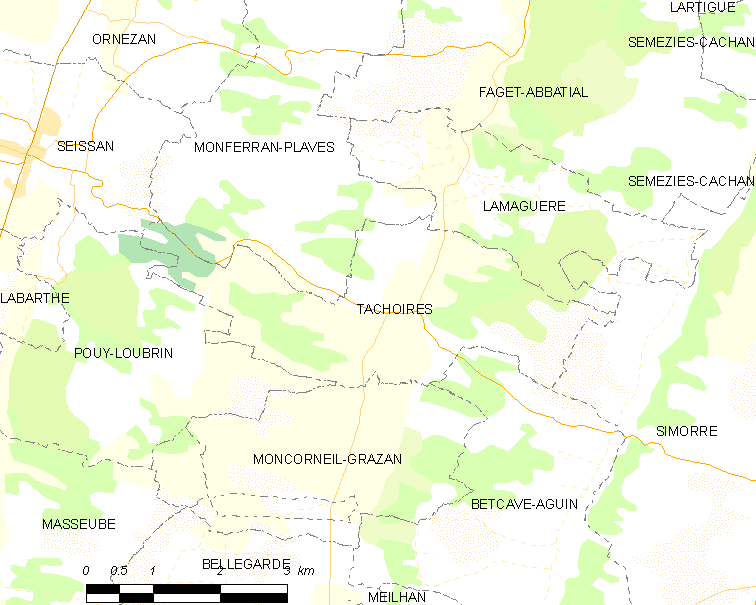
Tachoires and its surrounding communes

== Government and politics ==
=== Mayors ===
Mayor	Term start	Term end
Michel Cazaban	2001	2014
Max Balas	2014	Current

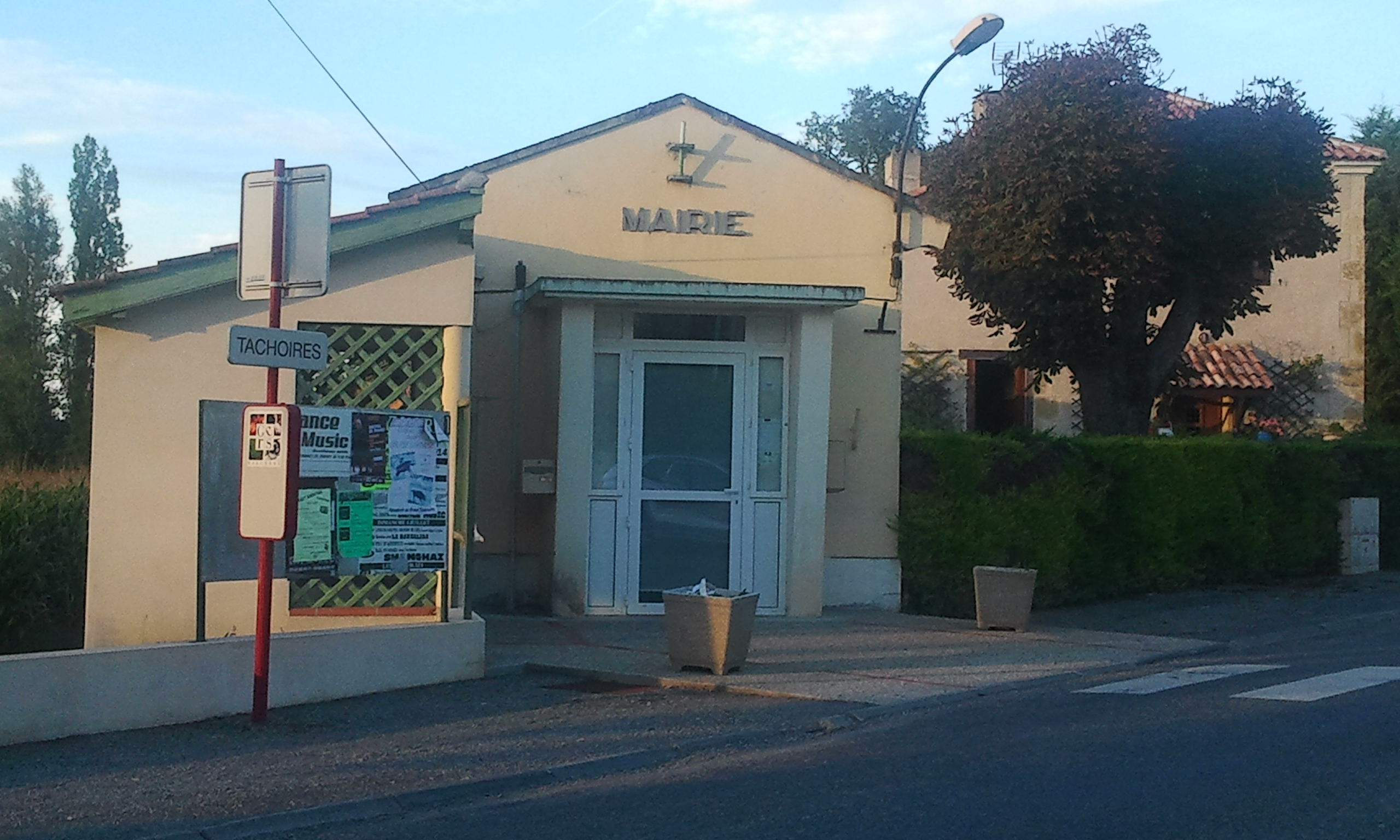
The town hall

== Population ==
Historical population
Year	Pop.	±% p.a.
1968	106	—
1975	98	−1.11%
1982	102	+0.57%
1990	100	−0.25%
1999	101	+0.11%
2007	98	−0.38%
2012	97	−0.20%
2017	98	+0.21%
2023	115	+2.70%
Source: INSEE

== See also ==
- Communes of the Gers department
