= Pouy-Loubrin =

- Commune
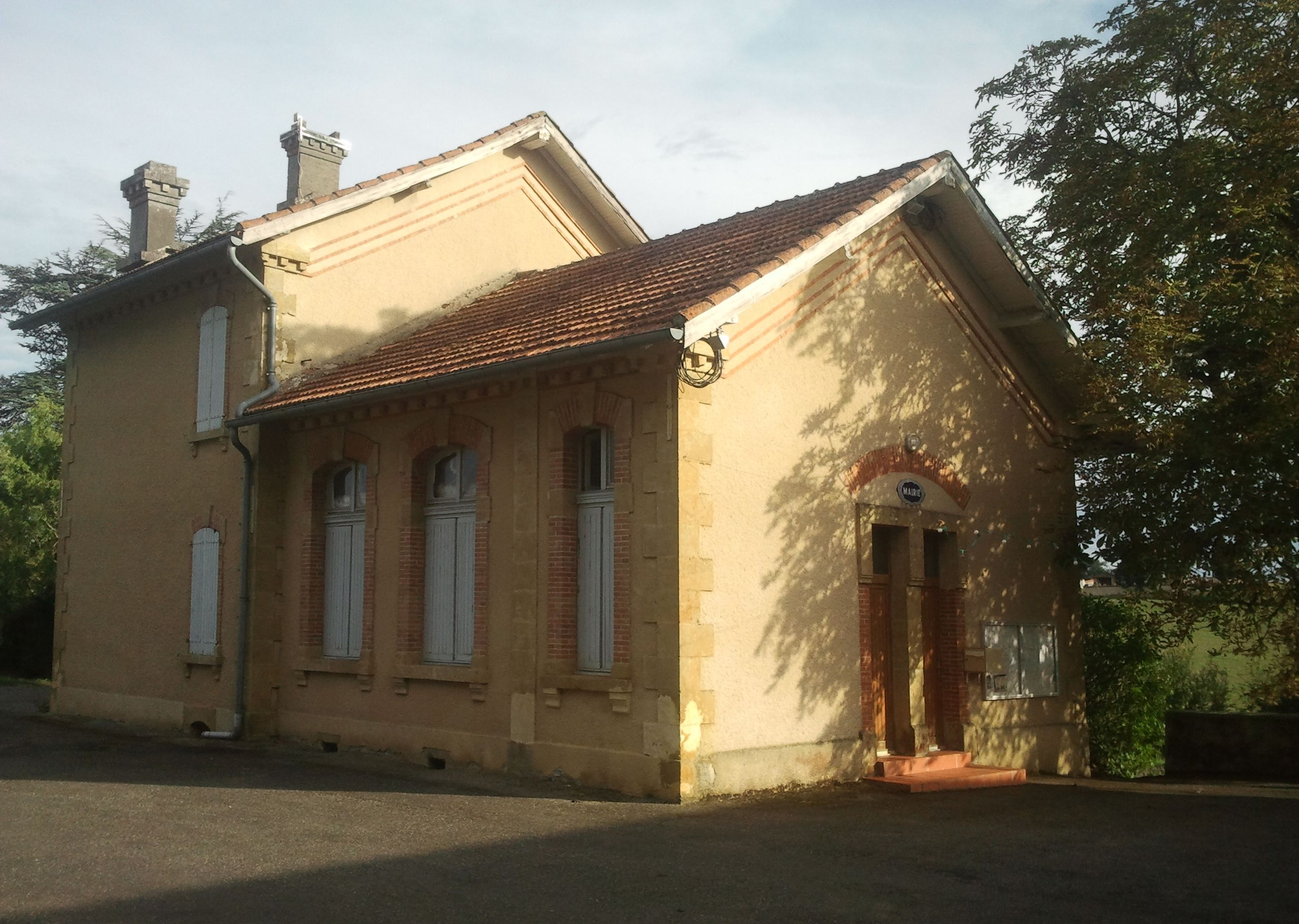
- The town hall in Pouy-Loubrin

- Coat of arms
- Location of Pouy-Loubrin
- Location within France Location within Occitanie
- Coordinates: 43°28′01″N 0°37′08″E
- Country: France
- Region: Occitania
- Department: Gers
- Arrondissement: Mirande
- Canton: Astarac-Gimone
- Intercommunality: Val de Gers

Government
  - Mayor (2020–2026): Philippe Mesnard
- Area^{1}: 9.64 km^{2} (3.72 sq mi)
- Elevation: 271 m (889 ft)
- Highest elevation: 298 m (978 ft)
- Lowest elevation: 180 m (590 ft)
- Population (2023): 85
  - Density: 8.8/km^{2} (23/sq mi)
- Time zone: UTC+01:00 (CET)
  - Summer (DST): UTC+02:00 (CEST)
- INSEE/Postal code: 32327 /32260
- ^{1} French Land Register data, which excludes lakes, ponds, glaciers > 1 km^{2} (0.386 sq mi or 247 acres) and river estuaries.

Pouy-Loubrin (French pronunciation: [pwilubʁɛ̃]; Occitan: Poilobrin) is a commune in the Gers department in southwestern France.

== Geography ==
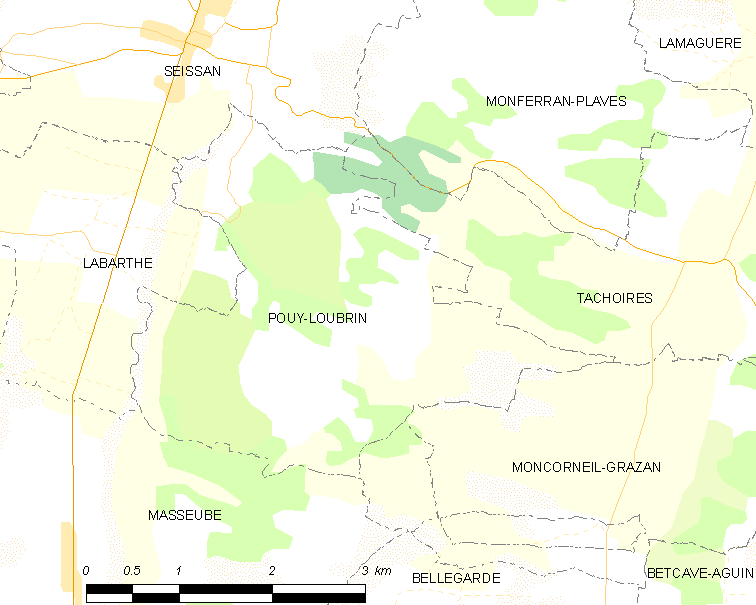
Pouy-Loubrin and its surrounding communes

== Population ==
Historical population
Year	Pop.	±% p.a.
1968	95	—
1975	88	−1.09%
1982	100	+1.84%
1990	103	+0.37%
1999	91	−1.37%
2007	102	+1.44%
2012	107	+0.96%
2017	84	−4.72%
2023	85	+0.20%
Source: INSEE

== See also ==
- Communes of the Gers department
