= Lartigue, Gers =

Lartigue
- Commune
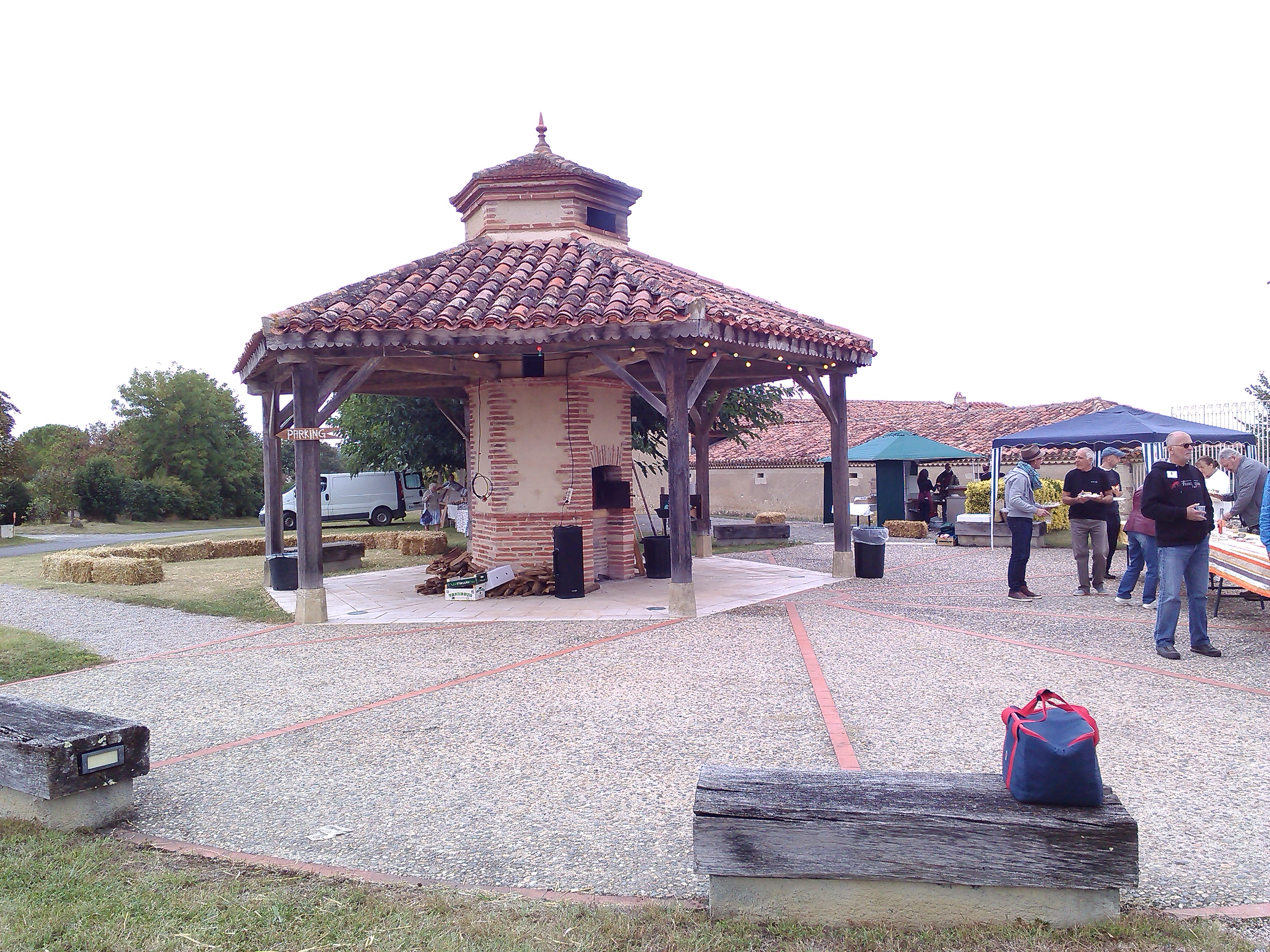
- The communal bread oven in Lartigue

- Coat of arms
- Location of Lartigue
- Location within France Location within Occitanie
- Coordinates: 43°31′53″N 0°43′17″E
- Country: France
- Region: Occitania
- Department: Gers
- Arrondissement: Auch
- Canton: Astarac-Gimone

Government
  - Mayor (2020–2026): Arnaud Wadel
- Area^{1}: 14.89 km^{2} (5.75 sq mi)
- Elevation: 235 m (771 ft)
- Highest elevation: 296 m (971 ft)
- Lowest elevation: 170 m (560 ft)
- Population (2023): 198
  - Density: 13.3/km^{2} (34.4/sq mi)
- Time zone: UTC+01:00 (CET)
  - Summer (DST): UTC+02:00 (CEST)
- INSEE/Postal code: 32198 /32450
- ^{1} French Land Register data, which excludes lakes, ponds, glaciers > 1 km^{2} (0.386 sq mi or 247 acres) and river estuaries.

Lartigue (French pronunciation: [laʁtiɡ]; Occitan: L'Artiga) is a commune in the Gers department in southwestern France.

== Geography ==
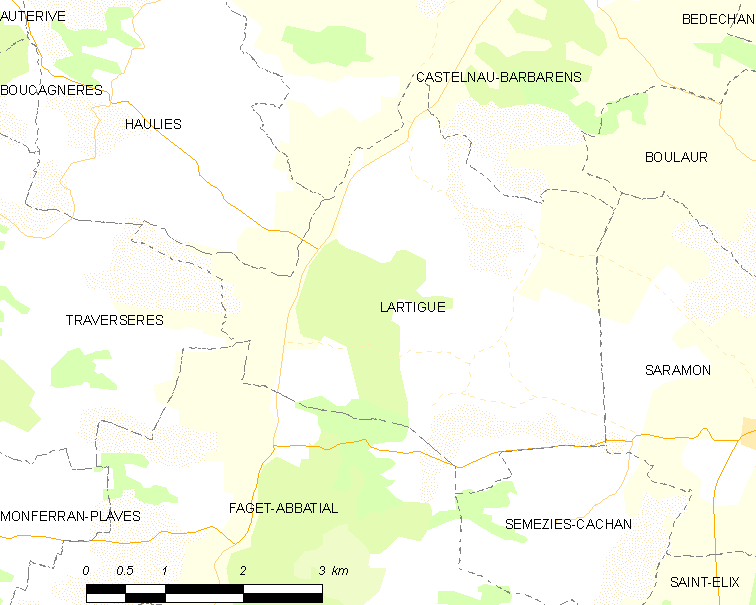
Lartigue and its surrounding communes

== Population ==
Historical population
Year	Pop.	±% p.a.
1968	155	—
1975	130	−2.48%
1982	138	+0.86%
1990	137	−0.09%
1999	164	+2.02%
2007	140	−1.96%
2012	155	+2.06%
2017	183	+3.38%
2023	198	+1.32%
Source: INSEE

== See also ==
- Communes of the Gers department
