= Esclassan-Labastide =

- Commune
- Coat of arms
- Location of Esclassan-Labastide
- Location within France Location within Occitanie
- Coordinates: 43°25′24″N 0°33′32″E
- Country: France
- Region: Occitania
- Department: Gers
- Arrondissement: Mirande
- Canton: Astarac-Gimone
- Intercommunality: Val de Gers

Government
  - Mayor (2021–2026): Martine Baubay
- Area^{1}: 11.93 km^{2} (4.61 sq mi)
- Elevation: 272 m (892 ft)
- Highest elevation: 324 m (1,063 ft)
- Lowest elevation: 204 m (669 ft)
- Population (2023): 335
  - Density: 28.1/km^{2} (72.7/sq mi)
- Time zone: UTC+01:00 (CET)
  - Summer (DST): UTC+02:00 (CEST)
- INSEE/Postal code: 32122 /32140
- ^{1} French Land Register data, which excludes lakes, ponds, glaciers > 1 km^{2} (0.386 sq mi or 247 acres) and river estuaries.

Esclassan-Labastide is a commune in the Gers department in southwestern France.

== Geography ==
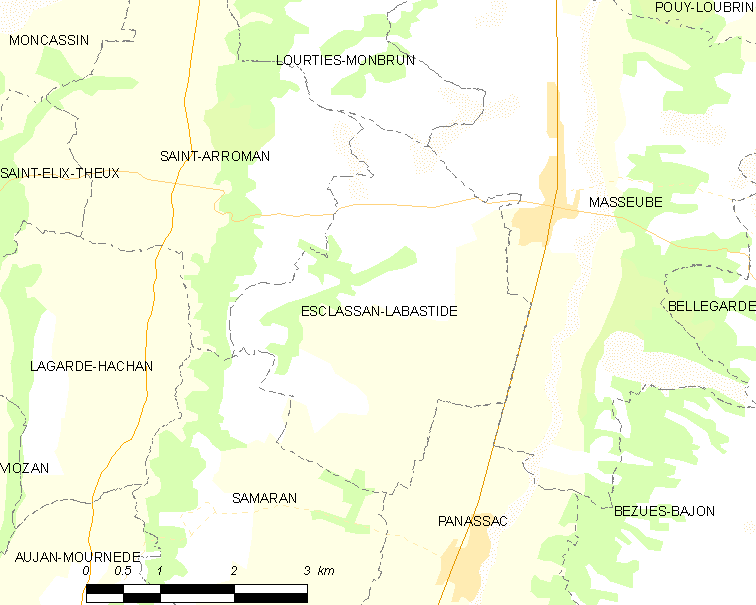
Esclassan-Labastide and its surrounding communes

== Population ==
Historical population
| Year | Pop. | ±% p.a. |
|---|---|---|
| 1968 | 220 | — |
| 1975 | 199 | −1.42% |
| 1982 | 207 | +0.56% |
| 1990 | 211 | +0.24% |
| 1999 | 284 | +3.36% |
| 2007 | 340 | +2.28% |
| 2012 | 360 | +1.15% |
| 2017 | 358 | −0.11% |
| 2023 | 335 | −1.10% |
Source: INSEE

== See also ==
- Communes of the Gers department
