= Canton of Astarac-Gimone =

Administrative division of Gers department, France

Coordinates: 43.43°N 0.58°E

The canton of Astarac-Gimone is an administrative division of the Gers department, southwestern France. It was created at the French canton reorganisation which came into effect in March 2015. Its seat is in Masseube.

It consists of the following communes:

1. Arrouède
2. Aujan-Mournède
3. Aurimont
4. Aussos
5. Bédéchan
6. Bellegarde
7. Bézues-Bajon
8. Boulaur
9. Cap d'Astarac
10. Castelnau-Barbarens
11. Chélan
12. Cuélas
13. Esclassan-Labastide
14. Faget-Abbatial
15. Labarthe
16. Lalanne-Arqué
17. Lamaguère
18. Lartigue
19. Lourties-Monbrun
20. Manent-Montané
21. Masseube
22. Meilhan
23. Moncorneil-Grazan
24. Monferran-Plavès
25. Monlaur-Bernet
26. Mont-d'Astarac
27. Monties
28. Panassac
29. Ponsan-Soubiran
30. Pouy-Loubrin
31. Saint-Arroman
32. Saint-Martin-Gimois
33. Samaran
34. Saramon
35. Seissan
36. Sémézies-Cachan
37. Sère
38. Tachoires
39. Tirent-Pontéjac
40. Traversères
