= Meilhan, Gers =

Meilhan
- Commune
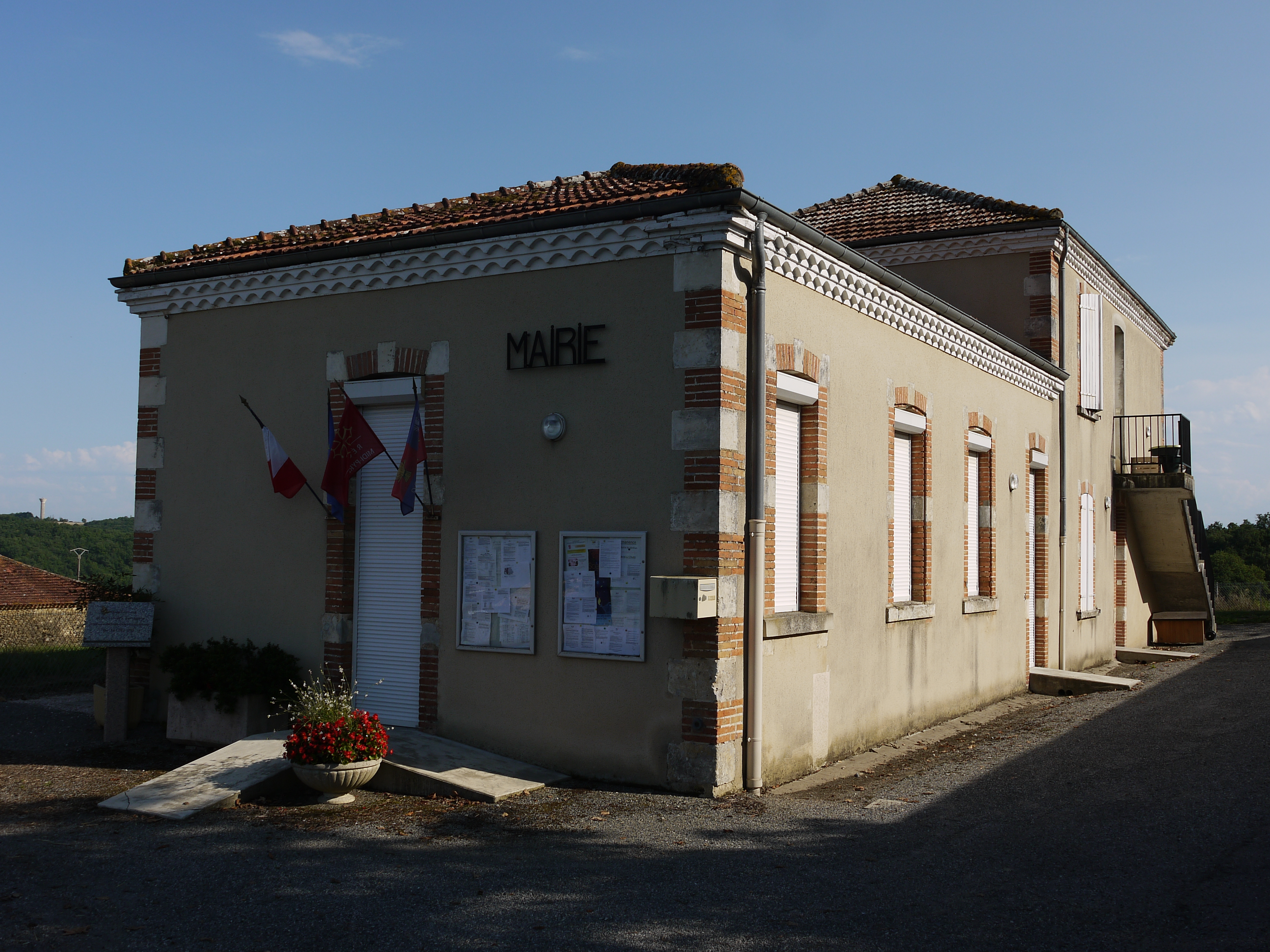
- The town hall in Meilhan
- Location of Meilhan
- Location within France Location within Occitanie
- Coordinates: 43°25′25″N 0°41′03″E
- Country: France
- Region: Occitania
- Department: Gers
- Arrondissement: Mirande
- Canton: Astarac-Gimone
- Intercommunality: Val de Gers

Government
  - Mayor (2020–2026): Anne-Aymone Peyrusse
- Area^{1}: 6.82 km^{2} (2.63 sq mi)
- Elevation: 305 m (1,001 ft)
- Highest elevation: 329 m (1,079 ft)
- Lowest elevation: 215 m (705 ft)
- Population (2023): 75
  - Density: 11/km^{2} (28/sq mi)
- Time zone: UTC+01:00 (CET)
  - Summer (DST): UTC+02:00 (CEST)
- INSEE/Postal code: 32250 /32420
- ^{1} French Land Register data, which excludes lakes, ponds, glaciers > 1 km^{2} (0.386 sq mi or 247 acres) and river estuaries.

Meilhan (French pronunciation: [mɛjɑ̃]; Occitan: Melhan) is a commune in the Gers department in southwestern France.

== Geography ==
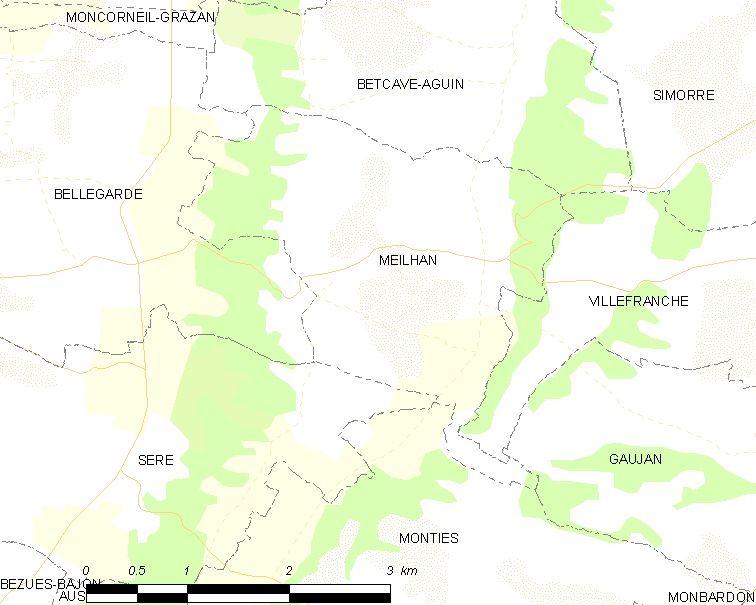
Meilhan and its surrounding communes

== Population ==
Historical population
Year	Pop.	±% p.a.
1968	89	—
1975	83	−0.99%
1982	87	+0.67%
1990	92	+0.70%
1999	80	−1.54%
2007	94	+2.04%
2012	90	−0.87%
2017	80	−2.33%
2023	75	−1.07%
Source: INSEE

== See also ==
- Communes of the Gers department
