= Arrouède =

- Commune
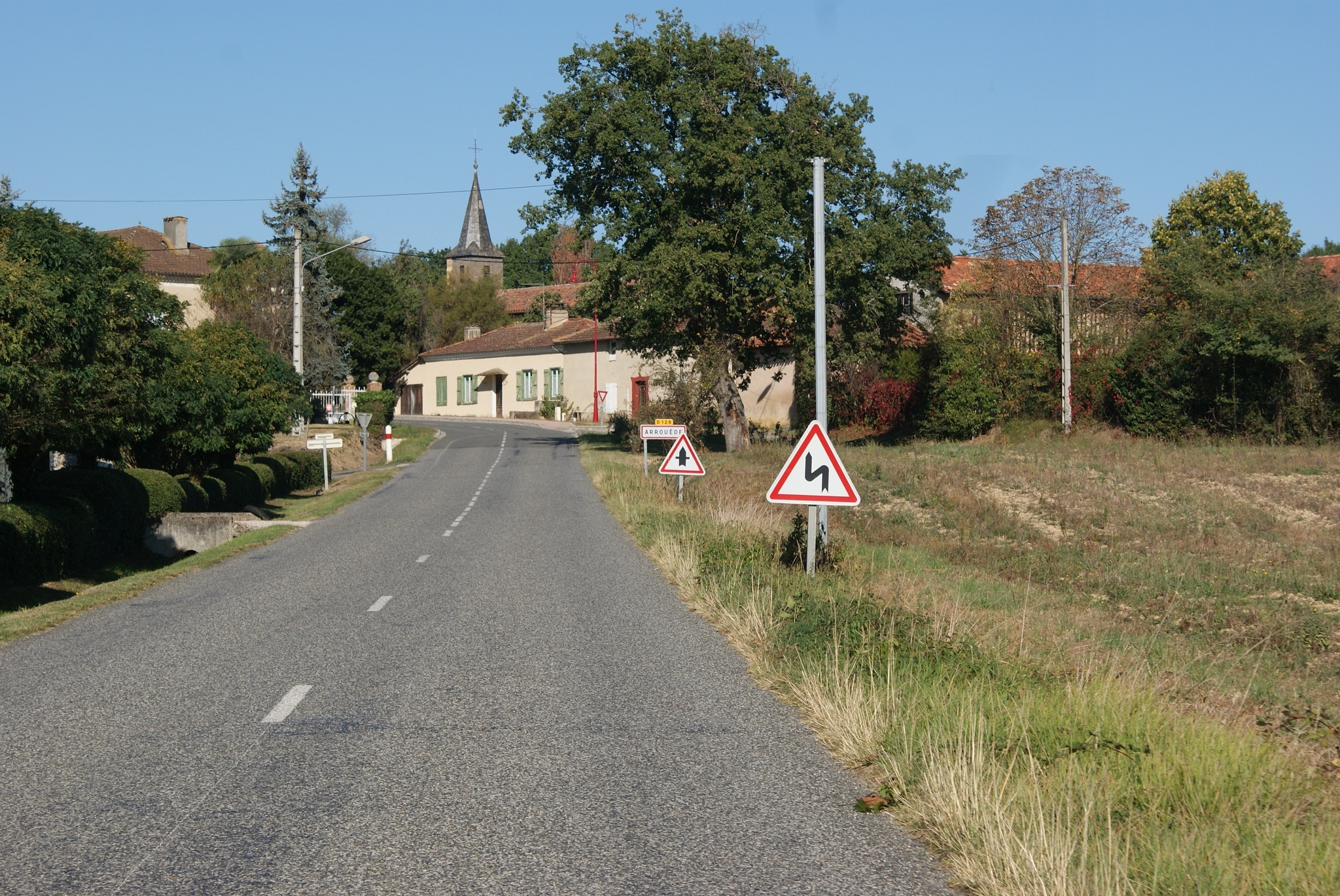
- The main road the D128
- Location of Arrouède
- Location within France Location within Occitanie
- Coordinates: 43°21′38″N 0°35′13″E
- Country: France
- Region: Occitania
- Department: Gers
- Arrondissement: Mirande
- Canton: Astarac-Gimone
- Intercommunality: CC Val Gers

Government
  - Mayor (2020–2026): Christophe Séreuse
- Area^{1}: 6.33 km^{2} (2.44 sq mi)
- Elevation: 321 m (1,053 ft)
- Highest elevation: 327 m (1,073 ft)
- Lowest elevation: 222 m (728 ft)
- Population (2023): 85
  - Density: 13/km^{2} (35/sq mi)
- Time zone: UTC+01:00 (CET)
  - Summer (DST): UTC+02:00 (CEST)
- INSEE/Postal code: 32010 /32140
- ^{1} French Land Register data, which excludes lakes, ponds, glaciers > 1 km^{2} (0.386 sq mi or 247 acres) and river estuaries.

Arrouède (French pronunciation: [aʁwɛd]; Occitan: Arroeda) is a commune in the Gers department in southwestern France.

== Geography ==
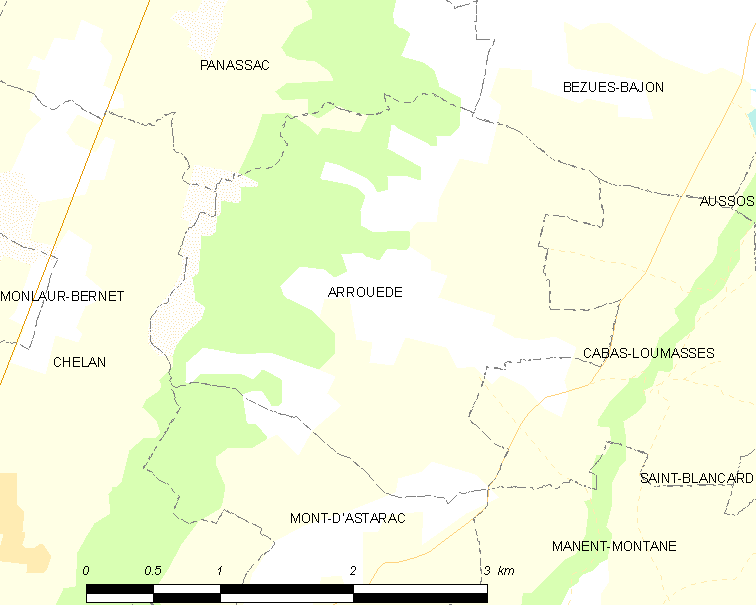
Arrouède and its surrounding communes

== Population ==
Historical population
Year	Pop.	±% p.a.
1968	94	—
1975	81	−2.10%
1982	77	−0.72%
1990	70	−1.18%
1999	78	+1.21%
2007	81	+0.47%
2012	95	+3.24%
2017	110	+2.98%
2023	85	−4.21%
Source: INSEE

== See also ==
- Communes of the Gers department
