= Cuélas =

- Commune
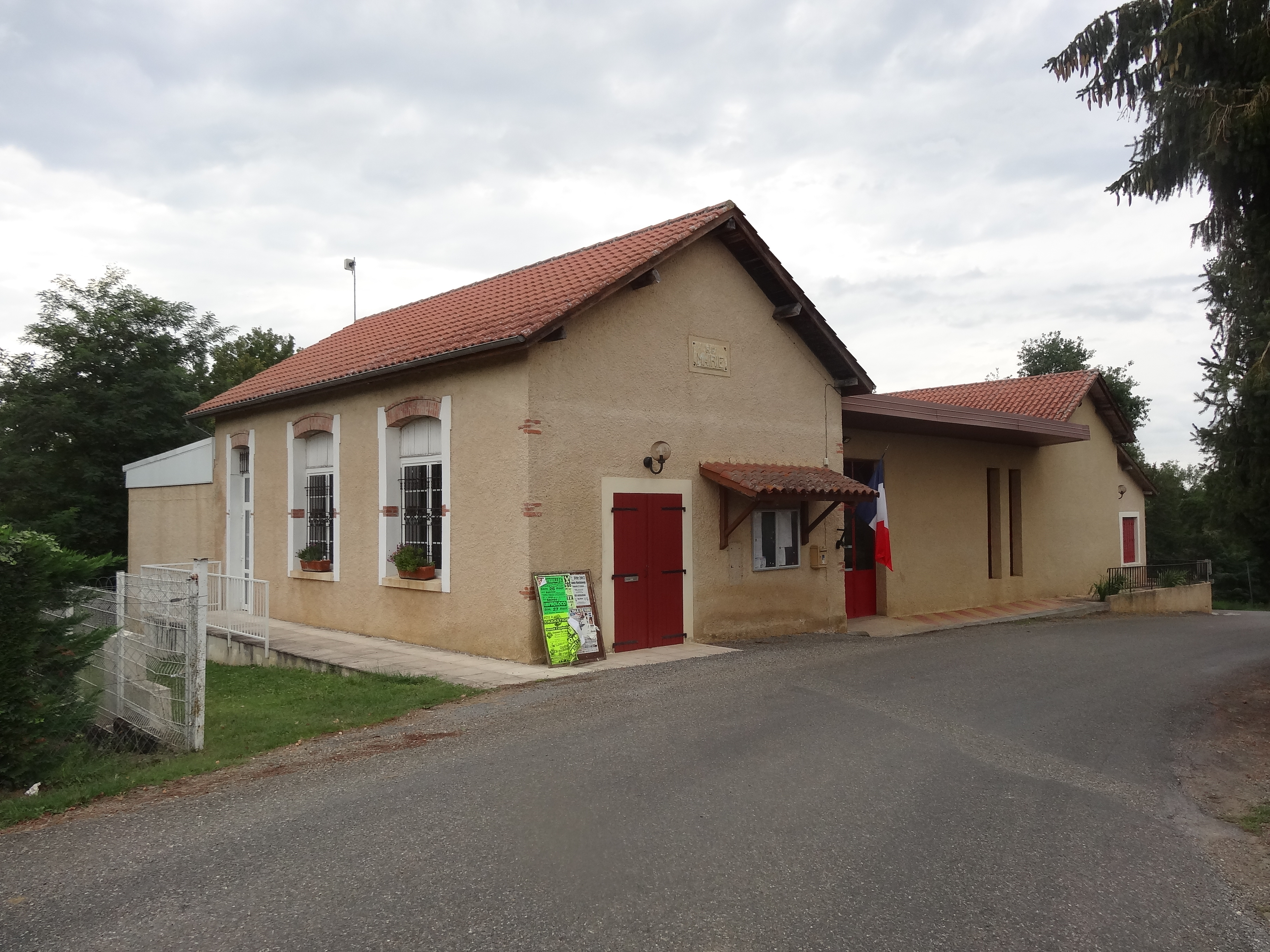
- The town hall in Cuélas
- Location of Cuélas
- Location within France Location within Occitanie
- Coordinates: 43°21′09″N 0°27′16″E
- Country: France
- Region: Occitania
- Department: Gers
- Arrondissement: Mirande
- Canton: Astarac-Gimone

Government
  - Mayor (2020–2026): Christian Duprat
- Area^{1}: 6.55 km^{2} (2.53 sq mi)
- Elevation: 273 m (896 ft)
- Highest elevation: 296 m (971 ft)
- Lowest elevation: 208 m (682 ft)
- Population (2023): 127
  - Density: 19.4/km^{2} (50.2/sq mi)
- Time zone: UTC+01:00 (CET)
  - Summer (DST): UTC+02:00 (CEST)
- INSEE/Postal code: 32114 /32300
- ^{1} French Land Register data, which excludes lakes, ponds, glaciers > 1 km^{2} (0.386 sq mi or 247 acres) and river estuaries.

Cuélas is a commune in the Gers department in southwestern France.

== Geography ==
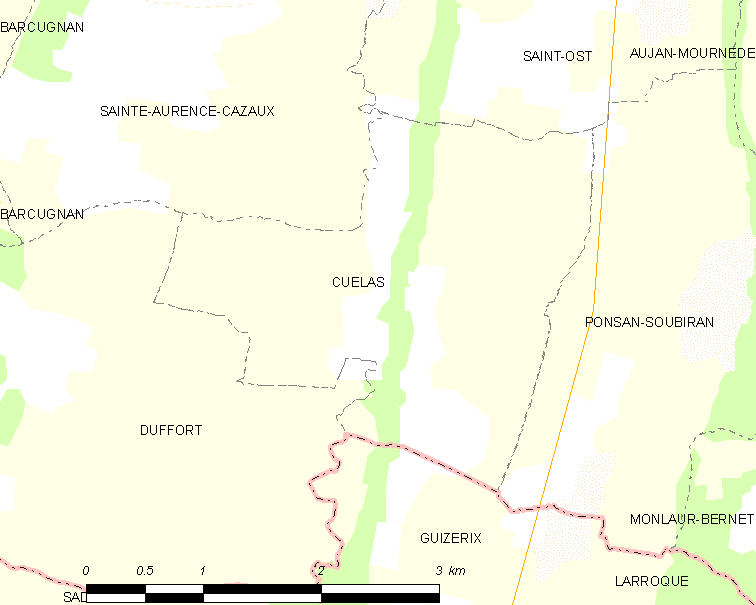
Cuélas and its surrounding communes

== Population ==
Historical population
Year	Pop.	±% p.a.
1968	152	—
1975	137	−1.47%
1982	126	−1.19%
1990	120	−0.61%
1999	106	−1.37%
2007	107	+0.12%
2012	108	+0.19%
2017	124	+2.80%
2023	127	+0.40%
Source: INSEE

== See also ==
- Communes of the Gers department
