= Lourties-Monbrun =

- Commune
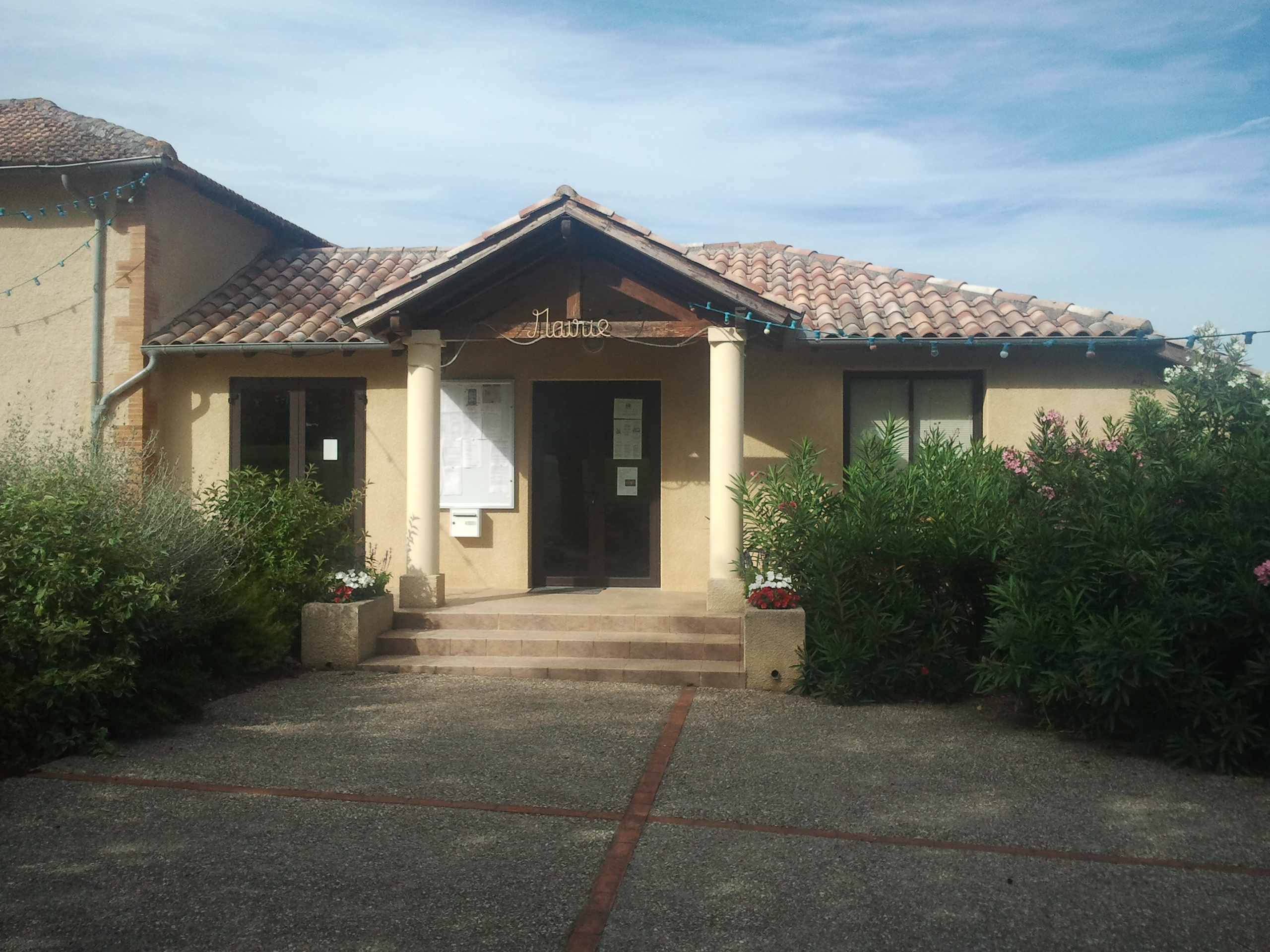
- The town hall in Lourties-Monbrun
- Location of Lourties-Monbrun
- Location within France Location within Occitanie
- Coordinates: 43°27′24″N 0°32′26″E
- Country: France
- Region: Occitania
- Department: Gers
- Arrondissement: Mirande
- Canton: Astarac-Gimone
- Intercommunality: Val de Gers

Government
  - Mayor (2020–2026): Karine Monfort
- Area^{1}: 9.5 km^{2} (3.7 sq mi)
- Elevation: 276 m (906 ft)
- Highest elevation: 301 m (988 ft)
- Lowest elevation: 192 m (630 ft)
- Population (2023): 150
  - Density: 16/km^{2} (41/sq mi)
- Time zone: UTC+01:00 (CET)
  - Summer (DST): UTC+02:00 (CEST)
- INSEE/Postal code: 32216 /32140
- ^{1} French Land Register data, which excludes lakes, ponds, glaciers > 1 km^{2} (0.386 sq mi or 247 acres) and river estuaries.

Lourties-Monbrun (French pronunciation: [luʁti mɔ̃bʁœ̃]; Occitan: Lortias e Montbrun) is a commune in the Gers department in southwestern France.

== Geography ==
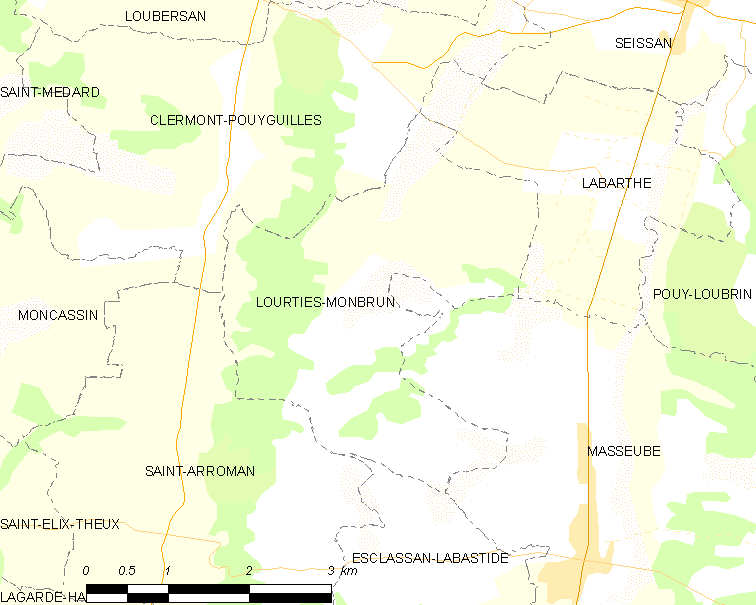
Lourties-Monbrun and its surrounding communes

== Population ==
Historical population
Year	Pop.	±% p.a.
1968	61	—
1975	50	−2.80%
1982	93	+9.27%
1990	102	+1.16%
1999	108	+0.64%
2007	126	+1.95%
2012	140	+2.13%
2017	158	+2.45%
2023	150	−0.86%
Source: INSEE

== See also ==
- Communes of the Gers department
