= Samaran, Gers =

Samaran
- Commune
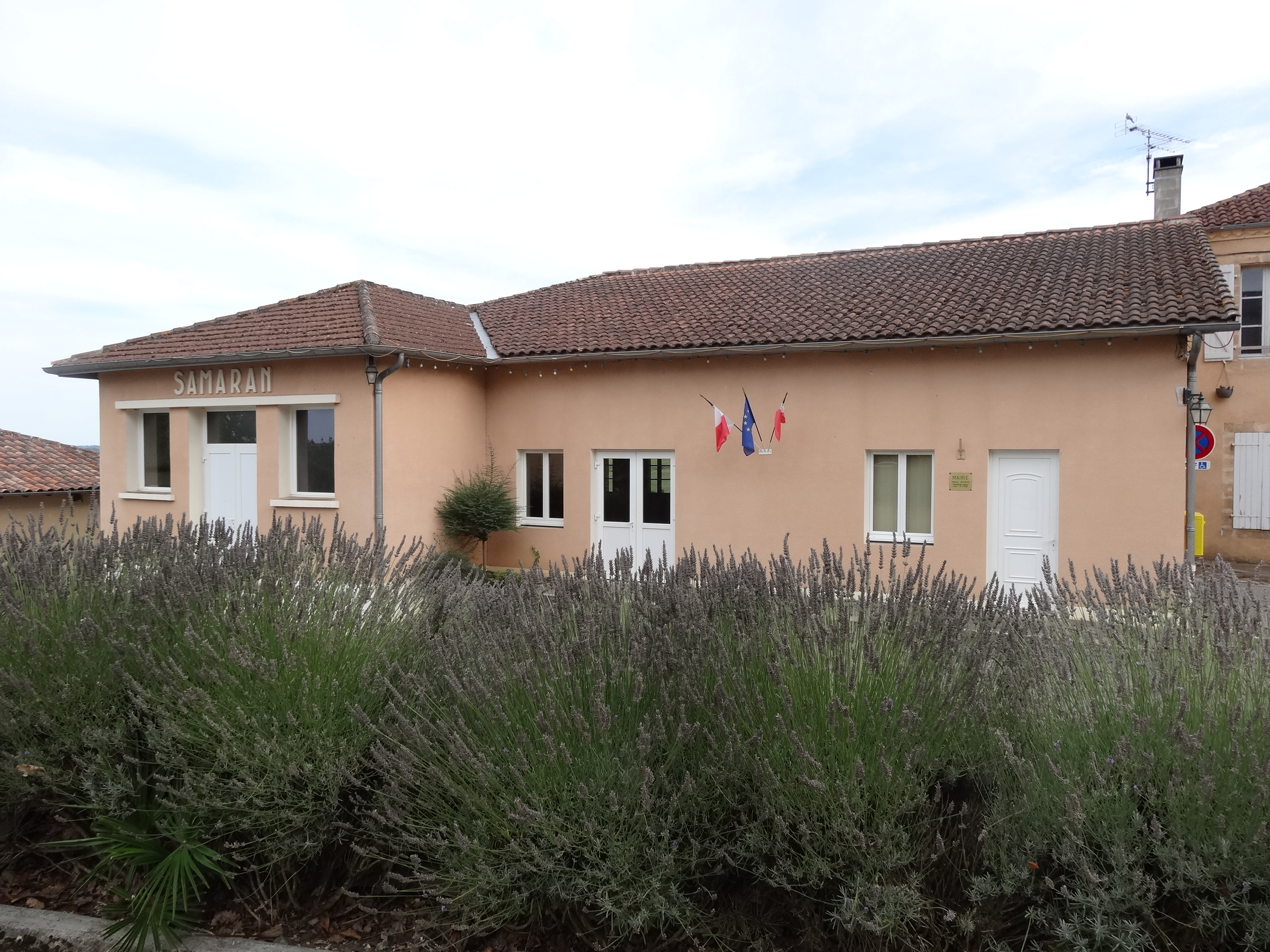
- The town hall in Samaran
- Location of Samaran
- Location within France Location within Occitanie
- Coordinates: 43°23′31″N 0°31′19″E
- Country: France
- Region: Occitania
- Department: Gers
- Arrondissement: Mirande
- Canton: Astarac-Gimone

Government
  - Mayor (2020–2026): Éric Thore
- Area^{1}: 8.61 km^{2} (3.32 sq mi)
- Highest elevation: 333 m (1,093 ft)
- Lowest elevation: 218 m (715 ft)
- Population (2023): 74
  - Density: 8.6/km^{2} (22/sq mi)
- Time zone: UTC+01:00 (CET)
  - Summer (DST): UTC+02:00 (CEST)
- INSEE/Postal code: 32409 /32140
- ^{1} French Land Register data, which excludes lakes, ponds, glaciers > 1 km^{2} (0.386 sq mi or 247 acres) and river estuaries.

Samaran (French pronunciation: [samaʁɑ̃]) is a commune in the Gers department in southwestern France.

== Geography ==
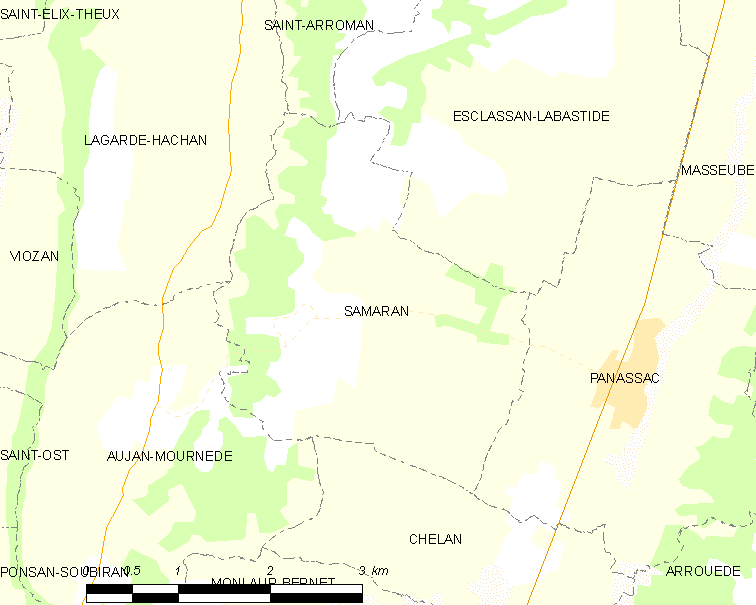
Samaran and its surrounding communes

== Population ==
Historical population
Year	Pop.	±% p.a.
1968	136	—
1975	129	−0.75%
1982	112	−2.00%
1990	95	−2.04%
1999	94	−0.12%
2007	92	−0.27%
2012	84	−1.80%
2017	90	+1.39%
2023	74	−3.21%
Source: INSEE

== See also ==
- Communes of the Gers department
