= Saint-Arroman, Gers =

Saint-Arroman
- Commune
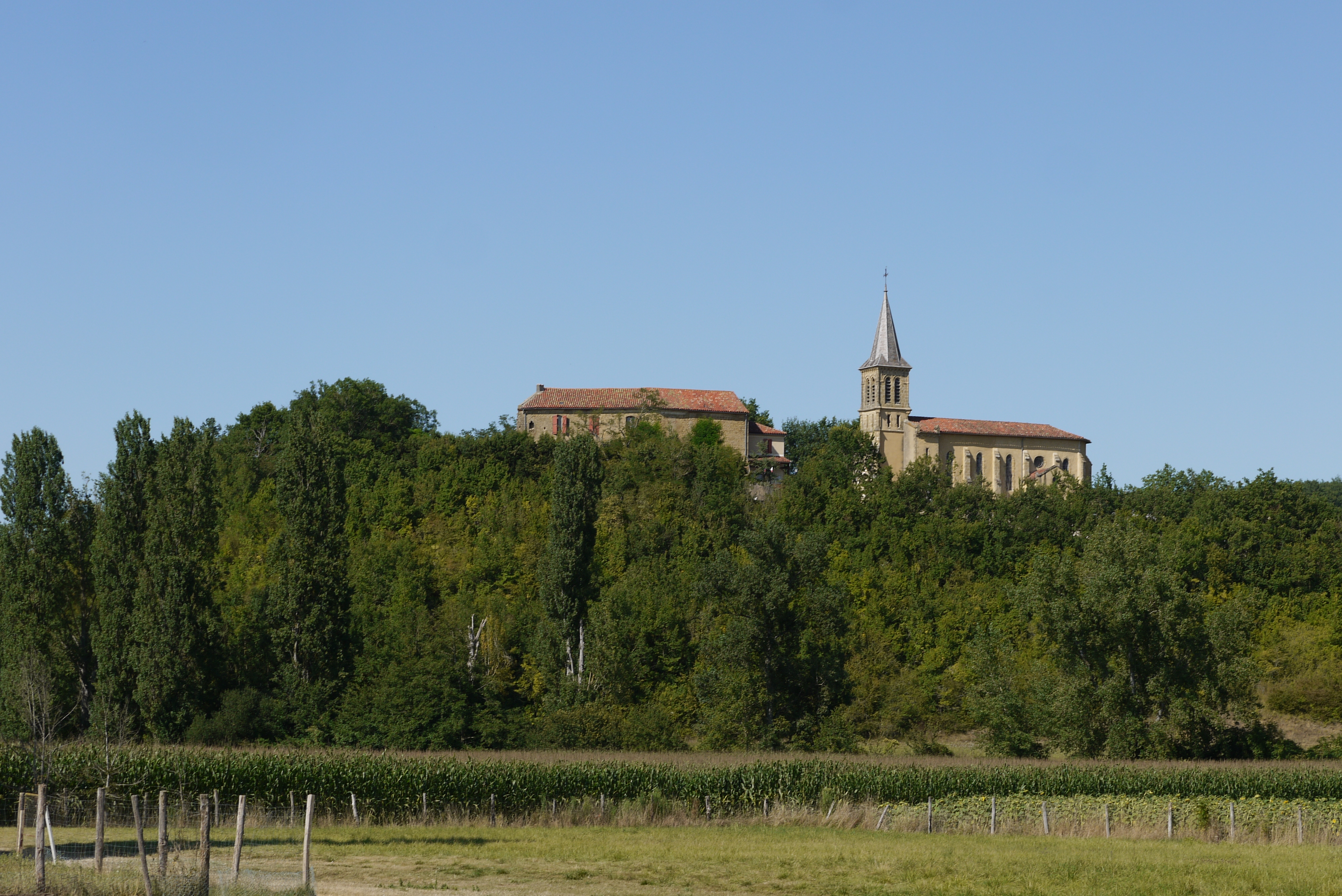
- A general view of Saint-Arroman
- Location of Saint-Arroman
- Location within France Location within Occitanie
- Coordinates: 43°26′20″N 0°31′20″E
- Country: France
- Region: Occitania
- Department: Gers
- Arrondissement: Mirande
- Canton: Astarac-Gimone

Government
  - Mayor (2020–2026): Jean-René Brun
- Area^{1}: 11.97 km^{2} (4.62 sq mi)
- Elevation: 211 m (692 ft)
- Highest elevation: 304 m (997 ft)
- Lowest elevation: 192 m (630 ft)
- Population (2023): 125
  - Density: 10.4/km^{2} (27.0/sq mi)
- Time zone: UTC+01:00 (CET)
  - Summer (DST): UTC+02:00 (CEST)
- INSEE/Postal code: 32361 /32300
- ^{1} French Land Register data, which excludes lakes, ponds, glaciers > 1 km^{2} (0.386 sq mi or 247 acres) and river estuaries.

Saint-Arroman (French pronunciation: [sɛ̃.t‿aʁɔmɑ̃]; Occitan: Sent Arroman) is a commune in the Gers department in southwestern France.

== Geography ==
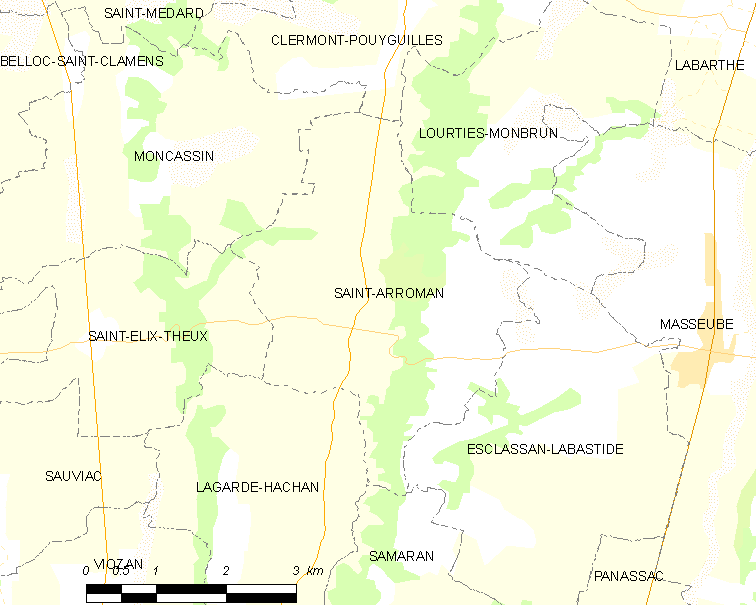
Saint-Arroman and its surrounding communes

== Population ==
Historical population
Year	Pop.	±% p.a.
1968	173	—
1975	163	−0.85%
1982	154	−0.81%
1990	132	−1.91%
1999	126	−0.52%
2007	137	+1.05%
2012	134	−0.44%
2017	137	+0.44%
2023	125	−1.52%
Source: INSEE

== See also ==
- Communes of the Gers department
