= Labarthe, Gers =

Labarthe
- Commune
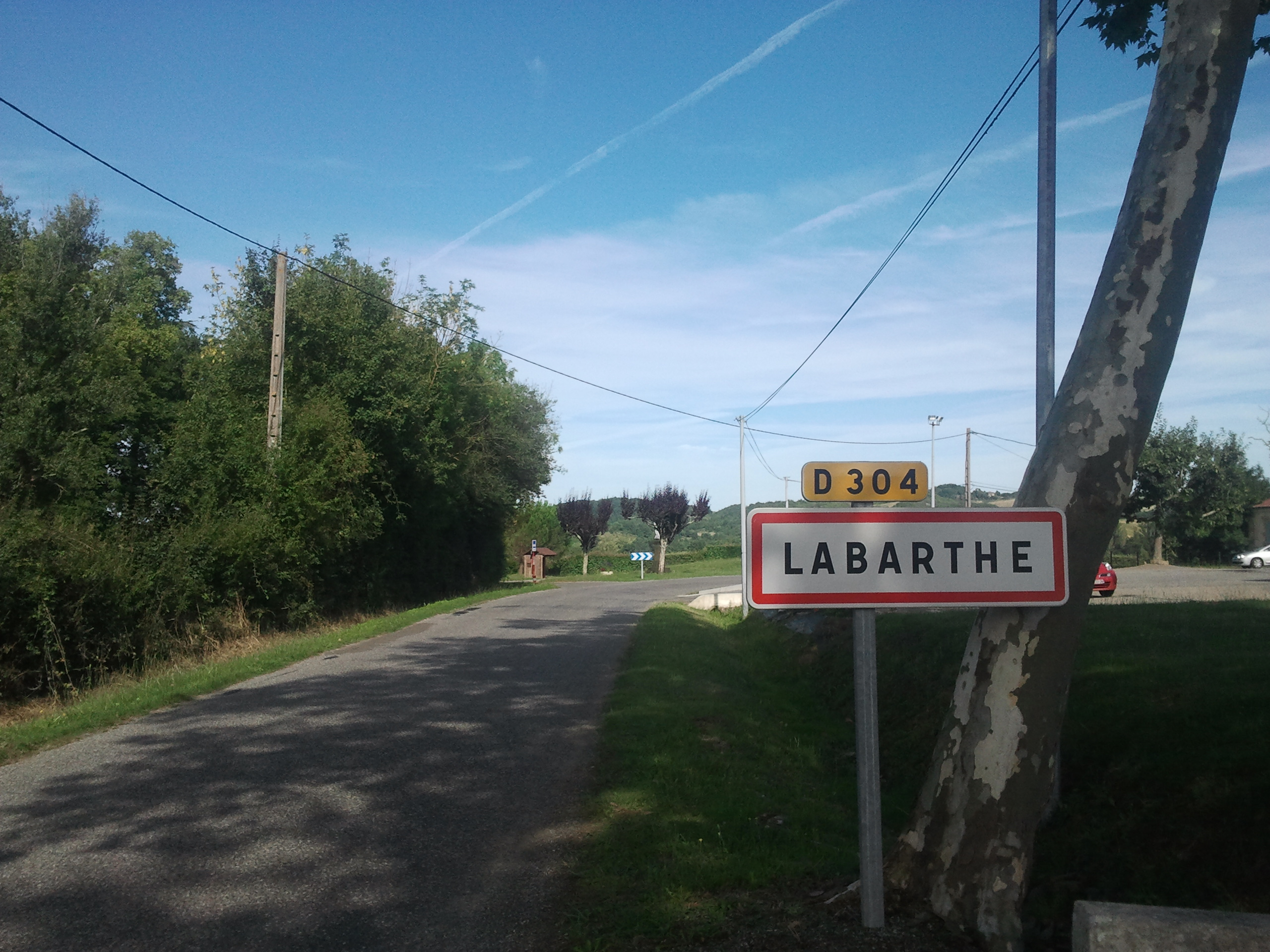
- The road into Labarthe
- Location of Labarthe
- Location within France Location within Occitanie
- Coordinates: 43°28′32″N 0°34′51″E
- Country: France
- Region: Occitania
- Department: Gers
- Arrondissement: Mirande
- Canton: Astarac-Gimone
- Intercommunality: Val de Gers

Government
  - Mayor (2020–2026): Pierre Doux
- Area^{1}: 6.46 km^{2} (2.49 sq mi)
- Elevation: 199 m (653 ft)
- Highest elevation: 261 m (856 ft)
- Lowest elevation: 180 m (590 ft)
- Population (2023): 148
  - Density: 22.9/km^{2} (59.3/sq mi)
- Time zone: UTC+01:00 (CET)
  - Summer (DST): UTC+02:00 (CEST)
- INSEE/Postal code: 32169 /32260
- ^{1} French Land Register data, which excludes lakes, ponds, glaciers > 1 km^{2} (0.386 sq mi or 247 acres) and river estuaries.

Labarthe (French pronunciation: [labaʁt]; Occitan: La Barta) is a commune in the Gers department in southwestern France.

== Geography ==
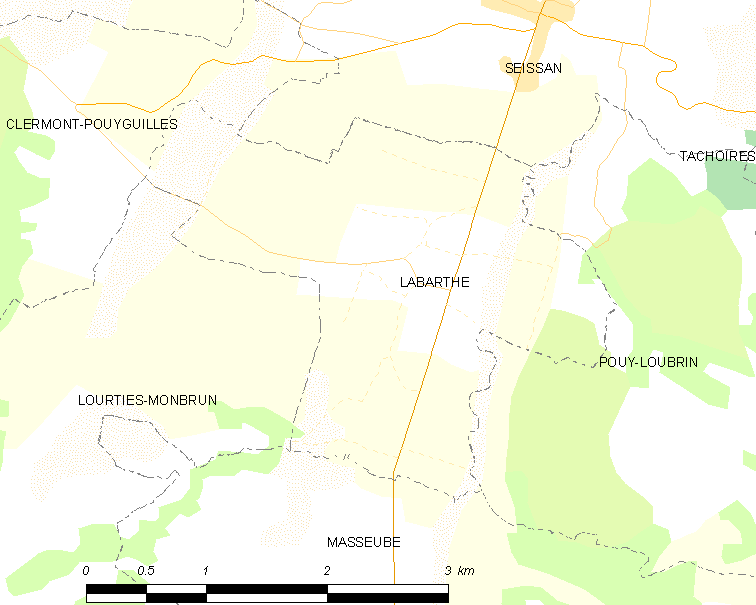
Labarthe and its surrounding communes

== Population ==
Historical population
Year	Pop.	±% p.a.
1968	128	—
1975	147	+2.00%
1982	135	−1.21%
1990	151	+1.41%
1999	142	−0.68%
2007	159	+1.42%
2012	166	+0.87%
2017	153	−1.62%
2023	148	−0.55%
Source: INSEE

== See also ==
- Communes of the Gers department
