= Monlaur-Bernet =

- Commune
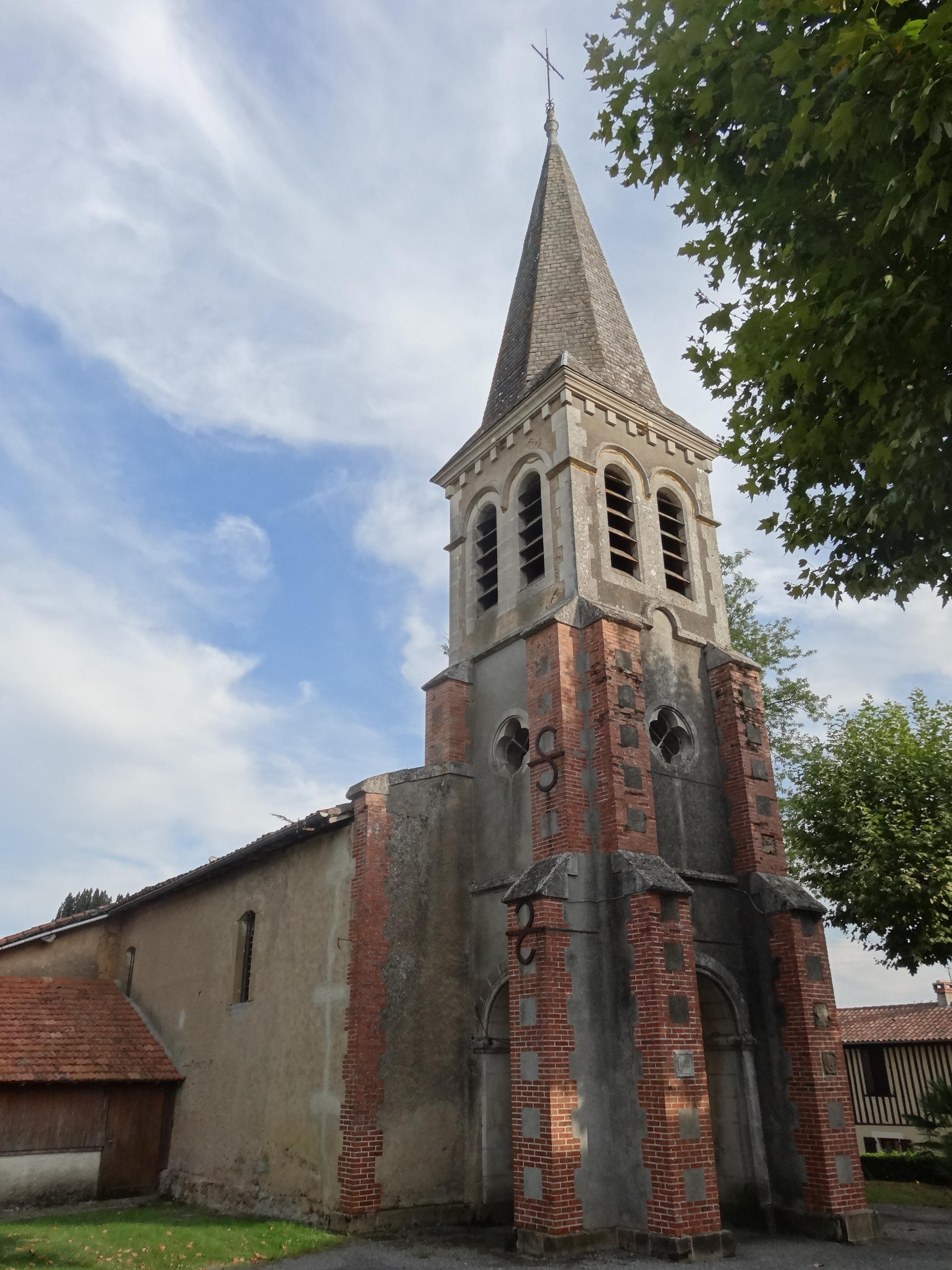
- The church in Monlaur-Bernet

- Coat of arms
- Location of Monlaur-Bernet
- Location within France Location within Occitanie
- Coordinates: 43°21′09″N 0°30′45″E
- Country: France
- Region: Occitania
- Department: Gers
- Arrondissement: Mirande
- Canton: Astarac-Gimone
- Intercommunality: Val de Gers

Government
  - Mayor (2020–2026): Fabienne Nassans
- Area^{1}: 12.21 km^{2} (4.71 sq mi)
- Elevation: 360 m (1,180 ft)
- Highest elevation: 376 m (1,234 ft)
- Lowest elevation: 237 m (778 ft)
- Population (2023): 163
  - Density: 13.3/km^{2} (34.6/sq mi)
- Time zone: UTC+01:00 (CET)
  - Summer (DST): UTC+02:00 (CEST)
- INSEE/Postal code: 32272 /32140
- ^{1} French Land Register data, which excludes lakes, ponds, glaciers > 1 km^{2} (0.386 sq mi or 247 acres) and river estuaries.

Monlaur-Bernet (French pronunciation: [mɔ̃lɔʁ bɛʁnɛ]; Occitan: Montlaur e Vernet) is a commune in the Gers department in southwestern France.

== Geography ==
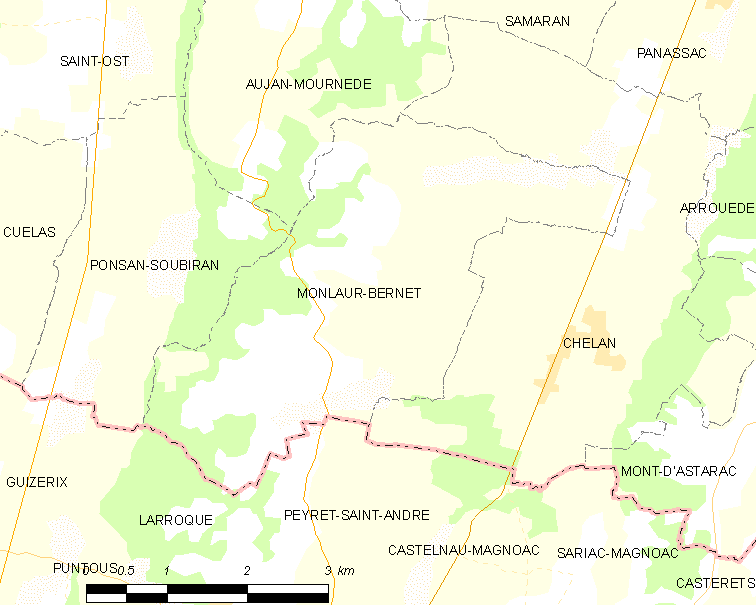
Monlaur-Bernet and its surrounding communes

== Population ==
Historical population
Year	Pop.	±% p.a.
1968	263	—
1975	246	−0.95%
1982	205	−2.57%
1990	189	−1.01%
1999	161	−1.77%
2007	163	+0.15%
2012	182	+2.23%
2017	161	−2.42%
2023	163	+0.21%
Source: INSEE

== See also ==
- Communes of the Gers department
