= Gimont =

- Commune
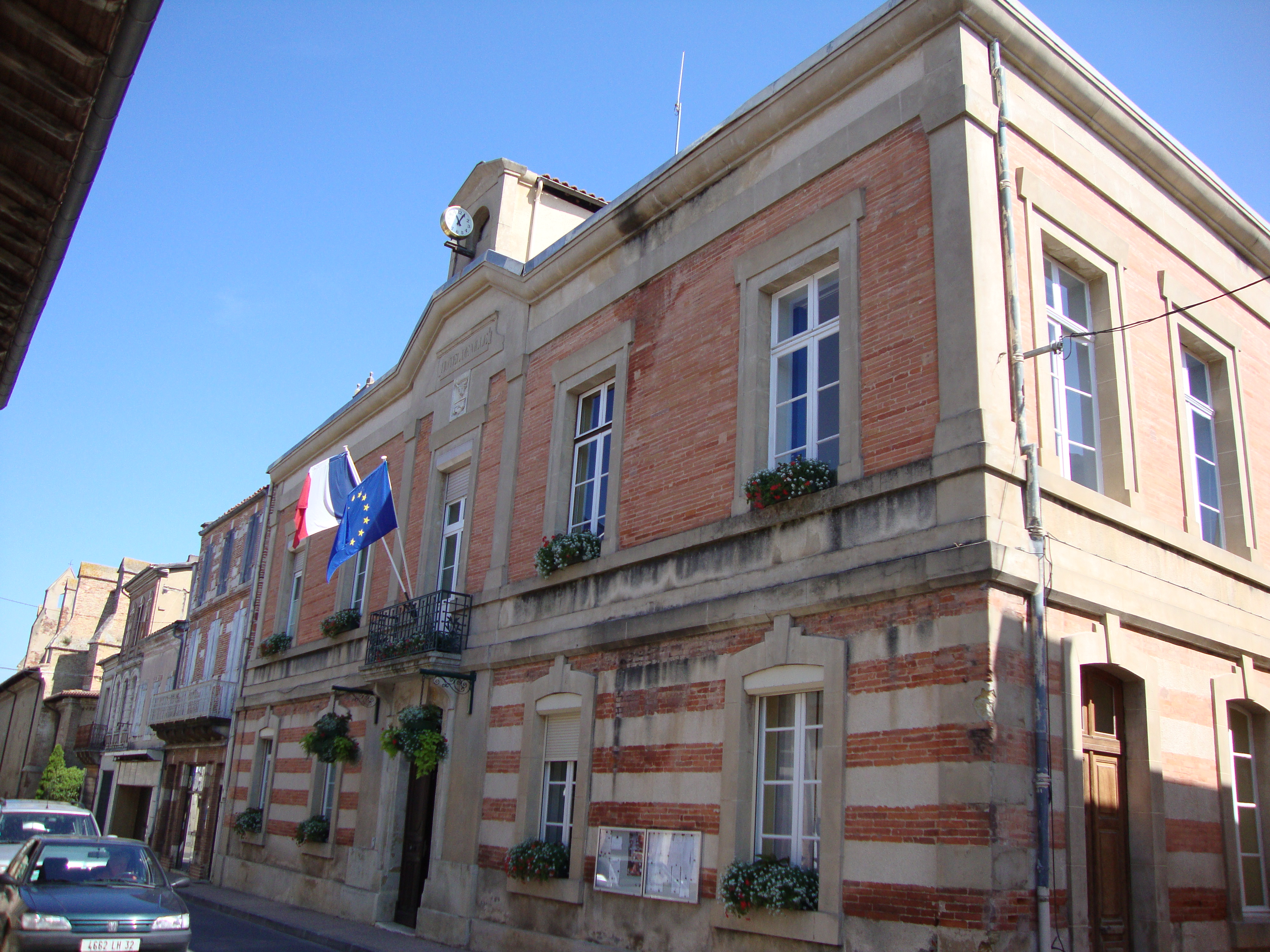
- The town hall

- Coat of arms
- Location of Gimont
- Location within France Location within Occitanie
- Coordinates: 43°37′39″N 0°52′39″E
- Country: France
- Region: Occitania
- Department: Gers
- Arrondissement: Auch
- Canton: Gimone-Arrats

Government
  - Mayor (2020–2026): Franck Villeneuve
- Area^{1}: 27.58 km^{2} (10.65 sq mi)
- Elevation: 180 m (590 ft)
- Highest elevation: 232 m (761 ft)
- Lowest elevation: 144 m (472 ft)
- Population (2023): 3,146
  - Density: 114.1/km^{2} (295.4/sq mi)
- Time zone: UTC+01:00 (CET)
  - Summer (DST): UTC+02:00 (CEST)
- INSEE/Postal code: 32147 /32200
- ^{1} French Land Register data, which excludes lakes, ponds, glaciers > 1 km^{2} (0.386 sq mi or 247 acres) and river estuaries.

Gimont (French pronunciation: [ʒimɔ̃]; Occitan pronunciation: [dʒiˈmunt]) is a commune in the Gers department in southwestern France. It is about 40 km (25 mi) west of Toulouse. It is the seat (capital) of the canton of Gimone-Arrats.

== Geography ==
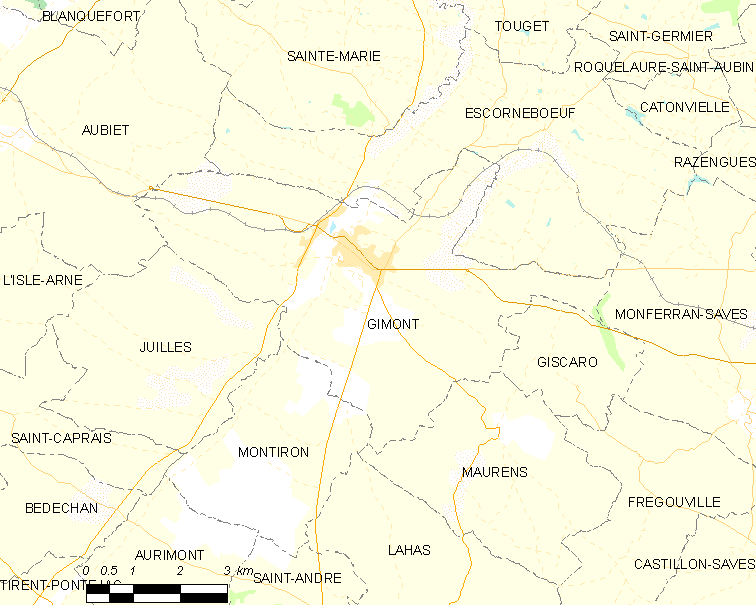
Gimont and its surrounding communes

The commune is bordered by seven other communes: Escornebœuf to the north, Monferran-Savès to the northeast, Giscaro to the east, Maurens to the southeast, Montiron to the south, Juilles to the west, and finally by Aubiet to the northwest.

== Population ==
Historical population
Year	Pop.	±% p.a.
1968	2,878	—
1975	2,867	−0.05%
1982	2,950	+0.41%
1990	2,819	−0.57%
1999	2,734	−0.34%
2007	2,906	+0.77%
2012	2,820	−0.60%
2017	3,032	+1.46%
2023	3,146	+0.62%
Source: INSEE

== International relations ==
Gimont is twinned with Enniscorthy in Ireland.

== See also ==
- Communes of the Gers department
