= Comtesse du Barry (company) =

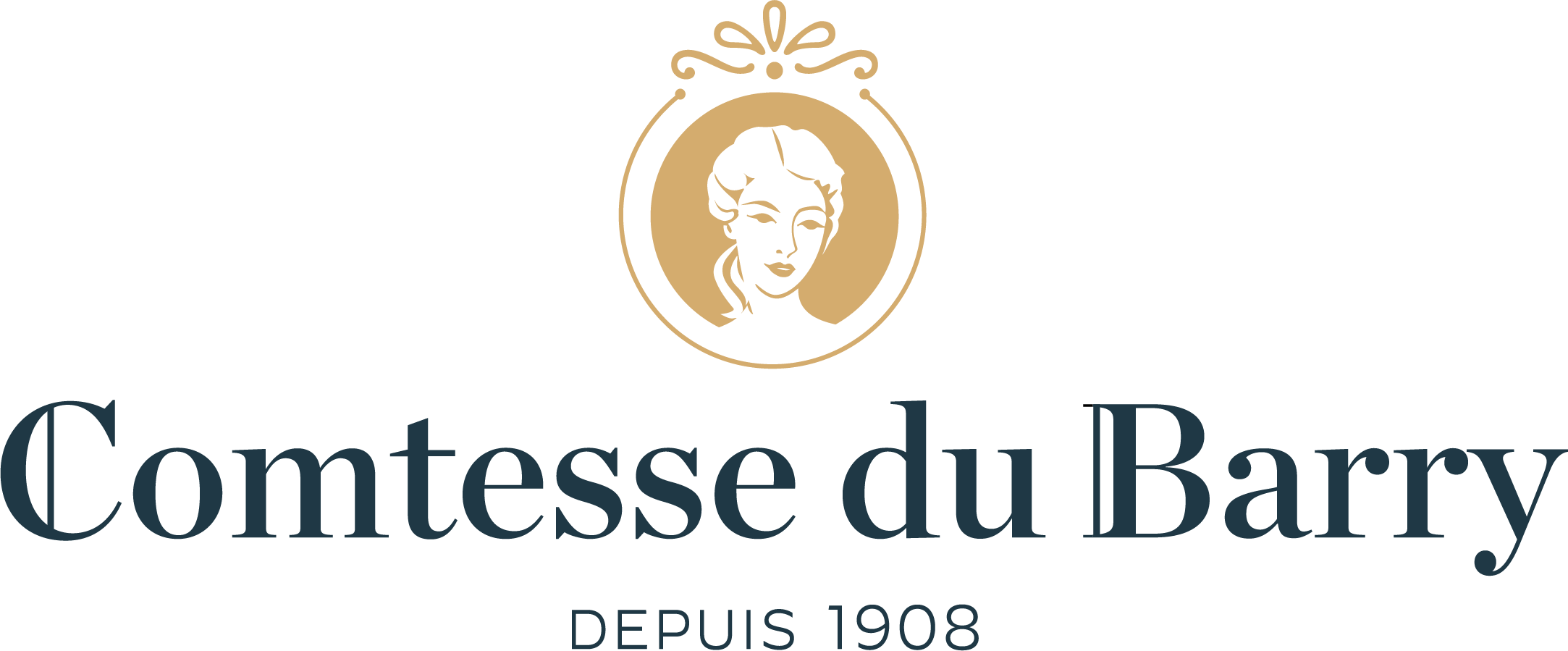
Comtesse du Barry logo

Comtesse du Barry is a French food company and subsidiary of the Maïsadour group. Founded by Joseph and Gabrielle Dubarry in 1908, it specializes in foie gras and ready-made meals.

== History ==
In 1908, Joseph Dubarry, a tinsmith, and his wife Gabrielle, a charcutier, decided to join forces to produce foie gras, sold in their grocery store in Gimont and at exhibition fairs.

In 1936, Comtesse du Barry began mail order sales and became the first mail order company in the foie gras sector. In 1949, Yvette Lacroix Dubarry, daughter of the founders, developed the first fine canned cooked dishes. In 1954, the process for manufacturing the block of foie gras was developed by the founders' son-in-law, Henri Lacroix. This process makes it possible to mix pieces of several livers in order to obtain a product with a homogeneous consistency, ideal for spreading and a democratization of occasions for consuming foie gras.

In 1974, a postal strike blocked all of the company's deliveries for two months. The company decided to open a network of stores so it would no longer be dependent on La Poste. In 1975, the first Comtesse du Barry boutique opened its doors in Gimont.

In 2006, Luc Bramel, a great-grandson of the founders, was appointed general manager.

In June 2011, Comtesse du Barry was acquired by the Maïsadour group. Thierry Blandinières became president and Luc Bramel retained the position of sole general director, all jobs are retained.

In November 2015, Comtesse du Barry closed the Gimont production site and transferred its staff to Fleurance.

In April 2018, after several years of losses and decline in staff, Comtesse du Barry claimed in the Journal du Dimanche (JDD) to have found the path to profits and growth.
