= Blanquefort =

Blanquefort may refer to:

- Blanquefort, Gers, a commune in the Gers department in south-western France
- Blanquefort, Gironde, an outlying commune of the Bordeaux agglomeration

== See also ==
- Blanquefort-sur-Briolance, in Lot-et-Garonne
