= Montégut, Gers =

Montégut
- Commune
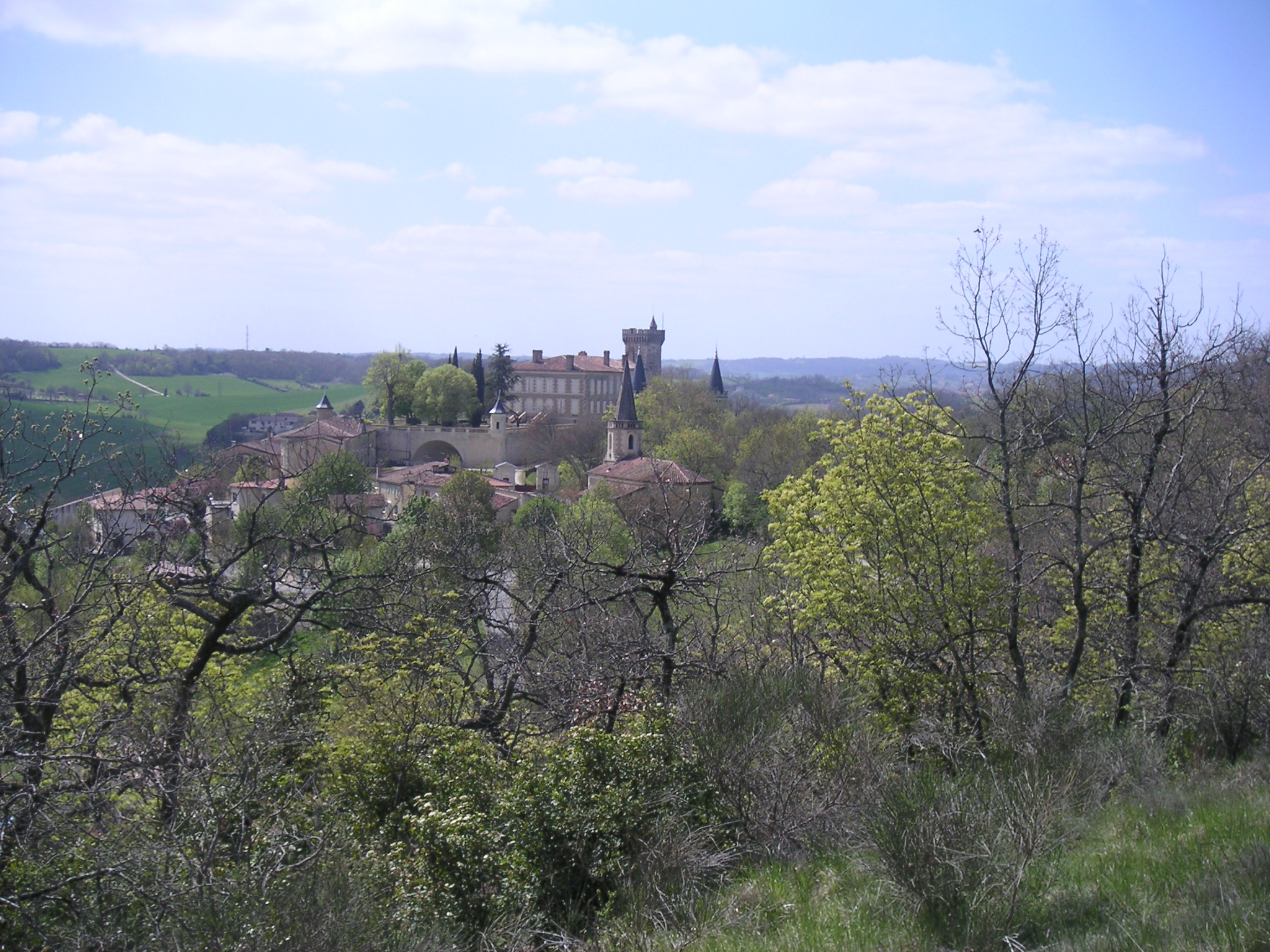
- A general view of Montégut
- Location of Montégut
- Location within France Location within Occitanie
- Coordinates: 43°39′11″N 0°38′47″E
- Country: France
- Region: Occitania
- Department: Gers
- Arrondissement: Auch
- Canton: Auch-2
- Intercommunality: CA Grand Auch Cœur Gascogne

Government
  - Mayor (2020–2026): Jérôme Samalens
- Area^{1}: 11.42 km^{2} (4.41 sq mi)
- Elevation: 200 m (660 ft)
- Highest elevation: 257 m (843 ft)
- Lowest elevation: 135 m (443 ft)
- Population (2023): 719
  - Density: 63.0/km^{2} (163/sq mi)
- Time zone: UTC+01:00 (CET)
  - Summer (DST): UTC+02:00 (CEST)
- INSEE/Postal code: 32282 /32550
- ^{1} French Land Register data, which excludes lakes, ponds, glaciers > 1 km^{2} (0.386 sq mi or 247 acres) and river estuaries.

Montégut (French pronunciation: [mɔ̃teɡy]; Gascon: Montagut) is a commune in the Gers department in southwestern France.

== Geography ==
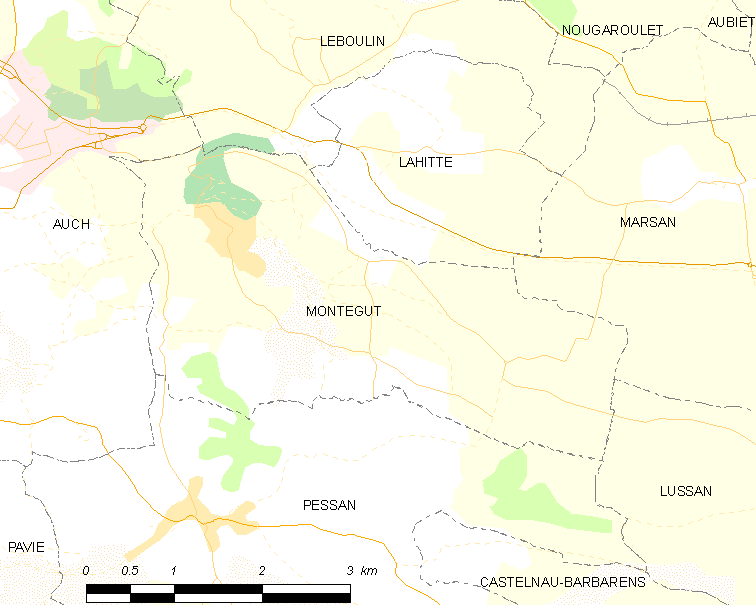
Montégut and its surrounding communes

== Population ==
Historical population
Year	Pop.	±% p.a.
1968	191	—
1975	234	+2.94%
1982	311	+4.15%
1990	317	+0.24%
1999	397	+2.53%
2007	467	+2.05%
2012	614	+5.63%
2017	667	+1.67%
2023	719	+1.26%
Source: INSEE

== See also ==
- Communes of the Gers department
