= Saint-Caprais, Gers =

Saint-Caprais
- Commune
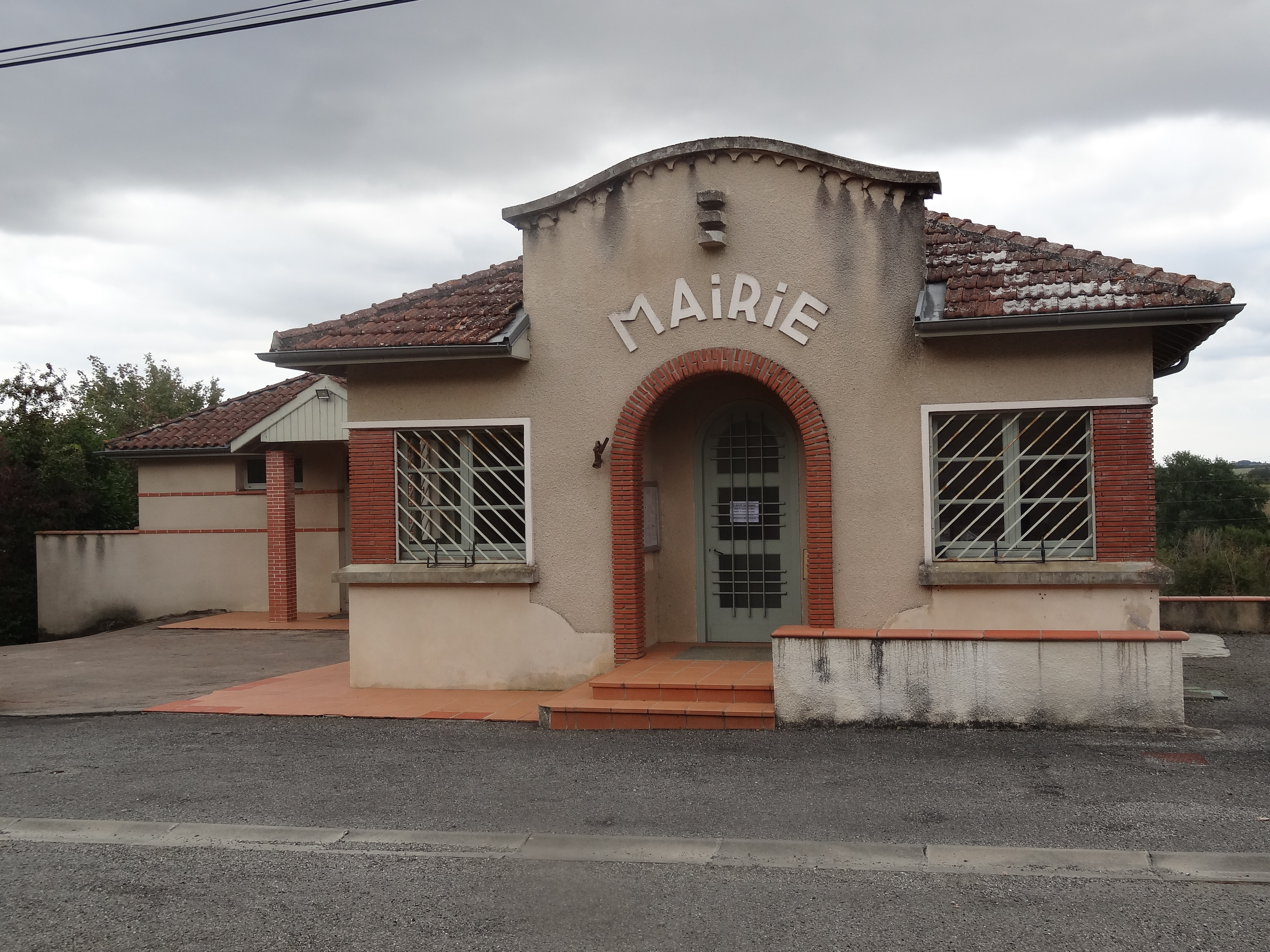
- The town hall in Saint-Caprais
- Location of Saint-Caprais
- Location within France Location within Occitanie
- Coordinates: 43°35′41″N 0°47′17″E
- Country: France
- Region: Occitania
- Department: Gers
- Arrondissement: Auch
- Canton: Auch-2

Government
  - Mayor (2020–2026): Philippe Gineste
- Area^{1}: 7.89 km^{2} (3.05 sq mi)
- Elevation: 220 m (720 ft)
- Highest elevation: 237 m (778 ft)
- Lowest elevation: 155 m (509 ft)
- Population (2023): 148
  - Density: 18.8/km^{2} (48.6/sq mi)
- Time zone: UTC+01:00 (CET)
  - Summer (DST): UTC+02:00 (CEST)
- INSEE/Postal code: 32467 /32200
- ^{1} French Land Register data, which excludes lakes, ponds, glaciers > 1 km^{2} (0.386 sq mi or 247 acres) and river estuaries.

Saint-Caprais (French pronunciation: [sɛ̃ kapʁɛ]; Gascon: Sent Crabari) is a commune in the Gers department in southwestern France. It was created in 1947 from part of the commune Juilles.

== Geography ==
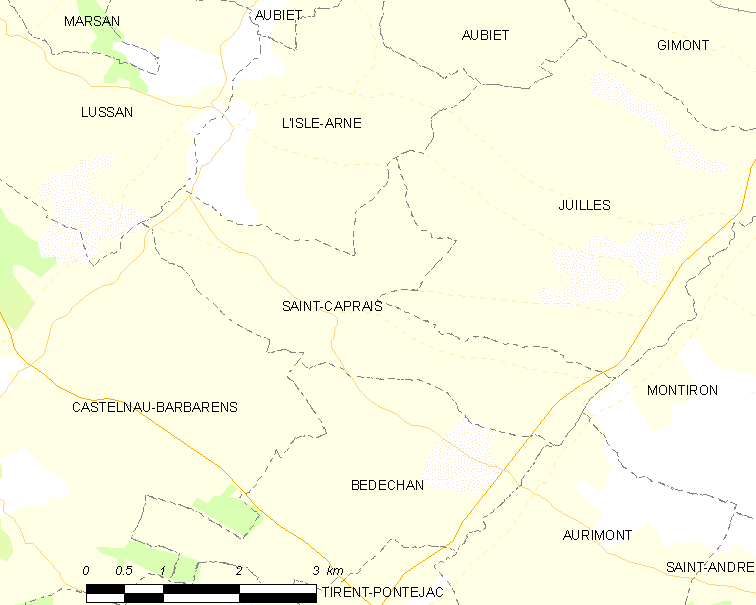
Saint-Caprais and its surrounding communes

== Population ==
Historical population
Year	Pop.	±% p.a.
1968	119	—
1975	104	−1.91%
1982	106	+0.27%
1990	101	−0.60%
1999	102	+0.11%
2007	115	+1.51%
2012	137	+3.56%
2017	139	+0.29%
2023	148	+1.05%
Source: INSEE

== See also ==
- Communes of the Gers department
