= Leboulin =

- Commune
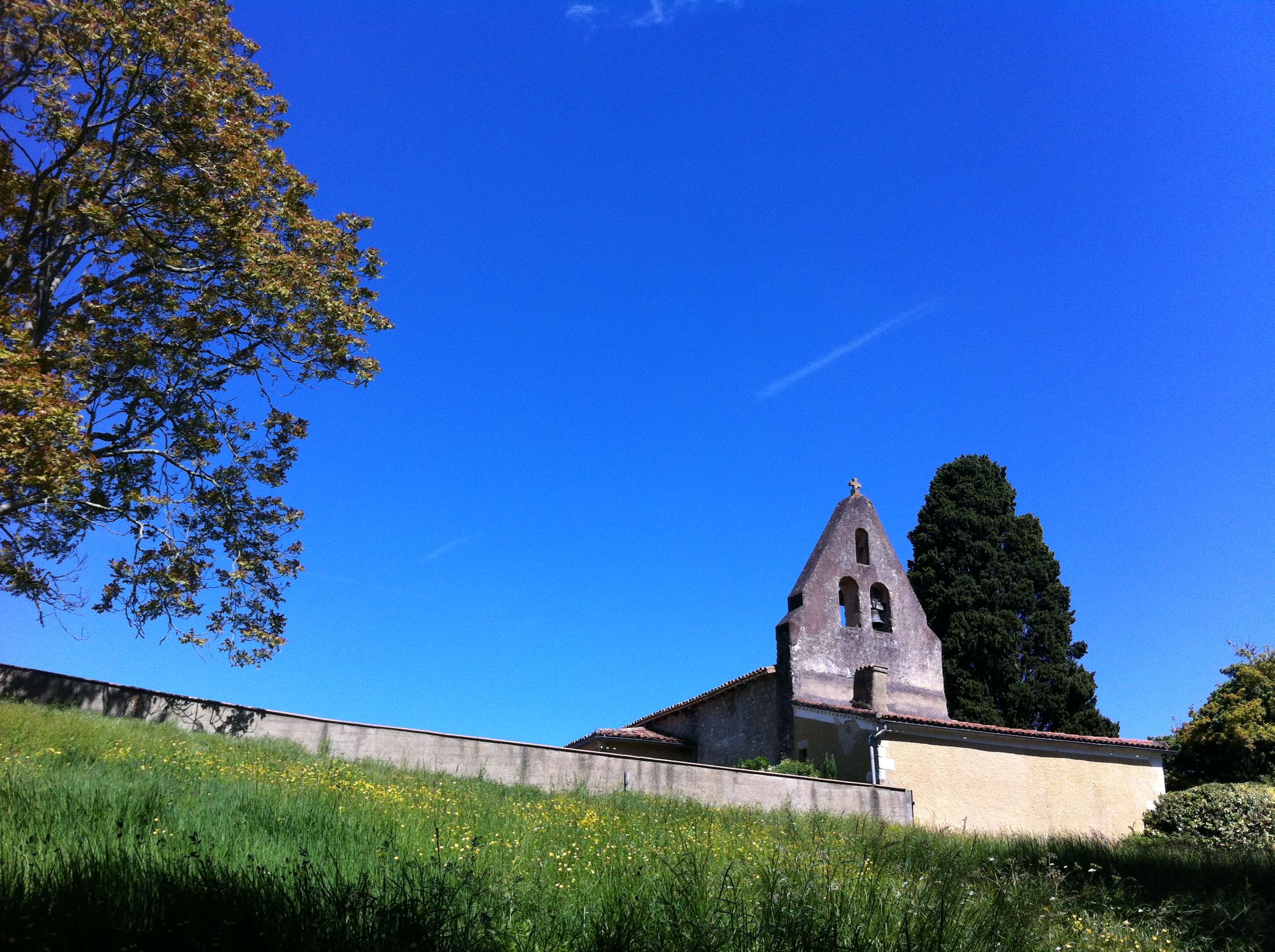
- The chapel in Leboulin
- Location of Leboulin
- Location within France Location within Occitanie
- Coordinates: 43°40′15″N 0°39′46″E
- Country: France
- Region: Occitania
- Department: Gers
- Arrondissement: Auch
- Canton: Auch-2
- Intercommunality: CA Grand Auch Cœur Gascogne

Government
  - Mayor (2020–2026): Christine Lapeyre-Rossi
- Area^{1}: 8.91 km^{2} (3.44 sq mi)
- Elevation: 153 m (502 ft)
- Highest elevation: 258 m (846 ft)
- Lowest elevation: 124 m (407 ft)
- Population (2023): 346
  - Density: 38.8/km^{2} (101/sq mi)
- Time zone: UTC+01:00 (CET)
  - Summer (DST): UTC+02:00 (CEST)
- INSEE/Postal code: 32207 /32810
- ^{1} French Land Register data, which excludes lakes, ponds, glaciers > 1 km^{2} (0.386 sq mi or 247 acres) and river estuaries.

Leboulin (French pronunciation: [ləbulɛ̃]; Occitan: Lo Bolin) is a commune in the Gers department in southwestern France.

== Geography ==
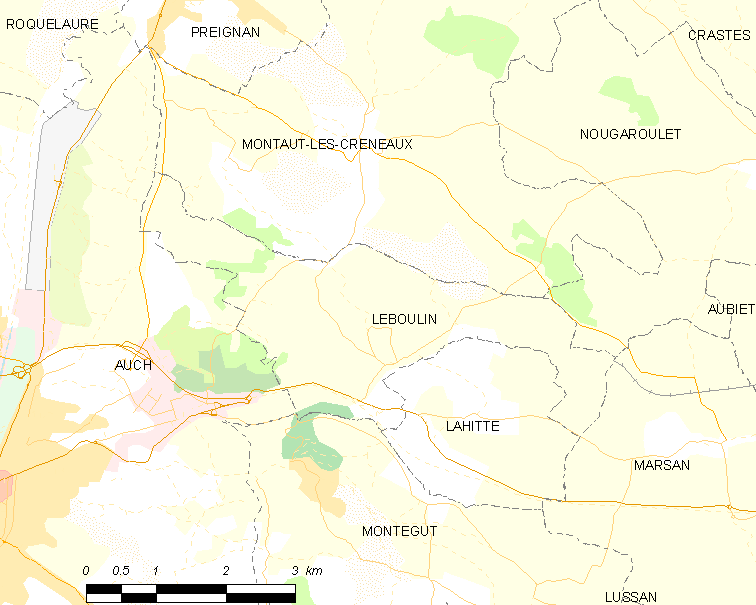
Leboulin and its surrounding communes

== Population ==
Historical population
Year	Pop.	±% p.a.
1968	170	—
1975	120	−4.85%
1982	176	+5.62%
1990	238	+3.84%
1999	285	+2.02%
2007	291	+0.26%
2012	334	+2.79%
2017	346	+0.71%
2023	346	+0.00%
Source: INSEE

== See also ==
- Communes of the Gers department
