= Lussan, Gers =

Lussan
- Commune
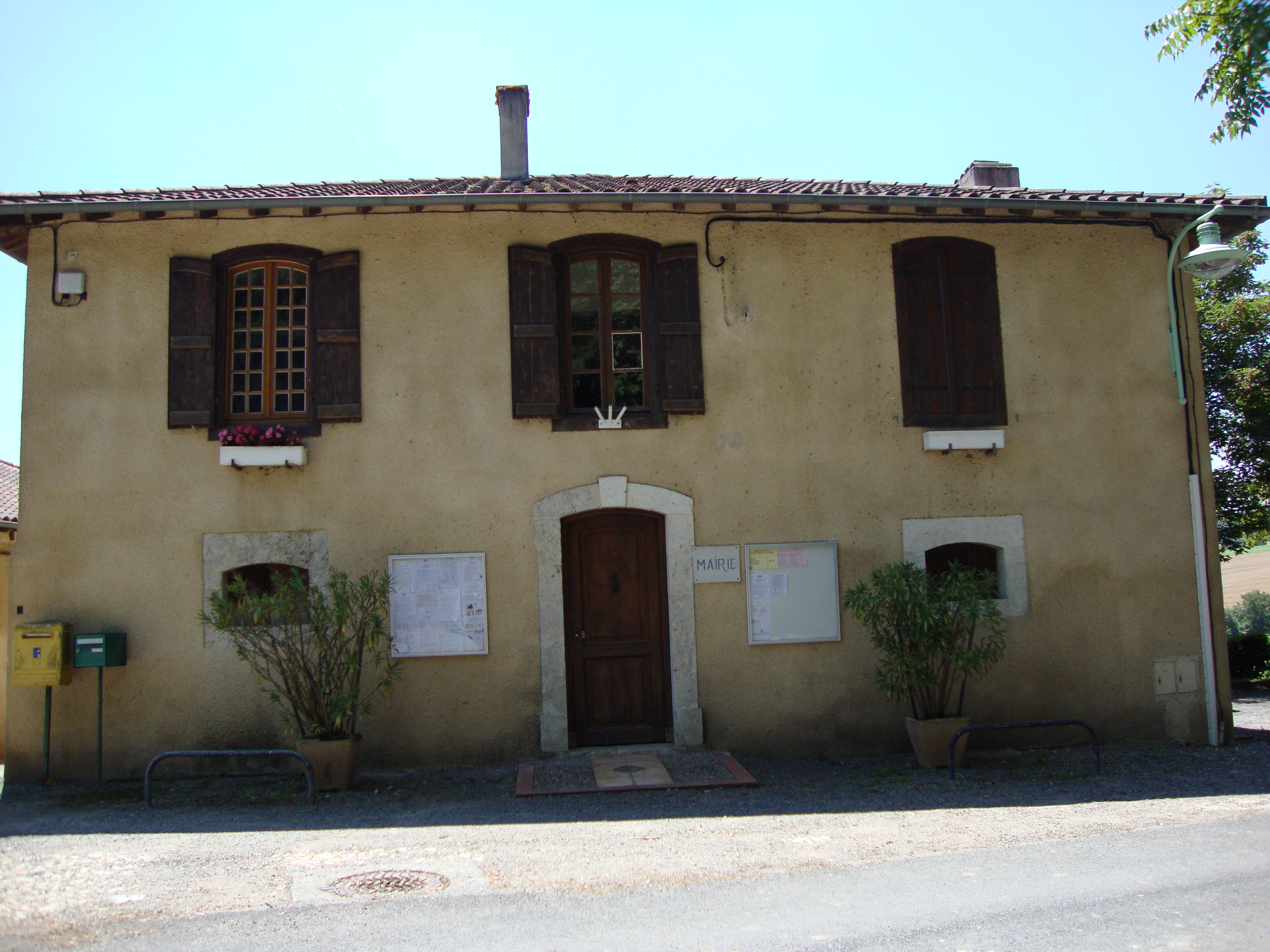
- The town hall

- Coat of arms
- Location of Lussan
- Location within France Location within Occitanie
- Coordinates: 43°37′35″N 0°44′07″E
- Country: France
- Region: Occitania
- Department: Gers
- Arrondissement: Auch
- Canton: Auch-2

Government
  - Mayor (2024–2026): Éric Angelé
- Area^{1}: 12.83 km^{2} (4.95 sq mi)
- Elevation: 185 m (607 ft)
- Highest elevation: 264 m (866 ft)
- Lowest elevation: 147 m (482 ft)
- Population (2023): 216
  - Density: 16.8/km^{2} (43.6/sq mi)
- Time zone: UTC+01:00 (CET)
  - Summer (DST): UTC+02:00 (CEST)
- INSEE/Postal code: 32221 /32270
- ^{1} French Land Register data, which excludes lakes, ponds, glaciers > 1 km^{2} (0.386 sq mi or 247 acres) and river estuaries.

Lussan (French pronunciation: [lysɑ̃]; Occitan: Luçan) is a commune in the Gers department in southwestern France.

== Geography ==
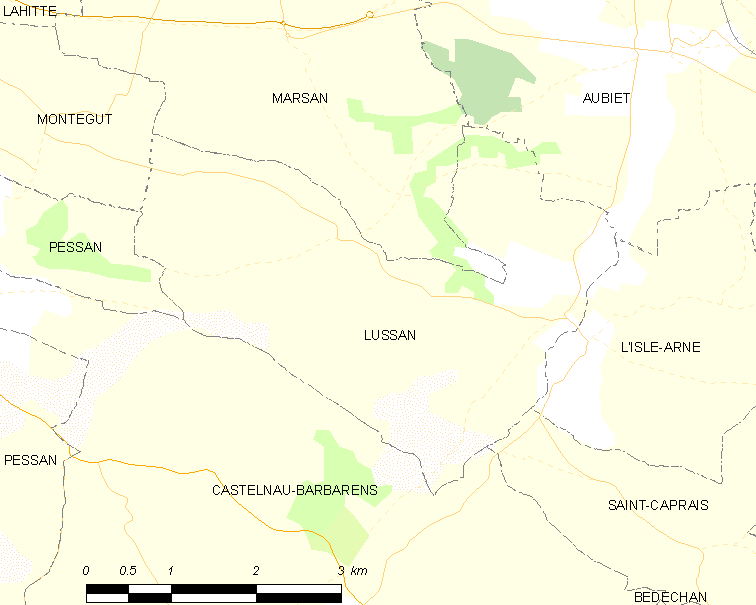
Lussan and its surrounding communes

== Population ==
Historical population
Year	Pop.	±% p.a.
1968	211	—
1975	171	−2.96%
1982	185	+1.13%
1990	211	+1.66%
1999	192	−1.04%
2007	225	+2.00%
2012	229	+0.35%
2017	228	−0.09%
2023	216	−0.90%
Source: INSEE

== See also ==
- Communes of the Gers department
