= Ansan, Gers =

Ansan
- Commune
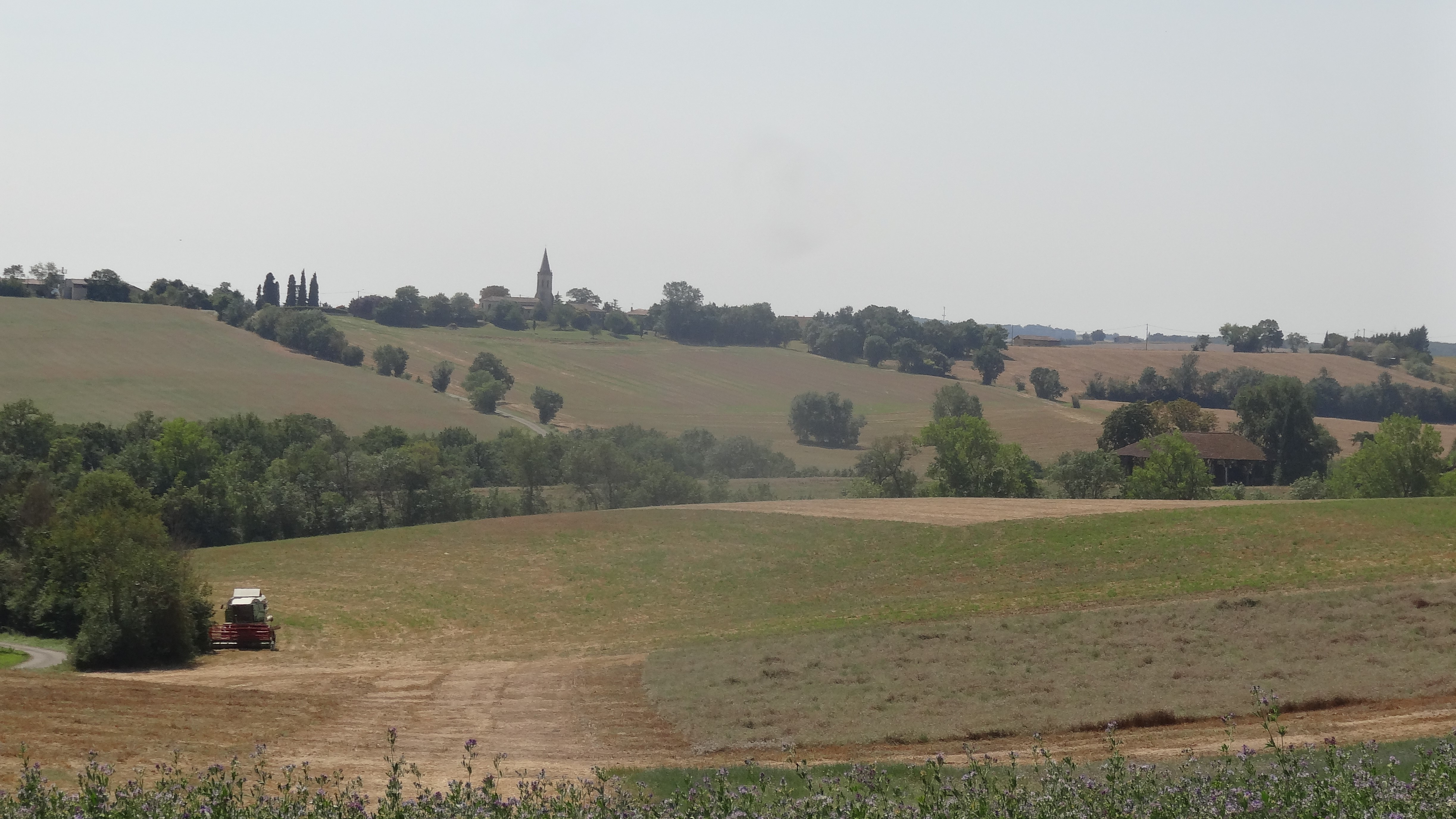
- A general view of Ansan
- Location of Ansan
- Location within France Location within Occitanie
- Coordinates: 43°41′29″N 0°46′31″E
- Country: France
- Region: Occitania
- Department: Gers
- Arrondissement: Auch
- Canton: Auch-2

Government
  - Mayor (2020–2026): Jean-Claude Bady
- Area^{1}: 7.76 km^{2} (3.00 sq mi)
- Elevation: 207 m (679 ft)
- Highest elevation: 212 m (696 ft)
- Lowest elevation: 138 m (453 ft)
- Population (2023): 75
  - Density: 9.7/km^{2} (25/sq mi)
- Time zone: UTC+01:00 (CET)
  - Summer (DST): UTC+02:00 (CEST)
- INSEE/Postal code: 32002 /32270
- ^{1} French Land Register data, which excludes lakes, ponds, glaciers > 1 km^{2} (0.386 sq mi or 247 acres) and river estuaries.

Ansan (French pronunciation: [ɑ̃sɑ̃]) is a commune in the Gers department in southwestern France.

== Geography ==
Ansan is located in the canton of Auch-2 and in the arrondissement of Auch.

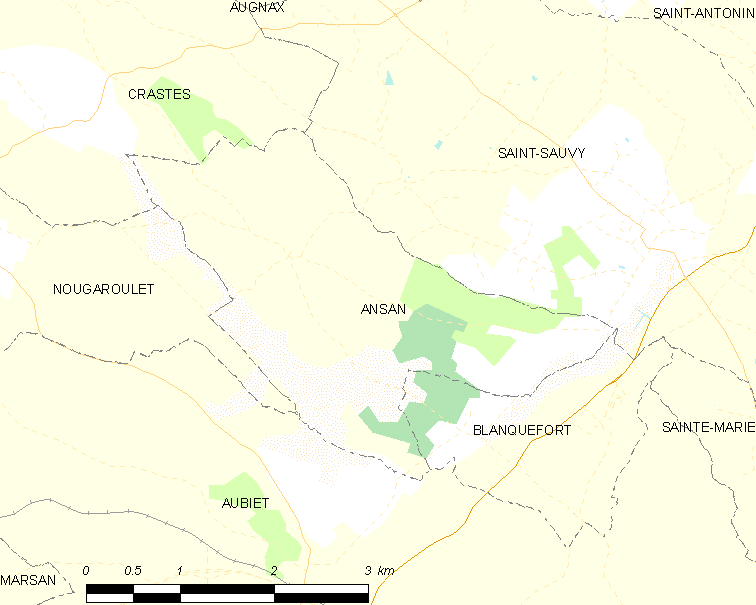
Map of Ansan and its surrounding communes

== Population ==
Historical population
Year	Pop.	±% p.a.
1968	118	—
1975	101	−2.20%
1982	80	−3.28%
1990	68	−2.01%
1999	63	−0.84%
2007	91	+4.70%
2012	94	+0.65%
2017	78	−3.66%
2023	75	−0.65%
Source: INSEE

== See also ==
- Communes of the Gers department
