= Nougaroulet =

- Commune
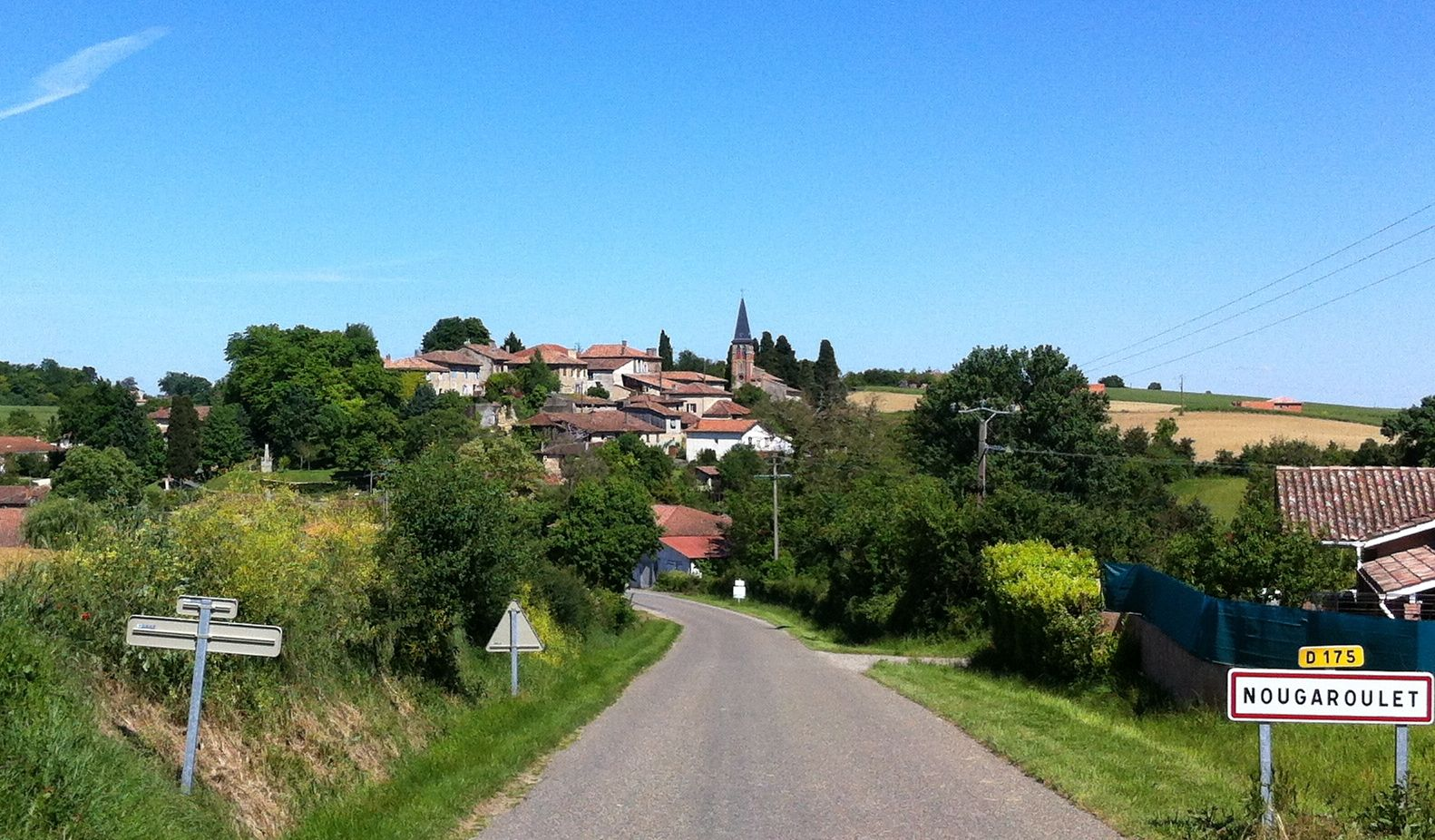
- A general view of Nougaroulet
- Location of Nougaroulet
- Location within France Location within Occitanie
- Coordinates: 43°41′39″N 0°43′55″E
- Country: France
- Region: Occitania
- Department: Gers
- Arrondissement: Auch
- Canton: Auch-2
- Intercommunality: CA Grand Auch Cœur Gascogne

Government
  - Mayor (2020–2026): Pierre-Yves Arnaud
- Area^{1}: 15.79 km^{2} (6.10 sq mi)
- Elevation: 159 m (522 ft)
- Highest elevation: 231 m (758 ft)
- Lowest elevation: 136 m (446 ft)
- Population (2023): 386
  - Density: 24.4/km^{2} (63.3/sq mi)
- Time zone: UTC+01:00 (CET)
  - Summer (DST): UTC+02:00 (CEST)
- INSEE/Postal code: 32298 /32270
- ^{1} French Land Register data, which excludes lakes, ponds, glaciers > 1 km^{2} (0.386 sq mi or 247 acres) and river estuaries.

Nougaroulet (French pronunciation: [nuɡaʁulɛ]; Occitan: Nogarolet) is a commune in the Gers department in southwestern France.

== Geography ==
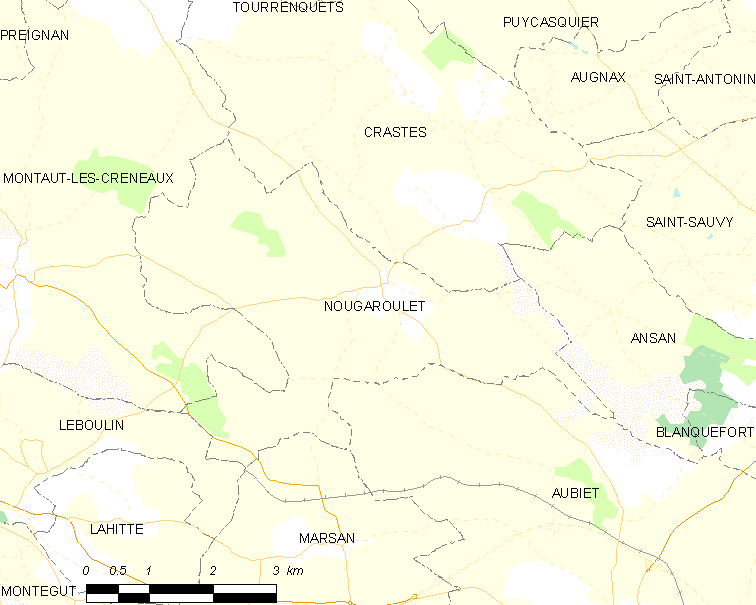
Nougaroulet and its surrounding communes

== Population ==
Historical population
Year	Pop.	±% p.a.
1968	268	—
1975	231	−2.10%
1982	219	−0.76%
1990	249	+1.62%
1999	290	+1.71%
2007	323	+1.36%
2012	369	+2.70%
2017	375	+0.32%
2023	386	+0.48%
Source: INSEE

== See also ==
- Communes of the Gers department
