= Lahitte =

- Commune
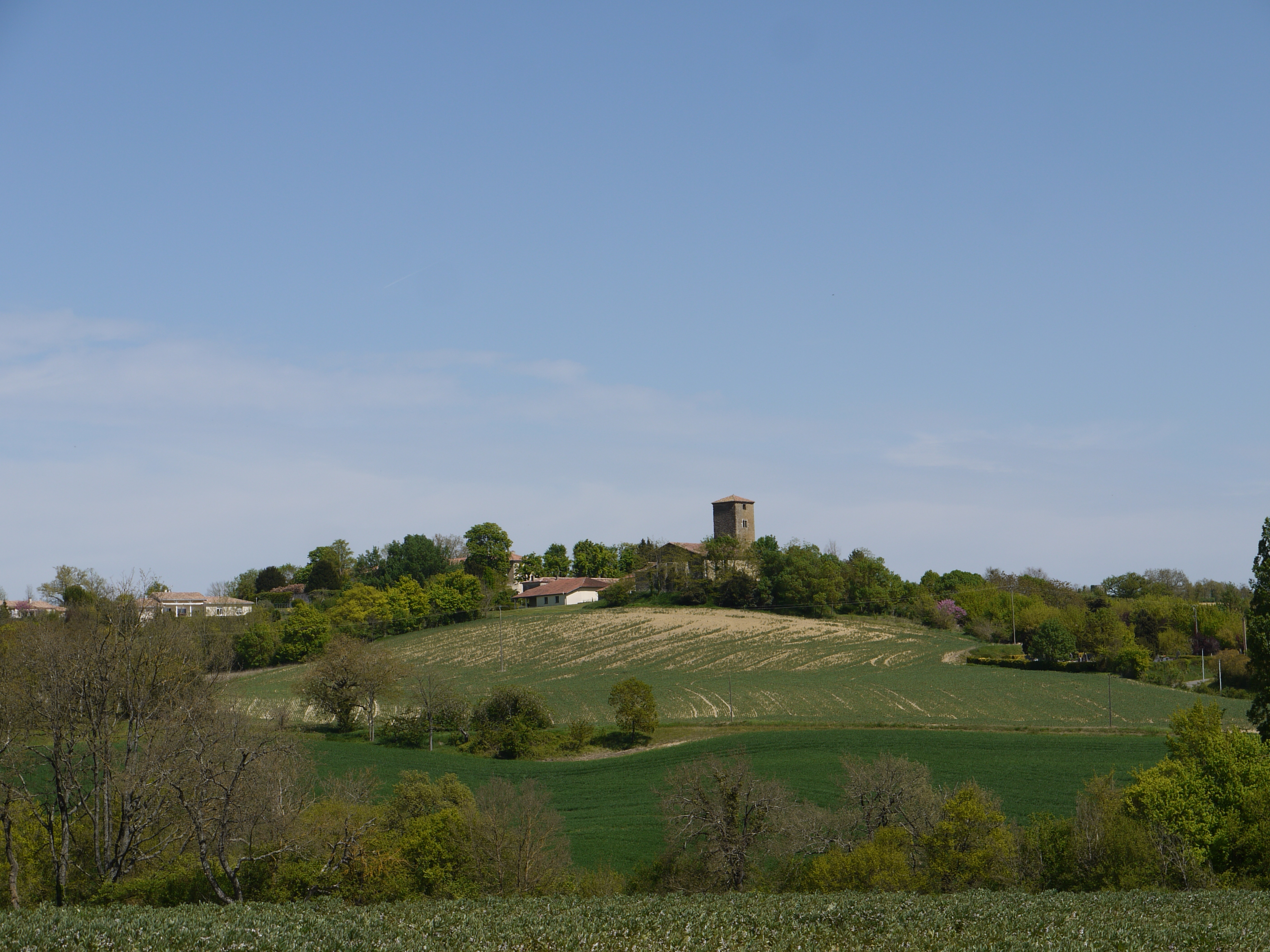
- Lahitte
- Location of Lahitte
- Location within France Location within Occitanie
- Coordinates: 43°39′40″N 0°40′52″E
- Country: France
- Region: Occitania
- Department: Gers
- Arrondissement: Auch
- Canton: Auch-2
- Intercommunality: CA Grand Auch Cœur Gascogne

Government
  - Mayor (2020–2026): Christian Dareoux
- Area^{1}: 5.03 km^{2} (1.94 sq mi)
- Elevation: 170 m (560 ft)
- Highest elevation: 240 m (790 ft)
- Lowest elevation: 148 m (486 ft)
- Population (2023): 235
  - Density: 46.7/km^{2} (121/sq mi)
- Time zone: UTC+01:00 (CET)
  - Summer (DST): UTC+02:00 (CEST)
- INSEE/Postal code: 32183 /32810
- ^{1} French Land Register data, which excludes lakes, ponds, glaciers > 1 km^{2} (0.386 sq mi or 247 acres) and river estuaries.

Lahitte (French pronunciation: [la.it]; Occitan: La Hita) is a commune in the Gers department in southwestern France.

== Geography ==
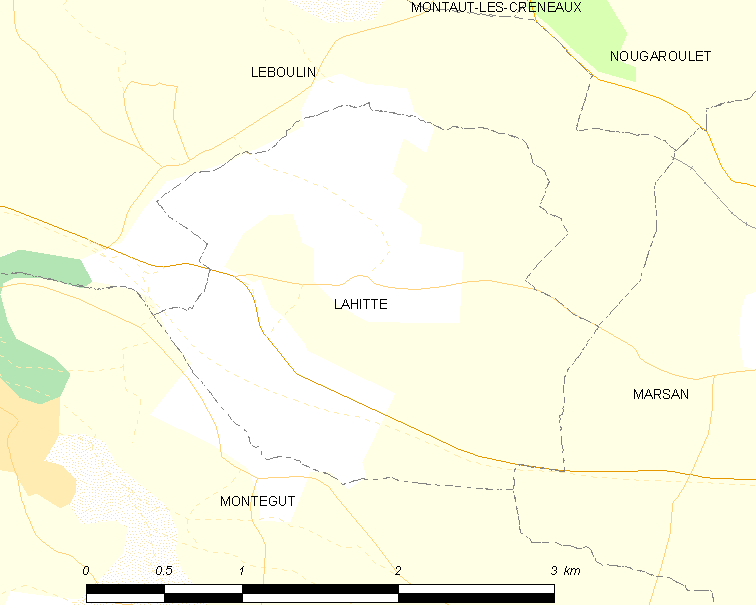
Lahitte and its surrounding communes

== Population ==
Historical population
Year	Pop.	±% p.a.
1968	134	—
1975	143	+0.93%
1982	148	+0.49%
1990	182	+2.62%
1999	185	+0.18%
2007	247	+3.68%
2012	255	+0.64%
2017	247	−0.64%
2023	235	−0.83%
Source: INSEE

== See also ==
- Communes of the Gers department
