= Aubiet =

- Commune
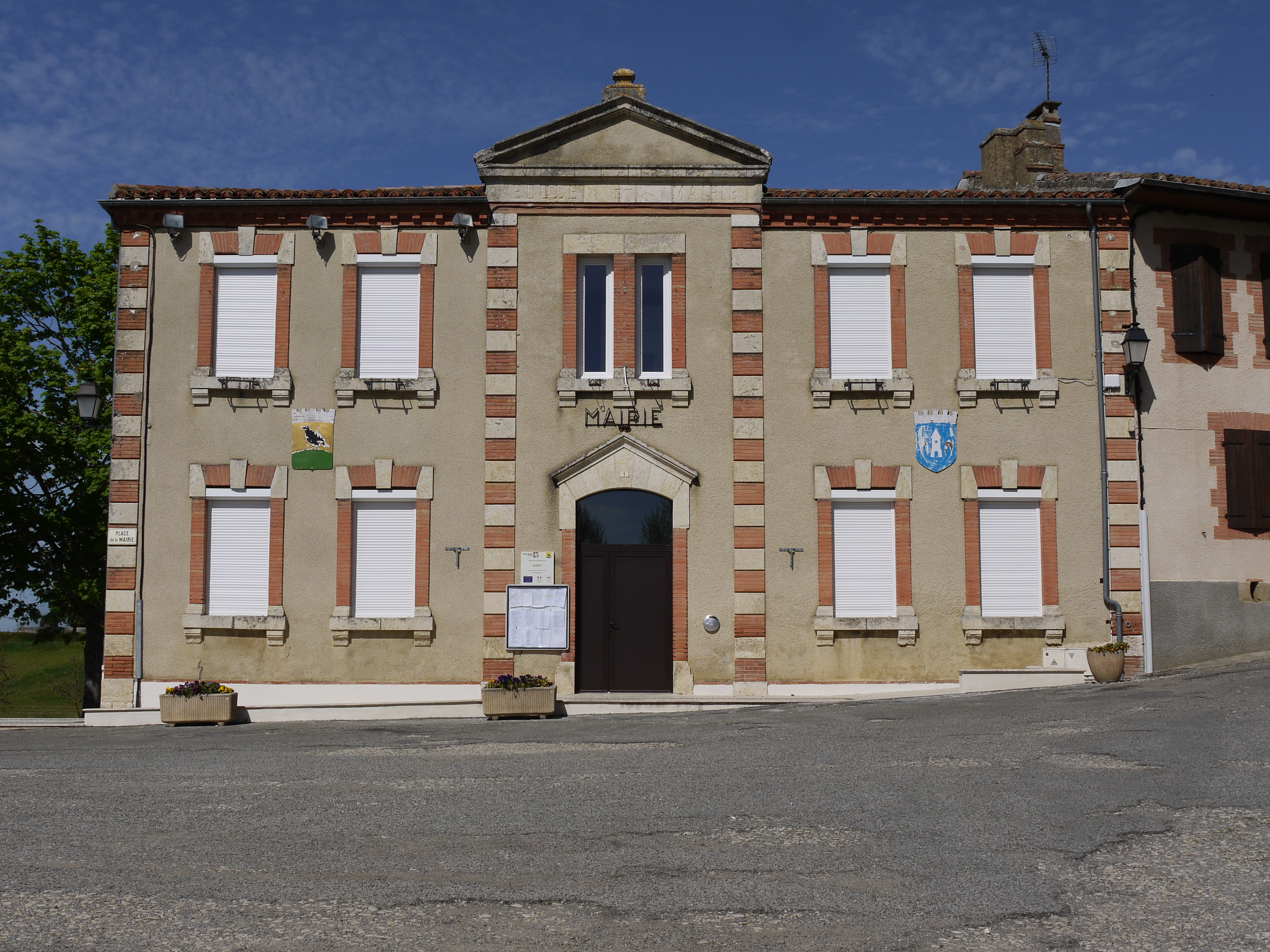
- The town hall in Aubiet

- Coat of arms
- Location of Aubiet
- Location within France Location within Occitanie
- Coordinates: 43°38′49″N 0°47′04″E
- Country: France
- Region: Occitania
- Department: Gers
- Arrondissement: Auch
- Canton: Auch-2
- Intercommunality: CC Coteaux Arrats Gimone

Government
  - Mayor (2020–2026): Jean-Luc Fosse
- Area^{1}: 38.96 km^{2} (15.04 sq mi)
- Elevation: 150 m (490 ft)
- Highest elevation: 233 m (764 ft)
- Lowest elevation: 138 m (453 ft)
- Population (2023): 1,134
  - Density: 29.11/km^{2} (75.39/sq mi)
- Time zone: UTC+01:00 (CET)
  - Summer (DST): UTC+02:00 (CEST)
- INSEE/Postal code: 32012 /32270
- ^{1} French Land Register data, which excludes lakes, ponds, glaciers > 1 km^{2} (0.386 sq mi or 247 acres) and river estuaries.

Aubiet (French pronunciation: [objɛ]) is a commune in the Gers department in southwestern France.

== Geography ==
=== Localisation ===
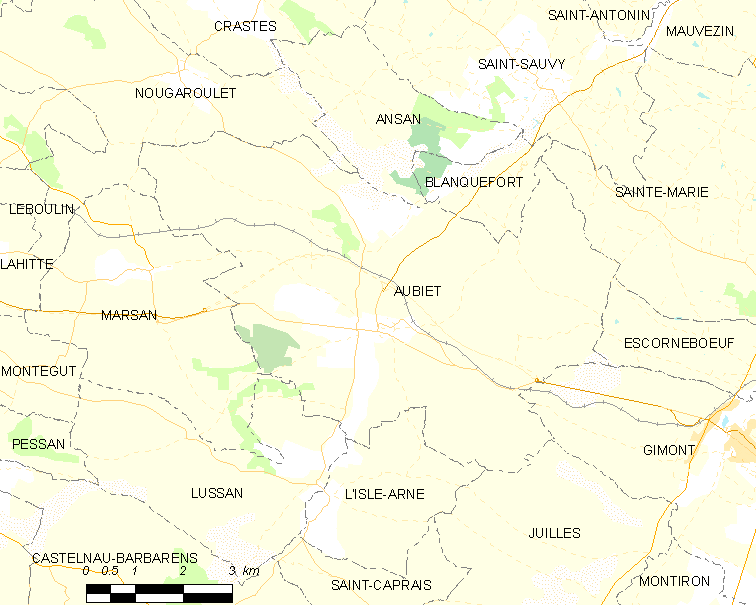
Aubiet and its surrounding communes

=== Roads and transports ===
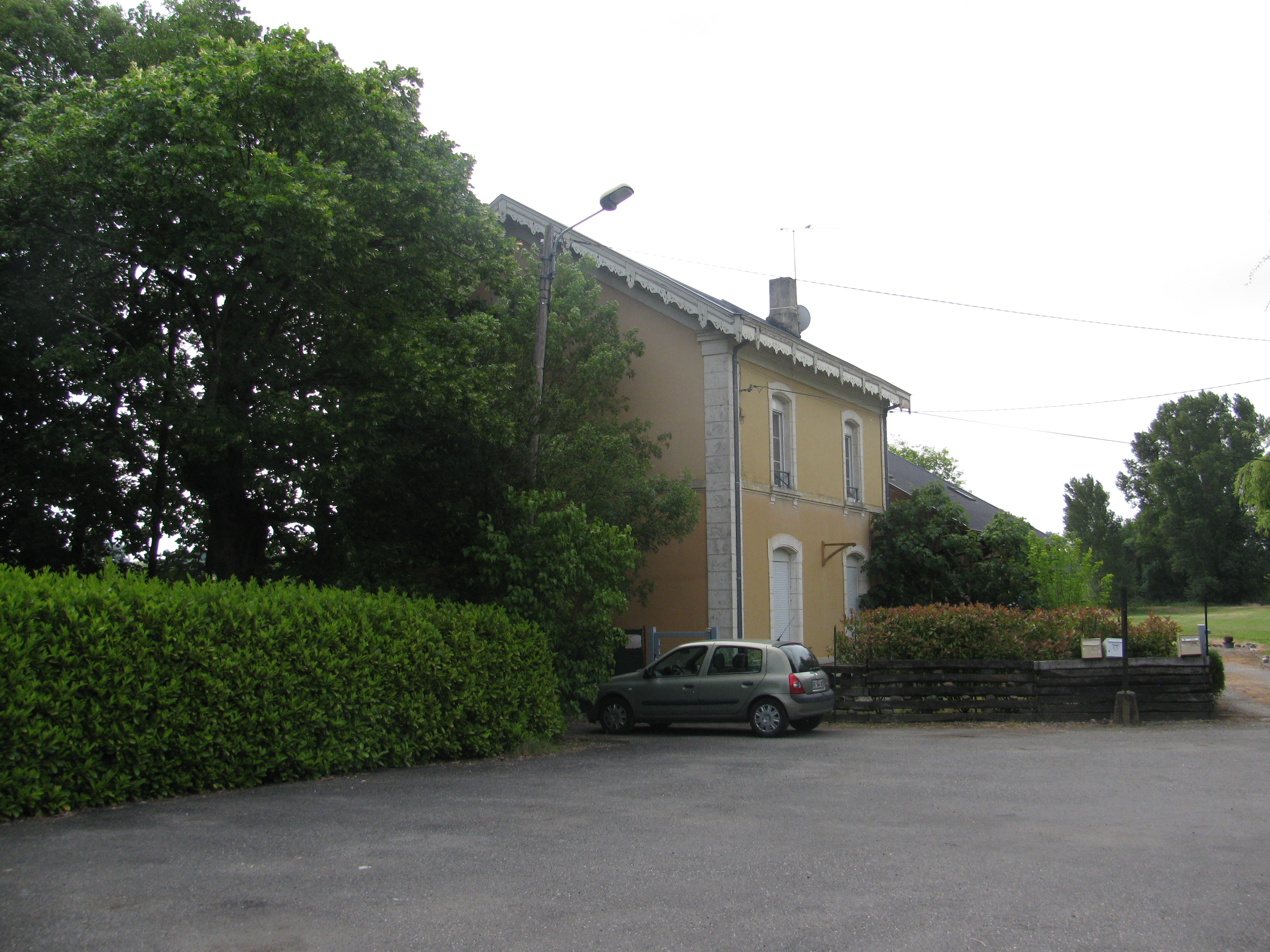
The train station in Aubiet

National road 124, which goes from Toulouse to Auch, passes by Aubiet.

Aubiet has a train station.

== Population ==
Historical population
Year	Pop.	±% p.a.
1968	971	—
1975	880	−1.40%
1982	911	+0.50%
1990	1,019	+1.41%
1999	1,001	−0.20%
2007	1,093	+1.11%
2012	1,142	+0.88%
2017	1,083	−1.06%
2023	1,134	+0.77%
Source: INSEE

== See also ==
- Communes of the Gers department
