= Blanquefort, Gers =

Blanquefort
- Commune
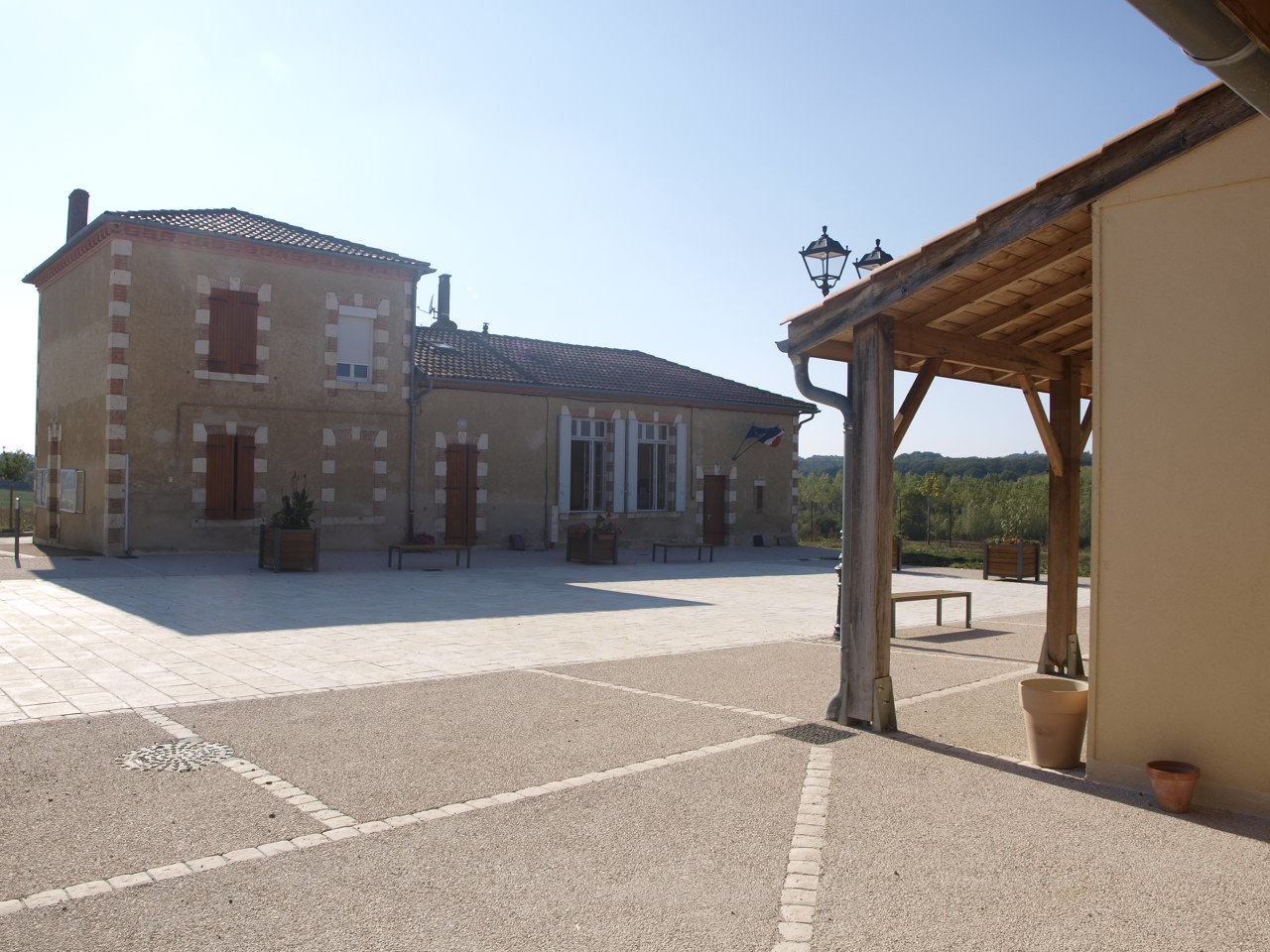
- Town hall
- Location of Blanquefort
- Location within France Location within Occitanie
- Coordinates: 43°40′32″N 0°48′34″E
- Country: France
- Region: Occitania
- Department: Gers
- Arrondissement: Auch
- Canton: Auch-2

Government
  - Mayor (2020–2026): Alain de Scorraille
- Area^{1}: 3.33 km^{2} (1.29 sq mi)
- Elevation: 150 m (490 ft)
- Highest elevation: 183 m (600 ft)
- Lowest elevation: 137 m (449 ft)
- Population (2023): 42
  - Density: 13/km^{2} (33/sq mi)
- Time zone: UTC+01:00 (CET)
  - Summer (DST): UTC+02:00 (CEST)
- INSEE/Postal code: 32056 /32270
- ^{1} French Land Register data, which excludes lakes, ponds, glaciers > 1 km^{2} (0.386 sq mi or 247 acres) and river estuaries.

Blanquefort (French pronunciation: [blɑ̃kfɔʁ]; Occitan: Blancafòrt) is a commune in the Gers department in southwestern France.

== Geography ==
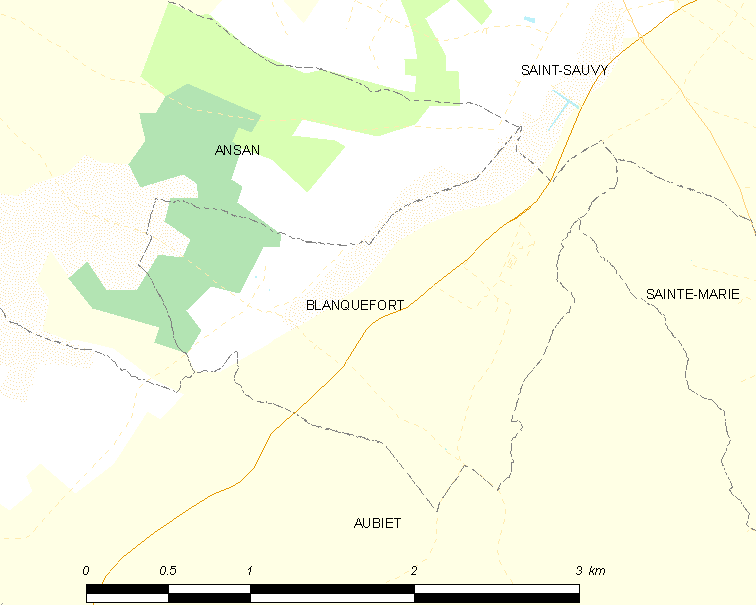
Blanquefort and its surrounding communes

== Population ==
Historical population
Year	Pop.	±% p.a.
1968	106	—
1975	82	−3.60%
1982	57	−5.06%
1990	44	−3.18%
1999	44	+0.00%
2007	73	+6.53%
2012	53	−6.20%
2017	57	+1.47%
2023	42	−4.96%
Source: INSEE

== See also ==
- Communes of the Gers department
