= Juilles =

- Commune
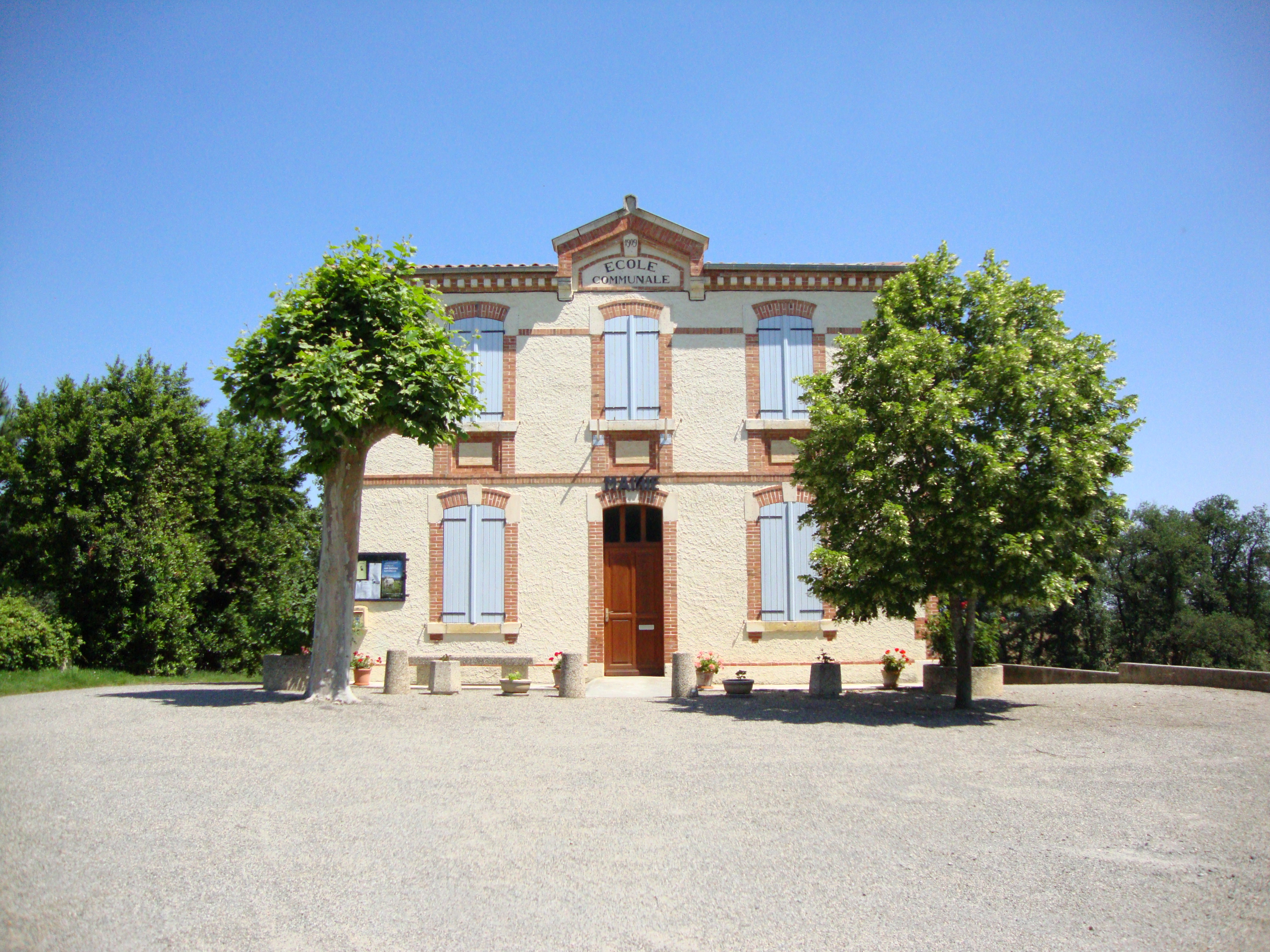
- Town hall and school
- Location of Juilles
- Location within France Location within Occitanie
- Coordinates: 43°36′08″N 0°49′51″E
- Country: France
- Region: Occitania
- Department: Gers
- Arrondissement: Auch
- Canton: Auch-2

Government
  - Mayor (2023–2026): Marie-Sylvie Roux
- Area^{1}: 13.86 km^{2} (5.35 sq mi)
- Elevation: 202 m (663 ft)
- Highest elevation: 234 m (768 ft)
- Lowest elevation: 145 m (476 ft)
- Population (2023): 227
  - Density: 16.4/km^{2} (42.4/sq mi)
- Time zone: UTC+01:00 (CET)
  - Summer (DST): UTC+02:00 (CEST)
- INSEE/Postal code: 32165 /32200
- ^{1} French Land Register data, which excludes lakes, ponds, glaciers > 1 km^{2} (0.386 sq mi or 247 acres) and river estuaries.

Juilles (French pronunciation: [ʒɥij]; Occitan: Julhas) is a commune in the Gers department in southwestern France. In 1947 the commune of Saint-Caprais was created from part of Juilles.

== Geography ==
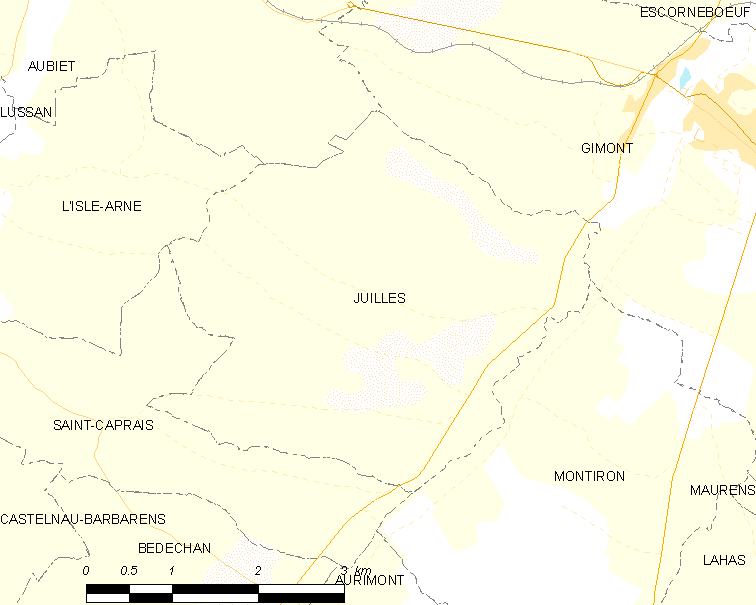
Juilles and its surrounding communes

== Population ==
Historical population
| Year | Pop. | ±% p.a. |
|---|---|---|
| 1968 | 193 | — |
| 1975 | 170 | −1.80% |
| 1982 | 182 | +0.98% |
| 1990 | 168 | −1.00% |
| 1999 | 181 | +0.83% |
| 2007 | 228 | +2.93% |
| 2012 | 227 | −0.09% |
| 2017 | 220 | −0.62% |
| 2023 | 227 | +0.52% |
Source: INSEE

== See also ==
- Communes of the Gers department
