= Montiron =

- Commune
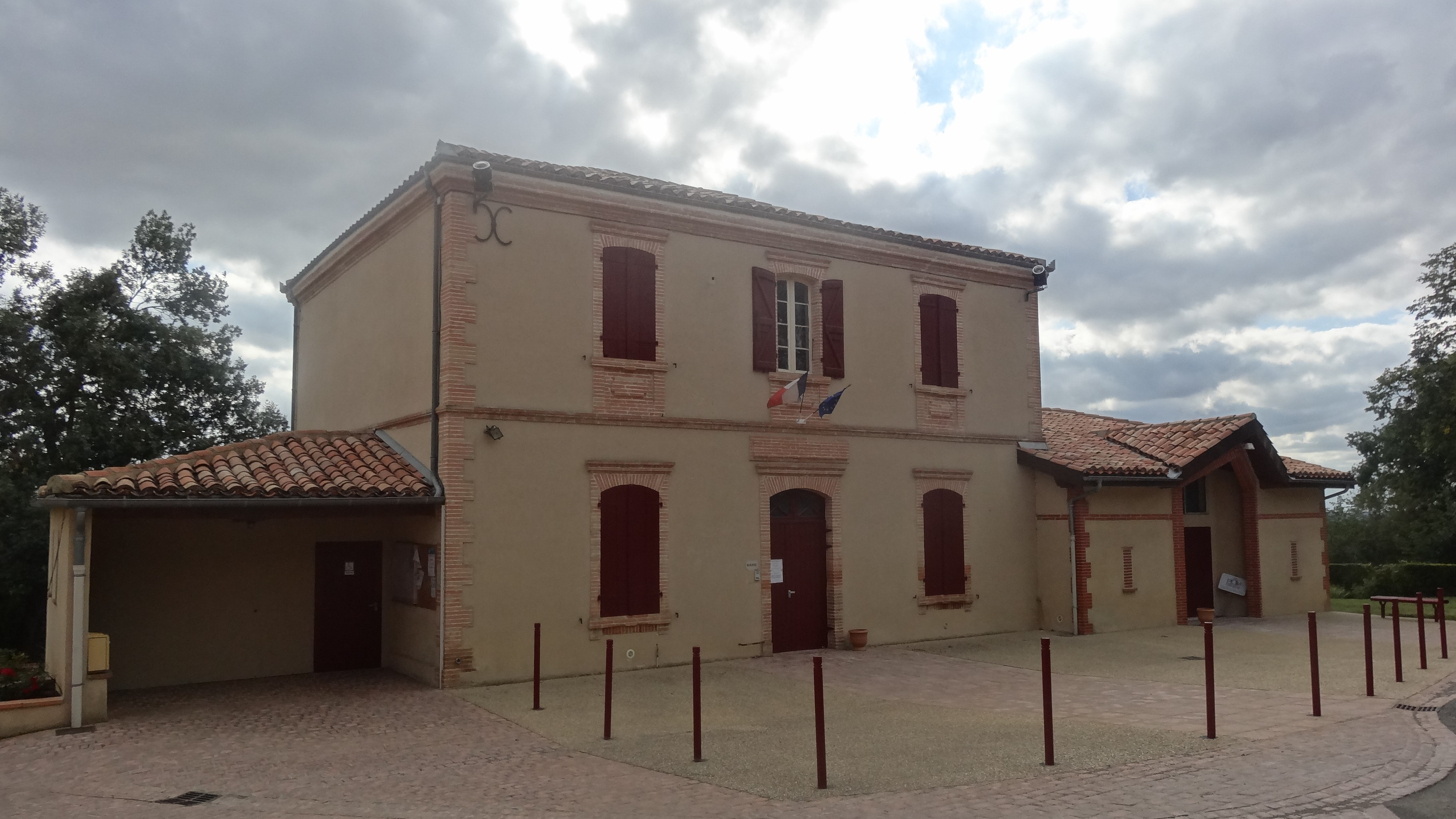
- The town hall in Montiron

- Coat of arms
- Location of Montiron
- Location within France Location within Occitanie
- Coordinates: 43°35′12″N 0°50′54″E
- Country: France
- Region: Occitania
- Department: Gers
- Arrondissement: Auch
- Canton: Auch-2

Government
  - Mayor (2020–2026): Jean-Michel Vernis
- Area^{1}: 10.54 km^{2} (4.07 sq mi)
- Elevation: 214 m (702 ft)
- Highest elevation: 253 m (830 ft)
- Lowest elevation: 146 m (479 ft)
- Population (2023): 137
  - Density: 13.0/km^{2} (33.7/sq mi)
- Time zone: UTC+01:00 (CET)
  - Summer (DST): UTC+02:00 (CEST)
- INSEE/Postal code: 32288 /32200
- ^{1} French Land Register data, which excludes lakes, ponds, glaciers > 1 km^{2} (0.386 sq mi or 247 acres) and river estuaries.

Montiron (French pronunciation: [mɔ̃tiʁɔ̃]) is a commune in the Gers department in southwestern France.

== Geography ==
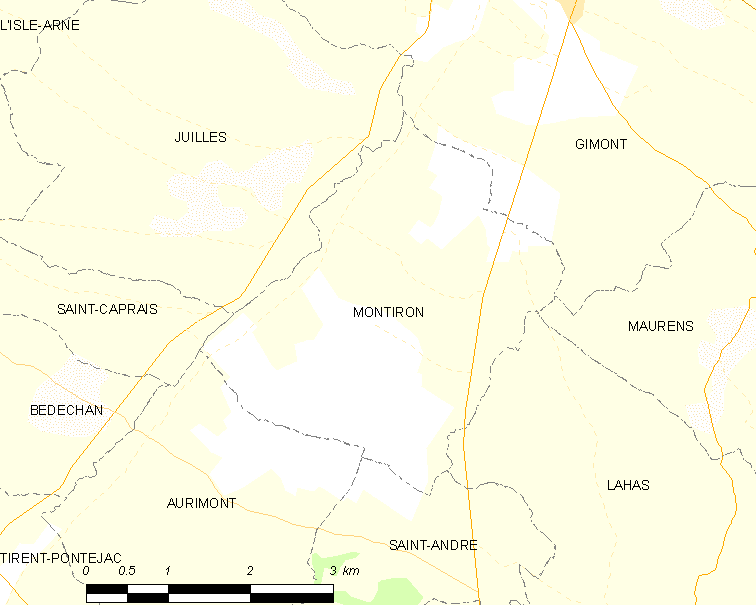
Montiron and its surrounding communes

== Population ==
Historical population
| Year | Pop. | ±% p.a. |
|---|---|---|
| 1968 | 154 | — |
| 1975 | 122 | −3.27% |
| 1982 | 110 | −1.47% |
| 1990 | 116 | +0.67% |
| 1999 | 131 | +1.36% |
| 2007 | 124 | −0.68% |
| 2012 | 125 | +0.16% |
| 2017 | 140 | +2.29% |
| 2023 | 137 | −0.36% |
Source: INSEE

== See also ==
- Communes of the Gers department
