= 2017 in the United Kingdom =

Events from the year 2017 in the United Kingdom. This year was the Sapphire Jubilee of Queen Elizabeth II.

== Incumbents ==
- Monarch – Elizabeth II
- Prime Minister – Theresa May (Conservative)

== Events ==
=== January ===
- 1 January – Kingston upon Hull begins its City of Culture programme.
- 2 January
  - Rail fares increase by an average of 2.3%, higher than inflation and continuing the trend in rising ticket prices.
  - The government announces proposals to build seventeen new towns and villages across the English countryside.
- 3 January – Sir Ivan Rogers resigns as UK's ambassador to the European Union.
- 4 January – Sir Tim Barrow is appointed as the UK's new ambassador to the European Union.
- 5 January
  - UK car sales are at a record high in 2016 according to the Society of Motor Manufacturers and Traders (SMMT), which says that 2,690,000 new cars were registered last year, 2% higher than in 2015.
  - The Royal Parks announces that the Changing of the Guard ceremony will be held on fixed days of the week (Mondays, Wednesdays, Fridays and Sundays) instead of alternate days for a three-month trial period owing to tightened security.
- 7 January – The British Red Cross describes the current situation in England's NHS hospitals as a "humanitarian crisis".
- 8 January – The Trades Union Congress announces that the average UK household owes £12,887 in debt.
- 9 January
  - A strike by workers on London Underground causes travel chaos and crowding in London, with much of the Tube network shut down.
  - Seven-year-old Katie Rough is fatally asphyxiated and stabbed in the neck near her home in York. A fifteen-year-old female hands herself in to the police immediately after the killing.
  - Northern Ireland's Deputy First Minister Martin McGuinness resigns.
- 11 January – The Royal College of Nursing describes conditions in the NHS as the worst they have ever experienced. In a separate move, fifty leading doctors write to the Prime Minister, warning that lives are being put at risk due to mounting pressures on the health service.
- 12 January
  - Plans for a 1.8-mile road tunnel on the A303 near Stonehenge in Wiltshire are finalised by the UK Government.
  - A government-commissioned review gives backing to a tidal lagoon planned for Swansea Bay in Wales. The £1,300,000,000 project could have a lifetime of 120 years and supply 8% of UK energy.
- 16 January – The power-sharing government of Northern Ireland collapses following the resignation of Martin McGuinness.
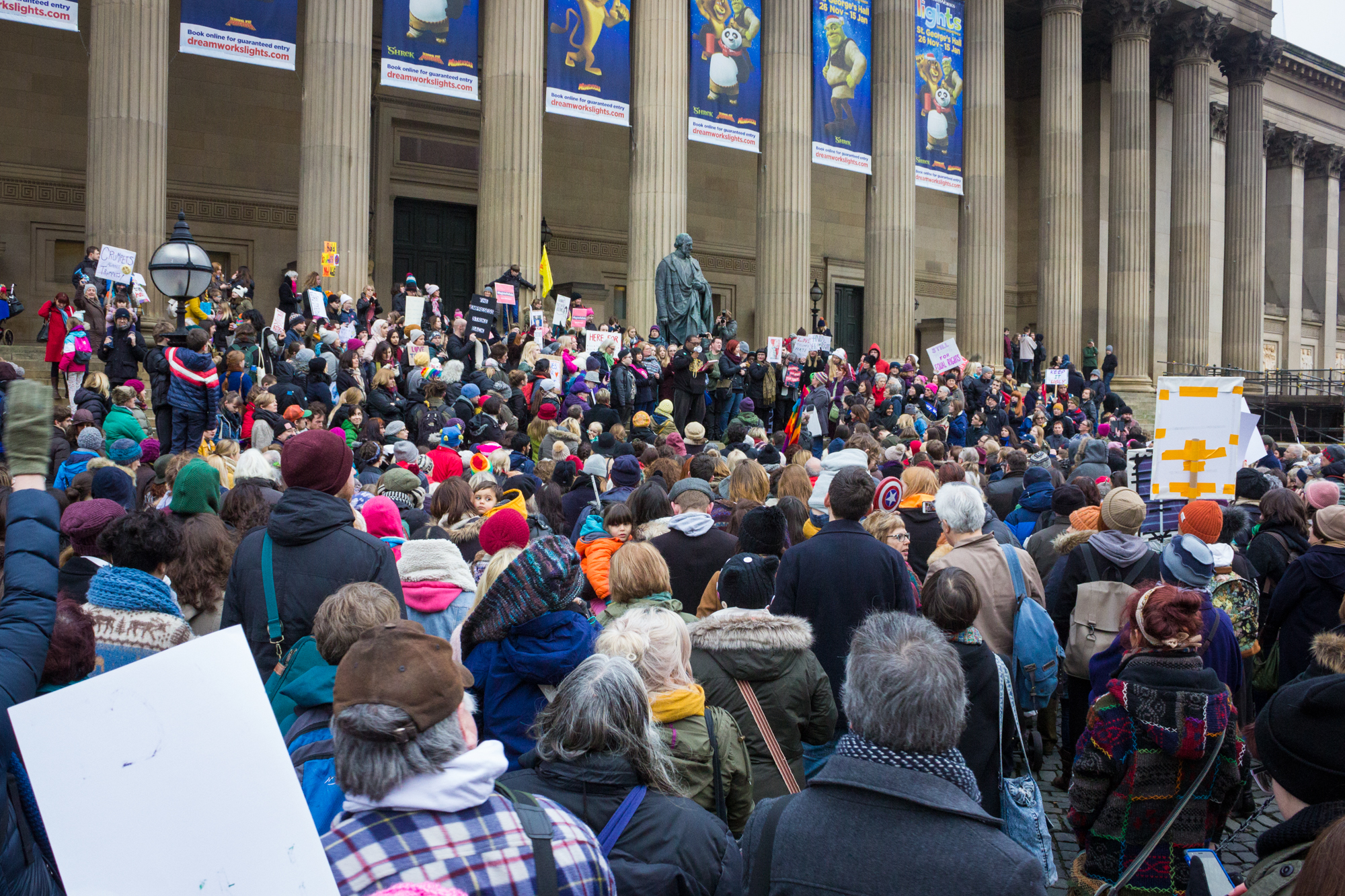
- Crowds at the Women's march in Liverpool
  21 January – 2017 Women's March: thousands of people march in London, Belfast, Cardiff, Lancaster, Leeds, Liverpool, Manchester, Shipley, Edinburgh and Bristol – as well as millions more in countries around the world – in protest at Donald Trump's inauguration as 45th President of the United States.
- 24 January – The UK Supreme Court rules against the Government's Brexit appeal case by an 8 to 3 decision, stating that Parliament must vote to trigger Article 50.
- 30 January – A petition to stop US President Donald Trump's UK state visit gathers more than 1.8 million signatures.

=== February ===
- 1 February – MPs back the European Union Bill by 498 votes to 114, with 47 Labour rebels voting against.
- 3 February – The government publishes a white paper setting out its Brexit plans.
- 6 February – The Queen commemorates her Sapphire Jubilee.
- 7 February – Plans for building more homes in England are revealed by the government, after ministers say that the housing market is "broken".
- 8 February
  - A political controversy involving Diane Abbott and David Davis emerges following the Article 50 vote.
  - Labour MP Clive Lewis resigns from the Shadow Cabinet in protest over his party's decision to whip its MPs into voting to trigger Article 50.
- 15 February – The European Commission issues a "final warning" to the United Kingdom over the breaching of air pollution limits.
- 18 February – Lincoln City F.C. become the first non-league team to reach the FA Cup quarter-finals for 103 years with a 1–0 victory over Burnley.
- 21 February – A heterosexual couple, Rebecca Steinfeld and Charles Keidan, lose their Court of Appeal case in which they sought to be granted civil partnership instead of a traditional marriage.
- 22 February – Cressida Dick is appointed Commissioner of the Metropolitan Police, becoming the first woman to hold the position in the force's 188-year history.
- 23 February
  - By-elections are held in Copeland and Stoke-on-Trent Central to fill vacancies arising from the resignation of sitting Labour MPs. Trudy Harrison wins the Copeland seat for the Conservative Party and Gareth Snell retains the Stoke-on-Trent Central seat for the Labour Party. Labour had held the Copeland seat since its creation, and the Conservative win is the first gain by a serving government in a by-election for 35 years.
  - Britain is hit by winds of up to 94 mph from Storm Doris, causing travel disruption and a number of casualties.

=== March ===
- 2 March – New elections to the Northern Ireland Assembly are held. The Democratic Unionist Party loses ten seats, while Sinn Féin loses one seat.
- 5 March – Tens of thousands of people including NHS employees, campaigners and union representatives march in London to protest against "yet more austerity" in the health service.
- 6 March – The British car manufacturer Vauxhall, along with its German sister firm, Opel, is sold by General Motors to Peugeot-Citroën of France as Groupe PSA agrees to a €2,200,000,000 (£1.9bn) deal to buy General Motors' European operations.
- 8 March
  - Philip Hammond delivers the March 2017 United Kingdom budget, his first as Chancellor of the Exchequer.
  - Lord Michael Heseltine is sacked from his role as a government adviser following his rebellion against the government on the Brexit Bill in the House of Lords the previous day.
- 9 March
  - The think tank Resolution Foundation assesses that the UK is in its worst decade for pay growth for 210 years.
  - The Bishop of Burnley, Philip North, turns down a promotion to the position of Bishop of Sheffield after objections to his views on ordaining women as priests.
- 10 March BT bows to demands by the telecoms regulator Ofcom to legally separate Openreach, which runs the UK's broadband infrastructure.
- 14 March
  - The British Parliament passes the Brexit bill, paving the way for the UK Government to trigger Article 50; so that the UK can formally withdraw from the European Union.
  - Transgender fell-runner Lauren Jeska is sentenced to 18 years imprisonment for the attempted murder of UK Athletics official Ralph Knibbs. Jeska had feared her records and ability to compete in women's events would be investigated due to the unfair advantage she had from being born male.
- 15 March – Chancellor of the Exchequer Philip Hammond is forced to make a U-turn on his commitment to raising National Insurance contributions for the self-employed after vast opposition from Conservative backbenchers.
- 16 March
  - The European Union (Notification of Withdrawal) Bill is given Royal Assent by HM The Queen, making it an Act of Parliament.
  - Theresa May formally rejects Scottish First Minister Nicola Sturgeon's second Scottish Independence Referendum timetable for Autumn 2018, or at least before Brexit negotiations are concluded.
- 17 March – It is announced that the previous Chancellor of the Exchequer George Osborne, is to become the editor of the London Evening Standard; prompting extensive criticism.
- 22 March – Four people die and at least forty others are injured in what is treated as a terrorist attack in London, when a car driver, later identified as Khalid Masood, ploughs through pedestrians on Westminster Bridge before stabbing PC Keith Palmer to death at the Palace of Westminster. Police later shoot Masood dead. In response, the Houses of Parliament are placed in lockdown for four hours, as is the London Eye and Whitehall, and the devolved Scottish Parliament suspends a debate on a second Scottish independence referendum.
- 28 March – The new twelve-sided £1 coin is released.
- 29 March – The United Kingdom invokes Article 50 of the Treaty on European Union, beginning the formal EU withdrawal process.

=== April ===
- 6 April – The number of fatalities in the Westminster attack increases to six as a Romanian woman, rescued after falling into the Thames but with serious injuries, dies in hospital.
- 18 April – Prime Minister Theresa May calls a snap general election for 8 June.
- 19 April – The House of Commons formally approves the calling of an early general election with the necessary two-thirds majority in a 522 to 13 vote.
- 21 April – Britain goes a full day without using coal power to generate electricity for the first time since the Industrial Revolution, according to the National Grid.
- 29 April – The UK's Anthony Joshua becomes WBA World Heavyweight Champion after beating Ukraine's Wladimir Klitschko at Wembley Stadium.

=== May ===
- 4 May
  - Buckingham Palace announces that the Duke of Edinburgh is to step down from carrying out royal engagements in the autumn.
  - Local government elections are held across England, Scotland and Wales. The Conservative Party makes significant gains at the expense of the Labour Party, gaining 500 seats and seizing control of 11 councils. UKIP loses all 145 seats they were defending. The Liberal Democrats lose 41 seats, despite their share of the vote increasing. Labour is pushed into third place by the Conservatives in Scotland, where the SNP is comfortably the largest party despite failing to take control of target councils. The Conservatives win four out of six metro-mayoral areas, including in the traditionally Labour-voting Tees Valley and West Midlands.
- 5 May
  - An unidentified male jogger pushes a woman in front of a bus on Putney Bridge.
  - Paper £5 notes featuring Elizabeth Fry cease to be legal tender in the UK.
- 12 May – Computers across the United Kingdom are hit by a large-scale ransomware cyber-attack, causing major disruption.
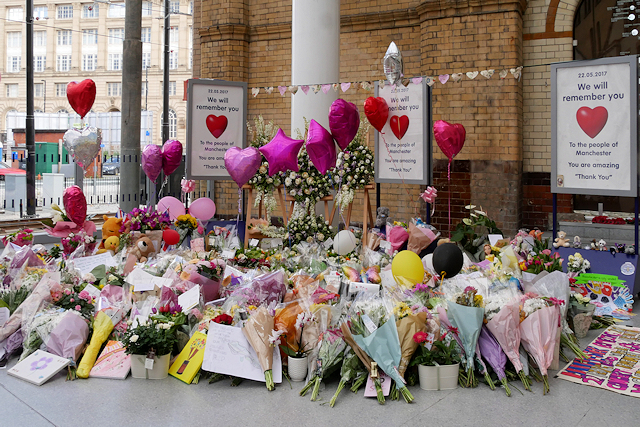
- Tributes to victims of the Manchester Arena Attack
  22 May – Manchester Arena is attacked by a suicide bomber following a music concert by American singer Ariana Grande, resulting in multiple casualties. It is the most deadly attack in the UK since the 7 July 2005 London bombings and the first in the North of England since the IRA bombing of Manchester in June 1996.
- 23 May – general election campaigning from all major political parties is temporarily suspended after the attack in Manchester.
- 24 May
  - The UK's terror threat level is raised from "severe" to "critical", its highest possible level, for the first time in ten years; meaning not only is an attack being highly likely, it is "expected imminently".
  - As police investigate a "network" relating to the Manchester Arena attack, up to 5,000 military personnel are deployed onto the streets of Britain. Seven people are arrested, including the bomber's 23-year-old brother. The suicide bomber is confirmed to have been 22-year-old Salman Abedi, who lived in the city and was the son of Libyan immigrants.
- 25 May – Police investigating the Manchester bombing reveal they have stopped sharing information with the US, following leaks to the media.
- 27 May
  - British Airways experiences a global IT system failure, causing severe disruption to flights worldwide.
  - In football, Arsenal beat Chelsea 2-1 to win the FA Cup for a record thirteenth time.

=== June ===
- 3 June
  - Seven people are reported killed and 48 injured in an attack by three Islamist extremists at London Bridge. A hit-and-run vehicle on the bridge is followed by knife attacks at Borough Market. All three perpetrators are shot dead by police within eight minutes.
  - Reynhard Sinaga, an Indonesian student living in Manchester is arrested on one count of rape. Later investigations reveal him to be a prolific rapist in British legal history, having poisoned and raped up to 200 men.
- 4 June – General election campaigning is suspended by most major political parties for a day following the previous evening's attack in London. Prime Minister Theresa May confirms the general election will go ahead as scheduled on 8 June.
- 7 June – Solar, wind and nuclear power each provide more electricity than gas and coal combined for the first time in the UK.
- 8 June – general election 2017: The Conservatives remain the largest party, but fail to get enough seats for a majority, leading to a hung parliament. In a surprise result, they are reduced from 330 to 318 seats. PM Theresa May rejects calls for her to resign and attempts to form a coalition with the DUP, which would give her 10 additional seats. Labour gain 32 seats, with particular success in London; the SNP suffers heavy losses with 21 fewer seats; the Liberal Democrats gain four seats for a total of 12; UKIP lose their sole seat and Paul Nuttall resigns as party leader.
- 10 June – 10 Downing Street issues a statement claiming the Democratic Unionist Party have agreed a confidence-and-supply deal to support a Conservative minority government. However, both parties subsequently confirm that talks about an agreement are still ongoing.
- 11 June – The England national under-20 football team win the FIFA U-20 World Cup for the first time beating Venezuela by 1 goal to nil in the final.
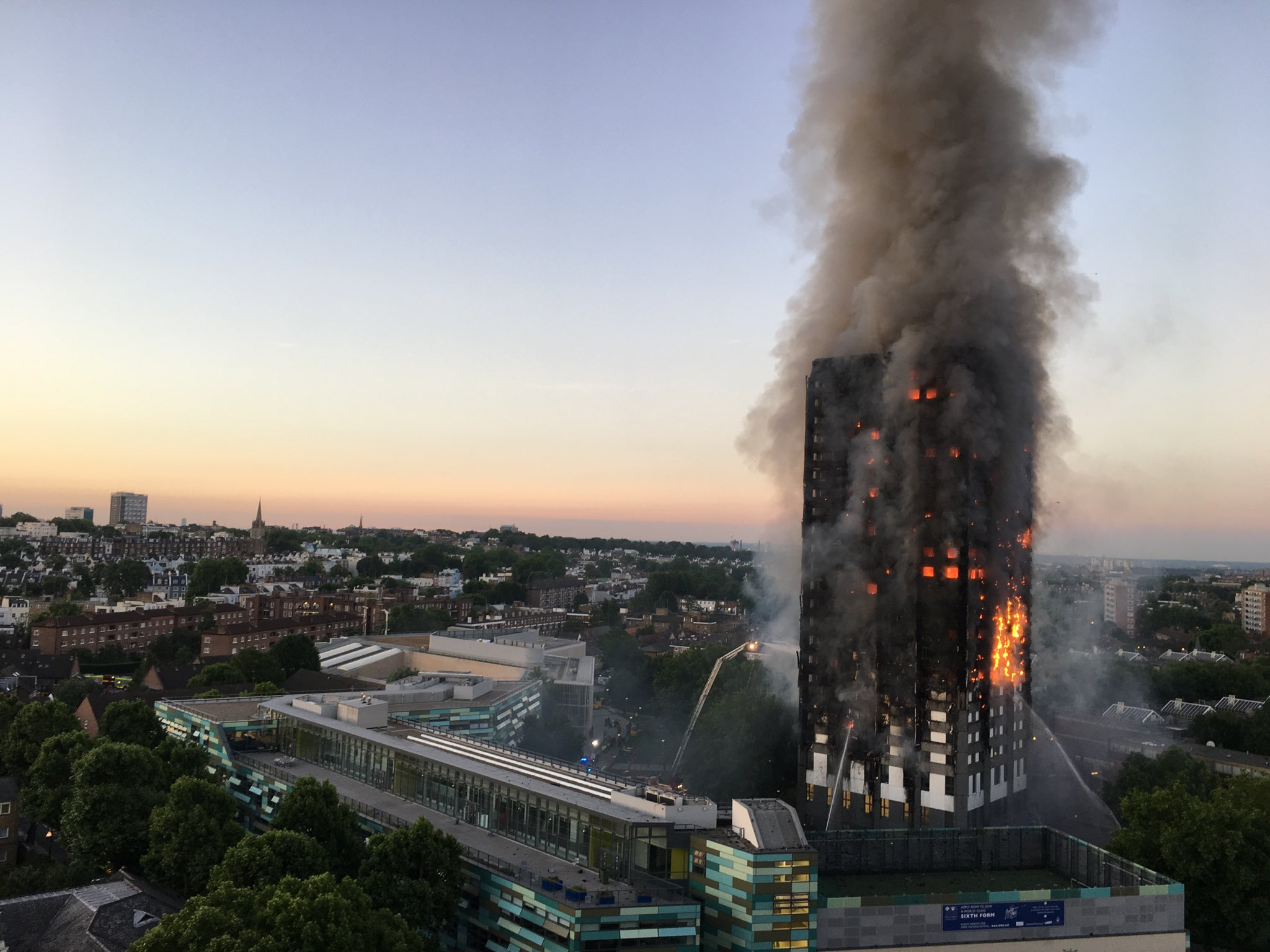
- Grenfell tower in flames
  14 June
  - A major fire engulfs Grenfell Tower in West London, with 71 fatalities eventually officially confirmed (16 November) and more than 70 people taken to hospital.
  - Tim Farron resigns as leader of the Liberal Democrats.
- 18 June – The Government announces that there will be no Queen's Speech in 2018, to give MPs more time to deal with Brexit laws.
- 19 June
  - 2017 Finsbury Park attack: One person is killed and ten others are injured after a van is deliberately rammed into pedestrians near Finsbury Park Mosque. 47-year-old Darren Osborne, who shouted that he wanted to "kill all Muslims", is arrested after members of the public subdue him.
  - Brexit Secretary David Davis heads to Brussels as formal negotiations with the EU get underway.
- 21 June
  - As the heatwave continues, the UK experiences its hottest June day since 1976, with a temperature of 34.4C (94F) recorded at Heathrow Airport.
  - Matthew Falder, a post-doctoral researcher at the University of Birmingham, is arrested at his place of work and later charged with 137 offences relating to blackmail and voyeurism. He is sentenced to 32 years in prison, later reduced to 25 years on appeal.
- 24 June – Police investigate a cyberattack on the Houses of Parliament after an attempt was made to gain unauthorised access to politicians' email accounts.
- 26 June – The Conservatives agree a £1 billion deal with Northern Ireland's Democratic Unionist Party to support Theresa May's Conservative minority government.
- 27 June – Nicola Sturgeon announces that she will delay plans for a proposed second Scottish independence referendum.
- 30 June – The leader of Kensington and Chelsea council, Nick Paget-Brown, resigns following criticism over the Grenfell Tower fire enquiry.

=== July ===
- 1 July – Thousands of people march in London in the "Not One Day More" protest against the government's economic policies.
- 3 July – French energy supplier EDF raises the estimated cost of completing the new Hinkley Point C nuclear plant from £18 billion to £19.6 billion.
- 9 July – The Lake District becomes an officially recognised UNESCO World Heritage Site.
- 11 July – The government announces more than £100 million of investment in the UK's space sector.
- 12 July – A gay man, John Walker, wins a landmark ruling at the Supreme Court, giving his husband the same pension rights as a wife would receive.
- 16 July – Lewis Hamilton wins a fifth British Grand Prix, and fifth career grand slam. His fourth back-to-back win at his home race. Additionally, equaling Alain Prost and Jim Clark with 5 British Grand Prix wins.
- 18 July – Gains in life expectancy in England are reported to have slowed to a halt, after more than 100 years of continuous progress.
- 19 July – The government announces that a rise in the State Pension age to 68 will be phased in between 2037 and 2039, rather than from 2044 as was originally planned. This will affect 6 million men and women currently aged between 39 and 47 years old.
- 20 July
  - Sir Vince Cable becomes the new leader of the Liberal Democrats after nominations close without any challengers.
  - The Office for National Statistics reports that crime in England and Wales has seen its largest annual rise in a decade, increasing by 10% overall between April 2016 and March 2017, with violent crime up by 18%.
- 22 July
  - The Government announces plans to introduce drone registration and safety awareness courses for owners of the small unmanned aircraft.
  - The UK Independence Party loses overall control of Thanet District Council, the only local authority it runs, after one of its councillors defects to the Conservative Party.
- 26 July
  - The government announces that all new diesel and petrol cars and vans will be banned in the UK from 2040.
  - The Supreme Court rules that employment tribunal fees are unlawful, meaning the government will have to repay up to £32m to claimants.

=== August ===
- 2 August – The Duke of Edinburgh carries out his final official engagement before retiring from public duties at age 96.
- 4 August – The World Athletic Championships start at the Queen Elizabeth Olympic Park in London.
- 6 August – In a repeat of the FA Cup Final in May, Arsenal beat Chelsea on penalties following a 1–1 draw to win the 2017 FA Community Shield. All proceeds are donated to victims of the Grenfell Tower fire.
- 10 August – A trade analysis by the Environmental Investigations Agency shows that the UK is the world's largest legal ivory exporter.
- 16 August – The Royal Navy's new £3bn aircraft carrier, HMS Queen Elizabeth, arrives in her home port of Portsmouth for the first time.
- 21 August – The chimes of Big Ben fall silent as a four-year renovation of the building begins.

=== September ===
- 1 September – Women are eligible to join the RAF Regiment, making the Royal Air Force the first of the British armed services to accept both genders in all roles.
- 4 September – A survey by the National Centre for Social Research finds that, for the first time, a majority (53%) of adults in the UK describe themselves as non-religious.
- 11 September – In a Commons vote, MPs back the EU Withdrawal Bill by 326 to 290, as critics warn it represents a "power grab" by ministers.
- 14 September – A new £10 polymer banknote is released, featuring Jane Austen.
- 15 September – Parsons Green train bombing: A blast and fire on a District line train at Parsons Green station in London is treated as a terrorist attack. A number of people suffer burn injuries, while others are injured during the trample to escape. There are 29 injures in total, but no deaths and no reports of any life-threatening injuries. The UK terror threat is raised to its highest level as police hunt the perpetrator, who is arrested the following day at the Port of Dover.
- 20 September – UK scientists edit the DNA of human embryos for the first time.
- 22 September
  - Transport for London (TfL) announces that Uber is "not fit and proper" to operate in London and will not have its licence renewed.
  - The UK's credit rating is downgraded by Moody's, from Aa1 to Aa2.
- 27 September – Measles is declared eradicated in the UK.

=== October ===
- 2 October – Monarch Airlines, the UK's fifth biggest airline, is placed into administration.
- 3 October – Following a spate of acid attacks, the government announces that sales of acids to under 18s will be banned.
- 15 October – Round £1 coins cease to be legal tender in the UK.
- 5 October – The England national football team qualifies for the 2018 FIFA World Cup after defeating Slovenia 1–0 at Wembley Stadium.
- 16 October
  - Revised figures from the ONS indicate that Britain is £490 billion poorer than previously thought, and that the country no longer has a net reserve of foreign assets.
  - Hurricane Ophelia hits the British Isles.
- 17 October – The Consumer Price Index (CPI), the UK's key inflation rate, increases from 2.9 to 3%, its highest for more than five years, driven by a rise in transport and food prices.
- 26 October – Women in Scotland are to be allowed to take abortion pills at home, bringing the country into line with others such as Sweden and France.
- 28 October – The England national under-17 football team win the FIFA U-17 World Cup for the first time after beating Spain by 5 goals to 2 in the final.

=== November ===
- 1 November
  - Defence Secretary Sir Michael Fallon resigns following allegations of inappropriate past behaviour.
  - The Government loses an opposition vote calling on it to publish impact assessments of Brexit on more than 50 key industries.
- 2 November
  - Gavin Williamson replaces Michael Fallon as defence secretary.
  - The Bank of England raises interest rates for the first time in 10 years, from 0.25 to 0.5%.
- 5 November – A huge new leak of documents known as the Paradise Papers is reported by the BBC's Panorama programme, revealing how the wealthy and powerful, including the Queen's private estate, invest offshore.
- 7 November – Nicola Sturgeon, Scotland's First Minister, apologises to gay men convicted of sexual offences that are no longer illegal as new legislation is introduced that will automatically pardon gay and bisexual men convicted under historical laws.
- 13 November – David Davis announces that Parliament will be given a vote on the final Brexit deal before the United Kingdom leaves the European Union in 2019.
- 15 November – A report by the British Medical Journal shows that NHS and social care austerity has been responsible for 120,000 excess deaths since 2010 under the Tories.
- 16 November – The Metropolitan Police announces that 71 victims of the Grenfell Tower fire have been formally identified and that all those who died have been recovered.
- 17 November
  - Sarah Clarke, current championship director of the All England Lawn Tennis Club, is appointed as the first female Black Rod. She will take up the position in January 2018, and have the title "The Lady Usher of the Black Rod".
- 18 November
  - Richard Leonard is elected as the new Scottish Labour leader after Kezia Dugdale resigned from the role in August.
  - Gerry Adams announces his intention to stand down as Sinn Féin president in 2018.
- 20 November
  - The Queen and Prince Philip celebrate their 70th wedding anniversary.
  - In the wake of Britain's decision to leave the EU, it is announced that the European Banking Authority will be moved from London to Paris, while the European Medicines Agency will be moved from London to Amsterdam.
- 21 November – The UK loses its seat on the International Court of Justice for the first time since the UN's principal legal body began in 1946.
- 22 November – Chancellor Phillip Hammond delivers the November 2017 budget.
- 23 November
  - The European Commission states that UK participation in the European Capital of Culture will no longer be possible.
  - Closure of last iron foundry in Coalbrookdale, Shropshire.
- 24 November – A sixteen-year-old girl who admitted killing seven-year-old Katie Rough in York is detained for life and ordered to serve a minimum term of five years.
- 26 November – Sailors of the Royal Navy perform the Changing of the Guard ceremony in London for the first time in its history.

=== December ===
- 3 December – Alan Milburn and the entire Social Mobility Commission quit their roles, citing ‘lack of political leadership’, a repeated refusal to properly resource and staff the commission, an obsession with Brexit and an ‘absence’ of policy.
- 7 December – Coventry is named the UK City of Culture 2021.
- 8 December – The United Kingdom and European Union reach agreement on the first stage of Brexit.
- 11 December – Mount Hope in the British Antarctic Territory is found to be the highest mountain in British territory.
- 12 December – The UK's key inflation rate – the consumer prices index – rises to 3.1%, the highest level in nearly six years.
- 13 December – After a rebellion by Tory MPs, the government is defeated in a key vote on Brexit, with MPs voting in favour of giving Parliament a say on the final deal struck with the EU.
- 14 December – The Scottish government's budget proposes splitting the 20% income tax band into three with a new lower band of 19%, a 20% band, and a 21% band for those earning over £24,000.
- 20 December – The EU announces that the UK's Brexit transition period will end no later than 31 December 2020.

== Publications ==
- Stephen Baxter's science fiction novel The Massacre of Mankind.
- Simon Beckett's crime novel The Restless Dead.
- Jack Copeland et al.'s book on the life and work of Alan Turing, The Turing Guide.
- William Dalrymple and Anita Anand's history of the Koh-i-Noor Koh-i-Noor: The History of the World's Most Infamous Diamond.
- Lindsey Davis' historical novel The Third Nero.
- Helen Dunmore's poetry collection Inside the Wave, posthumous winner of Book of the Year in the 2017 Costa Book Awards.
- Paula Hawkins' novel Into the Water.
- John le Carré's novel A Legacy of Spies.
- Robert Macfarlane and Jackie Morris' children's poetry book The Lost Words.
- Jon McGregor's novel Reservoir 13
- Anna McQuinn's picture book Lulu Gets a Cat
- Jamie Oliver's recipe book 5 Ingredients – Quick and Easy Food.
- Philip Pullman's fantasy novel La Belle Sauvage, first part of The Book of Dust.
- Will Self's novel Phone.
- J. R. R. Tolkien's high fantasy The Tale of Beren and Lúthien, edited posthumously by Christopher Tolkien, the author's son.

== Births ==
- 17 March – Constitution Hill, National Hunt racehorse

== Deaths ==
=== January ===
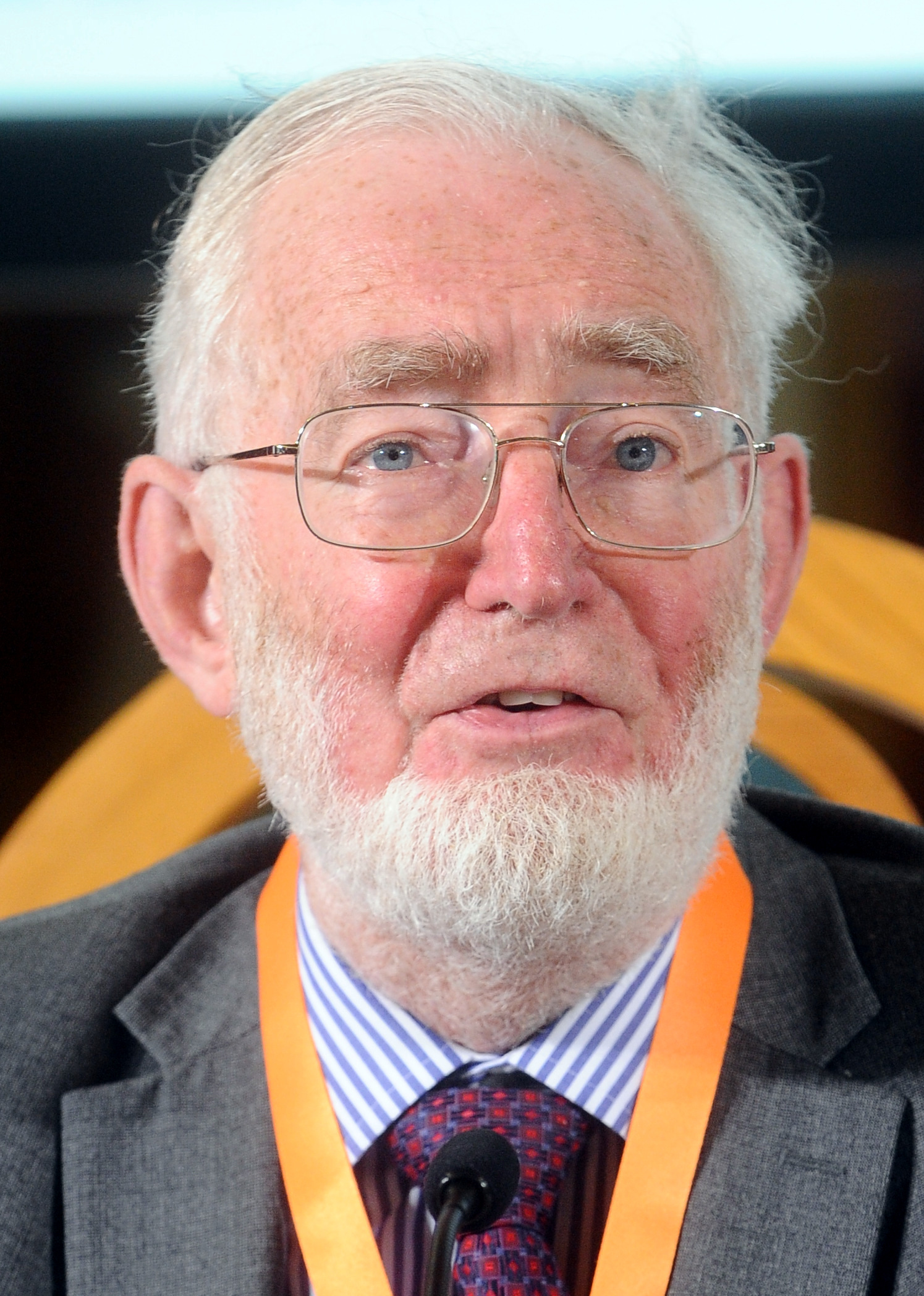
Sir Tony Atkinson

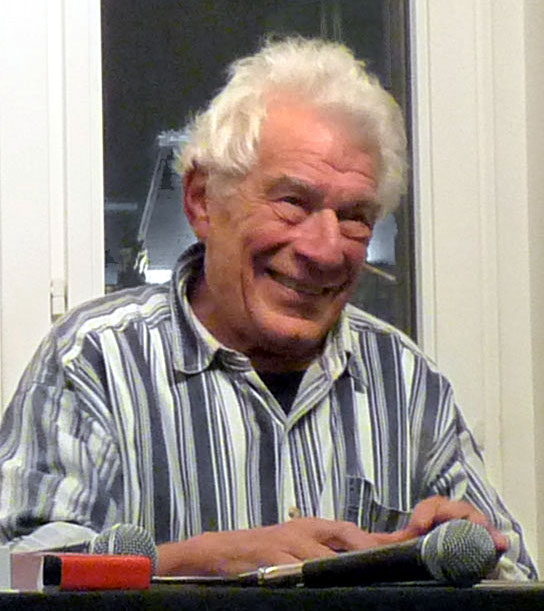
John Berger

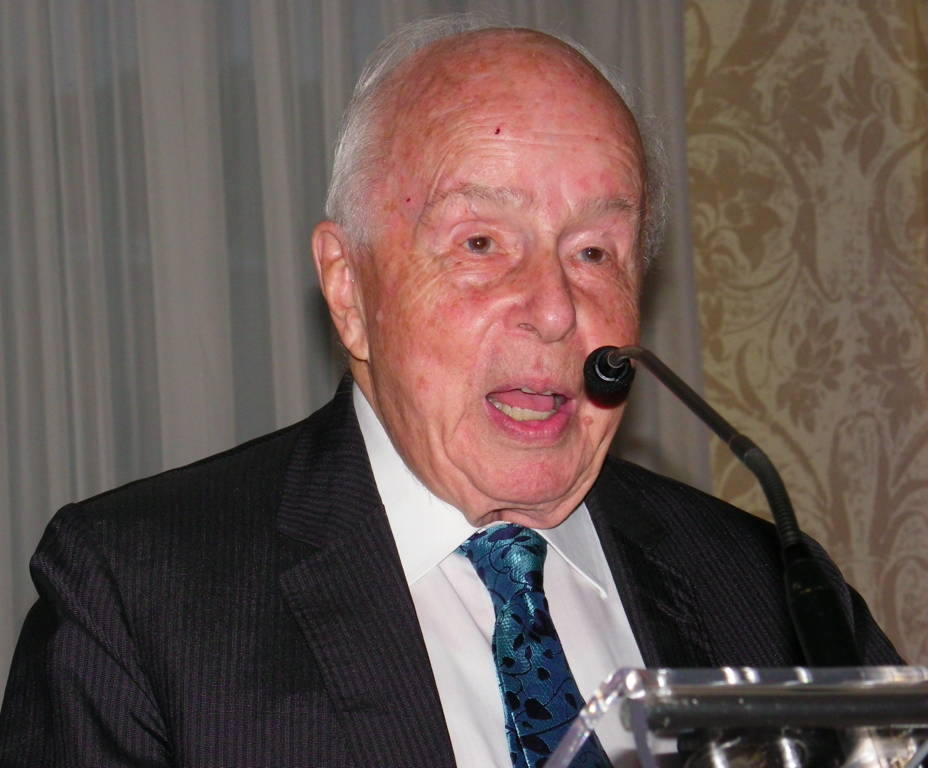
Rolf Noskwith

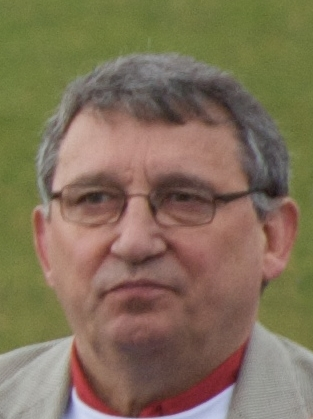
Graham Taylor

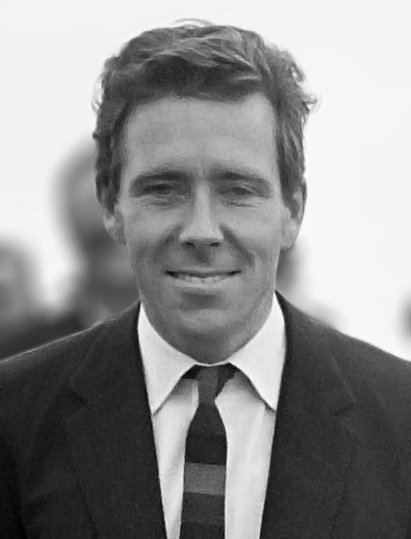
Antony Armstrong-Jones, 1st Earl of Snowdon

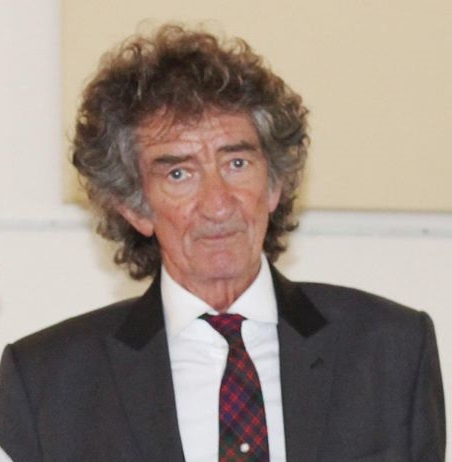
Mike Kellie

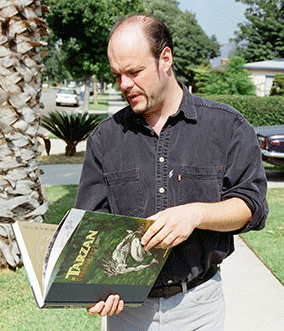
John Watkiss

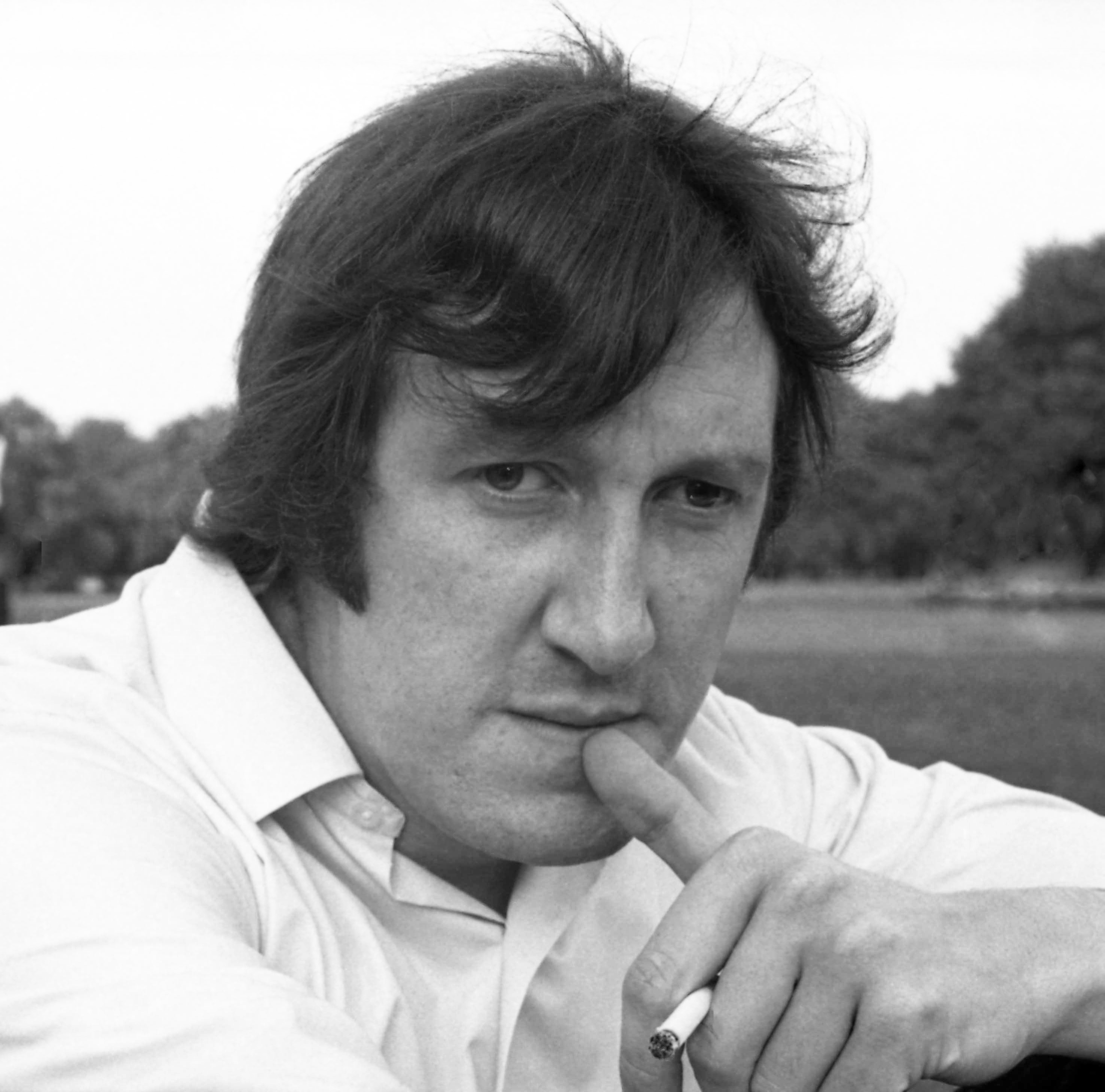
Gorden Kaye

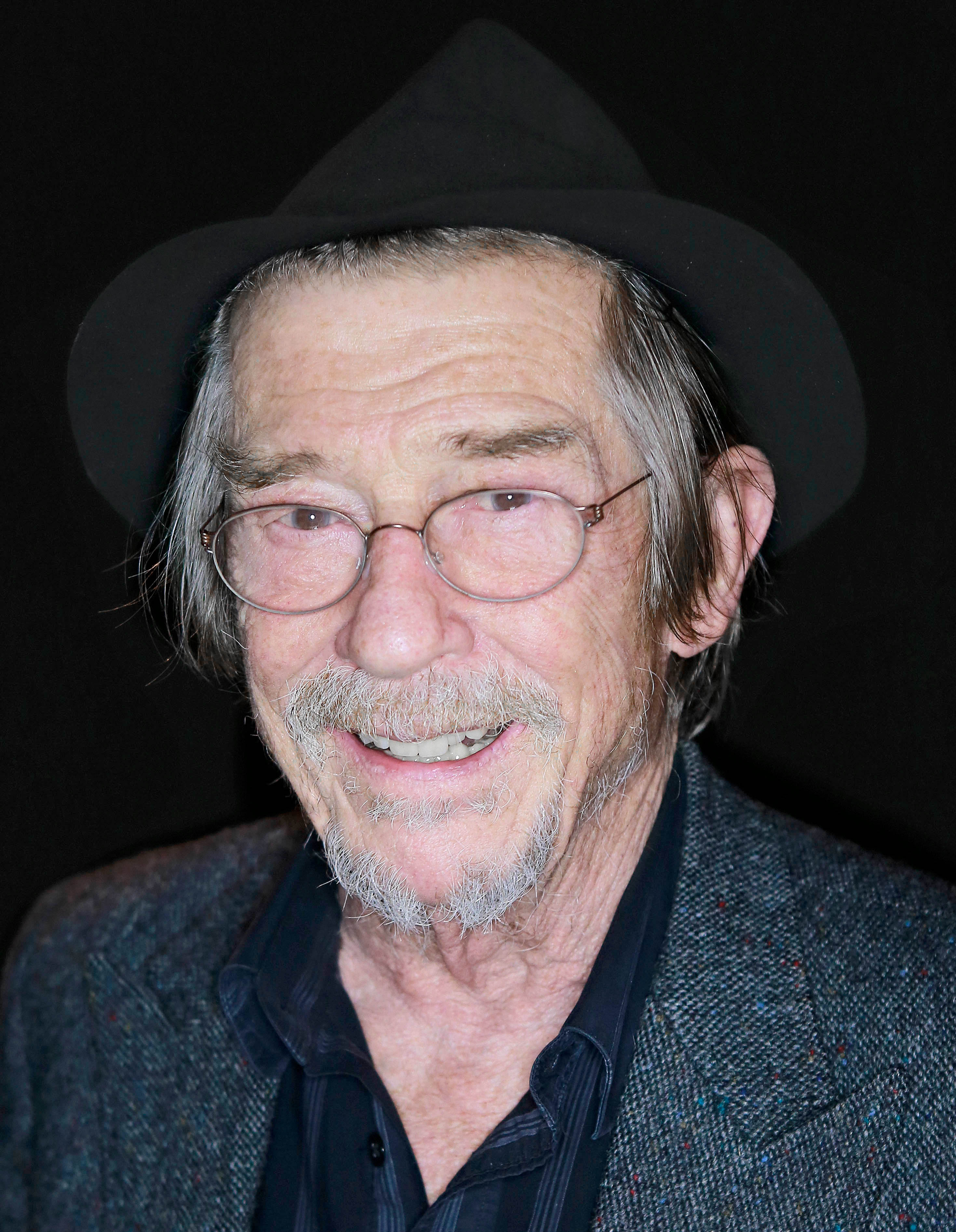
Sir John Hurt

- 1 January
  - Sir Tony Atkinson, 72, economist.
  - Peter Farmer, 75–76, set designer.
  - George Miller, 87, cricketer (Scotland).
  - Derek Parfit, 74, philosopher (Reasons and Persons).
  - Sir Jeremy Reilly, 82, Army general.
- 2 January
  - John Berger, 90, painter and art critic.
  - Ian Davison, 79, cricketer (Nottinghamshire).
  - Brian Widlake, 85, journalist and broadcaster (The Money Programme).
- 3 January
  - Rodney Bennett, 81, television director (Doctor Who).
  - Rolf Noskwith, 97, businessman and codebreaker during World War II.
- 4 January
  - John Cummings, 73, politician, MP for Easington (1987–2010).
  - Sandra Landy, 78, bridge player.
  - Sir Douglas Wass, 93, civil servant, Permanent Secretary to HM Treasury (1974–1983).
  - Paul Went, 67, footballer (Charlton Athletic, Fulham, Leyton Orient, Portsmouth).
- 5 January
  - David Alexander, 90, Royal Marines general.
  - Graham Atkinson, 73, footballer (Oxford United).
  - Jill Saward, 51, campaigner and rape survivor.
  - Harry Taylor, 81, footballer (Newcastle United).
  - Peter Weston, 72, science fiction fanzine editor.
- 6 January
  - John Hubbard, 85, artist.
  - Una Kroll, 91, nun and Anglican priest.
- 7 January – Mike Ovey, 58, clergyman and academic administrator (Oak Hill College).
- 8 January
  - Rod Mason, 76, jazz trumpeter.
  - Peter Sarstedt, 75, singer ("Where Do You Go To (My Lovely)?")
  - Colin Shortis, 82, Army general.
  - Nigel Spearing, 86, politician, MP for Acton (1970–1974) and Newham South (1974–1997).
  - Laurie Topp, 93, footballer (Hendon).
- 9 January
  - Zygmunt Bauman, 91, sociologist.
  - Terry Ramshaw, 74, rugby league footballer (Featherstone Rovers, Wakefield Trinity).
- 10 January
  - Ronald Buxton, 93, politician, MP for Leyton (1965–1966).
  - William Goodhart, Baron Goodhart, 83, lawyer and politician.
  - Clare Hollingworth, 105, journalist (The Daily Telegraph), broke news of German invasion of Poland (1939).
- 11 January
  - Tony Booth, 83, poster artist (The Beatles).
  - James Ferguson-Lees, 88, ornithologist (British Birds).
  - Brian Fletcher, 69, jockey (Grand National winner).
  - Katherine Fryer, 106, artist.
  - Charles Lyell, 3rd Baron Lyell, 77, peer.
  - Kenyon Wright, 84, Scottish Episcopal priest and political campaigner.
- 12 January
  - Robin Hyman, 85, publisher.
  - Anthony King, 82, professor and political scientist.
  - Larry Steinbachek, 56, keyboardist (Bronski Beat).
  - Graham Taylor, 72, football manager (Watford, Aston Villa, England).
- 13 January
  - Antony Armstrong-Jones, 1st Earl of Snowdon, 86, photographer, filmmaker and former husband of Princess Margaret.
  - Mark Fisher, 48, writer, cultural theorist and music journalist (The Wire, Fact).
  - Sir John Hanson, 78, diplomat and historian.
  - John Jacobs, 91, golfer, founder of the PGA European Tour.
- 15 January
  - Babette Cole, 66, children's author.
  - Terry Cryer, 82, jazz and blues photographer.
- 16 January – Brian Whitehouse, 81, footballer (West Bromwich Albion, Crystal Palace).
- 17 January – Philip Bond, 82, actor (Doctor Who, The Onedin Line).
- 18 January
  - Hilary Bailey, 79, writer.
  - Rachael Heyhoe Flint, Baroness Heyhoe Flint, 77, cricketer (England women's team), businesswoman and philanthropist.
  - Peter Kippax, 76, cricketer (Yorkshire, Durham, Northumberland).
  - Johnny Little, 86, footballer (Rangers, Morton, Scotland).
- 19 January
  - Roderick Ham, 91, architect.
  - Mike Kellie, 69, multi-instrumentalist (Spooky Tooth, The Only Ones) and record producer.
- 20 January – Emma Tennant, 79, author.
- 21 January
  - Shirley Paget, Marchioness of Anglesey, 92, writer.
  - Dave Shipperley, 64, footballer (Charlton Athletic, Gillingham).
  - John Watkiss, 55, comic artist (Deadman) and concept artist (Tarzan, Atlantis: The Lost Empire).
- 22 January
  - Katharine Macmillan, Viscountess Macmillan of Ovenden, 96, politician and aristocrat.
  - Pete Overend Watts, 69, bass guitarist (Mott the Hoople).
- 23 January
  - Gorden Kaye, 75, comic actor ('Allo 'Allo!, Brazil, Coronation Street).
  - Douglas Reeman, 92, author.
  - Betty Tebbs, 98, women's rights activist.
- 25 January
  - Sir John Hurt, 77, actor (Alien, The Elephant Man, Hellboy, Harry Potter), BAFTA winner (1979, 1981).
  - Mike Peyton, 96, cartoonist.
  - Sir Nigel Rodley, 75, lawyer, professor and human rights pioneer.
  - Margaret Wall, Baroness Wall of New Barnet, 75, trade unionist and peer.
- 26 January
  - Tam Dalyell, 84, politician, MP for West Lothian (1962–1983) and Linlithgow (1983–2005).
  - David Rose, 92, television producer (Z-Cars) and founder of FilmFour.
- 27 January
  - Geoffrey Raisman, 72, neuroscientist.
  - David Sayer, 80, cricketer (Kent).
  - Billy Simpson, 87, footballer (Linfield, Rangers).
- 28 January
  - Sir Christopher Bland, 78, businessman and Chairman of the BBC (1996–2001).
  - Alexander Chancellor, 77, journalist (The Guardian, The Spectator, The Oldie).
  - Many Clouds, 9, racehorse.
  - Geoff Nicholls, 68, keyboardist (Black Sabbath, Quartz).
- 29 January – Sir Harold Atcherley, 98, businessman and arts administrator.
- 31 January
  - Deke Leonard, 72, rock guitarist (Man).
  - John Schroeder, 82, composer, songwriter and record producer (Helen Shapiro, Sounds Orchestral, Status Quo).
  - John Wetton, 67, singer-songwriter ("Only Time Will Tell", "Heat of the Moment") and bass guitarist (Asia, King Crimson).

=== February ===
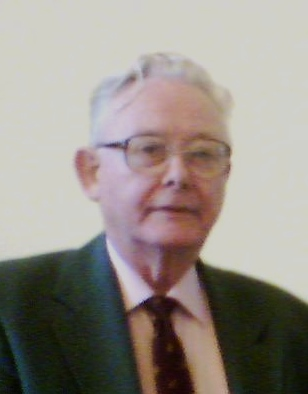
Sir Peter Mansfield

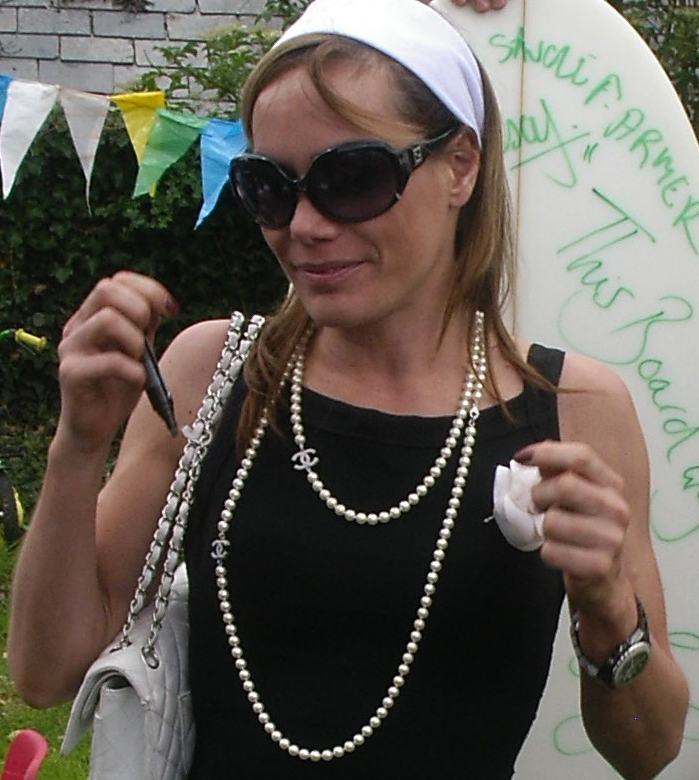
Tara Palmer-Tomkinson

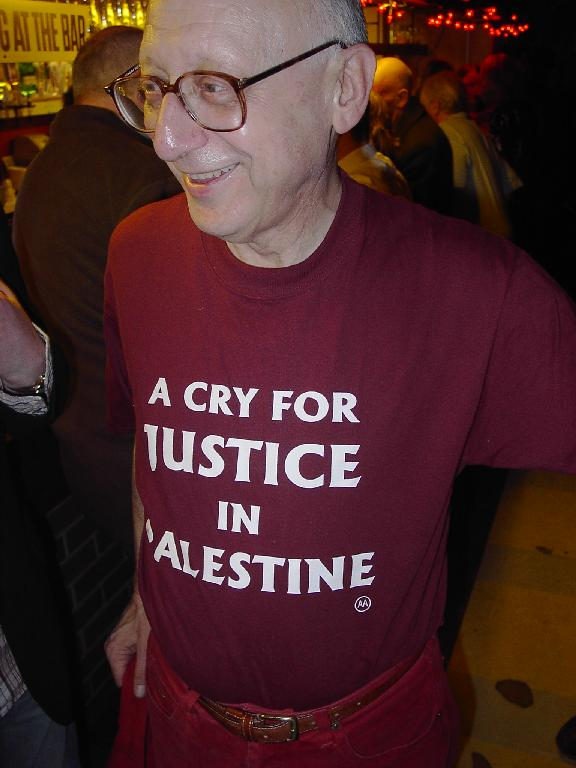
Sir Gerald Kaufman

- 1 February
  - Desmond Carrington, 90, actor (Emergency – Ward 10) and broadcaster.
  - Ken Morrison, 85, businessman and president of the Morrisons supermarket chain.
- 3 February
  - Gordon Aikman, 31, ALS campaigner.
  - Anthony French, 96, physicist, contributor to the Manhattan Project.
  - Colin Hutton, 90, rugby league player, manager and executive (Hull).
  - Michael Whinney, 86, Anglican prelate, Bishop of Aston (1982–1985) and Bishop of Southwell (1985–1988).
- 4 February
  - Gervase de Peyer, 90, clarinetist.
  - Ivor Noël Hume, 89, archaeologist (Wolstenholme Towne).
  - Sir Kenneth Newman, 90, police officer, Commissioner of the Metropolitan Police (1982–1987).
- 5 February – Glen Dudbridge, 78–79, sinologist.
- 6 February – Alec McCowen, 91, actor (A Night to Remember, Frenzy, Gangs of New York).
- 7 February
  - Michael Henshall, 88, Anglican prelate, Bishop of Warrington (1976–1996).
  - John Salt, 75, Anglican bishop, Diocese of St Helena (1999–2011).
- 8 February
  - Timothy Behrens, 79, painter.
  - Sir Elihu Lauterpacht, 88, lawyer.
  - Sir Peter Mansfield, 83, physicist, laureate of the Nobel Prize in Physiology or Medicine (2003).
  - Tara Palmer-Tomkinson, 45, socialite and television presenter.
  - Tom Raworth, 78, poet.
  - Alan Simpson, 87, comedy scriptwriter (Hancock's Half Hour, Comedy Playhouse, Steptoe and Son).
  - Sir John Wells, 91, politician, MP for Maidstone (1959–1987).
- 9 February – Simon Porter, 66, cricketer and cricket administrator (Oxfordshire).
- 11 February – Joseph Bonnar, 68, rugby league footballer of the 1960s and 1970s.
- 12 February
  - Sara Coward, 69, actress (The Archers).
  - Damian, 52, pop singer.
  - Bobby Murdoch, 81, footballer (Liverpool).
- 15 February – Roy Proverbs, 84, footballer (Gillingham).
- 16 February
  - Richard Pankhurst, 89, academic and son of Sylvia Pankhurst.
  - Peter Richardson, 85, cricketer (Worcestershire, Kent, England).
- 17 February
  - Alan Aldridge, 73, graphic designer (The Who, Elton John).
  - Peter Skellern, 69, singer-songwriter.
- 18 February – Roger Hynd, 75, footballer (Rangers, Birmingham City) and football manager (Motherwell).
- 19 February – Don Dixon, Baron Dixon, 87, politician, MP for Jarrow (1979–1997).
- 20 February
  - Steve Hewlett, 58, journalist (The Guardian) and radio presenter (The Media Show).
  - Leo Murphy, 78, Gaelic footballer.
- 21 February
  - Sir Cosmo Haskard, 100, colonial administrator, Governor of the Falkland Islands (1964–1970).
  - Sir Michael Palmer, 88, Army officer, Defence Services Secretary (1982–1985).
  - Garel Rhys, 76, economist and motor industry academic.
- 23 February
  - Derek Ibbotson, 84, runner, Olympic bronze medalist (1956).
  - David Waddington, Baron Waddington, 87, politician, MP (1968–1974, 1979–1990), Home Secretary (1989–1990), Leader of the House of Lords (1990–1992) and Governor of Bermuda (1992–1997).
- 25 February
  - Neil Fingleton, 36, actor (Game of Thrones, 47 Ronin, Doctor Who) and basketball player.
  - Bobby Lumley, 84, footballer (Hartlepool United, Charlton Athletic).
  - Elli Norkett, 20, rugby player (Wales).
  - Lloyd Williams, 83, rugby union player (Cardiff, Wales).
- 26 February
  - Sir Gerald Kaufman, 86, politician, MP for Manchester Ardwick (1970–1983) and Manchester Gorton (since 1983), Father of the House (since 2015).
  - Irvine Sellar, 82, property developer and architect (The Shard).
- 27 February
  - Syd Lowdon, 81, rugby league footballer (Whitehaven, Workington Town, Cumberland).
  - Alex Young, 80, footballer (Hearts, Everton, Scotland).
- 28 February
  - Douglas Milmine, 95, Anglican prelate, Bishop of Paraguay (1973–1985).
  - Nicholas Mosley, 93, novelist and biographer.
  - James Walker, 76, actor (Nineteen Eighty-Four, Empire of the Sun).

=== March ===
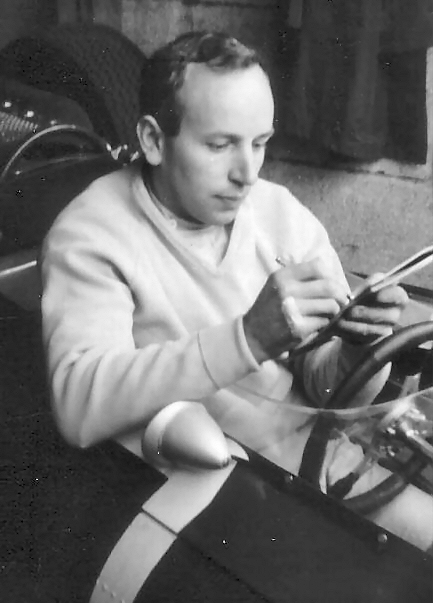
John Surtees

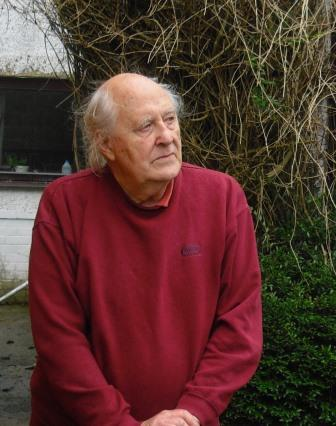
Roy Fisher

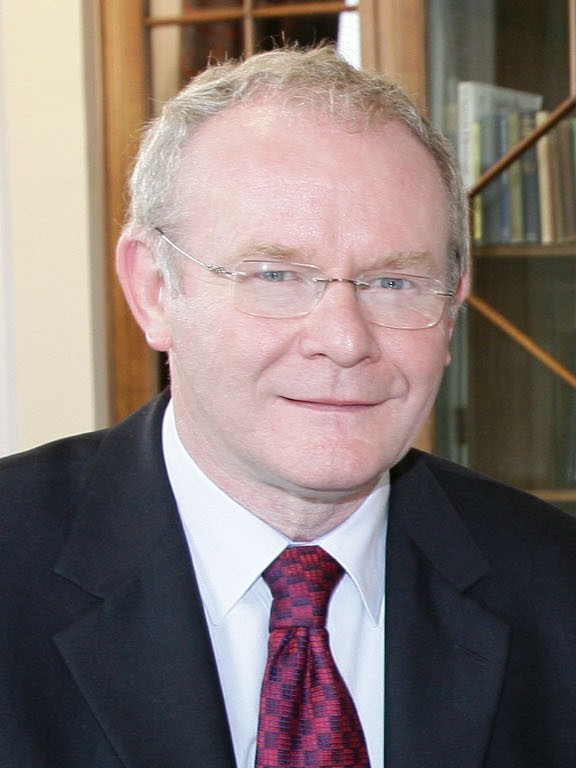
Martin McGuinness

- 1 March
  - P. J. Bradley, 76, politician, member of the Northern Ireland Assembly (1998–2011).
  - John Hampshire, 76, cricketer (Yorkshire, England).
- 2 March – Tommy Gemmell, 73, footballer (Celtic, Dundee, Scotland) and manager.
- 3 March
  - Dame Anne Griffiths, 84, librarian and archivist.
  - Mary Parry, 87, figure skater, European championship bronze medalist (1960).
  - Gordon Thomas, 84, journalist and author.
- 5 March – Leonard Manasseh, 100, architect.
- 6 March – Geoffrey Wainwright, 79, archaeologist.
- 7 March
  - Ronald Drever, 85, physicist.
  - Julian Haines, 72–73, bowler.
- 8 March – Sir Clive Bossom, 99, baronet, politician and MP for Leominster (1959–1974).
- 9 March
  - Mick Adams, 65, rugby league footballer (Widnes Vikings).
  - Ann Beach, 78, actress (Fresh Fields).
  - Jane Freeman, 81, actress (Last of the Summer Wine).
  - Howard Hodgkin, 84, painter and printmaker.
  - Keith Holliday, 82, rugby league footballer (Wakefield Trinity).
- 10 March
  - Sir Nigel Cecil, 91, Royal Navy officer, Lieutenant Governor of the Isle of Man (1980–1985).
  - John Forgeham, 75, actor (The Italian Job, Sheena, Footballers' Wives).
  - Tony Haygarth, 72, actor (Chicken Run, Emmerdale, Dracula).
  - Glyn Tegai Hughes, 94, academic and politician.
  - Roy Mason, 83, figure skater, European championship bronze medalist (1960).
  - John Surtees, 83, motorcycle racer, world champion (1956, 1958, 1959, 1960) and Formula One driver, world champion (1964).
- 12 March
  - Pamela Sue Anderson, 61, philosopher.
  - Ray Hassall, 74, politician, Lord Mayor of Birmingham (2015–2016).
- 13 March
  - Chris Greetham, 80, cricketer (Somerset).
  - John Lever, 55, drummer (The Chameleons).
  - Dave Taylor, 76, footballer (Yeovil Town).
- 14 March
  - Barbara Boxall, women's magazine editor.
  - Jim McAnearney, 81, footballer (Sheffield Wednesday, Plymouth Argyle) and manager.
- 15 March – Stephen Cosh, 97, cricketer.
- 16 March
  - Tony Barrow, 45, rugby league player (Swinton Lions).
  - Henry Richmond, 81, Anglican prelate, Bishop of Repton (1986–1998).
- 17 March
  - Robert Day, 94, television and movie director (The Green Man, First Man into Space, The Rebel).
  - George Lewith, 67, medical researcher.
- 19 March
  - Robin Sibson, 72, mathematician, vice-chancellor of the University of Kent, chief executive of the Higher Education Statistics Agency.
  - Ian Stewart, 87, racing driver.
- 20 March – Billy Hails, 82, professional footballer and manager (Peterborough United).
- 21 March
  - Colin Dexter, 86, author (Inspector Morse series).
  - Roy Fisher, 86, poet and jazz pianist.
  - Martin McGuinness, 66, politician, deputy First Minister of Northern Ireland (2007–2017), MP (1997–2013), MLA (1998–2017) and former Provisional Irish Republican Army (IRA) leader.
- 22 March
  - Andy Coogan, 99, author and World War II veteran.
  - Ken Currie, 91, footballer (Heart of Midlothian, Dunfermline Athletic).
  - John Derrick, 54, cricketer (Glamorgan).
  - Keith Palmer, 47–48, police officer, victim of the 2017 Westminster attack.
  - Ronnie Moran, 83, football player and coach (Liverpool).
- 24 March
  - Piers Dixon, 88, politician, MP for Truro (1970–1974).
  - Peter Shotton, 75, washboardist (The Quarrymen) and businessman (Fatty Arbuckle's, Apple Corps).
  - Keith Sutton, 82, Anglican prelate, Bishop of Lichfield (1984–2003).
- 25 March – J. Richard Hill, 88, Royal Navy admiral.
- 27 March
  - Clem Curtis, 76, singer (The Foundations).
  - David Storey, 83, novelist (Saville), screenwriter (This Sporting Life) and playwright (Home).
  - Harold Neville Vazeille Temperley, 102, applied mathematician.
- 28 March
  - Paul Bowles, 59, footballer (Crewe Alexandra, Port Vale, Stockport County).
  - Gwilym Prys Davies, Baron Prys-Davies, 93, lawyer and politician.
- 30 March – Sir John Fretwell, 86, diplomat, Ambassador to France (1982–1987).
- 31 March
  - Rupert Cornwell, 71, journalist (The Independent).
  - Mike Hall, 35, endurance cyclist.
  - John Phillips, 65, footballer (Chelsea, Wales).

=== April ===
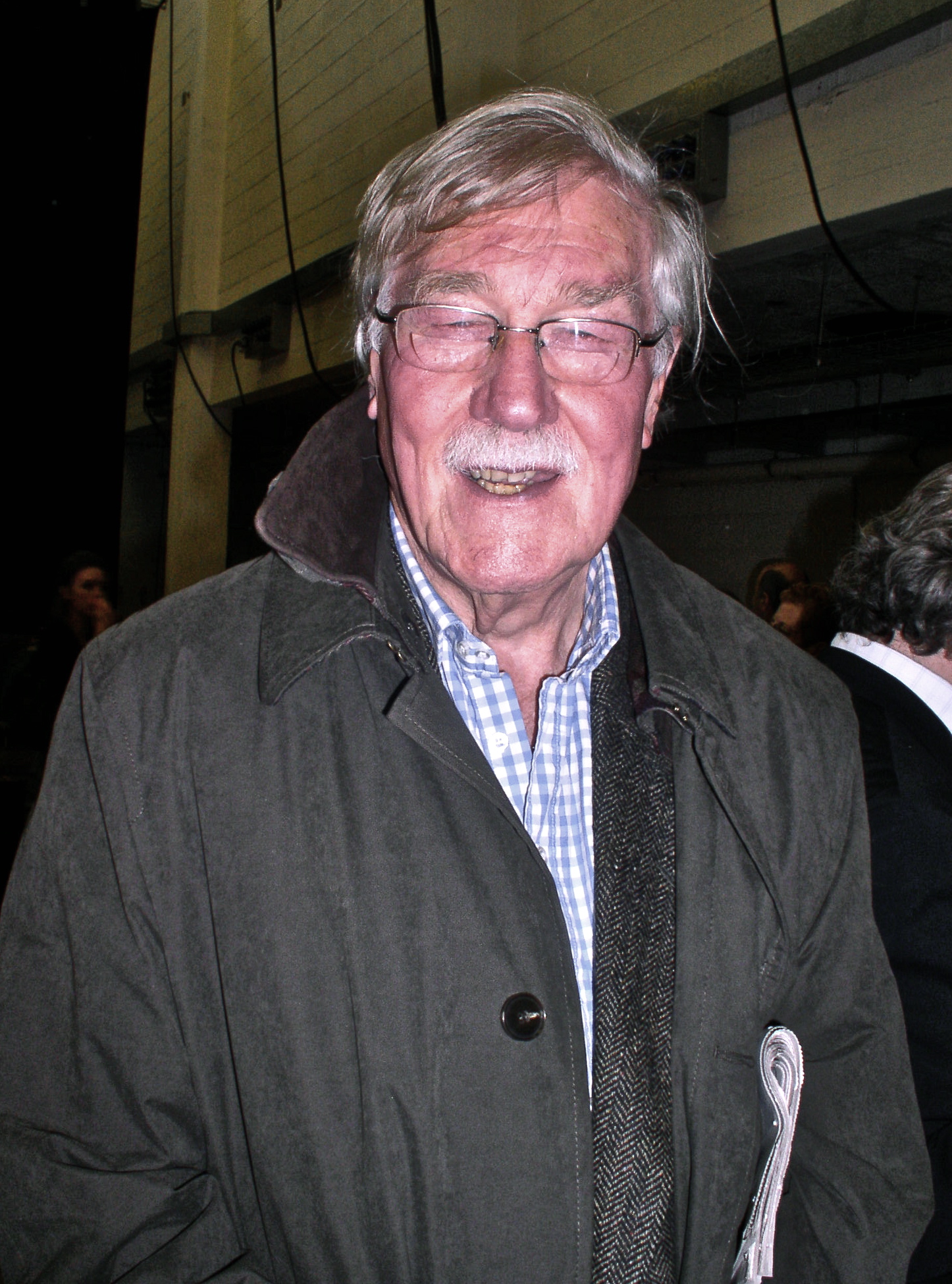
Christopher Morahan

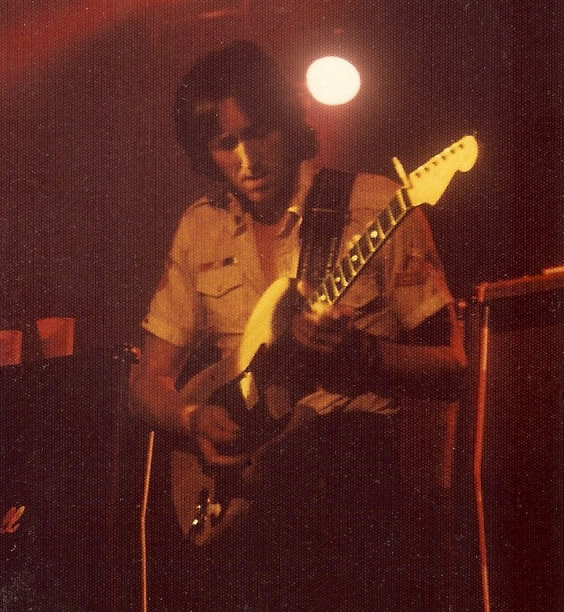
Allan Holdsworth

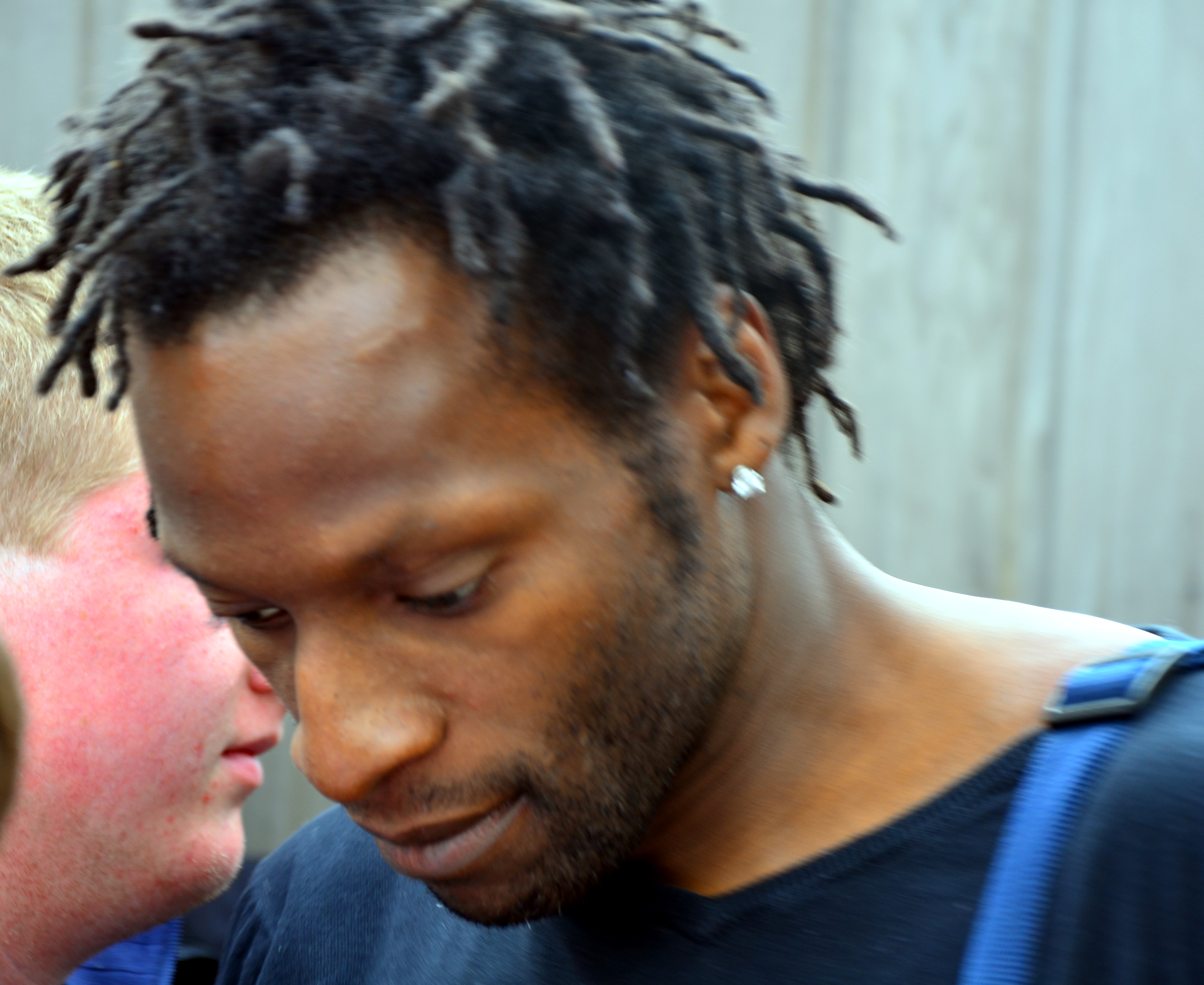
Ugo Ehiogu

- 1 April
  - Parv Bancil, 50, playwright.
  - Darcus Howe, 74, Trinidadian-born civil rights activist, member of the Mangrove Nine.
  - Stuart Markland, 69, footballer (Berwick Rangers, Dundee United, Montrose).
- 2 April
  - D. B. H. Wildish, 102, Royal Navy vice admiral.
  - Jeremy Wilson, 72, editor, publisher and writer.
- 3 April – Stella Turk, 92, zoologist, naturalist and conservationist.
- 5 April
  - Tim Parnell, 84, racing driver (Formula One).
  - Dennis Shaw, 86, cricketer (Warwickshire).
- 6 April
  - Stan Anslow, 85, footballer (Millwall).
  - John Fraser, 82, politician, MP for Norwood (1966–1997).
- 7 April
  - Christopher Morahan, 87, stage and television director (The Jewel in the Crown).
  - Mary Mumford, 15th Lady Herries of Terregles, 76, peeress.
  - Tim Pigott-Smith, 70, actor (The Jewel in the Crown, Clash of the Titans, V for Vendetta).
  - John Salmon, 86, advertising executive.
- 8 April – Brian Matthew, 88, TV and radio presenter (Saturday Club, Thank Your Lucky Stars, Sounds of the 60s).
- 9 April – Stan Robinson, 80, jazz tenor saxophonist and flautist.
- 10 April
  - Sir Arnold Clark, 89, businessman, founder of Arnold Clark Automobiles.
  - Fred Furniss, 94, footballer (Sheffield United).
  - David Parry-Jones, 83, TV presenter and writer.
  - Margaret Towner, 96, actress (Derek, Star Wars: Episode I – The Phantom Menace).
- 11 April
  - David Perry, 79, rugby union player (England).
  - Toby Smith, 46, keyboardist (Jamiroquai).
- 14 April
  - George William Jones, 79, political scientist and author.
  - Bill Mitchell, 65, theatre director.
  - John Woodburn, 80, racing cyclist.
- 15 April
  - Johnny Carlyle, 87, ice hockey player (Nottingham Panthers).
  - Dorothy Dorow, 86, soprano.
  - Allan Holdsworth, 70, guitarist and composer (Bruford, UK, Soft Machine).
- 16 April
  - Michael Bogdanov, 78, theatre director.
  - Rosemary Frankau, 84, actress (Terry and June).
- 17 April
  - Michael Perham, 69, Anglican prelate, Bishop of Gloucester (2004–2014).
  - Sean Scanlan, 68, actor.
- 18 April
  - Gordon Langford, 86, composer.
  - Nona Liddell, 89, violinist.
- 20 April
  - Sir Ewen Fergusson, 84, British diplomat, Ambassador to South Africa (1982–1984) and France (1987–1992).
  - Sir Geoffrey Holland, 88, civil servant.
  - Eric Ingham, 72, rugby league footballer of the 1970s.
  - Germaine Mason, 34, Jamaican-born athlete, Olympic gold medallist (2008).
- 21 April – Ugo Ehiogu, 44, footballer (Aston Villa, Middlesbrough, England) and football coach.
- 22 April
  - Olga Hegedus, 96, cellist.
  - Ian Kirkwood, Lord Kirkwood, 84, jurist, Senator of the College of Justice.
  - Sir Julian Priestley, 66, civil servant, Secretary General of the European Parliament (1997–2007).
  - Peter N. T. Wells, 80–81, medical physicist.
- 23 April
  - Leo Baxendale, 86, comics artist, creator of Little Plum, Minnie the Minx and The Bash Street Kids.
  - Michael Williams, Baron Williams of Baglan, 67, peer and diplomat.
- 24 April – Phil Edwards, 67, Olympic racing cyclist (1972).
- 26 April
  - Raj Bagri, Baron Bagri, 86, Indian-born businessman (London Metal Exchange).
  - Charles Eugster, 97, Masters athlete.
  - Peter Venables, 94, psychologist.
  - Ronald Karslake Starr Wood, 98, plant pathologist.
- 27 April – Pauline Webb, 89, ecumenist, author, and broadcaster.
- 28 April
  - Andrew Tyler, 70, animal rights campaigner and music journalist.
  - Sir John Whitmore, 79, baronet, racing driver and executive coach.
- 30 April – Clifford Brewer, 104, surgeon.

=== May ===
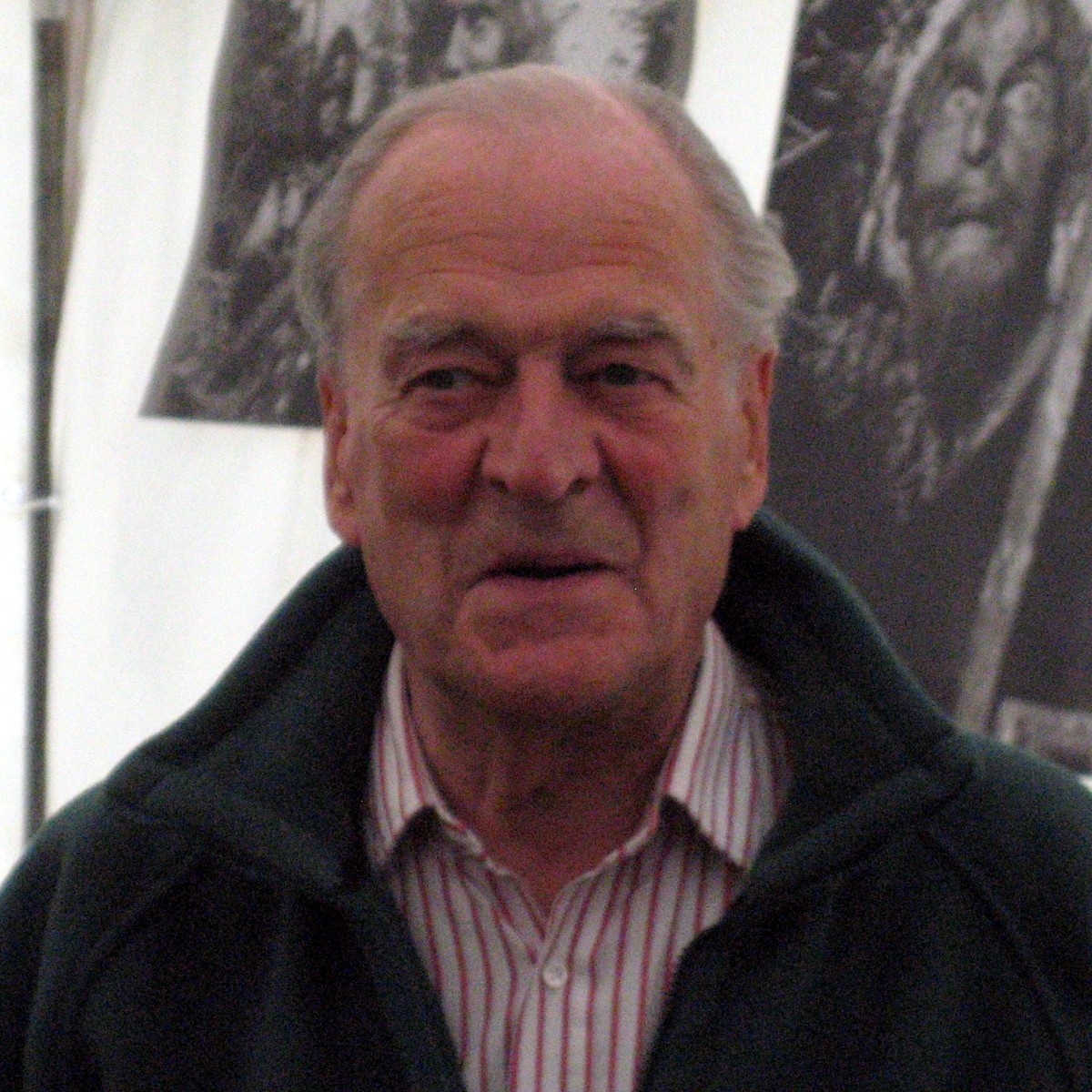
Moray Watson

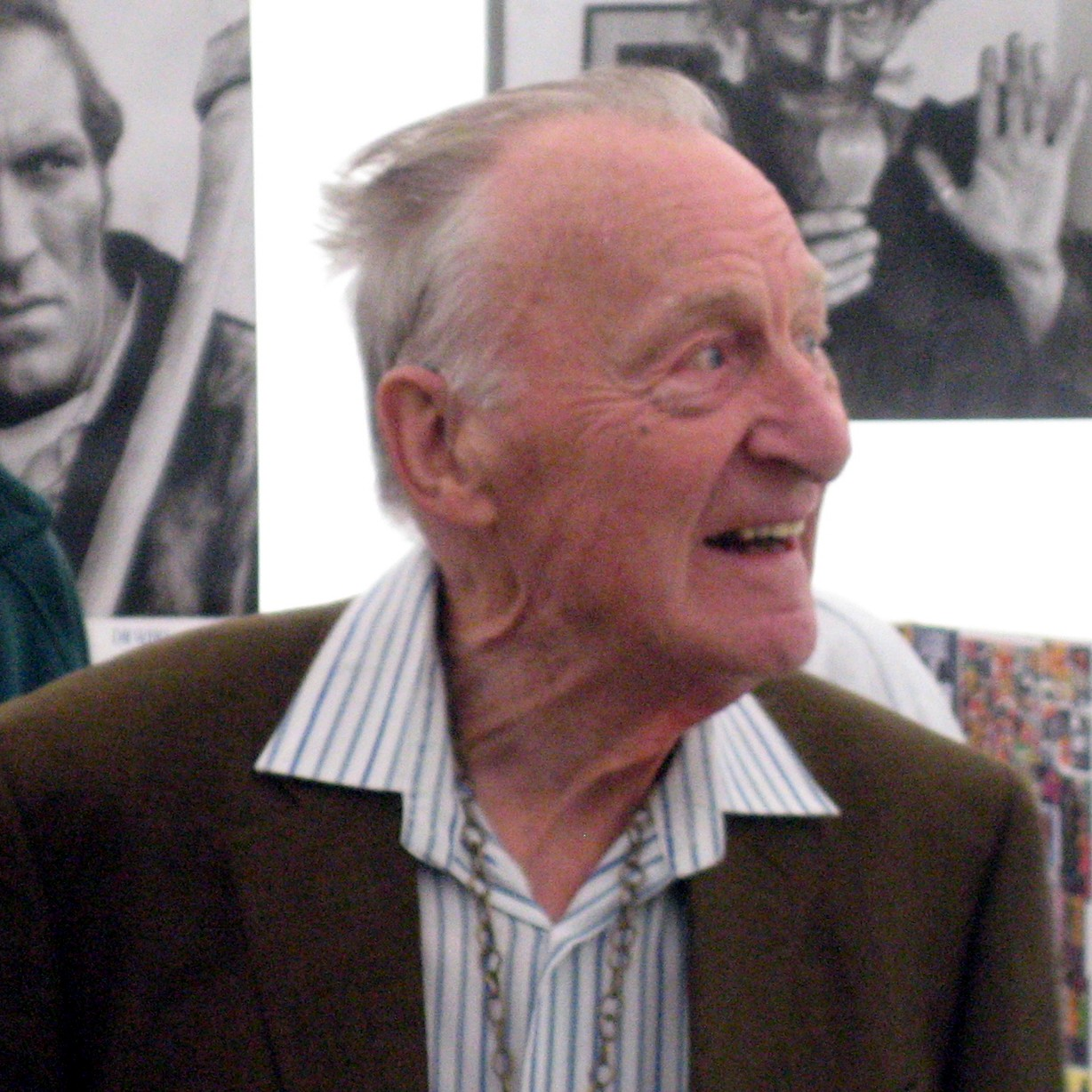
Geoffrey Bayldon

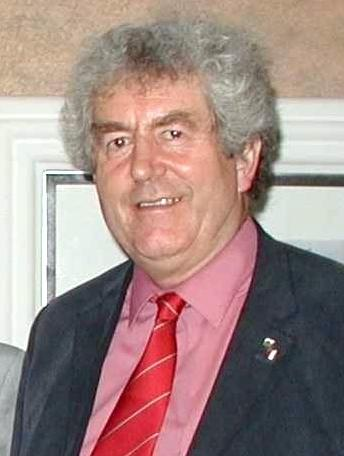
Rhodri Morgan

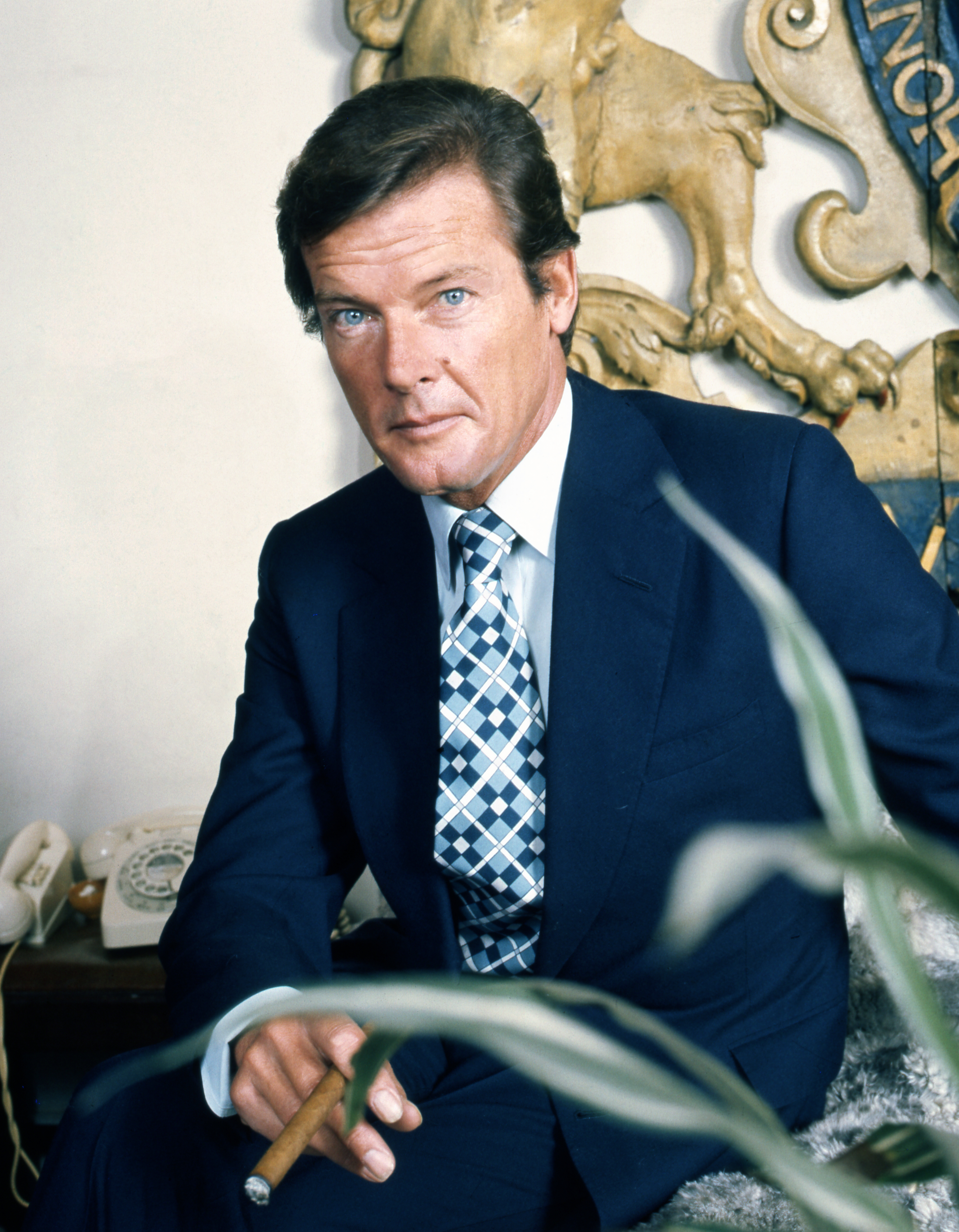
Sir Roger Moore

- 1 May – Roy Gater, 76, footballer (Port Vale, Bournemouth & Boscombe Athletic, Crewe Alexandra).
- 2 May
  - Michael Bore, 69, cricketer (Yorkshire, Nottinghamshire).
  - Cammy Duncan, 51, footballer (Motherwell, Partick Thistle, Ayr United).
  - Norma Procter, 89, opera singer.
  - Moray Watson, 88, actor (The Darling Buds of May, The Quatermass Experiment, Compact).
- 3 May – Saxa, 87, Jamaican-born saxophonist (The Beat).
- 4 May
  - Richard Dalby, 68, ghost story editor, scholar and bookseller.
  - Stephen McKenna, 78, artist.
- 5 May
  - Clive Brooks, 67, drummer (Egg, The Groundhogs, Pink Floyd).
  - Michael Wearing, 78, television producer (Edge of Darkness).
- 6 May
  - Tony Conwell, 85, footballer (Derby County, Huddersfield Town, Doncaster Rovers).
  - Peter Noble, 72, footballer (Swindon Town, Burnley).
  - Henry Tempest, 93, landowner (Broughton Hall).
- 7 May – Hugh Thomas, Baron Thomas of Swynnerton, 85, historian and life peer.
- 8 May
  - Lawson Soulsby, Baron Soulsby of Swaffham Prior, 90, microbiologist and life peer.
  - Nicolas Stacey, 89, clergyman.
- 10 May – Geoffrey Bayldon, 93, actor (Catweazle, Worzel Gummidge, Casino Royale).
- 11 May – Nigel Forman, 74, politician, MP for Carshalton and Wallington (1976–1997).
- 12 May
  - Brendan Duddy, 80, restaurateur, property developer and peace negotiator.
  - David Thomas, 74, Anglican prelate, Provincial Assistant Bishop of the Church in Wales.
- 13 May
  - Jimmy Copley, 63, drummer (Jeff Beck, Graham Parker, Tears for Fears).
  - Janet Lewis-Jones, 67, executive.
- 15 May – Ian Brady, 79, serial killer (Moors murders).
- 17 May
  - Eustace Gibbs, 3rd Baron Wraxall, 87, diplomat and aristocrat.
  - Rhodri Morgan, 77, politician, MP for Cardiff West (1987–2001), Leader of Welsh Labour (2000–2009) and First Minister of Wales (2000–2009).
  - Alan Swinbank, 72, racehorse trainer.
- 18 May – Eric Stevenson, 74, footballer (Hibernian).
- 19 May
  - John Cavell, 100, Anglican prelate, Bishop of Southampton (1972–1984).
  - Corbett Cresswell, 84, footballer (Carlisle United).
  - Tommy Ross, 70, footballer (York City).
- 20 May
  - Noel Kinsey, 91, footballer (Birmingham City).
  - James Weatherhead, 86, Church of Scotland minister, Moderator of the General Assembly of the Church of Scotland (1993–1994).
- 21 May
  - Sir Paul Judge, 68, businessman (Cadbury Schweppes, Premier Brands, Standard Bank) and political executive.
  - Sir Peter Marychurch, 89, intelligence officer, Director of GCHQ (1983–1989).
- 22 May
  - Salman Ramadan Abedi, 22, suicide bomber (Manchester Arena bombing).
  - Philippa Roles, 39, discus thrower.
- 23 May
  - Sir Roger Moore, 89, actor (Live and Let Die, The Man with the Golden Gun, The Spy Who Loved Me, Moonraker, For Your Eyes Only, Octopussy, A View to a Kill, The Persuaders!, The Saint).
  - Neville Wigram, 2nd Baron Wigram, 101, peer and Army lieutenant-colonel.
- 24 May
  - David Bobin, 71, sports broadcaster (Sky Sports).
  - George Chesworth, 86, Royal Air Force officer and Lord Lieutenant of Moray (1994–2005).
  - Tom Gilbey, 79, fashion designer.
  - Paul Keetch, 56, politician, MP for Hereford (1997–2010).
- 25 May
  - Gina Fratini, 85, fashion designer.
  - Sir Alistair Horne, 91, historian, journalist and spy.
- 27 May – Don Robinson, 84, English rugby league player (Wakefield Trinity, Leeds), world champion (1954).
- 28 May
  - Eric Broadley, 88, race car builder and founder of Lola Cars.
  - Marcus Intalex, disc jockey and record producer.
  - John Noakes, 83, television presenter (Blue Peter, Go With Noakes).
  - Graham Webb, 73, racing cyclist, road world champion (1967).
- 29 May – David Lewiston, 88, music collector.
- 30 May
  - Sir Gordon Brunton, 95, businessman.
  - Molly Peters, 75, actress (Thunderball).
  - John Taylor, 75, politician, MP for Solihull (1983–2005).
- 31 May
  - Clifford Barker, 91, Anglican prelate, Bishop of Selby (1983–1991).
  - Derek Neilson, 58, footballer (Brechin City, Berwick Rangers).

=== June ===
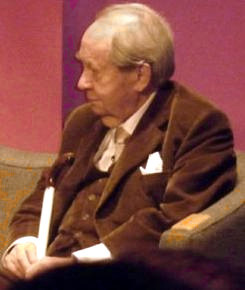
Peter Sallis

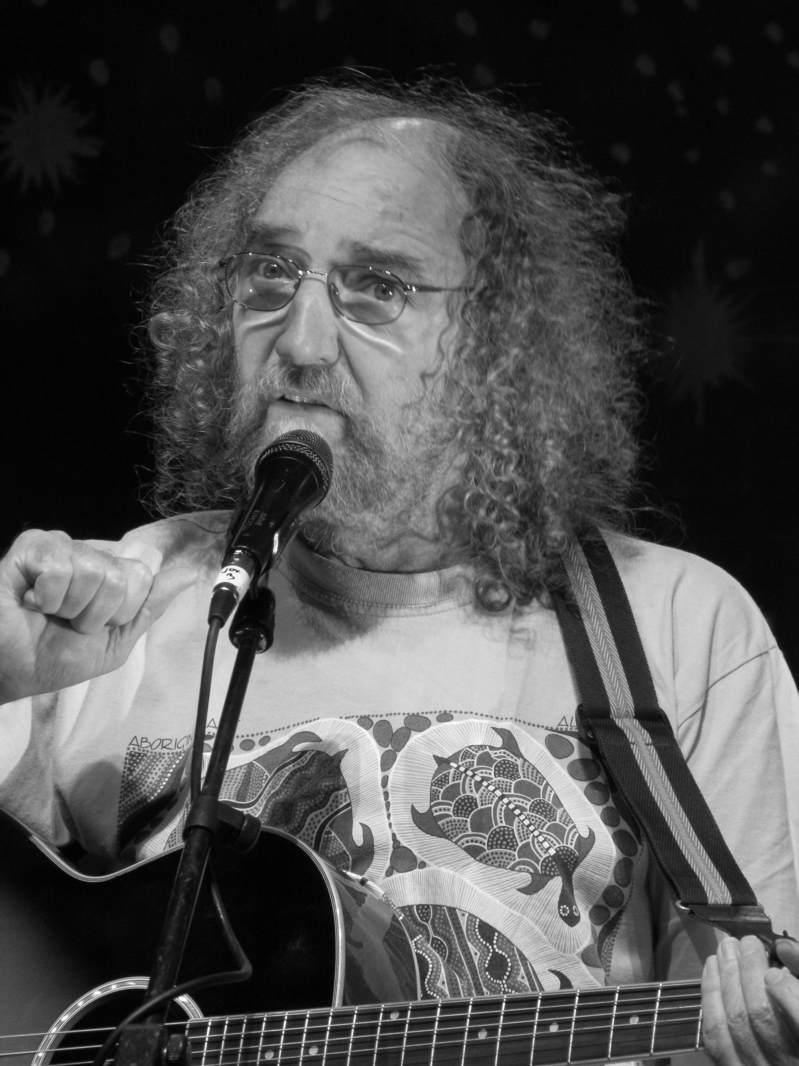
Vin Garbutt

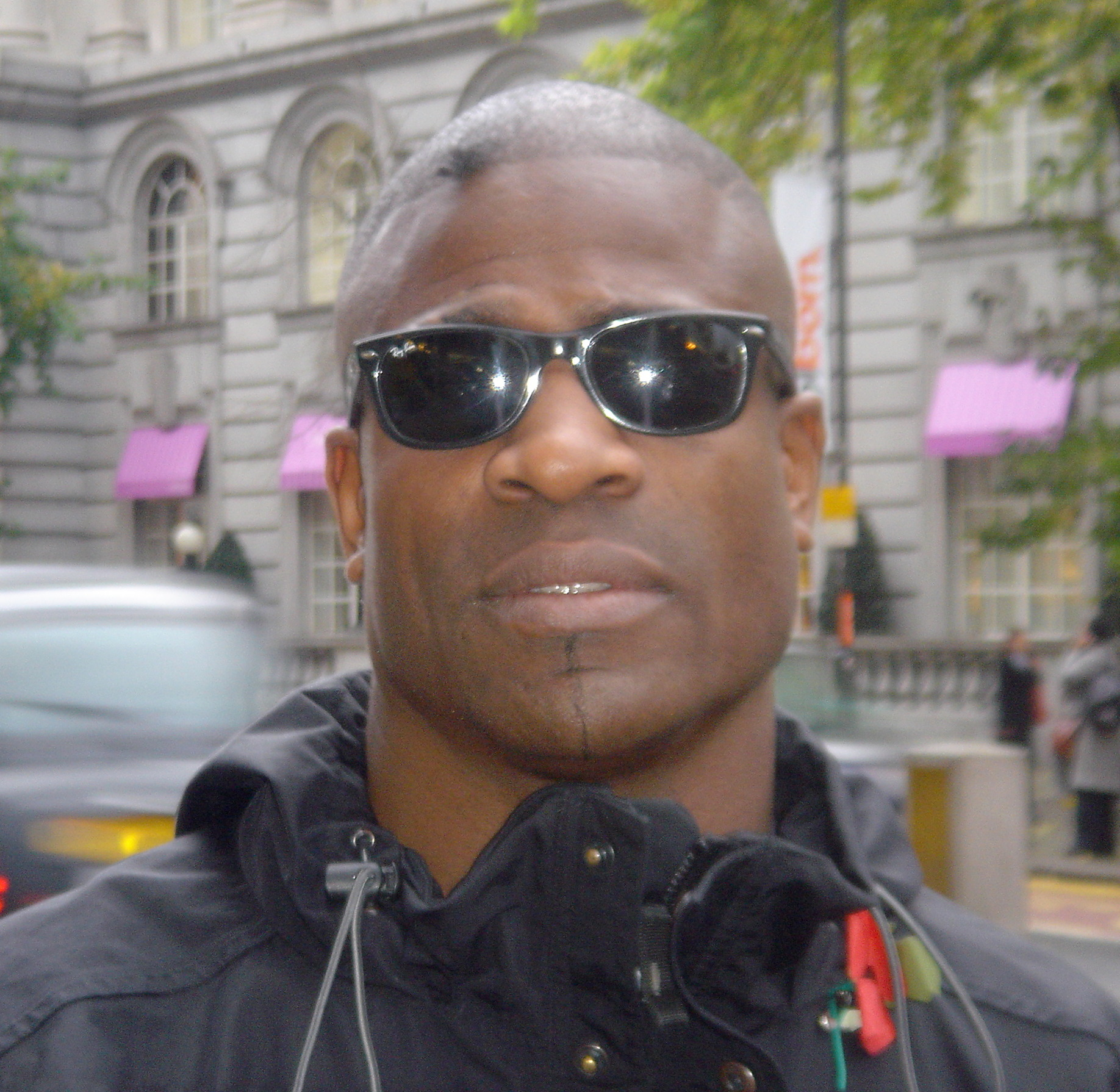
Errol Christie

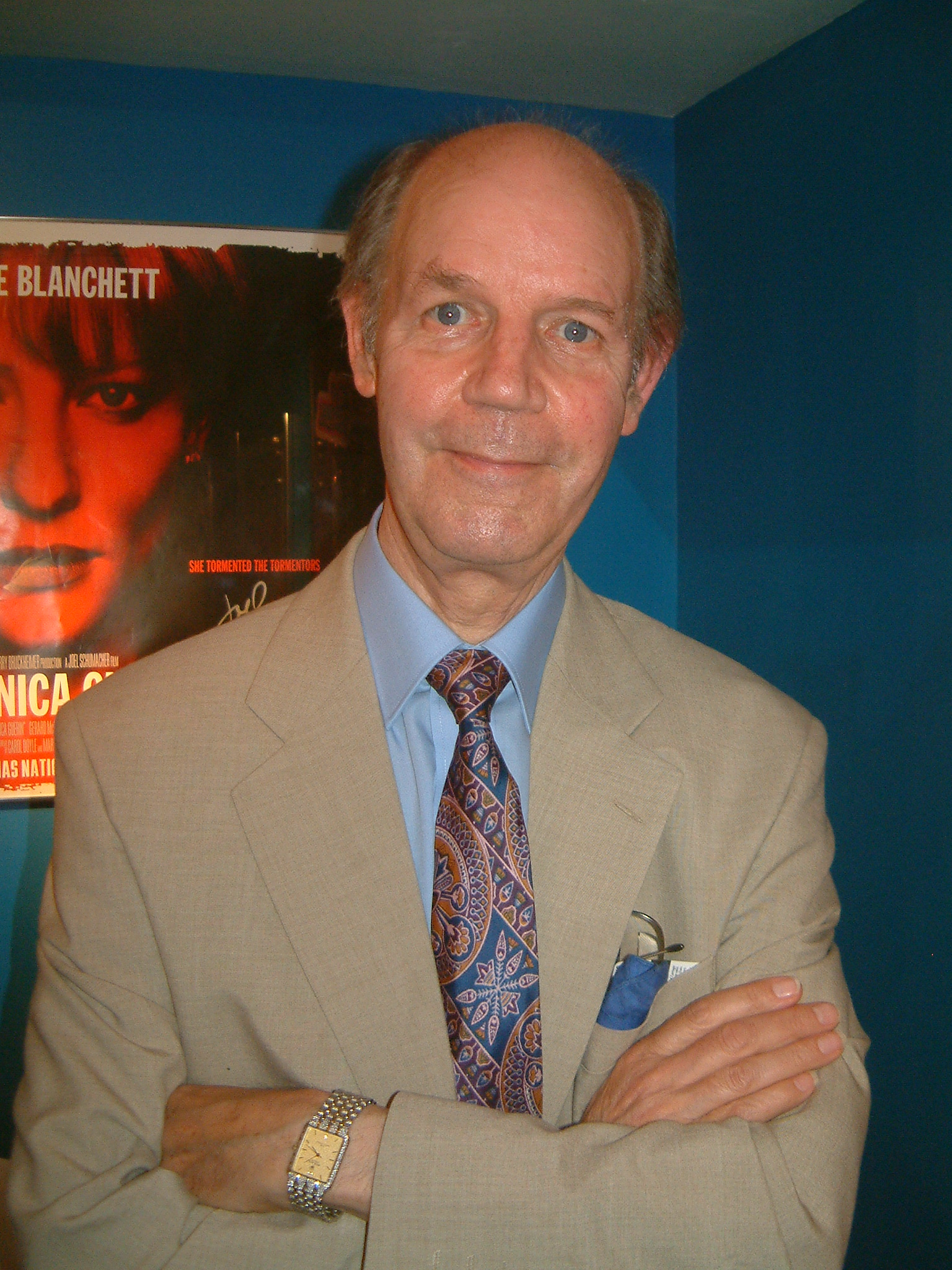
Brian Cant

- 1 June
  - Ernie Ackerley, 73, footballer (South Melbourne).
  - Roy Barraclough, 81, comedian (Cissie and Ada) and actor (Coronation Street).
  - Sir Owen Green, 92, chief executive (BTR plc).
- 2 June
  - Malcolm Lipkin, 85, composer.
  - Barrie Pettman, 73, author, publisher and philanthropist.
  - Peter Sallis, 96, actor (Last of the Summer Wine, Wallace and Gromit, The Wind in the Willows).
  - Sir Jeffrey Tate, 74, conductor.
  - Ralph Wetton, 89, footballer (Tottenham Hotspur, Plymouth Argyle).
- 4 June
  - Bill Butler, 83, film editor (A Clockwork Orange, A Touch of Class).
  - Patrick Johnston, 58, scientist and academic administrator, Vice-Chancellor of Queen's University, Belfast (2014–2017).
  - David Nicholls, 61, racehorse trainer.
- 5 June
  - Andy Cunningham, 67, magician, actor and puppeteer (Bodger & Badger).
  - Helen Dunmore, 64, writer and poet (Zennor in Darkness).
- 6 June
  - Vin Garbutt, 69, folk singer (When the Tide Turns, Bandalised, Word of Mouth).
  - Davey Lambert, 48, motorcycle racer.
  - Peter Norburn, 86, English rugby league footballer of the 1950s and 1960s
  - Bill Walker, 88, politician, MP for Perth and East Perthshire (1979–1983) and North Tayside (1983–1997).
- 7 June
  - Angela Hartley Brodie, 82, cancer researcher.
  - Arthur Bunting, 80, rugby league player and coach (Hull Kingston Rovers, Hull F.C.).
  - Ernie Edds, 91, footballer (Plymouth Argyle, Torquay United).
  - Ed Victor, 77, American-born literary agent.
- 8 June – Naseem Khan, 77, journalist.
- 9 June
  - John Heyman, 84, producer (D.A.R.Y.L.).
  - Lady Mary Holborow, 80, magistrate, Lord Lieutenant of Cornwall (1994–2011).
  - Sheila Willcox, 81, equestrian, European champion (1957).
- 10 June
  - Ray J. Ceresa, 83, philatelist.
  - Peter Hocken, 84, theologian and historian.
- 11 June
  - Alan Campbell, 67, Pentecostal pastor and author.
  - Errol Christie, 53, boxer.
  - Nigel Grainge, 70, music industry executive (Ensign Records).
  - Geoffrey Rowell, 74, Anglican prelate, Bishop of Basingstoke (1994–2001) and Europe (2001–2013).
  - Clive Rushton, 69, swimmer and swimming coach.
- 12 June
  - Sam Beazley, 101, actor (Harry Potter and the Order of the Phoenix, Johnny English).
  - Brian Bellhouse, 80, academic, engineer and entrepreneur.
  - Brian Taylor, 84, cricketer (Essex).
  - Donald Winch, 82, economist and academic (University of Sussex).
- 13 June
  - Richard Long, 4th Viscount Long, 88, peer and politician.
  - Patricia Knatchbull, 2nd Countess Mountbatten of Burma, 93, peeress.
- 14 June – Khadija Saye, 24, photographer, victim of the Grenfell Tower fire.
- 15 June
  - Martin Aitken, 95, archaeometrist.
  - Kyla Greenbaum, 95, pianist.
- 18 June
  - Albert Franks, 81, footballer (Newcastle United, Rangers, Greenock Morton).
  - Joel Joffe, Baron Joffe, 85, South African-born human rights lawyer and life peer.
  - Joyce Lindores, 73, bowler, Commonwealth Games gold medallist (1988).
- 19 June
  - Brian Cant, 83, actor (Dappledown Farm) and television presenter (Play School).
  - Sir Brian Kenny, 83, army general, Deputy Supreme Allied Commander Europe (1990–1993).
- 20 June – James Berry, 93, Jamaican-born poet.
- 21 June
  - John Faull, 83, rugby union player (Swansea, British Lions).
  - Brian Street, 73, anthropologist.
- 23 June – John Freeman, 83, rugby league player (Halifax).
- 25 June
  - Denis McQuail, 82, communication theorist.
  - Robert Overend, 86, farmer and politician.
  - Sir Richard Paniguian, 67, civil servant and industrialist.
  - Gordon Wilson, 79, politician, leader of the Scottish National Party (1979–1990), MP (1974–1987).
- 26 June
  - David Bleakley, 92, politician, Northern Irish MP (1958–1965).
  - Rex Makin, 91, solicitor.
- 27 June
  - Michael Bond, 91, children's author (Paddington Bear).
  - Roger Toulson, Lord Toulson, 70, lawyer and Supreme Court judge.
- 28 June – John Higgins, 87, footballer (Hibernian).
- 29 June – James Davidson, 90, politician, MP for West Aberdeenshire (1966–1970).
- 30 June – Barry Norman, 83, film critic, writer and media personality (Film...)

=== July ===
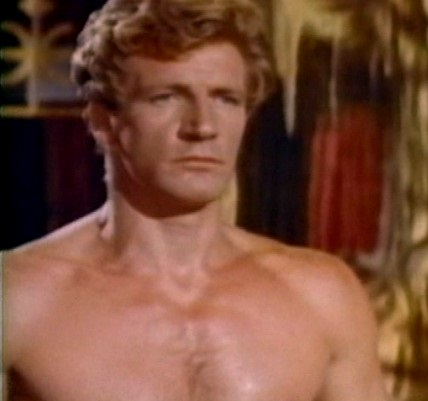
Joe Robinson

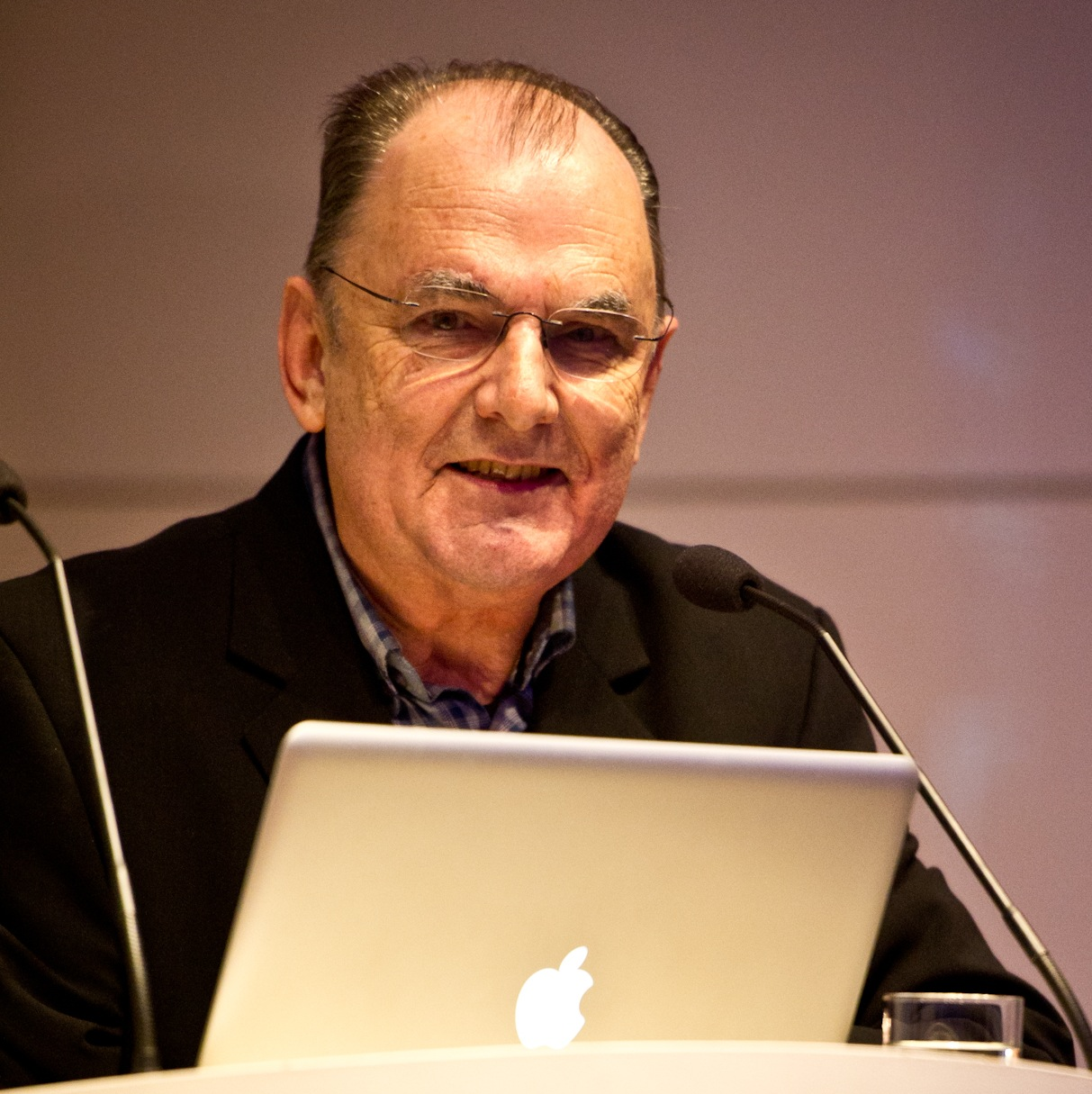
Bryan Avery

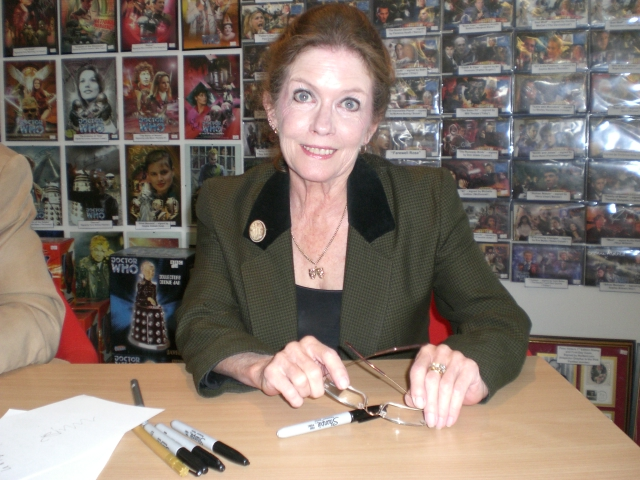
Deborah Watling

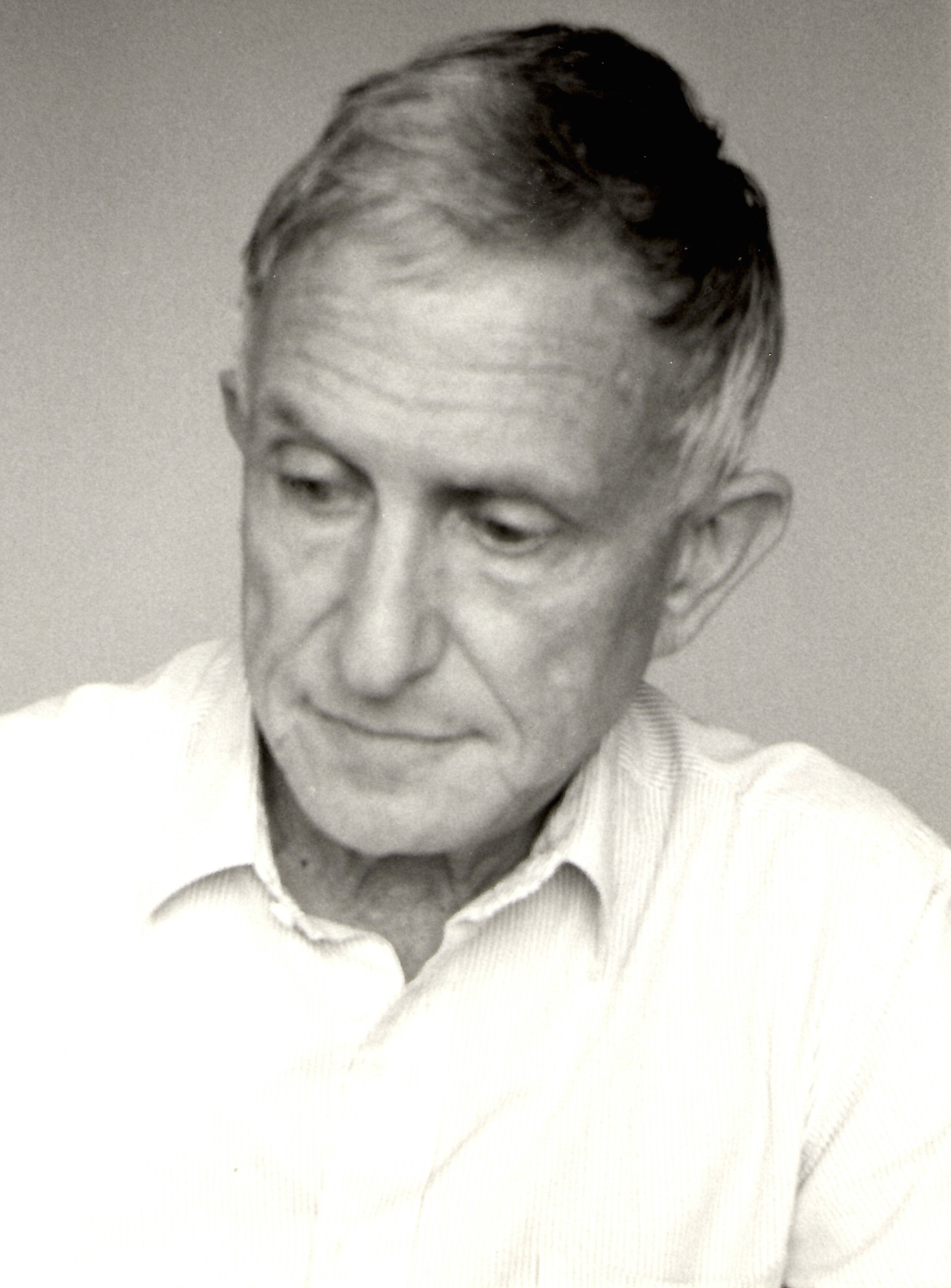
Gabriel Epstein

- 1 July
  - Richard Gilbert Scott, 93, architect.
  - Stephen Tindale, 54, environmentalist.
  - Heathcote Williams, 75, author and actor.
- 2 July
  - Tony Bianchi, 65, author.
  - Ron Fuller, 80, artist and toy designer.
  - John McCormick, 80, footballer (Crystal Palace, Aberdeen).
  - Bert Rossi, 94, gangster.
  - Michael Sandberg, Baron Sandberg, 90, banker and life peer, Chairman of HSBC (1977–1986).
- 3 July – Joe Robinson, 90, actor (Diamonds Are Forever, The Loneliness of the Long Distance Runner, Thor and the Amazon Women).
- 4 July
  - Bryan Avery, 73, architect.
  - Carol Lee Scott, 74, actress and singer (Grotbags).
- 5 July
  - Paul Hollingdale, 79, radio personality (BBC Radio 2).
  - John McKenzie, 91, footballer (Partick Thistle, Dumbarton, Scotland).
  - Mark Wilkinson, 66, furniture designer.
  - Roger Wootton, 73, aeronautical engineer and balloonist.
- 6 July
  - Frederick Tuckman, 95, politician, MEP for Leicester (1979–1989).
  - Ken Wimshurst, 79, footballer (Bristol City).
- 7 July
  - Tony Moore, 69, footballer (Chester City, Chesterfield).
  - Ian Posgate, 85, insurance underwriter.
- 8 July – Evan Armstrong, 74, boxer of the 1960s and 1970s.
- 9 July
  - Clare Douglas, 73, film editor (United 93, Tinker Tailor Soldier Spy).
  - John McKnight, 86, Gaelic football player (Armagh GAA).
- 11 July – Denis Mack Smith, 97, historian.
- 13 July
  - John Dalby, 88, singer, composer and pianist.
  - Vince Farrar, 70, rugby league player (Featherstone Rovers, Sheffield Eagles, Hull).
- 14 July
  - Bert Hill, 87, footballer (Colchester United).
  - Roland Moyle, 89, politician, MP for Lewisham North (1966–1974) and Lewisham East (1974–1983).
- 15 July
  - Wesley Carr, 75, Anglican priest, Dean of Westminster (1997–2006).
  - Davie Laing, 92, footballer (Heart of Midlothian).
- 16 July – Trevor Baxter, 84, actor (Doctor Who, Maelstrom, Sky Captain and the World of Tomorrow) and playwright.
- 19 July
  - David E. H. Jones, 79, chemist and author.
  - Mary Turner, 79, Irish-born trade unionist.
  - Joe Walters, 79, footballer (Clyde).
- 20 July
  - Stephen Haseler, 75, academic.
  - John McCluskey, Baron McCluskey, 88, lawyer, judge and life peer, Solicitor General for Scotland (1974–1979).
- 21 July
  - Pudsey, 11, Border-Collie performing dog (Britain's Got Talent, Pudsey: The Movie, Mr Stink).
  - Gary Waller, 72, politician, MP for Brighouse and Spenborough (1979–1983) and Keighley (1983–1997).
  - Deborah Watling, 69, actress (Doctor Who, Take Me High, The Invisible Man).
- 22 July
  - Robert Loder, 83, art collector.
  - Edward Norfolk, 95, Anglican priest, Archdeacon of St Albans (1982–1987).
- 23 July – Simon Doggart, 56, head teacher and cricketer (Cambridge University).
- 24 July – Michael Manktelow, 89, Anglican prelate, Bishop of Basingstoke (1977–1993).
- 25 July
  - Hywel Bennett, 73, actor (The Virgin Soldiers, Shelley, EastEnders).
  - Sydney Cohen, 95, South African-born pathologist.
  - Gabriel Epstein, 98, German-born architect.
  - John Wraw, 58, Anglican prelate, Bishop of Bradwell (since 2012).
- 26 July – Jimmy White, 75, footballer (AFC Bournemouth, Portsmouth, Gillingham).
- 27 July – Rob Anker, 27, dancer (Diversity), winner of Britain's Got Talent (2009).
- 28 July
  - Edward Allcard, 102, naval architect and yachtsman.
  - Derek Nippard, 86, football referee
  - Rosemary Anne Sisson, 93, author and scriptwriter.
- 31 July
  - Alan Cameron, 79, classicist and academic.
  - Peter Lewington, 67, cricketer (Warwickshire, Berkshire).

=== August ===
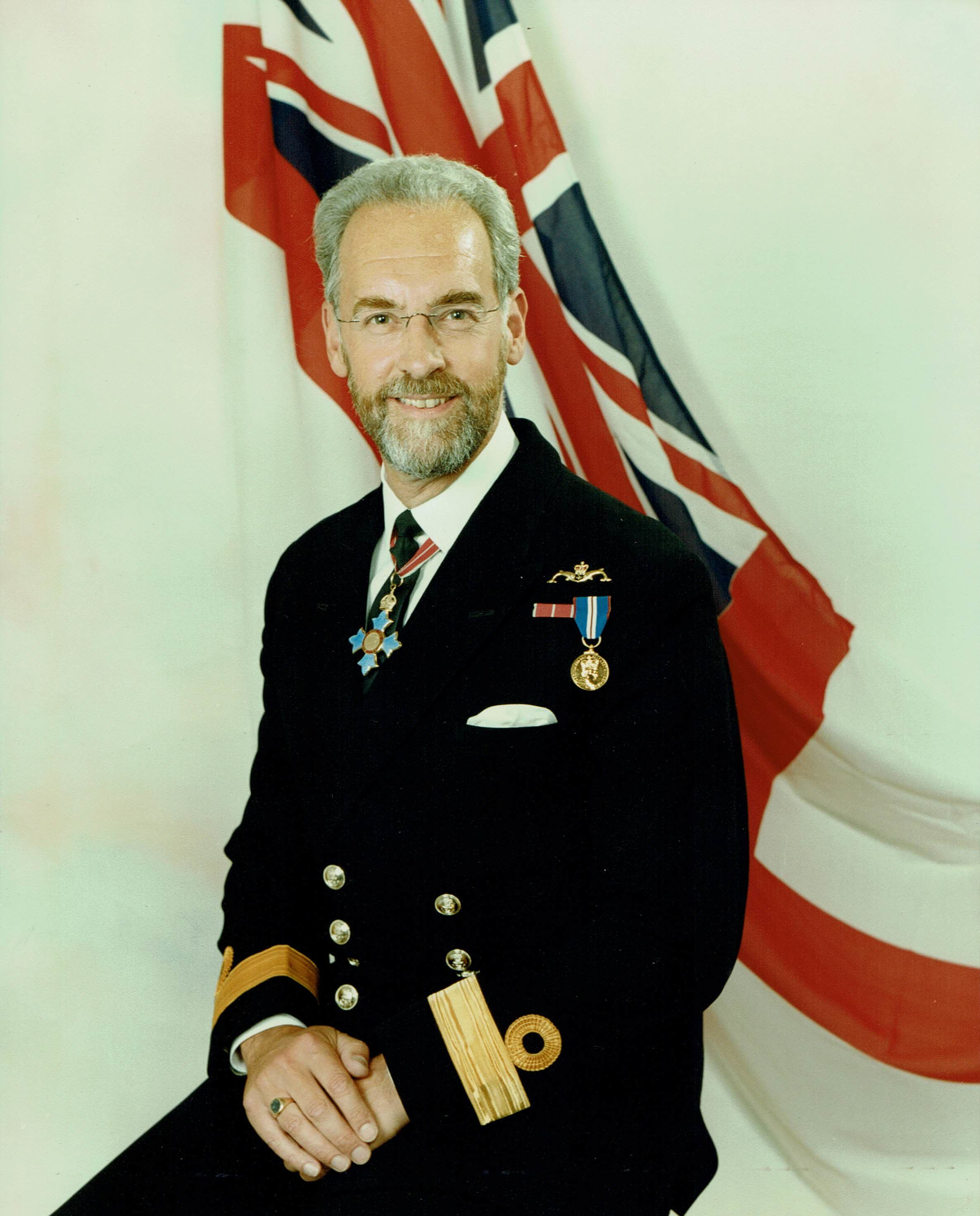
Commodore Laurie Brokenshire

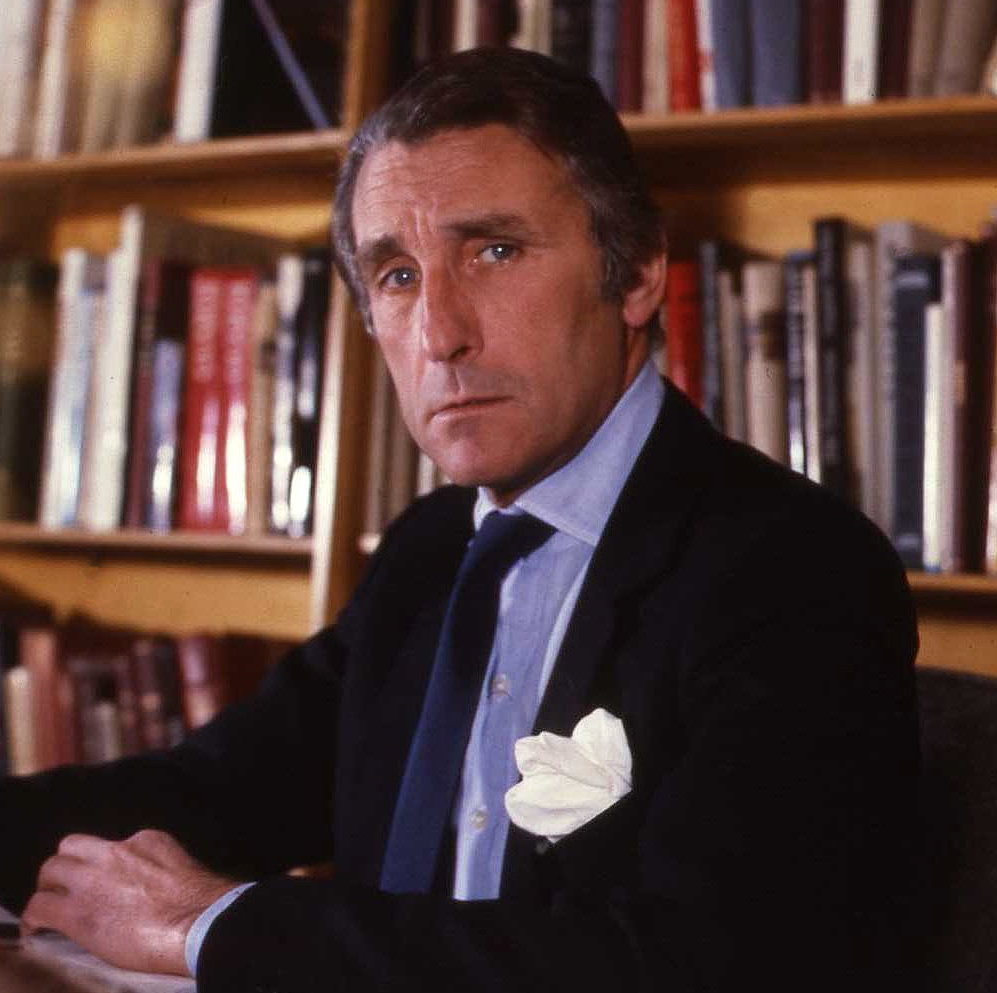
11th Duke of Beaufort

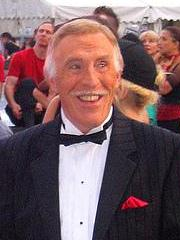
Sir Bruce Forsyth

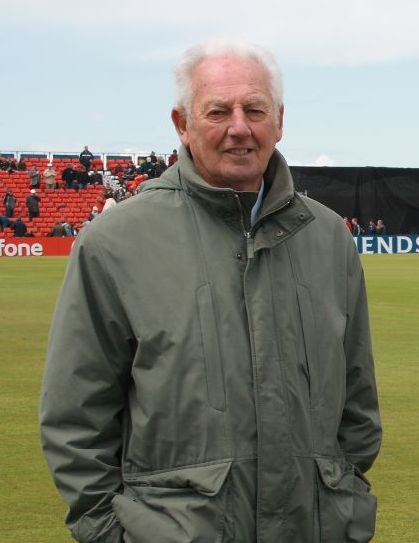
Don Shepherd

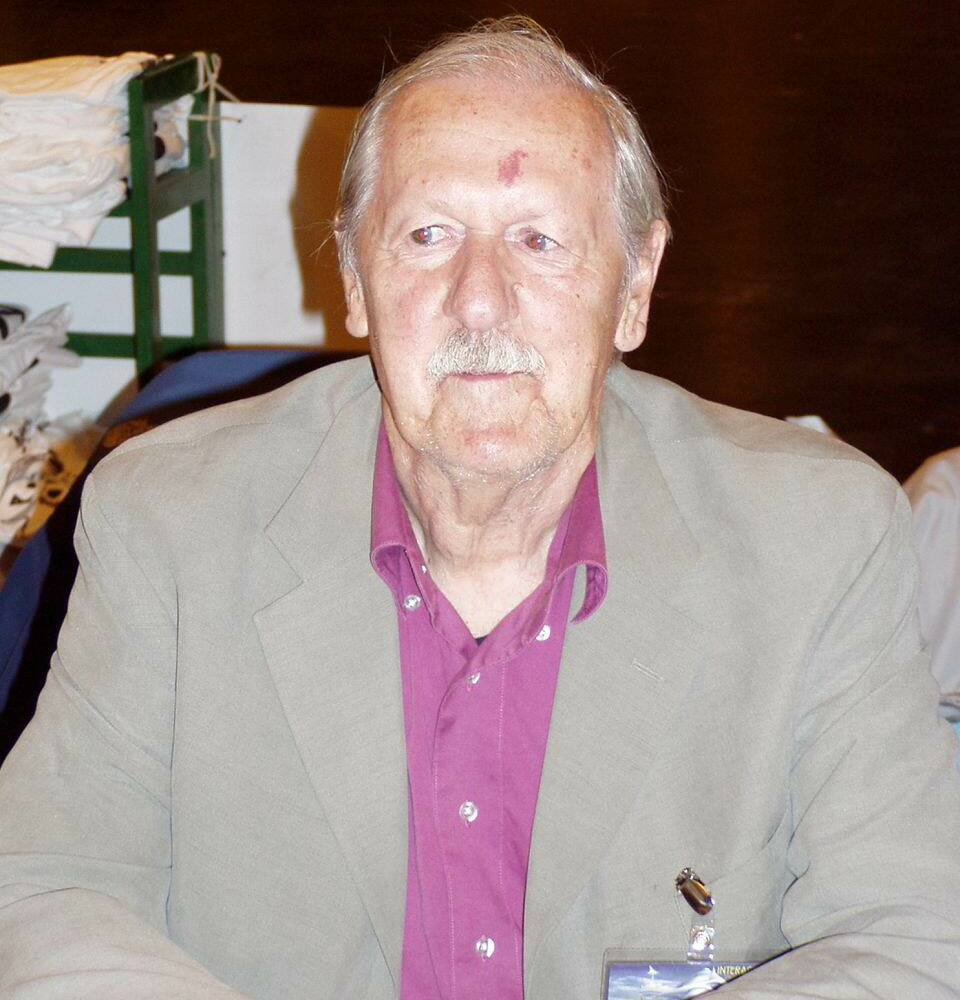
Brian Aldiss

- 1 August
  - Sir Patrick Bateson, 79, biologist, Provost of King's College, Cambridge (1987–2003).
  - Sir John Blelloch, 86, civil servant, Permanent Secretary at the Northern Ireland Office (1988–1990).
  - Ian Graham, 93, Mayanist.
- 2 August
  - Dave Caldwell, 85, footballer (Aberdeen).
  - Robin Eady, 76, dermatologist.
  - David Ince, 96, World War II RAF officer.
  - Graham Wiltshire, 86, cricket player and coach (Gloucestershire).
- 3 August
  - David James Bowen, 91, academic (University of Wales, Aberystwyth).
  - Robert Hardy, 91, actor (All Creatures Great and Small, Winston Churchill: The Wilderness Years, Harry Potter).
  - Garry Hart, Baron Hart of Chilton, 77, life peer.
- 4 August
  - Laurie Brokenshire, 64, Royal Navy officer and magician.
  - Chuck Hay, 87, curler.
- 5 August
  - Dame Helen Alexander, 60, businesswoman, President of the Confederation of British Industry (2009–2011), Chairwoman of the Port of London Authority (2010–2015) and Chancellor of the University of Southampton (since 2011).
  - Lee Blakeley, 45, opera and theatre director.
  - Doug Insole, 91, cricketer (Essex, England).
- 6 August
  - Arthur Boyars, 92, poet and musicologist.
  - Kevin McNamara, 82, former Labour Party MP and Shadow Secretary of State for Northern Ireland.
- 8 August
  - Mike Deakin, 83, footballer (Crystal Palace).
  - Ken Roberts, rugby league player (Swinton, Halifax, Great Britain).
- 9 August – Thomas A. Bird, 98, WWII Army major and architect.
- 10 August
  - Chris Hesketh, 72–73, rugby league player (Wigan, Salford, Great Britain).
  - T. Jack Thompson, 74, historian.
- 11 August
  - Susan Brown, 79, mathematician.
  - Ted Corbett, 82, cricket writer (The Hindu).
  - Richard Gordon, 95, author and physician (Doctor).
- 13 August – Victor Pemberton, 85, writer and television producer (Doctor Who, Fraggle Rock, The Adventures of Black Beauty).
- 15 August
  - Joe McGurn, 52, footballer (St Johnstone, Alloa Athletic, Stenhousemuir).
  - Paul Oliver, 90, architecture and blues historian.
  - Diane Pearson, 85, book editor and author.
- 16 August
  - Jennifer Daniel, 81, actress.
  - John Ogston, 78, footballer (Aberdeen).
  - David Somerset, 11th Duke of Beaufort, 89, peer.
- 18 August
  - Sir Bruce Forsyth, 89, television presenter and entertainer (The Generation Game, Play Your Cards Right, The Price is Right, You Bet!, Strictly Come Dancing).
  - Liz MacKean, 52, broadcast journalist (Newsnight).
  - Duncan Russell, 59, football manager (Mansfield Town).
  - Don Shepherd, 90, cricketer (Glamorgan).
- 19 August – Brian Aldiss, 92, science fiction writer (Helliconia) and editor.
- 20 August
  - Bernard Dunstan, 97, artist.
  - Gordon Williams, 83, writer (The Siege of Trencher's Farm).
- 21 August
  - Bill Green, 66, footballer (Hartlepool United, Chesterfield) and football manager (Scunthorpe United).
  - Dame Margaret Turner-Warwick, 92, physician and thoracic specialist, first woman president of the Royal College of Physicians.
- 22 August – Michael J. C. Gordon, 69, computer scientist.
- 23 August
  - Michael Dauncey, 97, Army brigadier.
  - John Petty, 82, Anglican priest.
  - Francis Michael Longstreth Thompson, 92, economic and social historian.
- 24 August – Alan Boswell, 74, footballer (Shrewsbury Town, Bolton Wanderers).
- 26 August – Christie Davies, 75, sociologist.
- 27 August – Christopher Winn, 90, cricketer (Sussex, Oxford University).
- 28 August – Melissa Bell, 53, singer (Soul II Soul).
- 30 August
  - Marjorie Boulton, 93, author and poet.
  - Alan MacDonald, 61, production designer (The Queen, The Best Exotic Marigold Hotel, Philomena).
- 31 August
  - Sir Edward du Cann, 93, politician, MP for Taunton (1956–1987).
  - Ann Jellicoe, 91, dramatist.
  - Tormod MacGill-Eain, 80, comedian and singer.

=== September ===
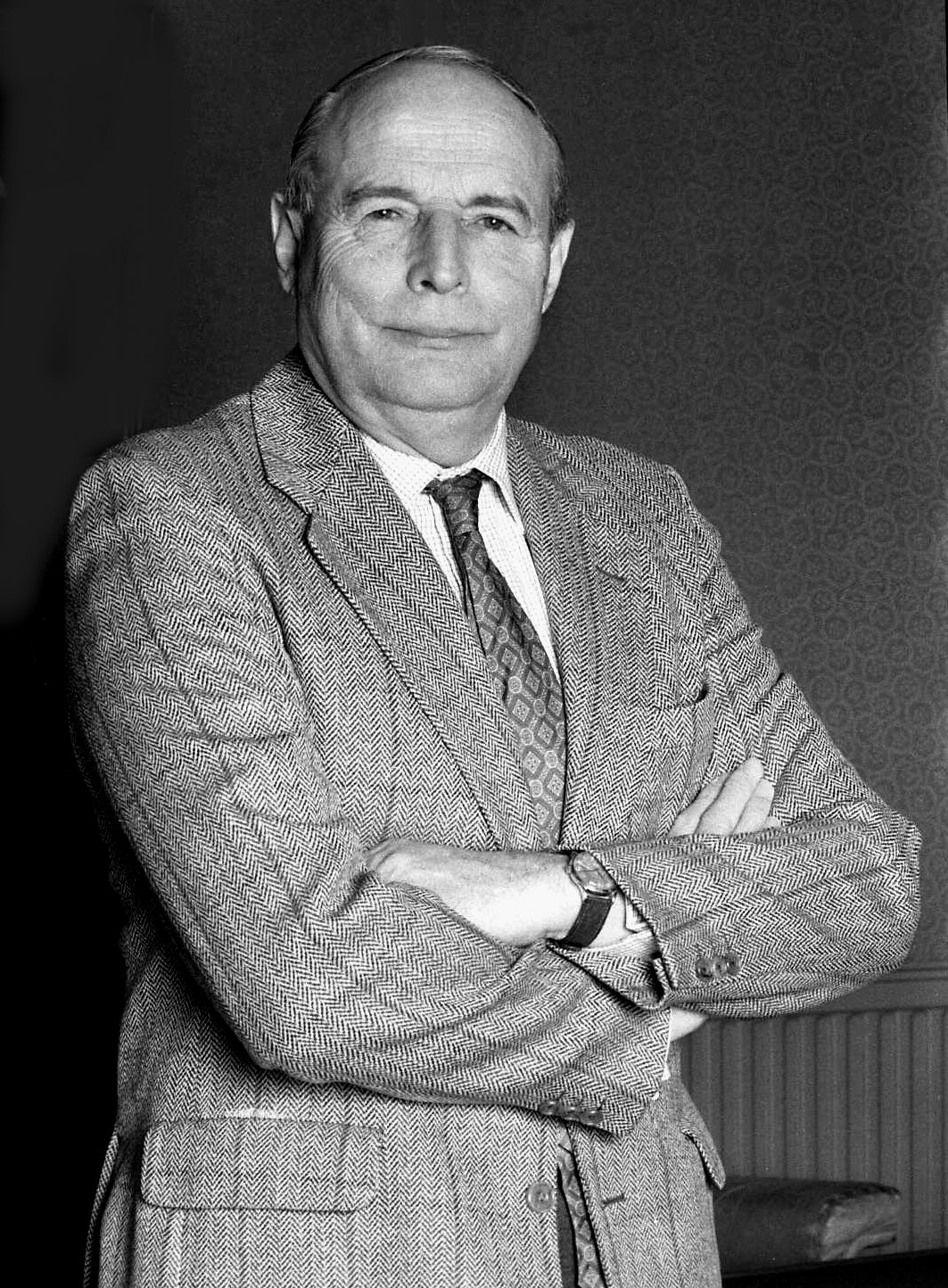
10th Duke of Richmond

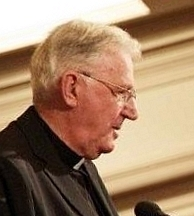
Cardinal Cormac Murphy-O'Connor

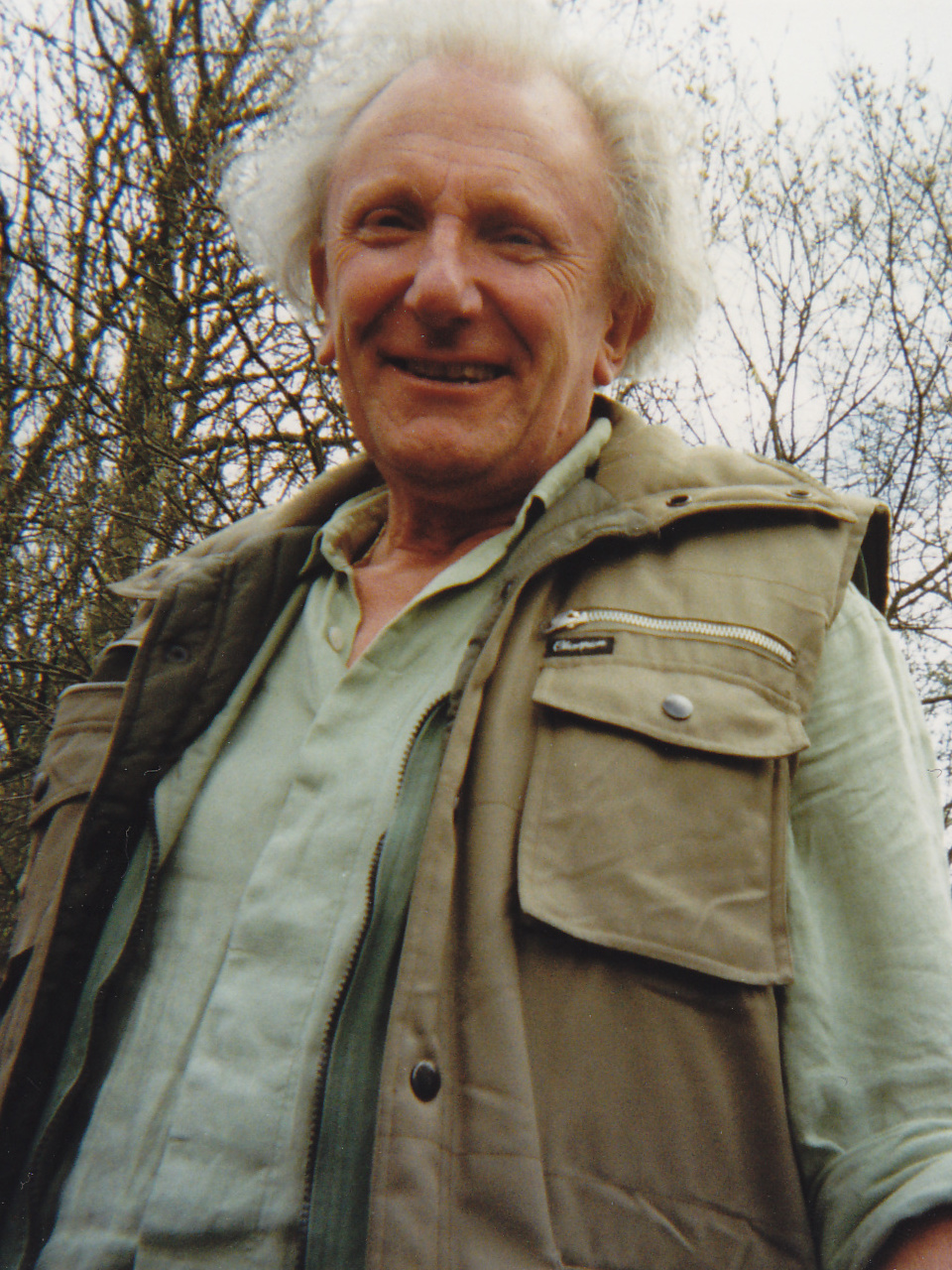
David Shepherd

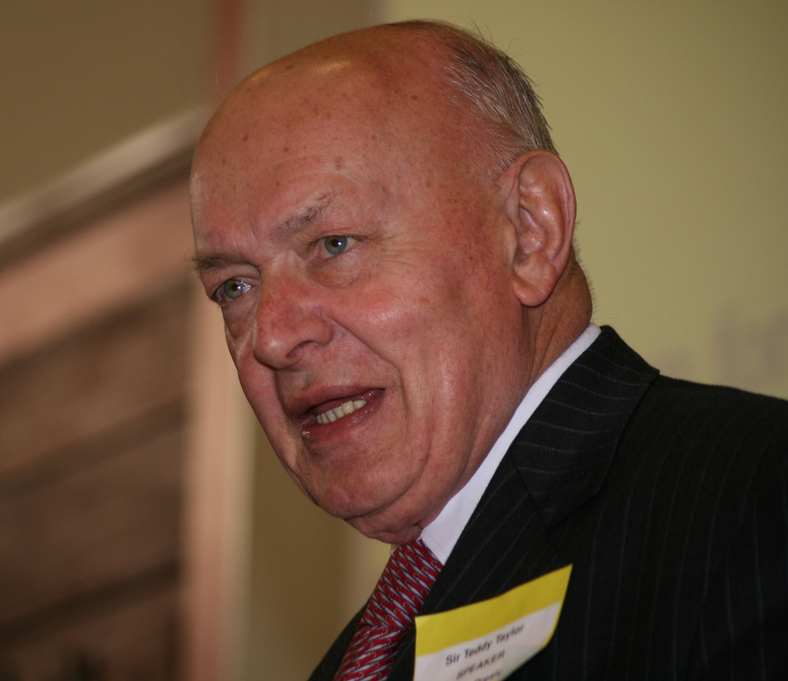
Sir Teddy Taylor

- 1 September
  - Ralph Dellor, 69, cricketer and broadcaster.
  - Charles Gordon-Lennox, 10th Duke of Richmond, 87, peer.
  - Cormac Murphy-O'Connor, 85, Roman Catholic cardinal, Archbishop of Arundel and Brighton (1977–2000) and Archbishop of Westminster (2000–2009).
  - Mick Softley, 77–78, singer-songwriter and guitarist.
- 3 September – Larrington Walker, 70, Jamaican-born actor (Taboo).
- 4 September – Les McDonald, 84, triathlon competitor and administrator.
- 6 September
  - Derek Bourgeois, 75, composer.
  - Mike Neville, 80, television presenter (BBC North East, ITV Tyne Tees).
- 7 September
  - Terence Harvey, 72, actor (Hollyoaks, From Hell, The Phantom of the Opera).
  - Mike Hicks, 80, politician, General Secretary of the Communist Party of Britain (1988–1998).
- 10 September
  - Stephen Begley, 42, rugby union player (Glasgow Warriors).
  - Sir David Robert Ford, 82, government official, Chief Secretary of Hong Kong (1986–1993).
  - James Morwood, 73, classical scholar.
- 11 September
  - Jan Brittin, 58, cricketer.
  - Sir Peter Hall, 86, theatre, opera and film director, director of the National Theatre (1973–1988).
- 12 September – Bert McCann, 84, footballer (Motherwell, Scotland).
- 13 September – Derek Wilkinson, 82, footballer (Sheffield Wednesday).
- 14 September – Michael Freeman, 85, orthopaedic surgeon.
- 15 September
  - Leon Mestel, 90, astronomer and astrophysicist.
  - Geoff Wragg, 87, horse trainer.
- 16 September – Steve Evans, 59, rugby league player (Hull FC, Featherstone Rovers).
- 17 September – Suzan Farmer, 75, actress (The Scarlet Blade, Doctor in Clover, Coronation Street).
- 18 September
  - Sydney Starkie, 91, cricketer (Northamptonshire).
  - Paul Wilson, 66, footballer (Celtic, Scotland).
- 19 September
  - Sir Brian Barder, 83, diplomat, High Commissioner to Nigeria (1988–1991) and Australia (1991–1994).
  - Christine Butler, 73, politician, MP for Castle Point (1997–2001).
  - Sir John Hunt, 88, politician, MP for Bromley (1964–1974) and Ravensbourne (1974–1997).
  - David Shepherd, 86, artist and conservationist.
- 20 September
  - Ken Dean, 90, rugby league footballer of the 1940s, 1950s and 1960s.
  - Sir Teddy Taylor, 80, politician, MP for Glasgow Cathcart (1964–1979) and Rochford and Southend East (1980–2005).
- 21 September
  - Edward Allington, 66, sculptor.
  - William G. Stewart, 82, game show host (Fifteen to One) and television producer.
- 22 September
  - Mike Carr, 79, jazz organist and pianist.
  - Bill Michie, 81, politician, MP for Sheffield Heeley (1983–2001).
  - John Worsdale, 68, footballer (Stoke City, Lincoln City).
- 24 September – Jack Good, 86, television and theatre producer, musician and record producer.
- 25 September
  - Tony Booth, 85, actor (Till Death Us Do Part, Coronation Street) and political activist.
  - Elizabeth Dawn, 77, actress (Coronation Street).
  - Aneurin Jones, 87, painter.
  - Bobby Knutt, 71, actor and comedian (Coronation Street, Benidorm, Emmerdale).
  - Freddy Shepherd, 76, businessman (Newcastle United).
- 26 September
  - Mehmet Aksoy, 32, filmmaker.
  - Sir James Craig, 93, diplomat, Ambassador to Syria (1976–1979) and Saudi Arabia (1979–1984).
- 27 September – Sir Richard Greenbury, 81, businessman, Chairman of Marks and Spencer (1988–1999).
- 28 September
  - Donald Mitchell, 92, musicologist.
  - Alan Thompson, 54, broadcaster (BBC Radio Wales).
  - Benjamin Whitrow, 80, actor (Pride and Prejudice, Personal Services, Quadrophenia).
- 30 September – Apex, 36, drum and bass music producer.

=== October ===
Rodney Bickerstaffe

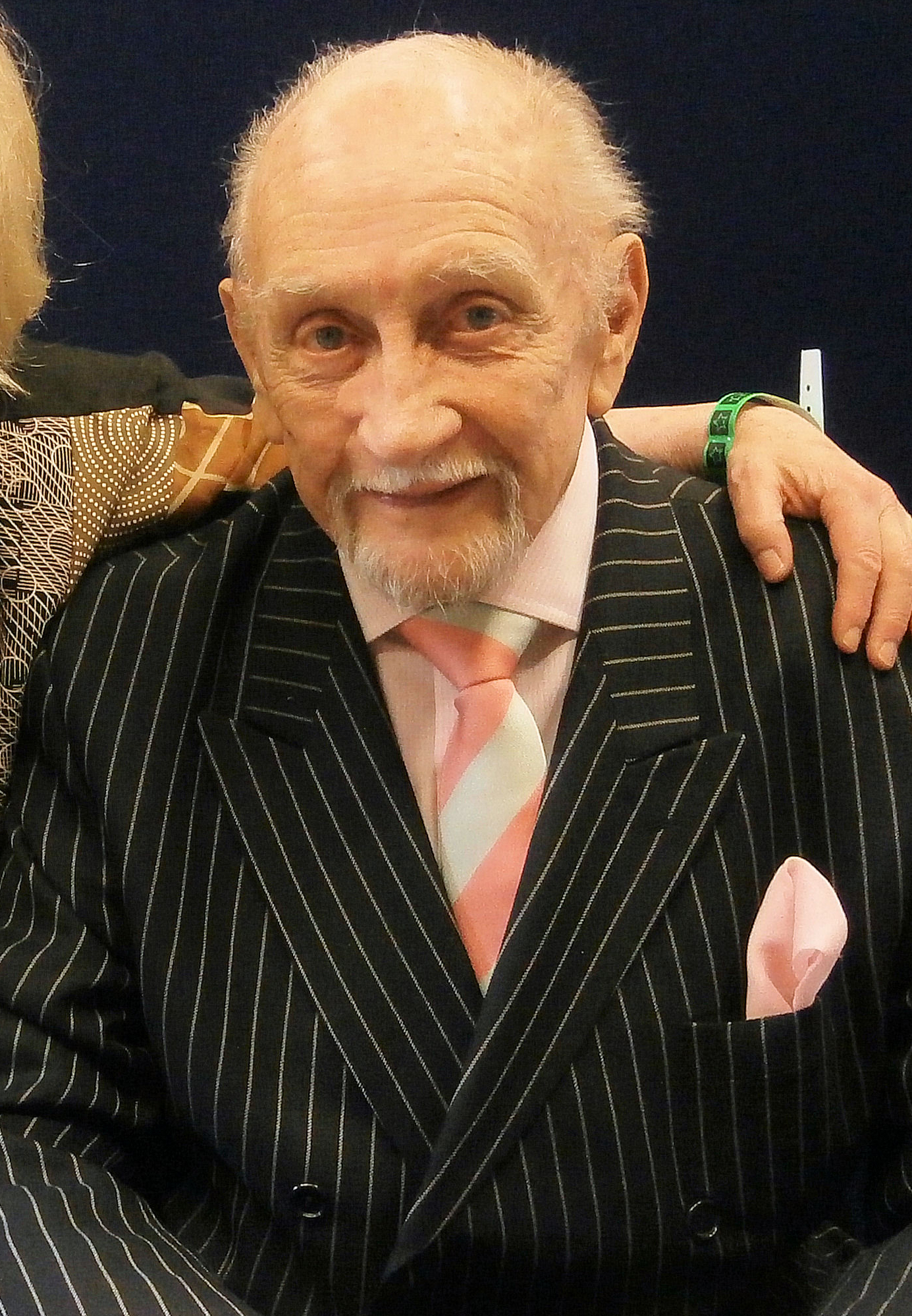
Roy Dotrice

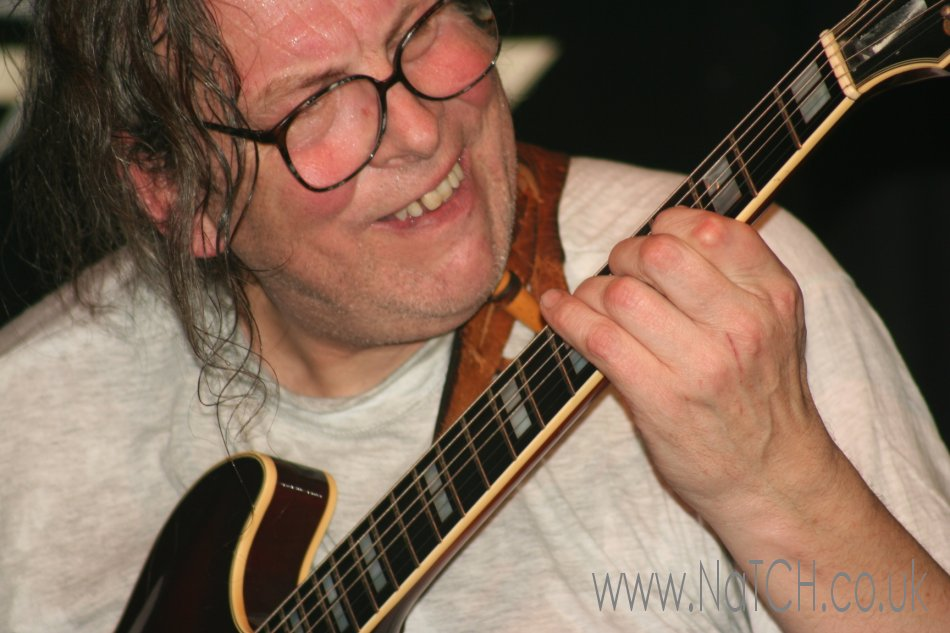
Phil Miller

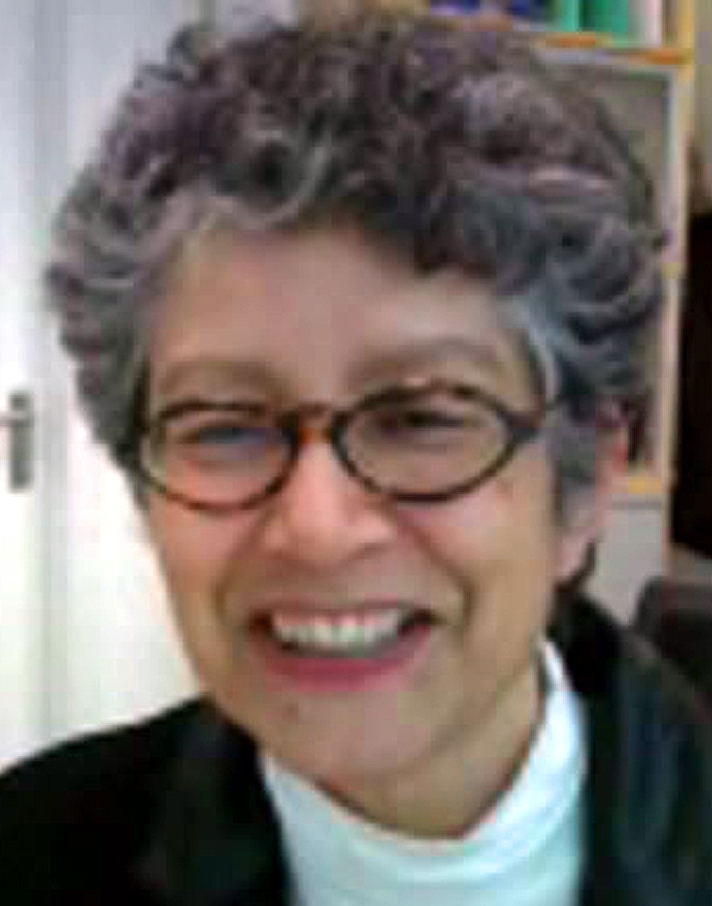
Denise P. Barlow

- 1 October
  - Bob Deacon, 73, social scientist.
  - Hugh Kearney, 93, historian.
  - István Mészáros, 86, Hungarian-born Marxist philosopher (Marx's Theory of Alienation, Socialism or Barbarism) and professor at the University of Sussex.
  - John Swinburne, 87, politician, founder of SSCUP and member of the Scottish Parliament (2003–2007).
- 3 October
  - Rodney Bickerstaffe, 72, trade unionist, General Secretary of UNISON (1996–2001).
  - Les Mutrie, 66, footballer (Hull City).
- 5 October
  - Trevor Martin, 87, actor (Doctor Who and the Daleks in the Seven Keys to Doomsday, Coronation Street, Z-Cars).
  - Peter Plouviez, 86, trade union leader, General Secretary of Equity (1974–1991).
  - Anna Stewart, 53, businesswoman, CEO of Laing O'Rourke (2013–2015) and non-executive director of Babcock International (from 2012).
- 6 October
  - Terry Downes, 81, boxer, world champion (1961–1962) and actor (The Fearless Vampire Killers, Caravaggio).
  - Lou Gare, 78, jazz saxophonist.
  - David Marks, 64, architect and entrepreneur (London Eye, British Airways i360 observation tower, Treetop Walkway at Kew Gardens).
  - Ian McNeill, 85, football player (Aberdeen) and manager (Ross County, Wigan Athletic).
  - Mary Moore, 87, author and diplomat.
- 8 October – Mark S. Joshi, 48, mathematician.
- 9 October
  - Gary Flather, 80, judge and disability rights campaigner.
  - Robin Ling, 90, orthopaedic surgeon.
  - Larry Paul, 65, boxer.
  - Jimmy Reid, 81, footballer (Dundee United).
- 10 October – Stack Stevens, 77, England international rugby union player.
- 11 October
  - Trevor Byfield, 73, actor (The Bill, Yesterday's Dreams, GoldenEye).
  - Dick Hewitt, 74, footballer (Barnsley, York City).
  - Sir Richard Swinburn, 79, lieutenant-general, Commander UK Field Army (1994–1995).
- 12 October – Simon Clarke, 79, rugby union player (England).
- 13 October
  - Betty Campbell, 82, Welsh community activist and school headteacher.
  - Iain Rogerson, 57, actor (Coronation Street).
- 14 October – Patrick Haslam, 69, racehorse trainer.
- 15 October
  - Peter James Scott Lumsden, 88, racing driver.
  - Sir Bert Massie, 68, disability rights campaigner, Chairman of Disability Rights Commission (2000–2007).
- 16 October
  - Kevin Cadle, 62, American-born basketball coach (Kingston Kings, Great Britain) and presenter (Sky Sports).
  - Roy Dotrice, 94, actor (Amadeus, A Moon for the Misbegotten).
  - Sean Hughes, 51, comedian (Never Mind the Buzzcocks, Sean's Show) and actor (The Last Detective).
  - Heather Slade-Lipkin, 70, pianist, harpsichordist and music teacher.
- 18 October – Phil Miller, 68, guitarist.
- 19 October
  - Ken Gowers, 81, rugby league player (Swinton, Great Britain).
  - Brian Riley, 80, footballer (Bolton Wanderers).
- 21 October
  - Denise P. Barlow, 69, geneticist.
  - Rosemary Leach, 81, actress (That'll Be the Day, A Room with a View, The Roads to Freedom, The Plague Dogs, My Family).
- 22 October – Patricia Llewellyn, 55, television producer (The Naked Chef, Ramsay's Kitchen Nightmares), BAFTA (2001, 2005, 2008) and Emmy winner (2006).
- 23 October
  - Anthony Hallam, 83, geologist.
  - Iona Opie, 94, folklorist.
- 24 October
  - Sir Peter Bairsto, 91, air marshal, Deputy Commander in Chief Strike Command (1981–1984).
  - Glenn Barr, 75, politician (UDA) and advocate, member of Northern Ireland Assembly and Constitutional Convention.
- 25 October
  - Peter MacGregor-Scott, 69, film producer (Batman Forever, The Fugitive, Still Smokin).
  - John Mollo, 86, costume designer (Star Wars, Alien, Gandhi), Oscar winner (1977, 1982).
  - Ben Shephard, 69, historian.
- 26 October
  - Sir Gavin Laird, 84, trade unionist.
  - Thomas Smales, 83, rugby league footballer (Great Britain) and coach (Castleford Tigers, Featherstone Rovers).
- 27 October
  - Peter Lawrenson, 84, electrical engineer.
  - David Shedden, 73, rugby union player (Scotland).
- 28 October
  - Yvonne Baseden, 95, French-born Special Operations Executive agent.
  - Roger Lockyer, 89, historian.
- 30 October
  - Candy Atherton, 62, politician, MP for Falmouth and Camborne (1997–2005).
  - Frank Doran, 68, politician, MP for Aberdeen South (1987–1992) and Aberdeen North (1997–2015).
  - Mary Reveley, 77, racehorse trainer.
- 31 October – Derek Robinson, 90, trade unionist.

=== November ===
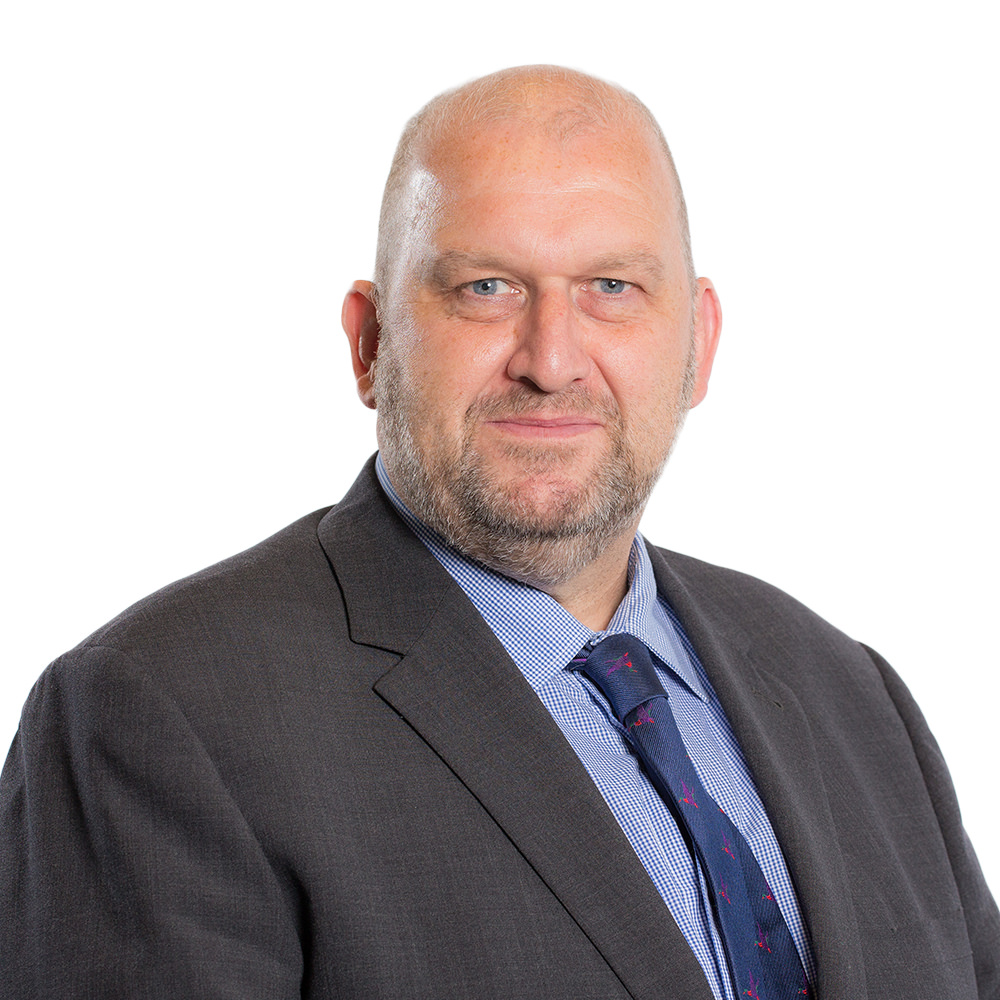
Carl Sargeant

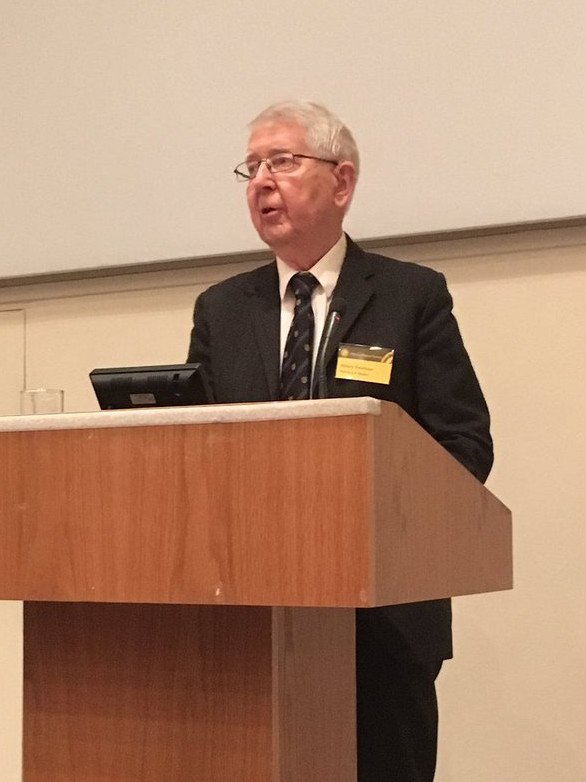
Henry Emeleus

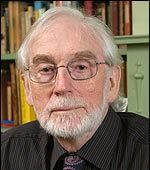
John Gordon

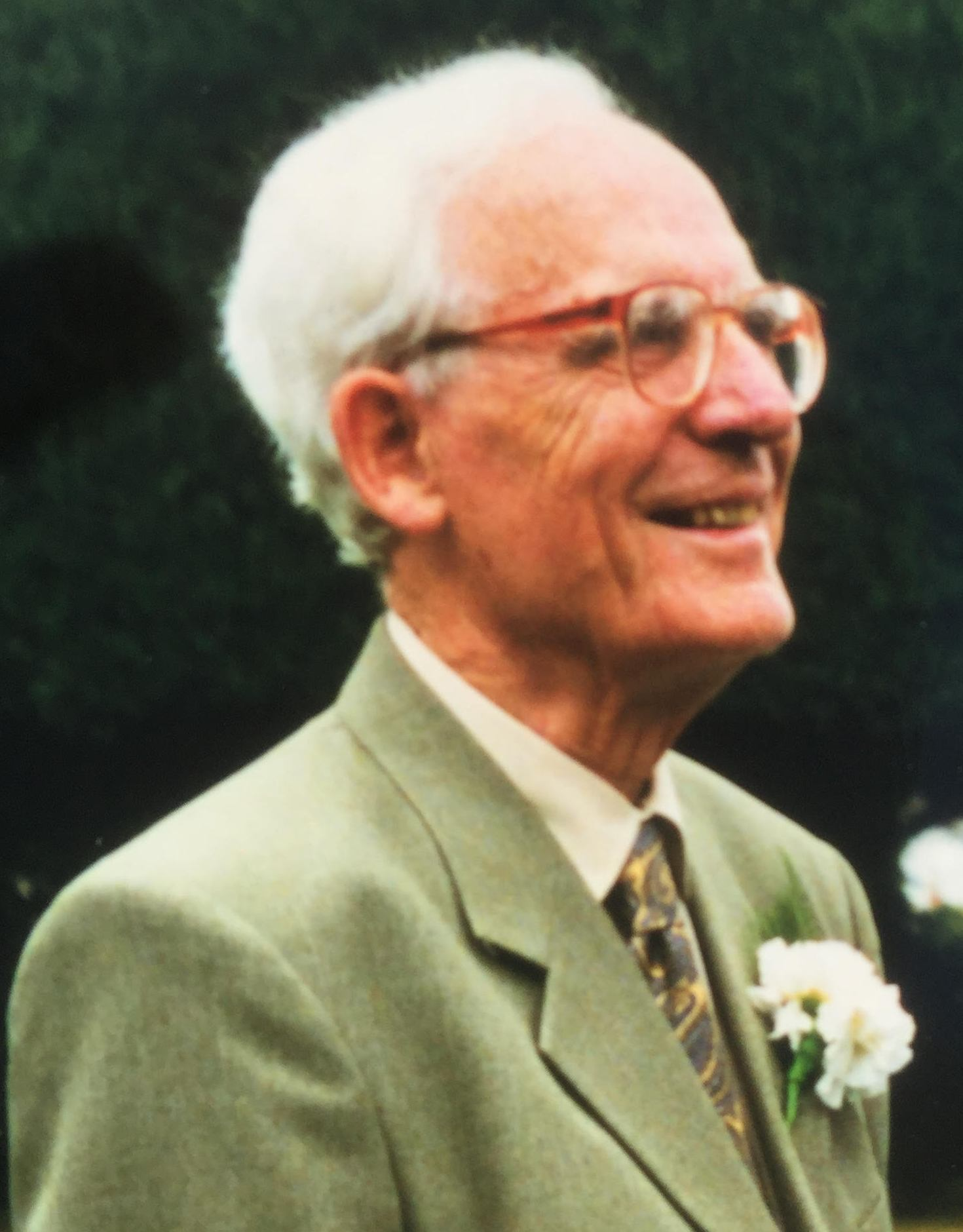
Harry Blamires

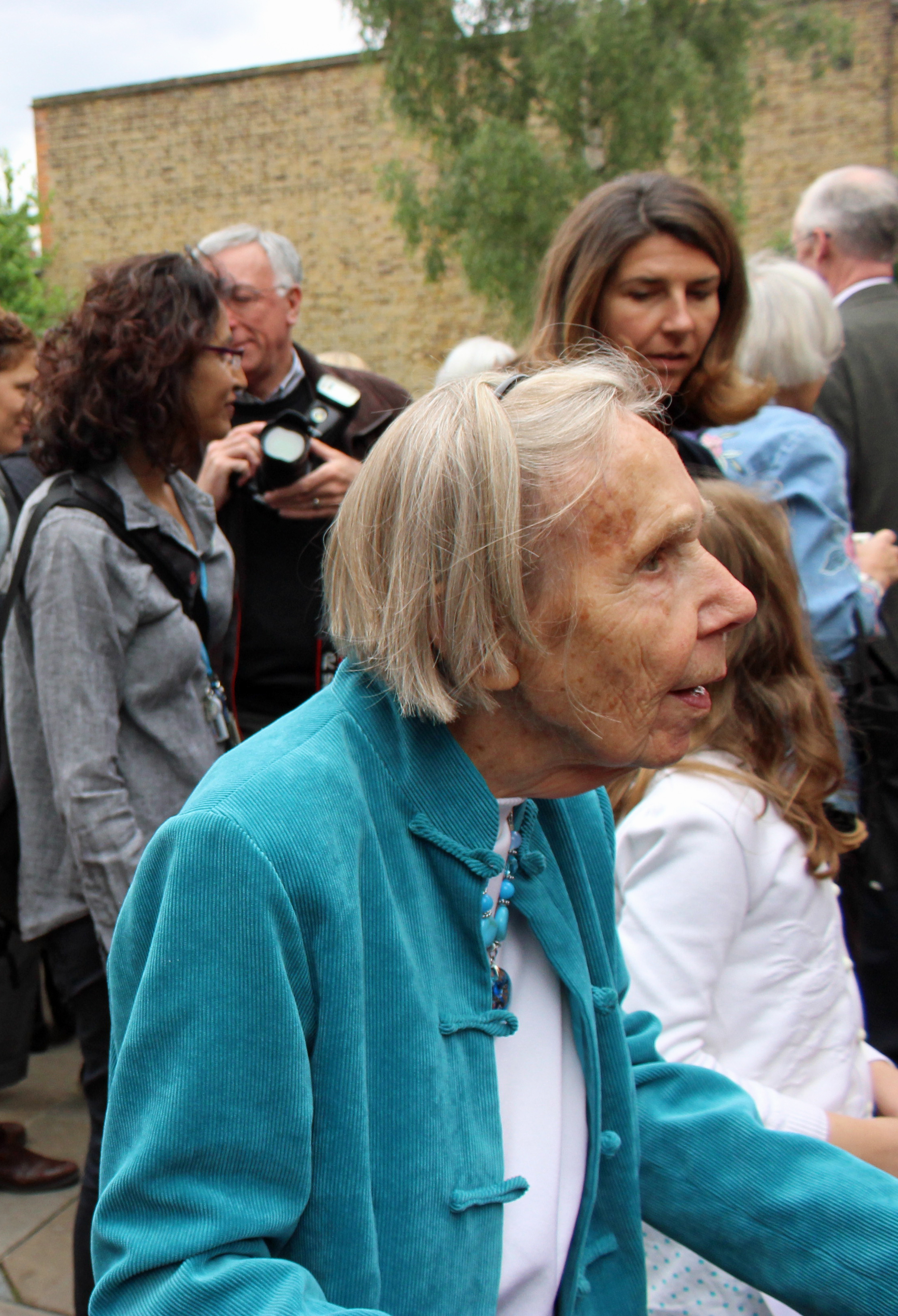
Mary Lee Woods

- 1 November – Eifion Evans, 86, church historian.
- 2 November
  - Lady Ursula d'Abo, 100, socialite.
  - Sir Michael Latham, 74, politician, MP for Melton (1974–1983) and Rutland and Melton (1983–1992).
  - Sarah Maguire, 60, poet and translator.
  - Paddy Russell, 89, television director (Doctor Who, Out of the Unknown, The Omega Factor).
- 3 November – Trevor Bell, 87, artist.
- 4 November – Derek Morgan, 88, cricketer (Derbyshire).
- 5 November
  - Robin Esser, 84, newspaper executive (Sunday Express, Daily Mail).
  - Helen John, 80, anti-war activist.
  - Sir Hugh Neill, 96, businessman and public servant.
- 6 November – Roger Becker, 83, tennis player.
- 7 November
  - Paul Buckmaster, 71, arranger (Elton John, The Rolling Stones) and composer, Grammy winner (2002).
  - Brian Perry, 74, cricketer (Shropshire).
  - Carl Sargeant, 49, politician.
- 8 November
  - Tim Gudgin, 87, radio presenter.
  - Pat Hutchins, 75, illustrator, author and actress (Rosie and Jim).
- 10 November
  - Duffy Ayers, 102, portrait painter.
  - Geoff Fletcher, 74, rugby league player (Leigh Centurions).
- 11 November – Henry Emeleus, 87, geologist.
- 12 November
  - Lady Cynthia Postan, 99, horticulturalist.
  - Geoffrey Alexander Rowley-Conwy, 9th Baron Langford, 105, Army officer and peer, longest-lived peer on record.
- 13 November
  - Jeremy Hutchinson, Baron Hutchinson of Lullington, 102, lawyer and life peer.
  - Peter Imbert, Baron Imbert, 84, police officer, Commissioner of the Metropolitan Police (1987–1992) and life peer.
- 14 November – Bill Cashmore, 56, actor (Brass Eye, Fist of Fun).
- 15 November
  - Jill Barklem, 66, writer and illustrator (Brambly Hedge).
  - Keith Barron, 83, actor (Duty Free, Upstairs, Downstairs, The Nigel Barton Plays).
  - Joy Lofthouse, 94, World War II pilot.
- 16 November
  - Tommy Farrer, 94, footballer (Bishop Auckland).
  - Jimmy Steele, 55, dentist.
- 17 November
  - Bill Pitt, 80, politician, MP for Croydon North West (1981–1983).
  - Les Tonks, 75, rugby league footballer of the 1960s and 1970s.
- 18 November
  - John Murray, 93, Olympic ice hockey player (1948).
  - Peter Spufford, 83, historian.
- 20 November
  - John Gordon, 92, author (The Giant Under The Snow).
  - Alan Walker, 79, paleoanthropologist, discoverer of The Black Skull.
- 21 November
  - Derek Barber, Baron Barber of Tewkesbury, 99, life peer, Member of the House of Lords (1992–2016).
  - Rodney Bewes, 79, actor (The Likely Lads, Whatever Happened to the Likely Lads?) and writer (Dear Mother...Love Albert).
  - Harry Blamires, 101, Anglican theologian, literary critic and novelist.
  - Milein Cosman, 96, German-born graphic artist.
  - Iola Gregory, 71, actress (Pobol y Cwm).
- 22 November – Bobi Jones, 88, author and academic.
- 23 November
  - Allan Harris, 74, footballer (Queens Park Rangers, Chelsea).
  - Anthony Harvey, 87, film director (The Lion in Winter) and editor (Dr. Strangelove, Lolita).
  - Manjit Wolstenholme, 53, businesswoman (Future Publishing, Unite Group, Provident Financial).
- 26 November – Mick Martyn, 81, rugby league player (Leigh Centurions).
- 27 November – Dermot Drummy, 56, football player (Blackpool, Arsenal) and coach (Chelsea Academy, Crawley Town).
- 28 November
  - Sir Peter Burt, 73, businessman, chief executive (1996–2001) and Governor (2001–2003) of the Bank of Scotland and chairman of ITV plc (2004–2007).
  - Jimmy McEwan, 88, footballer (Raith Rovers, Aston Villa).
  - Sir Martin Nourse, 85, jurist, Lord Justice of Appeal (1985–2001).
  - Johan Steyn, Baron Steyn, 85, South African-born jurist and life peer, Law Lord (1995–2005).
- 29 November – Mary Lee Woods, 93, English mathematician and computer programmer.
- 30 November
  - Terence Beesley, 60, actor (EastEnders, The Phantom of the Opera, War & Peace).
  - Russell Evans, 52, cricketer (Nottinghamshire).

=== December ===
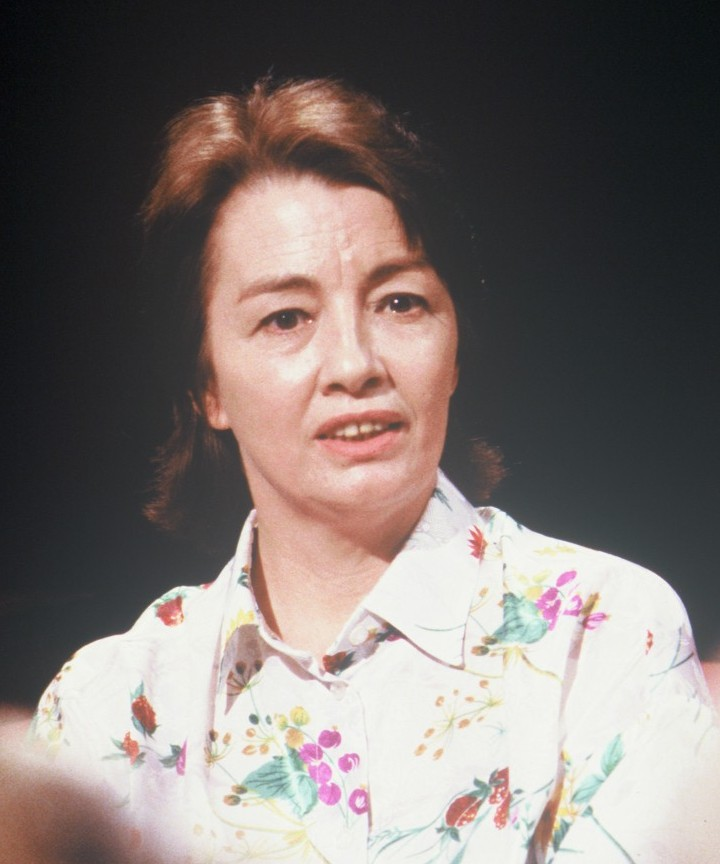
Christine Keeler

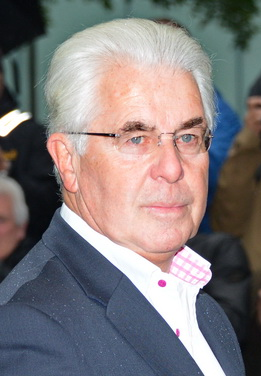
Max Clifford

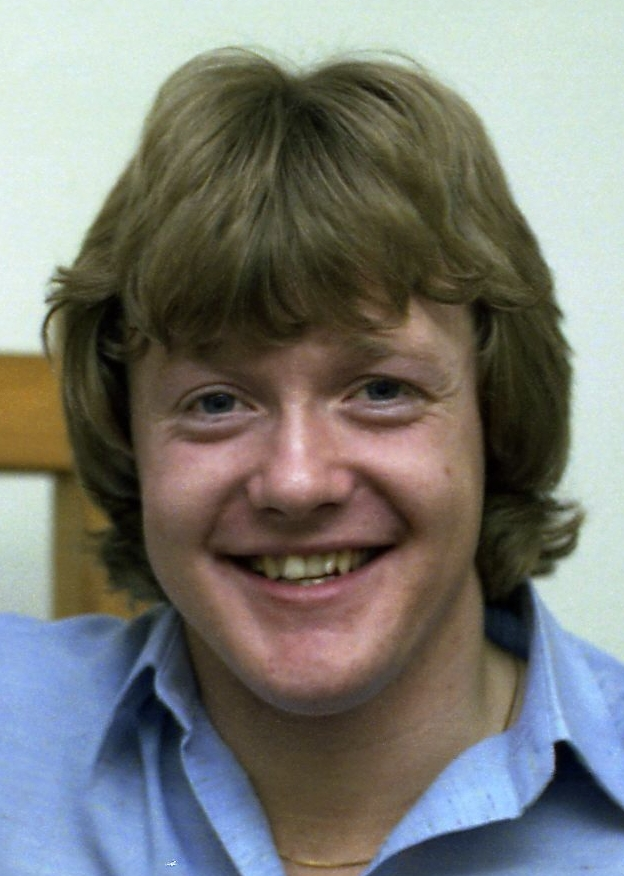
Keith Chegwin

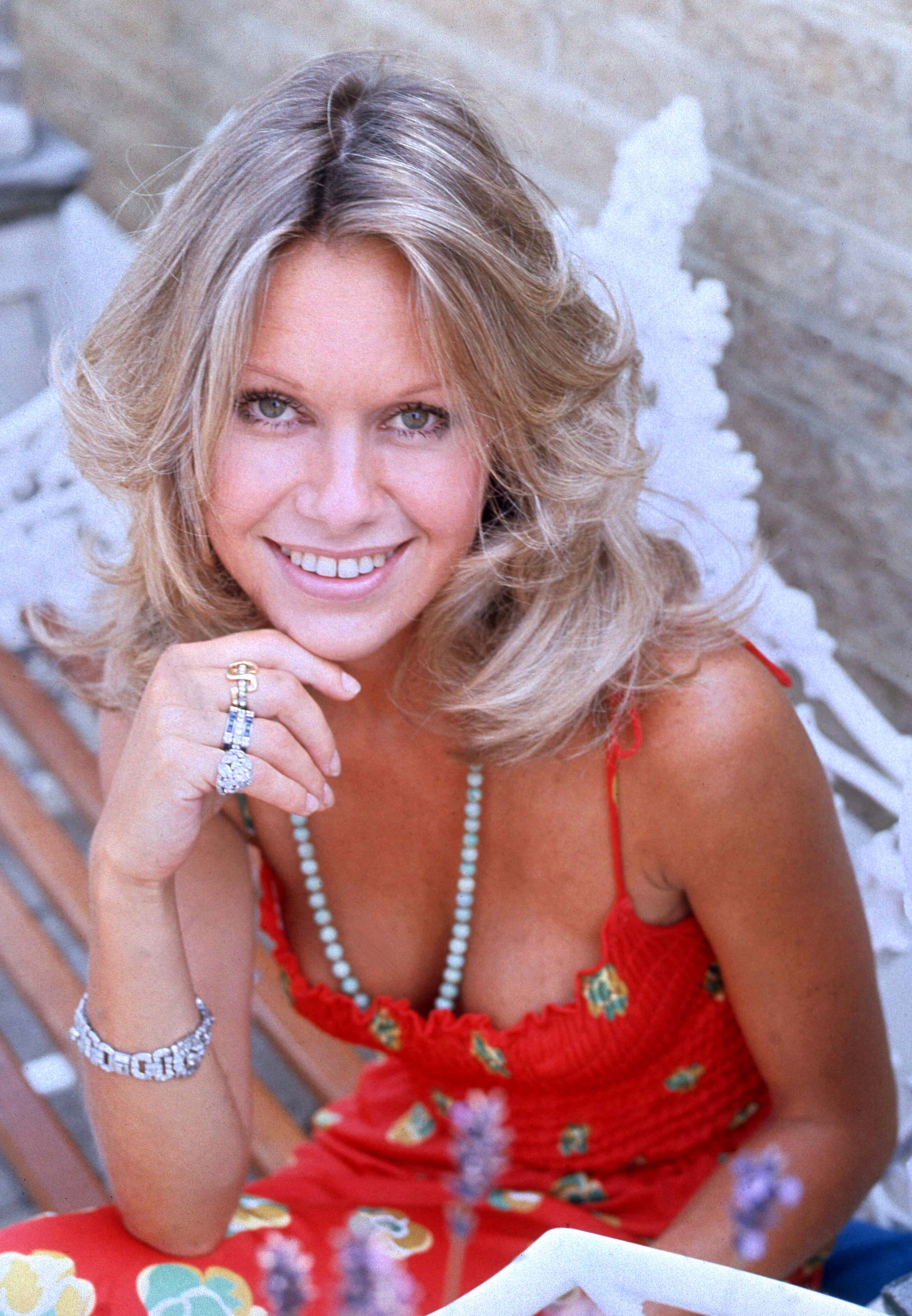
Suzanna Leigh

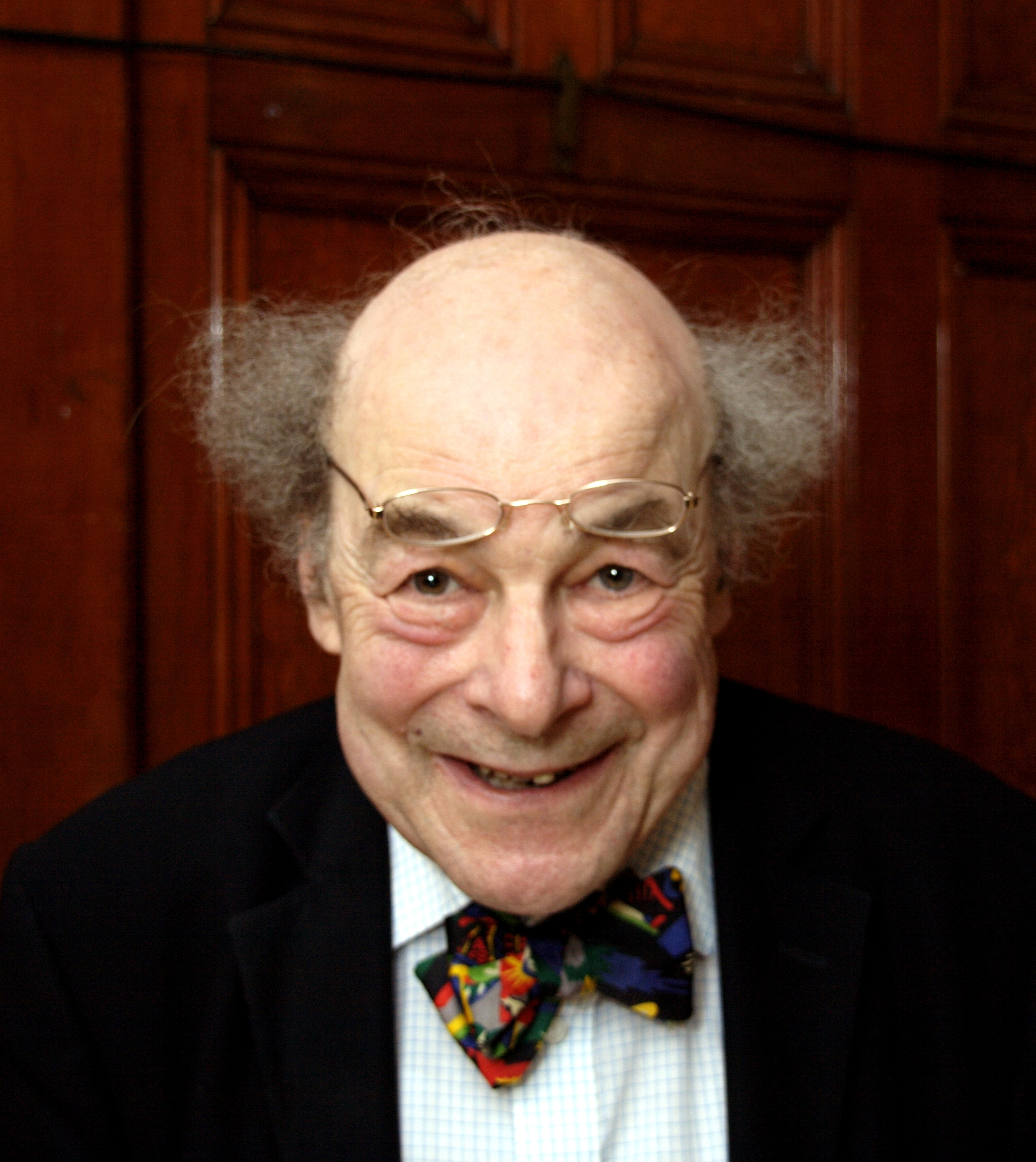
Heinz Wolff

- 2 December
  - Hugh Davies, 85, cricketer (Glamorgan).
  - Alan Sinfield, 76, literary critic.
- 3 December – Ian Twitchin, 65, footballer (Torquay United).
- 4 December
  - Alastair Bellingham, haematologist, President of the Royal College of Pathologists (1993–1996).
  - Jimmy Hood, 69, politician, MP for Clydesdale (1987–2005) and Lanark and Hamilton East (2005–2015).
  - Christine Keeler, 75, model and showgirl involved in the Profumo affair.
  - Annette Page, 84, ballerina.
- 5 December
  - Maureen Baker, 97, fashion designer.
  - Meic Povey, 67, actor and playwright (Pobol y Cwm).
  - Pamela Tudor-Craig, 89, art historian.
- 7 December
  - John Catt, 78, geologist and soil scientist.
  - Rodney Harris, 85, geneticist.
  - Tommy Horton, 76, golfer.
  - Peter Walwyn, 84, racehorse trainer.
- 8 December – Jack Hayward, 86, political scientist.
- 9 December – Damian Le Bas, 54, artist.
- 10 December
  - John Beer, 91, literary critic.
  - Max Clifford, 74, disgraced former publicist and convicted sex offender.
  - Collier Bay, 27, racehorse.
  - Arnold Maran, 80, surgeon, President of the Royal College of Surgeons of Edinburgh (1997–2000).
  - Toni Mascolo, 75, Italian-born hairdresser and businessman, co-founder of Toni & Guy.
- 11 December
  - Keith Chegwin, 60, television presenter (Cheggers Plays Pop, It's a Knockout) and actor (Macbeth).
  - Suzanna Leigh, 72, actress (Paradise, Hawaiian Style).
  - Sir Hereward Wake, 101, baronet and army officer.
- 12 December
  - Peter Duffell, 95, film and TV director (The House That Dripped Blood, England Made Me, Inside Out).
  - Bob Hale, 72, philosopher.
- 14 December – Michael Hirst, 84, art historian.
- 15 December
  - John Critchinson, 82, jazz pianist.
  - Heinz Wolff, 89, German-born scientist and television presenter (The Great Egg Race).
- 16 December – Sharon Laws, 43, racing cyclist.
- 18 December – Fritz Lustig, 98, German-born army intelligence officer.
- 19 December
  - Jon Oberlander, 55, cognitive scientist.
  - Sir Peter Terry, 91, Royal Air Force marshal and politician, Governor of Gibraltar (1985–1989).
- 20 December
  - Randolph Quirk, Baron Quirk, 97, linguist and life peer.
  - David Grant Walker, 94, historian.
- 21 December – Nicholas Rayner, 79, Army officer and auctioneer.
- 22 December
  - Cyril Beavon, 80, footballer (Oxford United).
  - Eric Moonman, 88, politician, MP for Billericay (1966–1970) and Basildon (1974–1979), and chairman of the Zionist Federation of Great Britain and Ireland (1975–1980).
- 23 December
  - John Atkinson, 71, rugby league player (Leeds Rhinos, England).
  - Mark Whittow, 60, archaeologist and Byzantinist.
- 24 December
  - Brian Jenkins, 74, swimmer, European championship silver medallist (1962).
  - Sir Brian Neill, 94, judge, Lord Justice of Appeal (1985–1996), President of the Court of Appeal for Gibraltar (1998–2003).
- 26 December
  - Willie Penman, 78, footballer (Newcastle United, Swindon Town, Walsall).
  - Steve Piper, 64, footballer (Brighton and Hove Albion, Portsmouth).
  - Francis Walmsley, 91, Roman Catholic prelate, Bishop of the Forces (1979–2002).
- 27 December – Bernard Gordon Lennox, 85, Army general, Commandant of the British Sector in Berlin (1983–1986).
- 28 December
  - Bronwen, Lady Astor, 87, model, psychotherapist and society figure.
  - John Faulkner, 69, footballer (Luton Town, Memphis Rogues, California Surf).
  - Francis Wyndham, 93, author, literary editor and journalist.
- 29 December – Jim Baikie, 77, comic book artist (Judge Dredd, Skizz, Jinty).
- 30 December – Gavin Stamp, 69, architectural historian.
- 31 December
  - Richard Cousins, 58, businessman and CEO (Compass Group).
  - Charles Alexander Ramsay, 81, Army officer.

== See also ==
- 2017 in British music
- 2017 in British radio
- 2017 in British television
- List of British films of 2017
