= Deaths in June 2017 =

The following is a list of notable deaths in June 2017.

Entries for each day are listed alphabetically by surname. A typical entry lists information in the following sequence:

- Name, age, country of citizenship at birth, subsequent country of citizenship (if applicable), what subject was noted for, cause of death (if known), and reference.

== June 2017 ==
=== 1 ===
- Ernie Ackerley, 73, British footballer (South Melbourne).
- George Badke, 71, American football player and coach.
- Roy Barraclough, 81, British comedian (Cissie and Ada) and actor (Coronation Street) respiratory problems.
- Donald Caird, 91, Irish Anglican prelate, Archbishop of Dublin (1985–1996).
- J. B. Dauda, 74, Sierra Leonean politician, MP for Kenema (1986–1992), Second Vice-President (1991–1992), and Minister of Foreign Affairs (2010–2012).
- Roberto De Vicenzo, 94, Argentine golfer, Open champion (1967).
- Tankred Dorst, 91, German playwright.
- Ludvig Hope Faye, 86, Norwegian politician.
- Viviane Gauthier, 99, Haitian dancer.
- José Greci, 76, Italian actress (Ben-Hur, The Ten Gladiators, The Sicilian Connection).
- Sir Owen Green, 92, British chief executive (BTR plc).
- George Joseph, 66, Indian diplomat, Ambassador to Turkmenistan (1997–2001), Qatar (2005–2009) and Bahrain (2009–2010), kidney disease.
- Jack McCloskey, 91, American basketball coach (Penn Quakers, Portland Trail Blazers) and executive (Detroit Pistons), complications from Alzheimer's disease.
- Alois Mock, 82, Austrian politician, Vice-Chancellor (1987–1989) and Foreign Minister (1987–1995), complications from Parkinson's disease.
- Ty Page, 59, American skateboarder, brain cancer.
- Charles Simmons, 92, American author.
- Sonja Sutter, 86, German actress (Derrick).
- Rosa Taikon, 90, Swedish silversmith and Romani people activist.
- Raino Westerholm, 97, Finnish politician.
- David Woods, 73, Australian Olympic water polo player (1972, 1976).

=== 2 ===
- Avie Bennett, 89, Canadian executive, Chancellor of York University (1998–2004).
- Gordon Christian, 89, American ice hockey player, Olympic silver medalist (1956).
- Saundra Edwards, 79, American actress and model.
- Walter Eggert, 76, German Olympic luger (1964).
- Iakovos Garmatis, 89, Greek-born American Orthodox hierarch, Metropolitan of Chicago (since 1997), complications from surgery.
- Ellen José, 66, Australian artist and photographer.
- Oskar Kaibyshev, 78, Russian scientist.
- Jaroslav Kořán, 77, Czech translator, writer and politician, Charter 77 signatory, Mayor of Prague (1990–1991).
- Leon Lemmens, 63, Belgian Roman Catholic prelate, Auxiliary Bishop of Mechelen-Brussels (since 2011), leukemia.
- Malcolm Lipkin, 85, English composer.
- Pierrino Mascarino, 77, Italian actor (Uncle Nino, Aaron's Way, Tears of the Sun).
- David Mattingley, 94, Australian WWII bomber pilot.
- Jack O'Neill, 94, American businessman (O'Neill).
- Barrie Pettman, 73, British author, publisher and philanthropist.
- Sharifuddin Pirzada, 93, Pakistani lawyer and politician, Minister of Foreign Affairs (1966–1968) and Attorney-General (1968–1971, 1977–1984).
- Charles V. Pyle Jr., 82, American judge and politician.
- S. Abdul Rahman, 79, Indian poet, urinary infection.
- Peter Sallis, 96, English actor (Last of the Summer Wine, Wallace and Gromit, The Wind in the Willows).
- Herm Starrette, 80, American baseball player (Baltimore Orioles).
- Sir Jeffrey Tate, 74, British conductor, heart attack.
- Tom Tjaarda, 82, American automobile designer.
- Sergei Vikharev, 55, Russian ballet dancer, blood clot.
- Ralph Wetton, 89, English footballer (Tottenham Hotspur, Plymouth Argyle).
- Stephen Williams, 90, American archaeologist.
- Aamir Zaki, 49, Pakistani guitarist, heart failure.

=== 3 ===
- Clifford Blackburn, 89, Canadian Olympic boxer.
- Andrew Chambers, 85, American lieutenant general.
- David Choby, 70, American Roman Catholic prelate, Bishop of Nashville (since 2005), complications from a fall.
- Ignacio Echeverría, 39, Spanish banker, stabbed.
- Sara Ehrman, 98, American political lobbyist and Jewish activist, endocarditis.
- Stefan Gryff, 79, Polish-born Australian actor (Julia, Surviving Picasso, The Saint).
- Jack Klemens, 95, American ice hockey player and coach.
- James E. Martin, 84, American educator, president of the University of Arkansas (1980–1984) and Auburn University (1984–1992).
- Niels Helveg Petersen, 78, Danish politician, Minister of Foreign Affairs (1993–2000), MP (1966–1974, 1977–1993, 1994–2011), esophageal cancer.
- Jimmy Piersall, 87, American baseball player (Boston Red Sox, Cleveland Indians) and broadcaster.
- Rehman Rashid, 62, Malaysian journalist (New Straits Times, Asiaweek).
- James M. Seely, 84, American rear admiral.
- Shivraj, 96, Indian actor (Patita, Seema, Miss Mary).
- Eleanor Singer, 87, Austrian-born American expert on survey methodology.
- Vincent Tshabalala, 75, South African golfer.
- John K. Watts, 80, Australian football player (East Perth) and broadcaster.
- Lawrence Weed, 93, American medical researcher.

=== 4 ===
- Esmé Berman, 88, South African art historian, Parkinson's disease.
- Bill Butler, 83, British film editor (A Clockwork Orange, A Touch of Class).
- Danny Dias, 34, American reality television personality (Road Rules, The Challenge), complications from chronic substance abuse.
- Orlando Figuera, 22, Venezuelan young man, killed during the 2017 Venezuelan protests.
- Juan Goytisolo, 86, Spanish essayist, poet and novelist.
- Bennie Hofs, 70, Dutch footballer (Vitesse).
- Patrick G. Johnston, 58, Northern Irish scientist and academic administrator, Vice-Chancellor of Queen's University, Belfast (2014–2017).
- Robert L. Kistler, 92, American politician.
- Arthur Mather, 91, Australian cartoonist (Captain Atom).
- David Nicholls, 61, British jockey and horse trainer.
- Babatunde Osotimehin, 68, Nigerian politician and civil servant, executive director of the United Nations Population Fund (since 2011).
- Thomas C. Perry, 76, American politician, Mayor of Akron, New York (1987–1991).
- Washington Sixolo, 83, South African actor (Emzini Wezinsizwa, Shaka Zulu, Who Am I?).
- Roger Smith, 84, American actor (77 Sunset Strip, Mister Roberts, Auntie Mame), complications from Parkinson's disease.
- Ravi Subramanian, 51, Indian cricket umpire.
- Merle Tingley, 95, Canadian cartoonist.
- Jack Trout, 82, American marketer and author, intestinal cancer.
- Zhang Tianfu, 106, Chinese agronomist and tea expert.

=== 5 ===
- Annette Barbier, 66, American artist, complications from a bone marrow disorder.
- Kay Byer, 72, American poet, North Carolina Poet Laureate (2005–2009), lymphoma.
- Marco Coll, 81, Colombian footballer (América de Cali).
- Ivy Cooke, 100, Jamaican educator.
- Andy Cunningham, 67, British magician, puppeteer and actor (Bodger & Badger), cancer.
- Helen Dunmore, 64, British poet and writer (Zennor in Darkness), cancer.
- Victor Gold, 88, American journalist and White House press secretary.
- Marilyn Hall, 90, Canadian-born American television producer (A Woman Called Golda).
- Anna Jókai, 84, Hungarian writer.
- William Krisel, 92, Chinese-born American architect.
- Georgios Masadis, 72, Greek footballer (Veria F.C.).
- Rita Riggs, 86, American costume designer (Psycho, All in the Family, The Birds).
- Giuliano Sarti, 83, Italian footballer (Fiorentina, Inter).
- N. S. Ramanuja Tatacharya, 90, Indian academic.
- Cheick Tioté, 30, Ivorian footballer (Twente, Newcastle United, national team), heart attack.
- Ted Topor, 87, American football player (Detroit Lions).
- Ruth Tunstall-Grant, 72, American artist, pulmonary hypertension.
- James Vance, 64, American comic book writer (Kings in Disguise, Omaha the Cat Dancer, The Crow), cancer.
- Héctor Wagner, 48, Dominican baseball player (Kansas City Royals), stomach cancer.

=== 6 ===
- Bob Bartels, 88, American swimming coach.
- John Bower, 87, American Nordic combined skier.
- Horace Burrell, 67, Jamaican soccer executive, President of the Jamaica Football Federation (since 2007), cancer.
- Osvaldo Codaro, 87, Argentine Olympic water polo player.
- Jean-Jacques Delvaux, 74, French politician, cancer.
- Ainslie Embree, 96, American historian.
- Andrew Francis, 70, Pakistani Roman Catholic prelate, Bishop of Multan (1999–2014).
- Vin Garbutt, 69, British folk singer (When the Tide Turns, Bandalised, Word of Mouth), complications from heart surgery.
- Tony Grubb, 80, English golfer.
- Ragnhild Queseth Haarstad, 78, Norwegian politician.
- François Houtart, 92, Belgian theologian.
- Adnan Khashoggi, 81, Saudi arms dealer.
- Davey Lambert, 48, English motorcycle racer, injuries sustained in crash.
- Georgie Leahy, 78, Irish hurling coach (Kilkenny).
- Earl Lestz, 78, American studio executive (Paramount Pictures), heart attack.
- Lee Maynard, 80, American novelist.
- Bruce McMaster-Smith, 77, Australian football player.
- Walter Noll, 92, German-born American mathematician.
- Peter Norburn, 86, English rugby league footballer.
- Latifur Rahman, 81, Bangladeshi justice, Chief Justice (2000–2001) and Chief Adviser (2001).
- Sandra Reemer, 66, Dutch singer ("Als het om de liefde gaat", "Colorado", "The Party's Over"), breast cancer.
- Márta Rudas, 80, Hungarian javelin thrower, Olympic silver medalist (1964).
- Hansruedi Schneider, 90, Swiss Olympic sport shooter.
- Era Sezhiyan, 94, Indian writer and politician.
- Keiichi Tahara, 65, Japanese photographer.
- Jimmy Thomas, 69, American football player (San Francisco 49ers).
- Bill Walker, 88, Scottish politician, MP for Perth and East Perthshire (1979–1983) and North Tayside (1983–1997).
- Rokas Žilinskas, 44, Lithuanian journalist and politician, pneumonia.
- Paul Zukofsky, 73, American violinist and conductor, non-Hodgkin lymphoma.

=== 7 ===
- Angela Hartley Brodie, 82, British cancer researcher.
- Irene Brown, 98, British author and codebreaker.
- Arthur Bunting, 80, English rugby league player and coach (Hull Kingston Rovers, Hull F.C.).
- Ernie Edds, 91, English footballer (Plymouth Argyle, Torquay United).
- Cyril Frankel, 95, British film director (Make Me an Offer, On the Fiddle, The Witches).
- Michael Francis Gibson, 87, Belgian-born French art critic and writer.
- James Hardy, 31, American football player (Buffalo Bills, Baltimore Ravens), suicide by drowning. (body discovered on this date)
- Jan Høiland, 78, Norwegian singer.
- Holy Bull, 26, American Thoroughbred racehorse, 1994 American Horse of the Year, euthanized.
- Wesley E. Lanyon, 90, American ornithologist.
- Robert S. Leiken, 78, American political scientist and historian.
- Trento Longaretti, 100, Italian painter.
- Françoise Mailliard, 87, French Olympic fencer (1960).
- Charles-Eugène Marin, 91, Canadian politician, MP (1984–1993).
- Hayden Morgan, 83, American politician.
- Tom Poole, 81, British barrister.
- Eero Rislakki, 92, Finnish industrial engineer.
- France Rode, 82, Slovenian engineer, inventor of the scientific pocket calculator.
- Deo Rwabiita, 74, Ugandan politician and diplomat.
- Patsy Terrell, 55, American politician, member of the Kansas House of Representatives (since 2017).
- Ed Victor, 77, American-born British literary agent, heart attack.
- Ron Warzeka, 81, American football player (Oakland Raiders).
- Thierry Zéno, 67, Belgian writer and filmmaker, cancer.

=== 8 ===
- Miguel d'Escoto Brockmann, 84, Nicaraguan diplomat, politician and priest, Foreign Minister of Nicaragua (1979–1990) and President of the United Nations General Assembly (2008–2009).
- Fred Fiedler, 95, Austrian-born American psychologist.
- LeRoy Fjordbotten, 78, Canadian politician, MLA of Alberta (1979–1993).
- Ervin A. Gonzalez, 57, American attorney, suicide.
- Marcelo Guinle, 69, Argentine politician, Senator from Chubut Province (2001–2015).
- Václav Halama, 76, Czech football player and coach.
- Glenne Headly, 62, American actress (Dirty Rotten Scoundrels, Mr. Holland's Opus, Dick Tracy), complications from pulmonary embolism.
- Naseem Khan, 77, British journalist (Time Out, The Guardian).
- Jack Charles Klein, 81, Canadian politician.
- Zoya Krylova, 73, Russian journalist and politician.
- Sergo Kutivadze, 72, Georgian football player and coach (FC Dinamo Tbilisi, Torpedo Kutaisi).
- Robert Melson, 46, American murderer, executed by lethal injection.
- René Monse, 48, German Olympic heavyweight boxer (1996).
- Jan Notermans, 84, Dutch footballer (Fortuna Sittard, national team).
- Sam Panopoulos, 82, Greek-born Canadian cook, inventor of the Hawaiian pizza.
- Jill Singer, 60, Australian journalist (ABC, Seven, Herald Sun), AL amyloidosis.
- Ron Starr, 66, American professional wrestler (NJPW).
- Sir Bernard Tomlinson, 96, English neuropathologist.
- Norro Wilson, 79, American country music songwriter ("A Very Special Love Song", "The Most Beautiful Girl") and record producer, Grammy winner (1975), heart failure.
- Prince Udaya Priyantha, 48, Sri Lankan artist and singer, complications from a brain infection.

=== 9 ===
- Gazi Shahabuddin Ahmed, 78, Bangladeshi journalist, cancer.
- Natig Aliyev, 69, Azerbaijani politician, Minister of Energy (since 2004), complications from a heart attack.
- Ahmoo Angeconeb, 62, Canadian Ojibwe artist, heart attack.
- Andrzej Baturo, 77, Polish photographer.
- Edit DeAk, 68, Hungarian-born American art critic and writer, pneumonia and respiratory stress syndrome.
- Vic Edelbrock Jr., 80, American automotive products manufacturer (Edelbrock).
- Patricia Goldsmith, 88, English artist.
- John Heyman, 84, British-American film producer (D.A.R.Y.L.).
- Romualda Hofertienė, 75, Lithuanian politician.
- Lady Mary Holborow, 80, British magistrate, Lord Lieutenant of Cornwall (1994–2011).
- Ewald Janusz, 76, Polish Olympic sprint canoer (1968).
- Frank A. Jenssen, 65, Norwegian writer and photographer.
- S. S. Khaplang, 77, Burmese politician.
- John Liu Shi-gong, 88, Chinese clandestine Roman Catholic prelate, Bishop of Jining (since 1995).
- Palvai Govardhan Reddy, 80, Indian politician, heart attack.
- Grace Berg Schaible, 91, American lawyer and politician, Alaska Attorney General (1987–1989).
- Andimba Toivo ya Toivo, 92, Namibian anti-apartheid activist, politician and political prisoner (SWAPO).
- García Verdugo, 83, Spanish football player (Xerez CD, Real Valladolid) and manager (CD Tenerife, CA Osasuna).
- Adam West, 88, American actor (Batman, Family Guy, Robinson Crusoe on Mars), leukemia.
- Sheila Willcox, 81, British equestrian, European champion (1957).
- John C. Yoder, 66, American judge and politician, member of the West Virginia Senate (1992–1996, 2004–2008), complications of heart surgery.

=== 10 ===
- Abu Khattab al-Tunisi, Tunisian jihadist, shot.
- Ray J. Ceresa, 83, British philatelist.
- Chi Po-lin, 52, Taiwanese aerial photographer and director (Beyond Beauty: Taiwan from Above), helicopter crash.
- Alexander M. Cruickshank, 97, American chemist.
- Austin Deasy, 80, Irish politician, TD (1977–2002) and Minister of Agriculture (1982–1987).
- Helen Freedhoff, 77, Canadian theoretical physicist.
- Peter Hocken, 84, British theologian and historian.
- John R. Holman, 67, British philatelist.
- Herma Hill Kay, 82, American legal scholar.
- Arvo Kyllönen, 84, Finnish Olympic wrestler.
- Clive M. Law, 63, British-born Canadian publisher and author.
- Malang, 89, Filipino cartoonist, illustrator and painter.
- Oscar Mammì, 90, Italian politician, Minister of Mail and Telecommunications (1987–1991).
- Mihai Nedef, 85, Romanian Olympic basketball player (1952).
- Jerry Nelson, 73, American astronomer.
- Julia Perez, 36, Indonesian actress, cervical cancer.
- Owen W. Roberts, 93, American diplomat.
- Samuel V. Wilson, 93, American army lieutenant general, Director of the Defense Intelligence Agency (1976–1977).

=== 11 ===
- Alan Campbell, 67, Northern Irish Pentecostal pastor and author.
- Errol Christie, 53, British boxer, lung cancer.
- Herman T. Costello, 96, American politician, member of the New Jersey General Assembly (1976–1982) and Senate (1982–1984).
- Alice Dewey, 89, American anthropologist.
- Ray Franklin, 83, American major general.
- John Friedmann, 91, Austrian-born American academic.
- David Fromkin, 84, American historian.
- Jim Graham, 71, American politician, member of the Council of the District of Columbia (1999–2015), complications from an infection.
- Nigel Grainge, 70, British music industry executive (Ensign Records).
- Alexandra Kluge, 80, German actress and physician.
- Lois McIvor, 86, New Zealand artist.
- Norman Pollack, 84, American historian, cancer.
- S. R. Ramchandra Rao, 85, Indian cricket umpire.
- Ragnar Rommetveit, 92, Norwegian psychologist.
- Geoffrey Rowell, 74, British Anglican prelate, Bishop of Basingstoke (1994–2001) and Europe (2001–2013).
- Clive Rushton, 69, British Olympic swimmer (1972) and swimming coach, cancer.
- Elaine Schreiber, 78, Australian Paralympic athlete.
- Rosalie Sorrels, 83, American folk singer.
- Corneliu Stroe, 67, Romanian drummer and percussionist, heart attack.

=== 12 ===
- Teresa Albuquerque, 87, Indian historian.
- Piotr Andrejew, 69, Polish film director (Shadow Man).
- Myron Atkinson, 89, American politician, member of the North Dakota House of Representatives (1969–1976).
- Sam Beazley, 101, British actor (Harry Potter and the Order of the Phoenix, Johnny English, Pride and Prejudice).
- Brian Bellhouse, 80, British academic, engineer and entrepreneur, trampled.
- Theodor Bergmann, 101, German agronomist.
- Joan Bicknell, 78, English psychiatrist.
- Marike Bok, 74, Dutch portrait painter.
- Robert Campeau, 93, Canadian financier and real estate developer.
- Vinod Chohan, 68, Tanzanian particle accelerator specialist and engineer.
- Morton N. Cohen, 96, American author and scholar.
- Clifford John Earle Jr., 81, American mathematician.
- David W. Frank, 67, American actor, author and educator, complications from cancer.
- Jim Galton, 92, American businessman, CEO of Marvel Entertainment Group.
- Philip Gossett, 75, American musicologist.
- Gheorghe Gușet, 49, Romanian shot putter, competed in 1992, 2000, and 2004 Olympics, aortic dissection.
- Jagjeet Singh Kular, 75, Kenyan Olympic hockey player (1972).
- Fernando Martínez Heredia, 78, Cuban revolutionary and politician.
- Masahide Ōta, 92, Japanese historian and politician, Governor of Okinawa Prefecture (1990–1998), pneumonia and respiratory failure.
- Frank Pecora, 86, American politician, member of the Pennsylvania Senate for the 44th District (1979–1994).
- Pessalli, 26, Brazilian footballer (Grêmio, Angers, Paraná), traffic collision.
- C. Narayana Reddy, 85, Indian writer and poet, recipient of the Jnanpith Award (1988).
- Frans Ronnes, 68, Dutch politician, Mayor of Haaren (2001–2013).
- David Shentow, 92, Belgian-born Canadian Holocaust survivor.
- Marvin Herman Shoob, 94, American federal judge, U.S. District Court for the Northern District of Georgia (1979–1991).
- Brian Taylor, 84, English cricketer (Essex).
- Charles P. Thacker, 74, American computer designer, co-inventor of Ethernet, complications from esophageal cancer.
- Karl-Heinz Weigang, 81, German football coach, heart attack.
- Donald Winch, 82, British economist and academic.
- Bob Zick, 90, American baseball player (Chicago Cubs).

=== 13 ===
- Jeffrey Arenburg, 60, Canadian killer, heart attack.
- Richard Farson, 90, American behavioral psychologist, author, and educator.
- A. R. Gurney, 86, American playwright (The Dining Room, Love Letters).
- Hansel, 29, American racehorse, winner of the 1991 Preakness Stakes and Belmont Stakes, euthanized.
- Richard Long, 4th Viscount Long, 88, British politician and aristocrat.
- Patricia Knatchbull, 2nd Countess Mountbatten of Burma, 93, British peeress.
- Lee Murchison, 79, American football player (San Francisco 49ers, Dallas Cowboys), complications from a fall.
- Yōko Nogiwa, 81, Japanese actress (Yakuza Deka, Key Hunter, Minna no Ie).
- José Odon Maia Alencar, 88, Brazilian politician, Governor of Piauí (1966), Mayor of Pio IX (1959–1962).
- Jack Ong, 76, American actor (Next, Leprechaun in the Hood, General Hospital), brain tumor.
- Ootje Oxenaar, 87, Dutch graphic artist and banknote designer.
- Anita Pallenberg, 75, Italian actress (Barbarella, Performance, A Degree of Murder), hepatitis.
- Pierre Papillaud, 81, French businessman.
- Zahir Shah, 70, Pakistani actor.
- Ulf Stark, 72, Swedish author (Can You Whistle, Johanna?), cancer.
- Rick Tuten, 52, American football player (Seattle Seahawks).

=== 14 ===
- Raziel Abelson, 95, American philosopher.
- Luis Abanto Morales, 93, Peruvian singer and composer.
- June Blum, 87, American artist.
- Fred Cogley, 82, Irish sports broadcaster.
- Lynn Conkwright, 63, American bodybuilder.
- Jacques Foix, 86, French footballer.
- Ann Louise Gilligan, 71, Irish feminist theologian, complications from a brain haemorrhage.
- Rob Gonsalves, 57, Canadian painter and illustrator.
- Ernestina Herrera de Noble, 92, Argentine newspaper publisher (Clarín).
- Arthur J. Jackson, 92, American military officer, Medal of Honor recipient.
- Kuriakose Kunnacherry, 88, Indian Syro-Malabar hierarch, Archbishop of Kottayam (1974–2006).
- Don Matthews, 77, American-Canadian football coach (BC Lions, Toronto Argonauts, Edmonton Eskimos), cancer.
- Anna Pellissier, 90, Italian Olympic alpine skier.
- Khadija Saye, 24, British photographer, injuries sustained in the Grenfell Tower fire.
- Hein Verbruggen, 75, Dutch sports administrator, President of the UCI (1991–2005), leukemia.
- Davis Wolfgang Hawke, 38, American neo-Nazi and spammer, gunshot wounds.

=== 15 ===
- Ibrahim Abouleish, 80, Egyptian pharmacologist and biodynamic agriculturalist (SEKEM).
- Martin Aitken, 95, British archaeometrist.
- David L. Armstrong, 75, American politician, Mayor of Louisville (1999–2003).
- Ajmer Singh Aulakh, 74, Indian playwright, cancer.
- Aleksey Batalov, 88, Russian actor (The Cranes Are Flying, The Lady with the Dog, Moscow Does Not Believe in Tears), complications from a fall.
- P. N. Bhagwati, 95, Indian judge, Chief Justice (1985–1986), acting Governor of Gujarat (1967, 1973).
- Jacques Charpentier, 83, French composer and organist.
- John Dalmas, 90, American science fiction writer, pneumonia.
- Bill Dana, 92, American comedian, actor and screenwriter (The Bill Dana Show, The Ed Sullivan Show, The Nude Bomb).
- Wilma de Faria, 72, Brazilian politician, Governor of Rio Grande do Norte (2003–2010), cancer.
- Evelyn Freeman Roberts, 98, American musician, songwriter and educator.
- Kyla Greenbaum, 95, British pianist.
- Stina Haage, 92, Swedish Olympic gymnast (1948).
- Larry Hayes, 81, American football player (Los Angeles Rams).
- Jim Hendrick, 82, American sports announcer.
- Phyllis A. Kravitch, 96, American judge, U.S. Court of Appeals for the Fifth Circuit (1979–1981) and Eleventh Circuit (1981–1996).
- Barbara Kulaszka, 64, Canadian lawyer, lung cancer.
- Kalamandalam Leelamma, 65, Indian classical dancer.
- James W. McCord Jr., 93, American intelligence officer, pancreatic cancer.
- Dame Ngāneko Minhinnick, 77, New Zealand Māori leader (Ngāti Te Ata).
- Rumen Nenov, 47, Bulgarian footballer.
- Harry Prime, 97, American big band singer.
- Danny Schock, 68, Canadian ice hockey player (Boston Bruins, Philadelphia Flyers).
- Olbram Zoubek, 91, Czech sculptor.

=== 16 ===
- John G. Avildsen, 81, American film director (Rocky, The Karate Kid, Save the Tiger), Oscar winner (1977), pancreatic cancer.
- Christian Cabrol, 91, French cardiac surgeon and politician, MEP (1994–1999).
- Héctor Cardona, 81, Puerto Rican sports executive, president of Puerto Rico Olympic Committee (1991–2008), executive vice-president of International Amateur Boxing Association, cancer.
- Eliza Clívia, 37, Brazilian singer, traffic collision.
- Jim French, 84, American photographer
- Luciano Frosini, 89, Italian racing cyclist.
- Stephen Furst, 63, American actor (Babylon 5, Animal House, St. Elsewhere), complications from diabetes.
- Leon Garror, 69, American football player (Buffalo Bills).
- Curt Hanson, 73, American politician, member of the Iowa House of Representatives (since 2009), cancer.
- Joan Hohl, 82, American author.
- Mieczysław Kalenik, 84, Polish actor (Krzyżacy).
- Edzai Kasinauyo, 42, Zimbabwean footballer (CAPS United, Moroka Swallows).
- Helmut Kohl, 87, German politician, Chancellor (1982–1998), Minister-President of Rhineland-Palatinate (1969–1976).
- Maurice Mességué, 95, French herbalist.
- Ren Rong, 99, Chinese politician, Communist Party Chief of Tibet Autonomous Region (1971–1980).
- Cheryl Rubenberg, 71, American writer and academic.
- Jerry Selinger, 81, Canadian football player (Ottawa Rough Riders).
- Günter Siebert, 86, German football player and executive, West German Champion (1958) and chairman (Schalke).
- Hans Olav Tungesvik, 81, Norwegian politician, MP (1977–1985), traffic collision.
- Dick Warner, 70, Irish journalist (RTÉ) and environmentalist.

=== 17 ===
- Rodolfo Fontiveros Beltran, 68, Filipino Roman Catholic prelate, Vicar Apostolic of Bontoc-Lagawe (2006–2012) and Bishop of San Fernando de La Union (since 2012).
- Elias Burstein, 99, American physicist.
- Gail Burwen, 71, American illustrator, traffic collision.
- Ken Campbell, 89, Australian paleontologist.
- Gailanne Cariddi, 63, American politician, member of the Massachusetts House of Representatives (since 2011).
- Hugo Casey, 77, Irish Gaelic footballer.
- Diana Cavallo, 85, American author.
- Iván Fandiño, 36, Spanish bullfighter, gored.
- Larry Grantham, 78, American football player (New York Jets).
- Józef Grudzień, 78, Polish lightweight boxer, Olympic champion (1964) and silver medalist (1968).
- Pierre Imhasly, 77, Swiss author and poet, cancer.
- Henk van Rossum, 97, Dutch politician, member of the House of Representatives (1967–1986).
- Baldwin Lonsdale, 68, ni-Vanuatu politician, President (since 2014), heart attack.
- Luis Lusquiños, 65, Argentine politician, member of the Chamber of Deputies (2005–2009), Chief of the Cabinet of Ministers (2001).
- William S. Massey, 96, American mathematician.
- Thara Memory, 68, American jazz trumpeter, Grammy winner (2013).
- Omar Monza, 88, Argentine Olympic basketball player (1952), world champion (1950).
- Frederick P. Nickles, 69, American politician.
- Venus Ramey, 92, American beauty pageant contestant (Miss America 1944) and gun rights activist.
- Leopoldo S. Tumulak, 72, Filipino Roman Catholic prelate, Bishop of Tagbilaran (1992–2005) and Military Ordinary of the Philippines (since 2005), pancreatic cancer.
- Anneliese Uhlig, 98, German actress (Don Cesare di Bazan).
- Buddy Wayne, 50, American professional wrestler (WWE, WCW), heart attack.
- Emil Wojtaszek, 89, Polish politician, Minister of Foreign Affairs (1976–1980).

=== 18 ===
- Atmasthananda, 98, Indian Hindu leader, president of Ramakrishna Math (since 2007).
- Octavio Betancourt Arango, 89, Colombian Roman Catholic prelate, Bishop of Garzón (1975–1977).
- Hans Breder, 81, German-born American artist, complications of ischemic colitis.
- Pierluigi Chicca, 79, Italian fencer, Olympic silver (1964, 1968) and bronze medalist (1960).
- Keith Farnham, 69, American politician, member of the Illinois House of Representatives (2009–2014).
- Albert Franks, 81, English footballer (Newcastle United, Rangers, Greenock Morton).
- Dick Gemmell, 80, English rugby footballer.
- Roger Greenspun, 87, American journalist and film critic.
- Tim Hague, 34, Canadian mixed martial artist (UFC, WSOF, KOTC), brain hemorrhage.
- John Wesley Hardt, 95, American Methodist prelate and author.
- Shigeomi Hasumi, 49, Japanese composer, colon cancer.
- Joel Joffe, Baron Joffe, 85, South African-born British human rights lawyer and life peer.
- Predhiman Krishan Kaw, 69, Indian plasma physicist, heart disease.
- Joyce Lindores, 73, Scottish bowler, Commonwealth Games gold medalist (1988).
- Tony Liscio, 76, American football player (Dallas Cowboys), amyotrophic lateral sclerosis.
- Antonio Medellín, 75, Mexican actor (Tres veces Ana, Porque el amor manda, Cuando me enamoro).
- Chris Murrell, 61, American jazz singer.
- Simon Nelson, 85, American mass murderer.
- Shih Chun-jen, 93, Taiwanese neurosurgeon and politician, Minister of the Department of Health (1986–1990), heart attack.
- Ola Skarholt, 77, Norwegian orienteering runner, world champion (1970).
- Doug Volmar, 72, American ice hockey player (Detroit Red Wings, Los Angeles Kings).
- Shirley Walters, 91, Australian politician, Senator for Tasmania (1975–1993).

=== 19 ===
- Wivianne Bergh, 78, Swedish Olympic discus thrower (1960).
- Brian Cant, 83, British actor (Dappledown Farm) and television presenter (Play School), complications from Parkinson's disease.
- Jan Coggeshall, 81, American politician.
- Ron Crane, 67, American electrical engineer, cancer.
- Ivan Dias, 81, Indian Roman Catholic cardinal, Archbishop of Bombay (1996–2006) and Prefect of the Congregation for the Evangelization of Peoples (2006–2011).
- Tony DiCicco, 68, American soccer coach (women's national team), Olympic champion (1996) and 1999 World Cup winner.
- Tabaré Hackenbruch, 88, Uruguayan politician, MP (1967–1973) and Mayor of Canelones (1985–1989, 1995–2005).
- Carla Fendi, 79, Italian fashion executive (Fendi).
- Sir Brian Kenny, 83, British army general, Deputy Supreme Allied Commander Europe (1990–1993).
- Hedwig Leenaert, 85, Belgian Olympic athlete.
- Ilse Pagé, 78, German actress (Berlin, Schoenhauser Corner).
- Amrit Pal, 76, Indian actor, cirrhosis.
- José Ribas, 89, Spanish Olympic racewalker.
- Zoltan Sarosy, 110, Hungarian-born Canadian chess master.
- Annikki Tähti, 87, Finnish schlager singer.
- Richard Toop, 71, British-Australian musicologist.
- Otto Warmbier, 22, American college student, convicted of theft and imprisoned by North Korea.
- Erich Winkler, 82, Austrian Olympic ice hockey player.

=== 20 ===
- Roger D. Abrahams, 84, American folklorist.
- Herbert H. Ágústsson, 90, Austrian-born Icelandic composer and musician.
- Ali Audah, 92, Indonesian author.
- James Berry, 93, Jamaican-born British poet, Alzheimer's disease.
- Mervyn Crossman, 82, Australian field hockey player, Olympic bronze medalist (1964).
- Clifton Gilliard, 79, American football player and coach.
- Bob Johnson, 71, American politician.
- Frode Larsen, 68, Norwegian footballer (SK Brann, national team).
- Sergei Mylnikov, 58, Russian ice hockey player (Traktor Chelyabinsk, Quebec Nordiques), Olympic champion (1988).
- John Perry, 97, English Anglican priest, Archdeacon of Middlesex (1975–1982).
- Prodigy, 42, American rapper (Mobb Deep), accidental choking.
- R. D. Reid, 72, Canadian actor (Nero Wolfe, Dawn of the Dead, Capote).
- Héctor Ríos Ereñú, 86, Argentine military officer, Chief of Defense Staff (1983–1987).
- William Schull, 95, American geneticist.
- Fredrik Skagen, 80, Norwegian writer.
- John Francis Talling, 88, British limnologist.

=== 21 ===
- Gurmit Singh Aulakh, 79, Pakistani research scientist and political activist.
- Gwen Barlee, 54, Canadian environmentalist, cancer.
- Vicki Berner, 71, Canadian tennis player.
- Philip Coppens, 86, Dutch-born American chemist and crystallographer.
- Yuri Drozdov, 91, Russian spymaster.
- Kelechi Emeteole, 66, Nigerian footballer (national team), throat cancer.
- John Faull, 83, Welsh rugby union player (Swansea, British Lions).
- Thomas Gnat, 80, American bishop.
- Leroy Jenkins, 83, American televangelist.
- Jean-Pierre Kahane, 90, French mathematician.
- Pompeyo Márquez, 95, Venezuelan politician and guerrilla, founder of the Movement for Socialism party and Minister of Borders (1994–1999).
- Steffi Martin, 54, German luger, Olympic (1984, 1988) and world champion (1983, 1985), cancer.
- Udit Narayan, 57, Fijian politician.
- Ludger Rémy, 68, German harpsichordist and conductor.
- Belton Richard, 77, American singer and Cajun accordionist, pneumonia.
- György Rubovszky, 73, Hungarian lawyer and politician, MP (1994–2002, since 2003).
- Con Sciacca, 70, Italian-born Australian politician, MP for Bowman (1987–1996, 1998–2004), Minister for Veterans' Affairs (1994–1996), cancer.
- Robert M. Shoemaker, 93, American military officer, commander of FORSCOM (1977–1982).
- Ray Smith, 88, English footballer (Southend United F.C.).
- Alexandre Sowa, 90, French cyclist.
- Brian Street, 73, British anthropologist.
- Ila Teromaa, 63, Finnish motorcycle speedway rider, complications from surgery.
- Gordon Voss, 79, American politician, member of the Minnesota House of Representatives (1973–1989), traffic collision.
- Howard Witt, 85, American actor (Death of a Salesman).

=== 22 ===
- Norman Ayrton, 92, British actor, director and theatre instructor.
- Richard Benson, 73, American photographer, heart failure.
- Vincent Cooke, 81, American Jesuit and academic administrator, President of Canisius College (1993–2010), cancer.
- Pavel Dalaloyan, 38, Russian footballer, traffic collision.
- Paul De Rolf, 74, American actor (The Ten Commandments, The Beverly Hillbillies) and choreographer (1941), Alzheimer's disease.
- Hervé Filion, 77, Canadian Hall of Fame harness racing driver, complications from COPD.
- Gunter Gabriel, 75, German singer, musician and composer, fall.
- Kevin Gatter, 65, English pathologist.
- Necmettin Karaduman, 90, Turkish politician.
- Des Hanafin, 86, Irish politician, member of Seanad Éireann (1965–2002).
- Carroll N. Jones III, 72, American artist.
- Mao Kobayashi, 34, Japanese actress and television presenter (NTV), breast cancer.
- Frank Kush, 88, American Hall of Fame football player and coach (Arizona State).
- Keith Loneker, 46, American football player (Los Angeles Rams) and actor (Out of Sight, Superbad), cancer.
- László Marosi, 81, Hungarian comics writer.
- Quett Masire, 91, Botswanan politician, President (1980–1998), complications from surgery.
- Sheila Michaels, 78, American writer and activist, popularizer of term Ms., leukemia.
- Bogoljub Mitić Đoša, 49, Serbian comedian and actor, heart attack.
- Jimmy Nalls, 66, American rock guitarist (Sea Level), fall.
- Hartmut Neugebauer, 74, German actor (Charley's Nieces, Derrick).
- Armand Nicholi, 89, American psychiatrist.
- John R. Quinn, 88, American Roman Catholic prelate, Archbishop of San Francisco (1977–1995).
- Bob Ring, 70, American ice hockey player (Boston Bruins).
- John E. Sarno, 93, American physician and writer.
- Philip F. Smith, 84, American Coast Guard officer.
- Sandy Tatum, 96, American sports administrator, president of the USGA (1978–1980).
- Robert F. Tinker, 75, American physicist and educationalist.
- Yevhen Vansovych, 86, Ukrainian Olympian.
- Stewart Wieck, 49, American game designer (White Wolf Publishing).
- Nikolai Zhugan, 100, Ukrainian-born Russian pilot, Hero of the Soviet Union (1944).

=== 23 ===
- William Dehning, 74, American conductor.
- John Freeman, 83, Welsh rugby player (Halifax R.L.F.C.).
- Ant Gyi, 94, Burmese singer.
- Saman Kelegama, 58, Sri Lankan economist, stroke.
- Dennis McNamara, 82, English footballer (Tranmere Rovers).
- Betty Metcalf, 95, American politician, member of the Florida House of Representatives (1982–1988), vascular dementia.
- Edwin Mieczkowski, 87, American graphic artist and painter, multiple organ failure.
- Mr. Pogo, 66, Japanese professional wrestler (FMW, CSW, W*ING), cerebral infarction during back surgery.
- Nobuyuki Ōuchi, 75, Japanese professional shogi player.
- Gabe Pressman, 93, American journalist (WNBC).
- Stefano Rodotà, 84, Italian jurist and politician, Vice President of the Chamber of Deputies (1992).
- Sandi Russell, 71, American jazz singer.
- Lucy Seki, 78, Brazilian linguist.
- Laird Sloan, 81, Canadian Olympic sprinter.
- Tonny van der Linden, 84, Dutch footballer (VV DOS, national team).

=== 24 ===
- Gordon Beznoska, 68, American politician.
- Andrey Dvinyaninov, 31, Russian sledge hockey player, Paralympic silver medalist (2014).
- Paul Fitzgerald, 94, Australian painter.
- Leon Harden, 69, American football player (Green Bay Packers).
- Amir Hassanpour, 73, Iranian-born Canadian academic.
- Loren Janes, 85, American stuntman (Back to the Future, Hook, The Abyss), complications from Alzheimer's disease.
- Mats Johansson, 65, Swedish journalist and politician, MP (2006–2014).
- Nick Kirk, 59, New Zealand priest, motor neuron disease.
- Tom Kremer, 87, Romanian-born British game designer and publisher.
- Parker Lee McDonald, 93, American jurist, Chief Justice of the Supreme Court of Florida (1979–1994).
- Maria Mutagamba, 64, Ugandan economist and politician, Minister of Tourism (2012–2016), liver cancer.
- Nils Nilsson, 81, Swedish ice hockey player (national team), Olympic silver medalist (1964).
- Monica Nordquist, 76, Swedish actress (Du är inte klok, Madicken).
- Tomasi Rabaka, 51, Fijian rugby union player.
- Véronique Robert, 54, French-Swiss journalist, injuries sustained in explosion.
- Anand Pal Singh, 42, Indian gangster, shot.
- Martin J. Steinbach, 75, Canadian ophthalmologist.
- Alberto Zerain, 55, Spanish mountaineer, avalanche.
- Meir Zlotowitz, 73, American rabbi and publisher (ArtScroll).

=== 25 ===
- Elsa Daniel, 80, Argentine film actress (The Grandfather, The House of the Angel, La mano en la trampa).
- Agha Shahbaz Khan Durrani, Pakistani politician, Senator (since 2015), heart attack.
- Dave Evans, 66, American bluegrass musician.
- Olga Feliú, 84, Chilean lawyer, academic and politician, Senator (1990–1998).
- Walter Fillmore, 84, American marines brigadier general.
- Hal Fryar, 90, American actor and TV show host (The Three Stooges), bladder cancer.
- David Goldsmith, 85, New Zealand Olympic field hockey player.
- Harry Gorringe, 89, Australian cricketer (Western Australia).
- Eloise Hardt, 99, American actress (The Dennis O'Keefe Show, Days of Our Lives, The Kentucky Fried Movie).
- Skip Homeier, 86, American actor (Tomorrow, the World!, Boys' Ranch, Star Trek), spinal myelopathy.
- Joseph Johnson III, 77, American physicist.
- Sunil Lal Joshi, 51, Nepalese Olympic weightlifter (1996), heart attack.
- Lorna McDonald, 100, Australian historian and author.
- Denis McQuail, 82, British communication theorist.
- K. R. Mohanan, 69, Indian film director (Swaroopam), stomach illness.
- Félix Mourinho, 79, Portuguese football player and manager (Vitória Setúbal, Rio Ave).
- Meir Nimni, 68, Israeli Olympic footballer.
- Robert Overend, 86, Northern Irish farmer and politician.
- Sir Richard Paniguian, 67, British civil servant and industrialist.
- Maurice Peatros, 90, American baseball player (Homestead Grays).
- Alain Senderens, 77, French chef.
- Gordon Wilson, 79, Scottish politician, leader of the Scottish National Party (1979–1990), MP (1974–1987).
- Eduard Zeman, 69, Czech politician, Minister of Education, Youth and Sports (1998–2002).

=== 26 ===
- David Bleakley, 92, Northern Irish politician, MP (1958–1965).
- Jimmy Chi, 69, Australian playwright and composer (Bran Nue Dae).
- Jean Delahaye, 87, French cyclist.
- Claude Fagedet, 89, French photographer.
- John Groves, 83, English footballer (Luton Town, Bournemouth & Boscombe Athletic).
- Desh Bandhu Gupta, 79, Indian billionaire businessman, founder of Lupin Limited.
- Janet Lunn, 88, American-born Canadian children's writer (The Root Cellar, The Hollow Tree).
- Rex Makin, 91, British solicitor, coined the term "Beatlemania".
- Sir Duncan McMullin, 90, New Zealand jurist.
- Guy Ngan, 91, New Zealand artist.
- Doug Peterson, 71, American yacht designer, cancer.
- Isaías Pimentel, 84, Venezuelan tennis player.
- Habib Thiam, 84, Senegalese politician, Prime Minister (1981–1983, 1991–1998).
- Alice Trolle-Wachtmeister, 91, Swedish countess, Chief Court Mistress (1994-2015).
- Suzanne Wasserman, 60, American historian and filmmaker, progressive supranuclear palsy.

=== 27 ===
- Bridget Allchin, 90, British archaeologist.
- Geri Allen, 60, American jazz pianist, composer and educator, cancer.
- Dušan T. Bataković, 60, Serbian historian and diplomat.
- Peter L. Berger, 88, American sociologist (Boston University).
- Better Talk Now, 18, American racehorse, winner of the 2004 Breeders' Cup Turf, euthanized.
- Piotr Bikont, 62, Polish journalist, publicist, culinary critic, and theatre director, traffic collision.
- Michael Bond, 91, British children's author (Paddington Bear).
- Jacinta Coleman, 42, New Zealand Olympic cyclist (2000), bowel cancer.
- Pierre Combescot, 77, French journalist and writer.
- Tom Corcoran, 85, American Olympic alpine skier (1956, 1960).
- Sudhin Das, 87, Bangladeshi Nazrul Sangeet musician.
- Mildred Earp, 91, American baseball player (Grand Rapids Chicks).
- Mary Blagg Huey, 95, American educator, president of Texas Woman's University (1976–1986).
- Ryoichi Jinnai, 90, Japanese businessman, heart failure.
- Rae Desmond Jones, 75, Australian poet, novelist and politician.
- Paolo Limiti, 77, Italian journalist, television/radio writer/presenter and songwriter ("Silent Voices"), brain cancer.
- João Oneres Marchiori, 84, Brazilian Roman Catholic prelate, Bishop of Caçador (1977–1983) and Lages (1987–2009).
- Michael Nyqvist, 56, Swedish actor (The Girl with the Dragon Tattoo, Mission: Impossible – Ghost Protocol, John Wick), lung cancer.
- Stéphane Paille, 52, French football player and manager (Sochaux, national team).
- Fernando Picó, 75, Puerto Rican academic, historian and Jesuit priest, specialist on the history of Puerto Rico.
- Valentín Pimstein, 91, Chilean television producer (María la del Barrio, Marimar, Carrusel), respiratory arrest.
- Dave Rosser, 50, American guitarist (The Afghan Whigs), colon cancer.
- Lillian Shadic, 88, American baseball player (Springfield Sallies).
- Maksym Shapoval, 38, Ukrainian chief intelligence officer, car bomb.
- Ric Suggitt, 58, Canadian rugby union coach (national team).
- Suh Yun-bok, 94, South Korean Olympic athlete (1948), winner of the Boston Marathon (1947).
- Mustafa Tlass, 85, Syrian military officer and politician, Minister of Defense (1972–2004).
- Roger Toulson, Lord Toulson, 70, British lawyer and Supreme Court judge.
- Toytown, 24, British eventing horse.
- Anthony Young, 51, American baseball player (New York Mets, Chicago Cubs, Houston Astros), brain cancer.

=== 28 ===
- Russ Adams, 86, American tennis photographer.
- Cynthia Barnes-Boyd, 64, American academic administrator.
- Robert Bockstael, 94, Canadian politician.
- Peter Paul Busuttil, 73, Maltese politician, Mayor of Hal Safi (1994-2012) and involved in Raymond Caruana murder.
- Phil Cohran, 90, American jazz trumpeter.
- Christopher Colclough, 70, English economist.
- Michael Lindsay Coulton Crawford, 100, British submariner.
- C. O. Erickson, 93, American producer and production manager (Rear Window, Chinatown, Blade Runner), heart complications.
- John Higgins, 87, Scottish footballer (Hibernian), Alzheimer's disease.
- Nazmul Huda Bachchu, 78, Bangladeshi actor.
- John Kapele, 79, American football player (Pittsburgh Steelers, Philadelphia Eagles).
- Eamon M. Kelly, 81, American economist and academic administrator, complications following surgery.
- Shinji Mori, 42, Japanese baseball player and coach, sepsis.
- Bernard Nottage, 71, Bahamian politician and Olympic sprinter (1968).
- Wally O'Connell, 94, Australian rugby league footballer and coach (Eastern Suburbs, Manly-Warringah).
- Ola Mildred Rexroat, 99, American Airforce Service pilot during World War II.
- Bruce Stewart, 80, New Zealand author and playwright.
- Danbaba Suntai, 55, Nigerian politician, Governor of Taraba State (2007–2012), brain injury.

=== 29 ===
- Ai Mingzhi, 92, Chinese writer.
- James Davidson, 90, British politician, MP for West Aberdeenshire (1966–1970).
- Aline Hanson, 67, Saint Martin politician, cancer.
- Ken Hopper, 93, Australian football player (Hawthorn).
- Carl W. Kroening, 89, American politician.
- Miriam Marx, 90, American author.
- John Monckton, 78, Australian swimmer, Olympic silver medalist (1956) and Commonwealth Games champion (1958).
- Louis Nicollin, 74, French entrepreneur, Chairman of Montpellier Hérault Sport Club (since 1974), heart attack.
- Pan Qingfu, Chinese martial artist.
- Chuck Renslow, 87, American businessman and LGBT activist.
- Marrion Roe, 82, New Zealand Olympic swimmer (1956).
- Antonio Sagona, 61, Australian archaeologist.
- William Sanders, 75, American author and editor (Helix SF).
- Dave Semenko, 59, Canadian ice hockey player and scout (Edmonton Oilers), liver and pancreatic cancer.
- Achille Tramarin, 70, Italian politician.
- Suna Venter, 32, South African journalist and radio producer (SABC), heart failure.
- Michael Vickery, 86, American historian.
- Neil Welch, 90, American FBI agent.

=== 30 ===
- Ramiro Alejandro Celis, 25, Mexican bullfighter, gored.
- Minaketan Das, 55, Indian actor, pancreatic cancer.
- Karunamaya Goswami, 74, Bangladeshi musicologist.
- Mitchell Henry, 24, American football player (Denver Broncos, Green Bay Packers, Baltimore Ravens), leukemia.
- Colin Hughes, 87, Bahamian-born Australian political scientist.
- Darrall Imhoff, 78, American basketball player (New York Knicks, Los Angeles Lakers, Portland Trail Blazers), Olympic gold medalist (1960), heart attack.
- Godfrey Gitahi Kariuki, 79, Kenyan politician, MP (2003–2007) and Senator (since 2013).
- Bahadur Nariman Kavina, 80, Indian naval officer, commanding officer of the Nipat.
- László Kovács, 66, Hungarian football player (Videoton, ETO, national team) and coach.
- Barry Norman, 83, British film critic and television presenter (Film...).
- Rhona Ottolina, 63, Venezuelan politician.
- Max Runager, 61, American football player (Philadelphia Eagles, San Francisco 49ers).
- Ramon Schwartz Jr., 92, American politician.
- Jake Tordesillas, 68, Filipino screenwriter (Bagets, Captain Barbell, Magpakailanman), complications from a fall.
- Simone Veil, 89, French lawyer and politician, President of the European Parliament (1979–1982), Minister of Health (1974–1979, 1993–1995), and Holocaust survivor.
- Víctor Zalazar, 84, Argentine boxer, Olympic bronze medallist (1956).
