= General Franklin =

General Franklin may refer to:

- Charles D. Franklin (1931–1992), U.S. Army lieutenant general
- Craig A. Franklin (fl. 1980s–2010s), U.S. Air Force lieutenant general
- Ray Franklin (1934–2017), U.S. Marine Corps major general
- William B. Franklin (1823–1903), Union Army major general

== See also ==
- Harold Franklyn (1885−1963), British Army general
- William Franklyn (British Army officer) (1856–1914), British Army lieutenant general
- Attorney General Franklin (disambiguation)
