= Dalaloyan =

Dalaloyan (Armenian: Դալալոյան, Russian: Далалоян) is an Armenian surname that may refer to the following notable people:

- Artur Dalaloyan (born 1996), Russian artistic gymnast
- Pavel Dalaloyan (1978–2017), Russian football player
