= When the Tide Turns Again =

When The Tide Turns Again

Studio album by Vin Garbutt
- Released: 1998
- Genre: Folk
- Length: 47:17
- Label: Home Roots Music

Vin Garbutt chronology
Plugged! (1995)	When The Tide Turns Again (1998)	Word of Mouth (1999)

When the Tide Turns Again is a 1998 folk music album by Vin Garbutt. It is a reissue of the earlier album When the Tide Turns with one additional track (The Court of Cahirass).

== Track listing ==
1. Where the Hell are we Going to Live
2. When the Tide Turns
3. The Ballad of John Pearson
4. Lady Anne Montgomery
5. Nica Nicaragua
6. The Court of Cahirass
7. Absent Friends
8. The Jolly Butchers/The London Lassies
9. Carol Anne Kelly
10. Not for the First Time
11. I Wouldn't Have One Myself
12. The Secret
