= Héctor Ríos =

Héctor Ríos may refer to:

- Héctor Ríos Igualt (1919–2011), Chilean lawyer, farmer, and politician
- Héctor Ríos Ereñú (1930–2017), Argentine military officer
- Héctor Ríos Ríos (1904–1990), Chilean surgeon and politician
