= Persona...Grata =

Studio album by Vin Garbutt
- Released: 2005
- Genre: Folk
- Length: 54:01
- Label: Home Roots Music

Vin Garbutt chronology
The Vin Garbutt Songbook Vol 1 (2003)	Persona...Grata (2005)

Persona...Grata is a 2005 folk music album by Vin Garbutt.

The album received a positive review from Grem Devlin of The Living Tradition, who praised its social commentary, and said Garbutt "sounds wonderful as ever".

== Track listing ==
1. Morning Informs
2. Silver and Gold
3. Storm Around Tumbledown
4. It Couldn't Be Done
5. The Flowers and the Guns
6. John Doonan's Hornpipe/Tinker's Alley Reel
7. For an Explanation
8. Down by the Dockyard Wall
9. Punjabi Girl
10. The Loftus Emigrant
11. The Kilburn Horse
