= Plugged! =

Live album by Vin Garbutt
- Released: 1995
- Genre: Folk
- Length: 1:11:03
- Label: Home Roots Music

Vin Garbutt chronology
| Bandalised (1994) | Plugged! (1995) | When The Tide Turns Again (1998) |

Plugged! is a 1995 folk music album by Vin Garbutt. The album was recorded live at the Red Lion Folk Club, Birmingham.

== Track listing ==
1. Wings
2. A Man of the Earth
3. To Find Their Ulster Peace
4. Fell off the Back of a Boat
5. Send the Boats Away
6. The Birk Brow Jig and Thomas McElvogue's Jig
7. Welcome Home Howard Green
8. Darwin To Dili
9. Believe Me, if All Those Endearing Young Charms
10. Away from the Pits
11. Nothing to Show for it All
12. When Oppressed Becomes Oppressor
