= Deo Rwabiita =

Ugandan politician and diplomat

Deo K. Rwabiita

Member of Parliament for Ibanda
- In office 1988–2001
- Succeeded by: John Byabagambi

Personal details
- Born: 1943 Ibanda District, Uganda
- Died: 7 June 2017 (aged 73–74) Kiruddu General Hospital, Uganda
- Education: University of Nairobi
- Occupation: Politician, Diplomat
- Known for: Deputy Minister of Relief and Social Rehabilitation; Ugandan Ambassador to Belgium, Germany, and Italy

Deo Rwabiita also known as Deo Kajunzire Rwabiita (1943 – 7 June 2017) was a Ugandan politician and diplomat.

Born in Ibanda District in 1943, Rwabiita studied marketing at the University of Nairobi in Kenya. He was appointed Deputy Minister of Relief and Social Rehabilitation in 1988 and took office in the parliament of Uganda later that year as a representative of Ibanda. He served until 2001 and was succeeded in office by John Byabagambi. Rwabiita later served as Ugandan ambassador to Belgium, Germany, and Italy. He died at the age of 74 on 7 June 2017, while at Kiruddu General Hospital.

== See also ==
- Mirjam Blaak
- Aggrey Awori
