= Attorney General Franklin =

Attorney General Franklin may refer to:

- Thomas E. Franklin (lawyer) (1810–1884), Attorney General of Pennsylvania
- Walter Franklin (judge) (1773–1836), Attorney General of Pennsylvania

== See also ==
- General Franklin (disambiguation)
