= Western Canada Wilderness Committee =

Nonprofit environmental education organization

The Western Canada Wilderness Committee (often shortened to Wilderness Committee) is a non-profit environmental education organization that aims to protect Canada's wild spaces and species. Paul George was the co-founding director along with Richard Krieger, and formed the Wilderness Committee in the province of British Columbia in 1980. It now has a membership of over 30,000 people with its head office in Vancouver and field offices in Victoria, British Columbia; Winnipeg, Manitoba; and Toronto, Ontario.

Other key campaigners for the Wilderness Committee over the years have been Adriane Carr, Colleen McCrory, Bryan Adams, Randy Stoltmann, Ken Lay, Joe Foy, Andrea Reimer, Ken Wu, Gwen Barlee and Nik Cuff.

== Mission ==
The Wilderness Committee's Mission is: To protect Canada's bio-diversity through strategic research and grassroots public education. The Wilderness Committee believes that the right, the duty and the ability to act are integral to citizenship. The Wilderness Committee values nature, with all its natural bio-diversity, as absolutely vital to the health of people, communities and the planet. The Wilderness Committee acts with integrity and courage to mobilize citizens to take lawful, democratic action to defend Canada's remaining wilderness and wildlife.

The Wilderness Committee has campaigned successfully, alongside other like minded individuals and organizations to protect millions of hectares of Canadian wilderness in over 40 key wilderness areas.

== Taking action ==
With community-based, grassroots education campaigns, the Wilderness Committee works to protect wild lands, safeguard wild habitats from destruction, defend the well-being of and public access to established national and provincial parks, keep wild rivers as a vital part of the natural environment and ensure that people can live and work in healthy communities. Underlying the Wilderness Committee's education work is a belief that citizens have the right, duty and the ability to stand up for the public interest and protect Canada and Earth's bio-diversity. The Wilderness Committee's educational work about pressing environmental issues reaches up to 5 million Canadians per year through door-to-door canvassing, rallies, petition drives, educational publications and the media in order to gain public support and bring about changes in government policy.

A strong research and mapping program and strategic alliances support the Wilderness Committee's educational mission. The Wilderness Committee often works closely with other environmental groups, First Nations and community leaders, and conducts regular expeditions into threatened wilderness areas.

== Wilderness Committee campaigns ==
Campaigns fall within the following areas:

1. Protecting Wild Lands

2. Safeguarding Wildlife

3. Defending Public Lands

4. Preserving the Pacific Coast

5. Supporting Healthy Communities

== Some current campaigns ==
=== BC rivers at risk ===
The Wilderness Committee is calling for a moratorium on all private river hydro-power projects in BC. Following the BC provincial government's 2002 Energy Plan, publicly owned BC Hydro was forbidden from producing new sources of hydroelectricity as part of a shift to deregulate and privatize the BC electricity sector. So far private power companies have staked 600 wild creeks and rivers. The Wilderness Committee is calling for a suspension on all private 'run-of river' power projects until they are regionally planned, environmentally appropriate, acceptable to First Nations and publicly owned.

=== Clayoquot Sound ===
This is one of the Wilderness Committee's longest lasting campaigns to protect the largest area of ancient temperate rainforest left on BC's Vancouver Island. With 75% of Vancouver Island's old-growth rainforest already logged, forestry companies continue to push for more logging operations in this rare ancient coastal rainforest. In 2008, forestry company, MaMook Coulson proposed logging in one of Clayoquot Sound's intact areas of ancient forest – the Hesquiat Point Creek Valley – sparking a strong response from the environmental community. Currently, no logging has taken place in the pristine area of Hesquiat Point Creek or any other intact area within Clayoquot Sound. But the conflict over potential logging in Hesquiat Point Creek has renewed the interest in finding a lasting solution for protecting Clayoquot Sound, while providing livelihood opportunities for those who live there. The designation of Clayoquot Sound as a UNESCO Biosphere Reserve in 2000, while a huge step forward, does not provide legislated protection.

=== BC endangered species ===
There are more than 1,600 species and subspecies are at risk of disappearing from BC, mostly due to human-caused degradation of habitat. From peregrine falcons and monarch butterflies to grizzly bears and spotted owls, endangered species such as these are left to fend for themselves against climate change, toxic contamination, urban sprawl, logging and industrial development as there is no stand-alone endangered species law in BC. The Wilderness Committee is calling on the provincial government to enact a law that will protect the habitat of endangered species and identify, protect and establish effective recovery plans for all endangered species across BC.

=== Canadian climate change solutions ===
Around the globe people are mobilizing to meet the challenges of climate change but instead of reducing greenhouse gas emissions. Canada continues to pursue policies that will greatly increase – not decrease – greenhouse gas emissions. Half of Canada's future emissions growth is projected to come from the Alberta and Saskatchewan tar sands. The Wilderness Committee's climate change campaign calls for the deep reduction of carbon emissions from burning fossil fuels, with legislated goals on reducing our carbon emissions that are set by the best science available. Stopping the expansion of fossil fuel extraction, like the Canadian tar sands, new coal mines or proposals for oil and gas exploration will address some of the domestic action needed to prevent runaway climate destruction. Stopping highway expansion and increasing investment in public transit, cycling and walking infrastructure and protecting wild lands like forests and wetlands, a significant storage of greenhouse gases, are some of the local solutions proposed by the Wilderness Committee.

=== Manitoba parks ===
Manitoba provincial parks were the most threatened parks in Canada, and some of the most threatened globally. But in 2009 the Wilderness Committee and other supportive individuals and organizations succeeded in convincing the provincial government to stop logging in 79 of Manitoba's 80 provincial parks. The Manitoba's Forest Amendment Act was assented to on June 11, 2009.

A license was issued in 2009 by the Manitoba government to build a logging road through the heart of the Grass River Provincial Park, an area that is also home to a newly discovered herd of caribou. In September 2009 the Wilderness Committee filed for a formal appeal against this license. The Wilderness Committee believes the decision to approve the road will have a negative impact on the migration route of the park's woodland caribou, which gained protected status under the province's Endangered Species Act in 2006.

=== Stop old growth logging in BC ===
The Wilderness Committee is calling on the BC government to protect BC's ancient forests by immediately banning logging in the most endangered old-growth forest types and phasing-out old-growth logging from the rest by 2015. The ancient forests provide essential habitat for endangered wildlife such as the spotted owl, marbled murrelet and mountain caribou.

According to the Wilderness Committee, BC's second-growth forests could be logged at a slower, more sustainable rate to better protect the environment while still providing wood working jobs. The Wilderness Committee is also calling for a ban on raw log exports to further protect wood worker jobs in BC.

== Organization ==
The Wilderness Committee has an annual budget of approximately $2 million (CAN). There are about two dozen staff members who carry out various functions, including organizing volunteers, publishing educational materials, campaigning for the protection of nature and financial management. There are also around 20 to 30 contract door-to-door canvassers, who distribute the Wilderness Committee's educational materials and solicit donations and memberships. There are also up to 100 volunteers who work in the mailing rooms, build trails and help with rallies and events throughout the year. Most employees work from the headquarters in Vancouver with other campaign staff and contract canvassing staff also working from field offices in Victoria, Winnipeg, and Toronto. The Wilderness Committee's Mid-Island Branch, headquartered in Qualicum Beach, Vancouver Island, BC is all volunteer run.

Approximately 90% of all Wilderness Committee funding comes from individual donations and membership fees with the remaining funds coming from foundations and grants.

All members receive the Wilderness Committee's annual calendar, five to seven newspapers providing information about current campaigns and wilderness areas and 10% discount on all Wilderness Committee products, such as nature-based cards, calendars, posters and books.

An elected, nine-member volunteer board of directors who each serve three years in post governs the Wilderness Committee.

The Board appoints and gives direction to the Executive Team. The Executive Team carries on the day-to-day management of the Wilderness Committee. It reports to the board of directors and serves as ex officio non-voting members of the board and board committees.

== History ==
When the Wilderness Committee was founded in 1980 there was little information available to the public on Canadian wilderness issues. Under the leadership of Paul George and the Committee's first Executive Director, Richard Krieger, the Wilderness Committee began to research, publish and distribute information about threatened Canadian wilderness; especially focusing on the big-treed temperate rainforests of coastal BC. The Wilderness Committee's primary goal was to build grassroots and broad public support for protecting ecosystems and bio-diversity. The Wilderness Committee's first project was the collaborative production of a 1981 full-colour wall calendar featuring 12 endangered wilderness areas in Western Canada, with response tear-offs to a dozen different Canadian environmental groups.

In its early years the Wilderness Committee mounted campaigns in collaboration with other groups (e.g., South Moresby/Gwaii Haanas – with the council of the Haida Nation and Islands Protection Society; and the Valhalla Campaign with the Valhalla Wilderness Society). In 1985, the Wilderness Committee initiated a new campaign tactic with its Stein Valley campaign. A hiking trail was constructed into the threatened wilderness area so that citizens, media, scientists and politicians could go there and see the Stein Valley wilderness for themselves. This activity required mobilizing dozens of committed volunteers and moved the Wilderness Committee into an active year-round organization.

1988 was a pivotal year for the Wilderness Committee. It launched its first stand alone campaign to protect Carmanah Valley from industrial logging, and brought national attention to the importance of protecting Canada's big-treed ancient temperate rainforests. The Wilderness Committee initiated its first door-to-door canvass with a focus on Carmanah Valley and from 1988 to 1990 increased its membership from roughly 3,000 to over 30,000. During this campaign the Wilderness Committee honed its skills in public education. Over a 2-year period the Wilderness Committee published and distributed over 1 million copies of the organization's educational tabloid style newspapers, 500,000 Adopt-A-Tree mail-in opinion cards, 10,000 copies of the Wilderness Committee's award-winning book Carmanah – Visions of an Ancient Rainforest, 20,000 posters, 45,000 calendars and thousands of news releases on the Carmanah Valley issue. As part of this campaign the Wilderness Committee also conducted slide-show tours in BC and Ontario, built its first boardwalk wilderness trail, produced the organization's first video, built the world's first upper canopy ancient temperate rainforest research station and supported researchers who discovered hundreds of new insect species in the treetops of the Carmanah Valley. The Wilderness Committee Carmanah Valley campaign ultimately resulted in Provincial Park protection for the whole valley.

By 1990 the Wilderness Committee had become the largest membership-based, citizen funded wilderness preservation group in western Canada, largely through its outreach efforts.

Wilderness Committee campaigns have helped gain the protection of many important wilderness areas, (2) including critical wildlife habitats and some of the world's last large tracts of old growth temperate rainforest and boreal forest. Notable achievements include playing a key role in gaining protection for South Moresby - Gwaii Hanas (BC), Caribou Mountains Park (AB), South Atikaki (MB), Carmanah Valley (BC), Pinecone/Boise/Burke (BC), Manigotagan River (MB), Stein Valley Nlaka'Pamux (BC), Sooke Hills (BC) and the designation of Clayoquot Sound (BC) as a United Nations Biosphere Reserve, and many other areas resulting in over 40 protected areas in western Canada.

Through successful litigation, the Wilderness Committee set significant legal precedents; logging was stopped in Wood Buffalo National Park and Greater Victoria's drinking watershed; established that no logging roads should be built without approved logging permits; guaranteed public access to crown lands; and, most recently, afforded critically endangered species' habitat protection from logging under BC's Forest Practices Code.
