= Paul George (environmentalist) =

Canadian environmentalist

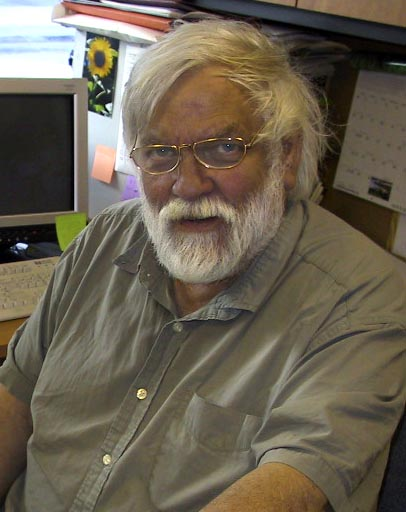
Paul George in 2005.

Paul George, OBC is a Canadian environmentalist living in Gibsons, British Columbia. He is married to Adriane Carr, former leader of the Green Party of British Columbia, for which he ran in 1991, receiving 0.82% of the popular vote in the riding of Surrey-Newton.

In the late 1960s, after leaving the United States, Paul George lived and worked on Vancouver Island as a teacher, builder, and lead science teacher for the British Columbia provincial correspondence school program.

He cofounded the Western Canada Wilderness Committee, and founded ActionInTime, a society for public education about global climate change.

In 1999 he was the first recipient of the BC Spaces for Nature Wild Earth Award.

In 2006, he authored Big Trees, Not Big Stumps, a history of the Western Canada Wilderness Committee.

In 2020, he was awarded the Order of British Columbia.
