= The Vin Garbutt Songbook Vol 1 =

Compilation album by Vin Garbutt
- Released: 2003
- Genre: Folk
- Length: 1:13:50
- Label: Home Roots Music

Vin Garbutt chronology
Word of Mouth (1999)	The Vin Garbutt Songbook Vol 1 (2003)	Persona...Grata (2005)

The Vin Garbutt Songbook Vol 1 is a 2003 folk music album by Vin Garbutt. It is a compilation of 17 songs from his earlier albums, all written by Garbutt between 1970 and 2000.

== Track listing ==
1. The Valley of Tees
2. Not for the First Time
3. The By-Pass Syndrome
4. Filipino Maid
5. The Land of Three Rivers (John North)
6. England My England
7. Welcome Home Howard Green
8. When the Tide Turns
9. Old Cissy Lee
10. Dormanstown Jimmy
11. Slaggy Island Farewell
12. Lynda
13. Darwin to Dili
14. The Troubles of Erin
15. El Salvador
16. Danny Danielle
17. The One Legged Beggar
