= Raymond Caruana =

Maltese political activist

- Born: 9 May 1960
- Died: 5 December 1986 (aged 26); Gudja
- Cause of death: Shot by gunfire
- Resting place: Addolorata Cemetery, Paola
- Occupation: Carpenter
- Political party: Partit Nazzjonalista

Raymond Caruana (9 May 1960 – 5 December 1986) was a Maltese political activist affiliated with the Nationalist Party (PN). Caruana was murdered in a drive-by shooting at a PN club in Gudja.

== Murder ==
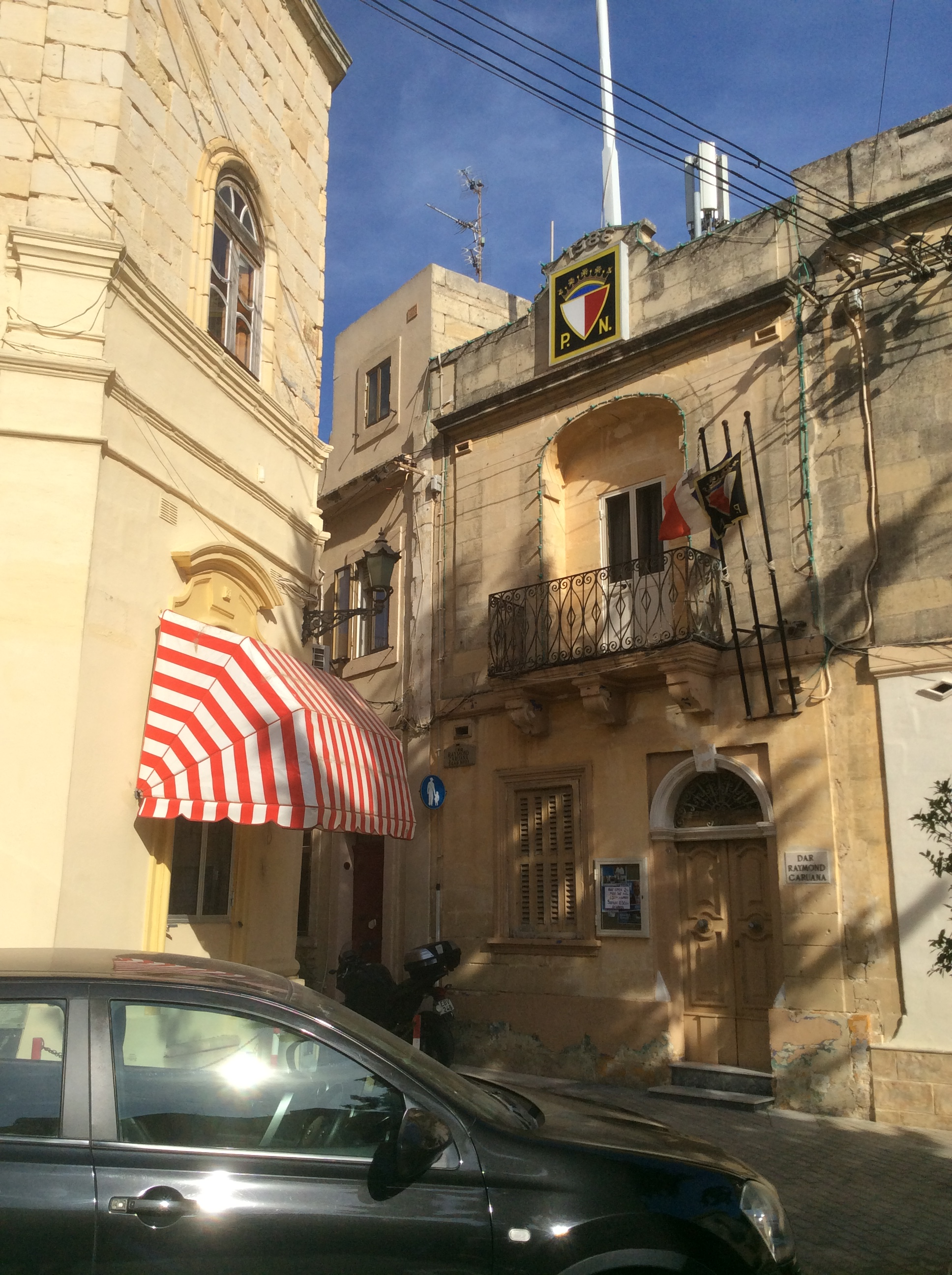
The Nationalist club in Gudja, where Caruana was murdered. It is now known as Dar Raymond Caruana

While Caruana was at the PN club in Gudja, a land rover driven by Malta Labour Party thugs drove past the club firing several shots. One bullet hit him in the throat, killing him.

Peter Paul Busuttil was accused of the murder; however, in the Maltese Law Courts, it later transpired that Busuttil had been the victim of a frame-up orchestrated by thugs from the ruling Labour Party with the aid of corrupt police officers. The case is still unsolved to the present day.

During the December 1986 TV transmission of the budget debates in Parliament, Wistin Abela assaulted Eddie Fenech Adami when the latter brought up the shooting of Raymond Caruana.

== Suspects ==
Later investigations carried out under a new Nationalist administration identified Nicholas Ellul (iċ-Ċaqwes), as the owner of the Sterling submachine gun used in the shooting, and in 1990 was charged with Caruana’s murder. He was never arraigned because he died from an overdose in 2001.

In 1997, Ġanni Psaila (il-Pupa), a former Labour Party thug testified in court that his former buddy and fellow thug, Karmenu Farrugia (il-Botom) had opened fire at the PN club in Tarxien. This was a separate but related incident which happened four days prior to the murder of Raymond Caruana; since a later investigation established that the shots fired at the PN club in Tarxien, came from the same submachine gun used to shoot at the PN club in Gudja. Farrugia denied the allegation. Ten months later, at dawn of 26 November 1997 of that same year, Psaila died after falling from a building shaft while supposedly robbing a bar in Birzebbuga.

Anthony Carabott (It-Totò), Edwin Bartolo (il-Qaħbu) and Michael Spiteri (il-Qattus) were also investigated, but the allegations against them were never substantiated. Carabott who has maintained his innocence throughout the years, in 2015 stated he was only named as a suspect because he was the owner of the Land Rover which was driven during the murder.

== Memorials ==
- Raymond Caruana Garden, Gudja.
- Two streets. One located in Gudja and the other in Għajnsielem.

== See also ==
- List of unsolved murders (1980–1999)
