= David Shentow =

Belgian-Canadian Holocaust survivor and educator (1925–2017)

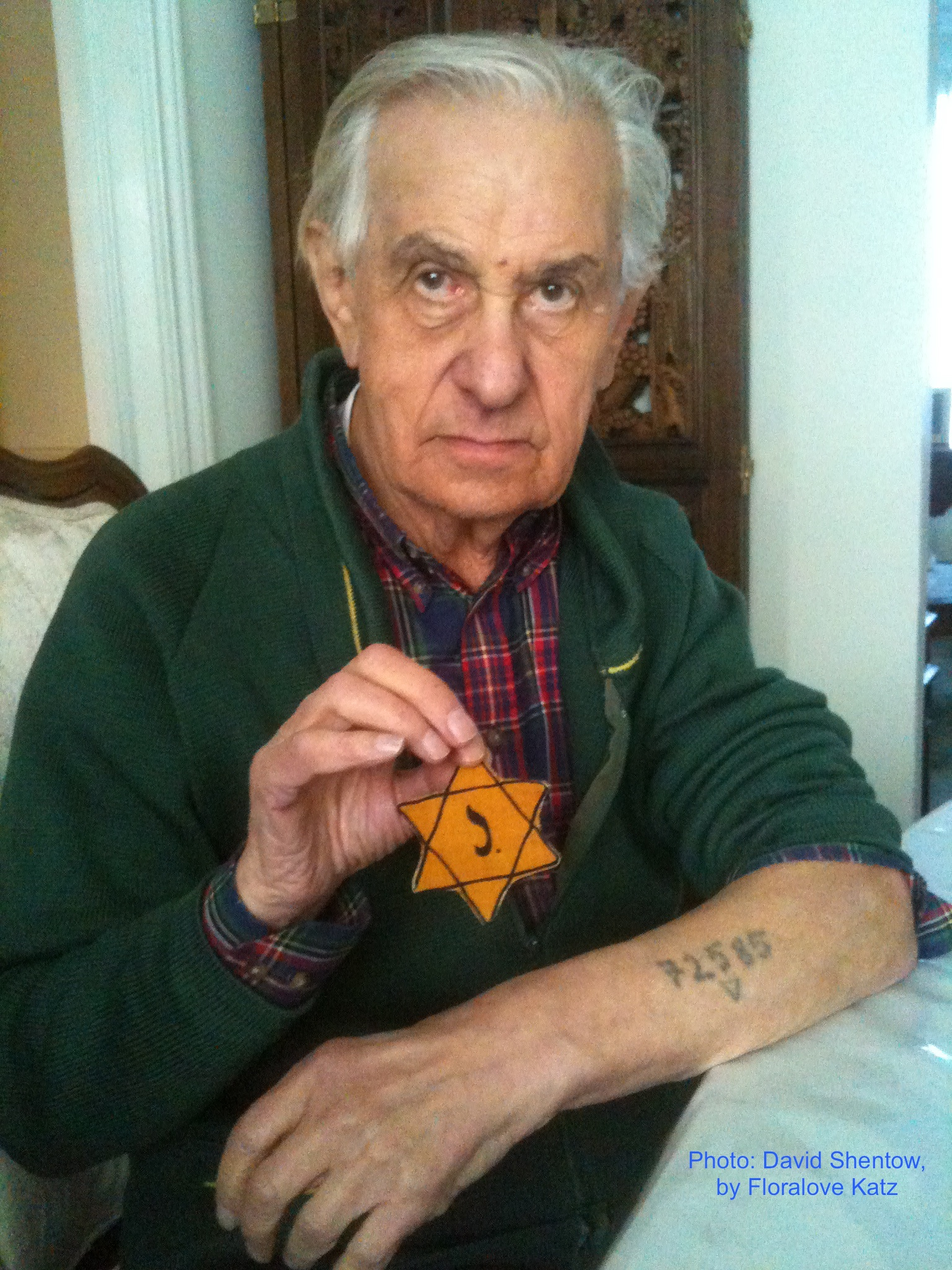
David Shentow holds Jewish Star sewn by his father - arm tattooed 72585 in Auschwitz

David Shentow (April 29, 1925 – June 12, 2017) was a Belgian-Canadian Holocaust survivor and educator, featured in Canadian films, books and articles. He received the Queen Elizabeth II Diamond Jubilee Medal in 2012, and the Sovereign's Medal for Volunteers in 2017. For "extraordinary community service to the citizens of the City of Ottawa, the Province of Ontario and Canada", the "David Shentow Park" was unveiled by Mayor Jim Watson (Canadian politician) on 11 September 2022.

== Early life ==
David Shentow was born Dydja Krzetowski on April 29, 1925 in Warsaw, Poland, to Rivka and Moishe Avraham, both from Białobrzegi, Poland. His parents moved to Antwerp, Belgium where David attended the local Tachkemoni school and his sisters, Paula (Perel) and Esther were born. Of his immediate family, only David survived the Holocaust.

== WWII ==
World War II broke out in September 1939. The Holocaust in Belgium began with the German invasion in May 1940: the Military Government passed the first anti-Jewish laws in October that year.

Shentow and his family - like all Belgian Jews - were refused emigration documents. In 1941, their radios and bicycles were confiscated by the Gestapo. Shentow and his sisters - indeed, all Jewish children - were denied access to schools: they were banned from parks, and other public places. From May 1942, Shentow and all Jewish citizens - including babies and young children - were forced to wear the yellow Star of David that segregated them for persecution.

In 1942, all men and boys over 16, were instructed to report to the Mechelen transit camp (halfway between Antwerp and Brussels). David and his father - a tailor - were deported to a labour camp in France, where they were beaten as slaves, labouring on the Chemin Des Juifs.

Later that year Shentow was transferred to the Auschwitz-Birkenau extermination camp. All members of his family in Europe - his parents, sisters, cousins, aunts, and uncles - were murdered.

Shentow survived slave labour, the Auschwitz extermination camp, the death marches, and the Dachau concentration camp, from which he was liberated on his 20th birthday (April 29, 1945).

== Appearance in films ==
David Shentow's personal testimony is featured in the film by Montreal-born Floralove Katz, David Shentow: Prisoner of the Nazi Holocaust, No. 72585 (2020).

Historian Marcus R. Roberts consulted with David Shentow on his research on the Chemin Des Juifs (2015).

Shentow is the central figure in the Ottawa-born documentary Director Koa Padolsky's film Le Chemin des Juifs (2017), which chronicles his Holocaust experiences during the war. Le Chemin des Juifs (The Road of the Jews) refers to a 4-kilometer concrete road poured and formed (under terrible condition and duress) by Belgian Jewish slave labourers: it was intended for attacks on England by heavy armoured vehicles and tanks. The road is located in a nature reserve near the French coastline towns of Neufchâtel-Hardelot and Condette. Still visible in the concrete are bare foot-prints of Jewish slave prisoners, the jack-boots of their German captors, and paw-prints of the vicious German Shepherd dogs.

Shentow appears in the 2015 film Blind Love.

David and his wife Rose participated on eight March of the Living missions. Over decades, hundreds of listeners became, as he termed it, "witnesses of the Holocaust" as Shentow shared his testimony in lectures at high schools, universities, police academies and for the Canadian military.

== Later life and Holocaust education ==
David Shentow immigrated to Canada in 1949. He married Rose Feldberg (of origin from Białobrzegi, Poland) and they raised two daughters. A chance encounter in the 1980s with Holocaust denier Ernst Zundel prompted Shentow to speak about the Holocaust over the following decades. In Witness: Passing the Torch of Holocaust Memory to New Generations, by Eli Rubenstein, Shentow's quotes evoke his experiences.
