= Dennis McNamara (footballer) =

English footballer (1935–2017)

Personal information
- Full name: Anthony Dennis McNamara
- Date of birth: 8 March 1935
- Place of birth: Birkenhead, England
- Date of death: 23 June 2017 (aged 82)
- Place of death: Brisbane, Australia
- Position: Winger

Senior career*
Years	Team	Apps	(Gls)
1954–1955	Tranmere Rovers	1	(0)
- * Club domestic league appearances and goals

Anthony Dennis McNamara (8 March 1935 – 23 June 2017) was an English footballer, who played as a winger in the Football League for Tranmere Rovers. He died in Brisbane, Australia on 23 June 2017, at the age of 82.
