= Suna Venter =

South African journalist, writer, and radio producer

- Died: 29 June 2017; Johannesburg, South Africa
- Occupations: Journalist, fiction writer, senior radio broadcaster
- Employer: South Africa Broadcasting corporation
- Known for: One of a group of eight journalists ( SABC8) suspended in 2016

Suna Venter was a South African current affairs journalist, fiction writer, and senior radio producer at the South African Broadcasting Corporation (SABC), working for Radio Sonder Grense (RSG). She was one of a group of eight journalists known as the SABC8 who were suspended in 2016 for objecting to the editorial policies implemented by then-SABC COO and now politician Hlaudi Motsoeneng.

Most notably the policy by the SABC of refusing to air protest footage. The policy was reversed following a parliamentary enquiry.

Following their suspension the journalists including Venter were the victims of numerous death threats, home break-ins and other forms of intimidation to get them to drop a Constitutional Court case against the SABC.

== Death ==
On 29 June 2017, Venter was found dead in her home in Kelland, Johannesburg. She was 32 years old. Her death is believed to have resulted from stress induced cardiomyopathy caused by the intimidation attempts against her following her and her colleagues' criticism of Motsoeneng's policies.

The Inkatha Freedom Party made a statement following her death that she "was a hero of all times." Others condolences came from included those from South African journalists as well as the Ahmed Kathrada Foundation, and Right2Know.

Suna was survived by her mother Christa, father Philip, sister Tessa, and brother Wilhelm. The SAPS is investigating her death, but the investigating officer told the family that her death was caused by heart failure.
