= Peter Paul Busuttil =

Maltese politician

- Pietru Pawl Busuttil

Mayor of Safi

Personal details
- Born: 1943
- Died: 28 June 2017 (aged 73–74)

Peter Paul Busuttil (or Pietru Pawl Busuttil in Maltese) (1943 – 28 June 2017) was a Maltese politician for the Nationalist Party.

In 1986, Busuttil was accused of the murder of Raymond Caruana, a Nationalist activist after shots were fired towards the Nationalist Club of Gudja. It later transpired that Busuttil was framed by thugs from the ruling Malta Labour Party with the aid of corrupt police officers.

He was the first-ever mayor of Hal Safi and served in such position for 18 years until 2012, when the Labour Party won over the council. Busuttil remained in the local council as a council member.

He died on 28 June 2017 at the age of 74.
