= Kevin Gatter =

English pathologist (1951–2017)

Kevin Gatter

Kevin Gatter (5 November 1951 – 22 June 2017) was an English pathologist who created a technique for identifying the source of cancer in the human body.

Gatter was the Head of the Department of Cellular Science at St John's College, Oxford and an internationally recognized expert in haematopathology.
