= Gwen Barlee =

Environmental activist

Patrica Gwen Barlee
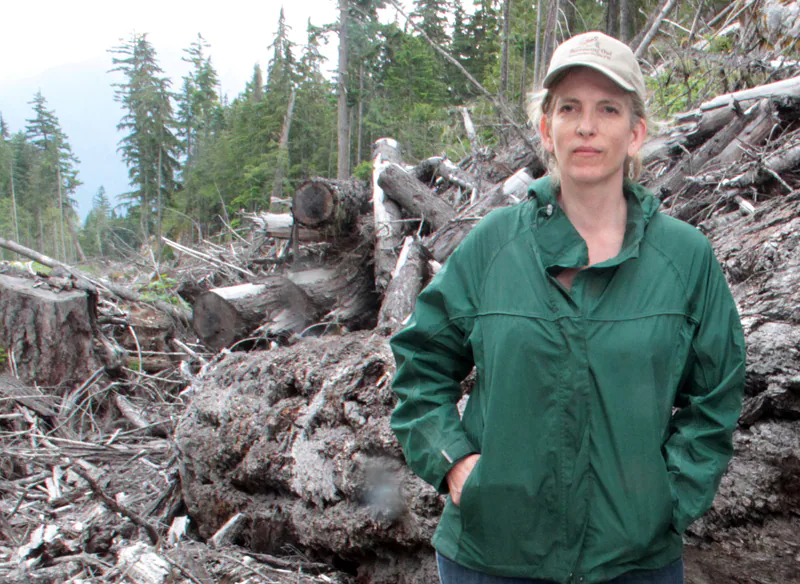
- Born: March 29, 1963; Penticton, British Columbia, Canada
- Died: June 21, 2017 (aged 54); Victoria, British Columbia, Canada
- Known for: Environmental Activist
- Memorials: Gwen Barlee Memorial Fund

Patrica Gwen Barlee (March 29, 1963 – June 21, 2017) was an environmental activist noted for her advocacy on environmental issues concerning endangered species, waterways, and provincial parks. She spent most of her environmentalist career pushing for standalone endangered species legislation in British Columbia. She is best known for her committed role to the Western Canada Wilderness Committee as national policy director (2001–2017) and participation in environmental campaigns for the British Columbia government to preserve tens of thousands of hectares for the northern spotted owl in 2011.

Barlee co-wrote a book titled In Defence of Canada's Spotted Owl with authors Andrew Miller and Devon Page, published by the Wilderness Committee. She had a vital role in the halt of government construction plans to build resorts in provincial and national parks. She also uncovered incident reports about the negative impacts of the industrial power stations on the environment, leading to a protest to prevent the privatization of waterways.

== Early life and education ==
Barlee was born March 29, 1963, in Penticton, British Columbia, and raised near Summerland in British Columbia's Okanagan region. Barlee was the daughter of Kathleen Kyle and Neville Langrell "Bill" Barlee, the second born of her siblings Veronica Barlee and Diane Barlee.

At the age of 5, Barlee's father quit his job as a high-school teacher to pursue a career in politics. In 1988 he was elected as a New Democratic Party (NDP) Member of the Legislative Assembly (MLA) in British Columbia and appointed Minister of Agriculture, Fisheries and Food.

Barlee studied visual arts at the Emily Carr University of Art and Design (formally known as Vancouver School of Decorative and Applied Arts). During postsecondary education, she worked as a model, a waitress at a hotel in Vancouver and as a blackjack dealer in Dawson City, Yukon. She served as a production assistant on multiple movies as well as the documentaries Toad People (2018) and Protecting BC’s Species at Risk (2012). She later completed a secondary degree in women's studies and political science at Langara College in Vancouver.

== Environmentalism ==
Barlee was the national policy director of the Wilderness Committee in British Columbia, where she fought legislation to create environmental preservation laws and protected many endangered species within Canada for over 15 years. The Wilderness Committees' objectives and goals are to preserve and protect biodiversity within Canada and produce public education for environmental issues, hazards and concerns. Barlee took part in many successful environmental campaigns and played a critical role in the halt in the construction of resorts in British Columbia provincial parks. She was known for her extensive Freedom of Information knowledge and ability to apply her knowledge to challenge provincial and federal legislation. She spent many years educating the public on current environmental issues through hosting and presenting at environmental and political conferences, guest speaking in youth classrooms, producing documentaries and publishing a book called “In Defence of Canada's Spotted Owl.” Due to Barlee’s many years of advocating for and defending the environment, she was nominated for the YWCA Women of Distinction Award in 2016.

=== Work for northern spotted owl ===
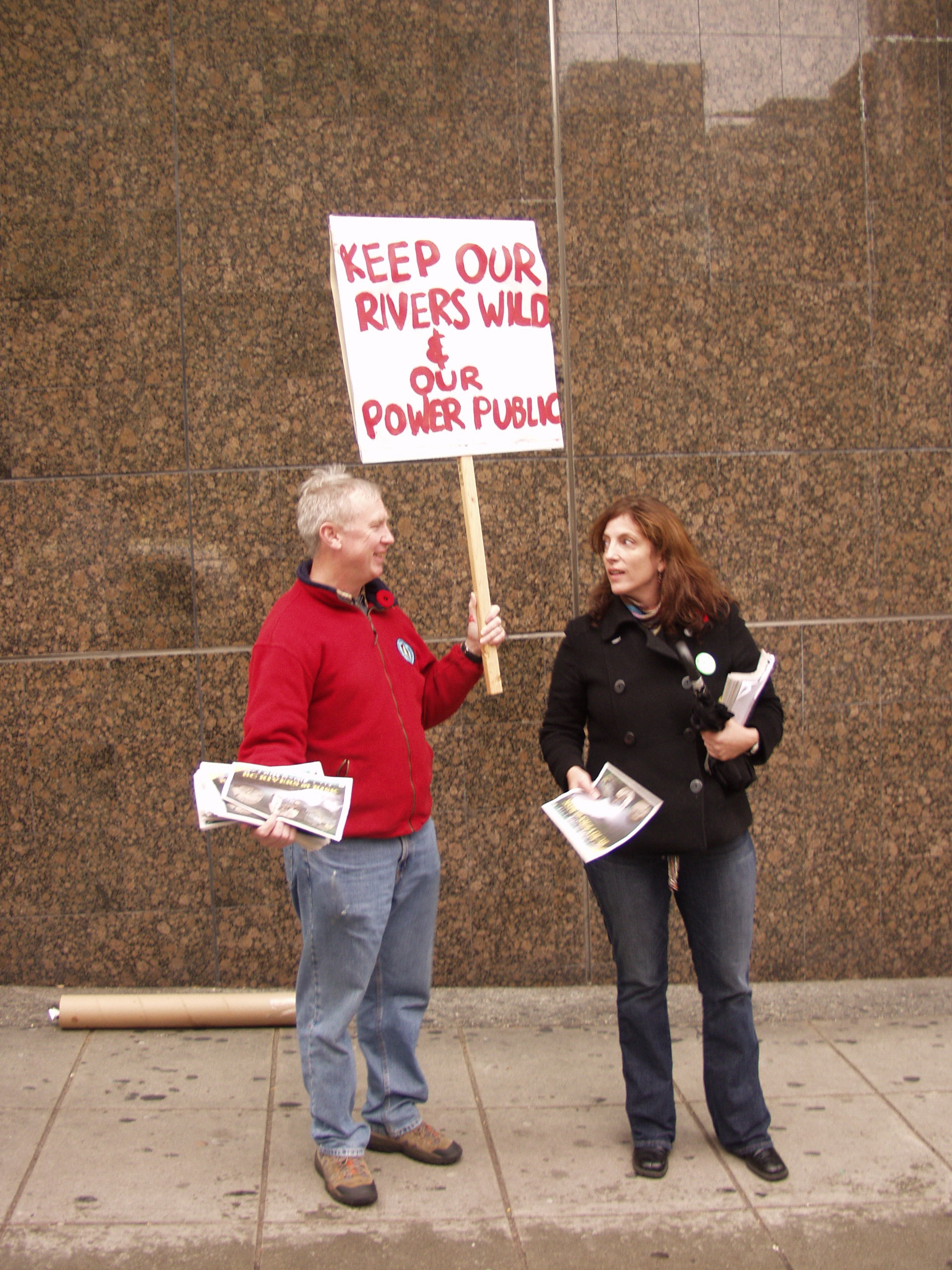
Barlee interacting with a protester who advocates against the privatization of waterways.

Barlee defended many endangered species and demanded the development of standalone endangered species legislation within British Columbia. She had a critical role in protecting the endangered species, the northern spotted owl, whose population continues to decline and is at significant risk of extinction. Matured and aged forests with large trees, a habitat suitable for the northern spotted owls, are being destroyed due to the industrial logging and forestry system, resulting in the species' vulnerability and exposure to the predatory barred owl. The northern spotted owl is primarily protected by the Endangered Species Act, prohibiting individuals from harming or injuring the species. Barlee and the team worked together to produce campaigns to protect and preserve the northern spotted owl and many endangered species, resulting in the British Columbia government setting aside over two hundred thousand hectares to preserve the northern spotted owl wildlife in 2011.

=== Work for waterways ===
During the mid-2000, Barlee began to advocate for the protection of wild rivers and against the British Columbia provincial government’s plans to privatize waterways for power projects. Privatizing waterways for power projects greatly impacts the environment as it permits the production of many power stations and industrial developments that correlate with the development of power stations, including the construction of roadways and transmission lines. Power stations ultimately change the river flow, having a wide range and lasting effects on ecosystems. Barlee uncovered incident reports stating the negative environmental impact of run-of-river hydro projects and released her findings to the public. She participated in many protests and helped educate people about the risks of privatization of waterways, motiving thousands to protect Upper Pitt Watershed, Bute Inlet rivers and Glacier and Howser from industrial hydro projects.

== Lyme Disease advocacy ==
In 2007, Barlee contracted Lyme disease, a disease that is transferred through the bite of black-legged ticks. Typical symptoms are fever, fatigue, headache, and erythema migraines. Ticks tend to be located in high elevations and moist habitats, traditionally in forests and tall grasslands, where Barlee likely contracted Lymes disease. She was an active participant in Lyme disease advocacy, as director for ten years and later vice president of the BC Freedom of Information and Privacy Association (FIPA). Barlee had valuable knowledge of the Freedom of Information that helped the FIPA to showcase the inaccuracies and failings in British Columbia’s provincial government testing methods for Lyme disease, resulting in the construction of a new clinic for chronic diseases with a focus on Lyme disease.

== Death and memorial ==
Barlee died at Victoria hospital on June 21, 2017, at age 54, a year after being diagnosed with cancer. While battling cancer, Barlee continued to advocate for the environment as months prior to her death, she showcased forty thousand signature petitions for the creation of provincial endangered species law. In memory of Barlee’s activism and active participation with the Wilderness Committee as national policy director for over 15 years, the Wilderness Committee established the Gwen Barlee Memorial Fund. The fund contributes to many of Barlee’s passions, such as: preserving the nature of British Columbia and Canadian parks, fighting for at-risk species and wild rivers, a new generation of environmental activists, and supporting indigenous communities.
