= Fernando Martínez Heredia =

Cuban politician (1939–2017)

Fernando Ramón Martínez Heredia (21 January 1939 – 12 June 2017) was a prominent Cuban revolutionary thinker and politician. Martínez was a founding member of the Cuban Communist Party, and as a member of the July 26 Movement, he took part in the Revolution which overthrow the Batista dictatorship.

After the Revolution, Martínez wrote many books and worked as head of the Philosophy Department at Havana University. Titular Academician of the Cuban Academy of Sciences. Doctor in Law, Full Professor at the Havana University, Senior Researcher. Specialist in Social Sciences, essayist and historian.

== Biography ==
=== Life and career ===
He was born on 21 January 1939 in Yaguajay, Las Villas, Cuba. His career as an educator began in the early years of the Revolution when he graduated as a teacher of the basic secondary school of Plan Fidel, teaching social sciences at the Lazo de la Vega School. Later as Professor of Philosophy at the University of Havana and director of its Department of Philosophy, from where he directed the magazine Pensamiento Crítico until its disappearance.

At the end of the 1960s, he participated as a member of the group that prepared the "plan for the universalization of teaching and access to higher education", and was also part of the group that was in charge of research on Higher Education. As a professor of postgraduate education, he gave courses and lectures on social issues in various institutions in the country and in nineteen other countries, in which he worked as a visiting professor or researcher.

A permanent researcher of the Cuban and Latin American reality, he participated in social research at the University of Havana, the Center for Western European Studies, the Center for American Studies and the Center for Interdisciplinary Humanities Research and the National Autonomous University of Mexico. He was a scientific collaborator of the Program of the Latin American Faculty of Social Sciences in Cuba; member of the "Ernesto Che Guevara" Professorship and of the Problems of the Current World Seminar of the Institute of Economic Research of the National Autonomous University of Mexico.

He worked at the Juan Marinello Cuban Institute for Cultural Research and chaired the "Antonio Gramsci" cathedra of studies.

=== Death ===
He died 12 June 2017 in Havana at the age of 78.

== Publications ==
With his criteria, he extraordinarily enriched the educational dialogue that characterized his interventions and publications, which in the order of more than two hundred articles and essays appear in specialized magazines in Cuba and abroad.

His investigative results also fed the texts that he edited as author or the more than ten books where he appears as co-author, among the latest titles are: "Socialismo liberación y democracia"; "La revolución cubana del 30" and "El ejercicio de pensar".

Active Bibliography

- La educación superior cubana. Autor principal, Ministerio de Educación, La Habana, 1972.
- Los gobiernos de Europa capitalista. Centro de Estudios sobre Europa Occidental, La Habana, 1977.
- Desafíos del socialismo cubano. Editorial Mestiza, México DF, 1988, Centro de Estudios sobre América, La Habana, 1988, Dialéctica, Buenos Aires, 1989 y con el título Cuba a treinta años del socialismo, Ediciones TAE, Montevideo, 1989.
- Che, el socialismo y el comunismo. Casa de las Américas, La Habana, 1989. Con el título El Che y el socialismo, Editorial Nuestro Tiempo, México DF, 1989 y Dialéctica, Buenos Aires, 1992.
- El mes más crudo de la siembra. Ensayos sobre historia de Nicaragua. Editora Política, La Habana, 1990, inédito.
- En el horno de los 90. Ediciones Barbarroja, Buenos Aires, 1999.
- Repenser le socialisme y Repensar el socialismo (ediciones en francés y en español), Editorial CIDIHCA, Montreal, 2001.
- El corrimiento hacia el rojo. Editorial Letras Cubanas, La Habana, 2002 y 2003.
- En el horno de los noventa. Edición 2005. Editorial Ciencias Sociales, La Habana, 2005, y con el título Socialismo, liberación y democracia. Ocean Sur/Ocean Press, Melbourne, 2006.
- La Revolución cubana del 30. Ensayos (1ra edición) Coedición con Editorial de Ciencias Sociales, La Habana, Cuba, 2007.
- El ejercicio de pensar (1ra edición) Coedición con Instituto Cubano de Investigación Cultural Juan Marinello, La Habana, Cuba, 2008.
- Andando en la historia. Coedición con Instituto Cubano de Investigación Cultural Juan Marinello, La Habana, Cuba, 2009.
- Autocríticas: un diálogo al interior de la tradición socialista. (Ruth Cuadernos de Pensamiento Crítico No. 1) Coedición con Editorial de Ciencias Sociales, La Habana, Cuba, 2009.
- A Viva Voz, Editorial de Ciencias Sociales, La Habana, 2010.
- El ejercicio de pensar (2da edición) Coedición con Editorial de Ciencias Sociales, La Habana, Cuba, 2010.
- El ejercicio de pensar (3ra edición). Coedición con Fundación Editorial el Perro y la Rana, Ministerio de Cultura, Caracas, Venezuela, 2010.
- Si breve…, Editorial Letras Cubanas, La Habana, 2010.
- Las ideas y la batalla del Che. Ruth Casa Editorial, 2010; Editorial de Ciencias Sociales, La Habana, 2012.
- A la mitad del camino. Editorial de Ciencias Sociales, La Habana, 2016.
- "La alternativa cubana", 2001.

He is co-author of the books:

- Lecturas de Filosofía, Universidad de La Habana, 1966.
- Lecturas de Filosofía, Instituto del Libro, La Habana, 1968, 2 ts. (contenido diferente).
- Los obreros hacen y escriben su historia, Ciencias Sociales, La Habana, 1975.
- Pensar al Che, CEA/Editorial José Martí, 1989-1992, 2 ts.
- Guevara para hoy, Erre emme Editori / Univ. Matanzas / CEA, La Habana, 1994.
- Attualitá del Che, Teti Editori/Editorial José Martí, 1997.
- Los caminos del Che, Dirple Ediciones, Buenos Aires, 1998.
- Che, il sovversivo, Data News, Roma, 1998.
- Laberintos de la utopía, Ediciones De mano en mano, Buenos Aires, 1999.
- Caminos de nuestra América, entrevistas realizadas por Andrés Cañas, Ediciones del Pensamiento Nacional, Buenos Aires, 1999.
- Oito visòes da América Latina, Organizador: Adauto Novaes, Editora Senac, Sao Paulo, 2006.
- La política cultural de la Revolución Cubana. Memoria y Reflexión. Centro Teórico-Cultural Criterios, La Habana, 2008.

He is the author of the articles (selection):

- "Necesitamos un pensamiento crítico", 2000.
- "La guerra de España revisitada", 1996.
- "¿Manifiestos?, ¿comunistas?", 1998.
- "Transición socialista y cultura: problemas actuales", 1990.
- "Anticapitalismo y problemas de la hegemonía", 1997.
- "Imperialismo, guerra y resistencia", 2003.
- "La alternativa cubana", 2001.
- "Ciencias sociales y ediciones", 2014.
- "Izquierda y marxismo en Cuba".
- "La filosofía en Cuba".
- "La fuerza del pueblo".
- "Imperialismo, guerra y resistencia".

He has numerous essays not included in books. Among those prior to 1996 are:

- "El ejercicio de pensar" (1967).
- "Colonialismo y cultura nacional" (1968);
- "Marx y el origen del marxismo" (1970).
- "Causas del ausentismo en el Central “Guiteras”" (1970).
- "Universidad y capitalismo neocolonial: el caso brasileño" (1972).
- "La teoría social de Carlos Marx" (1973, inédito).
- "Del “Punta Alegre” al “Máximo Gómez”" (1975).
- "El capitalismo europeo actual" (1977).
- "La ley 3 de la Sierra Maestra y la política agraria del Ejército Rebelde" (1978).
- "Neocolonialismo e imperialismo. Las relaciones neocoloniales de Europa en África" (1979).
- "La agricultura y la alimentación en el Tercer Mundo" (inédito, 1985).
- "La revolución agraria en la revolución cubana" (inédito, 1985).
- "Cristianismo y liberación. ¿Una revolución en el cristianismo?" (1986).
- "Experiencias de la toma revolucionaria del poder en Cuba" (1987).
- "El socialismo cubano: perspectivas y desafíos" (1990).
- "Pensar desde los movimientos populares" (1991).
- "Democracia, reformismo y revolución" (1992).
- "Dominación capitalista y proyectos populares en América Latina" (1993).
- "El socialismo en la actualidad: una visión cubana" (1993).
- "La viabilidad del socialismo en Cuba" (1993).
- "Problemas y perspectivas del pensamiento y las ciencias sociales" (1995).

Acknowledgments

He received numerous recognitions and decorations, but we will only highlight:

- Distinción "Por la Educación cubana".
- Distinción por la Cultura Nacional.
- Premio Ensayo de Casa de las Américas.
- Premio Nacional de Ciencias Sociales y Humanísticas 2006.
- Premio Nacional de Investigación Cultural 2015

Regarding the National Prize for Cultural Investigation received, he expressed in an interview with the journalist Lisdanys Alfonso Rivas:

"“ ...I continue to give my lectures one after the other... I can't stop working. In fact, this award is a challenge, an invitation to keep going, to keep improving. You must dedicate your time to what you do and what you know is useful, and sacrifice yourself if you are truly committed to the world you live in and the society that formed you...” "

Fernando Martínez Heredia
