= Tom Poole (barrister) =

First blind British barrister

Tom Poole

Frederick Thomas Poole MBE (26 September 1935 – 7 June 2017) was the first blind person in Britain to train and practice as a barrister.
