= Robert L. Kistler =

American politician (1925–2017)

Bob Kistler

Member of the Iowa House of Representatives
- In office 1989–1995

Personal details
- Born: March 4, 1925 Osceola, Iowa, United States
- Died: June 4, 2017 (aged 92)
- Party: Republican
- Occupation: educator

Robert Leo Kistler (March 4, 1925 – June 4, 2017) was an American politician in the state of Iowa. Kistler was born in Osceola, Iowa. He attended Simpson College, Drake University and University of Iowa, and was an educator. He served in the Iowa House of Representatives from 1989 to 1995, as a Republican.
