= Françoise Mailliard =

French fencer

Personal information
- Born: 18 December 1929 Orléans, France
- Died: 7 June 2017 (aged 87) Val-d'Isère, France

Sport
- Sport: Fencing

Françoise Mailliard (18 December 1929 – 7 June 2017) was a French fencer. She competed in the women's team foil event at the 1960 Summer Olympics.
