= George Badke =

American football player and coach

Biographical details
- Born: February 11, 1946
- Died: June 1, 2017 (aged 71)

Coaching career (HC unless noted)
- 1979–1980: North Central (IL)

Head coaching record
- Overall: 12–6 (college)

George Badke (February 11, 1946 – June 1, 2017) was an American football player and coach. He served as the head football coach at North Central College in Naperville, Illinois from 1979 to 1980, compiling a record of 12–6. Badke was the head football coach at St. Laurence High School of Burbank, Illinois, Fenwick High School in Oak Park, Illinois, and Brother Rice High School in Chicago, Illinois.

== Head coaching record ==
=== College ===
Year	Team	Overall	Conference	Standing	Bowl/playoffs
North Central Cardinals (College Conference of Illinois and Wisconsin) (1979–1980)
1979	North Central	6–3	5–3	T–4th	
1980	North Central	6–3	5–3	T–3rd	
North Central:		12–6	10–6		
Total:		12–6			
