= Myron Atkinson =

American politician (1927–2017)

Member of the North Dakota House of Representatives from the 32nd district
- In office 1969–1976

Personal details
- Born: September 22, 1927 Bismarck, North Dakota
- Died: June 12, 2017 (aged 89) Bismarck, North Dakota
- Party: Republican
- Spouse: Marge Atkinson
- Profession: lawyer, realtor

Myron H. Atkinson Jr. (September 22, 1927 – June 12, 2017) was an American politician who was a member of the North Dakota House of Representatives. As a Republican, he represented the 32nd district from 1969 to 1976. He was born in Bismarck, North Dakota and attended Bismarck Junior College and the University of North Dakota, where he received his J.D. degree. He was admitted to the North Dakota bar in 1951.
