= Hayden Morgan =

American politician (1933–2017)

John Hayden Morgan

Member of the Missouri House of Representatives
- In office 1971–1976

Personal details
- Born: November 7, 1933 Wichita Falls, Texas
- Died: June 7, 2017 (aged 83) Nevada, Missouri
- Party: Democratic
- Spouse: Jennie B. George (m. 1953)
- Children: 3 (2 sons, 1 daughter)
- Occupation: grain and livestock farmer, Army officer

John Hayden Morgan (November 7, 1933 – June 7, 2017) was an American politician who served in the Missouri House of Representatives.

== Career ==
He was first elected to the Missouri House of Representatives in 1970. He was educated at Wichita Falls, Texas, elementary schools, the New Mexico Military Institute, and the West Texas State University. Morgan served in the U.S. Army between 1955 and 1957. In 1961, when the Berlin Wall was built, he was recalled to active service and was promoted from first lieutenant to captain. He moved to Nevada, Missouri, in 1965.
