= Patricia Goldsmith =

English painter, printmaker, illustrator and draughtsman

- Born: 27 March 1929; Hove, Sussex, England
- Died: 9 June 2017 (aged 88)
- Education: Brighton College of Art; Royal Academy Schools
- Known for: Painting; printmaking; illustration; drawing

Patricia Goldsmith (27 March 1929 – 9 June 2017) was an English painter, printmaker, illustrator and draughtsman.

== Life and work ==
Born in Hove, Sussex in 1929, Patricia Goldsmith attended Brighton and Hove High School before enrolling at Brighton College of Art in 1947 where she was awarded a National Diploma in Design and an Arts Teacher Diploma. She went on to study art at the Royal Academy Schools, London from 1951 to 1955.

Among the many prestigious institutions that have exhibited her work include the Royal Portrait Society, the Royal West of England Academy and the Royal Academy Summer Exhibitions. She has also exhibited at the Sussex Artists, Marlborough Artists, South West Academy of Fine Art.

Goldsmith died on 9 June 2017 at the age of 88.

== Other sources ==
- Marlborough Open Studios
