= Bandalised =

Studio album by Vin Garbutt
- Released: 1994
- Genre: Folk
- Length: 54:34
- Label: Home Roots Music

Vin Garbutt chronology
The By-Pass Syndrome (1991)	Bandalised (1994)	Plugged! (1995)

Bandalised is a 1994 folk music album by Vin Garbutt.

== Track listing ==
1. England My England
2. The Catholic Boy/Imelda Rolands Reel/The Green Gates
3. Jessie the Flower of Dunblane
4. The Humours of Twizziegill/Hitler's Downfall/The Rambling Pitchfork
5. Be as Children
6. The Reluctant Hedgehog/The Mooncoin Reel
7. Lough Sheelin Side
8. Michelle Flynn's Hornpipe/The Squeaky Chair/The Willow Tree
9. Philippino Maid
10. The Wilderness Road
11. The Songbird
12. The Copperplate Jig/Ann Bewick's Pies/The Virginia Reel
13. The Rose of Tralee
14. The Blackbird Hornpipe/The Other Fairy Hornpipe/The Hummersea Slide
15. Reprise: The Wilderness Road
