= Joan Bicknell =

- Born: 10 April 1939; Isleworth, London, United Kingdom
- Died: 12 June 2017 (aged 78); Stalbridge, Dorset, United Kingdom

Joan Bicknell (10 April 1939 – 12 June 2017) was Britain's first female psychiatry professor. She worked at St George's, University of London and pioneered the area of learning disability. She confronted cruelty at psychiatric hospitals and was a human rights advocate of institutionalized people with intellectual disabilities, unpopular with and never accepted by the medical establishment. She introduced multidisciplinary hospital management and community-based care.

== Early life and education ==
Joan Bicknell was born into a working-class family in Isleworth, London. Her father Albert worked as a bricklayer, later in bomb disposal with Royal Engineers. Her mother, Dorothy (née Smith), was a secretary. She had an older brother, Edward, who died as a teacher in Swaziland. She also had two fostered brothers with intellectual disabilities. Bicknell attended Twickenham County School for Girls and studied medicine at Birmingham University in 1962.

== Career ==
After graduation she worked with children at Ilesha Wesley Guild hospital in Oyo, Nigeria as a Methodist missionary. When the Nigerian Civil War began in 1967, she left for Sierra Leone to work with the flying doctor service. She returned to the UK to study psychiatry at Queen Mary's Hospital, in Carshalton, a hospital for long-term care of children in Surrey. In 1969, she obtained a diploma in psychological medicine, and in 1971 she completed a thesis on causes and prevalence of lead poisoning in institutionalised children. She became a consultant psychiatrist at Botleys Park Hospital in Chertsey, Surrey. In 1978, she was appointed to a task force modernising psychiatric care at Normansfield Hospital. She introduced managing a hospital through a multidisciplinary team rather than, as was then customary, a Medical Superintendent.

Eventually Bicknell was awarded a professorship at St George's, University of London and became Britain's first female professor in psychiatry. In her inaugural lecture 19 November 1980 called "psychopathology of handicap" she dealt with the family's reaction to the diagnosis of intellectual disability drawing an analogy to the stages of grief in the bereavement process.

Bicknell concentrated on humanising care of people with intellectual disabilities. She took a position in bioethical hot spots years before others like the sterilization of minors with developmental disabilities in 1988, compared to the American Academy of Pediatrics for example in 1990.

Her approach challenged the expectation that people were better not cared for in their own homes and meant that Bicknell was never part of the medical establishment.

== Personal life ==
Bicknell had asthma and other health problems, eventually mental illness. She retired early at age 50. She moved to Dorset county with her partner Diana Worsley, owning a farm for children with disabilities to have contact with animals. She died of cancer in Stalbridge in Dorset county.

== Legacy ==
In 1990, the Psychiatry of Disability Division at St George's Hospital Medical School, established the Joan Bicknell Prize for the best essay on an aspect of the Psychiatry of Disability written and presented by a registrar and senior registrar. A building in Tooting, London was named Joan Bicknell Centre.
