= Nikolai Zhugan =

Hero of the Soviet Union (1917–2017)

- Николай Жуган
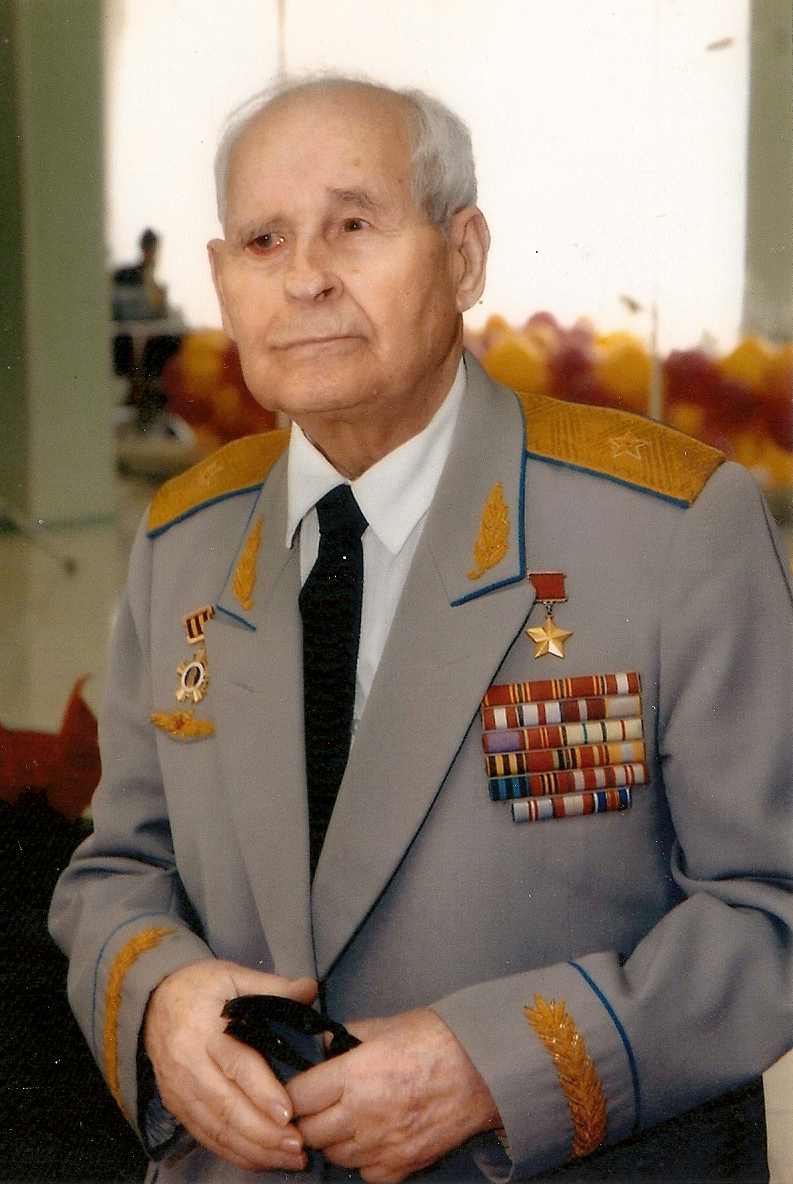
- Zhugan in c. 2013
- Born: 23 February 1917; 1st Nikolaevka, Ananyevsky uezd, Kherson Governorate, Russian Empire
- Died: 22 June 2017 (aged 100); Krasnodar, Russia

Nikolai Pavlovich Zhugan (Russian: Никола́й Па́влович Жуга́н; 23 February 1917 – 22 June 2017) was a Soviet and Russian Air Force major general, a pilot during World War II, and Hero of the Soviet Union (1944).

== Biography ==
Zhugan born on 23 February 1917 in the village of 1st Nikolaevka, Ananiev District of Kherson province (now Berezivka Raion, Odesa Oblast of Ukraine).

He graduated from the seven grades of school, then flight-gliding school in Kharkov. In 1938, Zhugan was called up for service in the Workers and Peasants Red Army. In the same year he graduated from the Odessa Military Aviation Pilot School. From the first days of the Great Patriotic War, he was on its front.

By April 1944, Guards Captain Nikolai Zhugan link commanded the 10th Guards Regiment of the 3rd Guards Air Division 3rd Guards Air Corps ADD USSR. By the time he made 242 sorties in the exploration and bombing of the important objects of the enemy in its hinterland.

Decree of the Supreme Soviet of the USSR on 19 August 1944, for exemplary performance of command assignments at the front of the struggle against the German invaders and for displaying courage and heroism Guard Captain Nikolai Zhugan was awarded the Hero of the Soviet Union, a high rank with the Order of Lenin and medal Gold Star under the number 4362.

After the war until November 1948, he continued to serve in the long-range aviation commander of an aviation squadron bomber regiment. In 1949, he graduated from the Higher officer flight-school tactical commanders long-range aviation. In 1949, he was appointed deputy commander of the 184th Guards Bomber Aviation Regiment (Priluki), in 1952 – commander of the 238th Guards Bomber Aviation Regiment (Zhitomir). Since 1955, he served as deputy commander of the 15th Guards Heavy Bomber Division (Zhitomir), and from April 1956 appointed commander of the 53rd Heavy Bomber Division (airfield Belaya, Usolsky District of the Irkutsk Oblast).

In December 1958, Colonel Zhugan graduated from the higher academic courses at the military academy of the General Staff. In January 1959 he was appointed commander of the 45th Heavy Bomber Division (Baranavichy, Brest Oblast, Belarus). In 1960, with the rank of major general aviation, Zhugan was discharged.

Zhugan lived in Krasnodar and was engaged in social activities, including the regional Veterans Council. He was an Honorary Citizen of Krasnodar. He turned 100 in February 2017.
