= Word of Mouth (Vin Garbutt album) =

Studio album by Vin Garbutt
- Released: 1999
- Genre: Folk
- Length: 55:28
- Label: Home Roots Music

Vin Garbutt chronology
When The Tide Turns Again (1998)	Word of Mouth (1999)	The Vin Garbutt Songbook Vol 1 (2003)

Word of Mouth is a 1999 folk music album by Vin Garbutt.

== Track listing ==
1. City of Angels
2. Forty Thieves
3. Dark Side of the Moon
4. John You Have Gone
5. Tunes: Wilfy Mannion's Jig/The Wild Irishman/Jamie's Christening
6. Sarajevo
7. The Truth is Irresistible
8. Waits and Weeps
9. Beyond the Pale
10. The Beggar's Bridge
11. Time and Tide
12. The Troubles of Erin
