= George Joseph (diplomat) =

Indian diplomat (1950–2017)

George Joseph (15 October 1950 – 1 June 2017) was an Indian career diplomat who served as India's Ambassador to Turkmenistan from 1997 to 2001, Ambassador to Qatar from October 2005 to January 2009 and Ambassador to Bahrain from January 2009 until October 2010.

Joseph entered the Indian foreign service in 1975. He was posted to the embassy in Riyadh, Saudi Arabia, and served as consul general at the Indian consulate in Dubai, United Arab Emirates. He also served as the Indian Ambassador to Turkmenistan, based in Ashgabat, from 15 July 1997, until 28 November 2001.

Joseph served as India's envoy to Qatar from October 2005 to January 2009. He introduced a monthly open house at the Embassy of India in Doha, a gesture of soft diplomacy which proved popular with Indian expatriates and Qatari nationals. He also intervened on behalf of stranded or detained Indians. In one instance, two Indian nationals who were accused of the murder of an Indonesian maid were sentenced to death. Through Joseph's intervention, their sentences were commuted to life in prison in March 2011.

Joseph next served as Ambassador to Bahrain from January 2009 until October 2010. He retired from the Ministry of External Affairs after the end of his posting in Bahrain.

George Joseph, who suffered from kidney disease, died at a hospital in Kochi, Kerala, India, on 1 June 2017, at the age of 66. He was survived by his wife, Rani, and their daughter, Renu. His funeral and burial was held at St. John The Baptist Catholic Church in Nedumkunnam, Changanassery, Kerala.
