= John Francis Talling =

British limnologist

John 'Jack' Francis Talling FRS (23 March 1929 in Grangetown, North Yorkshire – 20 June 2017) was a limnologist who contributed to our understanding of the River Nile, the great lakes of the African Rift Valley and those of the English Lake District. He was also an authority on the ecophysiology of freshwater phytoplankton.

He was elected Fellow of the Royal Society in 1978.
