= Maurice Peatros =

American baseball player

- First baseman
- Born: May 22, 1927; Pittsburgh, Pennsylvania, U.S.
- Died: June 25, 2017 (aged 90); San Jacinto, California, U.S.
- Batted: Left Threw: Left

Negro league baseball debut
- 1947, for the Homestead Grays

Last appearance
- 1947, for the Homestead Grays

Teams
- Homestead Grays (1947)

Maurice Trueheart Peatros (May 22, 1927 – June 25, 2017) was an American Negro league first baseman.

A native of Pittsburgh, Pennsylvania, Peatros attended Westinghouse High School. In 1947, he played for the Homestead Grays. He went on to play minor league baseball into the 1950s with such clubs as the Geneva Robins, Erie Sailors, and Magic Valley Cowboys. Peatros died in San Jacinto, California in 2017 at age 90.
