= Mirjam Blaak =

Ugandan politician (born 1956)

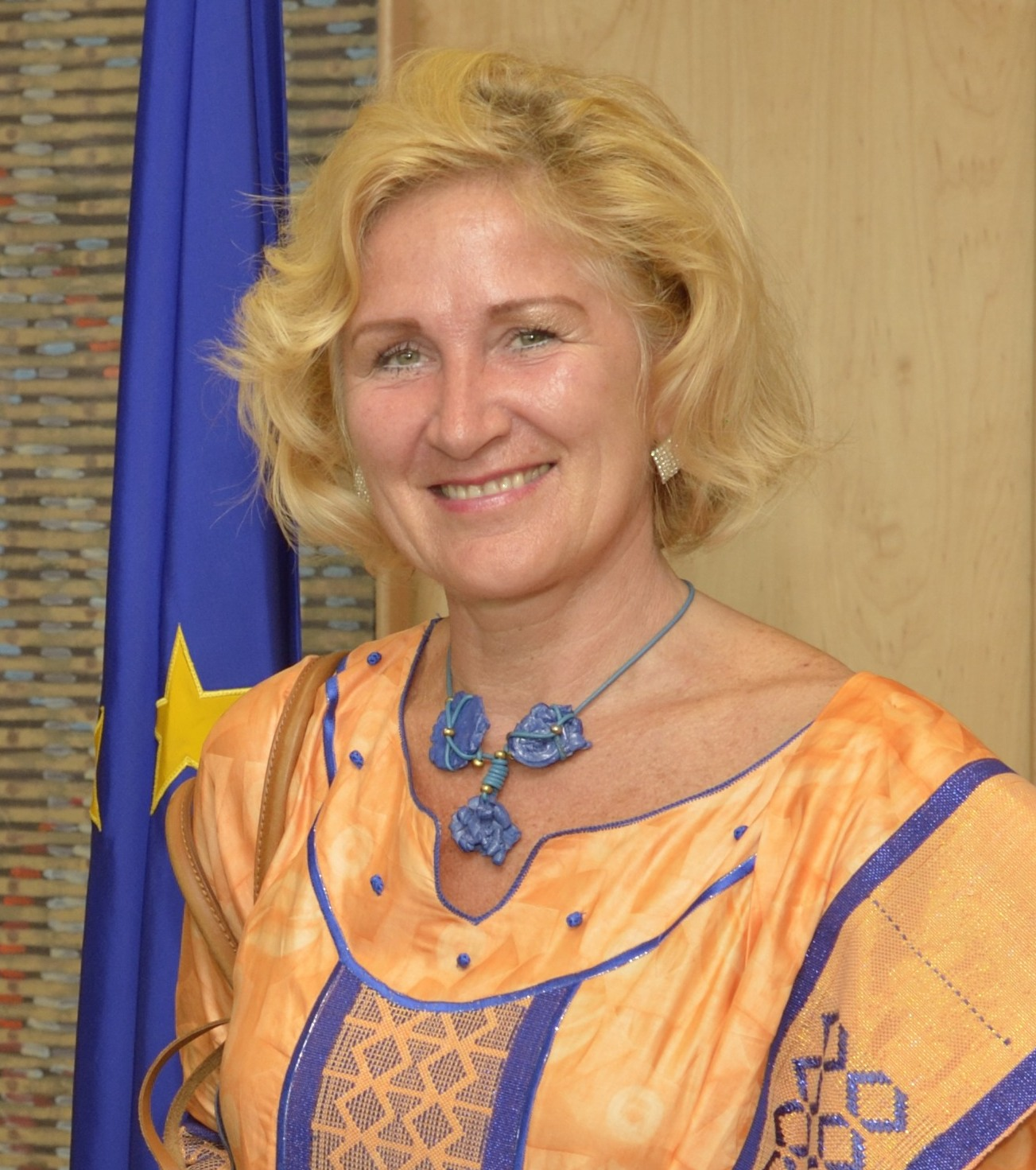
- Blaak in 2013

Ugandan Ambassador to Belgium
- Incumbent
- Assumed office 2013

Personal details
- Born: 1956 (age 69–70) The Netherlands
- Citizenship: Uganda
- Party: National Resistance Movement
- Spouse: Ronald Batta (died 2004)
- Children: 2

Mirjam Blaak (born 1956) is the Netherlands-born Ugandan Ambassador to Belgium, the Netherlands, Luxembourg and the EU. She is a member of the National Resistance Movement, the party led by Yoweri Museveni that has been in power since 1986.

== Education & Career ==
Blaak earned a Master of Laws degree at Utrecht University before working as a Protection Officer with UNHCR in Nairobi. When she became Deputy Ambassador to Brussels in 2003, she voluntarily relinquished her Dutch citizenship to become a Ugandan citizen.

She married NRM fighter Ronald Batta (1950–2004), and they had two sons. Before Museveni came to power, she helped Janet Museveni and her children get asylum in Sweden. She has defended Ugandan human rights violations and the presence of safe houses in Uganda.

== Controversy ==
Blaak has downplayed the use of safe houses for human rights violation in Uganda: "I know there are safe houses, but I don't know if people are tortured there. I think safe houses exist everywhere, not just in Uganda".

At the International Court of Justice, where she represented Uganda, she denied that human rights violations were a daily occurrence in Uganda. The Ugandan house and office of the whistleblower were raided shortly after.

When Muhammad Ssegirinya was admitted to the Alexandra Medical Center for treatment of his torture wounds, she told a journalist "What he is being treated for does not indicate torture".

During the Uganda Day celebration on 30 August 2025 her Embassy Officer in Charge of Diaspora Affairs Titus Seruga allegedly attacked an opposition activist called Nico Schoonderwoerd. Seruga allegedly prevented police arrest by claiming Diplomatic Immunity. Blaak announced she is investigating the incident.
