= Ray Franklin =

United States Marine Corps general

- Born: 7 May 1934; Miles City, Montana, U.S.
- Died: 11 June 2017 (aged 83); Sequim, Washington, U.S.
- Military career
- Allegiance: United States
- Branch: United States Marine Corps
- Service years: 1956–1980s
- Rank: Major general
- Commands: Marine Corps Research, Development and Acquisition Command

Ray "M" Franklin (7 May 1934 – 11 June 2017) was a major general in the United States Marine Corps who served as commanding general of the Marine Corps Research, Development and Acquisition Command.
