= When the Tide Turns =

When The Wide Turns

Studio album by Vin Garbutt
- Released: 1989
- Genre: Folk
- Length: 43:30
- Label: Home Roots Music

Vin Garbutt chronology
Shy Tot Pommy (1985)	When The Wide Turns (1989)	The By-Pass Syndrome (1991)

When the Tide Turns is a 1989 folk music album by Vin Garbutt.

== Track listing ==
1. Where the Hell are we Going to Live
2. When the Tide Turns
3. The Ballad of John Pearson
4. Lady Anne Montgomery
5. Nica Nicaragua
6. Absent Friends
7. The Jolly Butchers/The London Lassies
8. Carol Anne Kelly
9. Not for the First Time
10. I Wouldn't Have One Myself
11. The Secret
