= Pavel Dalaloyan =

Russian footballer

Personal information
- Full name: Pavel Razmikovich Dalaloyan
- Date of birth: 22 November 1978
- Date of death: 22 June 2017 (aged 38)
- Place of death: Voronezh, Russia
- Height: 1.82 m (5 ft 11 1/2 in)
- Position: Forward

Senior career*
Years	Team	Apps	(Gls)
1998	FC Kuban Slavyansk-na-Kubani	37	(11)
1999	FC Lokomotiv Liski	31	(7)
2000	FC Uralan Elista	4	(0)
2000	FC Metallurg Lipetsk	5	(0)
2001–2002	FC Krasnodar-2000	50	(10)
2003	FC Lokomotiv Liski (amateur)		
2004	FC Slavyansk Slavyansk-na-Kubani	6	(2)
2004–2005	FC Dynamo Voronezh (amateur)		
2006	FC Dynamo Voronezh	13	(1)
2011–2012	FC Khopyor Novokhopyorsk		
- * Club domestic league appearances and goals

Pavel Razmikovich Dalaloyan (Russian: Павел Размикович Далалоян; 22 November 1978 – 22 June 2017) was a Russian football player.

== Career ==
Danaloyan played football for FC Lokomotiv Liski before joining FC Uralan Elista where he would make 4 Russian Premier League appearances.

== Death ==
Dalaloyan was killed when a motorist struck him as he was walking on a sidewalk in Voronezh.
