= Vin Garbutt =

English folk singer and songwriter

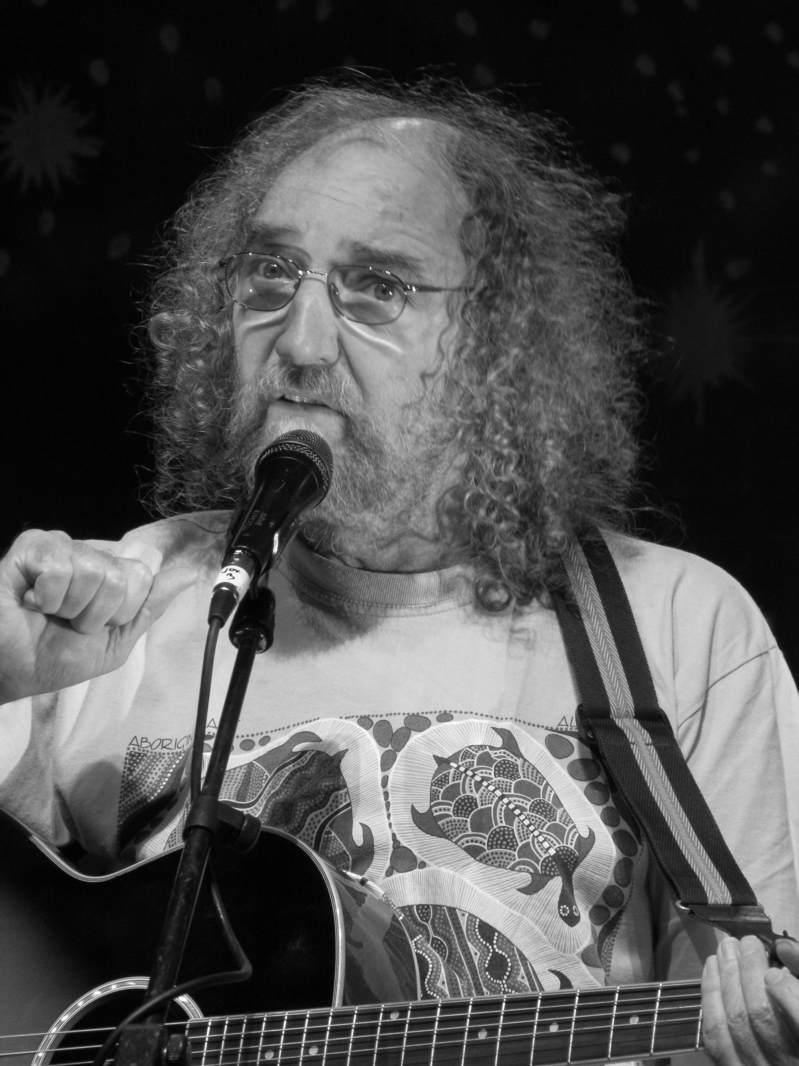
- Garbutt in 2010 at the National Folk Festival

Background information
- Born: Vincent Paul Garbutt; 20 November 1947; Middlesbrough, England
- Origin: South Bank, Teesside, North Riding of Yorkshire
- Died: 6 June 2017 (aged 69) Middlesbrough, England
- Genre: Folk music
- Instruments: guitar, tin whistle, voice
- Years active: 1970s to 2017
- Website: https://www.vingarbutt.com

Vincent Paul Garbutt (20 November 1947 – 6 June 2017) was an English folk singer and songwriter. A significant part of his repertoire consisted of protest songs covering topics such as "the Troubles" in Northern Ireland (Welcome Home Howard Green, Troubles of Erin, To Find Their Ulster Peace), unemployment, and social issues. Whilst the subject of his songs featured many political and social topics, Garbutt's on stage wit, humour and storytelling between songs became a hit with audiences and for which he became widely known. He would wish his audiences "All the very best" along with, "I'm knackered now, aren't you?"

== Early life ==
Garbutt was born in Coral Street, South Bank, Middlesbrough, England, the son of an English father and an Irish mother. Although his first live performances were in a pop covers band called The Mystics, he discovered folk music while he was still at school and began visiting and performing at the Rifle Club in Cannon Street, Middlesbrough, and later at Eston Folk Club closer to his home.

After leaving school he initially enrolled on a six-month commercial course but was encouraged to become an apprentice at the Imperial Chemical Industries (ICI) Wilton chemical plant, near to his home. During this period he visited Ireland in search of his musical roots.

Aged 21, he became a professional musician. With the rich repertoire of songs he had amassed, he and five friends spent the first summer busking his way around the bars of Spain's Mediterranean coast and on to Morocco via Gibraltar. It was then that he found he had a talent for songwriting. Back in England in 1972 he recorded his first album for Bill Leader, The Valley of Tees, which established him as a singer-songwriter. His witty patter was often longer than the amount of time singing.

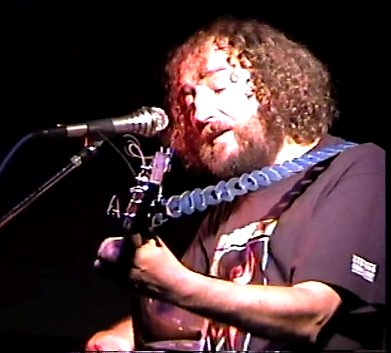
Garbutt on stage in Hobart, Tasmania, March 1994

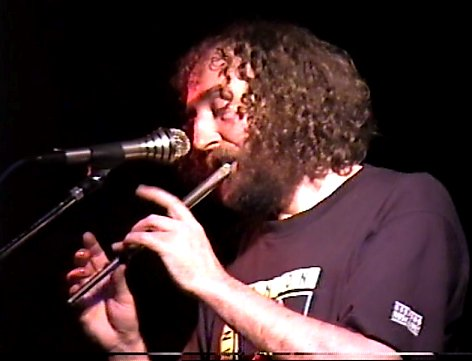
Garbutt playing the tin whistle on stage in Hobart, Tasmania, March 1994

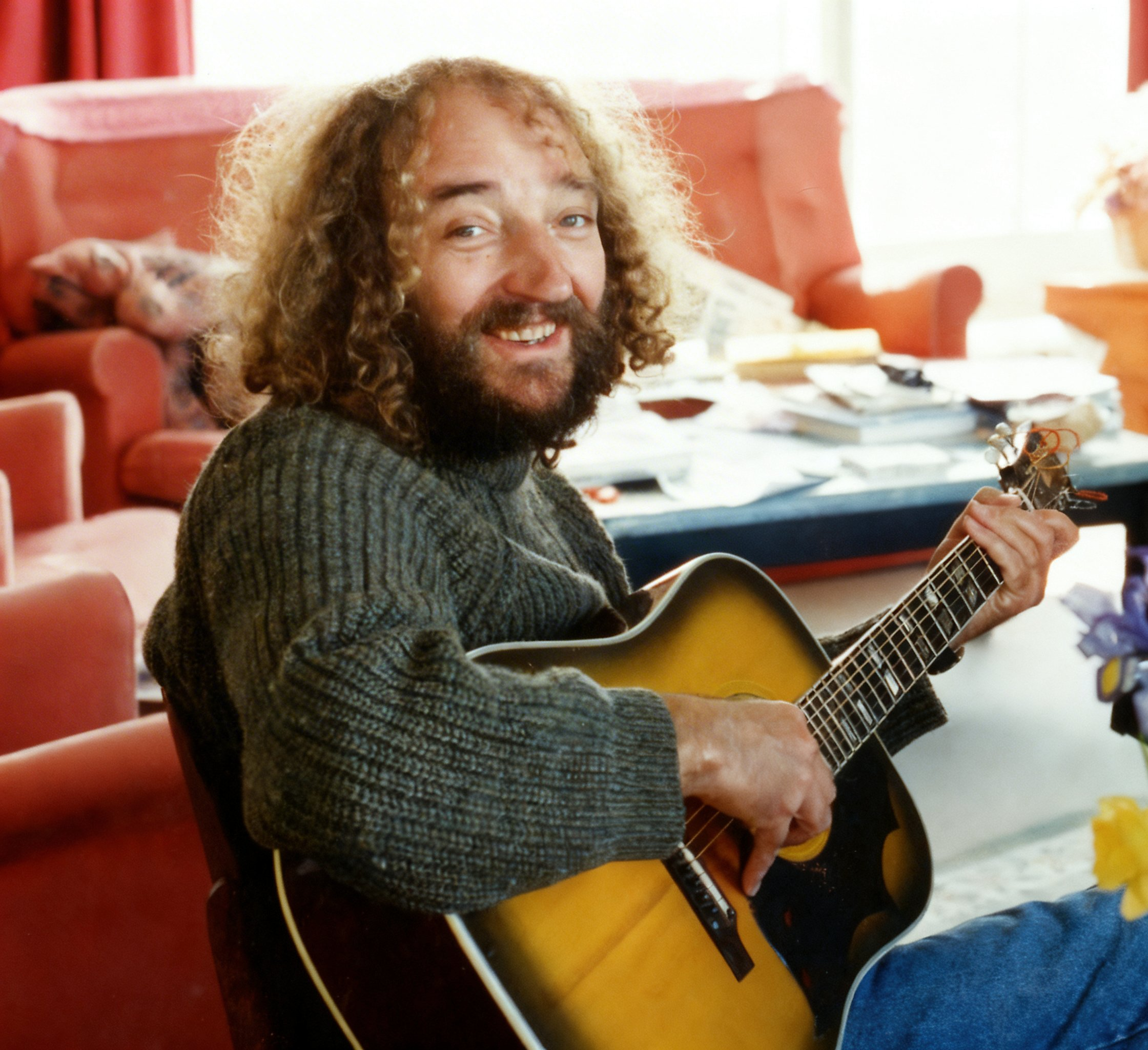
Garbutt relaxing during a 1994 Australian tour

== Later years and death ==
In 1999, Garbutt toured the Far East, Australia and New Zealand, followed by his "Take It Easy after 30 Years on the Road" tour of the UK. He also released the Word of Mouth CD.

During 2001, Garbutt published the first collection of his songs, The Vin Garbutt Songbook. The collection spans his career from "The Valley of Tees" written in 1971 to "The Troubles of Erin" written in 1999. Shortly afterwards, the companion CD was issued, Garbutt's first ever compilation CD and another world tour followed in 2004.

A health check highlighted a minor health problem but in early 2005, on a sabbatical trip to Spain, his condition deteriorated. On his return to England he was hospitalised and a repair made to one of his heart valves. He then made a full recovery and got back on the road. In his recuperation period he worked on his album Persona … Grata which was launched at The Sage Gateshead on 6 October 2005. In 2006, filmmaker Craig Hornby began filming a documentary on Vin's life. The end result, 'Vin Garbutt-Teesside Troubadour' was premiered at Cineworld Middlesbrough (now Odeon-Luxe) and screened for a week in November 2010. It was also screened at the Sage-Gateshead in 2011. Vin continued to perform extensively until his death following heart surgery on 6 June 2017.

Garbutt was working on an autobiography, All The Very Best, during the four years before his death. The book was published posthumously in autumn 2021.

== Awards ==
In 2001, Garbutt won the "Best Live Act" award at the BBC Radio 2 Folk Awards, and was nominated for "Folk Singer of the Year" (with the award going to Norma Waterson). Later that year, he was awarded an Honorary Degree of Master of Arts by the Teesside University.

In 2007, he was nominated for "Best Live Act" again at the BBC Radio 2 Folk Awards, with the award going to Bellowhead.

== Discography ==
- The Valley of Tees (1972)
- The Young Tin Whistle Pest (live) (1974)
- King Gooden (1976)
- Eston California (1977)
- Tossin' a Wobbler (1978)
- Little Innocents (1983)
- Shy Tot Pommy (1985) [live – Mount Isa, Queensland, Australia]
- When The Tide Turns (1989)
- The By-Pass Syndrome (1991)
- Bandalised (1994)
- Plugged! (1995) [live – Red Lion Folk Club, Birmingham, UK.]
- When the Tide Turns Again (1998) [reissue of 1989 album with one additional track]
- Word of Mouth (1999)
- The Vin Garbutt Songbook Vol 1 (2003)
- Persona ... Grata (2005)
- ''Vin Garbutt-Teesside Troubadour'' Documentary feature & live DVD (2011)
- Synthetic Hues (2014)
