= Héctor Ríos Ereñú =

Argentine military officer

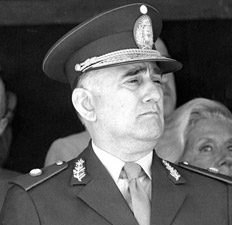
Ríos Ereñú in 1985

Héctor Ríos Ereñú (19 October 1930 – 20 June 2017) was an Argentine military officer.

Ríos Ereñú was born in 1930 in Rosario, Santa Fe, graduated from the Military College in 1951 and belonged to the infantry division. He was appointed Chief of Defense Staff in March 1985 by President Raúl Ricardo Alfonsín, the third general to hold the position since the restoration of democracy. During his administration, he had to face the Carapintada uprising of officers, led by Aldo Rico, in April 1987. Ríos Ereñú was forced to resign after the uprising, as discipline in the ranks was restored. In December 2013, he was sentenced to life imprisonment, along with six other defendants, for crimes against humanity committed in Salta in 1975. Ríos Ereñú was convicted of kidnapping and murder of Peronist military officer Jorge Santillán. He was granted house arrest due to his delicate health in 2017, and died on 20 June aged 86.
