= Deaths in March 2017 =

The following is a list of notable deaths in March 2017.

Entries for each day are listed alphabetically by surname. A typical entry lists information in the following sequence:

- Name, age, country of citizenship at birth, subsequent country of citizenship (if applicable), reason for notability, cause of death (if known), and reference.

== March 2017 ==
=== 1 ===
- P. J. Bradley, 76, Northern Irish politician, MLA (1998–2011).
- Tania Dalton, 45, New Zealand netball player (national team), brain aneurysm.
- Dai Morgan Evans, 73, British archaeologist, cancer.
- Paula Fox, 93, American writer (The Slave Dancer, Desperate Characters).
- Pierre Guénin, 90, French journalist, magazine publisher and gay rights activist.
- John Hampshire, 76, English cricketer (Yorkshire, national team).
- Raajesh Johri, 64, Indian singer-songwriter, cardiac arrest.
- Hiroshi Kamayatsu, 78, Japanese singer and guitarist (The Spiders), pancreatic cancer.
- Richard Karron, 82, American actor (The Flintstones in Viva Rock Vegas, Ready to Rumble, History of the World, Part I).
- Shiv K. Kumar, 95, Indian English poet, playwright, novelist, and short story writer.
- Yasuyuki Kuwahara, 74, Japanese footballer, Olympic bronze medalist (1968), pneumonia.
- Johannes Lahti, 64, Finnish Olympic decathlete (1976, 1980).
- Tarak Mehta, 87, Indian playwright and humorist.
- Gustav Metzger, 90, German-born stateless auto-destructive artist.
- Alicia Morel, 95, Chilean author.
- Pamela Neville-Sington, 57, American literary biographer, pancreatic cancer.
- Shirley Palesh, 87, American baseball player (AAGPBL).
- Michael M. Ryan, 87, American actor (Another World, Remo Williams: The Adventure Begins, Tootsie).
- Jins Shamsuddin, 81, Malaysian actor (Bidasari), director and politician, member of the Dewan Negara (2004–2008), choked.
- Alejandra Soler, 103, Spanish activist and school teacher.
- Tomaso Staiti di Cuddia delle Chiuse, 84, Italian politician and journalist.
- Vladimir Tadej, 91, Croatian filmmaker.
- Joseph Vũ Duy Thống, 64, Vietnamese Roman Catholic prelate, Bishop of Phan Thiết (since 2009).
- Ioannis Tsintsaris, 55, Greek Olympic weightlifter.

=== 2 ===
- Usayd al-Adani, Yemeni Al-Qaeda leader, airstrike.
- Jerry Baker, 85, American author.
- Tarcisio Catanese, 49, Italian football player and manager, heart attack.
- Édouard Close, 87, Belgian politician, Burgemeester of Liège (1976–1991).
- Tommy Gemmell, 73, Scottish football player (Celtic, Dundee, national team) and manager.
- LaRue Harrington, 59, American football player (San Diego Chargers), heart attack.
- Simon Hobday, 76, South African golfer.
- Andrés Ocaña, 62, Spanish politician, Mayor of Córdoba (2009–2011).
- Wally Pikal, 90, American musician.
- David Rubinger, 92, Austrian-born Israeli photographer.
- Howard Schmidt, 67, American cybersecurity advisor, cancer.
- John D. Schneider, 80, American state legislator and attorney, member of the Missouri Senate (1971–2002).
- Josef Schnyder, 94, Swiss Olympic cross-country skier.
- Mohamed Tahar, 36–37, Yemeni Guantanamo Bay detention camp prisoner, airstrike.

=== 3 ===
- Steve Adams, 57, English footballer (Boston United).
- A. J. Baker, 94, Australian philosopher.
- Ray T. Chesbro, 91, American politician.
- Míriam Colón, 80, Puerto Rican-American actress (Scarface, Goal!, All the Pretty Horses), pulmonary infection.
- Bernardo Cortés, 83, Spanish humorist, street singer-songwriter and writer.
- Bramwell Cook, 81, New Zealand gastroenterologist.
- Luvsanlkhagvyn Dashnyam, 76, Mongolian Olympic speed skater (1964, 1968, 1972).
- Alice Louise Davison, 76, American linguist.
- Jim Fuller, 69, American guitarist (The Surfaris).
- Dame Anne Griffiths, 84, British librarian and archivist.
- Nathan George, 80, American actor (Klute. One Flew Over the Cuckoo's Nest, Short Eyes).
- Frances Hargreaves, 62, South African-born Australian actress (Number 96).
- Raymond Kopa, 85, French footballer (Real Madrid, national team).
- Misha Mengelberg, 81, Ukrainian-born Dutch jazz pianist and composer.
- Michael P. Mitchell, 91, American politician.
- Cyprian Ojwang Omollo, Kenyan politician, MP (2007–2013).
- Basil O'Rourke, 87, Australian rules footballer (Richmond).
- Tommy Page, 46, American singer-songwriter ("I'll Be Your Everything") and music industry executive (Reprise Records, Billboard), suicide.
- Mary Parry, 87, British figure skater, European championship bronze medalist (1960).
- Jack Petoskey, 95, American football player and coach.
- René Préval, 74, Haitian politician, Prime Minister (1991), President (1996–2001, 2006–2011).
- Henriette Rasmussen, 66, Greenlandic Inuit educator, women's right activist and politician.
- Lyle Ritz, 87, American bassist and ukulelist.
- Joe Rogers, 97, American businessman, co-founder of Waffle House.
- Stephen Ross, 73, American economist.
- Aquinas Ryan, 84, Canadian politician, leader of the New Democratic Party of Prince Edward Island (1972–1979).
- Danny Spooner, 80, English folk singer.
- Anthony Steels, 57, American football player (San Diego Chargers, Buffalo Bills).
- Anne Kristin Sydnes, 60, Norwegian politician, Minister of International Development (2000–2001), cancer.
- Gordon Thomas, 84, Welsh investigative journalist and author.
- Thor Tjøntveit, 80, Norwegian aviator.

=== 4 ===
- Jean-Christophe Averty, 88, French television and radio director.
- Roy Blake Sr., 88, American politician.
- Bonnie Burnard, 72, Canadian novelist (A Good House).
- Valerie Carter, 64, American singer-songwriter (Howdy Moon, Just a Stone's Throw Away), heart attack.
- Mahlon E. Doyle, 92, American cryptologist.
- Edi Fitzroy, 62, Jamaican reggae singer.
- Roger Hau'ofa, 73, Tongan-born Papua New Guinean radio broadcaster, kidney failure.
- Doug Hogland, 85, American football player (San Francisco 49ers, Chicago Cardinals, Detroit Lions).
- John Holliman, 72, British Anglican priest, Archdeacon of the Army (1996-1999).
- Lawrence Holofcener, 91, American-British sculptor.
- Irena Homola-Skąpska, 88, Polish historian.
- Stefan Ingvarsson, 70, Swedish Olympic racewalker.
- Takashi Inoue, 56, Japanese actor, cancer.
- Eugene N. Kozloff, 96, American marine biologist and botanist.
- Péter Kozma, 57, Hungarian politician and MP.
- Bob Lee, 81, American football player (Boston Patriots).
- Helen M. Marshall, 87, American politician, Borough President of Queens (2002–2013), member of the New York State Assembly (1983–1991).
- Giovanni Palamara, 78, Italian politician, Mayor of Reggio Calabria (1984–1985).
- Thomas Collier Platt Jr., 91, American jurist, U.S. District Court for the Eastern District of New York (since 1974).
- Edna Rose Ritchings, 92, Canadian-American religious leader (International Peace Mission movement).
- Margaret Roberts, 79–80, South African herbalist.
- Syed Shahabuddin, 82, Indian diplomat and politician, MP (1979–1996).
- Thomas Starzl, 90, American physician and medical researcher.
- Lazar Stojanović, 73, Serbian film director and activist.
- Ron Van Ryswyk, 86, American football coach.
- Alberto Villalta, 69, Salvadoran Olympic footballer (1968).
- Clayton Yeutter, 86, American politician, Trade Representative (1985–1989) and Secretary of Agriculture (1989–1991), colorectal cancer.

=== 5 ===
- Sydney Ball, 83, Australian painter.
- Anthony Beilenson, 84, American politician, member of the U.S. House of Representatives from California's 23rd and 24th congressional districts (1977–1997), heart attack.
- Fiora Contino, 91, American opera conductor.
- Gérard Corboud, 91, Swiss art collector and philanthropist.
- George Davidson, 91, American basketball player and coach.
- Burke Day, 62, American politician, member of Georgia House of Representatives (1995–2011).
- Joseph Charles Doumba, 81, Cameroonian politician.
- Antal Hajba, 79, Hungarian Olympic sprint canoeist (1964).
- Gladys Hansen, 91, American librarian, archivist and author.
- Ivar J. Hauge, 80, Norwegian politician.
- Douglas Henry, 90, American politician, Tennessee State Senator (1971–2014).
- Dave Hunt, 74, American comic book artist (Legion of Super-Heroes, Supergirl, Transformers), cancer.
- Florence S. Jacobsen, 103, American Mormon leader and missionary.
- Octave Levenspiel, 90, American chemical engineer.
- Jay Lynch, 72, American underground comics artist, writer and editor (Bijou Funnies, Bazooka Joe), complications from lung cancer.
- Leonard Manasseh, 100, British architect.
- Kurt Moll, 78, German opera singer.
- Theodor Anton Neagu, 84, Romanian paleontologist.
- Raymond Paternoster, 65, American criminologist.
- Bob Tucker, 73, American football coach (Wooster Fighting Scots).
- Vince, 4, Dutch-born rhinoceros, shot.
- Fred Weintraub, 88, American club owner (The Bitter End) and film producer (Enter the Dragon).
- Zhuang Yan, 99, Chinese diplomat, Ambassador to Bangladesh (1976–1979), Iran (1980–1982), and Greece (1983–1985).

=== 6 ===
- Ritchie Adams, 78, American songwriter ("Tossin' and Turnin'", "The Tra La La Song (One Banana, Two Banana)", "After the Lovin'") and singer.
- Bassel al-Araj, 31, Palestinian activist and pharmacist, shot.
- Joachim Baxla, 62, Indian politician, MP (1996–2009), cancer.
- David Campagna, 70, American actor and stunt double.
- Maneck Dalal, 98, Indian executive (Air India).
- Rudolf Deng Majak, 76, South Sudanese Roman Catholic prelate, Bishop of Wau (since 1995).
- Lars Diedricson, 55, Swedish singer (Snowstorm), songwriter ("Take Me to Your Heaven") and winner of the Eurovision Song Contest 1999.
- Jesús Silva-Herzog Flores, 81, Mexican economist and politician.
- Clyde Foster, 85, American scientist and mathematician.
- Bill Hougland, 86, American basketball player (Phillips 66ers) and Olympic champion (1952, 1956).
- T. William Lambe, 96, American civil engineer.
- Mickey Marvin, 61, American football player (Oakland Raiders), amyotrophic lateral sclerosis.
- Jehoash Mayanja Nkangi, 85, Ugandan politician, Katikkiro of Buganda (1964–1966, 1993–1994), Minister of Education (1986–1989), Finance (1989–1998) and Justice (1998–2002).
- James Michael Moynihan, 84, American Roman Catholic prelate, Bishop of Syracuse (1995–2009).
- Robert Osborne, 84, American film historian and television host (Turner Classic Movies).
- Marek Ostrowski, 57, Polish footballer (Pogoń Szczecin).
- Eddy Pauwels, 81, Belgian racing cyclist.
- Carleton Perry, 85, American politician.
- Bernt Petersen, 80, Danish furniture designer.
- Rabi Ray, 90, Indian politician, Speaker of the Lok Sabha (1989–1991).
- Shirley Childress Saxton, 69, American sign language interpreter, complications from West Nile virus.
- Dudley Storey, 77, New Zealand rower, Olympic champion (1968) and silver medalist (1972).
- Geoffrey Wainwright, 79, British archaeologist.
- Alberto Zedda, 89, Italian conductor and musicologist.

=== 7 ===
- Yoshiyuki Arai, 82, Japanese politician, lung cancer.
- Kamran Aziz, 85, Turkish Cypriot pianist, composer and pharmacist, pulmonary complications.
- Ron Bass, 68, American professional wrestler (CWA, CWF, WWF), complications from surgery.
- Klaus Bechgaard, 72, Danish chemist.
- Kalika Prasad Bhattacharya, 47, Indian folk singer, traffic collision.
- Slavko Brezoski, 94, Macedonian architect.
- Gina Calleja, 88, British-born Canadian author.
- Edmond La Beaume Cherbonnier, 99, American theologian.
- Henning Kramer Dahl, 54, Norwegian poet, translator, essayist and recording artist.
- Hans Georg Dehmelt, 94, German-born American physicist, laureate of the Nobel Prize in Physics (1989).
- Ronald Drever, 85, Scottish physicist.
- Peter M. Gruber, 75, Austrian mathematician.
- Julian Haines, 73, English bowler.
- Yukinori Miyabe, 48, Japanese speed skater, Olympic bronze medalist (1992), cancer.
- Tadeusz Rybak, 87, Polish Roman Catholic prelate, Bishop of Legnica (1992–2005).
- Robert A. Sengstacke, 73, American photojournalist.
- Syed Sajjad Ali Shah, 84, Pakistani jurist, Chief Justice (1994–1997).
- Helen Sommers, 84, American politician, member of the Washington House of Representatives (1972–2009).
- Lynne Stewart, 77, American defense attorney and convicted criminal, complications from breast cancer and multiple strokes.
- Francis Thorne, 94, American composer.
- Juan Carlos Touriño, 72, Spanish footballer (Real Madrid).
- Ellery Williams, 90, American football player (New York Giants).
- Xu Zuyao, 95, Chinese materials science expert.

=== 8 ===
- Robert Adeyinka Adebayo, 88, Nigerian politician and military officer.
- Ezzrett Anderson, 97, American football player (Calgary Stampeders).
- Óscar Asiáin, 68, Mexican Olympic basketball player.
- Gerard Benderoth, 48, American strongman and police officer, suicide by gunshot.
- Sir Clive Bossom, 99, British politician, MP for Leominster (1959–1974).
- Lou Duva, 94, American boxing trainer and manager.
- Kim Bong-jo, 71, South Korean Olympic swimmer (1964).
- Yuri Koroviansky, 49, Ukrainian Olympic volleyball player (1992).
- Lee Yuan-tsu, 93, Taiwanese politician, Vice President (1990–1996).
- Michael Maher, 87, Irish hurler (Tipperary).
- Danilo Mainardi, 83, Italian ethologist and author.
- Dmitry Mezhevich, 76, Russian actor and songwriter.
- Margaret Mitchell, 92, Canadian politician and social activist.
- Jonathan Moore, 84, American academic and State Department official, Director of the Bureau of Refugee Programs (1987–1989).
- Jonathan Moore, 47, American rapper, kidney failure.
- Joseph Nicolosi, 70, American clinical psychologist, influenza complications.
- George Andrew Olah, 89, Hungarian-born American chemist, Nobel Prize laureate (1994).
- Jack Purtell, 95, Australian jockey.
- Donald V. Rattan, 92, American major general.
- Jonathan Strasser, 70, American violinist and conductor (Fame).
- Dave Valentin, 64, American jazz flautist, Parkinson's disease.

=== 9 ===
- Mick Adams, 65, English rugby league player (Widnes Vikings).
- Kasugafuji Akihiro, 51, Japanese sumo wrestler.
- Ann Beach, 78, British actress (Fresh Fields, Notting Hill).
- Bobby Byrne, 85, American cinematographer (Smokey and the Bandit, Bull Durham, Mad About You).
- Anthony Delhalle, 35, French motorcycle racer, fall during test ride.
- Jane Freeman, 81, Welsh actress (Last of the Summer Wine), lung cancer.
- Susan Gould, 87, American chemist and politician.
- Bill Hands, 76, American baseball player (Chicago Cubs).
- Barbara Helsingius, 79, Finnish singer, poet and Olympic fencer (1960).
- Sir Howard Hodgkin, 84, British painter and printmaker.
- Keith Holliday, 82, British rugby league player (Wakefield Trinity).
- Marian Jankowski, 85, Polish Olympic weightlifter.
- Peter Karoff, 79, American philanthropist.
- Hla Myint, 97, Burmese economist.
- Grethe Lovsø Nielsen, 90, Danish Olympic athlete (1948).
- Samuel Ogbemudia, 84, Nigerian politician, Governor of Mid-Western State (1967–1975).
- Aldo Quaglio, 85, French rugby union player.
- Neila Sathyalingam, 78, Sri Lankan-born Singaporean dancer and choreographer.
- Jacqueline Naze Tjøtta, 81, Norwegian mathematician.

=== 10 ===
- Bob Altman, 85, American comedian, leukemia.
- Buddy Baarcke, 85, American swimmer.
- Dave Brazil, 80, American football coach (New York Giants).
- Absalón Castellanos Domínguez, 93, Mexican politician, Governor of Chiapas (1982–1988).
- Sir Nigel Cecil, 91, British Royal Navy officer, Lieutenant Governor of the Isle of Man (1980–1985).
- Mari Evans, 93, American poet.
- Carol Field, 76, American cookbook author, complications from a stroke.
- John Forgeham, 75, British actor (The Italian Job, Sheena, Footballers' Wives), complications from a fall.
- Christopher Gray, 66, American journalist and architectural historian.
- Tony Haygarth, 72, English actor (Chicken Run, Emmerdale, Dracula), Alzheimer's disease.
- Glyn Tegai Hughes, 94, Welsh academic and politician.
- Ben Jobe, 84, American college basketball coach (Southern, South Carolina State, Alabama A&M).
- Charles Wycliffe Joiner, 101, American jurist, member of the District Court for the Eastern District of Michigan (since 1972).
- Gido Kokars, 95, Latvian conductor.
- Kafougouna Koné, 73, Malian politician.
- Bill Leak, 61, Australian editorial cartoonist, heart attack.
- Alain Levoyer, 76, French politician.
- Yngve Lundh, 92, Swedish Olympic racing cyclist (1952).
- Maurice Lusien, 90, French Olympic swimmer (1948, 1952).
- Alu Mendonca, 84, Kenyan Olympic hockey player.
- Roy Mason, 83, British figure skater, European championship bronze medalist (1960).
- Nikolay Minev, 85, Bulgarian chess player.
- John Minson, 89, Australian radio personality.
- Jerry Rehm, 90, American politician.
- Aníbal Ruiz, 74, Uruguayan football manager (Paraguay), heart attack.
- Joni Sledge, 60, American singer (Sister Sledge).
- John Surtees, 83, British motorcycle racer, world champion (1956, 1958, 1959, 1960) and Formula One driver, world champion (1964), respiratory failure.
- Anna Tramontano, 59, Italian computational biologist.
- Richard Wagamese, 61, Canadian author (Medicine Walk).
- Robert James Waller, 77, American writer (The Bridges of Madison County), multiple myeloma.

=== 11 ===
- Tommy Asher, 80, English footballer (Notts County F.C.).
- Lloyd Conover, 93, American scientist, inventor of tetracycline, heart failure.
- Kitty Courbois, 79, Dutch actress (Leedvermaak), brain haemorrhage.
- Penelope Reed Doob, 73, American academic, Parkinson's disease.
- Jean-Claude Étienne, 75, French politician.
- Garrett G. Fagan, 54, Irish-born American historian, pancreatic cancer.
- Evan Johns, 60, American guitarist (The LeRoi Brothers), complications from surgery.
- András Kovács, 91, Hungarian filmmaker.
- Paul Mitchell, 96, American football player (Los Angeles Dons).
- Ángel Parra, 73, Chilean singer and songwriter, lung cancer.
- Winifred Piesse, 93, Australian politician.
- Mohamed Mijarul Quayes, 56, Bangladeshi diplomat, Ambassador to the United Kingdom (2012–2014) and Brazil (since 2014), multiple organ failure.
- Cheyyar Ravi, 54, Indian film and television director, cardiac arrest.
- Tsui Hsiao-ping, 94, Taiwanese radio director.
- Don Warden, 87, American country musician and manager (Dolly Parton).
- Manfred Weiß, 72, German politician, Justice Minister of Bavaria (1999–2003).

=== 12 ===
- Pamela Sue Anderson, 61, British philosopher, cancer.
- Murray Ball, 78, New Zealand cartoonist (Footrot Flats).
- Luigi Barbarito, 94, Italian Roman Catholic prelate, Apostolic Nuncio (1969–1997).
- James Brink, 91, American tennis player.
- Anatoly Chernyaev, 95, Russian historian and writer.
- Horst Ehmke, 90, German politician, Minister of Justice (1969).
- Christian Feurstein, 58, Austrian abbot.
- Jacques Fihey, 85, French Roman Catholic prelate, Bishop of Coutances and Avranches (1989–2006).
- Ray Hassall, 74, English politician, Lord Mayor of Birmingham (2015–2016).
- Joseph Hilbe, 72, American statistician and philosopher.
- Sir Probyn Inniss, 80, Saint Kitts and Nevis lawyer, Governor of Saint Christopher and Nevis (1975–1981).
- Stavro Jabra, 70, Lebanese cartoonist.
- Sverre Bergh Johansen, 77, Norwegian diplomat, Ambassador to China (1994–1999).
- Petra Kandarr, 66, German sprinter, European champion (1969).
- Sture Korpi, 77, Swedish politician, Secretary of state (1982–1991).
- Patrick Nève, 67, Belgian racing driver (Formula One).
- Joann Osterud, 71, American stunt pilot.
- Bhuma Nagi Reddy, 53, Indian politician, heart attack.
- Harvey Smith, 80, Canadian politician, Winnipeg City Council (1980–1986, 1998–2014), Manitoba Legislative Assembly (1986–1988).
- Dave Taylor, 76, English footballer (Yeovil Town).

=== 13 ===
- John Andariese, 78, American broadcaster (New York Knicks).
- Adib Boroumand, 92, Iranian poet and politician, Head of Leadership Council of National Front of Iran (since 2000).
- Eamonn Casey, 89, Irish Roman Catholic prelate, Bishop of Galway and Kilmacduagh (1976–1992).
- John Crutcher, 100, American politician, Lieutenant Governor of Kansas (1965–1969).
- Henri Cueco, 88, French painter and author (Conversations with My Gardener).
- Danehill Dancer, 24, Irish-bred British-trained thoroughbred racehorse and sire, euthanized. (death announced on this date)
- Kika de la Garza, 89, American politician, member of the U.S. House of Representatives from Texas's 15th congressional district (1965–1997), kidney failure.
- Morton Deutsch, 97, American social psychologist.
- Diphan, 45, Indian film director, kidney problems.
- Vincent Foy, 101, Canadian Roman Catholic cleric and theologian.
- Osamu Fujimura, 89, Japanese phonetician.
- Chris Greetham, 80, British cricketer (Somerset).
- Morihiro Hashimoto, 40, Japanese darts player, brain haemorrhage.
- André Jagendorf, 90, American plant biologist.
- Sarah Jiménez, 90, Mexican artist.
- Maxx Kidd, 75, American music producer.
- Tommy LiPuma, 80, American music producer.
- Hiroto Muraoka, 85, Japanese footballer.
- Richard, 6th Prince of Sayn-Wittgenstein-Berleburg, 82, German royal, head of the House of Sayn-Wittgenstein-Berleburg.
- Amy Krouse Rosenthal, 51, American author, ovarian cancer.
- Richard H. Solomon, 79, American political aide and diplomat, Ambassador to the Philippines (1992–1993), brain cancer.
- Marvin Speight, 95, American basketball coach (Arkansas State).
- Dennis Stamp, 70, American professional wrestler (NWA, AWA), cancer.
- Vida Hajebi Tabrizi, 81, Iranian political activist and writer.
- Wildy Viana, 87, Brazilian politician and radiotelegrapher.
- Alejandro Végh Villegas, 88, Uruguayan politician and diplomat.
- Ed Whitlock, 86, British-born Canadian long distance runner, prostate cancer.

=== 14 ===
- Rebecca Bace, 61, American computer scientist, heart attack.
- Andrzej Biegalski, 64, Polish Olympic boxer (1976).
- Paul Bowles, 59, English footballer (Crewe Alexandra, Port Vale, Stockport County).
- Barbara Boxall, 84, English women's magazine editor.
- Lillie Mae Bradford, 88, American civil rights activist.
- Dara Fitzpatrick, 45, Irish Coast Guard helicopter pilot, helicopter crash.
- Thomas H. Friedkin, 81, American businessman (Gulf States Toyota).
- Donald Gilchrist, 95, Canadian figure skater.
- Jack H. Harris, 98, American film producer (The Blob).
- Arleene Johnson, 93, Canadian baseball player (AAGPBL).
- Nitin Kapoor, 58, Indian film producer, suicide by jumping.
- Luigi Mannelli, 78, Italian water polo player, Olympic champion (1960).
- Jim McAnearney, 81, Scottish football player (Plymouth Argyle) and manager (Rotherham United).
- Jean-Pierre Montminy, 83, Canadian military bandmaster and clarinetist.
- Yelena Naimushina, 52, Russian gymnast, Olympic champion (1980).
- Luigi Pascale, 93, Italian aircraft designer (Partenavia P.68).
- Royal Robbins, 82, American rock climber.
- Nan Ryan, 80, American author.
- André Tosel, 75, French Marxist philosopher.
- Rodrigo Valdéz, 70, Colombian boxer, WBC middleweight champion, heart attack.
- John Van de Kamp, 81, American politician and attorney, Los Angeles County District Attorney (1975–1981), California Attorney General (1983–1991).
- Peter Vargo, 75, Austrian footballer
- Tsunehiko Watase, 72, Japanese actor (The Incident).
- John Wheatcroft, 91, American writer and teacher.

=== 15 ===
- Antero de Abreu, 90, Angolan lawyer, writer and diplomat.
- Bảo Thăng, 72, Vietnamese royal, head of the Nguyễn dynasty (since 2007).
- Fritz Briel, 82, German sprint canoeist, world champion (1958, 1963), Olympic silver medalist (1956).
- Bob Bruce, 83, American baseball player (Detroit Tigers, Houston Astros, Atlanta Braves).
- Stephen Cosh, 97, Scottish cricketer.
- Imre Dimény, 94, Hungarian agrarian engineer and politician, Minister of Agriculture and Food (1967–1975).
- Robert G. Dunn, 94, American politician.
- Job Durupt, 86, French politician, member of the National Assembly (1981–1988), mayor of Tomblaine (1971–2001).
- Denis Éthier, 90, Canadian politician.
- Phil Garland, 75, New Zealand folk musician.
- Russ Goetz, 86, American baseball umpire (American League).
- Lucky Gordon, 85, Jamaican jazz singer, involved in the Profumo affair.
- Valentine Joseph, 88, Sri Lankan mathematician.
- Laurent Laplante, 83, Canadian journalist, pancreatic cancer.
- Alberto Longarella, 93, Argentine Olympic wrestler (1948, 1952).
- King Lysen, 75, American politician.
- Fernand Martinaux, 88, French Olympic swimmer.
- Michael Maule, 95, South African-born American ballet dancer and instructor.
- Wojciech Młynarski, 75, Polish poet, singer and songwriter.
- Enrique Morea, 92, Argentine tennis player, French Open (1950) and Pan Am Games (1951) champion.
- Jackie Pung, 95, American golfer.
- Sok An, 66, Cambodian politician, Deputy Prime Minister (since 2004) and MP (since 1993).
- Dave Stallworth, 75, American basketball player (New York Knicks, Baltimore/Capital Bullets).
- Bill Walsh, 55, American author and newspaper editor (The Washington Post), complications from bile duct cancer.
- Chris Williams, 36, American basketball player (Virginia Cavaliers, Sydney Kings), blood clots.

=== 16 ===
- Tony Barrow, 45, English rugby league player (Swinton Lions), cancer.
- Hans Brattrud, 83, Norwegian furniture designer.
- George Braziller, 101, American literary publisher.
- James Cotton, 81, American blues harmonica player ("Hard Again"), pneumonia.
- K. R. Indira Devi, 65, Indian actress, cardiac arrest.
- Aleksander Einseln, 85, Estonian military officer, Commander of the Estonian Defence Forces (1993–1995).
- James A. Frost, 98, British-born American historian.
- Kerry Hooper, 74, Australian cricketer.
- Arne Høivik, 85, Norwegian footballer (Eik-Tønsberg).
- Carole Jo Kabler, 78, American professional golfer.
- Roberta Knie, 79, American operatic soprano.
- Torgny Lindgren, 78, Swedish writer, member of the Swedish Academy (since 1991).
- Rodger Maus, 84, American art director (M*A*S*H, Victor/Victoria, The Time Tunnel).
- Hasyim Muzadi, 72, Indonesian Islamic scholar and cleric, Chairman of Nahdlatul Ulama (1999–2010).
- Henry Richmond, 81, British Anglican prelate, Bishop of Repton (1986–1998).
- Lewis Rowland, 91, American neurologist, stroke.
- William Sanders, 74, American statistician.
- Youcef Touati, 27, French-born Algerian football player (Red Star), traffic collision.
- Philippa Wiggins, 91, New Zealand academic.
- Skip Williamson, 72, American underground comix cartoonist (Snappy Sammy Smoot), complications from organ failure.

=== 17 ===
- Robert Day, 94, British television and film director (The Green Man, First Man into Space, The Rebel).
- Auntie Fee, 59, American Internet personality and actress (Barbershop: The Next Cut), heart attack.
- Roland Fidel, 82, Swiss Olympic weightlifter.
- José Luis Garzón, 70, Spanish Olympic footballer (1968).
- Hugh Hardy, 84, American architect.
- Maureen Haughey, 91, Irish public figure.
- John Herbers, 93, American journalist and author.
- Peter Kwong, 76, Taiwanese-American sociologist.
- Léonard Legault, 82, Canadian diplomat, Ambassador to the Holy See (1993–1997).
- George Lewith, 67, British medical researcher.
- Lawrence Montaigne, 86, American actor (The Great Escape, Star Trek, Escape to Witch Mountain).
- Jackie Paisley, 54, American bodybuilder.
- Norbert Sander, 74, American long-distance runner, winner of the New York City Marathon (1974).
- Crispian Scully, 71, British dental academic.
- John W. Shannon, 83, American colonel and politician.
- Joe Sherman, 90, American songwriter.
- Paul Sicula, 78, American politician.
- Laurynas Stankevičius, 81, Lithuanian politician, Prime Minister (1996).
- Jan Szpunar, 64, Polish Olympic biathlete.
- Inomjon Usmonxoʻjayev, 86, Soviet politician, First Secretary of the Communist Party of Uzbekistan (1983–1988).
- Sir Derek Walcott, 87, Saint Lucian poet and playwright, Nobel Prize laureate (1992).

=== 18 ===
- Tom Amberry, 94, American podiatrist.
- Chuck Berry, 90, American Hall of Fame guitarist, singer and songwriter ("Johnny B. Goode", "Maybellene", "Roll Over Beethoven"), heart attack.
- George E. Bria, 101, Italian-born American journalist (Associated Press).
- Trisha Brown, 80, American choreographer and dancer.
- Eugene Crum Foshee, 79, American politician.
- Sergei Gimayev, 62, Russian ice hockey player (CSKA Moscow) and television sports presenter.
- Gerry Gimelstob, 66, American basketball coach (George Washington Colonials), leukemia.
- Don Hunstein, 88, American photographer.
- Maureen Lines, 79, British-born Pakistani social worker and environmentalist.
- Joe Mafela, 75, South African actor (Zulu, Shout at the Devil, Escape from Angola), traffic collision.
- J. Donald Monan, 92, American academic administrator, President of Boston College (1972–1996).
- Tony Russel, 91, American actor (Behind the Mask of Zorro, Wild, Wild Planet, War of the Planets).
- Johnny Shannon, 84, English actor (Performance, Beryl's Lot, EastEnders).
- Ashwin Sundar, 31, Indian racing driver, car fire.
- Alfred Tibor, 97, Hungarian-born American sculptor and Holocaust survivor.
- Miloslav Vlk, 84, Czech Roman Catholic cardinal, Archbishop of Prague (1991–2010), cancer.
- Bernie Wrightson, 68, American illustrator and comic book artist (House of Mystery, Batman, Swamp Thing), brain cancer.

=== 19 ===
- Zubaida Gulshan Ara, 74, Bangladeshi writer, recipient of the Ekushey Padak (1995).
- Jimmy Breslin, 88, American journalist and author (New York Daily News, Newsday), recipient of the Pulitzer Prize (1986), complications from pneumonia.
- Mary Maples Dunn, 85, American historian.
- Ivan Grubišić, 80, Croatian Roman Catholic priest, sociologist, and MP (2011–2015).
- Billy Hails, 82, English football player and manager (Peterborough United).
- Audrey Kissel, 91, American baseball player (Minneapolis Millerettes).
- Li Li-hua, 92, Hong Kong actress.
- Ryan McBride, 27, Irish footballer (Derry City).
- John Jeremiah McRaith, 82, American Roman Catholic prelate, Bishop of Owensboro (1982–2009).
- Len Mitzel, 71, Canadian politician, MLA (2004–2012).
- Chinu Modi, 78, Indian poet, multiple organ failure.
- Pyarimohan Mohapatra, 77, Indian politician, MP (2010–2016).
- Tomiko Okazaki, 73, Japanese politician.
- Roger Pingeon, 76, French racing cyclist, Tour de France winner (1967), heart attack.
- John Rogan, 78, Irish actor (The Bill).
- Eric Shanes, 72, English painter and art historian.
- Robin Sibson, 72, British mathematician, vice-chancellor of the University of Kent, chief executive of the Higher Education Statistics Agency.
- Pauline Smith, 83, British painter and provocateur.
- Ian Stewart, 87, British racing driver.
- Ken Still, 82, American professional golfer.
- Maurice Xiberras, 80, Gibraltarian politician.

=== 20 ===
- Herbert Barrie, 89, British paediatrician.
- Bagrat de Bagration y de Baviera, 68, Spanish royal, member of the Bagrationi dynasty.
- Daniel G. Bobrow, 81, American computer scientist.
- John Paul Cain, 81, American golfer.
- Andy Coan, 59, American swimmer, liver cancer.
- Terence Finlay, 79, Canadian Anglican prelate, Metropolitan of Ontario and Archbishop of Toronto (2000–2004).
- Louis Frémaux, 95, French conductor.
- John Giheno, 68, Papua New Guinea politician.
- Lucio Grotone, 88, Brazilian Olympic boxer.
- Carlos Hermosillo Arteaga, 39, Mexican politician (PRI), Deputy (2015-2018), and public servant, traffic collision.
- Shuntaro Hida, 100, Japanese physician, complications from pneumonia.
- Buck Hill, 90, American jazz saxophonist.
- Joyce Holmberg, 86, American politician and educator.
- Betty Kennedy, 91, Canadian broadcaster (CFRB), Senator (2000–2001) and TV panelist (Front Page Challenge).
- David Lawrence, 58, American basketball player (McNeese State, Pallacanestro Trieste, Saski Baskonia).
- Edward Joseph McManus, 97, American politician and jurist, Lieutenant Governor of Iowa (1959–1961), member of the District Court for N.D. Iowa (since 1962), longest-serving federal judge.
- Sol Negrin, 88, American cinematographer (Kojak).
- Leticia Ramos-Shahani, 87, Filipino politician, member of the Senate (1987–1998) and President pro tempore (1993–1996), complications from colon cancer and pneumonia.
- Poddutoori Ganga Reddy, 83, Indian politician, MP (1967–1970, 1971–1977).
- Chandler Robbins, 98, American ornithologist.
- David Rockefeller, 101, American banker (Chase Manhattan), globalist (Trilateral Commission) and philanthropist (Rockefeller Brothers Fund), heart failure.
- Robert B. Silvers, 87, American editor (New York Review of Books).
- Edgar Smith, 83, American murderer.
- Tony Terran, 90, American trumpeter and session musician.
- George Weinberg, 87, American psychologist, coined the term "homophobia", cancer.
- Ed Wright, 67, American Olympic fencer.

=== 21 ===
- Chuck Barris, 87, American television producer, game show creator, host (The Gong Show, The Dating Game), and songwriter ("Palisades Park").
- Guy Bisaillon, 77, Canadian politician.
- Colin Dexter, 86, English author (Inspector Morse).
- Henri Emmanuelli, 71, French politician, President of National Assembly (1993–1994), complications from acute bronchitis.
- August Englas, 92, Estonian wrestler, world champion (1953, 1954).
- Roy Fisher, 86, British poet and jazz pianist.
- Arne Herjuaune, 71, Norwegian Olympic speed skater (1968).
- Larry Highbaugh, 67, Canadian football player (Edmonton Eskimos).
- Kalevi Häkkinen, 89, Finnish Olympic alpine skier and speed skier (1956).
- Jerry Krause, 77, American basketball executive (Chicago Bulls).
- Marita Lindahl, 78, Finnish model, Miss World (1957).
- Scott McGilvray, 51, American politician, New Hampshire Senator (since 2016).
- Martin McGuinness, 66, Northern Irish PIRA commander and politician, deputy First Minister (2007–2017), MLA (1998–2017), MP (1997–2013), complications from amyloidosis.
- Ronald Pickvance, 86, English art historian.
- Bill Rompkey, 80, Canadian politician, Senator from Newfoundland and Labrador (1995–2011).
- Alfredo Reichlin, 91, Italian politician and journalist (l'Unità), deputy (1968–1994), MEP (1984–1985).
- Wallace Shoemaker, 85, American politician.
- József Szécsényi, 85, Hungarian Olympic discus thrower (1960, 1964).
- Tayfun Talipoğlu, 54, Turkish journalist and author, heart attack.
- Govind Talwalkar, 92, Indian journalist and editor (Maharashtra Times).
- Teresia Teaiwa, 48, I-Kiribati-American poet and academic, cancer.
- José Zardón, 93, Cuban baseball player (Washington Senators).

=== 22 ===
- Marilyn McCord Adams, 73, American philosopher and priest, cancer.
- Andy Coogan, 99, Scottish author and World War II veteran.
- Ken Currie, 91, Scottish footballer (Heart of Midlothian, Dunfermline Athletic).
- John Derrick, 54, Welsh cricketer (Glamorgan), brain tumour.
- Dallas Green, 82, American baseball player, manager (Philadelphia Phillies, New York Mets) and executive (Chicago Cubs), kidney failure and pneumonia.
- Pete Hamilton, 74, American racecar driver, winner of the 1970 Daytona 500.
- Sib Hashian, 67, American drummer (Boston).
- Mark Higgins, 53, American baseball player (Cleveland Indians).
- Francine Hughes, 69, American film subject (The Burning Bed) and domestic abuse symbol, complications from pneumonia.
- Alexandr Kliment, 88, Czech writer, poet and playwright, Charter 77 signatory.
- Joanne Kyger, 82, American poet, lung cancer.
- Sven-Erik Magnusson, 74, Swedish musician (Sven-Ingvars), prostate cancer.
- Tomas Milian, 84, Cuban-born Italian actor (The Big Gundown, Traffic, Amistad), stroke.
- Agustí Montal Costa, 82, Spanish economist and businessman, President of FC Barcelona (1969–1977).
- Ronnie Moran, 83, English football player and coach (Liverpool).
- Piroska Oszoli, 98, Hungarian painter.
- Keith Palmer, 48, British police officer, stabbed during 2017 Westminster attack.
- Daisuke Satō, 52, Japanese game designer, novelist, and manga writer (Highschool of the Dead), ischemic heart disease.
- Helena Štáchová, 72, Czech puppeteer (Spejbl and Hurvínek Theatre) and voice actress.
- Lembit Ulfsak, 69, Estonian actor (Tangerines), muscular dystrophy.
- Christina Vella, 75, American writer and historian.

=== 23 ===
- Lola Albright, 92, American actress (Champion, Peter Gunn, Lord Love a Duck).
- Ashokamitran, 85, Indian writer.
- Mirella Bentivoglio, 94, Italian artist.
- Miroslava Breach, 54, Mexican journalist (La Jornada), murdered.
- Ursula Brunner, 92, Swiss politician and advocate of fair trade in Switzerland.
- Donald Burgett, 91, American writer and World War II veteran.
- John W. Darrah, 78, American jurist, member of the District Court for the Northern District of Illinois (since 2000).
- Serge Doubrovsky, 88, French author.
- Meir Einstein, 65, Israeli sports broadcaster (Channel 10), muscular dystrophy.
- Julio Etchegoyen, 83, Argentine army officer and politician, Governor of Chubut Province (1976–1978) and La Pampa Province (1978–1981).
- Lee Farr, 89, American actor (Thundering Jets, Lone Texan, Gunfighters of Abilene).
- Nigel Hutchinson, 75, English-born New Zealand producer (Goodbye Pork Pie).
- Diana Ingro, 99, Argentine actress (By the Sweat of Your Brow, The Cicada Is Not an Insect, Extraña ternura).
- William H. Keeler, 86, American Roman Catholic cardinal, Bishop of Harrisburg (1983–1989), Archbishop of Baltimore (1989–2007).
- Arnfinn Lund, 81, Norwegian horse trainer.
- Clay Matthews Sr., 88, American football player (San Francisco 49ers).
- Denis McGrath, 48, American-Canadian television writer and producer (Continuum, XIII: The Series, Republic of Doyle), cancer.
- Nicolas Nieri, 77, Peruvian Olympic footballer (1960).
- Mary Owen, 96, Australian feminist and trade unionist.
- Ingeborg Rapoport, 104, German pediatrician.
- Ian Robinson, 91, Australian politician, member of the House of Representatives for Cowper (1963–1984) and Page (1984–1990).
- Sølvi Sogner, 85, Norwegian historian.
- Ahmad Taufik, 51, Indonesian journalist, lung cancer.
- Alex Tizon, 57, Filipino-born American journalist and author (The Seattle Times), recipient of the Pulitzer Prize (1997).
- Cino Tortorella, 89, Italian television presenter (Zecchino d'Oro).
- Denis Voronenkov, 45, Russian politician, member of the State Duma (2011–2016), shot.
- George Woodman, 85, American artist.

=== 24 ===
- Ivan Abadjiev, 85, Bulgarian weightlifter, world championship silver medalist (1957).
- J. Allen Adams, 85, American politician and legislator.
- Herbert Addo, 66, Ghanaian football coach.
- Bartolo Alvarez, 102, Puerto Rican musician.
- Derrick Baxby, 76, British microbiologist.
- Roger Bradley, 54, New Zealand-Dutch cricketer.
- Piers Dixon, 88, British politician, MP for Truro (1970–1974).
- John Doull, 94, American toxicologist.
- Rich Fisher, 67, American news anchor (WJBK), esophageal cancer.
- Lennox Grafton, 97, Canadian architect.
- Hubert Hammerer, 92, Austrian sports shooter, Olympic gold medalist (1960).
- Leo Peelen, 48, Dutch track cyclist, Olympic silver medalist (1988).
- Jean Rouverol, 100, American actress (It's a Gift) and screenwriter (Autumn Leaves, The Guiding Light).
- Pedro Salvatori, 83, Argentine politician, Governor of Neuquén Province (1973, 1987–1991).
- Avraham Sharir, 84, Israeli diplomat and politician, Minister of Tourism (1981–1988) and Justice (1986–1988).
- Pete Shotton, 75, British washboardist (The Quarrymen) and businessman (Fatty Arbuckle's, Apple Corps), suspected heart attack.
- William Kelly Simpson, 89, American Egyptologist.
- Wolfgang Solz, 77, German football player and coach (Eintracht Frankfurt, national team).
- Keith Sutton, 82, English Anglican prelate, Bishop of Lichfield (1984–2003).
- Mary Tortorich, 102, American voice teacher.
- Avo Uvezian, 91, Armenian-American jazz pianist and cigar manufacturer.
- Gilbert Vallanchon, 75, French Olympic rower.

=== 25 ===
- Abu Umar al-Almani, 30–31, German jihadist and ISIL commander, shot.
- Ralph Archbold, 75, American actor and impersonator (Benjamin Franklin), complications of heart failure.
- Sheila Bond, 90, American actress (Wish You Were Here, The Marrying Kind, Damn Yankees), Tony winner (1953).
- Giorgio Capitani, 89, Italian filmmaker (The Ruthless Four).
- Louis Desmarais, 94, Canadian politician.
- Gary Doak, 71, Canadian ice hockey player (Boston Bruins), cancer.
- Orlando Etcheberrigaray, 84, Chilean Olympic basketball player.
- Jack Faszholz, 89, American baseball player (St. Louis Cardinals).
- Louis Feldman, 90, American classical scholar.
- František Gaulieder, 66, Slovak politician, MP (1994–1996), suspected suicide by train.
- Daniel P. Gordon, 47, American politician, member of the Rhode Island House of Representatives (2011–2013).
- Paula Christine Hammond, 73, British magistrate.
- Asbjørn Hansen, 86, Norwegian footballer (Sparta, national team).
- Roberta L. Hazard, 82, American Navy rear admiral.
- J. Richard Hill, 88, British Navy rear admiral.
- Alice Hohlmayer, 92, American baseball player (Kenosha Comets).
- Walter Meier, 89, German Olympic athlete.
- Christy Mihos, 67, American businessman and politician, pancreatic cancer.
- Teodor Oizerman, 102, Ukrainian-born Russian philosopher, heart failure.
- Marcelo Pinto Carvalheira, 88, Brazilian Roman Catholic prelate, Bishop of Guarabira (1981–1989), Archbishop of Paraíba (1995–2004).
- Charles D. Ravenel, 79, American politician.
- Miquel Roger i Casamada, 62, Spanish composer and music producer, traffic collision.
- Sir Cuthbert Sebastian, 95, St. Kitts and Nevis politician, Governor-General (1996–2013).
- Julian Stanczak, 88, Polish-born American Op Art painter.
- Dave Steele, 42, American racing driver (IndyCar, NASCAR, ARCA), USAC Silver Crown Champion (2004, 2005), race collision.
- María Esther Vázquez, 79, Argentine writer, stroke.
- N. K. Viswanathan, 75, Indian film director and cinematographer.
- Eric Watson, 91, New Zealand cricketer (Otago) and rugby union coach (Otago, national team).

=== 26 ===
- Alessandro Alessandroni, 92, Italian composer and musician.
- Audun Bakke, 83, Norwegian journalist.
- Darlene Cates, 69, American actress (What's Eating Gilbert Grape).
- Chen Uen, 58, Taiwanese manhua artist, heart attack.
- Mai Dantsig, 86, Belarusian artist.
- Monty Davidson, 81, Canadian politician.
- Jimmy Dotson, 83, American blues musician.
- Todd Frohwirth, 54, American baseball player (Baltimore Orioles, Philadelphia Phillies), stomach cancer.
- Joe Harris, 89, American illustrator and storyboard artist (Underdog, Trix).
- Ernest M. Henley, 92, American physicist.
- Marie Jakober, 75, Canadian author.
- Vladimir Kazachyonok, 64, Russian football player (Zenit) and manager (Dynamo Saint Petersburg).
- Leland McGaw, 89, Canadian politician.
- Brian Oldfield, 71, American Olympic shot putter (1972).
- Věra Špinarová, 65, Czech singer, heart attack.
- Philippe d'Ursel, 96, Swiss-born Belgian Olympic alpine skier (1948).
- Roger Wilkins, 85, American civil rights activist and journalist (The Crisis), Assistant Attorney General (1966–1969), complications from dementia.

=== 27 ===
- Leoncio Afonso, 100, Spanish scientist.
- Mizu Ahmed, 63, Bangladeshi actor, heart attack.
- Shirley Annan, 76, New Zealand netball player (national team).
- Peter Bastian, 73, Danish bassoonist.
- Richard Beale, 96, British actor (Doctor Who, Emmerdale, The Bill).
- Romolo Bizzotto, 92, Italian football player and manager (Verona, Juventus).
- Arthur Blythe, 76, American jazz alto saxophonist and composer, Parkinson's disease.
- Chelsea Brown, 74, American-Australian actress (Rowan & Martin's Laugh-In, Number 96), pneumonia.
- Porter Byrum, 96, American attorney and businessman.
- Jose Antonio Carrion, 68, Filipino politician, Governor of Marinduque (2007–2010, 1995–1998).
- Zaida Catalán, 36, Swedish lawyer and politician, Chairman of Young Greens of Sweden (2001–2005), shot. (body found on this date)
- Leone Cimpellin, 90, Italian cartoonist (Jonny Logan).
- Stanley Cohen, 90, American physicist.
- Tom Cosgrove, 86, American football player.
- Clem Curtis, 76, Trinidadian-born British singer, lung cancer.
- Beau Dick, 61, Canadian Kwakwaka'wakw activist and carver, complications from a stroke.
- Kaljo Ellik, 68, Estonian politician.
- Jean-Michel Guilcher, 102, French ethnologist.
- Cherry, Lady Hambro, 83, British journalist and aviator.
- John D. Herbert, 86, American attorney, Ohio State Treasurer (1963–1971).
- Velik Kapsazov, 81, Bulgarian gymnast, Olympic bronze medalist (1960).
- Rainer Kussmaul, 70, German violinist, conductor and concertmaster, Grammy Award winner (2005).
- Eduard Mudrik, 77, Ukrainian-born Russian football player (Dynamo Moscow).
- Charles Murphy, 56, American investor and hedge fund manager.
- Ali H. Nayfeh, 83, Palestinian-born American aerospace engineer.
- John A. Newton, 86, British Methodist minister.
- Armando Nieto, 85, Peruvian Roman Catholic priest and historian.
- Robert Parr, 95, American theoretical chemist.
- Sean Roberts, 48, New Zealand cricketer.
- Arun Sarma, 85, Indian playwright.
- David Storey, 83, English novelist (Saville), screenwriter (This Sporting Life) and playwright (Home), Parkinson's disease and dementia.
- Harold Neville Vazeille Temperley, 102, British applied mathematician.
- Steve Vaillancourt, 65, American politician, member of the New Hampshire House of Representatives (1996–2014, since 2016).
- Elizabeth Wagele, 77, American writer and musician, neuroendocrine cancer.

=== 28 ===
- Infanta Alicia, Duchess of Calabria, 99, Austro-Hungarian-born Spanish and Italian noblewoman.
- T. R. Andhyarujina, 83, Indian lawyer, Solicitor General (1996–1998).
- Jean-Pierre Cave, 65, French politician.
- Ronald Hines, 87, British actor (Not in Front of the Children).
- Deane R. Hinton, 94, American diplomat and ambassador.
- Brent Imlach, 70, Canadian ice hockey player (Toronto Maple Leafs).
- Ahmed Kathrada, 87, South African anti-apartheid activist and politician, MP (1994–1999), complications from cerebral embolism.
- Christine Kaufmann, 72, Austrian-born German actress (Town Without Pity, Bagdad Café, The Last Days of Pompeii), leukemia.
- Liévin Lerno, 89, Belgian bicycle racer, Olympic champion (1948), world championship silver medalist (1948).
- William McPherson, 84, American journalist (The Washington Post) and author, Pulitzer Prize winner (1977), complications from heart failure and pneumonia.
- Bill Minor, 94, American journalist.
- Gwilym Prys Prys-Davies, Baron Prys-Davies, 93, Welsh lawyer and politician.
- Gurdev Singh Badal, 85, Indian politician.
- Janine Sutto, 95, French-born Canadian actress (Kamouraska, Congorama, Route 132).
- Enn Vetemaa, 80, Estonian writer.

=== 29 ===
- Alexei Alexeyevich Abrikosov, 88, Russian-American theoretical physicist, laureate of the Nobel Prize in Physics (2003).
- Raudha Athif, 20, Maldivian model, suicide by hanging.
- Mireille Cébeillac-Gervasoni, 74, French historian.
- John Collias, 98, American Western artist.
- Wayne Duke, 88, American collegiate athletic executive, commissioner of the Big Ten Conference (1971–1988).
- Valeri Glushakov, 58, Kazakh-born Russian football player (Spartak Moscow, CSKA Moscow) and manager.
- Alan Johnston, 63, Irish cricketer.
- Steen Miles, 70, American journalist and politician, member of the Georgia State Senate (2005–2007), lung cancer.
- Battista Mismetti, 91, Italian Olympic cross-country skier.
- João Gilberto Noll, 70, Brazilian writer.
- Ernst Ogris, 49, Austrian football player (Hertha BSC) and manager.
- Linwood Sexton, 90, American football player (Wichita State Shockers, Los Angeles Dons).
- Katherine Smith, 98, American Navajo activist.
- Ken Sparks, 73, American football coach and player (Carson–Newman Eagles), prostate cancer.
- Bonno Spieker, 81, Dutch politician, member of the House of Representatives (1977–1981, 1981–1994).

=== 30 ===
- Thomas Brandis, 81, German violinist and concertmaster.
- Richard Bustillo, 75, American martial arts instructor.
- Caren Diefenderfer, 65, American mathematician, breast cancer.
- Sir John Fretwell, 86, British diplomat, Ambassador to France (1982–1987).
- James Hadnot, 59, American football player (Kansas City Chiefs), heart attack.
- Paul Hamilton, 75, Nigerian Olympic football player (1968) and manager (national team).
- Rosie Hamlin, 71, American singer (Rosie and the Originals).
- Donald Harvey, 64, American serial killer, beaten.
- Phillip Ko, 67, Hong Kong actor and director.
- Nina Lowry, 91, British barrister and judge.
- Robert Mahoney, 95, American politician, member of the Michigan House of Representatives (1955–1972).
- Alfred C. Marble Jr., 80, American Episcopal prelate, Bishop of Mississippi (1993–2003).
- Ralph R. Miller, 82, American politician.
- Neelamana Madhavan Nampoothiri, 73, Indian historian and writer.
- Hattie Peterson, 86, American baseball player (Rockford Peaches), lung cancer.
- Dick Potts, 77, British ecologist.
- Alec Ross, 80, Australian tour guide.
- Tom Savage, 76, Irish broadcasting executive, chairman of the RTÉ Board (2009–2014).
- Mary White, 91, English physician and chairwoman of the Bromsgrove Festival.

=== 31 ===
- Halit Akçatepe, 80, Turkish actor.
- Rubén Amaro Sr., 81, Mexican baseball player (Philadelphia Phillies, New York Yankees) and coach, World Series champion (1980).
- John Arnott, 84, English footballer (Bournemouth, Gillingham).
- Abul Kalam Azad, 45, Bangladeshi military officer, injuries sustained in bomb explosion.
- Gilbert Baker, 65, American artist and gay activist, creator of the rainbow flag.
- Richard Nelson Bolles, 90, American writer (What Color Is Your Parachute?).
- William Thaddeus Coleman Jr., 96, American lawyer (Brown v. Board of Education), federal judge and politician, Secretary of Transportation (1975–1977), Alzheimer's disease.
- Rupert Cornwell, 71, British journalist (The Independent).
- Miles Ferry, 84, American politician.
- Jerrier A. Haddad, 94, American computer engineer.
- Mike Hall, 35, British endurance cyclist, traffic collision.
- James Clinkscales Hill, 93, American jurist, member of the District Court for N.D. Georgia (1974–1976), 5th Cir. (1976–1981), and 11th Cir. (since 1981).
- Radley Metzger, 88, American pornographic filmmaker (I, a Woman, Camille 2000, The Lickerish Quartet).
- John Phillips, 65, Welsh footballer (Chelsea, national team).
- Amy Ridenour, 57, American conservative political activist, cancer.
- James Rosenquist, 83, American artist.
- Gordon H. Sato, 89, American cell biologist.
- Roland W. Schmitt, 93, American technology executive (General Electric) and academic administrator (Rensselaer Polytechnic Institute).
- Nigel Sitwell, 81, British conservationist and writer, Alzheimer's disease.
- Évelyne Sullerot, 92, French feminist.
