= Palamara =

Palamara is a surname. Notable people with this surname include:

- Giovanni Palamara (1938–2017), Italian politician, lawyer and member of the Italian Socialist Party (PSI)
- Joseph Palamara (born 1963), American politician, a former member of the Michigan House of Representatives
- Tank Palamara (born 1968), Italian rock guitarist
