= Manfred Weiss =

Manfred Weiss may refer to:

- Manfréd Weiss Steel and Metal Works, a machine factory in Hungary
- Manfred Weiss (composer) (born 1935), German composer
- Manfred Weiß, (1944–2017), a German politician
