= Van Rijswijk =

Van Rijswijk is a Dutch toponymic surname meaning "from/of Rijswijk". There are at least four places named Rijswijk in the Netherlands: towns in South Holland (in English formerly known as Ryswick), western Gelderland and North Brabant, and Castle Rijswijk in eastern Gelderland. Among variant spellings are Van Rijsewijk, Rijswijck, Riswijk, and Ryswyk. People with this name include:

- Denise van Rijswijk (born 1978), Dutch pop singer
- Jan Van Rijswijck (1853–1906), Belgian lawyer, liberal politician and journalist
- Johan van Rijswijck (c.1550–1612), Dutch fortress builder
- John van Rijswijck (born 1962), Luxembourg football goalkeeper
- René van Rijswijk (born 1971), Dutch football forward
- Ron Van Ryswyk (fl. 1960s), American football coach
- Saskia van Rijswijk (born 1960), Dutch Muay Thai champion and actress
- Theodoor van Rijswijck (1811–1849), Flemish writer
