= Levoyer =

Levoyer is a French surname. Notable people with the surname include:

- Alain Levoyer (1940–2017), French property lawyer and politician
- Richelieu Levoyer (1930–2015), Ecuadorian military officer and politician
