= Robert Altman (disambiguation) =

Robert Altman (1925–2006) was an American film director.

Robert Altman may also refer to:

- Robert Reed Altman (born 1959), American camera operator and director of photography
- Robert Altman (photographer) (1944–2021), American photographer
- Robert A. Altman (1947–2021), American businessman, chairman and CEO of ZeniMax Media
- Bob Altman (1931–2017), American comedian known as Uncle Dirty
