= Omollo =

Omollo is a surname. Notable people with the name include:

- Brian Ouko Omollo (born 1990), known professionally as Khaligraph Jones, Kenyan rapper
- Cyprian Ojwang Omollo (died 2017), Kenyan politician
- Sammy Omollo (born 1970), Kenyan footballer
