= Michael Mitchell =

Michael or Mike Mitchell may refer to:

== Arts and entertainment ==
- E. Michael Mitchell (1922–2009), Canadian painter and animation artist
- Mike Mitchell (actor) (born 1982), American actor, comedian, and writer
- Mike Mitchell (director) (born 1970), American film director
- Mike Mitchell (musician) (1959–2021), singer and guitarist with The Kingsmen
- Mike Mitchell (drummer) (born c. 1995), American drummer

== Sports ==
- Michael Mitchell (Australian rules footballer) (born 1961), Australian football player
- Mike Mitchell (baseball) (1879–1961), American baseball player
- Mike Mitchell (basketball, born 1956) (1956–2011), American basketball player in the NBA and Europe
- Mike Mitchell (basketball, born 1967), American basketball player in Australia and Europe
- Mike Mitchell (cornerback) (born 1961), American football cornerback
- Mike Mitchell (cricketer) (1843–1905), English cricketer
- Mike Mitchell (ice hockey) (1893–1942), Canadian ice hockey goaltender
- Mike Mitchell (safety) (born 1986), American football safety

== Others ==
- Mike Mitchell (Ohio politician), former Ohio Representative
- Mike Kanentakeron Mitchell, Canadian Mohawk politician, film director and lacrosse executive
- Michael C. Mitchell (born 1946), American planner, designer, lecturer and environmentalist
- Michael P. Mitchell (1925–2017), American politician in Idaho
- Michael Bowen Mitchell (1945–?), American senator and lawyer in Maryland
