= Mary White (physician) =

English physician

Frances Mary White, known as Mary, née Cottam, MBE (21 May 1925 – 30 March 2017) was an English general surgeon and chairwoman of the Bromsgrove Festival. She founded the Bromsgrove International Young Musicians Competition in 1980.

== Life ==
Frances Mary White was born Frances Cottam on 21 May 1925, in Whiston, South Yorkshire. She was the only child in a farming family, and after her father's death in 1927 was brought up by her mother and two aunts. White attended Leeds University, where she studied medicine, and met and married her husband there. She qualified in 1949, and went on to further study in obstetrics and gynecology. Later in life she specialised in surgery for the treatment of severe varicose veins. They moved to Bromsgrove for him to work as a general practitioner, and White was a surgeon in local hospitals.

White was interested in music, and became involved in the Bromsgrove Music Festival in 1960. She retired from medicine in 1980. She took over the chairmanship of the festival in 1980, in the midst of a funding crisis. She organised a new committee, new sponsors, and appointed a new artistic advisor, Donald Hunt, then head of music at Worcester Cathedral. White also founded The Bromsgrove International Young Musicians Competition that year. She was rewarded for her contributions to the festival with an MBE in 2005.

White was also a district officer with St John’s Ambulance Brigade, and served on the council of the British Medical Association for more than ten years. White was governor at North Bromsgrove High School.

White died on 30 March 2017, aged 91, and was survived by her two children.
