= Bartolo Alvarez =

- Born: November 9, 1914; Yauco, Puerto Rico
- Died: March 24, 2017 (aged 102); Fort Pierce, Florida
- Occupation: Musician

Bartolo Alvarez (November 9, 1914 – March 24, 2017) was a Puerto Rican musician and entrepreneur best known for establishing Casa Latina in East Harlem, New York in 1948. This record store still stands today, and was the first Spanish-language music shop opened in the United States. He was the father of five children.

== Biography ==
Inspired as a youngster by hearing Rafael Hernández Marín play at nearby Almacenes Hernández, Bartolo went on to found Alba and Rival Records, recording some of the era's most popular artists. Unlike the mega-music stores of today, Casa Latina and other neighborhoods music stores were gathering places for local and visiting musicians.

In 1948, musician and entrepreneur Bartolo Alvarez established Casa Latina, a music and instrument shop that becomes the primary destination for Latin music lovers. In 1962, the store moved to 151 E. 116th Street, where it continued its reign as the longest-running music store in East Harlem.

After another twenty years, he sold the business and retired with his family to Florida, dying there at the age of 102.

Hunter College, City University of New York's Center for Puerto Rican Studies recently dedicated a special section to Alvarez's work. The "Bartolo Alvarez Collection" consists of 0.12 cubic feet of correspondence, song title sheets, music notes, writings, newspaper articles, concert programs, photographs and music CDs of Alvarez's from the period between 1953 and 1971. It was donated by Ewin Martinez Torres.
