= Vida Hajebi Tabrizi =

Iranian political activist and writer

Vida Hadjebi
- ویدا حاجبی تبریزی
- Born: Vida Hajebi Tabrizi; 1936
- Died: 2017 (aged 80–81); Paris
- Occupations: writer, artist, activist
- Website: vidahadjebi.com

Vida Hajebi (Hadjebi) Tabrizi (1936–2017) was an Iranian social justice activist and writer.

== Activism ==
She was arrested in July 1972 in Tehran, and imprisoned for 6 years. In 1974 Columbia University sociologist Allan Silver personally took a letter of protest signed by the Canadian Association of Sociologists to Iranian Embassy in Washington, D.C. regarding her detention. American Feminist Kate Millett, the National Organization for Women representative and Anne Roberts, Amnesty International representative and other concerned U.S citizens publicly denounced the treatment of women prisoners of conscience in Iran.

== Works ==
She wrote several books. Her book "Daad va Bidaad" - in Persian - was about women in prisons in Iran.

== Awards and honors ==
She was a prisoner of conscience for seven years, and In 1978 she named as the "Prisoner of the Year " by Amnesty International.

== Death ==
She died in Paris at the age of 81.
