= Basil O'Rourke =

Australian rules footballer

Personal information
- Full name: Basil O'Rourke
- Born: 27 January 1930
- Died: 3 March 2017 (aged 87)
- Height: 173 cm (5 ft 8 in)
- Weight: 64 kg (141 lb)

Playing career^{1}
Years	Club	Games (Goals)
1951	Richmond	4 (0)
- ^{1} Playing statistics correct to the end of 1951.

Basil O'Rourke (27 January 1930 – 3 March 2017) was an Australian rules footballer who played for the Richmond Football Club in the Victorian Football League (VFL).
