= Eugene N. Kozloff =

American marine biologist and botanist

Eugene Nicolas Kozloff
- Born: 26 September 1920; Tehran, Iran
- Died: 4 March 2017 (aged 96); Anacortes, Washington, U.S.
- Known for: Author of Pacific Northwest field guides
- Scientific career
- Fields: Marine biology
- Workplaces: Friday Harbor Laboratories, University of Washington; Shannon Point Marine Center, Western Washington University

Eugene Nicolas Kozloff (26 September 1920 – 4 March 2017) was an American marine biologist and botanist at Shannon Point Marine Center on Fidalgo Island, Washington. He attended Riverside Junior College before obtaining both his Master's and Doctorate degree at the University of California. He taught biology and invertebrate zoology at the Lewis&Clark College, before eventually becoming an emeritus professor of the Friday Harbor Laboratories, University of Washington. He is best known for writing field guides for the Pacific Northwest Region of the United States and the several books he has written.

== Field guides ==
- Kozloff, E.N. 1973. Seashore life of Puget Sound, the Strait of Georgia, and the San Juan Archipelago. Seattle, Washington, University of Washington Press, 282 p.
- Kozloff, E.N. 1974. Keys to the marine invertebrates of Puget Sound, the San Juan Archipelago, and adjacent regions. Seattle, Washington, University of Washington Press, 226 p.
- Kozloff, E.N. 1976. Plants and animals of the Pacific Northwest: an illustrated guide to the natural history of western Oregon, Washington, and British Columbia. Seattle, Washington, University of Washington Press, 264 p.
- Kozloff, E.N. 1993. Seashore life of the Pacific Northwest: an illustrated guide to northern California, Oregon, Washington, and British Columbia. 370 p.
- Kozloff, E.N. 1996. Marine Invertebrates of the Pacific Northwest with additions and corrections. Seattle, Washington, University of Washington Press, 552 p.
- Beidleman, L.H. & E.N. Kozloff. 2003. Plants of the San Francisco Bay Region: Mendocino to Monterey. Berkeley, California, University of California Press. 514 p.
- Kozloff, E.N. 2005. Plants of western Oregon, Washington & British Columbia. Portland, Oregon, Timber Press. 608 p.

== Eponymous taxa ==
The following species have been named in honor of Dr. Kozloff.

- Acetabulastoma kozloffi Hart, 1971 - Ostracoda
- Collastoma kozloffi Westervelt, 1981 - Turbellaria
- Crebricoma kozloffi (Chatton & Lwoff, 1950) - Ciliophora
- Echinoderes kozloffi Higgins, 1977 - Kinorhyncha
- Genostoma kozloffi Hyra, 1993 - Turbellaria
- Gymnodinioides kozloffi Landers, 2004 - Ciliophora
- Myxobolus kozloffi Wyatt, 1979 - Cnidaria
- Tubificoides kozloffi Baker, 1983 - Oligochaeta
- Urceolaria kozloffi P.C. Bradbury, 1970 - Ciliophora

The following genera have been named in honor of Dr. Kozloff

- Kozloffia de Puytorac, 1968 - Ciliophora
- Kozloffiella Raabe, 1970 - Ciliophora
