= Pauline Smith (artist) =

British artist and provocateur

- Born: Pauline Elizabeth Smith; 5 September 1933; Kenya
- Died: 19 March 2017 (aged 83)
- Notable work: Adolf Hitler Fan Club (1974); Sun and Moon (2013)
- Movement: Mail art

Pauline Elizabeth Smith (5 September 1933 – 19 March 2017) was a British provocateur and artist who specialised in mail art. In later life she became fascinated by astrology and the "charismatic appeal" of Adolf Hitler.

== Early life ==
Smith was born in Kenya on 5 September 1933. Her father was a telecommunications engineer. The family lived in Uganda and Egypt before arriving in the United Kingdom in 1945. Smith was educated at a convent school in St. Albans which she left at the age of 16 against the wishes of her mother. She worked as a florist, a window dresser and for the BBC as a secretary.

Between 1962 and 1966, she took evening classes at Saint Martin's School of Art where she was taught by Anthony Caro and Elisabeth Frink. She took classes at the Chelsea School of Art in 1966–67 under Jeremy Moon, Robyn Denny and Anthony Hill. She spent two years as a school teacher from 1970 but left due to disillusionment about British teaching conditions.

== Art career ==
Sun & Moon, photograph, Pauline Smith, 2013.

Smith's first solo exhibition was in 1969 and her photographs and paintings were also shown in London and New York. In the early 1970s she began to create mail art after she met Opal L. Nations and was invited to join the Global Infantilism group. She knew Anna Banana, founder of Vile magazine, and Bill Gaglione.

Her work had a strong anti-establishment theme and her regular despatches included Lost Marbles Dump, which commented on property developers in Chelsea, and A Present From Belfast about the conflict in Northern Ireland. In 1974 she founded the Adolf Hitler Fan Club, of which she was probably the only member, and around the same time created an Adolf Hitler Memorial Fund collecting tin, in order to test the limits of free speech, provoke a reaction, and make an ironic and satirical comment on life in pre-Thatcher Britain. In 1977 she issued mail art signed "H Himmler". Postal emissions relating to the Hitler fan club resulted in a police raid on her home.

In 1983, she explained in her c.v.:

The ADOLF HITLER FAN CLUB was intended to be an analogy for the week-kneed [sic] British Governments since 1945 and was stimulated by local Chelsea politics regarding landlords/tenants/development/tourism, in which I was interested in the early seventies. Of course, this was not the only factor involved but it was the most pressing. The country is a mess and nothing gets any better. What I feel about the current situation will take several years more to express through my art. For the immediate present I am preoccupied with Adolf Hitler's involvement in the occult, the mediumistic nature of his public speaking and the mystery of his charismatic appeal to the multitudes ... Adolf Hitler remained the subject of my painting as he had been of my Mailart and I continue to paint about him because everything that has happened in this country since his death has been a reaction against him. He is the biggest influence on this country this century.

In 2006, she distributed Tombs of the Last (Species) to all members of Parliament followed by SPECIES TOMBS circulated to all MPs in 2008. In 2013 she produced Sun and Moon as a commentary on military action in the Middle East which featured a Sun and Moon, a carousel horse, and a tank against a split background with an Arabic language newspaper in the top half and a deconstructed American flag below.

She used antique black-and-white cameras to produce her mailart, until replacing those devices with a modern colour camera in 1998, and colour photography became her main medium for a time. She took pictures that she said were "inspired by ancient monuments, cultures, myths and flint simulacra gathered on Brighton beach which also could have interested our ancient ancestors." Extinctions was a series of 14 colour Xerox prints of inscribed photographs inspired by her interest in nature and animal forces. She created oil paintings from Second World War photographs and carved some ivory figures in order to undermine demand for the material.

== Personal life ==
Astrology played an important part in her life and her art from the early 1980s. She was greatly affected by Richard Houck's book The Astrology of Death (1994) and later produced astrological charts analysing the death of Alexander Litvinenko in 2006 and the 2008 financial crisis.

She was often in ill health and in 1990 was diagnosed with myalgic encephalomyelitis after having suffered periods of illness since the 1960s. Those who knew her described her as deeply reserved. She never married.

== Death and legacy ==
Smith died after a long illness on 19 March 2017. The Tate Gallery has around 30 boxes of her art and correspondence including her Adolf Hitler Memorial Fund collecting tin.
