= Jerry Baker (author) =

American writer (1931–2017)

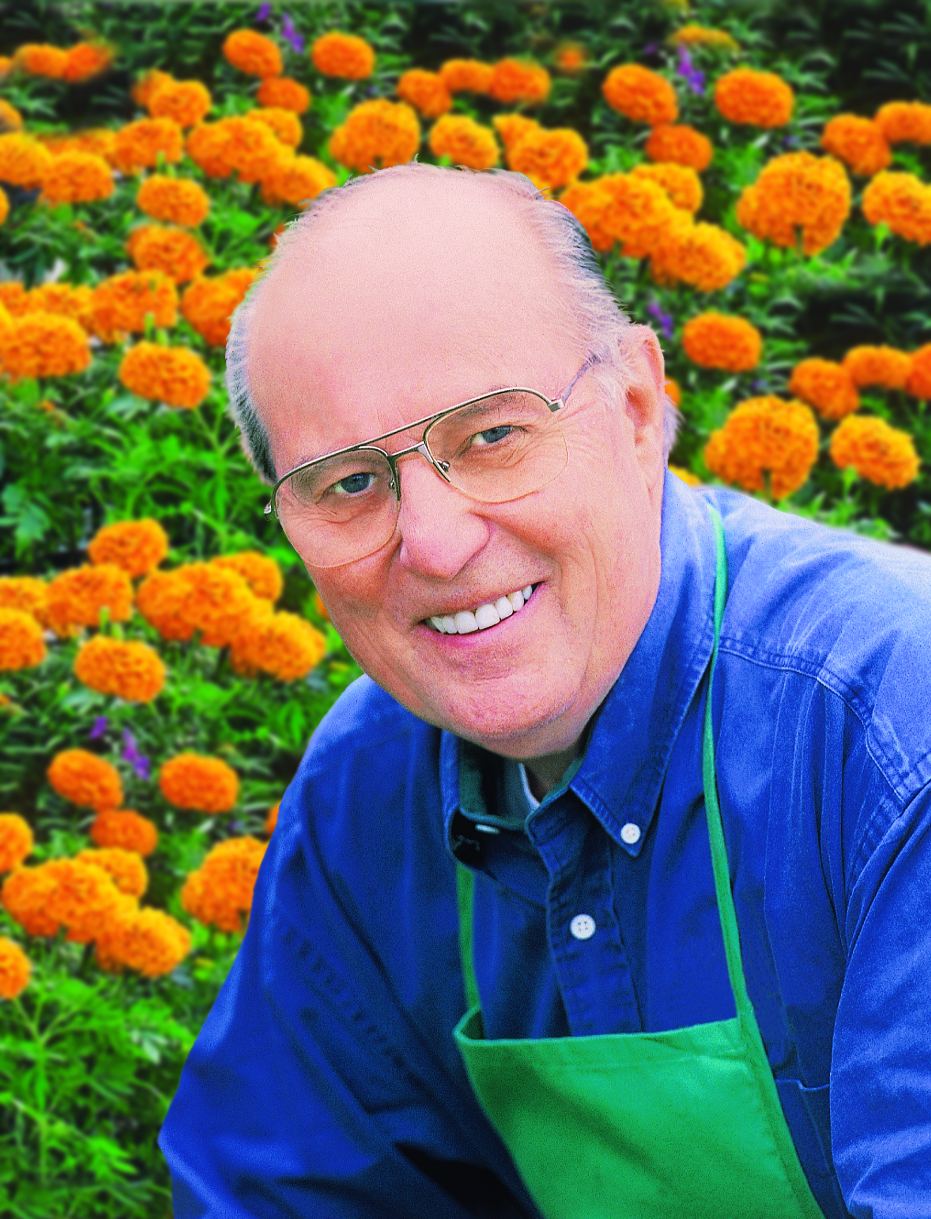
Jerry Baker

Gerald Fay Baker Jr. (June 19, 1931 – March 2, 2017) was an American author, entrepreneur, public speaker, and product spokesperson who wrote numerous books on gardening, home hints, and health topics. He was best known as "America's Master Gardener," and for creating his world-famous DIY tonics using common household products like beer, baby shampoo, castor oil, and mouthwash.

== Biography ==
Baker began his career in the 1960s as an undercover cop in Detroit, Michigan, posing as a gardener, tree trimmer, landscaper, and seed salesman. He left the police force and eventually went to work as a horticulture buyer for S. S. Kresge Corporation (which later became Kmart Corporation). Baker's interest in gardening led him to local radio and TV appearances in the Detroit area. He eventually became a frequent guest on Dinah Shore’s daytime TV show, Dinah’s Place. The exposure he received from his Dinah’s Place appearances prompted him to write his first best-selling book, Plants Are Like People, in 1971. A full-length record album by the same name was released shortly after the book was certified as a bestseller. Baker also began the national craze of talking to your plants with the publication of his second best-selling book, Talk to Your Plants, in 1973.

In the 1970s, Baker was a frequent guest on TV shows like The Mike Douglas Show, The Merv Griffin Show, and The Tonight Show Starring Johnny Carson. He hosted his own TV show, Plants Are Like People, on KMOX (a CBS affiliate) in St. Louis, MO. Baker also often appeared as a gardening expert on TV morning shows like Kennedy and Company in Chicago and on the ABC affiliates’ morning shows in New York City, Detroit, and Los Angeles.

In the 1990s and 2000s, Baker had his own series of gardening shows that ran on Public Television stations in the US and Canada. They were used by PBS as pledge drive specials; the programs featured Baker's down-home wisdom and commonsense solutions to gardening problems. These shows are now available on DVD (see below), and various segments can also be viewed on YouTube. Baker also has appeared on QVC, selling his own private label merchandise. From 1987 to 2007, Baker hosted his own national call-in radio show called On the Garden Line, which was produced by Westwood One and broadcast on the Mutual Broadcasting Network.

Over the years, Baker had served as a product spokesperson for Jacobsen Lawn Mowers, Hudson Sprayers, U.S. Gypsum, and Plantabs. His big break came from his affiliation with the Garden Weasel, a tool for loosening soil. Baker appeared as the Garden Weasel's spokesperson in advertising materials, including radio and TV ads, print, and point-of-purchase displays. He became widely recognized for his signature line in the Garden Weasel TV commercial, “If you’re into gardening like I am…” In 1982, Baker returned to his roots, becoming the national gardening spokesperson for Kmart Corporation's Garden Centers, a relationship that lasted until 1996.

In 1987, Baker helped found American Master Products, Inc. (AMP), a direct marketing and multi-media company based in Wixom, Michigan. AMP owns and manages the Jerry Baker brand, develops content and private label products, and negotiates licensing deals.

AMP has published more than 50 books under the Jerry Baker brand name, with more than twenty million copies sold worldwide. AMP also published the popular “On the Garden Line” newsletter between 1988 and 2008.

Baker died on March 2, 2017, at age 85.

== Books ==
- Plants Are Like People, 1971
- Talk to Your Plants, 1973
- Make Friends with Your Lawn, 1973
- Make Friends with Your Roses, 1973
- Make Friends with Your Annuals, 1973
- Make Friends with Your Fruit Trees, 1973
- Make Friends with Your Vegetable Garden, 1973
- Make Friends with Your Evergreens and Ground Covers, 1973
- Make Friends with Your Bulbs, 1973
- Make Friends with Your Shade Trees, 1973
- Make Friends with Your House Plants, 1973
- Make Friends with Your Flowering Trees, 1973
- Make Friends with Your Flowering Shrubs, 1973
- Make Friends with Your Perennials and Biennials, 1973
- I Never Met a House Plant I Didn't Like, 1974
- The Impatient Gardener, 1983
- The Impatient Gardener's Lawn Book, 1987
- Jerry Baker's Fast, Easy Vegetable Garden, 1999
- Jerry Baker's Flower Power!, 1999
- Jerry Baker's Happy, Healthy House Plants, 1999
- Jerry Baker's Herbal Pharmacy, 2009
- Jerry Baker's Giant Book of Kitchen Counter Cures, 2001
- Jerry Baker's Oddball Ointments, Powerful Potions, and Fabulous Folk Remedies, 2002
- Jerry Baker's Perfect Perennials!, 2003
- Jerry Baker's Anti-Pain Plan, 2004
- Jerry Baker's Backyard Problem Solver, 2004
- Jerry Baker's Flower Garden Problem Solver, 2004
- Jerry Baker's Giant Book of Garden Solutions, 2004
- Jerry Baker's Terrific Garden Tonics!, 2004
- Jerry Baker's Bug Off!, 2005
- Jerry Baker's Supermarket Super Products!, 2005
- Jerry Baker's Year-Round Bloomers, 2005
- Grandma Putt's Old-Time Vinegar, Garlic, Baking Soda, and 101 More Problem Solvers, 2006
- Jerry Baker's Backyard Bird Feeding Bonanza, 2006
- Jerry Baker's Cut Your Health Care Bills in Half!, 2006
- Jerry Baker's Great Green Book of Garden Secrets, 2006
- Jerry Baker's It Pays to be Cheap!, 2006
- Nature's Best Miracle Medicines, 2006
- Jerry Baker's Supermarket Super Remedies, 2006
- Jerry Baker's Amazing Antidotes, 2007
- Jerry Baker's Dear God...Please Help It Grow!, 2007
- Jerry Baker's Green Grass Magic, 2007
- Jerry Baker's Homespun Magic, 2007
- Jerry Baker's The New Healing Foods, 2007
- Jerry Baker's Old-Time Gardening Wisdom, 2007
- Secrets from the Jerry Baker Test Gardens, 2007
- Grandma Putt's Home Health Remedies, 2008 3rd ed
- Jerry Baker's All-American Lawns, 2008
- Jerry Baker's Backyard Birdscaping Bonanza, 2008
- Jerry Baker's Supermarket Super Gardens, 2008
- Jerry Baker's Can the Clutter!, 2009
- Jerry Baker's Cleaning Magic, 2009
- Jerry Baker's Speed Cleaning Secrets!, 2009
- Jerry Baker's Terrific Tomatoes, Sensational Spuds, and Mouth-Watering Melons, 2009
- America's Best Practical Problem Solvers, 2010
- Healing Fixers, Mixers, and Elixirs, 201
- Home, Health, and Garden Problem Solver, 2011
- Jerry Baker's Ultimate Household Tonics Book, 2011
- Jerry Baker's The New Impatient Gardener, 2012
- Jerry Baker's Solve It with Vinegar!, 2012
- Jerry Baker's Top 25 Homemade Healers, 2014
- Grandma Putt's Green Thumb Magic, 2015
- Jerry Baker's Cure Your Lethal Lifestyle!, 2015
- Healing Remedies Hiding in Your Kitchen, 2016
- Jerry Baker's Fix It Fast and Make It Last!, 2016
- Jerry Baker's Vinegar: The King of All Cures!, 2017
- Jerry Baker's Grow Younger, Live Longer!, 2017
- Jerry Baker's Live Rich, Spend Smart, and Enjoy Your Retirement!
- Jerry Baker's Baker's Dozen, 2021
- Jerry Baker's Quick "Cures," Handy Hints, and Super Solutions, 2022

== DVDs ==
- Jerry Baker's Garden of Herbal Delights
- Jerry Baker's Gardening Wisdom
- Jerry Baker's Gardening Special—Lawn Problems
- Jerry Baker's Gardening Special—Flower Power
- Jerry Baker's Gardening Special—Tree, Shrub & Evergreen Care
- Jerry Baker's Super Growing Secrets
- Jerry Baker's Amazing Houseplants Tips & Tricks
- Jerry Baker's Lawn Care Tips & Tricks
- Jerry Baker's Year ‘Round Flower Care
- Jerry Baker's Year ‘Round Lawn Care
- Jerry Baker's Year ‘Round Rose Care
- Jerry Baker's Year ‘Round Tree, Shrub & Evergreen Care
- Jerry Baker's Year ‘Round Vegetable Gardening
- Jerry Baker's Around the Yard I
- Jerry Baker's Around the Yard II
- Jerry Baker's Garden Magic I
- Jerry Baker's Garden Magic II
