= María Esther Vázquez =

Argentine writer

- Born: 4 August 1937; Buenos Aires, Argentina
- Died: 25 March 2017 (aged 79); Buenos Aires, Argentina
- Occupations: Writer, journalist
- Spouse: Horacio Armani (m. 1964; died 2013)

María Esther Vázquez (4 August 1937 – 25 March 2017) was an Argentine writer and journalist, best known as a collaborator and biographer of Jorge Luis Borges and Victoria Ocampo.

== Biography ==
She was born in Buenos Aires in 1937 into a family of Galician descent. Her father was born in Cambados, and her mother in Vilanova de Arousa. At 16, she entered the Universidad de Buenos Aires to study literature. In 1957, while working at the National Library, she met the library's director, Jorge Luis Borges. He introduced her to his fellow writers from Sur magazine.

At the beginning of the '60s, she dated Borges, and in February 1964 they announced their marriage, although several months later they split up. They remained friends and wrote a couple of books together. Vázquez wrote a biography on Borges, ten years after his death, called Borges: Esplendor y derrota (Borges: Splendor and Defeat).

== Personal life ==
She married poet and writer Horacio Armani on 14 December 1965. They were married for nearly 50 years before his death in 2013.

She died in Buenos Aires in March 2017 of a cerebral hemorrhage.

== Honors ==
Her honors included:

- 1988: Order of Merit of the Italian Republic
- 1987: Konex Award
- 1995: Comillas Prize of the Tusquets Publishing House in Spain
- 1997: Prize of the International Book Fair of Buenos Aires
- 2004: Konex Award
- 2012: Rosalía de Castro Award from the PEN Club of Galicia
- 2012: the Gold Medal of Emigration from the Federation of Spanish Societies of Argentina

== Bibliography ==
- Los nombres de la muerte (1964)
- Introducción a la literatura inglesa (1965); co-written with Jorge Luis Borges.
- Literaturas germánicas medievales (1966); co-written with Jorge Luis Borges.
- El mundo de Manuel Mujica Láinez (1983)
- Desde la niebla (1988)
- Victoria Ocampo (1993)
- Borges: esplendor y derrota (1996)
- Borges, sus días y su tiempo (1999)
- Victoria Ocampo. El mundo como destino (2002)
- La memoria de los días (2004)
