= Wallace Shoemaker =

American politician

Member of the Alabama House of Representatives from the 55th district
- In office 1978–1982

Personal details
- Born: December 8, 1931
- Died: March 21, 2017 (aged 85)
- Party: Democratic
- Education: Auburn University College of Pharmacy

Wallace Shoemaker (December 8, 1931 – March 21, 2017) was an American politician. He served as a member of the Alabama House of Representatives.

== Life and career ==
Shoemaker attended Auburn University College of Pharmacy.

Shoemaker was a Childersburg city councilman.

In 1978, Shoemaker was elected to represent the 55th district of the Alabama House of Representatives, serving until 1982.

Shoemaker died on March 21, 2017, at the age of 85.
