= John Collias =

American painter and illustrator

- Born: June 12, 1918; Fort Wayne, Indiana, U.S.
- Died: March 29, 2017 (aged 98)
- Education: American Academy of Art
- Notable work: A Portrait of A Distinguished Citizen
- Style: Portraiture, landscape art, wartime military posters, ad and billboard art
- Spouse: Lily

John George Collias (June 12, 1918 – March 29, 2017) was a Western American painter, illustrator, and commercial artist. Born in Fort Wayne, Indiana, he lived and worked in Boise, Idaho, since the early 1940s and contributed work to the Idaho Statesman, Boise Weekly, Life Magazine, the Gowen Field Beacon, the Allen Noble Boise State Athletic Hall of Fame, the College of Idaho Athletic Hall of Fame, and to the books Sawtooth Tales by Dick D'Easum and John Collias: Round About the Boise Valley. Collias' prolific work spans a number of genres including portraiture, landscape art, wartime military posters, ad and billboard art. He was perhaps best known regionally as the artist behind "A Portrait of A Distinguished Citizen," a weekly portrait feature that ran in the Idaho Statesman from 1963 to 1993.

== Military artwork ==
After enlisting in the army, Collias arrived in Boise in 1942 by train from his childhood home of Fort Wayne, IN, to be assigned to the Army Air Corps base at Gowen Field. While stationed at Gowen Field, he and his brother Nick began a regular portrait feature in the base newspaper the Gowen Field Beacon titled soldier of the week. The two also penned cartoons and propaganda posters in support of the war effort. One of John Collias’ posters, featuring a bomber pilot admonishing other pilots to "KNOW YOUR AIRCRAFT," was put into production by the army and posted in all Army Air Corps bases during 1943. Collias was stationed in England at the end of the war, at which time he had the opportunity to witness the iconic moment when many works by old masters such as Rembrandt van Rijn were returned to the walls at the National Gallery of Art in London.

== "Round About the Boise Valley" ==
After the war, Collias attended the American Academy of Art in Chicago, a prominent commercial art school of the time, in the hopes of finding work making movie posters or TV storyboards. After he graduated, he moved instead back to Boise with his wife Lily, a Boise native, and began working as an illustrator at the local daily the Idaho Statesman. Then-Idaho Statesman publisher Margaret Cobb-Ailshie gave Collias a half-page of space in each Saturday evening edition of the newspaper and an assignment to create a serial feature that echoed the format of Ripley’s Believe It or Not but took as its subject Boise and Idaho news. In response, Collias launched "Round About the Boise Valley," a hand-drawn and hand-lettered local news feature that ran in 50 installments from October 1950 through September 1951.

In the 2010 book John Collias: Round About the Boise Valley, author Nick Collias describes the feature thusly:

The "artist-reporter" covered boxing matches, beauty pageants and cattle brandings. He relayed personal anecdotes about random meetings on the street, dutifully acknowledged holidays like Flag Day and Dairy Month, and relayed seemingly every joke he overheard and ironic window-sign he spotted along his daily route. Each installment was capped off with a large and unapologetically accurate portrait of a local citizen, creating an overall impression somewhere between a yearbook and a phonebook. It was pure, unadulterated local color, screaming postwar-return-to-innocence in hand-drawn lettering across the Saturday evening edition.

Each cartoon included a portrait of a local citizen of Collias’ choosing, ranging from the local police chief to a maitre’d at a popular local restaurant. The feature also followed the rise of Harry "Kid" Matthews, a local heavyweight boxer who was rising to national prominence at the time. Collias’ feature covered the buildup to Matthews’ bout with then Heavyweight World Champion Rocky Marciano, who defeated Matthews handily in Madison Square Garden on July 28, 1952. Collias’ feature morphed soon after into simply "Portraits," a feature focusing largely on imminent Idaho businessmen such as J.R. Simplot and Idaho Power president Tom Roach.

In 1953, Collias moved to Chicago to be closer to his ailing mother, and his affiliation with the Idaho Statesman ceased for the time. During most of the 1950s and early 1960s, he attempted to find work as a commercial artist during the so-called Golden Age of advertising in Chicago. He drew cigarette billboards and submitted work to Coca-Cola and other prominent companies with ties to marketing firms in Chicago, but as none were accepted, Collias turned to factory work to support his family. His advertising work from this period was recently collected in the book John Collias: Round About the Boise Valley.

== "A Portrait of a Distinguished Citizen" and later work ==
Collias moved back to Boise in 1961, and after two years working as a cowboy for his father-in-law in remote Idaho, he and Statesman editor James Brown started up the "Portraits" feature again, this time under the title "A Portrait of a Distinguished Citizen." The feature was reader-nominated, and over its 30-year run included not only all of Idaho’s governors and Boise’s mayors, but also many prominent artists, musicians, and, to a large extent, common citizens who simply happened to be a local expert on some topic—a judge of international rock-collecting competitions, for instance. Collias' style of portraiture combines realism with a rough naturalistic touch, and the artist has referred to his technique in interviews as "scribblism."

During the 1970s Collias also began working with Boise State University, both as an occasional instructor and as an artist in residence. He designed the Athletic Department logo that represented the school during the 1980s and 90s, as well as the portraits filling the Allen Noble Boise State Athletic Hall of Fame. These years also saw him complete his largest work, a 10’ x 35’ mural titled "A Portrait of A Distinguished State," which served as the backdrop at National Bicentennial celebrations in Idaho during 1976. This project put to work the landscape skills Collias had been developing in his free time from Statesman work, and which featured prominently in the artist’s retrospective exhibition "John Collias: A Life in the Studio," which ran at the Idaho State Historical Museum in Boise in 2006.

In July 2010, over 225 of Collias’ works were collected in the book John Collias: Round About the Boise Valley, written by the artist’s grandson, journalist Nick Collias, and which featured an introduction by Statesman columnist Tim Woodward and a proclamation by Idaho Governor C.L. Butch Otter. The artist continued to work in Boise and contribute to Boise State and the College of Idaho's respective athletic halls of fame.
