= What Color Is Your Parachute? =

Book by Richard Nelson Bolles published in 1970

- 1974 edition
- Author: Richard Nelson Bolles
- Subject: Careers, job hunting
- Publisher: Ten Speed Press
- Publication date: 1970
- ISBN: 978-0-89815-844-1
- OCLC: 52840843

What Color Is Your Parachute? is a self-help book by Richard Nelson Bolles intended for job-seekers. It has been in print since 1970 and was revised annually by Bolles from 1975 till his death in 2017. Additional annual additions, until December, 2022, have been published since Bolles' death.

Bolles initially self-published the book on December 1, 1970, and it has been commercially published since November 1972 by Ten Speed Press in Berkeley, California. As of September 28, 2010, the book is available in 22 languages and used in 26 countries around the world. Over ten million copies have been sold worldwide. It is one of the most highly regarded career advice books in print. In the 2014 edition of the book, Bolles writes about how to adapt one's job search to the Internet age.

The book recommends networking to find "the person with the authority to hire you", rather than sending out resumes in bulk, shotgun fashion. It also recommends carefully figuring out what one is best at and what one enjoys most, which Bolles asserts tend to coincide. The Flower Exercise is a key element of the book, featuring seven ways that job seekers can define themselves in order to inform their job search.

Years later, Bolles explained the book's memorable title as his response at a business meeting in 1968 when someone told him that he and several co-workers were "bailing out" of a failing organization, prompting Bolles to joke, "What color is your parachute?". "The question was just a joke," he said. "I had no idea that it would take on all this additional meaning."

== Related media ==
Richard Nelson Bolles wrote numerous spinoffs of What Color Is Your Parachute?, targeted at specific audiences and career issues; he also collaborated with Mark Emery Bolles to write versions targeted at online job hunting. Additionally, in March 2013, Ten Speed Press released an app titled What Color Is Your Parachute? Job-Hunter’s Workbook Tablet Edition for the iPad and Nook.
