= Margaret Roberts (herbalist) =

South African herbalist and author

- Born: 1937
- Died: 4 March 2017 (aged 79–80)
- Other names: Known as the Doyenne of Herbs
- Citizenship: South African
- Occupations: Herbalist, Author

Margaret Joan Roberts (1937 – 4 March 2017) was a South African herbalist and author of over 40 books on herbs and related topics. Margaret Roberts brought herbs into South Africa over 60 years ago and gave lectures about the benefits of herbs and healthy living, her motto was to 'Educate and Inspire'. The Margaret Roberts Herbal Centre in De Wildt, North West Province was developed by Margaret and is named after her, this continues with her daughter Sandy Roberts who has worked with Margaret for 32 years. Margaret has lent her name to product ranges including food ranges, toiletries, gifts, kitchenware, stationery, textiles, seeds and books. The Margaret Roberts Herbal Centre is known to be one of the top ten gardens in South Africa. Margaret is well known for her Margaret Roberts lavenders which she cross cultivated over 15 years and which is endemic to South Africa, also known for her Ginger Rosemary, High Hopes Basil and Margaret Roberts Rose, all of these varieties are named after her.

She was a qualified physiotherapist and has received a Laureate Award from the University of Pretoria for being one of South Africa's first organic farmers.

== Books ==
Margaret Roberts wrote more than 40 books on herbs and related topics.

These include:

- A-Z of Herbs
- The Essential Margaret Roberts: My 100 Favourite Herbs
- Edible and Medicinal Flowers
- Alles oor Kruie (Afrikaans)
- Companion Planting
- Plantmaats (Afrikaans)
- Pregnancy and Child Care for Healthy Living
- Healing Foods
- The Forest Fairies and the Great Battle
- Herbal Teas for Healthy Living
- Pot-Pourri making
- Herbal Beauty for Healthy Living
- The Lavender Book
- 100 Edible & Healing Flowers: Cultivating, Cooking, Restoring Health
- My 100 Favourite Herbs
- 100 New Herbs including weeds
- Tissue Salts for Children: Babies, Tots, Teens
- Tissue Salts for Healthy Living
- Anti-aging Tissue salts
- Indigenous Healing plants including foraging plants
