= Job Durupt =

French politician

- Born: 15 February 1931; Nancy, France
- Died: 15 March 2017 (aged 86); Nancy, France
- Occupation: Politician
- Political party: Socialist Party

Job Durupt (15 February 1931 – 15 March 2017) was a French politician. He was the mayor of Tomblaine from 1971 to 2001. He served as a Socialist member of the National Assembly from 1981 to 1988, representing Meurthe-et-Moselle. He became an officer of the Legion of Honour in 2016.

== Biography ==
An Architect by profession, Job Durupt is the son of Léo Durupt and the father of four children, including photographer Gilles Durupt.

He was mayor of the municipality of Tomblaine (Meurthe-et-Moselle) from 1971 to 2001 and general councilor for the canton of Saint-Max from 1973 to 1982.

On July 2, 1981, he was elected deputy for the second constituency of Meurthe-et-Moselle with the Socialist Party (France). Re-elected twice in a row, he sat in the National Assembly until October 21, 1988, when he was replaced by Gérard Léonard after his election was invalidated.

Since the start of the 2021 school year, a newly built school in the town has been named after him.
