= Ursula Brunner =

Swiss politician (1925–2017)

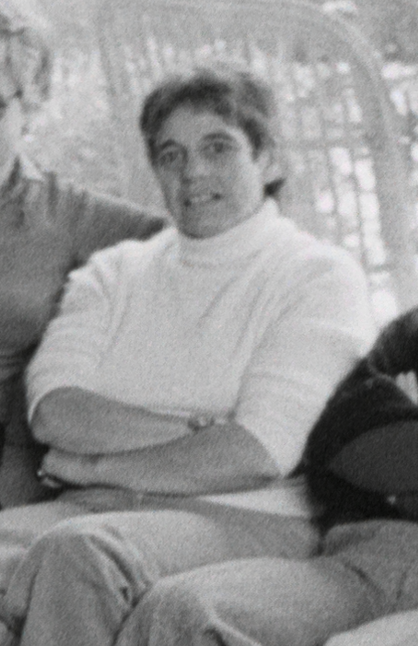
- Brunner at a meeting of the Bananenfrauen, 1977
- Born: Ursula Storz; 7 January 1925; Frauenfeld, Thurgau, Switzerland
- Died: 23 March 2017 (aged 92); Frauenfeld, Thurgau, Switzerland
- Education: University of Geneva
- Occupations: Fair-trade activist and politician
- Political party: FDP
- Movement: Bananenfrauen
- Spouse: Eugen Brunner
- Children: 9
- Awards: Kulturstiftung Landis & Gyr prize (2003); Women's Business award (HSLU, 2014)

Ursula Brunner (née Storz; 7 January 1925 – 23 March 2017) was a Swiss politician and advocate of fair trade. Known as the head of the Bananenfrauen ('Banana women') movement, she raised public awareness about the adverse conditions in some of the countries that produced goods for export to Switzerland, with the example of bananas. Her work drove Swiss retailers to add a surcharge of 15 centimes per kilogram on Chiquita and Dole bananas, which was in effect between 1974 and 1985 and was used to finance social aid projects in Latin America. In 1986, Brunner and the Bananenfrauen entered the market themselves by importing bananas from Nicaragua with the aim of providing a fairer alternative product. She served on the Grossrat (legislative council) of Thurgau for The Liberals (FDP) during 1975–1976 and 1978–1984. Brunner wrote three books: Bananas: A Citizens' Initiative for the Third World (1976), Bananenfrauen (1999), and Peaceful and Resistant: Women for Peace Switzerland (2006).

== Early life, education and family ==
Brunner was born on 7 January 1925, in Frauenfeld, Thurgau, Switzerland, to Otto Storz, a brewery entrepreneur, and Frieda Storz (née Beerli). She obtained the matura at the cantonal school of Frauenfeld in 1943, and began her medical studies at the University of Geneva, which she dropped in 1946. The same year, she married Eugen Brunner (1920–2013), a Protestant priest. Together, they had nine children. (Note: On her own account, she gave birth to nine children. Some sources say seven or eight. Some of her children passed away at a young age.) As a family, from the mid-1940s to the mid-1960s, they lived in Frauenfeld, Emmenbrücke, Zürich, and Schöftland, before returning to Frauenfeld in 1966 where they settled. Back in her birthplace, Brunner began working for the church as the head of the local women's group.

== Political career ==
=== Activism and the Bananenfrauen movement ===
In the early 1970s, Brunner became actively involved with the problems in the banana trade. The movie Bananera Libertad, 'Liberty banana plantation', by Peter von Gunten, whose screening she organized for her women's group, is often cited as an early event which sensitized her to the conditions under which imported bananas were produced.

In 1973, the Swiss retailer Migros announced a "banana miracle", a reduction in the price of bananas by 15 centimes, from CHF 1.5 per kilogram to CHF 1.35 in response to the dollar devaluation. This was met with objection from Brunner and her peers. The collective's proposal to Migros to keep the price at CHF 1.5 and use the 15 extra centimes to improve the working conditions of the banana farmers was rejected; Migros responded by saying "We are no charity". In October of the same year, Brunner and her group organized their first campaign to educate people on the pricing practices in the banana industry. The women carted about half a ton of bananas through Frauenfeld to give away together with an educational leaflet and collected signatures. This campaign was covered on national TV and the women's collective under Brunner became known as the Bananenfrauen ("Banana women").

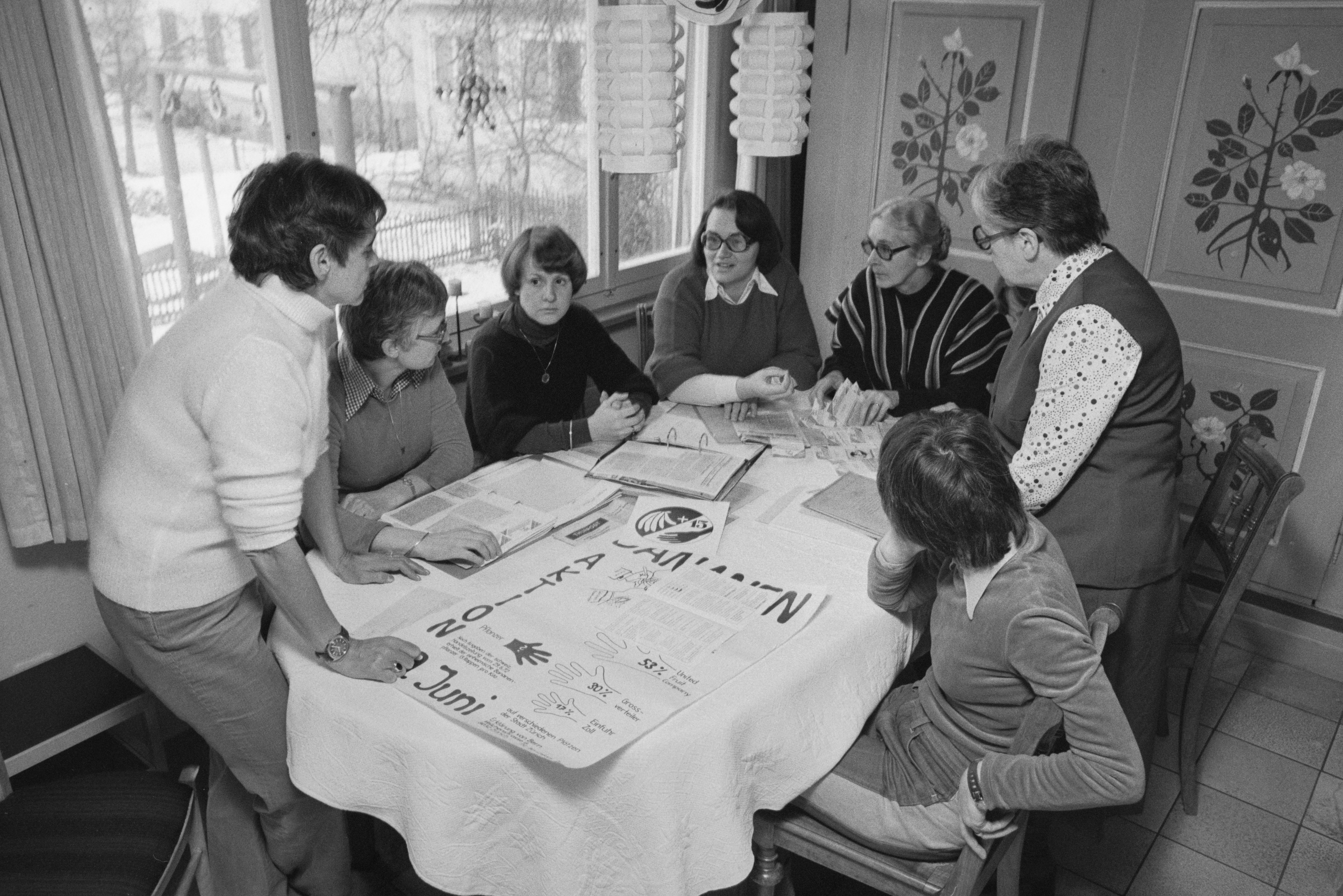
Ursula Brunner (first from the left) with the Bananenfrauen during a meeting to discuss a banana campaign in Frauenfeld (1977)

By 1974, Brunner and the Bananenfrauen had influenced about 100 Swiss retailers to apply a surcharge of 15 centimes per kilogram of Chiquita and Dole bananas, the amount of the 1973 price reduction of Migros. The proceeds from this surcharge were redistributed to Swiss social aid organizations and used to finance projects in Guatemala, Honduras, and Colombia. This campaign lasted until 1985. The women saw it only as a first step, as they sought to import their own bananas. To this end, Brunner traveled to Latin America to make contacts with exporters; her first visit was in 1976 to Guatemala.

It was not until a decade later when they could realize this goal. After the US declared an embargo against Nicaragua in 1985, Nicaraguan banana exporters were forced to pivot to selling to Europe, and the Bananenfrauen began importing Nicaraguan bananas to Switzerland in 1986. The Bananenfrauen described these bananas, later dubbed Nica-Bananen, as the first fairly produced bananas and sold them with the same 15 centime surcharge, which was similarly used to finance social aid programs in Latin America. In need of structured organization, the Bananenfrauen founded the gebana association in 1988. The sale of these bananas was discontinued in 1997, when the Max Havelaar Foundation launched their Fairtrade certified bananas, as gebana did not want to create competition on the market. Gebana was formalized into the joint-stock company gebana AG in 1998 and focused on other products.

Brunner is frequently described as a pioneer of fair trade in Switzerland. She was awarded the K.H. Gyr Prize for cultural, scientific, and social pioneer achievements in 2003, and the Women's Business award of the HSLU in 2014. Together with the Bananenfrauen, she received the Prize of Recognition of Frauenfeld in 2013.

=== Political career with the FDP ===
After the introduction of the women's right to vote in Thurgau in 1971, the FDP district party asked her to run for the Grossrat (legislative council) of Thurgau. She was elected in September 1975 to fill the vacancy left by Max Steiner (FDP) for a term length of half a year, as the first woman for the FDP and the third woman in total in the Grossrat. In 1978, she succeeded into the Grossrat again to replace Max Rutishauser (FDP) and was properly confirmed as a councillor in the elections of 1980.

Tensions between Brunner and the FDP arose in August 1982, when she organized a peace demonstration at the Wehrschau, a Swiss army show. A series of provocative articles in the Schweizerzeit sparked debates in Swiss media and prompted the FDP's confrontation of Brunner in which she described her commitment to her non-parliamentary activities. A party assembly in October voted to withdraw the party's trust in Brunner, meaning that she was not allowed to run for a seat in the Grossrat after her term ended in 1984.

== Later life and death ==
In her later life, Brunner remained active in the fair trade movement; she was a member of the board of directors of gebana until 2003. She later criticized the development of fair trade into a "static system" instead of a "continuous process". She stated that "fair trade has nothing to do with lifestyle and is no luxury which we afford every once a while, but a political necessity".

Brunner died on 23 March 2017 at the age of 92 in Frauenfeld.

== Works ==
- Brunner, Ursula (1979). Zum Beispiel Bananen--: eine Bürgerinitiative für die Dritte Welt [(The example of Bananas: A Citizens' Initiative for the Third World)]. Zeitbuchreihe Polis (in German). Basel: F. Reinhardt. ISBN 978-3-7245-0438-2.
- Brunner, Ursula (1999). Bananenfrauen [Banana women] (in German). Frauenfeld Stuttgart Wien: Huber. ISBN 978-3-7193-1171-1.
- Brunner, Ursula; Frauen für den Frieden Schweiz, eds. (2006). Friedfertig und widerständig: Frauen für den Frieden Schweiz [(Peaceful and Resistant: Women for Peace Switzerland)] (in German). Frauenfeld: Huber. ISBN 978-3-7193-1413-2.

== Awards ==
- K.H. Gyr-Preis für kulturelle, wissenschaftliche und soziale Pionierleistungen ('K.H. Gyr Prize for cultural, scientific, and social pioneer achievements'), Kulturstiftung Landis & Gyr, 2003
- Anerkennungspreis ('Prize of Recognition'), Frauenfeld, together with the Bananenfrauen, 2013
- Women's Business Award, HSLU, 2014

== Notes and references ==
- Grüter, Irene (8 February 2025). Ursula Brunner: Pionierin für gerechten Handel («Passage») (Podcast). SRF "Geschichte" (in German). Schweizer Radio und Fernsehen.
