= Maureen Lines =

British author and environmentalist (1937-2017)

Maureen P. Lines
- Born: 23 October 1937; North London, England
- Died: 17 March 2017 (aged 79); Peshawar, Pakistan
- Occupations: Social worker Environmentalist

Maureen Patricia Lines (23 October 1937 – 17 March 2017), locally known as Bibi Dow of Kalash, was a British author, photographer, social worker and environmentalist who was known for her work on the Kalasha people.

== Biography ==
Maureen Lines first visited Pakistan in 1980 and from then on spent her whole life in the preservation and promotion of Kalasha culture for which she was awarded the Tamgha-i-Imtiaz in 2008. She was co-founder of the Hindu Kush Conservation Association with Nicholas Barrington, the then British High Commissioner to Pakistan. She died in Peshawar at the age of 79 and was buried in the British cemetery.

== Books ==
She wrote the following books:

- Beyond the North-West Frontier: Travels in the Hindu Kush and Karakorams
- Journey through Jalalabad
- The Kalasha people of North-Western Pakistan
- The Last Eden
