= Derrick Baxby =

British microbiologist

Derrick Baxby (1940 – 24 March 2017) was a British microbiologist and authority on Orthopoxviruses. He was a senior lecturer in medical microbiology at the University of Liverpool.

He proposed that a presumed horsepox virus could be the long-sought ancestor of vaccinia. In 1977, he reported 12 cases of cowpox occurring in England between 1965 and 1976.

== Selected publications ==
- Jenner's Smallpox Vaccine: The Riddle of Vaccinia Virus and Its Origin. Heinemann Educational Books, London, 1981. ISBN 0435540572
- "Two hundred years of vaccination", Current Biology, Vol. 6 (1996), No. 7, pp. 769–772.
- "The End of Smallpox", History Today, Vol. 49, No. 3 (March 1999).
- "Edward Jenner's Inquiry; A Bicentenary Analysis", Vaccine, 1999 January 28;17(4):301-7.
