= Irena Homola-Skąpska =

Polish historian

Irena Homola-Skąpska (12 January 1929 – 4 March 2017, Kraków) was a Polish historian.

She graduated from the Jagiellonian University in 1951. In 1989, she was appointed professor. She collaborated with Polski Słownik Biograficzny since 1955.

== Works ==
- Mikołaj Zyblikiewicz (1823-1887) (1964)
- "Kwiat społeczeństwa...": (struktura społeczna i zarys położenia inteligencji krakowskiej w latach 1860-1914) (1984)
- Biografistyka w twórczości naukowej Stefana Kieniewicza (1993)
- Józef Dietl i jego Kraków (1993)
- Wspomnienie o Emanuelu Rostworowskim jako redaktorze Polskiego Słownika Biograficznego (1995)
- W salonach i traktierniach Krakowa: przemiany w środowisku społecznym Krakowa lat 1795-1846 (2000)
- 34 articles in Polski Słownik Biograficzny
