= Kim Bong-jo (swimmer) =

South Korean swimmer

Personal information
- Born: 13 January 1946
- Died: 8 March 2017 (aged 71)

Sport
- Sport: Swimming

Kim Bong-jo (13 January 1946 – 8 March 2017) was a South Korean freestyle swimmer. He competed in two events at the 1964 Summer Olympics.
