= Neelamana Madhavan Nampoothiri =

Indian historian (1943–2017)

N.M. Nampoothiri (Kizhakke Neelamana in Chengannur, 17 April 1943 – 30 March 2017) was an Indian historian and a former college professor at Malayalam PG Centre - Sree Punnasseri Neelakanta Sharma Memorial Government Sanskrit College, Pattambi, Palakkad District, Kerala. He died at Alappuzha at 12.30 hrs on 30 March 2017 after prolonged illness.

He participated in the two-day national seminar on "Rethinking Diamper: Religion, Canon, Polity and Society" held at Kochi on 16 and 17 September 2006.

Mamankam, an ancient festival held once in every 12 years at Thirunavaya, was re-enacted under his guidance in 1999. Later this attempt was appreciated by media including BBC.

Regarding the exact location of Muziris, N.M. Nampoothiri pointed out that it had not yet been conclusively established that Pattanam was the ancient port of Muziris.

In an interview with Asianet News in 2006, a Malayalam News Channel, he said the artifacts excavated so far from Pattanam do not prove the location is that of Muziris. His perspective on findings in Pattanam is that the excavated pottery sherds assures that they were here, but not assures there existed an ancient harbour.

According to Dr Roberta Tomber, of the British Museum, even if Muziris has been found, one mystery remains - just how it disappeared so completely in the first place. Muziris remains almost a mythical port, an ancient rendezvous for trade between Rome and southern India - but it appeared to have simply disappeared.

The sixth season of the Pattanam excavations which concluded before the onset of monsoon season in May 2012 found more pottery sherds from the site and attempts continue to identify the sherds.

== List of works ==
Tovari Rock cut Shelter: Nampoothiri identified and brought to light the Tovari, a prehistoric rock cut shelter of Edakkal series in collaboration with Dr. M.R. Raghava Varier. It was from the Edakkal Caves area, Dr. Varier found an ancient Tamil Brahmi inscription in February 2012.

Village to village heritage survey: In October 2013 he said a survey will be executed with the help of college students under village to village heritage survey.
