= Stephen Cosh =

Scottish cricketer

Personal information
- Full name: Stephen Hunter Cosh
- Born: 31 January 1920; Ayr, Scotland
- Died: 15 March 2017 (aged 97)
- Source: Cricinfo, 25 March 2017

Stephen Cosh (31 January 1920 – 15 March 2017) was a Scottish cricketer. He played 36 first-class matches for Scotland between 1950 and 1959.
