= Katherine Smith (Navajo activist) =

Indigenous rights activist

- Born: 1918 (?); Black Mesa, Arizona
- Died: 2017; Black Mesa, Arizona
- Occupations: Activist, cultural educator

Katherine Smith (1918–2017) was a Navajo activist, cultural educator, land defender, and resistor who protected Navajo land and refused to leave Big Mountain (Black Mesa). A 1985 documentary Broken Rainbow depicts the struggle of the Navajo amid government enforced relocation of thousands from Black Mesa in Arizona after the enactment of the Navajo-Hopi Land Settlement Act of 1974. The documentary film about the relocation was nominated for an Oscar.

She famously shot a rifle overhead as a warning to construction workers hired by the Bureau of Indian Affairs to build a fence between the Hopi and Navajo land in order to mine for uranium and coal for the coal company Peabody . In the 1988 documentary "Heart of Big Mountain," Smith said, “I was born from Big Mountain. That’s my mother. So all of my life I will always be thinking of this place. My spirit will be here forever.”

== Early life ==
Katherine Smith was born to the Tábąąhá clan. Her known family are her maternal and paternal grandfathers, Tł’ízíłání and Naakaii Dine’é, as well as her daughter Mary Katherine Smith. During the 1920s, Smith was required to attend an American Indian boarding school as a child. She describes this experience later in life as living within the "prison" of Western law.

== Activism ==
Smith implemented much of her knowledge about Diné philosophy to resist against the effects of the Navajo-Hopi Land Settlement Act of 1974. One Navajo philosophy in particular was the Native ties to the land based on the tradition of burying the Umbilical cord into the ground after a child is born, which Smith's own mother had practiced. This attachment to place fueled Smith's efforts in protecting the land she was raised in. When the Act was approved and the Bureau of Indian Affairs came to Big Mountain to build a fence, which would require her relocation in 1974, Smith armed herself with a rifle at their arrival. She fired a warning shot to defend her homestead, which drew the crews set to relocate her away. She was arrested for this, but was later acquitted and had no charges placed on her.

Throughout her life, she continued to advocate for the Navajo citizen's ancestral ties to the land to Big Mountain. In Fall of 2005, Smith wrote a letter to the U.S. government regarding how the settlement Act infringed on Dinétah : "According to our oral historical traditions, from the beginning of the Fifth World, the Holy People- placed us “the Dineh” with Natural Laws-here within the six sacred Mountains, between the Male and Female Rivers. This defines our sacred boundaries of “Dinetah”. Our sacred Mountain Bundles represent this Home, and our Laws."

Big mountain (Black Mesa) is remote rural area on the Hopi/Navajo Reservation where Kathrine Smith lived all her life. She died of natural causes on March 29, 2017 at 98, though some members of her family claim that she lived to over 100 due to her unknown birthdate. A celebration of her life was held open to the public on April 2, 2017 at Big Mountain.

== Publications ==
- Cheyfitz, E. (2006). The Columbia guide to American Indian literatures of the United states since 1945.
- Schwarz, M. T. (1997). Unraveling the Anchoring Cord: Navajo Relocation, 1974 to 1996. American Anthropologist, 99(1), 43-45. doi:10.1525/aa.1997.99.1.43
