= Tom Amberry =

American podiatrist

Tom Amberry (November 13, 1922 – March 18, 2017) was an American podiatrist who is best known for holding the Guinness world record for most consecutive free throws made, having made 2,750 of them in a row in a span of 12 hours over the course of November 15, 1993 at the age of 71. Amberry held the record for two and a half years before it was surpassed in April 1996 by Ted St. Martin. After setting his record, he worked with several teams, including the Chicago Bulls to help the players with their free throw shooting.

After graduating college he decided to forgo a two-year contract to play with the then-Minneapolis Lakers, choosing to attend podiatry school instead. His medical office was located on Atlantic Avenue in Long Beach, California.
