= Léonard Legault =

- Born: Léonard Hilarion Joseph Legault; February 19, 1935; Gravelbourg, Saskatchewan, Canada
- Died: March 17, 2017 (aged 82); Ottawa, Ontario
- Known for: Diplomat
- Awards: Order of Canada

Léonard Hilarion Joseph Legault, OC QC (February 19, 1935 – March 17, 2017) was a Canadian diplomat.

== Biography ==
Born in Gravelbourg, Saskatchewan, Léonard Legault was the son of Donat Legault and Ludivine Morin. He received a Bachelor of Arts degree in 1957 and a Bachelor of Law degree in 1959 from the University of Saskatchewan. He was called to the Alberta Bar in 1961. He was made a Queen's Counsel in 1981.

He joined the Department of External Affairs in 1962 and served until 1973 in Ottawa, Warsaw, New Delhi, and Geneva. From 1973 to 1977, he was the Director-General of the International Fisheries and Marine Directorate. During this mandate, he worked on defining a legal frame for the extension of Canada's jurisdiction. Around From 1977 to 1979, he was the High Commissioner for Canada to Nigeria and Sierra Leone.

From 1979 to 1980, he was the Director-General in the Legal Bureau of External Affairs and Legal Adviser from 1980 to 1986. From 1982 to 1984, he was the Ambassador and agent for Canada in the Gulf of Maine Maritime Boundary Case before the International Court of Justice.

In 1986, he was appointed Assistant Deputy Minister, External Affairs and from 1986 to 1990, he was the Minister (Economics) and Department Head of Mission in the Canadian Embassy in Washington, D.C. From 1984 to 1987, he was a Member of the Permanent Court of Arbitration.

From 1990 to 1993, he was the Senior Assistant Deputy Minister (U.S.) and Co-ordinator for the Free Trade Agreement, External Affairs and International Trade. From 1993 to 1997, he was Ambassador Extraordinary and Plenipotentiary to the Holy See. In 1997, he was appointed Commissioner of the Canadian Section of the International Joint Commission (IJC).

In 1987, he was made an Officer of the Order of Canada for his "superb legal mind, keen negotiating skills, and staunch moral integrity in defence of Canadian interests". He is the 1986 recipient of the Outstanding Achievement Award of the Public Service of Canada.

Legault died on March 17, 2017.

== Publications ==
- Donat Pharand, Léonard H. Legault, The Northwest Passage: Arctic Straits, Martinus Nijhoff Publishers, 1984 ISBN 9789024729791
- Léonard Legault, Canadian Arctic Waters Pollution Prevention Legislation in The law of the sea The United Nations and ocean management, Law of the Sea Institute, Kingston, 1971
- Blair Hankey, Léonard Legault, Method, oppositeness and adjacency, and proportionality in maritime boundary delimitation in International maritime boundaries, ed. Martinus Nijhoff, Boston, 1993
- Léonard Legault, Gravelburg and other places, Windsor, Ont. : University of Windsor Press : Sesame Press, 1974 ISBN 096904643X

== Private life ==
Léonard Legault married Veronica Kulchyski in 28 November 28, 1959.
