= William Sanders (statistician) =

American statistician (1942–2017)

William L. Sanders (26 April 1942 – 16 March 2017) was an American statistician, a senior research fellow with the University of North Carolina at Chapel Hill. He developed the Tennessee Value-Added Assessment System (TVAAS), also known as the Educational Value-Added Assessment System (EVAAS), a method for measuring a teacher's effect on student performance by tracking the progress of students against themselves over the course of their school career with their assignment to various teachers' classes.

== Life ==
Sanders was born in 1942 in Shelbyville, Tennessee and received a bachelor of science degree in animal science (1964) and a doctorate in statistics and quantitative genetics (1968) from the University of Tennessee. From 1972 to 2000, Sanders was a statistical consultant for the Institute of Agricultural Research, which is part of the UT system; he also was an adjunct professor in the school's College of Business. Sanders left the university to join the SAS Institute.

In 2015, Sanders was awarded the James Bryant Conant Award.

He died on 16 March 2017 at the age of 74.

== Value-added assessment ==
Sanders's primary contributions, however, were in education. In 1982, Sanders happened upon a newspaper article about attempts by then-Governor Lamar Alexander to introduce merit pay for teachers, which raised questions as to the qualifications for merit. He sent a letter to the governor explaining a potential method, and while he did not use it, the idea was revived eight years later by Ned McWherter. The system depends on calculating expected versus actual growth trajectories for students as scored on standardized exams; these "value-added" scores fell into a bell curve. Tennessee began using the system in 1993, and it since has been adopted by a number of other school districts across the United States. Sanders' approach has been used to support the theory that the quality of teachers is central to educational achievement.

The Pennsylvania and New Hampshire Departments of Education sponsor pilots, and the Iowa School Board Association sponsors his value-added work in that state. Battelle for Kids provides interpretation and use trainings for the SAS EVAAS services for the participating districts in Ohio.

"Using mixed model equations, TVAAS uses the covariance matrix from this multivariate, longitudinal data set to evaluate the impact of the educational system on student progress in comparison to national norms, with data reports at the district, school, and teacher levels." The model focuses on academic gains rather than raw achievement scores.

=== Criticism ===
Dr. Ballou, in Lissitz (Ed.), 2005, "Value Added Models in Education: Theory and Applications," analyzed the TVAAS and determined that value added-assessment of teachers are fallible estimates of teacher contribution to student learning, stating that standard errors of value-added estimates are large. Author thinks that value added models are merely one useful tool that should be used as one of many assessments in a comprehensive system of evaluation.

Researchers from the RAND Corporation studied Dr. Sanders' method and determined that his approach does not satisfactorily account for bias, cautioning that non-educational effects may be attributed by mistake to teachers, with no way of effectively determining the magnitude of the error. Ballou (2002) and Kupermintz (2003) further support this claim, claiming that non-educational factors have a noticeable impact on the evaluation of teachers despite efforts to account for them in the model.

The use of merit pay based on VAM has been discredited in articles by Dan Pink and more generally as a business practice in the Harvard Business Review. The accuracy of VAM for evaluating individual teachers has been further discredited by the Economic Policy Institute and by mathematician John Ewing.

== See also ==
- Educational evaluation
- Evaluation
- Standardized testing and public policy
