= Andy Coogan =

Scottish author

- Born: 1 April 1917; Glasgow, Scotland
- Died: 22 March 2017 (aged 99)
- Spouse: Myra Greig (m. 1947; died 2013)
- Children: 3
- Relatives: Chris Hoy (great-nephew)
- Writing career
- Notable work: Tomorrow You Die

Andy Coogan (1 April 1917 – 22 March 2017) was a Scottish author, World War II veteran and middle-distance runner.

== Biography ==
Coogan was born in Glasgow, the oldest child of poor Irish immigrants.

His promising athletic career was interrupted by the outbreak of World War II. As a young man, he was a mile runner and his goal was to compete in the Olympic Games for Great Britain, but the consequences of war and imprisonment left him physically unable to continue this pursuit.

Captured during the Fall of Singapore, Coogan was interned at the Changi camp (site of the modern day Changi Prison) before being transported to Taiwan, where he worked as a slave in a copper mine and was twice ordered to dig his own grave. He was later sent to Japan on a hell ship voyage that nearly killed him.

After the war, Coogan returned to Scotland and founded Tayside Amateur Athletic Club, competing in veteran athletics, coaching, and devoting himself to encouraging everyone in the community to participate in sport.

In August 2012, Mainstream Publishing published Coogan's autobiography Tomorrow You Die: The Astonishing Survival Story of a Second World War Prisoner of the Japanese - the story of his 'poverty-stricken boyhood in the slums of the Gorbals to the atomic wasteland of Nagasaki'.

== Personal life ==
Coogan and his wife of 65 years, Myra, had three children: Andy, Christine and Jean. He was the great-uncle of six-time Olympic champion Chris Hoy. Coogan died on 22 March 2017, ten days before his 100th birthday.

== London 2012 Olympic torch relay ==
On 12 June 2012, Coogan took part in the 2012 Summer Olympics torch relay. Nominated to be one of 8,000 torchbearers by Hoy, Coogan carried the flame on a leg near Dundee - to 'rapturous applause' from the watching public.

== Tomorrow You Die ==
Coogan's memoir was published on 23 August 2012. It was well received at the Edinburgh International Book Festival, with The Scotsman hailing the event as one of "those when can you forget it's anything at all to do with the selling of books. Instead, it's just you listening to someone telling stories that go straight from their heart into yours. So it was with Mr Coogan."

== Works ==
- Tomorrow You Die: The Astonishing Survival Story of a Second World War Prisoner of the Japanese (Mainstream, 2012)
