= Xu Zuyao =

Chinese materials scientist (1921–2017)

- Born: 21 March 1921; Ningbo, Zhejiang, China
- Died: 7 March 2017 (aged 95); Ningbo, Zhejiang, China
- Education: National Yunnan University

Xu Zuyao (Chinese: 徐祖耀; pinyin: Xú Zǔyào; Wade–Giles: Hsü Tsu-yao; 21 March 1921 – 7 March 2017) was a Chinese materials scientist. Focused on Martensitic transformation and Bainitic transformation, Xu was a pioneer in mainland China.

Since 1983, Xu was a member and honorable member of International Advisory Committee of Martensitic Transformations and later became a member of International Committee of Bainite.

Born in 1921 at rural area of Ningbo, Xu completed his earlier education at local schools. Then he studied at the Department of Metallurgy, National Yunnan University during 1938–1942. He stayed there as an Assistant Lecture after graduation. He went to Chongqing and Nanjing, served as a technician at Munitions Bureau afterwards. He began to teach at Tangshan Jiaotong University as associate professor since 1949. Then he was sent to Beijing Iron and Steel College in 1953. Eight years later, he was transferred to Shanghai Jiao Tong University, where he held successively the post of associate professor, professor and pean. In 1990, he was appointed as a visiting professor at Katholieke Universiteit Leuven.

Xu was elected as an Academician of Chinese Academy of Sciences in 1995.

Xu lived a frugal life and never married. He made substantial donations to charity.
