= Mireille Cébeillac-Gervasoni =

Mireille Cébeillac-Gervasoni (7 April 1942 – 29 March 2017) was a French director of research at the CNRS in Paris. She was a specialist of Latin epigraphy and Republican and Imperial Roman history who published numerous research on the ruling local elites of the Roman Republic and early Roman Empire. She also devoted much time on the history and epigraphy of Ostia Antica.

A member of the École française de Rome, she worked at the CNRS from December 1985 and headed the "Centre de recherche archéologique Jean Bérard" at the Palazzo dell'Istituto Grenoble.

She conducted archaeological excavations at Megara Hyblaea (Sicily).

== Bibliography ==
See her detailed bibliography on the site of the ANHIMA.

=== Scientific works ===
- Les quaestores principis et candidati aux Ie–IIe de l’Empire, Milan, 1973.
- Les magistrats des cités italiennes de la seconde guerre punique à Auguste. Le Latium et la Campanie, Rome, 1998, BEFAR 299.

=== Direction d'ouvrages ===
- Les élites de l’Italie péninsulaire des Gracques à Néron, Naples-Rome, 1996.
- Les élites de l’Italie péninsulaire de la mort de César à la mort de Domitien entre rupture et continuité. Classes sociales dirigeantes et pouvoir central, Actes du Colloque de Naples 6-8 février 1997, Collection de l’EFR 271, Rome, 2000.
- in collaboration with Laurent Lamoine and Frédéric Trément, Les élites et leurs facettes. Les élites locales dans le monde hellénistique et romain, Actes du colloque international de Clermont-Ferrand, 24-26 novembre 2000, Collection ERGA n° 3 de PUPB en coédition with the École Française de Rome : Collection de l'EFR 309, Rome-Clermont-Ferrand, 2003.
- in collaboration with Laurent Lamoine and Frédéric Trément, Autocélébration des élites locales dans le monde romain : contextes, images, textes (IIe s. av. J.-C. / IIIe s. ap. J.-C.), Actes du colloquee international des 21-23 novembre 2004, Clermont-Ferrand, Collection ERGA, 2004.
- in collaboration with Clara Berrendonner and Laurent Lamoine, Le quotidien municipal dans l'Occident romain, Presses universitaires Blaise-Pascal, Clermont-Ferrand, 2009.

=== University textbooks ===
- in collaboration with J.-P. Martin and A. Chauvot, Histoire romaine, Collection « U », Armand Colin, Paris, 2001, 2003.
- in collaboration with Maria Letizia Caldelli and Fausto Zevi, Épigraphie latine, Armand Colin, Paris, 2006, ISBN 2-200-21774-9.

=== Selection of articles ===
- « Octavie, épouse de Gamala, et la Bona Dea », MEFRA, 1973, 85–2, p. 517-553 Read online.
- en collaboration avec Fausto Zevi, « Révision et nouveautés pour trois inscriptions d'Ostie », MEFRA, 1976, 88–2, p. 607-637 Read online.
- « L'évergétisme des magistrats du Latium et de la Campanie des Gracques à Auguste à travers les témoignages épigraphiques », MEFRA, 1990, 102–2, p. 699-722 Read online
