= František Gaulieder =

Slovak politician

Member of the National Council
- In office 1994 – December 1996

Personal details
- Born: 18 January 1951
- Died: 25 March 2017 (aged 66)
- Party: Movement for a Democratic Slovakia
- Occupation: politician

František Gaulieder (18 January 1951 – 25 March 2017) was a Slovak politician. Elected to the National Council in 1994, he was expelled from the legislature in a December 1996 vote. A July 1997 ruling by the Constitutional Court of Slovakia held that Gaulieder's constitutional rights had been violated. As a result of the scandal, Slovakia was barred from joining the European Union for a time.

Gaulieder was hit by a train in March 2017, and died at the age of 66.
