= Gina Calleja =

Canadian author and illustrator

- Born: Jean Gadsby; March 12, 1928; Lowestoft, England
- Died: March 7, 2017 (aged 88)
- Education: Reading University; Slade School of Fine Art
- Occupations: author and illustrator
- Spouse: Joseph Calleja

Gina Calleja, born Jean Gadsby, (March 12, 1928 – March 7, 2017) was an author and illustrator of children's books in Canada.

== Personal life and education ==
Calleja was born Jean Gadsby in Lowestoft, England. She studied art at Reading University and London University's Slade School of Fine Art.

She married Joseph Calleja, a painter and sculptor from Malta, and the pair moved to Canada in 1958.

She died March 7, 2017.

== Career ==
Calleja worked as a secondary school teacher in Toronto. In 1980, she created the illustrations for Caroline Beech's Peas again for lunch. Soon after, she illustrated two of Frank Etherington's stories, The Spaghetti Word Race and Those Words.

Calleja created her first children's book as an author in 1983, entitled Tobo Hates Purple. She continued to write and illustrate over the next two decades; her most recent book is Great Food for Happy Kids in 2001.

== Publications ==
=== As author ===
- Tobo Hates Purple, 1983
- Wizzo and the Cookie Babies, 1994
- Bloor and Christie, 1998

=== As illustrator ===
- Peas Again for Lunch, 1980.
- The Spaghetti Word Race, 1981
- Those Words, 1982
- Great Food for Happy Kids, 2001
