= Mahlon E. Doyle =

American cryptologist, inventor, and author (1924–2017)

- Born: June 14, 1924; North Baltimore, Ohio, U.S.
- Died: March 4, 2017 (aged 92); Silver Spring, Maryland, U.S.
- Occupations: Cryptographer, mathematician
- Spouse: Lana Starner (August 10, 1946 - d. February 2, 2012)
- Children: 2
- Awards: Exceptional Civilian Service Award

Mahlon E. Doyle (June 14, 1924 – March 4, 2017) was an American cryptologist, inventor, and author. He held a three-decade career at the National Security Agency and its predecessor organizations.

== Biography ==
Doyle was born in North Baltimore, to Carl and Flossie (née Michener) Doyle. He married Lana Starner on August 10, 1946. During World War II, Doyle served in the U.S. Army, working on the SIGSALY voice encryption system.

Doyle's career began in 1949 as a cryptanalyst studying electronic key generators. He used mathematical notation to describe the motion of key generators and applied mathematical techniques to analyze them.

In 1956, Doyle joined COMSEC Research and Development as a cryptomathematician. By 1961, he had risen to Chief of his division, a position he held until 1977, when he was named Senior Cryptographer. The division was responsible for designing the cryptographic algorithms used by the U.S. and its Allies to protect classified information and the U.S. Nuclear Command and Control System.

Doyle designed the cryptologics for major COMSEC systems used by the United States government for four decades. From the 1960s onward, most U.S. COMSEC equipment used cryptologics that were either designed by Doyle or designed by others based on his research. He designed key management schemes that decreased the amount and cost of physically distributing key material.

== Personal life and death ==
Doyle married Lana Starner on August 10, 1946. She died on February 2, 2012. The couple had two daughters, Laurie and Nancy, both of whom predeceased their father. Doyle died in Silver Springs, Maryland on March 4, 2017, aged 92. He was survived by two grandchildren, Kathleen and Joshua. He was interred in Benton Cemetery, Crawford County, Ohio.
