= Bob Altman =

American comedian

Bob Altman (September 11, 1931 – March 10, 2017) was an American comedian and free-associating thinker more popularly known as Uncle Dirty. He wrote for Richard Pryor. Altman is also known for playing Karen's Dad in the 1990 movie Goodfellas. At the height of his career, Altman put out comedy albums in the early 1970s as much of his act was too risque for television.

He is the father of comedian Carlen Altman.
