= Alain Levoyer =

French property lawyer and politician (1940–2017)

- Born: 20 September 1940; Nantes, France
- Died: 10 March 2017 (aged 76)
- Occupations: Property lawyer, politician

Alain Levoyer (20 September 1940 – 10 March 2017) was a French property lawyer and politician. He served as a member of the National Assembly from 1993 to 1997, where he represented Maine-et-Loire. He was also the mayor of Champtoceaux from 1977 to 2001.
