= Manfred Weiß =

German politician (1944–2017)

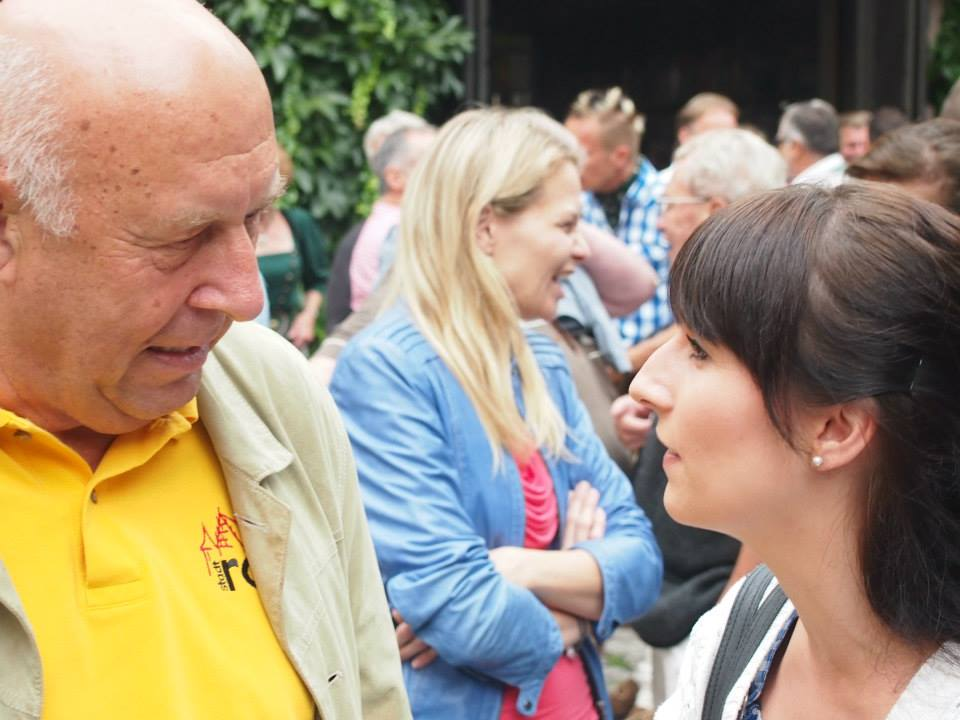

Minister of Justice of Bavaria
- In office 13 September 1999 – 14 October 2003
- President: Edmund Stoiber
- Preceded by: Alfred Sauter
- Succeeded by: Beate Merk

Personal details
- Born: 23 January 1944 Roth, Bavaria, Germany
- Died: 11 March 2017 (aged 73)
- Party: Christian Social Union in Bavaria

Manfred Weiß (23 January 1944 – 11 March 2017) was a German politician, jurist and member of the Christian Social Union in Bavaria (CSU). He served as a member of the Landtag of Bavaria, the state parliament, from 1978 until 2013, and the Minister of Justice of Bavaria from 1999 to 2003.

Weiß was born in Roth, Bavaria on 23 January 1944. He studied law at the University of Erlangen-Nuremberg from 1965 to 1969. He then served as a judge of the Nürnberg-Fürth district court from 1973 to 1978.

Manfred Weiß joined the Christian Social Union in Bavaria (CSU) in 1968. In 1978, he was first elected to the Landtag of Bavaria, where he served from 1978 to 2013. In 1999, Bavarian Minister-President Edmund Stoiber appointed Weiß as the state Minister of Justice, which Weiß considered the highlight of his political and legal career. Weiß served as Minister of Justice from 1998 until a cabinet shake-up by Stoiber in October 2003.

Manfred Weiß died on 11 March 2017 at the age of 72.
