= Bromsgrove Festival =

The Bromsgrove Festival is a classical music festival, that has been held annually in Bromsgrove since it was founded in 1960 by Joe Stones, a violinist and the founder of the Bromsgrove String Orchestra.
