= Giovanni Palamara =

Italian politician and lawyer (1938–2017)

Mayor of Reggio Calabria
- In office 14 February 1984 – 8 September 1985
- Preceded by: Michele Musolino
- Succeeded by: Pino Mallamo

Personal details
- Born: 29 October 1938
- Died: 4 March 2017 (aged 78)
- Party: Italian Socialist Party

Giovanni Palamara (29 October 1938 – 4 March 2017) was an Italian politician, lawyer and member of the Italian Socialist Party (PSI). He served as the Mayor of Reggio Calabria, the largest city in the region of Calabria, from 1984 to 1985. He also served as a member and Vice President of the Regional Council of Calabria.

Palamara died on 4 March 2017, at the age of 78.
