= Cyprian Ojwang Omollo =

Kenyan politician

Cyprian Ojwang Omollo (died 3 March 2017) was a Kenyan politician. He belonged to the Orange Democratic Movement and was elected to represent the Uriri Constituency in the National Assembly of Kenya since the 2007 Kenyan parliamentary election. He lost his seat in the 2013 elections.
