= Michael P. Mitchell =

American politician (1925–2017)

Mike Mitchell

Member of the Idaho House of Representatives
- In office 2002–2006; 1968–1970

Member of the Idaho Senate
- In office 1970–1982

Personal details
- Born: Michael Mitchell; June 5, 1925
- Died: March 3, 2017 (aged 91) Boise, Idaho, U.S.
- Party: Democratic
- Spouse: Arlene R. Harvey (m. 1950–2017)
- Children: 3
- Education: University of Oregon (BA)

Military service
- Branch/service: United States Navy
- Battles/wars: World War II

Michael P. Mitchell (June 5, 1925 – March 3, 2017) was an American politician and political advisor who served as a member of the Idaho House of Representatives and Idaho Senate.

== Early life and education ==
Mitchell was raised in Lewiston, Idaho and attended St. Joseph's Military School in Belmont, California. In 1940, Mitchell returned to Lewiston to complete high school. During World War II, Mitchell served in the United States Navy as a machinist. After the war, Mitchell earned a Bachelor of Arts degree in journalism from the University of Oregon.

== Career ==
After graduating from college, Mitchell worked for his father's beer distribution company, which later became a local distributor of Coors Brewing Company. In 1968, Mitchell was elected to serve as a member of the Idaho House of Representatives. After serving one term, he was elected to the Idaho Senate, serving for six terms. In 1982, Mitchell was an unsuccessful candidate for Lieutenant Governor of Idaho. Mitchell later served as a legislative liaison for Governor John Evans and chief of staff for Governor Cecil Andrus. He also served as interim director of the Idaho Department of Correction. Mitchell was re-elected to the Idaho House of Representatives in 2002, serving until 2006.

== Personal life ==
Mitchell and his wife, Arlene R. Harvey, married in 1950. They had three daughters. Mitchell died at the Boise VA Medical Center in Boise, Idaho on March 3, 2017, at the age of 91.
