= Ron Van Ryswyk =

American football coach (1930–2017)

Biographical details
- Born: May 1, 1930; Pleasantville, Iowa, U.S.
- Died: March 4, 2017 (aged 86); Des Moines, Iowa, U.S.

Coaching career (HC unless noted)
- 1961–1966: Frostburg State

Head coaching record
- Overall: 21–27

Ronald Lester Van Ryswyk (May 1, 1930 – March 4, 2017) was an American football coach. He was the first head football coach at the Frostburg State University in Frostburg, Maryland, serving for six seasons, from 1961 to 1966, and compiling a record of 21–27.
