= 2017 in New Zealand =

- Decades: 1990s; 2000s; 2010s; 2020s
- See also: History of New Zealand; List of years in New Zealand; Timeline of New Zealand history

The following lists events that happened during 2017 in New Zealand.

== Population ==
=== National ===
Estimated populations as at 30 June.

- New Zealand total – 4,793,700
- North Island – 3,677,200
- South Island – 1,115,800

=== Main urban areas ===
Estimated populations as at 30 June.

- Auckland – 1,534,700
- Blenheim – 31,300
- Christchurch – 396,700
- Dunedin – 120,200
- Gisborne – 36,600
- Hamilton – 235,900
- Invercargill – 50,800
- Kapiti – 42,300
- Napier-Hastings – 133,000
- Nelson – 66,700
- New Plymouth – 57,500
- Palmerston North – 85,300
- Rotorua – 58,800
- Tauranga – 137,900
- Wellington – 412,500
- Whanganui – 40,300
- Whangārei – 57,700

== Incumbents ==
=== Regal and vice-regal ===
- Head of State – Elizabeth II
- Governor-General – Patsy Reddy
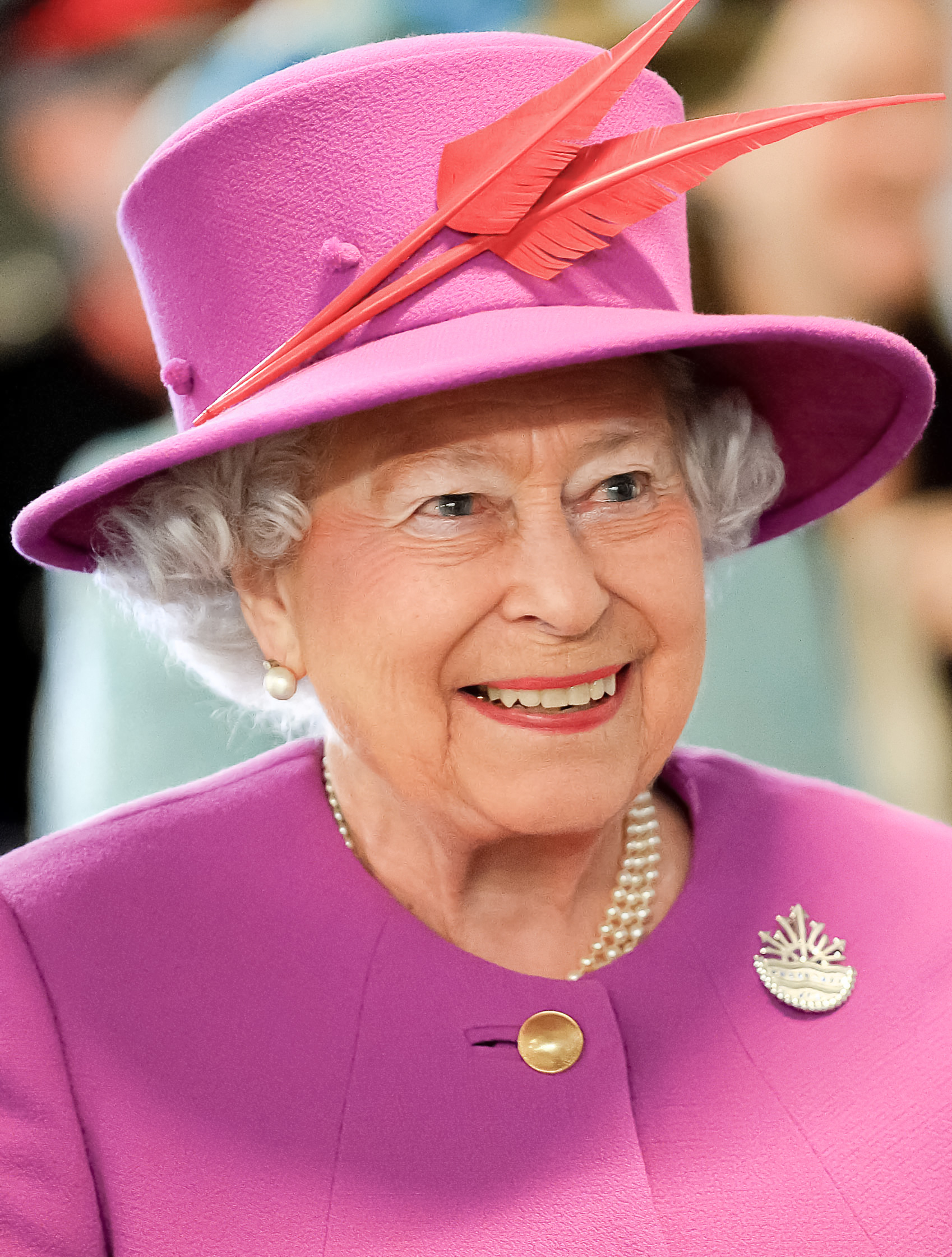
Elizabeth II

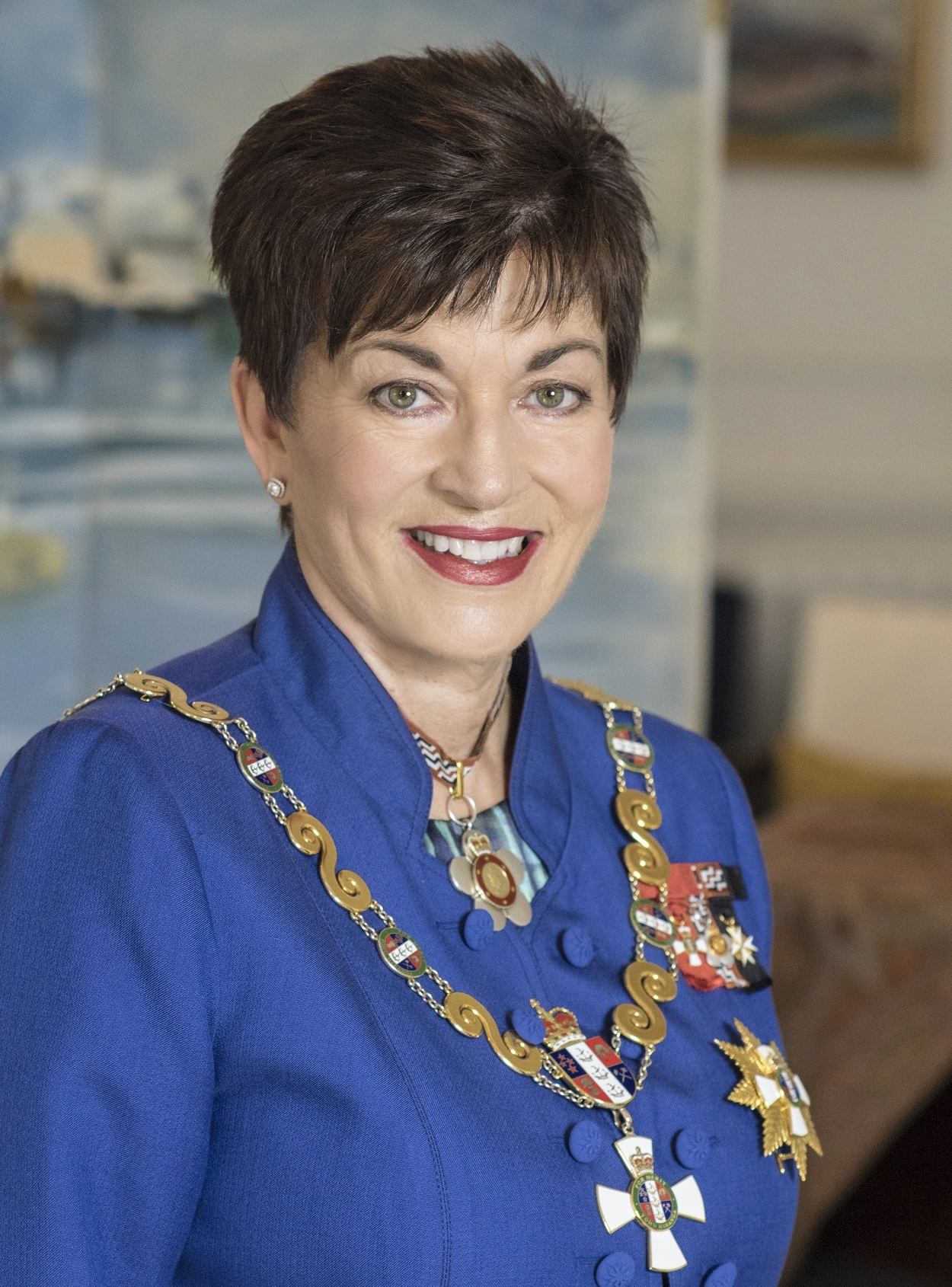
Patsy Reddy

=== Government ===
2017 is the third and final full year of the 51st Parliament, which first sat on 21 October 2014 and was dissolved on 17 August 2017. A general election was held on 23 September to elect the 52nd Parliament.

The Fifth National Government, first elected in 2008, ends. The Sixth Labour Government begins.

- Speaker of the House – David Carter, then Trevor Mallard from 8 November
- Prime Minister – Bill English until 26 October, then Jacinda Ardern
- Deputy Prime Minister – Paula Bennett until 26 October, then Winston Peters
- Leader of the House – Gerry Brownlee until 2 May, then Simon Bridges until 26 October, then Chris Hipkins
- Minister of Finance – Steven Joyce until 26 October, then Grant Robertson
- Minister of Foreign Affairs – Murray McCully until 2 May, then Gerry Brownlee until 26 October, then Winston Peters
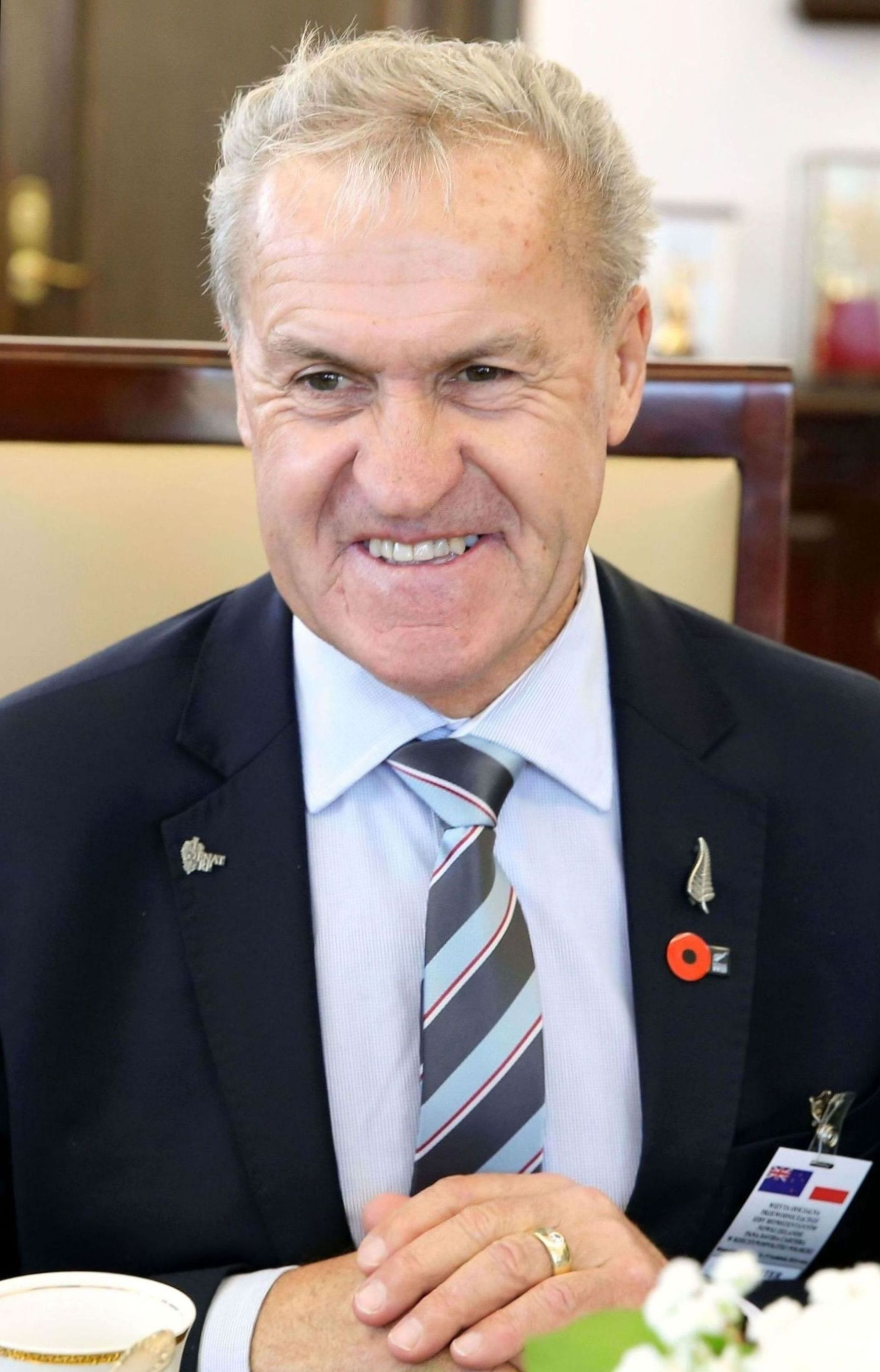
David Carter

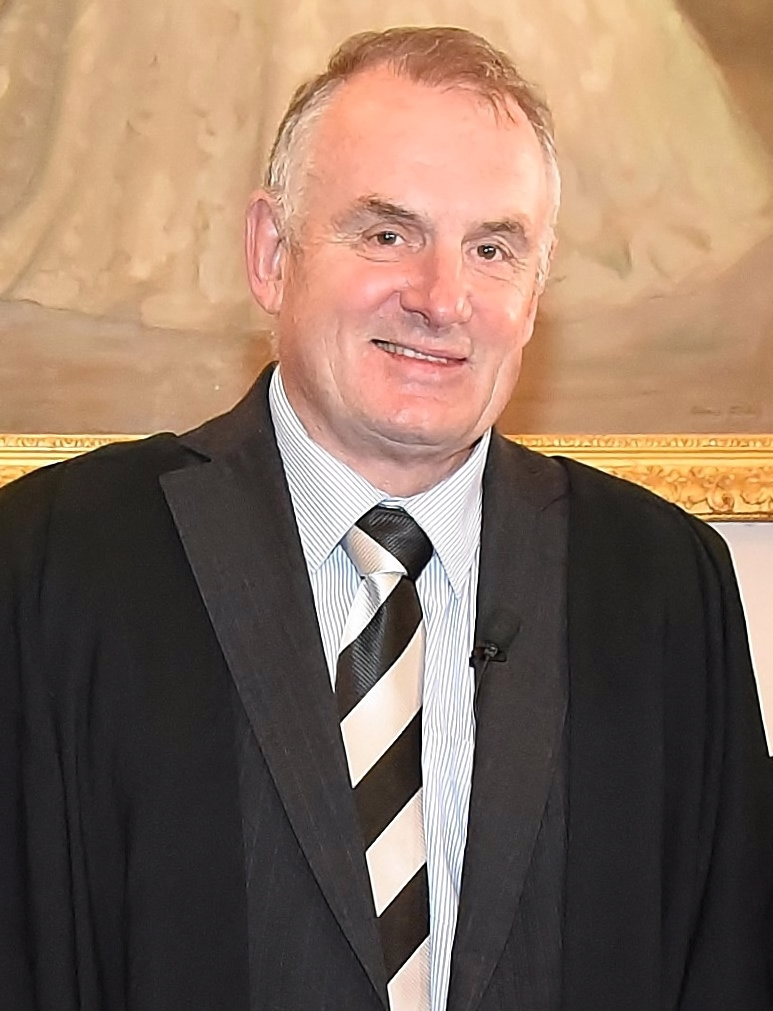
Trevor Mallard

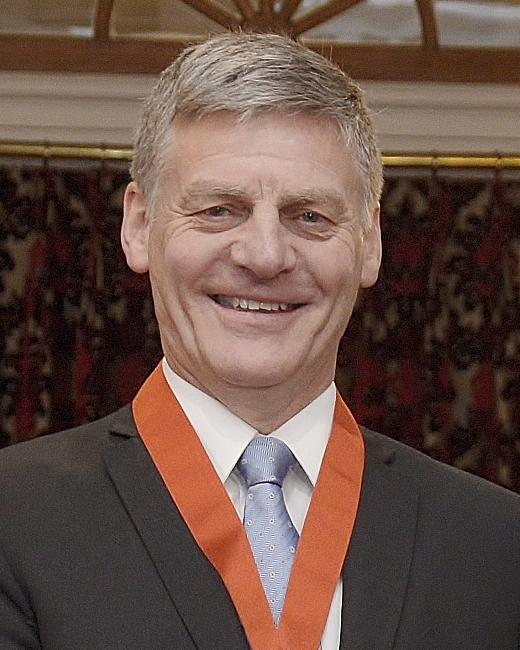
Bill English

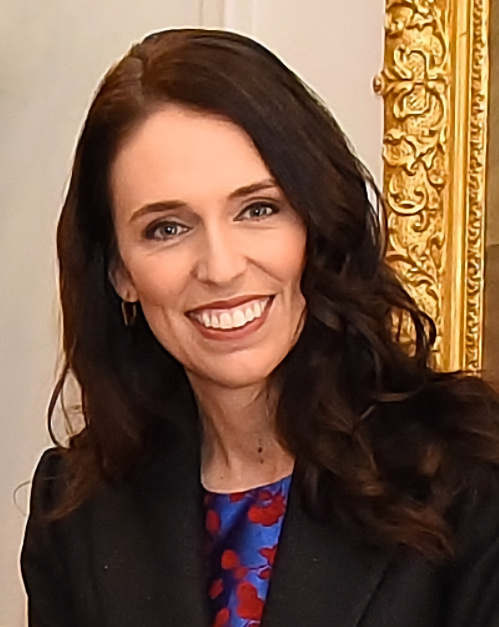
Jacinda Ardern

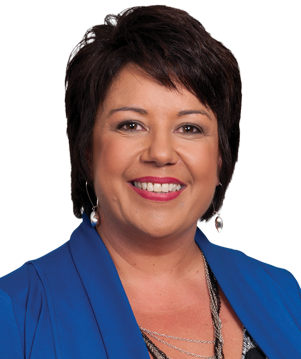
Paula Bennett

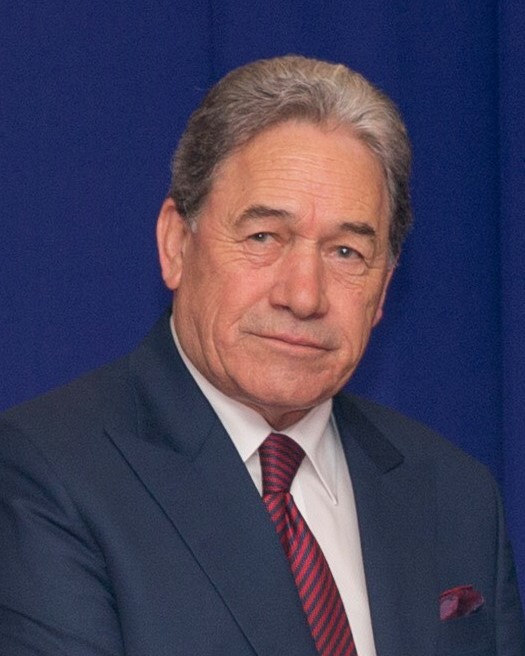
Winston Peters

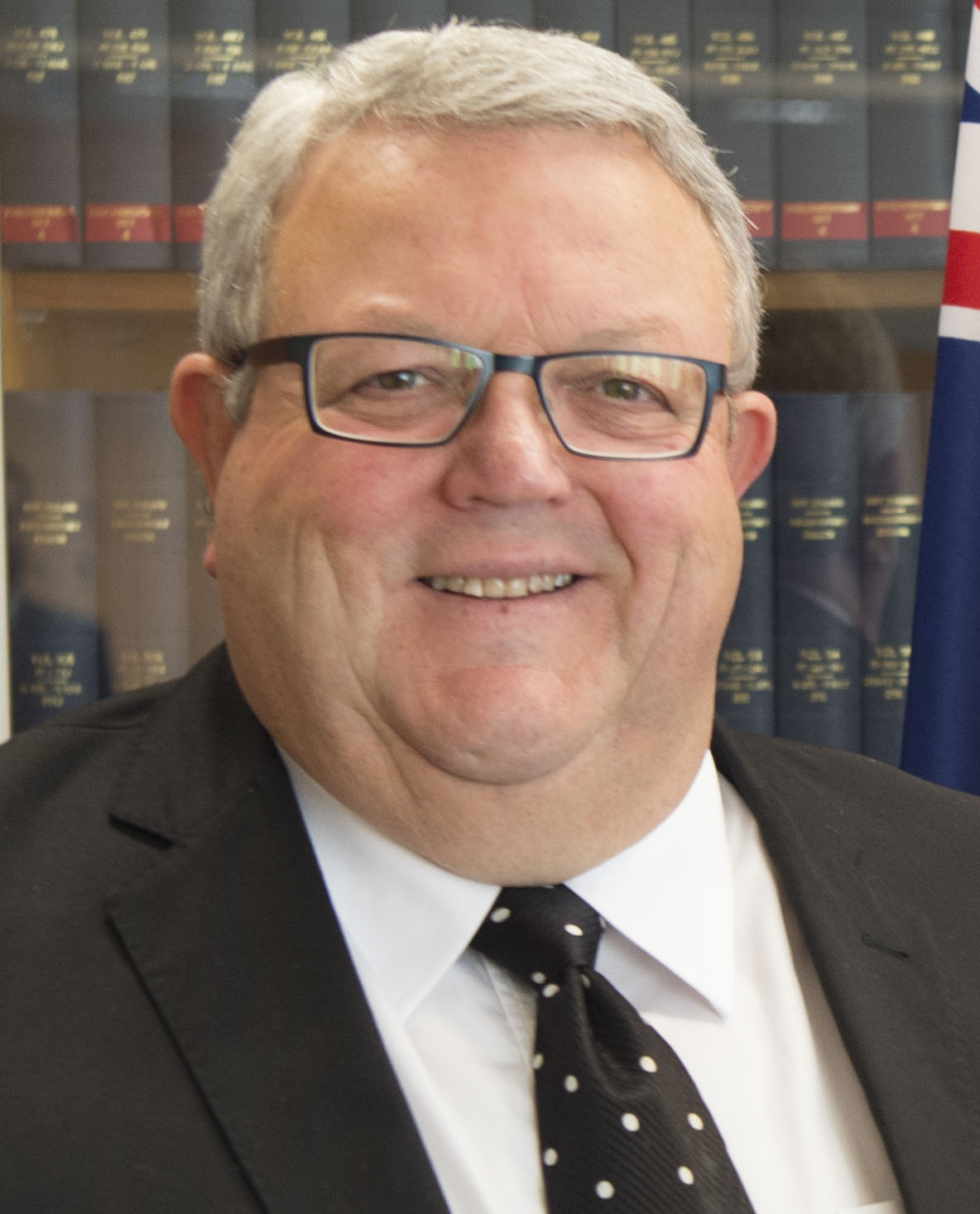
Gerry Brownlee

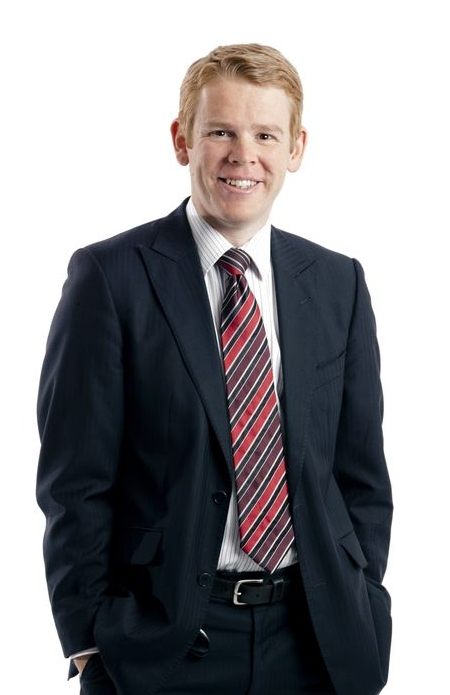
Chris Hipkins

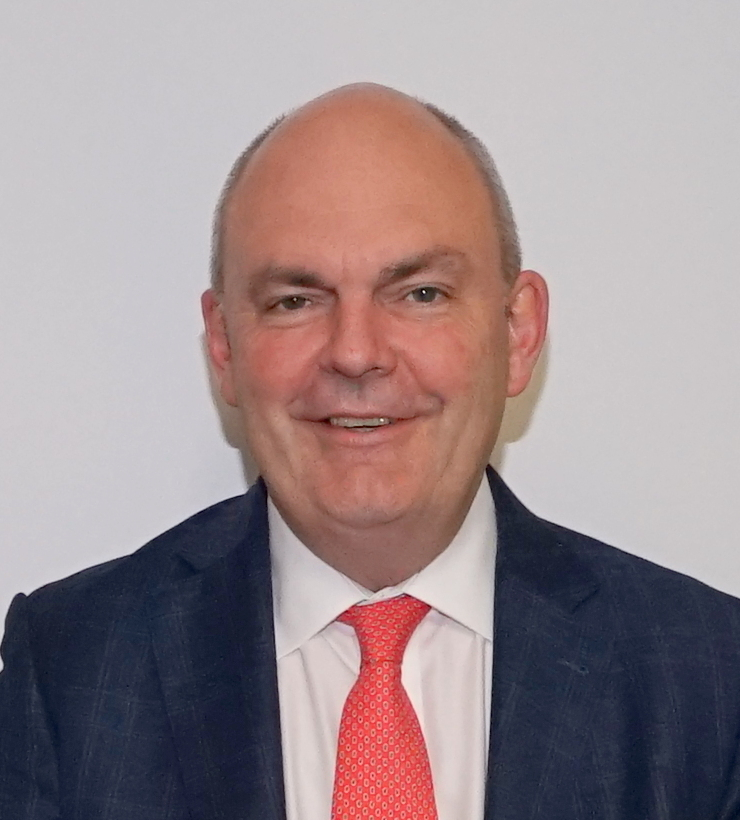
Steven Joyce

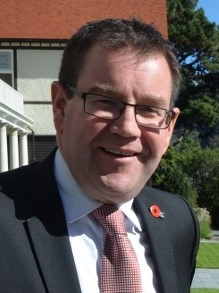
Grant Robertson

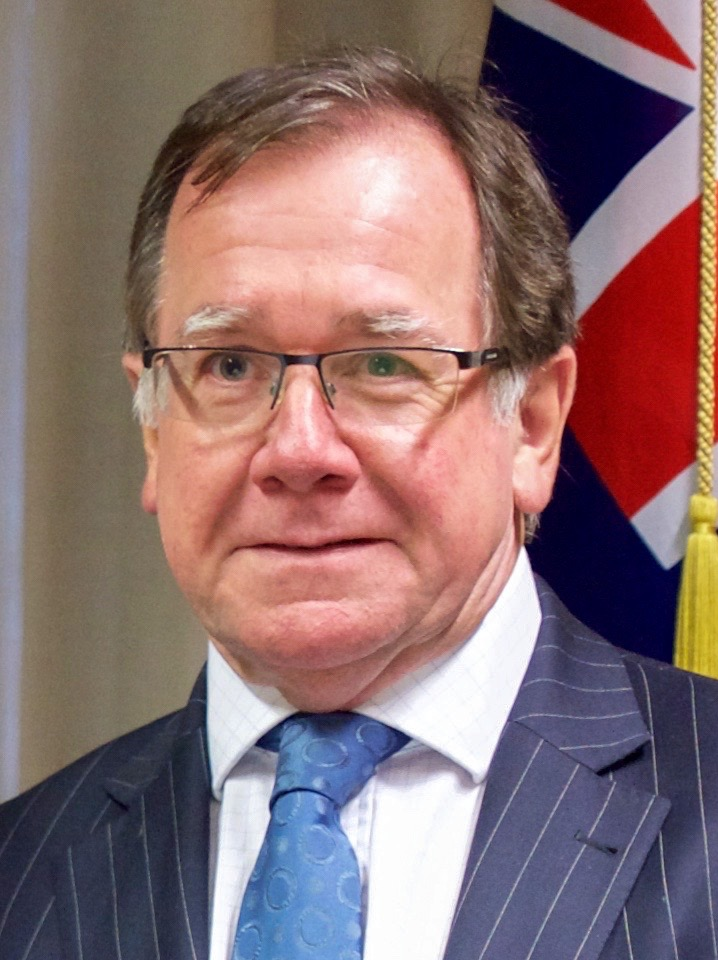
Murray McCully

=== Other party leaders ===
- Labour – Andrew Little until 1 August, then Jacinda Ardern (Leader of the Opposition until 26 October)
- Green – James Shaw and, until 9 August, Metiria Turei
- New Zealand First – Winston Peters
- Māori Party – Te Ururoa Flavell and Marama Fox
- ACT New Zealand – David Seymour
- United Future – Peter Dunne until 23 August, then Damian Light until 14 November (party disbanded)
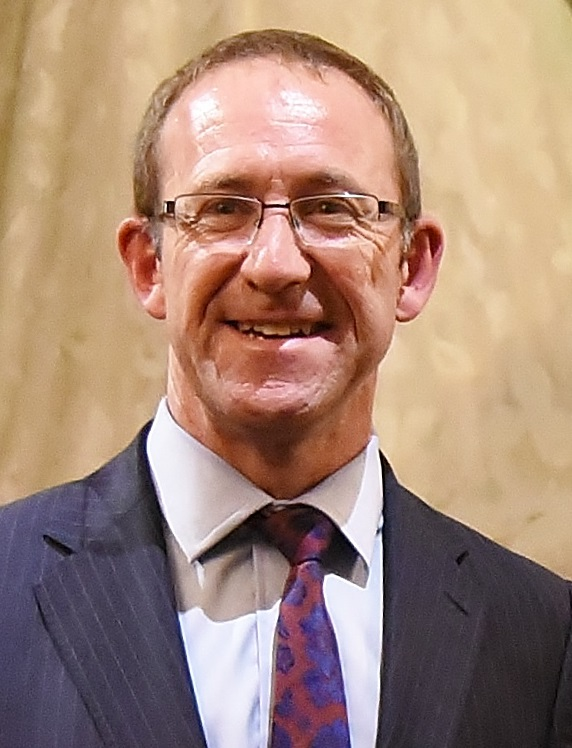
Andrew Little

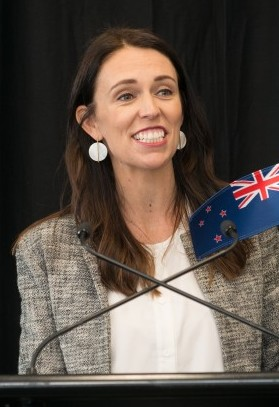
Jacinda Ardern

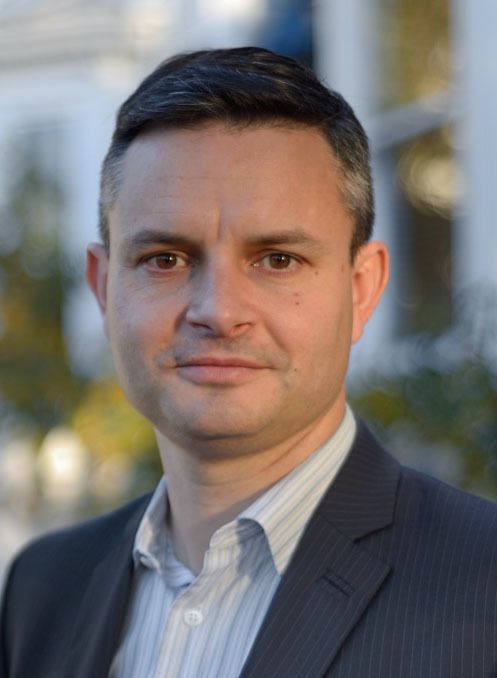
James Shaw

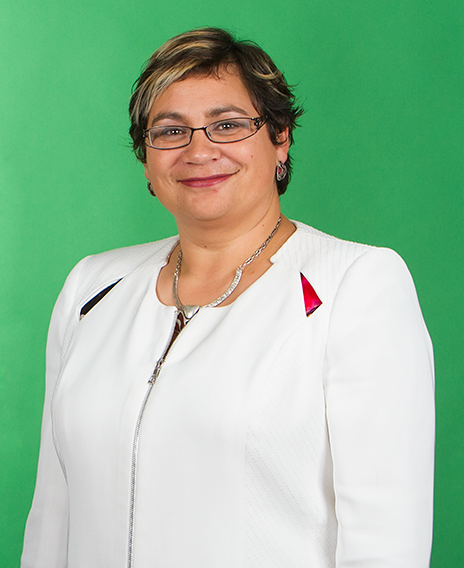
Metiria Turei

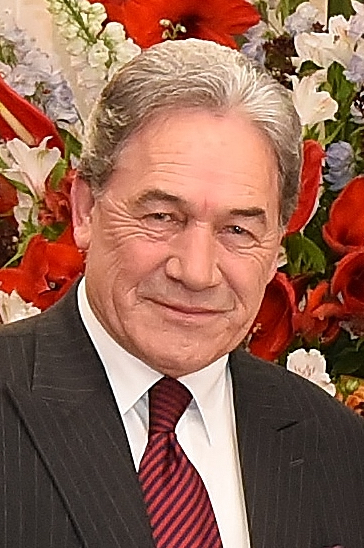
Winston Peters

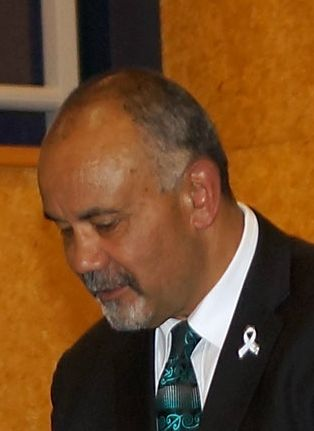
Te Ururoa Flavell

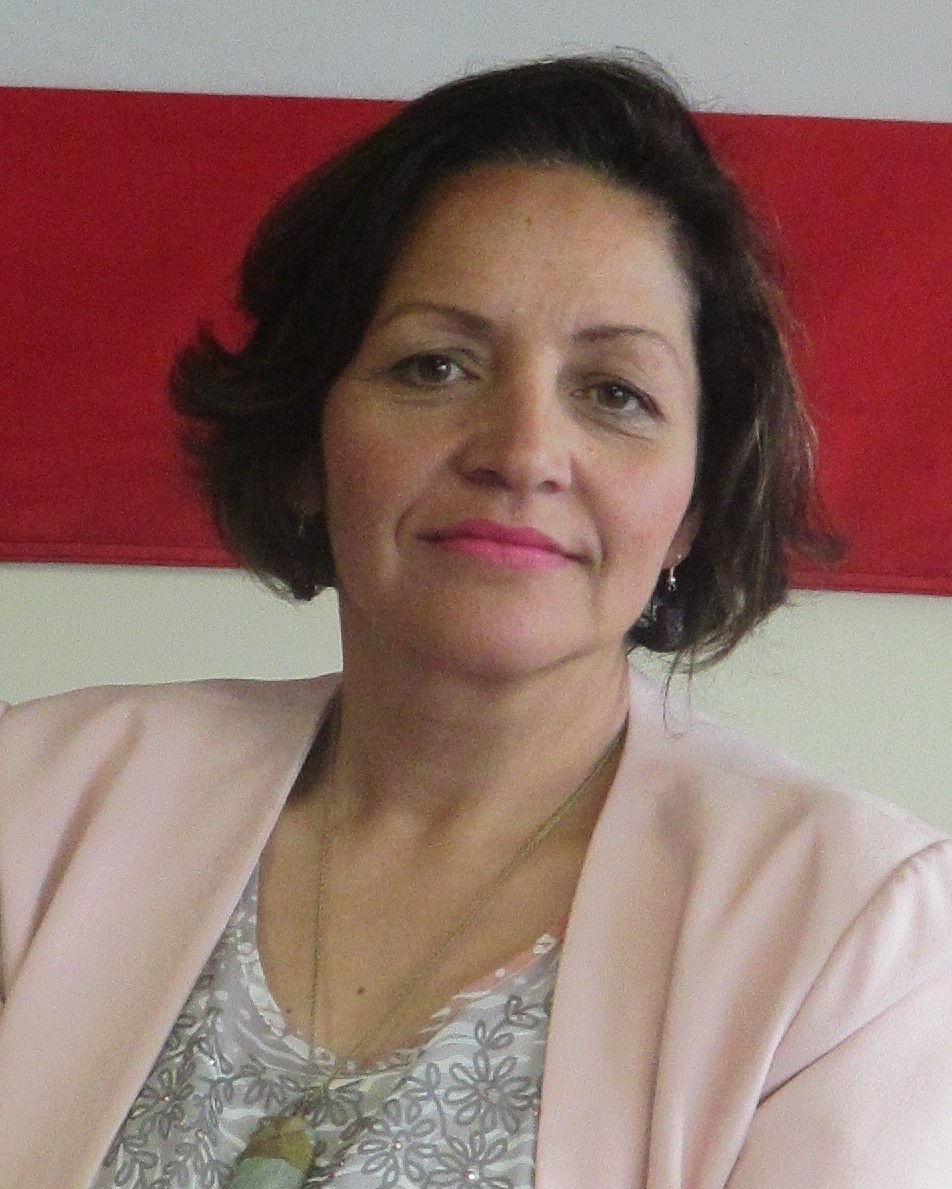
Marama Fox

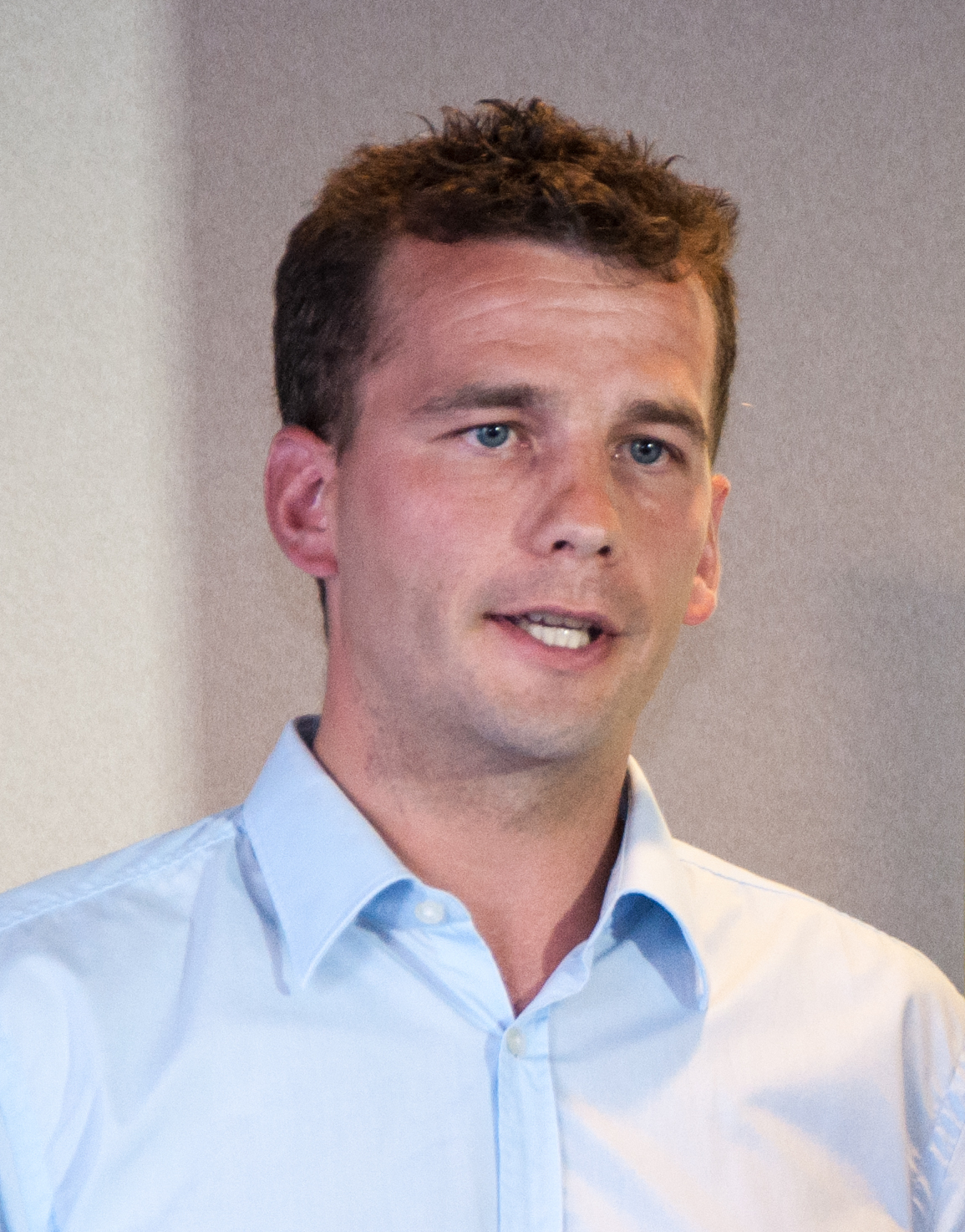
David Seymour

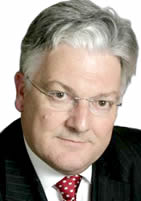
Peter Dunne

=== Judiciary ===
- Chief Justice – Sian Elias
- President of the Court of Appeal – Stephen Kós
- Chief High Court judge – Geoffrey Venning
- Chief District Court judge – Jan-Marie Doogue
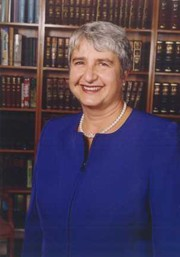
Sian Elias

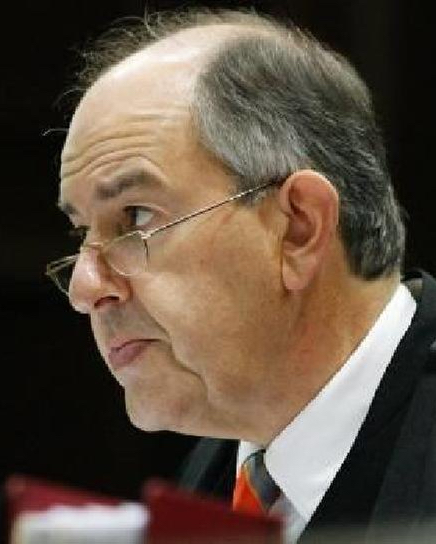
Stephen Kós

=== Main centre leaders ===
- Mayor of Auckland – Phil Goff
- Mayor of Tauranga – Greg Brownless
- Mayor of Hamilton – Andrew King
- Mayor of Wellington – Justin Lester
- Mayor of Christchurch – Lianne Dalziel
- Mayor of Dunedin – Dave Cull
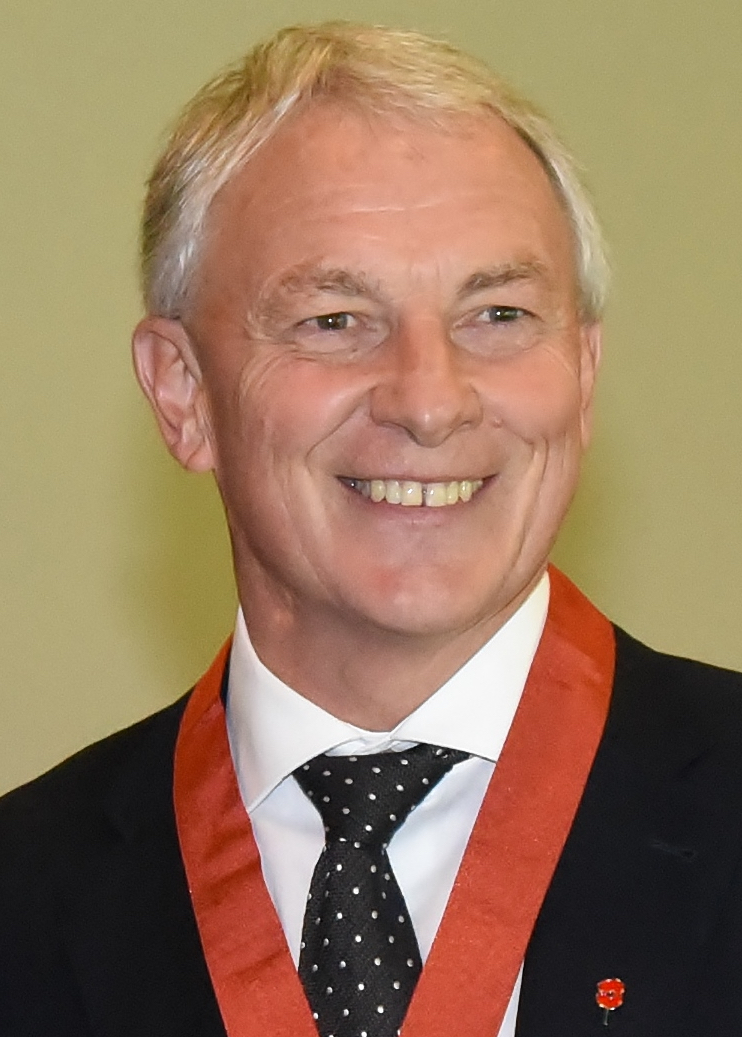
Phil Goff

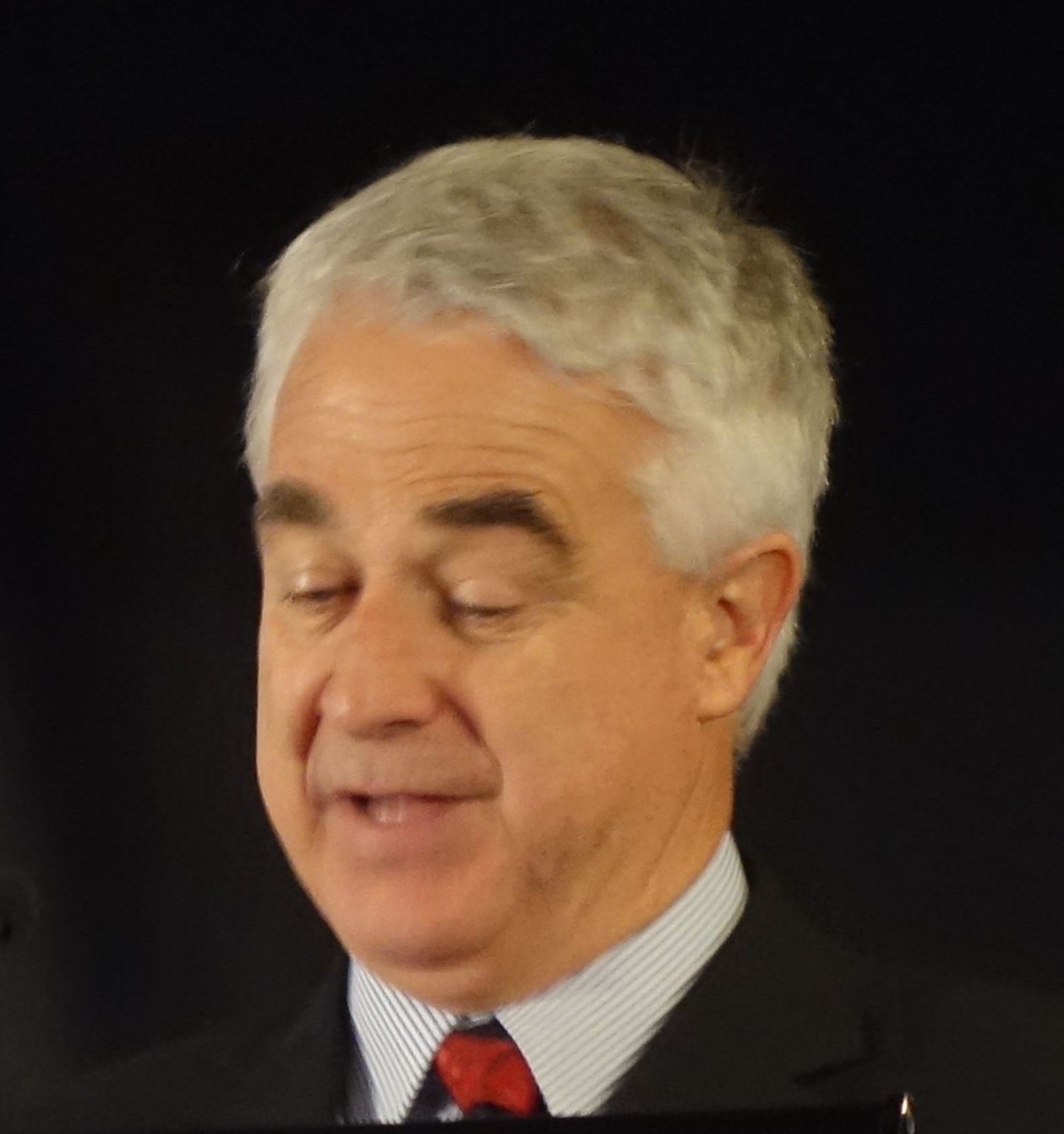
Greg Brownless

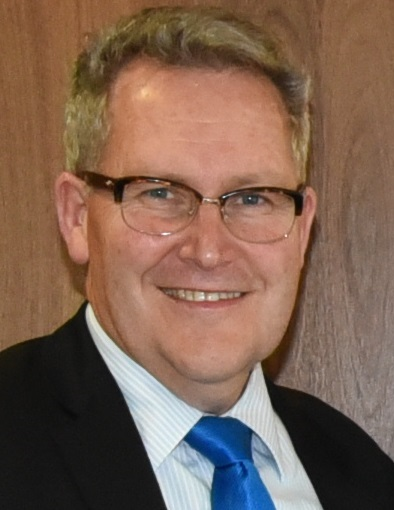
Andrew King

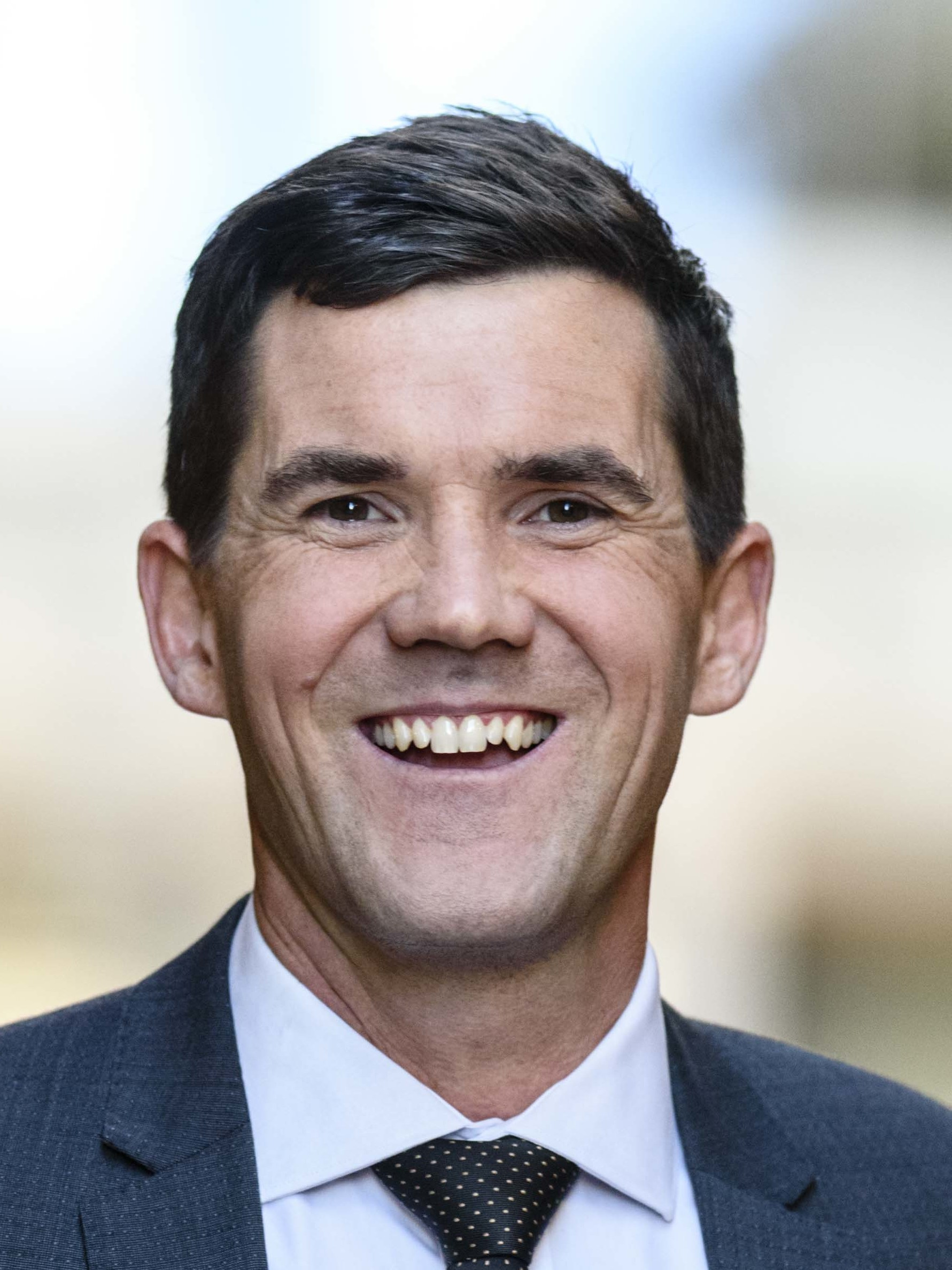
Justin Lester

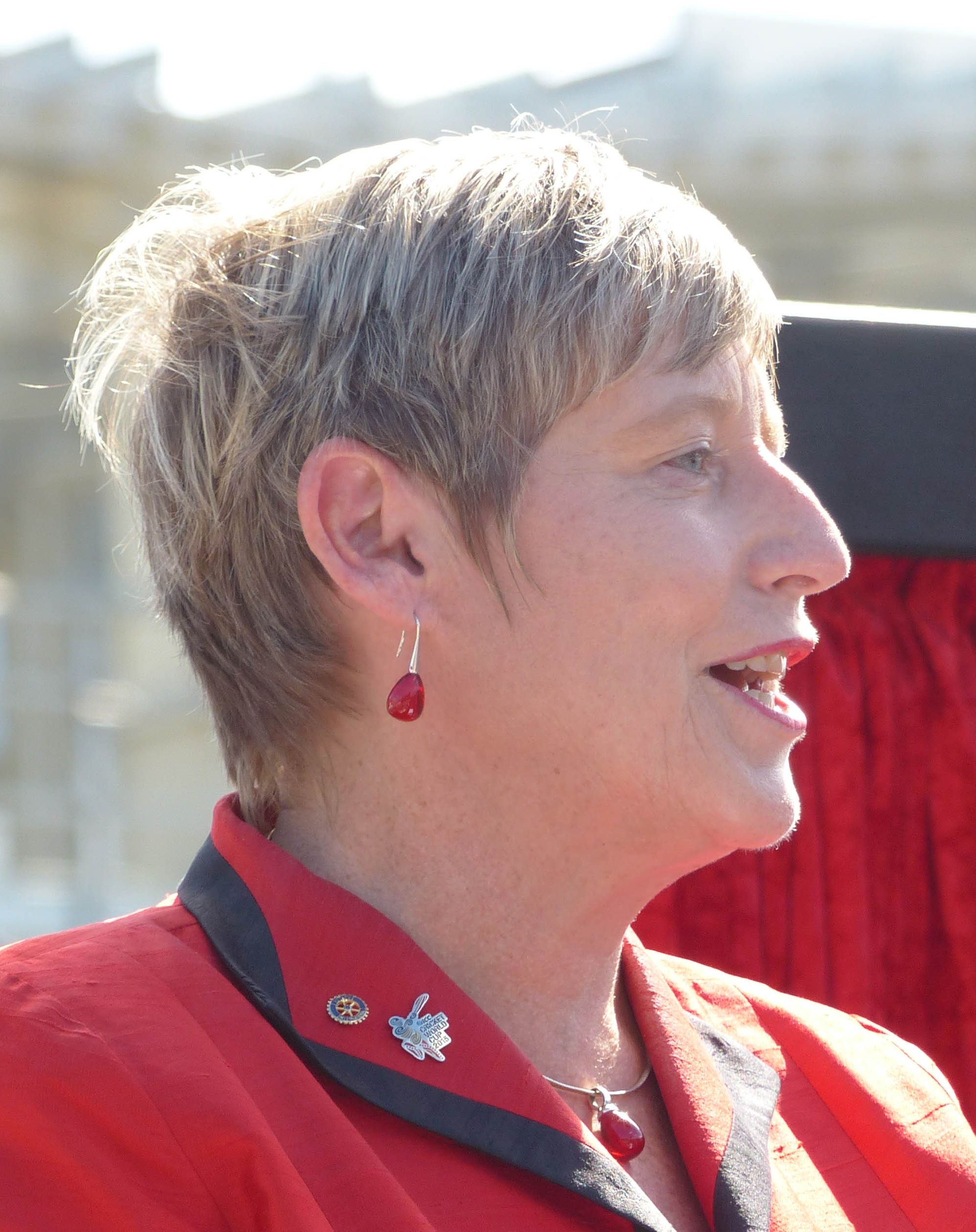
Lianne Dalziell

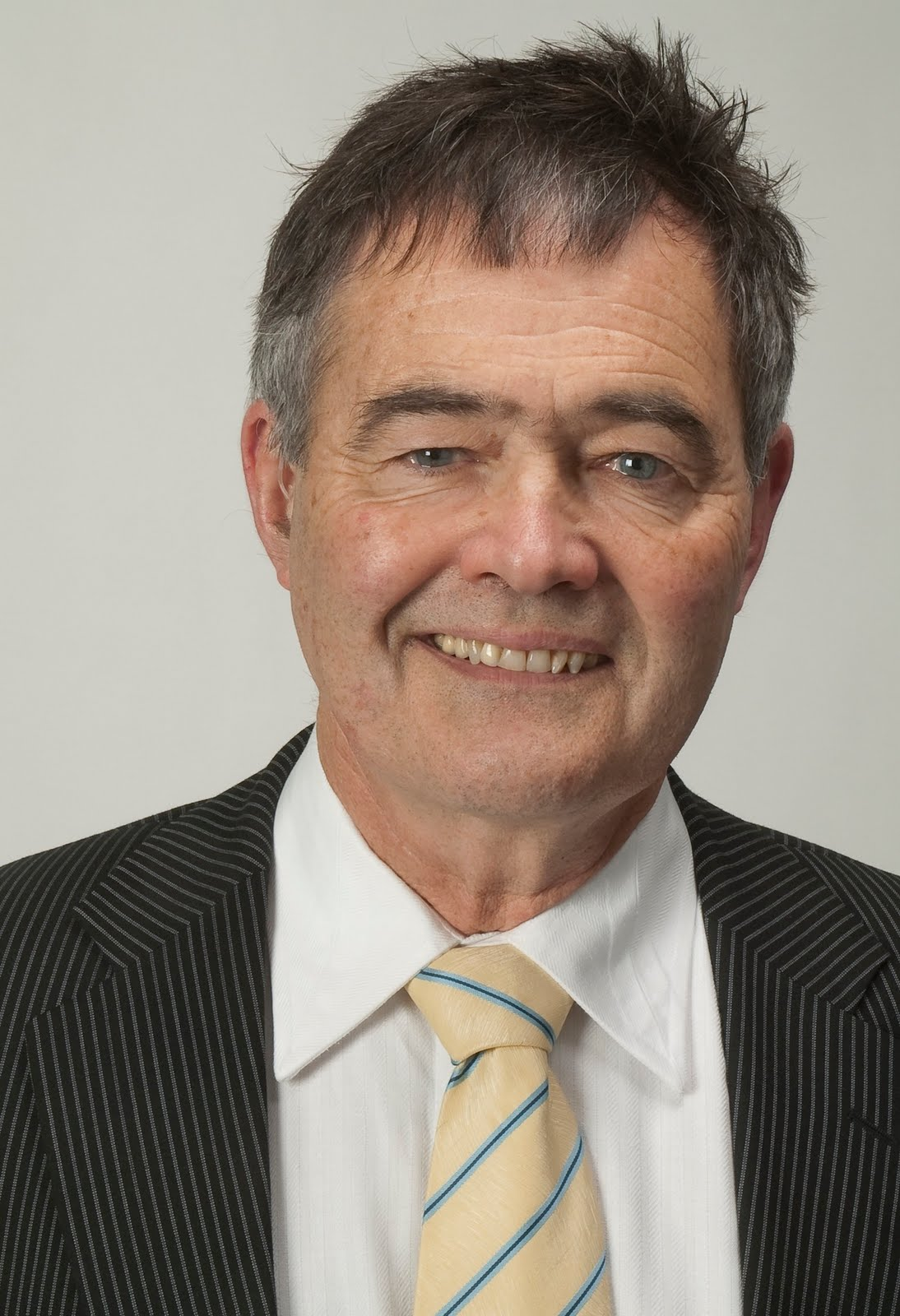
Dave Cull

== Events ==
=== February ===
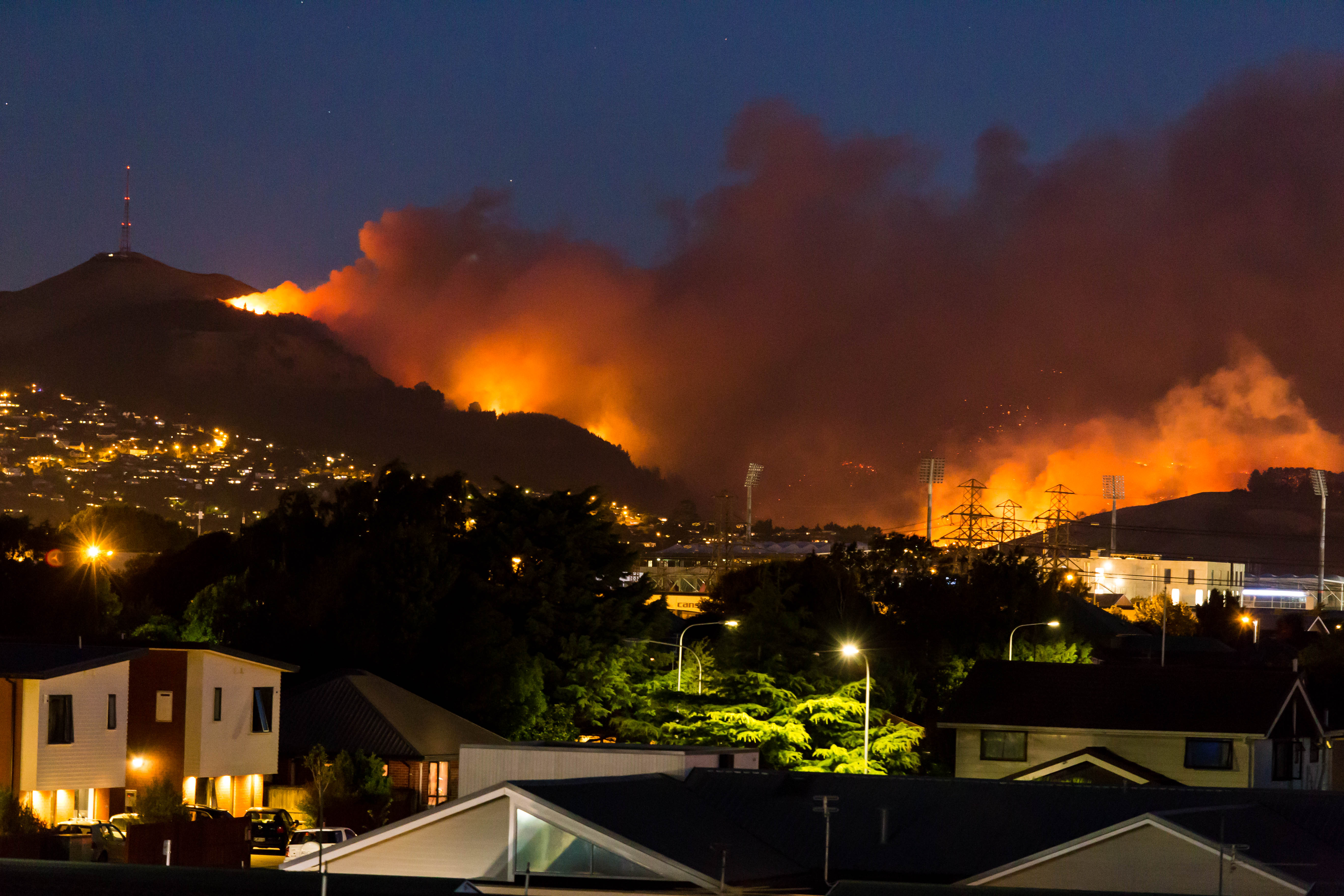
The Port Hills fires on 15 February

- 6 February – Sapphire Jubilee of Elizabeth II's accession as Queen of New Zealand
- 13 February – Fires in Hawke's Bay cause a state of emergency to be declared in Hastings.
- 13 February to 20 April – Wild fires burn on the Port Hills of Christchurch
- 22 February – The Canterbury Earthquake National Memorial opens on the sixth anniversary of the 2011 Christchurch earthquake
- 25 February – Mount Albert by-election takes place

=== March ===
- 7 March – Jacinda Ardern is elected deputy leader of the Labour Party
- March – Pumpkin Patch is put into liquidation

=== April ===
- 4 April – State of emergencies are declares in the Whanganui and Rangitikei districts in anticipation of ex tropical Cyclone Debbie.
- 6 April – A state of emergency is declared as the town of Edgecumbe is evacuated due to flooding caused by the remnants of Cyclone Debbie
- 13–14 April – Cyclone Cook, now an extratropical cyclone, moves across the North Island
- 24 April – Gerry Brownlee resigns from his portfolio of Minister for Supporting Greater Christchurch Regeneration.

=== May ===
- 25 May – The 2017 New Zealand budget is presented to Parliament by the Minister of Finance, Steven Joyce

=== June ===
- 5 June – The 2017 Queen's Birthday Honours are announced

=== July ===
- 19–21 July – Severe flooding hits the east coast of the South Island between Christchurch and Balclutha
- 21 July – Mycoplasma bovis disease is found in a South Island herd of cows

=== August ===
- 1 August – Jacinda Ardern elected leader of the Labour Party after Andrew Little resigns

=== September ===
- 23 September – The 2017 general election is held

=== October ===
- 26 October – Jacinda Ardern is sworn in as the 40th Prime Minister of New Zealand
- 31 October – Trolleybuses are withdrawn from service in Wellington

=== November ===
- 9 November – The New Zealand Police and Facebook launch an online Amber alert system to notify the public of missing children.

=== December ===
- 4 December – The Healthy Homes Guarantee Act 2017 receives royal assent, having passed its third reading in Parliament on 29 November
- 30 December – The 2018 New Year Honours are announced

== Sport ==
=== Rugby union ===
- 2017 British & Irish Lions tour to New Zealand, 3 June – 8 July

=== Shooting ===
- Ballinger Belt –
  - Jim Bailey (Australia)
  - Brian Carter (Te Puke), third, top New Zealander

== Births ==
- 9 November – Johnny Get Angry, Thoroughbred racehorse
- 20 November – Mo'unga, Thoroughbred racehorse

== Deaths ==
=== January ===
- 7 January
  - Nick Calavrias, businessman (Steel & Tube) (born 1949).
  - Sir Bruce Slane, lawyer and public servant, chair of the Broadcasting Tribunal (1977–1990), president of the New Zealand Law Society (1982–1985), Privacy Commissioner (1992–2003) (born 1931).
- 8 January – Elspeth Kennedy, Hall of Fame sharebroker, community leader (born 1931).
- 9 January
  - Michael Chamberlain, pastor, exonerated in the death of Azaria Chamberlain (born 1944).
  - Joe Harawira, environmental campaigner against PCP poisoning (born 1946).
  - Brown Turei, Anglican prelate, Pīhopa o Tairāwhiti (since 1992), Pīhopa o Aotearoa (since 2005), Primate of New Zealand (since 2005) (born 1924).
- 10 January – Heather McPherson, feminist poet, editor and publisher, co-founder of Spiral (1975) (born 1942).
- 11 January – Newman Hoar, cricketer (Wairarapa, Wellington, Nelson) (born 1920).
- 23 January – Pat Downey, lawyer and public servant, chair of Radio New Zealand (1974–1976), Chief Human Rights Commissioner (1977–1983), general editor of The Laws of New Zealand (1991–1995) (born 1927).
- 24 January – Manu Maniapoto, rugby union player (Bay of Plenty, New Zealand Māori) (born 1935).
- 26 January – Dame Laurie Salas, women's rights and peace activist, secretary (1976–1980) and vice president (1982–1986) of the National Council of Women (born 1922).
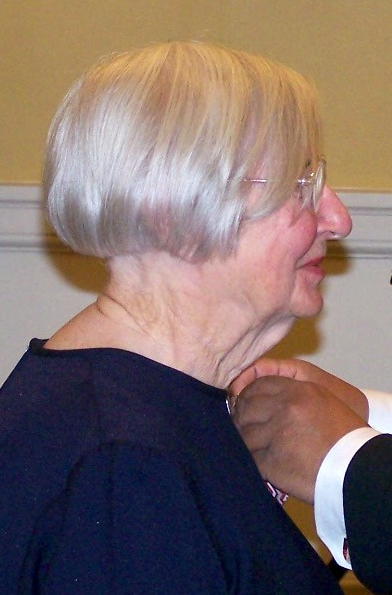
Elspeth Kennedy

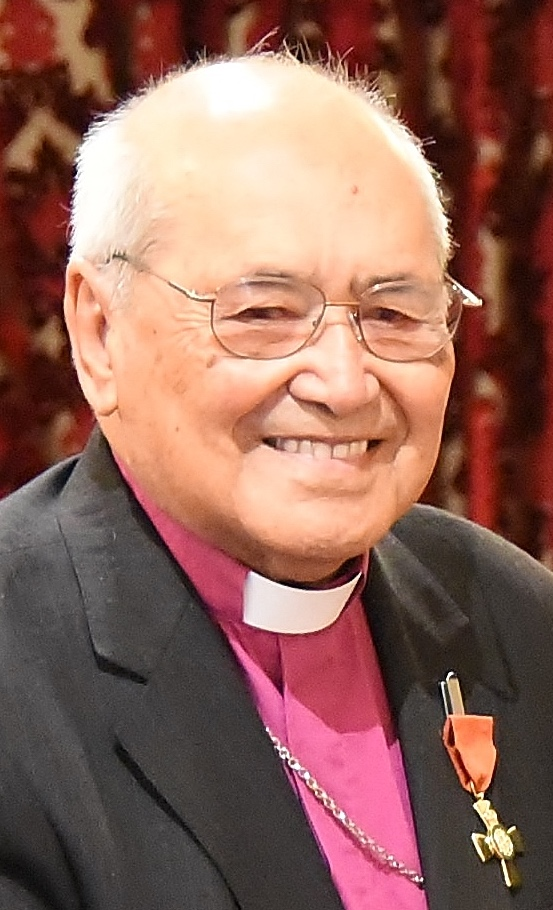
Brown Turei

=== February ===
- 1 February – Bernie Portenski, athlete (born 1949)
- 4 February – John Dickson, poet (born 1944)
- 8 February – Steve Sumner, association footballer (born 1955)
- 12 February – Sione Lauaki, rugby union player (born 1981)
- 13 February – Jim Watson, biotechnologist and entrepreneur (born 1943)
- 14 February – John Watkinson, soil chemist (born 1932)
- 19 February – Halaevalu Mataʻaho ʻAhomeʻe, Tongan royal (born 1926)
- 27 February – Lyn Barnett, singer (born 1945) (body discovered on this date)
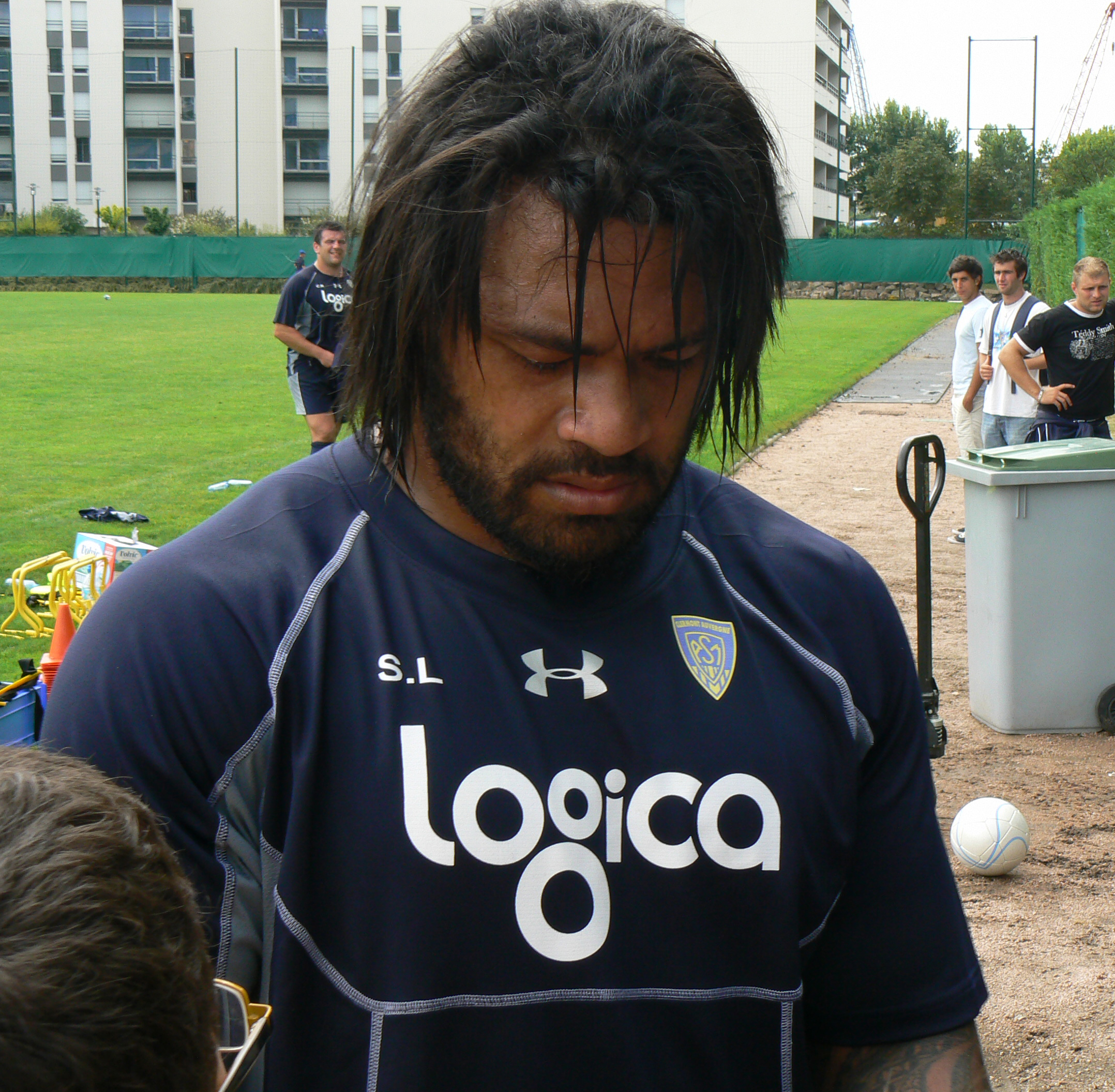
Sione Lauaki

=== March ===
- 1 March – Tania Dalton, netball player (born 1971)
- 3 March – Bramwell Cook, gastroenterologist (born 1936)
- 6 March – Dudley Storey, rower (born 1939)
- 12 March
  - Murray Ball, cartoonist (born 1939)
  - Eunice Eichler, midwife, open adoption advocate (born 1932)
- 15 March – Phil Garland, folk musician (born 1942)
- 23 March – Nigel Hutchinson, film producer and commercial director (born 1941)
- 24 March – Roger Bradley, cricketer (born 1962)
- 25 March – Eric Watson, rugby union player and coach, cricketer (born 1925)
- 27 March
  - Shirley Annan, netball player (born 1940)
  - Sean Roberts, cricket (born 1968)
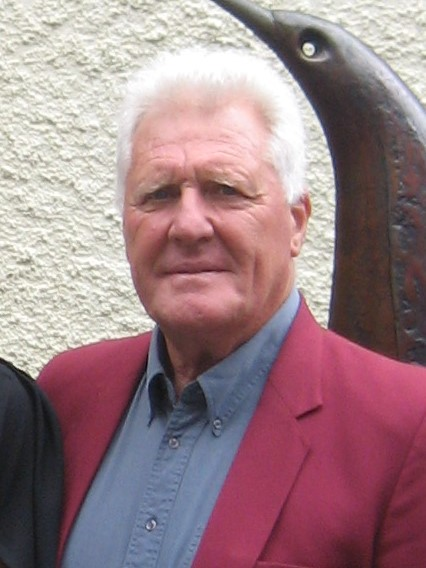
Dudley Storey

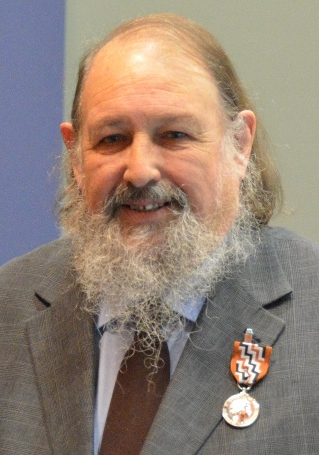
Phil Garland

=== April ===
- 3 April
  - Tomairangi Paki, Tainui kuia, kapa haka exponent (born c.1953)
  - Bruce Palmer, lawyer, judge (born 1935)
  - Bill Tinnock, rower (born 1930)
- 6 April – John Anslow, field hockey player (born 1935)
- 7 April – Robin Kay, artist, historian (born 1919)
- 8 April – Sir Douglas Myers, businessman (born 1938)
- 9 April – John Clarke, satirist (born 1948)
- 18 April – Digby Taylor, sailor (born 1941)
- 19 April – Jill Amos, politician, activist (born 1927)
- 20 April
  - David Dougherty, wrongly convicted of rape and abduction (born 1967)
  - Sandy McNicol, rugby union player (born 1944)
- 27 April
  - Danny O'Connor, lawn bowls player
  - Alexia Pickering, disabilities rights campaigner (born 1930)
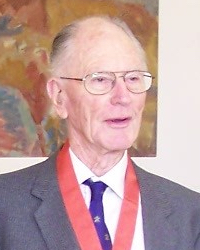
Robin Kay

=== May ===
- 2 May – Hugo Judd, diplomat (born 1939)
- 3 May – Doug Rollerson, rugby union and rugby league player (born 1953)
- 4 May
  - Rosie Scott, author (born 1948)
  - Beryl Te Wiata, actor, author, scriptwriter (born 1925)
- 6 May – Lyn McLean, lawn bowls player (born c. 1945)
- 13 May – Nicholas Tarling, historian, academic, author (born 1931)
- 15 May – Graeme Barrow, author (born 1936)
- 17 May – Kevin Stanton, musician (born c.1956)
- 18 May – George Martin, rugby league player, field athlete (born 1931)
- 25 May – Earl Hagaman, hotel operator (born 1925)
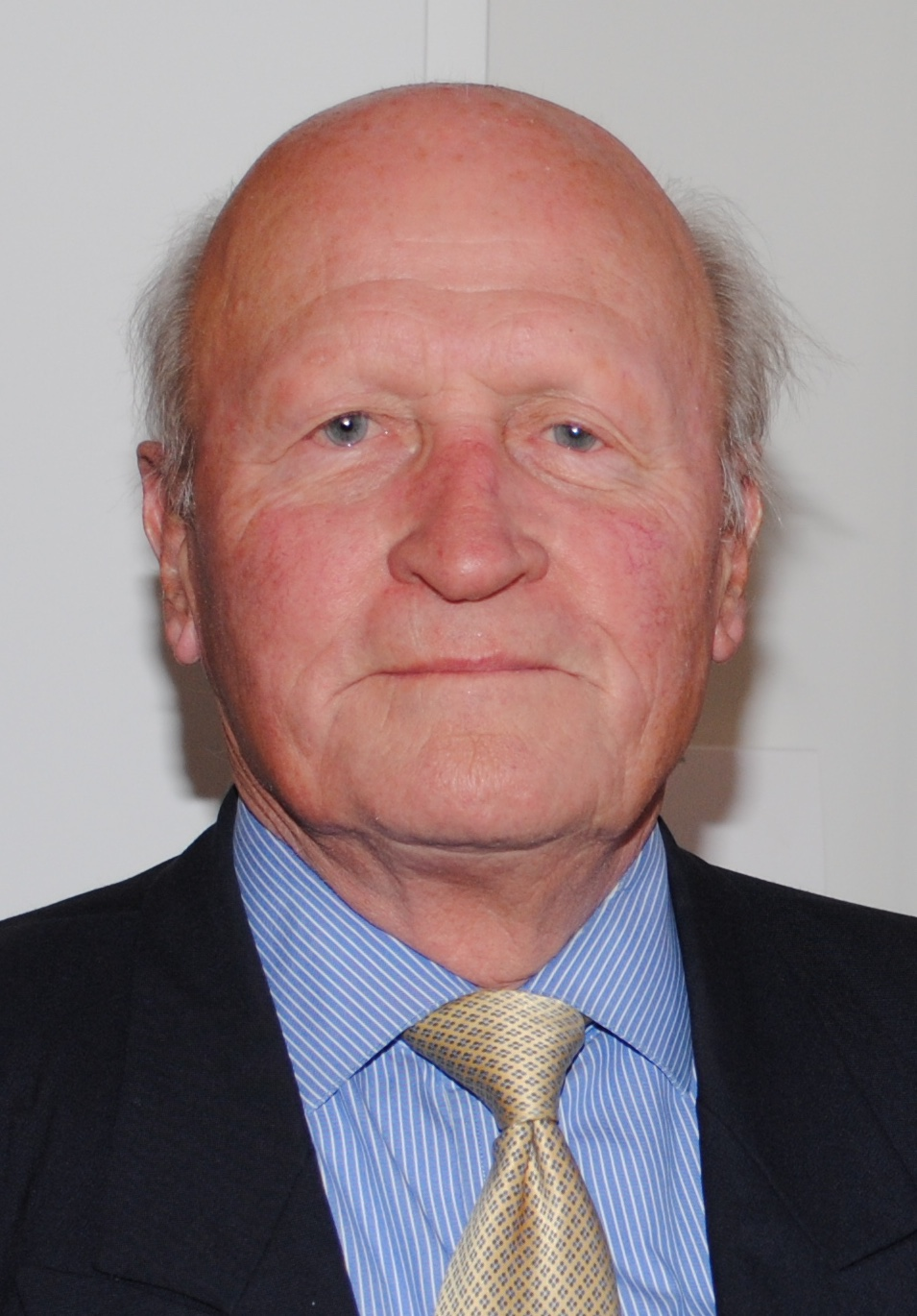
Hugo Judd

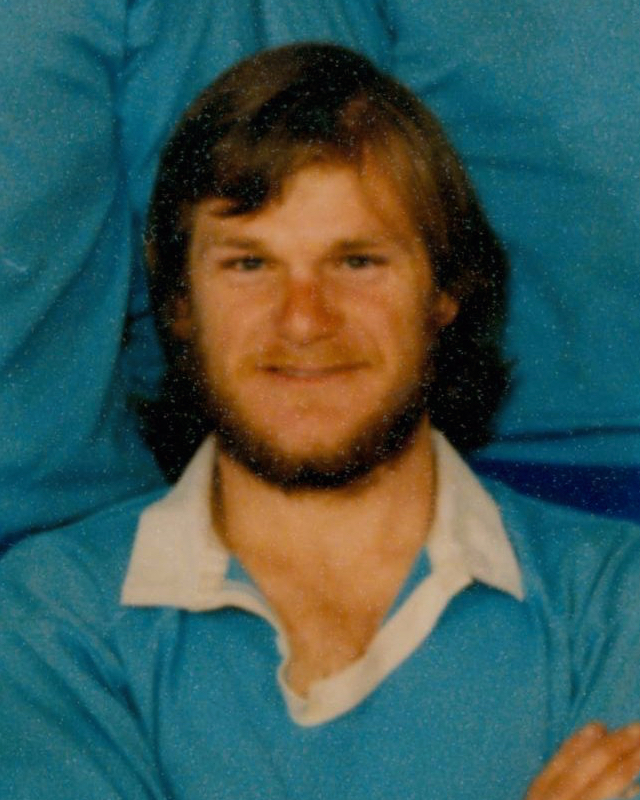
Doug Rollerson

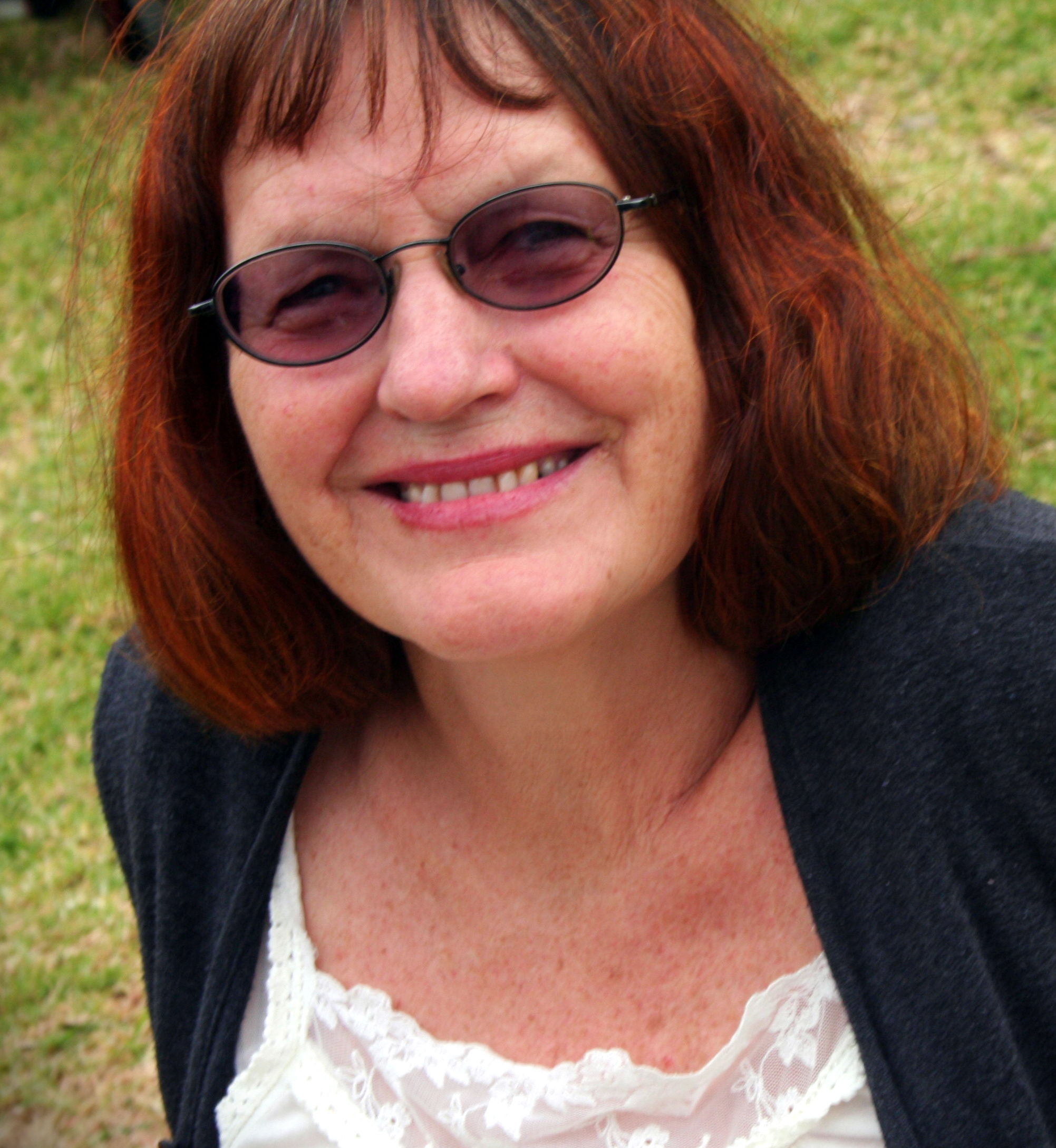
Rosie Scott

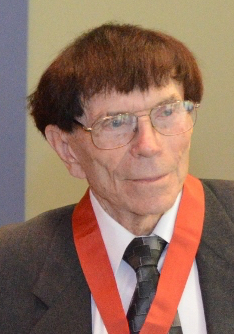
Earl Hagaman

=== June ===
- 11 June – Lois McIvor, artist (born 1930)
- 15 June – Dame Ngāneko Minhinnick, Ngāti Te Ata leader (born 1939)
- 21 June – Oliver Jessel, businessman (born 1929)
- 24 June – Nick Kirk, Anglican cleric (born c.1958)
- 25 June – David Goldsmith, field hockey player (born 1931)
- 26 June
  - Sir Duncan McMullin, jurist (born 1927)
  - Guy Ngan, artist (born 1926)
- 27 June – Jacinta Gray, cyclist (born 1974)
- 28 June – Bruce Stewart, author, playwright, marae founder (born 1936)
- 29 June – Marrion Roe, Olympic swimmer (born 1935)
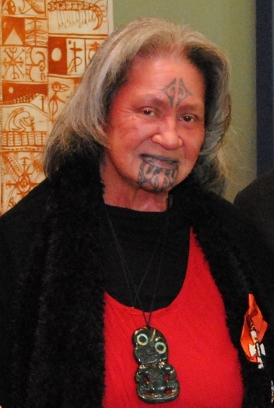
Ngāneko Minhinnick

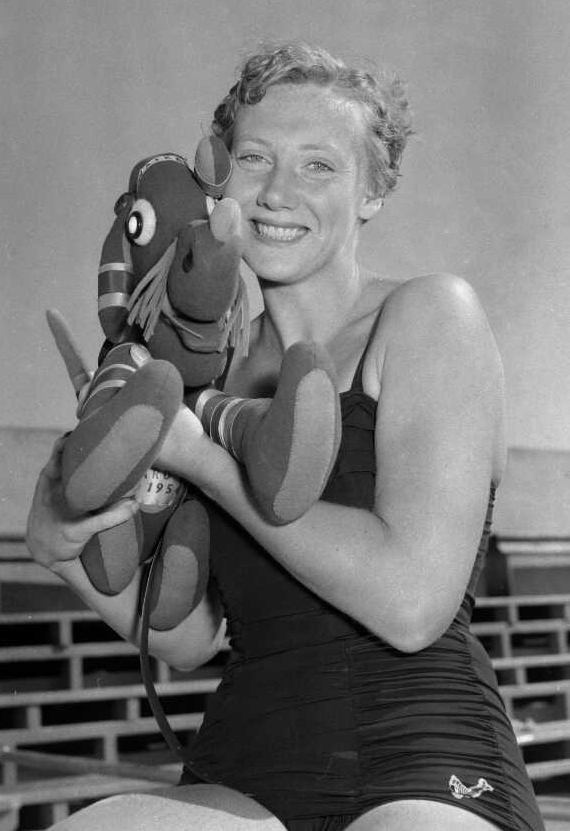
Marrion Roe

=== July ===
- 3 July – Rolf Prince, chemical engineering academic (born 1928)
- 5 July
  - Chris de Freitas, climatologist (born 1948)
  - John Karlsen, actor (born 1919)
- 7 July – Frank Ryan, local-body politician (born 1932)
- 8 July – Gay Eaton, textile artist (born 1933)
- 10 July – Marama Martin, radio and television personality (born 1930)
- 12 July – Allan Hunter, rugby union player, teacher, historian (born 1922)
- 15 July – Michael Cooper, economist (born 1938)
- 16 July – Cliff Whiting, artist, master carver, heritage advocate (born 1936)
- 17 July – George Hill, agronomist (born 1938)
- 18 July – Ian Mason, cricketer (born 1942)
- 23 July
  - Wenceslaus Anthony, businessman (born 1957)
  - Tom Lister, rugby union player (born 1943)
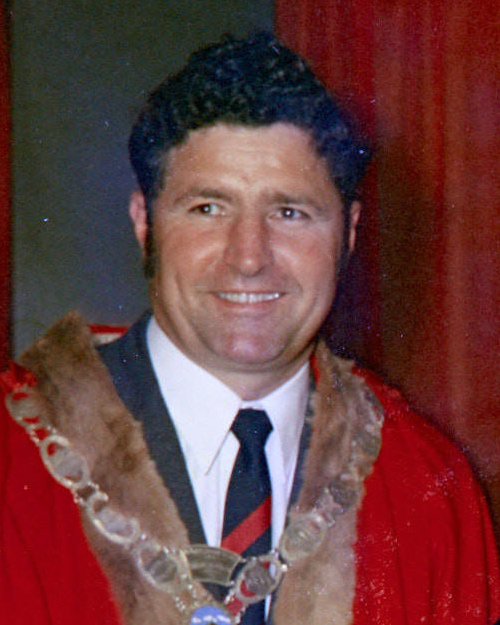
Frank Ryan

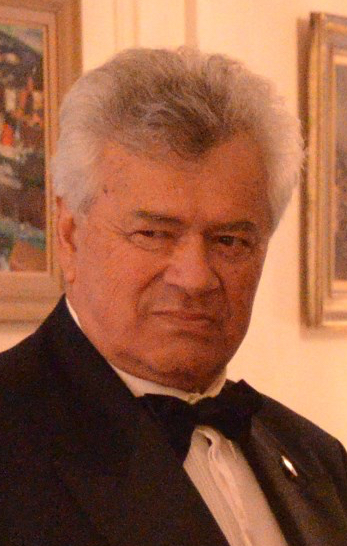
Cliff Whiting

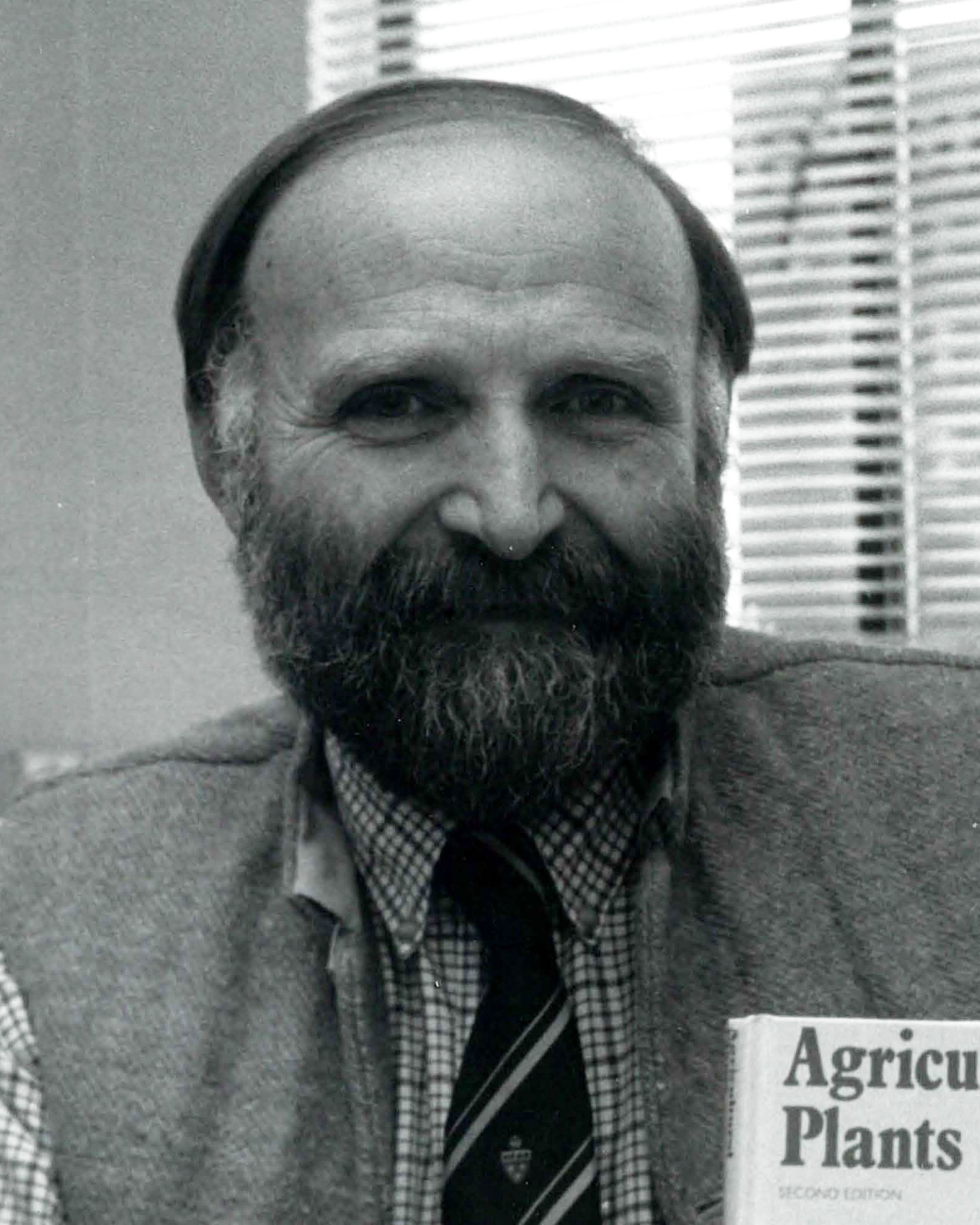
George Hill

=== August ===
- 2 August
  - Sir John Graham, rugby union player and administrator, educator (born 1935)
  - Paul Renton, rugby union player, farmer (born 1962)
- 4 August – Trevor Martin, cricket umpire (born 1925)
- 6 August – Tim Homer, radio personality (born c.1973)
- 10 August
  - Dorothy Fletcher, historian (born 1927)
  - Sheila Natusch, naturalist, writer, illustrator (born 1926)
- 14 August – J. S. Parker, painter (born 1944)
- 15 August – Tui Flower, food writer (born 1925)
- 19 August – Alan Sayers, athlete, journalist, writer (born 1915)
- 20 August – Sir Colin Meads, rugby union player, coach and manager (born 1936)
- 22 August – Tom Pritchard, cricketer (born 1917)
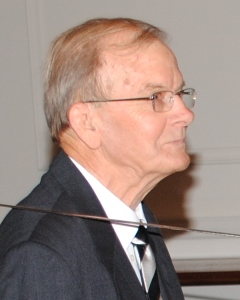
John Graham

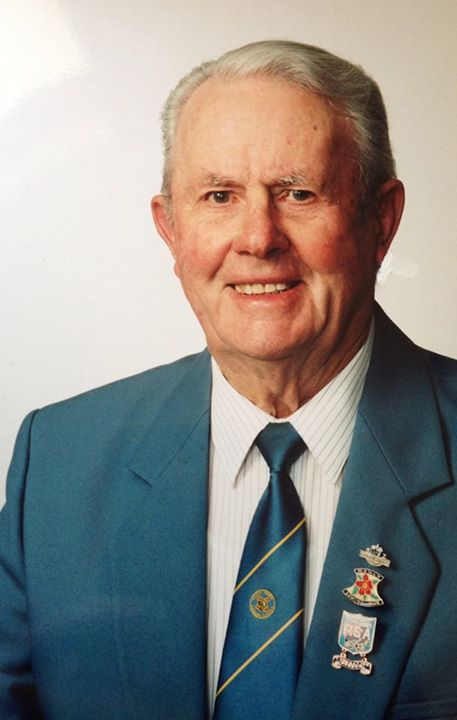
Alan Sayers

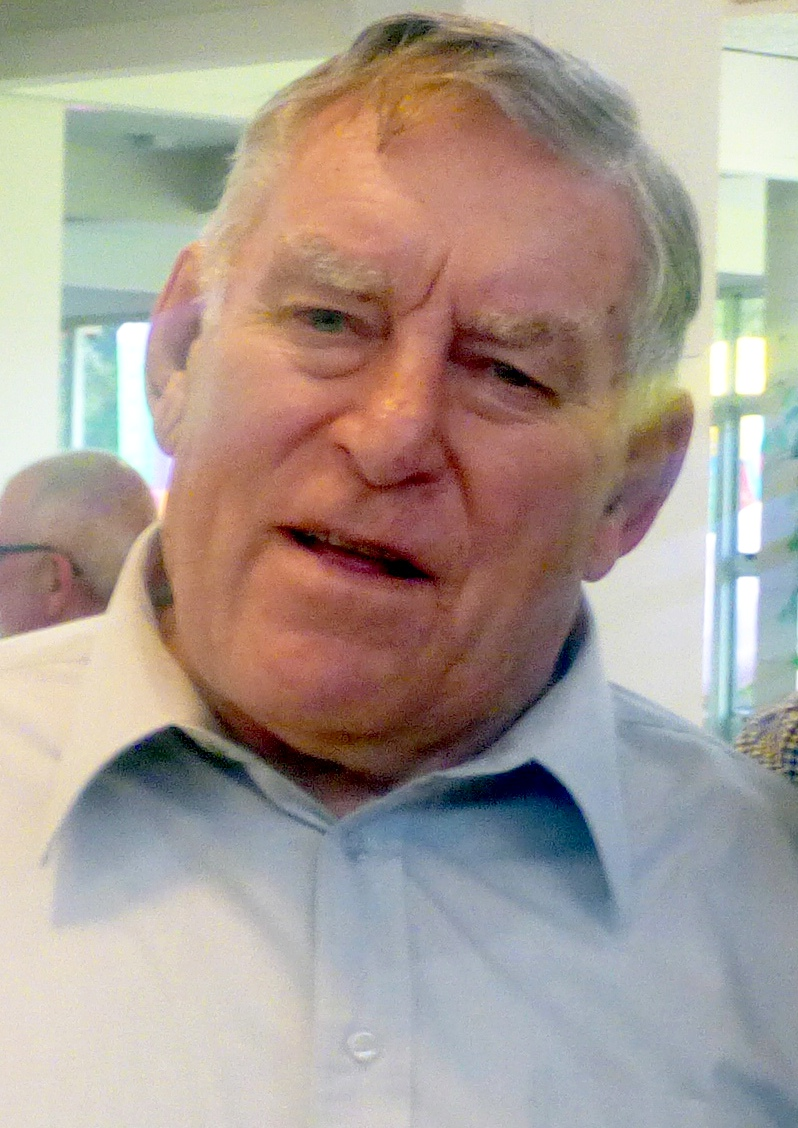
Colin Meads

=== September ===
- 5 September – Cedric Hassall, chemist, academic (born 1919)
- 9 September – Sir Pat Goodman, businessman, philanthropist (born 1929)
- 11 September – Malcolm Templeton, diplomat (born 1924)
- 15 September – Alma Evans-Freke, television presenter (born 1931)
- 16 September – Andrew Leachman, master mariner (born 1945)
- 18 September – Tony Laffey, association footballer (born 1925)
- 19 September – John Nicholson, motor racing driver and engine builder (born 1941)
- 21 September
  - David Beatson, journalist, broadcaster (born 1944)
  - Vera Burt, cricketer, hockey player, coach and administrator (born 1927)
- 26 September – Wanda Cowley, children's writer (born 1924)
- 29 September
  - Annette Johnson, alpine skier (born 1928)
  - Ian Smith, rugby union player (born 1941)
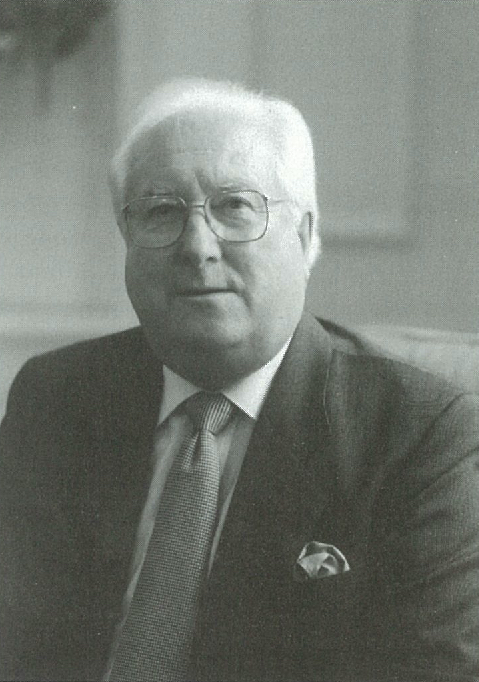
Pat Goodman

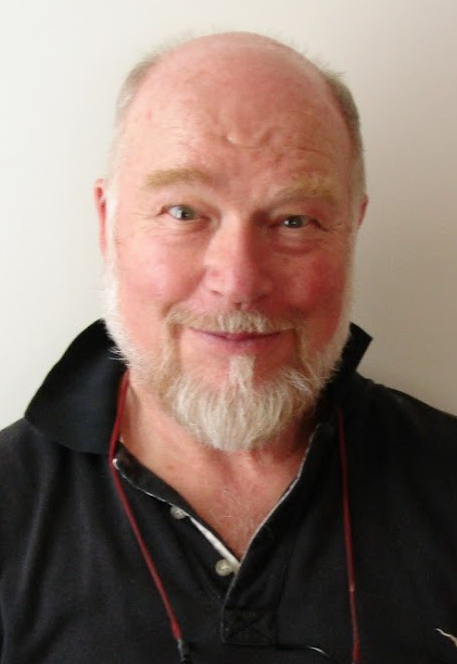
Andrew Leachman

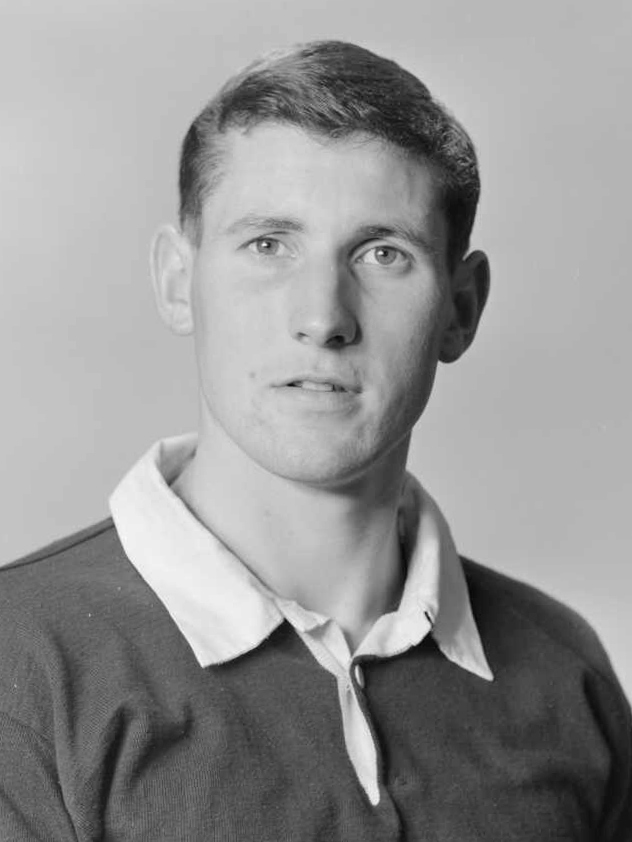
Ian Smith

=== October ===
- 2 October – Peter Burke, rugby union player, coach and administrator (born 1927)
- 3 October – Norma Williams, swimmer, swimming administrator (born 1928)
- 12 October – Derek Steward, athlete (born 1928)
- 15 October – Francis Pound, art historian, curator and writer (born 1948)
- 19 October – Edmund Cotter, mountaineer (born 1927)
- 21 October – Dave Leech, hammer thrower (born 1927)
- 22 October – Sandy Thomas, military leader (born 1919)
- 23 October – Gordon Ogilvie, historian, biographer (born 1934)
- 29 October – Roly Green, rugby union player (born 1927)
- 30 October – James Beard, architect, town planner, landscape architect (born 1924)
- 31 October
  - Norman Hardie, mountaineer (born 1924)
  - Terry McCashin, rugby union player, brewer (born 1944)
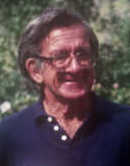
Norman Hardie

=== November ===
- 5 November – Geoff Rothwell, World War II bomber pilot (born 1920)
- 6 November – Clem Parker, athlete (born 1926)
- 7 November – Paddles, cat owned by Jacinda Ardern
- 9 November – Tom Coughlan, rugby union player (born 1934)
- 15 November
  - Dame Sister Pauline Engel, educator (born 1930)
  - Moana Manley, swimmer, beauty pageant contestant (born 1935)
  - Bert Ormond, association footballer (born 1931)

=== December ===
- 7 December – Neil Ritchie, cyclist (born 1933)
- 12 December – Jane Galletly, television scriptwriter (born 1928)
- 13 December
  - Simon Dickie, rowing coxswain (born 1951)
  - Gerald O'Brien, MP for Island Bay from 1969 to 1978 (born 1924)
- 15 December – Michael Hartshorn, organic chemist (born 1936)
- 17 December – Castletown, Thoroughbred racehorse (foaled 1986)
- 21 December – John Vear, cricketer (born 1938)
- 30 December – Dame Cheryll Sotheran, museum executive (born 1945)
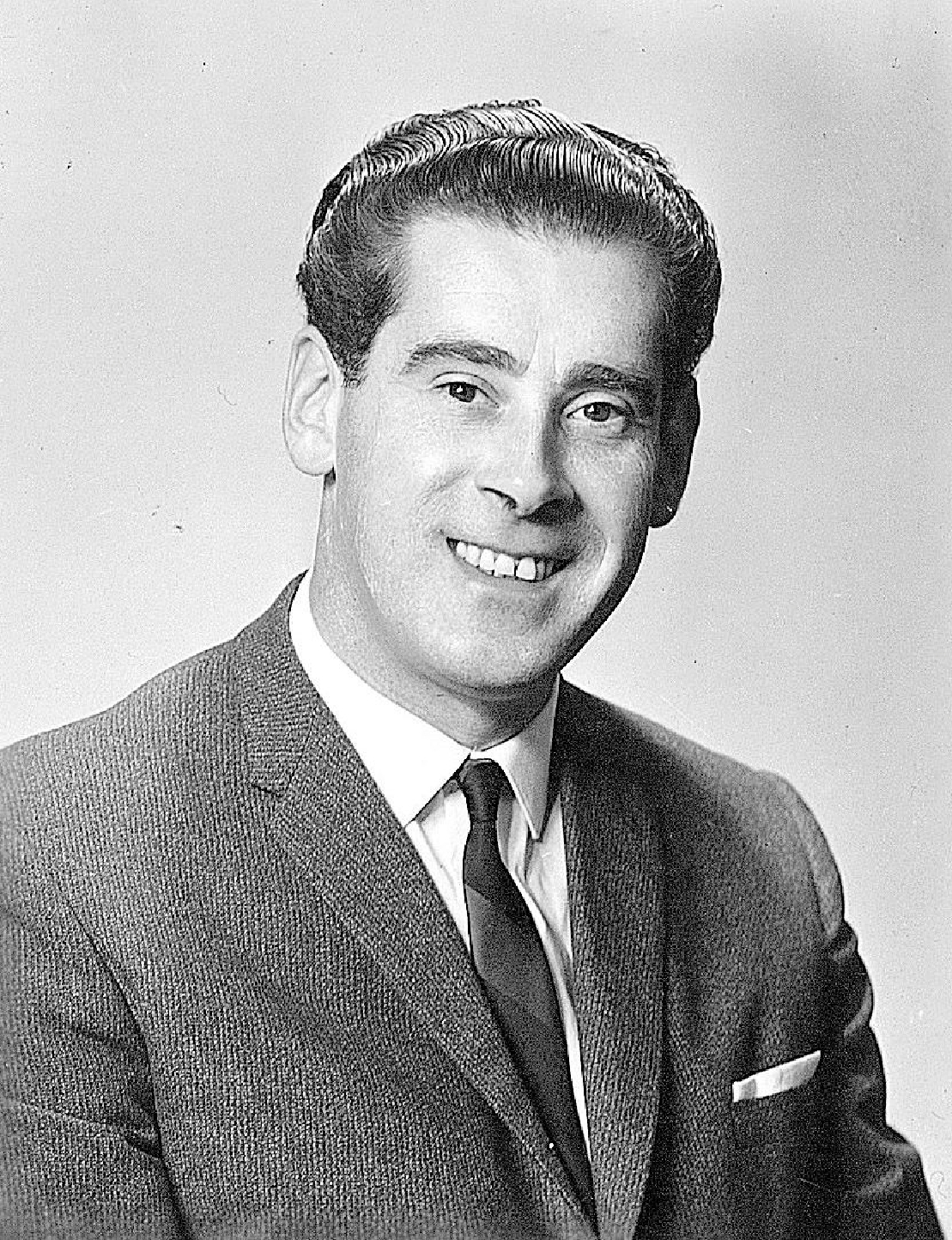
Gerald O'Brien
