= Vear (surname) =

Vear is a surname. Notable people with the surname include:

- Brian Vear (1937–2008), Australian rower
- John Vear (1938–2017), New Zealand cricketer
- Percy Vear (1911–1983), English boxer
- Steve Vear (born 1952), American politician
