= Tom Homer (disambiguation) =

Tom Homer or Thomas Homer may refer to:

- Tom Homer (born 1990), English rugby union player
- Tom Homer (footballer) (1886-?), English footballer
- Thomas J. Homer (born 1947), American politician

== See also ==
- Tom Hamer (born 1999), English footballer
- Tim Homer (1973/1974–2017), New Zealand radio personality
