= Geoff Rothwell =

Geoff Rothwell

Squadron Leader Geoffrey Maurice Rothwell DFC and Bar (3 April 1920 – 5 November 2017) was a Royal Air Force bomber pilot during the Second World War who flew more than 70 missions over occupied Europe including dropping secret agents at their rendezvous.
