= Nick Kirk =

Nick Kirk was Dean of Nelson: from 2011 A former nurse, he was previously the incumbent at Christ Church, Wanganui.

Kirk had motor neuron disease. He died in Wanganui on 24 June 2017.
