= Ian Mason (cricketer) =

New Zealand cricketer

Ian Robert Mason (14 April 1942 – 18 July 2017) was a New Zealand cricketer who played six first-class matches between 1960 and 1966.

Born in Wellington, Mason represented Wellington in the Plunket Shield. He also captained the New Zealand Under-23 cricket team in their annual first-class match in March 1964.

Mason and his wife Jane had four children: Dr Diana Amundsen was the eldest, followed by Paul Mason, Carolyn Mortland and Sonia Minnaar. He died in Tauranga on 18 July 2017.
