= Steel & Tube =

New Zealand iron and steel company

Steel & Tube Holdings Limited
- Type: Public
- Traded as: NZX: STU
- Industry: Metals
- Predecessors: Stewarts & Lloyds of New Zealand; The Iron & Steel Company of New Zealand; McLean & Todd
- Founded: 1953
- Headquarters: Auckland, New Zealand
- Key people: Susan Paterson (Chair); Mark Malpass (Chief Executive)
- Website: www.steelandtube.co.nz

Steel & Tube Holdings Limited is a New Zealand-listed company that was established in 1953 with the merger of Stewarts & Lloyds of New Zealand, The Iron & Steel Company of New Zealand and McLean & Todd to form a steel company with a national reach.

== History ==
Steel & Tube was listed on the New Zealand Exchange in 1967. In 1980 Tenon subsidiary Fletcher Metals became the largest shareholder by purchasing 25% of the company from British Steel Corporation.

In 1985 Tubemakers of Australia became a minor shareholder with an 8.8% share in Steel & Tube.

In 1999 Fletcher Challenge, through its subsidiary; Fletcher Steel, were granted an application with the Commerce Commission to acquire up to 100% of Steel & Tube. This application expired in December 2000 with the company not acquiring a share in Steel & Tube. In 2001 the company applied through the same channels for the same application stating they did not purchase shares with the previous application due to OneSteel backing out of its first sale bid for 50.01% of Steel & Tube as well as increasing volatility within the Australasian steel market.

In 2012 Steel & Tube Holding replaced Fisher & Paykel's spot on the NZX 50 Index after Fisher & Paykel was acquired by Haier. Steel & Tube dropped out of the NZX 50 Index on 16 September 2016.

On 28 April 2020, it became known that Steel & Tube would bring forward some restructuring caused by the economic downturn from the COVID-19 pandemic. Between 150 and 200 jobs are expected to be lost.

== OneSteel/Arrium ==
On 29 September 2008 Australian company OneSteel launched a takeover bid. OneSteel already was the majority shareholder with a shareholding of 50.27%. The takeover bid valued Steel & Tube at $438 million. The $175 million bid had been abandoned by 20 October 2008; which led to a 22% share price drop for Steel & Tube.

On 10 October 2012, Arrium announced its intention to sell its Steel & Tube stake at a 15% discounted price of $91.2 million.

For the first time in its history; Steel & Tube became a 100% New Zealand-owned company when its majority shareholder Arrium sold its 50.3% share in 2012 to institutional investors. Buyers included the New Zealand Government through the Accident Compensation Corporation who spent $12 million for a 7.2% share.

== Investments ==
In the mid-1980s Steel & Tube acquired a 25% stake in New Zealand Steel. Also in the deal, they acquired undisclosed stakes in New Zealand Motor Corporation, Domtrac Equipment, and Healing Industries.

Between 1988 and 1995 Steel & Tube began a series of acquisitions that would strengthen their share in the New Zealand steel market. They would acquire Cable Price Steel in 1989, Acorn Pacific Corporation in 1990, as well as Stewart Steel and GW Taylor Industries in 1992.

In 2006, Steel & Tube purchased New Zealand Fasteners Stainless Group for $11 million.

In April 2014 Steel & Tube purchased the Australasian arm of Indian-company Tata Group for $28.1 million. After the purchase Tata was renamed S&T Stainless.

In July 2015 it was announced that Steel & Tube would purchase Manufacturing Suppliers for $32 million.

In August 2015 Steel & Tube purchased Aquaduct NZ after it fell into receivership for $8 million. During this acquisition phase they also purchased Bosch Irrigation from the same receivers for an undisclosed sum. The companies were owned by Gerard van den Bosch and other members of the van den Bosch family before going into receivership.

== Controversy ==
In 2014 Steel & Tube came under scrutiny after an anonymous complaint led to the New Zealand Exchange investigating the company for infractions of the code of listing. Three breaches were noted; failing to ensure chief executive Dave Taylor retired as a director at its annual meeting, failing to announce the resignation of an officer, and failing to announce a change of registered address. As a result of the breaches, the company was fined $12,000 plus other costs and were given a Notice of Censure by the New Zealand Exchange.
