= Healthy Homes Guarantee Act 2017 =

Act of Parliament in New Zealand

Healthy Homes Act 2017

New Zealand Parliament
- Long title: An Act to ensure that every rental home in New Zealand meets minimum standards of heating and insulation.
- Royal assent: 4 December 2017
- Commenced: 1 July 2019
- Administered by: Ministry for Business, Innovation and Employment

Legislative history
- Introduced by: Phil Twyford
- Committee responsible: Labour Party
- Passed: 2017

Related legislation
- Residential Tenancies Act 1986
- Status: Current legislation

The Healthy Homes Guarantee Act is an Act of Parliament in New Zealand which sets minimum standards for rental housing including heating and insulation. It passed its third reading on 30 November 2017 and received royal assent on 4 December 2017.

== Legislative history ==
The Healthy Homes Guarantee Act 2017 amended the Residential Tenancies Act 1986 to enable minimum standards for rental housing to be prescribed by regulations. The standards were subsequently established in 2019 and cover heating, insulation, ventilation, moisture ingress and drainage, and draught stopping.

== Implementation ==
The standards were set by the Residential Tenancies (Healthy Homes Standards) Regulations 2019 and cover heating, insulation, ventilation, moisture ingress and drainage, and draught stopping. Landlords must provide one or more fixed heaters capable of directly heating the main living room, while ceiling and underfloor insulation has been compulsory in rental homes since 1 July 2019, subject to applicable exemptions.

The standards also address windows through ventilation and draught-stopping requirements, but do not mandate double glazing. An analysis of the heating-capacity calculation for a typical living room found that replacing single glazing with double glazing reduced the calculated heating requirement by approximately 11–12%, without eliminating the need for a qualifying fixed heater.

Compliance was phased in. From 1 July 2019, landlords had to sign a statement of intent to comply, and from 1 December 2020, tenancy agreements had to include a statement of the property's current level of compliance. Boarding houses had to comply by 1 July 2021, and houses rented by Kāinga Ora and registered community housing providers by 1 July 2024. Private tenancies started or renewed between 1 July 2021 and 27 August 2022 had to comply within 90 days, and those between 28 August 2022 and 2 March 2025 within 120 days. All private rentals have had to comply since 1 July 2025. Landlords who do not meet the standards may face penalties of up to NZ$7,200.

== History ==
Twyford's Healthy Homes Guarantee Bill was first drawn from the Parliamentary ballot in 2013, but was struck down at its first reading. Then-Labour leader Andrew Little introduced a second version, which made it through its second reading with the votes of every party except ACT and National. This allowed Labour to pick up the bill, modify it, and pass it relatively quickly.

On 29 November 2017 the bill passed its third reading by 63 votes to 57, where the Labour-led Coalition Government had supported the bill to become law. The opposition parties National and ACT opposed the bill. The Healthy Homes Guarantee Bill became law after receiving royal assent on 4 December 2017.
