= Tony Laffey =

New Zealand footballer

Personal information
- Full name: Anthony Joseph Patrick Laffey
- Date of birth: 28 May 1925
- Place of birth: Christchurch, New Zealand
- Date of death: 18 September 2017 (aged 92)
- Place of death: Nelson, New Zealand
- Position: Defender

Senior career*
Years	Team	Apps	(Gls)
- Western

International career
1958	New Zealand	1	(0)
- * Club domestic league appearances and goals

Anthony Joseph Patrick Laffey (28 May 1925 – 18 September 2017) was an association football player who represented New Zealand at international level.

Laffey made a solitary official A-international appearance for New Zealand in a 5–1 win over New Caledonia on 7 September 1958.

In addition to his cap-earning appearance Laffey played nine other matches for New Zealand between 1955 and 1959 against touring club and regional representative sides.

Laffey was awarded Canterbury FA sportsman of the year award on two occasions. He died in Nelson on 18 September 2017.
