= Shirley Annan =

New Zealand netball player

Personal information
- Full name: Shirley Mary Annan (Née: Patrick)
- Born: 30 September 1940
- Died: 27 March 2017 (aged 76) Invercargill, New Zealand
- Height: 1.79 m (5 ft 10 in)
- Spouses: (1) Peter Stanton Erwood (2) William Leonard Annan

Netball career
- Playing positions: GK, GD
Years	Club team	Apps
- Otago
- Canterbury
Years	National team	Caps
1960	New Zealand	3

Shirley Mary Annan (née Patrick, 30 September 1940 – 27 March 2017) was a New Zealand netball player. A goal keeper and goal defence, Annan was noted for her tight marking. She represented both Otago and Canterbury at a provincial level, and played three games for the New Zealand national netball team in 1960. Her granddaughter, Abby Erwood, also a netball player, made her debut for the Southern Steel in 2015.

Annan died on 27 March 2017, and was buried at Alexandra Cemetery.
