= Roly Green =

- Born: Roland Leslie Green; 1 September 1927
- Died: 29 October 2017 (aged 90) Timaru, New Zealand
- Notable relative: James Green (great-uncle)

Rugby union career
- Position: Halfback
Provincial / State sides
Years	Team	Apps	(Points)
1950–52	South Canterbury	19	

Roland Leslie Green (1 September 1927 – 29 October 2017) was a New Zealand rugby union player. A halfback, Green represented South Canterbury at a provincial level from 1950 to 1952, playing 19 matches for the union, including its first Ranfurly Shield victory in 1950. When he died in Timaru on 29 October 2017, Green was the last surviving member of the playing XV from that match.

Born on 1 September 1927, Green was the son of Daisy Green (née Aitchison) and Richard Corbett Cooper Green, whose father Isaac Green served four terms as mayor of North East Valley in Dunedin. Isaac Green's brother, James Green, was a New Zealand member of Parliament.
