= Tim Homer =

- Homer (left) with English singer Ozzy Osbourne (right) in 2013
- Born: 1973 or 1974
- Died: 6 August 2017 (aged 43)
- Spouse(s): Corinna Homer (Until his death in 2017)
- Children: 3

Timothy John Homer (born 1973 or 1974 – 6 August 2017) was a New Zealand radio personality. His last role in radio was assistant content director at The Sound. Before this, Homer had worked previously with ZM, Kiwi FM and More FM.

Homer died unexpectedly on 6 August 2017.
