= John Vear =

New Zealand cricketer (1938–2017)

Personal information
- Full name: Dennis John Vear
- Born: 5 April 1938; Auckland, New Zealand
- Died: 21 December 2017 (aged 79); Christchurch, New Zealand
- Batting: Right-handed
- Bowling: Right-arm medium
- Role: All-rounder

Domestic team information
- Years: Team
- 1958/59–1968/69: Southland
- 1959/60–1960/61: Otago
- FC debut: 5 February 1960 Otago v Central Districts
- Last FC: 5 January 1961 Otago v Northern Districts

Career statistics
| Competition | First-class |
|---|---|
| Matches | 3 |
| Runs scored | 91 |
| Batting average | 16.33 |
| 100s/50s | 0/0 |
| Top score | 22 |
| Balls bowled | 336 |
| Wickets | 1 |
| Bowling average | 94.00 |
| 5 wickets in innings | 0 |
| 10 wickets in match | 0 |
| Best bowling | 1/19 |
| Catches/stumpings | 2/– |
- Source: CricInfo, 4 January 2018

Dennis John Vear (5 April 1938 – 21 December 2017) was a New Zealand cricketer who played three first-class matches for Otago in the early 1960s. He also played for Southland in the Hawke Cup competition.

Vear was born at Auckland in 1938 and educated at Wellington College where he played cricket. He played age-group cricket for Wellington under 20 sides from 1954–55 until 1956–57 and played for Nelson in their Newman Shield victory over Marlborough in February 1955, taking five wickets in the Marlborough first innings. The following season he played for North Island under-20s in a New Zealand Colts trial match.

After moving to Invercargill, Vear first played for Southland during the 1958–59 season before making his first-class debut for Otago the following season. An all-rounder, he failed to take a wicket but scored 22 runs in the only innings in which Otago batted in February 1960 against Central Districts. In the event this was his highest first-class score. He opened the bowling for Otago against Auckland in early January 1961 but again failed to take a wicket, before going on to take a single wicket in the side's next match against Northern Districts, Vear's final first-class fixture.

Considered a "batsman of good sense" and a bowler who could "make the ball rise uncomfortably from a good length", Vear continued to play for Southland until the end of the 1960s. He appeared in four Hawke Cup matches for the province and was a mainstay of its bowling attack throughout the decade.

Vear died at Christchurch in December 2017. He was aged 79.
