= Antoine de Roquelaure =

French statesman (1544–1625)

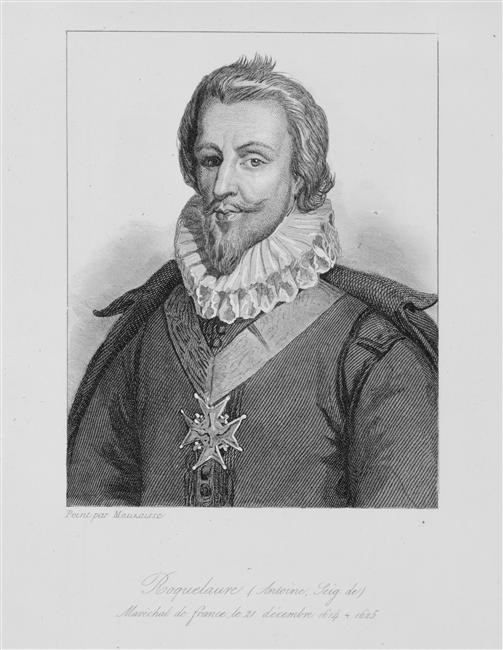
Antoine de Roquelaure

Antoine de Roquelaure (Antòni de Ròcalaura in Occitan), lord of Roquelaure, Gaudoux, Sainte-Christie, Mirepoix, Montbert, Baron of Lavardens and Biran (1544 – Lectoure, 1625) was an important sixteenth-century French statesman and close collaborator of Henry IV. He was made marshal of France in 1614 by Louis XIII.

== Background and early life ==
The existence of lords of Roquelaure is documented to at least the twelfth century. The Roquelaure family held the fief in conjunction with the lords from whom they received it. The family acquired the seigneurie of Saint-Aubin in the early fourteenth century when Brunissent de Savaillan, lady of Saint-Aubin and widow of Bertrand II of Roquelaure, granted the fief to her son Pierre de Roquelaure after her second marriage.

Antoine de Roquelaure was the third son of Géraud, lord of Roquelaure, Gaudoux, Montbert and Le Longard, (died 1557) and Catherine de Bezolles. As such he was originally destined by his father for an ecclesiastical career, but at his father's death, he inherited the seigneurie of Le Longard and placed himself in the service of Antoine of Navarre.

== Association with Navarre ==
Jeanne III of Navarre held him in such high regard that after the death of her husband Antoine in 1563, she granted him the part of the fief of Roquelaure that the crown of Navarre possessed and placed him in the service of her son, Henry, who was then only nine years old. At eighteen, Antoine de Roquelare was still young, and Henry soon appreciated the loyalty and devotion of his brilliant companion. Roquelaure eventually came into the full possession of the fief after the death of his two elder brothers, Jean-Bernard and Bernard in the Wars of Religion.

Roquelaure formed part of the retinue that accompanied the young Huguenot king to Paris on the occasion of his marriage to Marguerite of Valois in 1572 and participated in his escape four years later from confinement during a hunt. He formed part of the group of confidants who counseled the king at his court at Nérac and participated in the siege of Eauze in 1579.

== In the service of France ==
Coat of arms of the Roquelaures

After Henry became the legitimate heir to the throne of France in 1589, Roquelaure followed him in all his battles to secure the crown: Coutras, Arques and Ivry. As a Catholic, Roquelaure played an important role in convincing Henry to adopt that faith to strengthen his hold on the French crown. His service gained him many charges and benefices which turned him into one of the most important persons of the kingdom. He was made master of the wardrobe in 1589, a knight of the Order of the Holy Spirit and lieutenant-general of Upper Auvergne, captain of the Palace of Fontainebleau, and later governor of the County of Foix, lieutenant-general of Guyenne in 1597 and mayor of Bordeaux.

On 16 May 1610, Roquelaure was with the king in the carriage in which he was murdered by François Ravaillac.

During the regency, Marie de Medicis entrusted to him the suppression of cities which had risen against it, and for these services he was honored in 1614 with the title of Marshal of France by Louis XIII.

He resigned the post of governor of Guyenne in 1613 and only kept the office of governor of Lectoure, which allowed him to return to his domains. He died in Lectoure in 1625 at the age of 81 years.

== Descendants ==
In 1581 he married Catherine d'Ornesan, who died in 1601. They had six children, but he had no male descendants at the time of the death of his son Jean-Louis in 1610. He remarried in 1611 with Susanne de Bassabat, with whom he had twelve children, among them Gaston-Jean-Baptiste de Roquelaure (1617–1683), his main heir. A celebrated wit, Gaston was created the first duke of Roquelaure and peer of France in 1652 (although the peerage remained unregistered) and was appointed governor of Guyenne in 1679.

Gaston's son, Antoine Gaston de Roquelaure (1656–1738), carried on the family reputation for wit. At a young age served in the Franco-Dutch War and later in the Nine Years' War. He was made governor of Languedoc in 1706 and received the marshal's bâton in 1724. The second duke of Roquelaure also gave his name to the "roquelaure" or "roquelaire", a knee-length cloak.

His daughter, Françoise, married Louis Bretagne de Rohan-Chabot (son of Louis de Rohan-Chabot) in 1708 and as a result the duchy of Roquelaure passed to this family, who sold it, eventually coming into the possession of the king. The king sold it to Guillaume Dubarry in 1772.

A marquisate of Roquelaure was created in 1766 in favor of Charles de Roquelaure, lord of Saint-Aubin, but it should not be confused with the original peer-duchy.

== Sources ==
- Expilly, Jean-Joseph (1770). Dictionnaire géographique, historique et politique de Gaules et de la France. Vol. 6. Amsterdam. pp. 383–384.
- La Chesnaye des Bois, Alexandre Aubert de (1778). Dictionnaire de la noblesse, contenant les généalogies. Vol. 12. pp. 306–319.
- Lafforgue, Prosper (1851). Histoire de la ville d'Auch depuis le romains jusqu'en 1789. Vol. 2. Auch: L.-A. Brun. pp. 300–302, 370.
