= Roquelaure =

- Commune
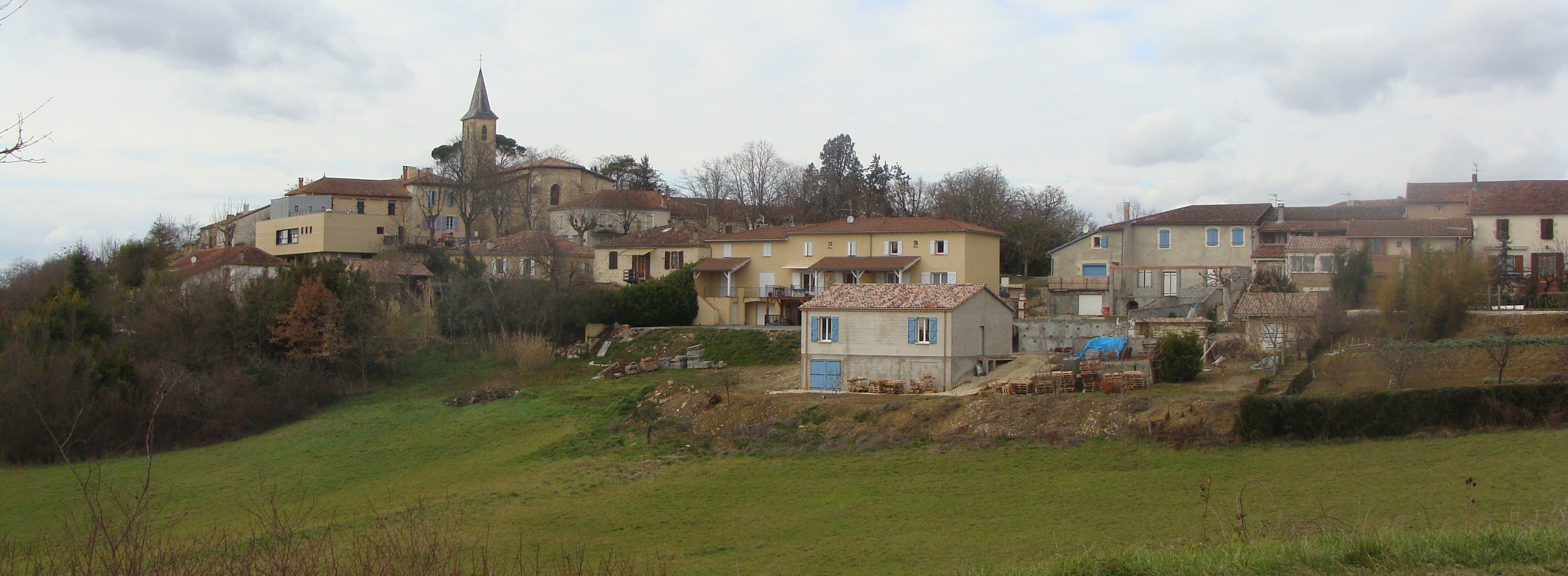
- A general view of Roquelaure
- Location of Roquelaure
- Location within France Location within Occitanie
- Coordinates: 43°43′16″N 0°34′47″E
- Country: France
- Region: Occitania
- Department: Gers
- Arrondissement: Auch
- Canton: Gascogne-Auscitaine
- Intercommunality: CA Grand Auch Cœur Gascogne

Government
  - Mayor (2020–2026): Michel Baylac
- Area^{1}: 21.23 km^{2} (8.20 sq mi)
- Elevation: 228 m (748 ft)
- Highest elevation: 239 m (784 ft)
- Lowest elevation: 106 m (348 ft)
- Population (2023): 563
  - Density: 26.5/km^{2} (68.7/sq mi)
- Time zone: UTC+01:00 (CET)
  - Summer (DST): UTC+02:00 (CEST)
- INSEE/Postal code: 32348 /32810
- ^{1} French Land Register data, which excludes lakes, ponds, glaciers > 1 km^{2} (0.386 sq mi or 247 acres) and river estuaries.

Roquelaure (French pronunciation: [ʁɔkloʁ]; Ròcalaura in Gascon) is a commune in the Gers department in southwestern France.

== Geography ==
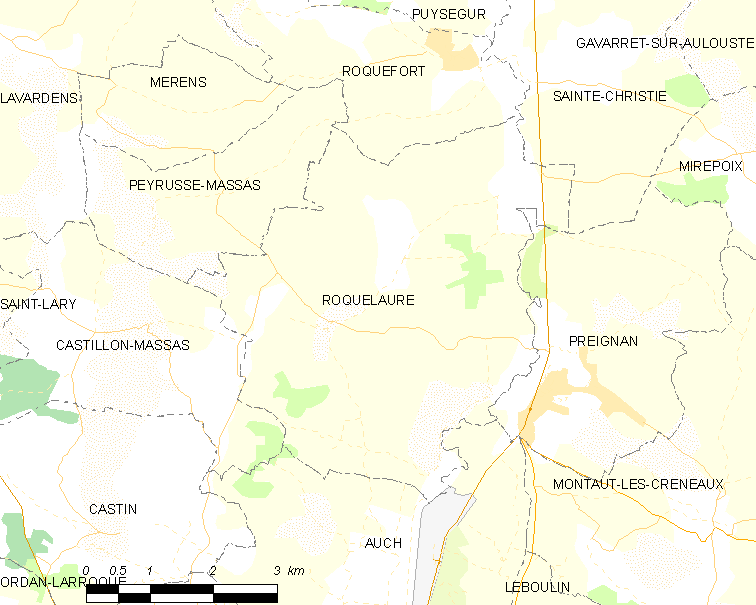
Roquelaure and its surrounding communes

== History ==
The village is situated on a rocky height near the site of an Iron-Age oppidum and Gallo Roman villa on the neighboring hill of La Ciotat (La Sioutat). The ruins of Roman baths were found in the 18th century, which may be part of the same villa that was discovered more recently in 1898 and excavated in the 1960s.

The name Roquelaure means "laurel hill" in Gascon. A medieval fortified town was built at the current location sometime in the 12th century under the auspices of a lord of Roquelaure, and it received its charter (charte de coutumes) in 1244. From the 16th century on, the lords of Roquelaure built and maintained a chapel in the Gothic Church of Saint-Loup. The lords of Roquelaure, including Antoine de Roquelaure (1544–1625), are buried in the church crypt. Antoine de Roquelaure built the nearby château of Rieutort and began refurbishing the castle at Lavardens, a project which was never completed. Francis I had a fort built on the northern slope of the village hill, guarding the road to Peyrusse-Massas, the ruins of which remain. The grounds of the fort have been the Robert Dauzère Stadium since 1969.

The former commune of Arcamont was joined to Roquelaure in 1952.

== Government and politics ==
=== Mayors ===
Mayor	Term start	Term end
Michel Baylac	2001	

== Population ==
Historical population
Year	Pop.	±% p.a.
1968	424	—
1975	338	−3.19%
1982	392	+2.14%
1990	464	+2.13%
1999	454	−0.24%
2007	529	+1.93%
2012	584	+2.00%
2017	572	−0.41%
2023	563	−0.26%
Source: INSEE

== Viticulture ==
The lands of the commune of Roquelaure are classified as part of the Côtes de Montestruc and Côtes de Gascogne vin de pays zones. They are also part of the Haut-Armagnac zone.

== Duchy ==
The seigneurie of Roquelaure was elevated to a duchy in 1652 in favor of Gaston-Jean-Baptiste de Roquelaure (1617–1683), son of Antoine de Roquelaure.

After this line died out, a different marquisate of Roquelaure was created in 1766 for their relatives, the lords of Saint-Aubin, today Roquelaure-Saint-Aubin.

== See also ==
- Communes of the Gers department
