= Castin =

- Commune
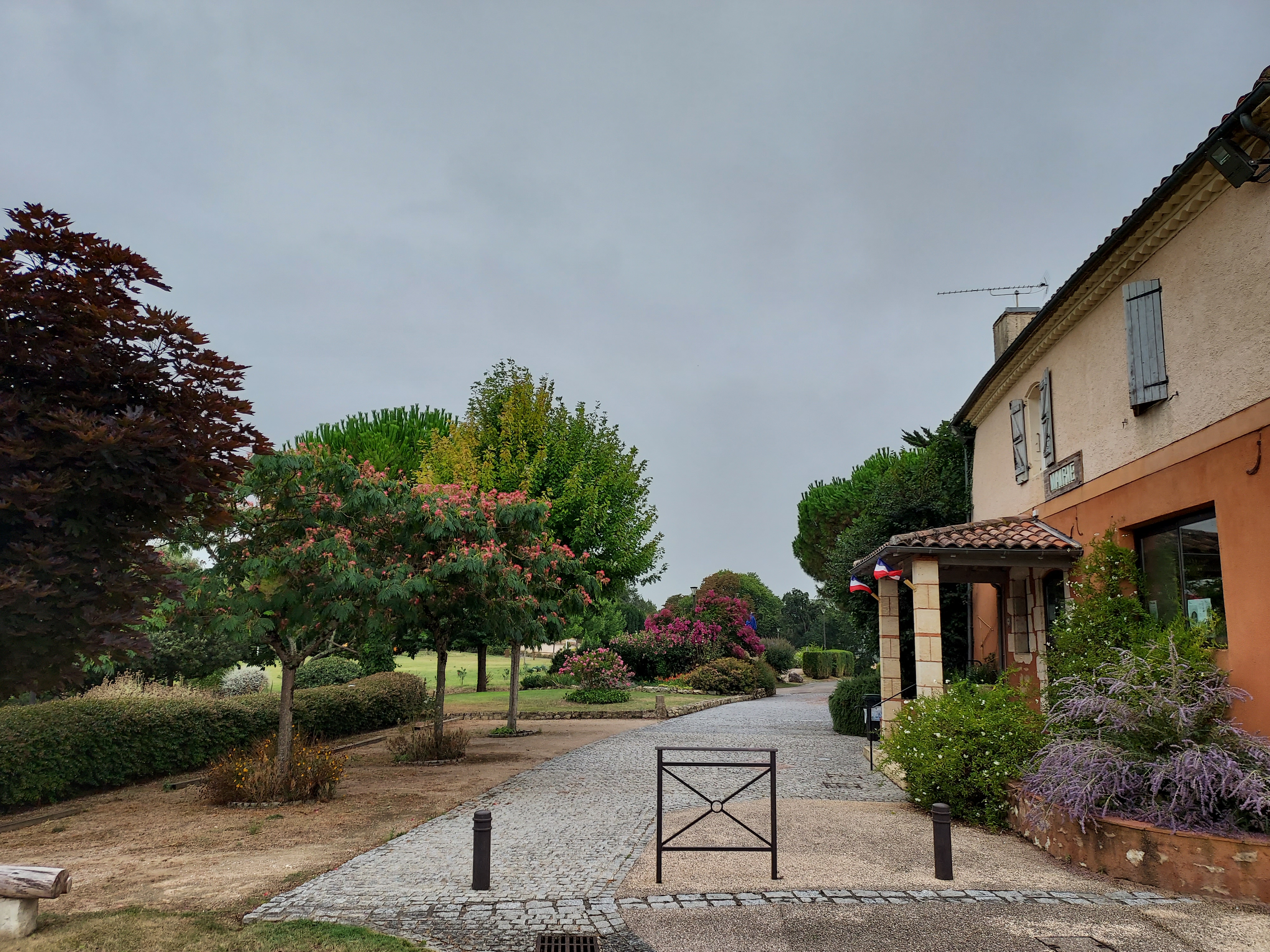
- Street of the town hall in Castin.

- Coat of arms
- Location of Castin
- Location within France Location within Occitanie
- Coordinates: 43°41′31″N 0°32′50″E
- Country: France
- Region: Occitania
- Department: Gers
- Arrondissement: Auch
- Canton: Gascogne-Auscitaine
- Intercommunality: CA Grand Auch Cœur Gascogne

Government
  - Mayor (2020–2026): Pierrette Luche
- Area^{1}: 11.22 km^{2} (4.33 sq mi)
- Elevation: 235 m (771 ft)
- Highest elevation: 266 m (873 ft)
- Lowest elevation: 148 m (486 ft)
- Population (2023): 337
  - Density: 30.0/km^{2} (77.8/sq mi)
- Time zone: UTC+01:00 (CET)
  - Summer (DST): UTC+02:00 (CEST)
- INSEE/Postal code: 32091 /32810
- ^{1} French Land Register data, which excludes lakes, ponds, glaciers > 1 km^{2} (0.386 sq mi or 247 acres) and river estuaries.

Castin (French pronunciation: [kastɛ̃]) is a commune in the Gers department in southwestern France.

== Geography ==
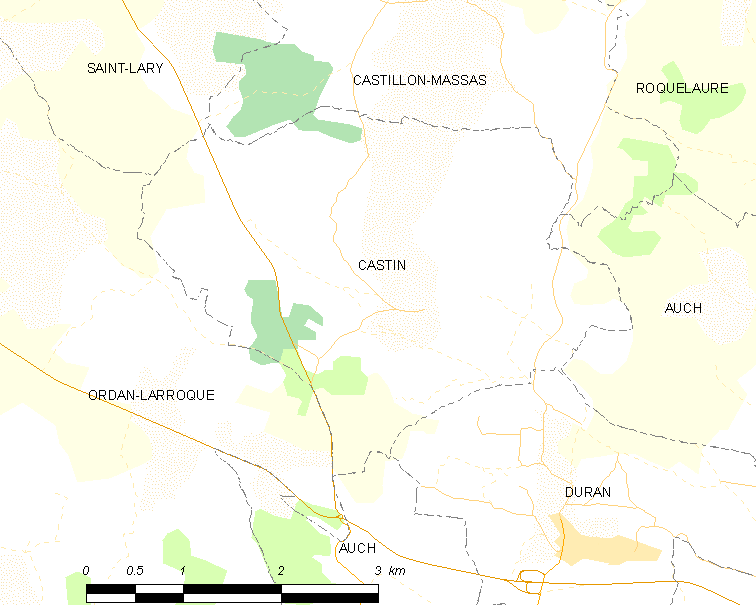
Castin and its surrounding communes

== Population ==
Historical population
| Year | Pop. | ±% p.a. |
|---|---|---|
| 1968 | 136 | — |
| 1975 | 141 | +0.52% |
| 1982 | 188 | +4.20% |
| 1990 | 262 | +4.24% |
| 1999 | 261 | −0.04% |
| 2007 | 267 | +0.28% |
| 2012 | 317 | +3.49% |
| 2017 | 343 | +1.59% |
| 2023 | 337 | −0.29% |
Source: INSEE

== See also ==
- Communes of the Gers department
