= Puycasquier =

- Commune
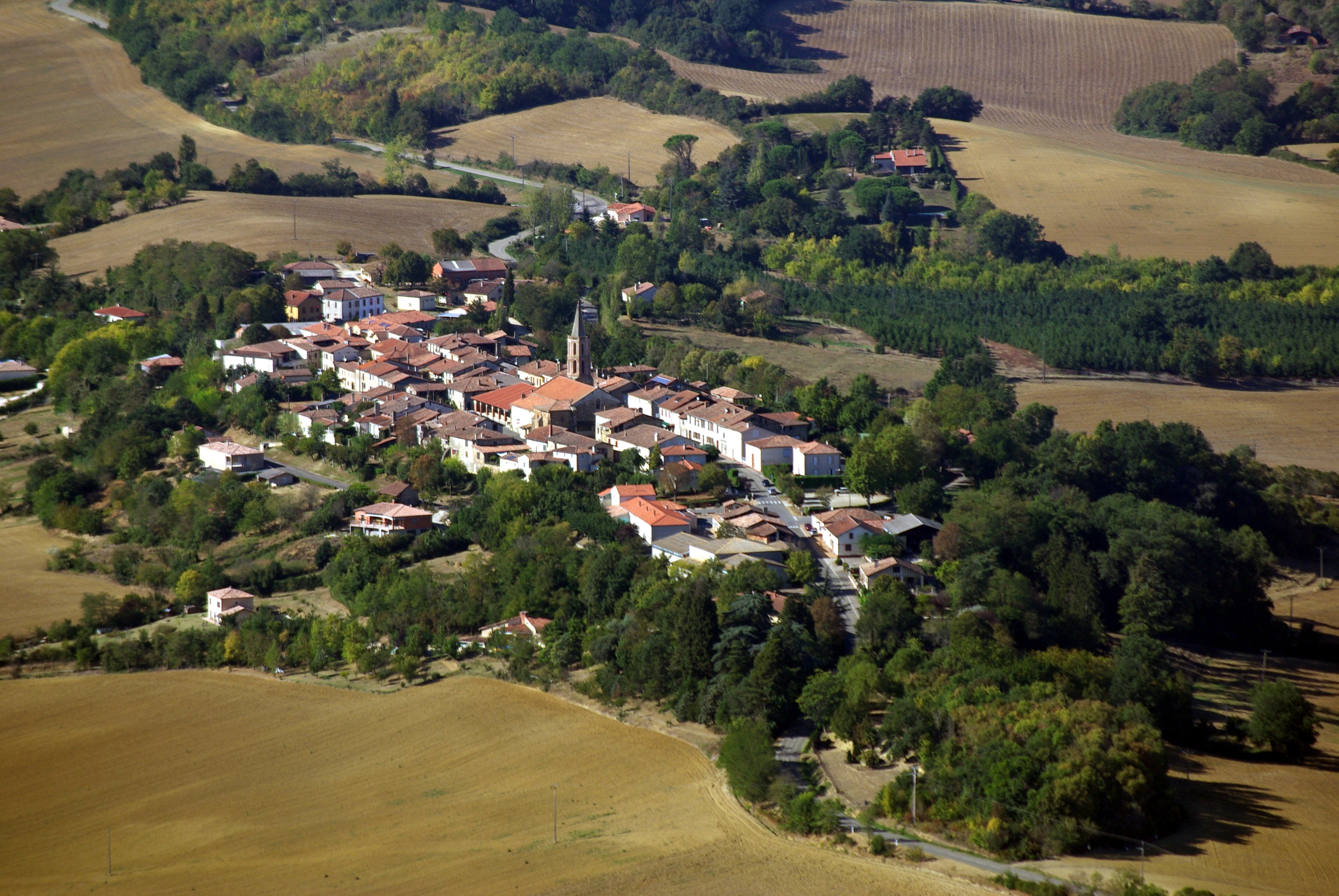
- A general view of Puycasquier
- Location of Puycasquier
- Location within France Location within Occitanie
- Coordinates: 43°44′50″N 0°44′54″E
- Country: France
- Region: Occitania
- Department: Gers
- Arrondissement: Auch
- Canton: Gascogne-Auscitaine
- Intercommunality: CA Grand Auch Cœur Gascogne

Government
  - Mayor (2020–2026): Louis Turchi
- Area^{1}: 20.14 km^{2} (7.78 sq mi)
- Elevation: 252 m (827 ft)
- Highest elevation: 264 m (866 ft)
- Lowest elevation: 146 m (479 ft)
- Population (2023): 420
  - Density: 21/km^{2} (54/sq mi)
- Time zone: UTC+01:00 (CET)
  - Summer (DST): UTC+02:00 (CEST)
- INSEE/Postal code: 32335 /32120
- ^{1} French Land Register data, which excludes lakes, ponds, glaciers > 1 km^{2} (0.386 sq mi or 247 acres) and river estuaries.

Puycasquier (French pronunciation: [pɥikaskje]; Gascon: Puicasquèr) is a rural commune in the Gers department in southwestern France.

== Geography ==
=== Localisation ===
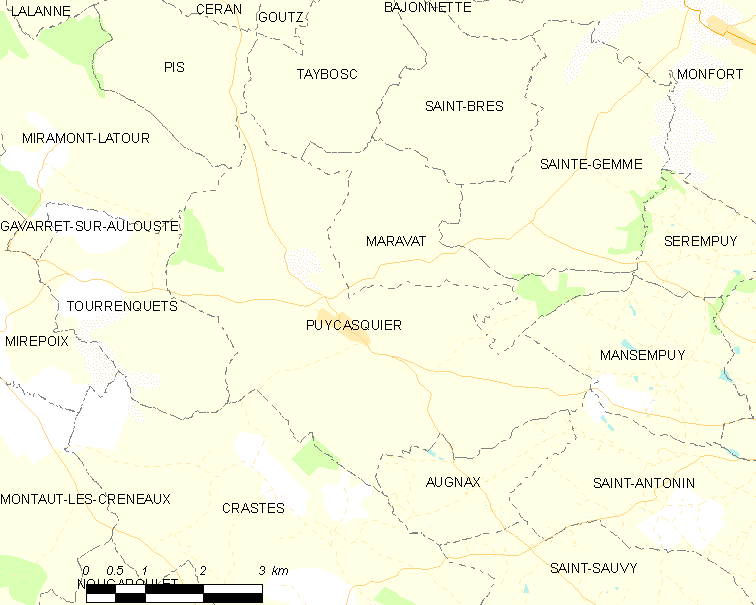
Puycasquier and its surrounding communes

=== Hydrography ===
The river Auroue flows north-northwest through the western part of the commune.

== Population ==
Historical population
Year	Pop.	±% p.a.
1968	507	—
1975	468	−1.14%
1982	431	−1.17%
1990	436	+0.14%
1999	424	−0.31%
2007	438	+0.41%
2012	470	+1.42%
2017	447	−1.00%
2023	420	−1.03%
Source: INSEE

== History ==
Home to the historic 'Gachet' family.

Puycasquier was home to a population of Cagots previously.

== See also ==
- Communes of the Gers department
