= Mérens =

- Commune
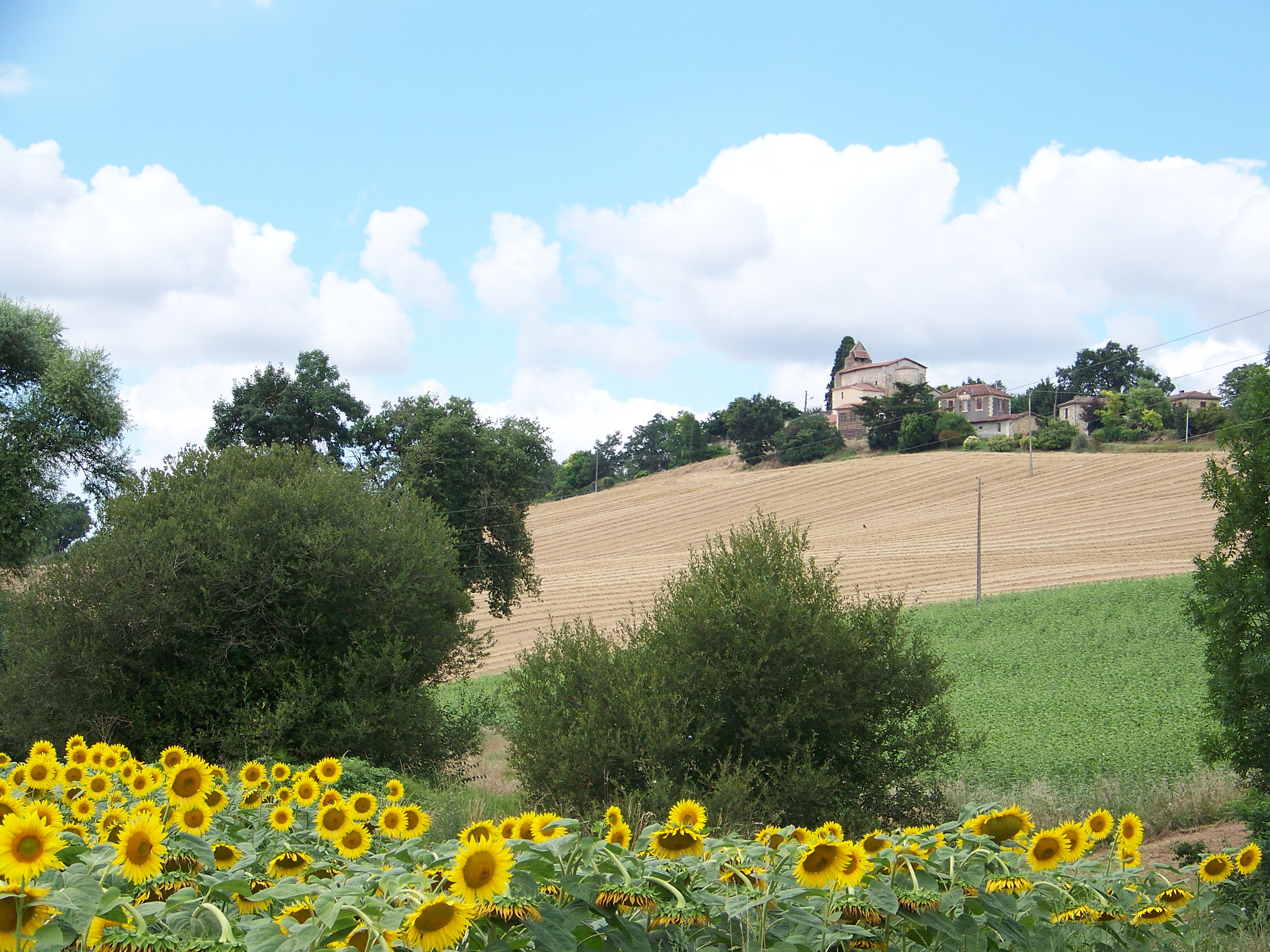
- A general view of Mérens
- Location of Mérens
- Location within France Location within Occitanie
- Coordinates: 43°45′16″N 0°32′19″E
- Country: France
- Region: Occitania
- Department: Gers
- Arrondissement: Auch
- Canton: Gascogne-Auscitaine
- Intercommunality: CA Grand Auch Cœur Gascogne

Government
  - Mayor (2020–2026): Marie-José Dallas-Ourbat
- Area^{1}: 4.18 km^{2} (1.61 sq mi)
- Elevation: 226 m (741 ft)
- Highest elevation: 244 m (801 ft)
- Lowest elevation: 126 m (413 ft)
- Population (2023): 66
  - Density: 16/km^{2} (41/sq mi)
- Time zone: UTC+01:00 (CET)
  - Summer (DST): UTC+02:00 (CEST)
- INSEE/Postal code: 32251 /32360
- ^{1} French Land Register data, which excludes lakes, ponds, glaciers > 1 km^{2} (0.386 sq mi or 247 acres) and river estuaries.

Mérens (Gascon: Merens) is a commune in the Gers department in southwestern France.

== Geography ==
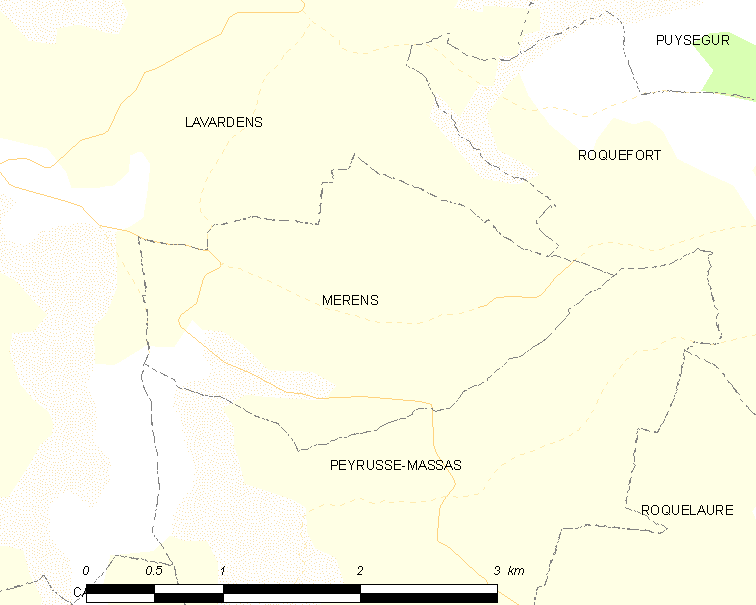
Mérens and its surrounding communes

== Population ==
Historical population
Year	Pop.	±% p.a.
1968	49	—
1975	43	−1.85%
1982	44	+0.33%
1990	40	−1.18%
1999	51	+2.74%
2007	62	+2.47%
2012	64	+0.64%
2017	64	+0.00%
2023	66	+0.51%
Source: INSEE

== See also ==
- Château de Mérens
- Communes of the Gers department
