= Duran, Gers =

Duran
- Commune
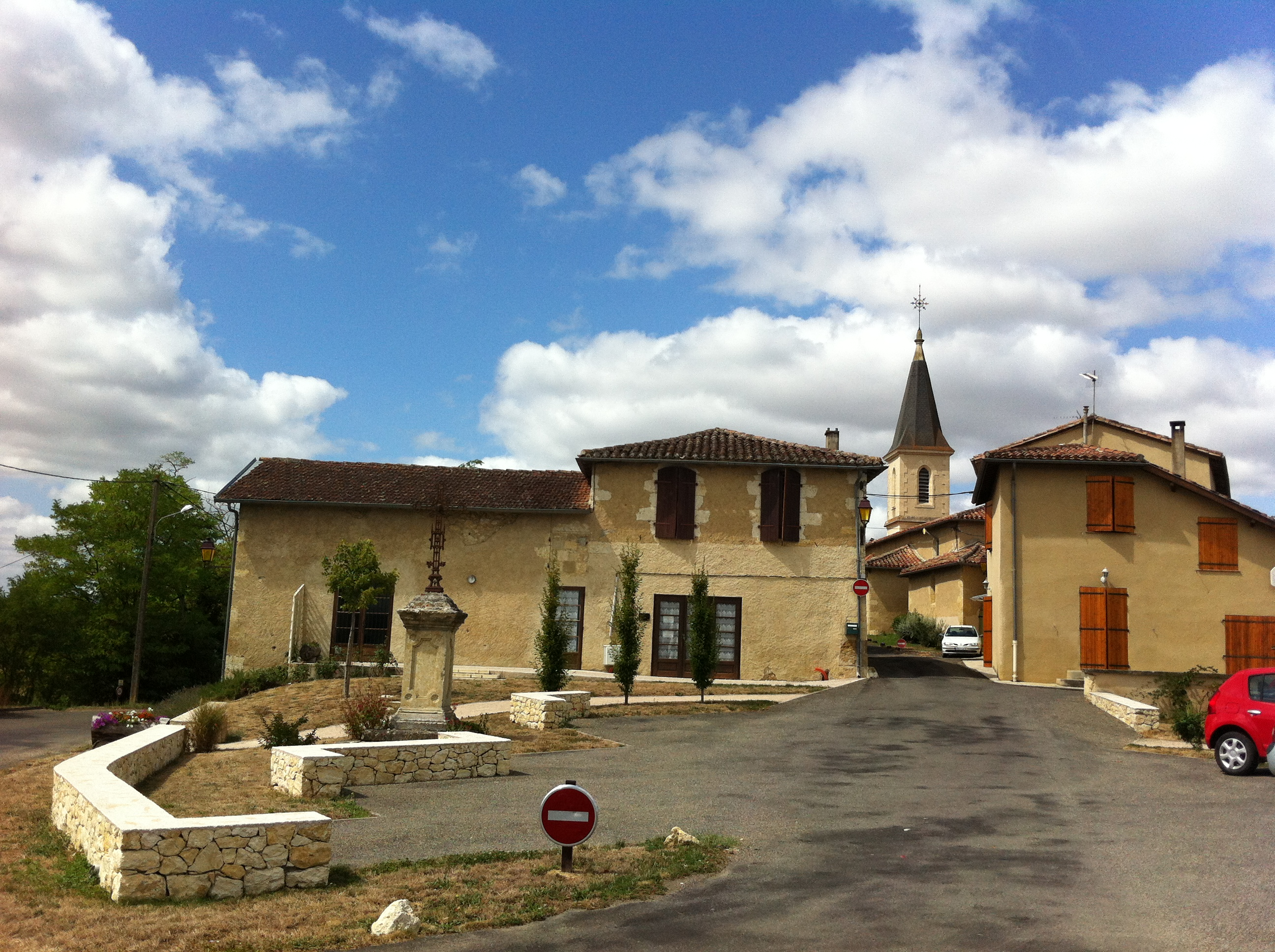
- The village of Duran

- Coat of arms
- Location of Duran
- Location within France Location within Occitanie
- Coordinates: 43°40′09″N 0°34′03″E
- Country: France
- Region: Occitania
- Department: Gers
- Arrondissement: Auch
- Canton: Gascogne-Auscitaine
- Intercommunality: CA Grand Auch Cœur Gascogne

Government
  - Mayor (2026–32): Ludovic Le Boulch
- Area^{1}: 6.59 km^{2} (2.54 sq mi)
- Elevation: 219 m (719 ft)
- Highest elevation: 256 m (840 ft)
- Lowest elevation: 137 m (449 ft)
- Population (2023): 862
  - Density: 131/km^{2} (339/sq mi)
- Time zone: UTC+01:00 (CET)
  - Summer (DST): UTC+02:00 (CEST)
- INSEE/Postal code: 32117 /32810
- ^{1} French Land Register data, which excludes lakes, ponds, glaciers > 1 km^{2} (0.386 sq mi or 247 acres) and river estuaries.

Duran (French pronunciation: [dyʁɑ̃]) is a commune in the Gers department in southwestern France.

== Geography ==
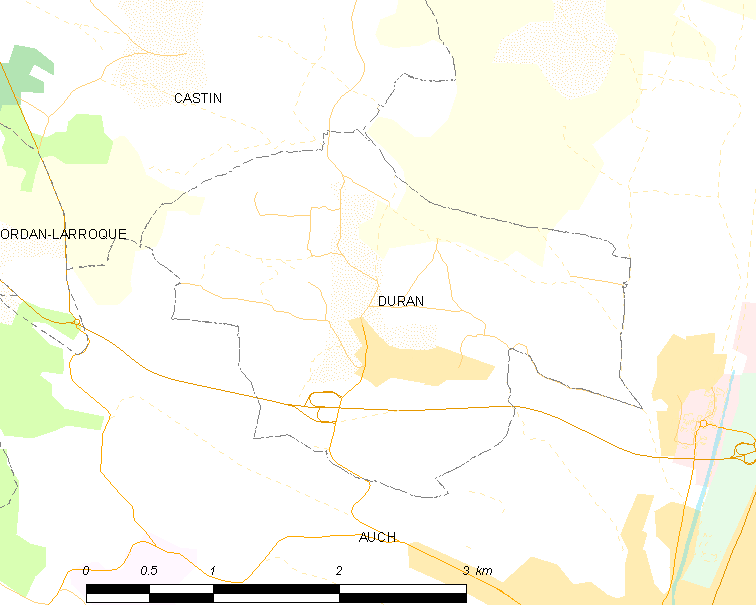
Duran and its surrounding communes

== Heraldry ==
Duran, Gers	Argent, two lions facing each other gules, supporting with their forepaws a tower sable, open and pierced of the field.

== Population ==
Historical population
Year	Pop.	±% p.a.
1968	343	—
1975	450	+3.96%
1982	515	+1.95%
1990	650	+2.95%
1999	665	+0.25%
2007	758	+1.65%
2012	839	+2.05%
2017	870	+0.73%
2023	862	−0.15%
Source: INSEE

== See also ==
- Communes of the Gers department
