= Bonas =

- Commune
- Location of Bonas
- Location within France Location within Occitanie
- Coordinates: 43°46′47″N 0°24′48″E
- Country: France
- Region: Occitania
- Department: Gers
- Arrondissement: Auch
- Canton: Gascogne-Auscitaine
- Intercommunality: CA Grand Auch Cœur Gascogne

Government
  - Mayor (2020–2026): Joèl Quesnel
- Area^{1}: 10.1 km^{2} (3.9 sq mi)
- Elevation: 190 m (620 ft)
- Highest elevation: 195 m (640 ft)
- Lowest elevation: 96 m (315 ft)
- Population (2023): 106
  - Density: 10.5/km^{2} (27.2/sq mi)
- Time zone: UTC+01:00 (CET)
  - Summer (DST): UTC+02:00 (CEST)
- INSEE/Postal code: 32059 /32410
- ^{1} French Land Register data, which excludes lakes, ponds, glaciers > 1 km^{2} (0.386 sq mi or 247 acres) and river estuaries.

Bonas is a commune in the Gers department in southwestern France.

== Geography ==
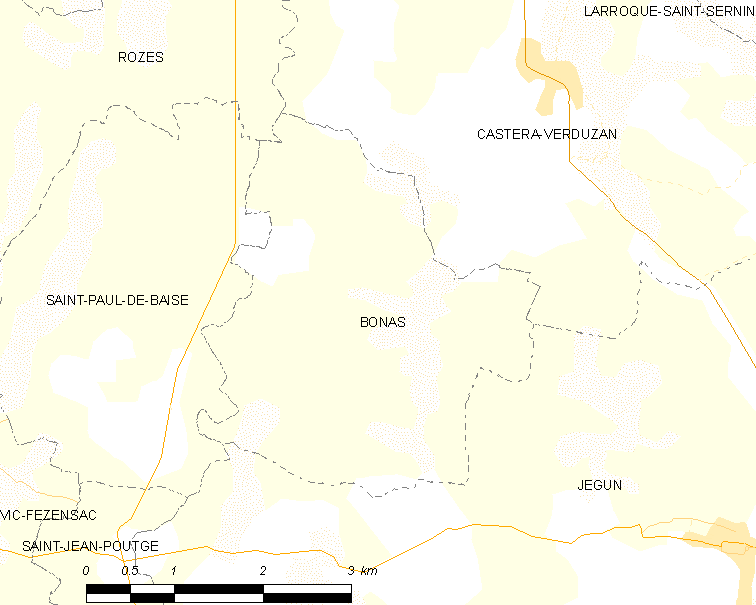
Bonas and its surrounding communes

== Population ==
Historical population
Year	Pop.	±% p.a.
1968	159	—
1975	143	−1.50%
1982	133	−1.03%
1990	135	+0.19%
1999	122	−1.12%
2007	135	+1.27%
2012	128	−1.06%
2017	133	+0.77%
2023	106	−3.71%
Source: INSEE

== See also ==
- Communes of the Gers department
