= Canton of Gascogne-Auscitaine =

Coordinates: 43.71°N 0.63°E

Gascogne-Auscitaine
- Canton
- Interactive map of Gascogne-Auscitaine
- Country: France
- Region: Occitania
- Department: Gers
- No. of communes: {{{nbcomm}}}

Government
  - Representatives (2021–2028): Bernard Ksaz; Lydie Toison
- Area: 346.74 km^{2} (133.88 sq mi)
- Population (2023): 9,217
  - Density: 26.58/km^{2} (68.85/sq mi)
- INSEE code: 32 10

The canton of Gascogne-Auscitaine is an administrative division of the Gers department, southwestern France. It was created at the French canton reorganisation which came into effect in March 2015. Its seat is in Preignan.

== Composition ==
It consists of the following communes:

1. Antras
2. Augnax
3. Biran
4. Bonas
5. Castillon-Massas
6. Castin
7. Crastes
8. Duran
9. Jegun
10. Lavardens
11. Mérens
12. Mirepoix
13. Montaut-les-Créneaux
14. Ordan-Larroque
15. Peyrusse-Massas
16. Preignan
17. Puycasquier
18. Roquefort
19. Roquelaure
20. Sainte-Christie
21. Saint-Lary
22. Tourrenquets

== Councillors ==
Election	Councillors	Party	Occupation
2015	Bernard Ksaz	PS	Tax Controller
2015	Lydie Toison	PS	Councillor of Duran

== Pictures of the canton ==
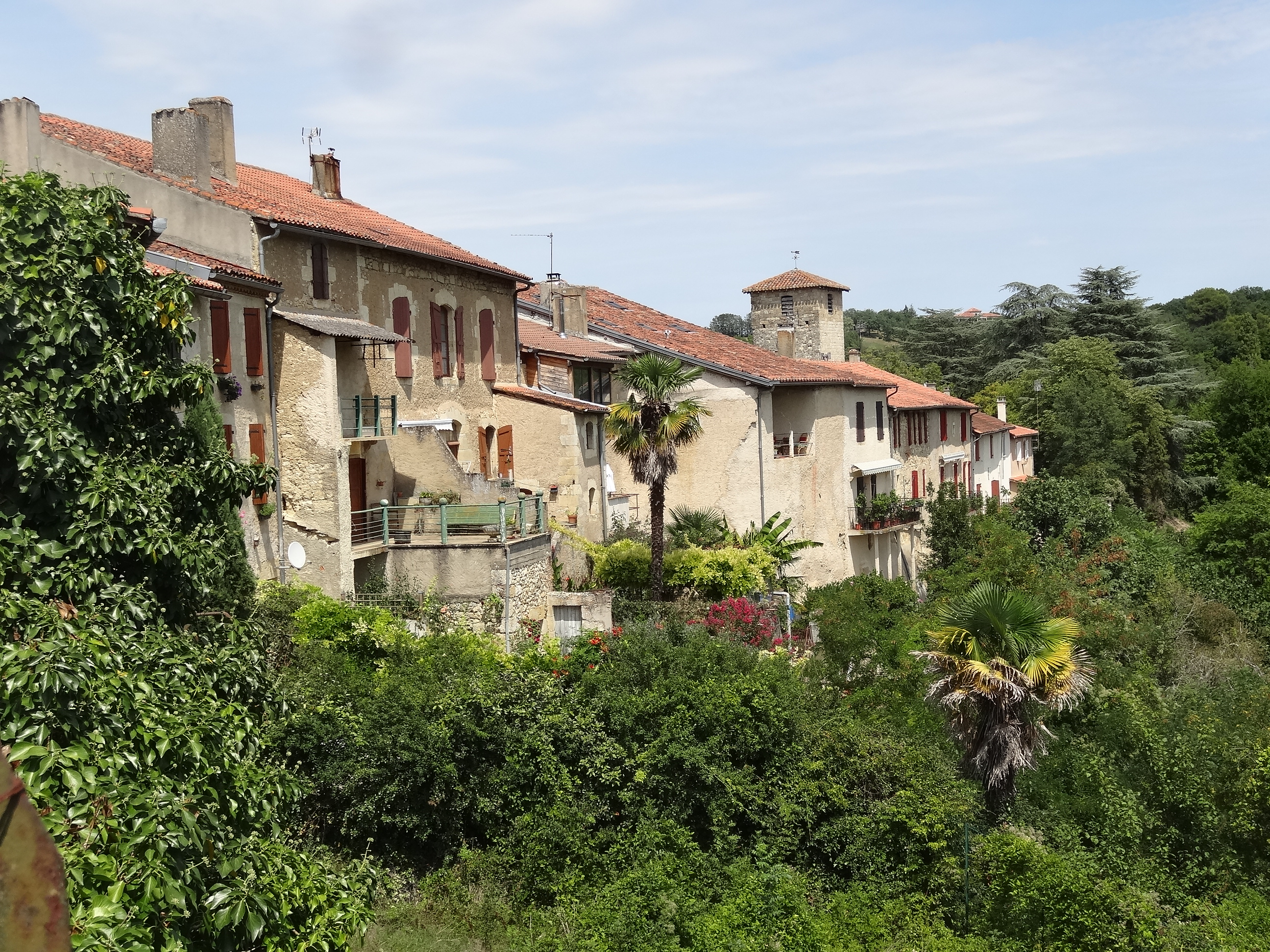
View of Biran

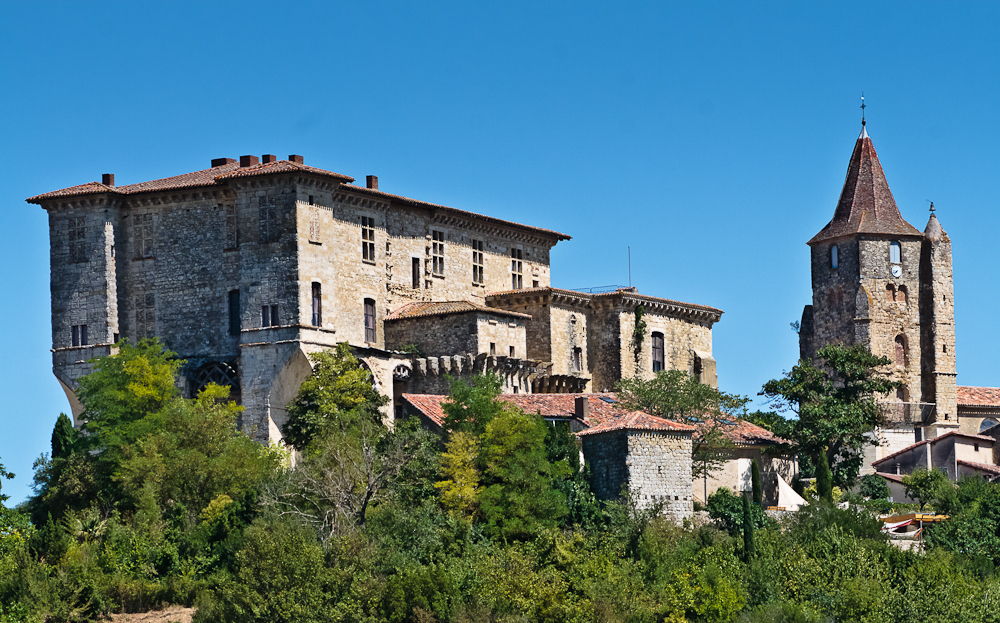
Lavardens castle

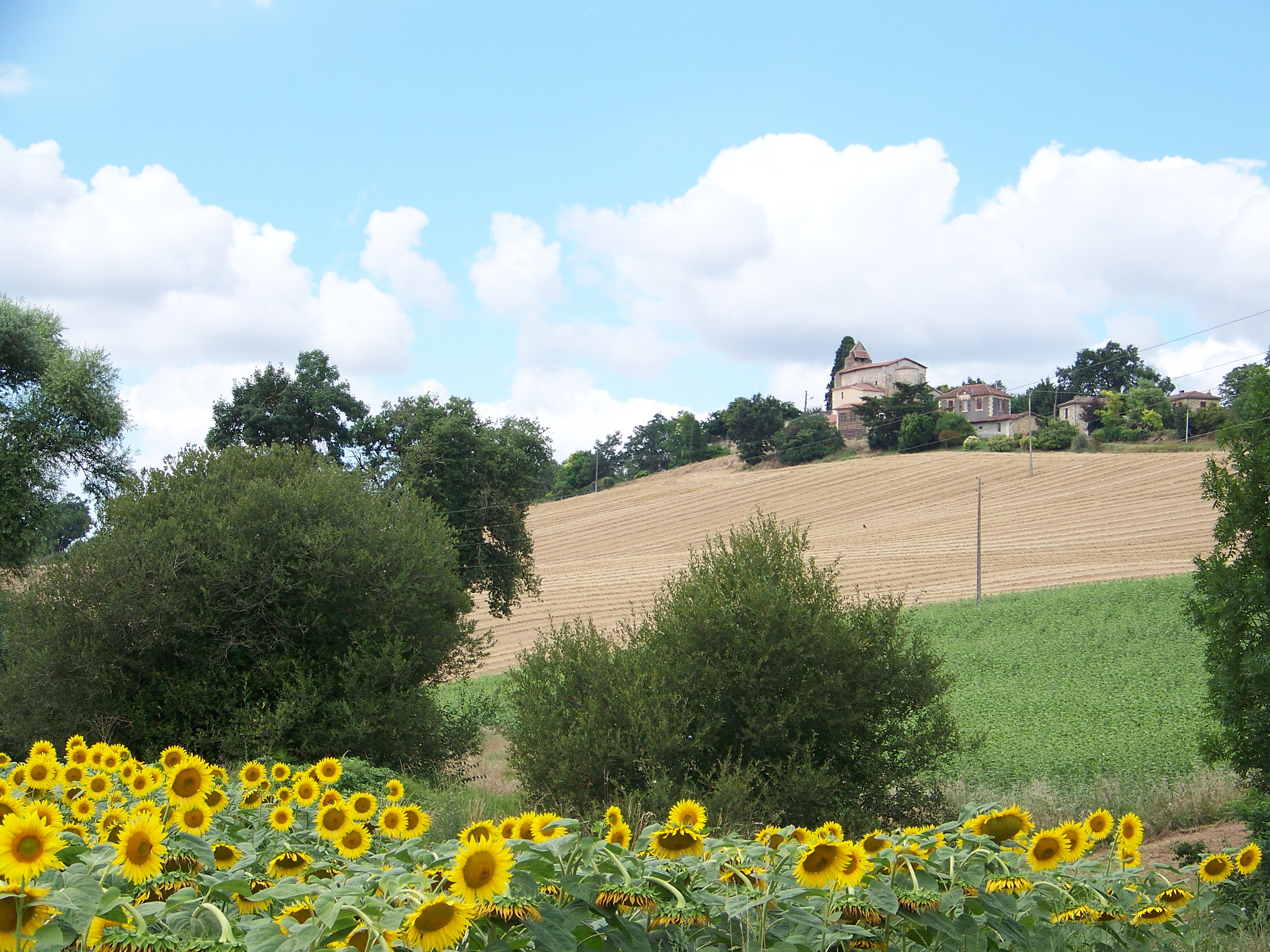
View of Mérens
