= Augnax =

- Commune
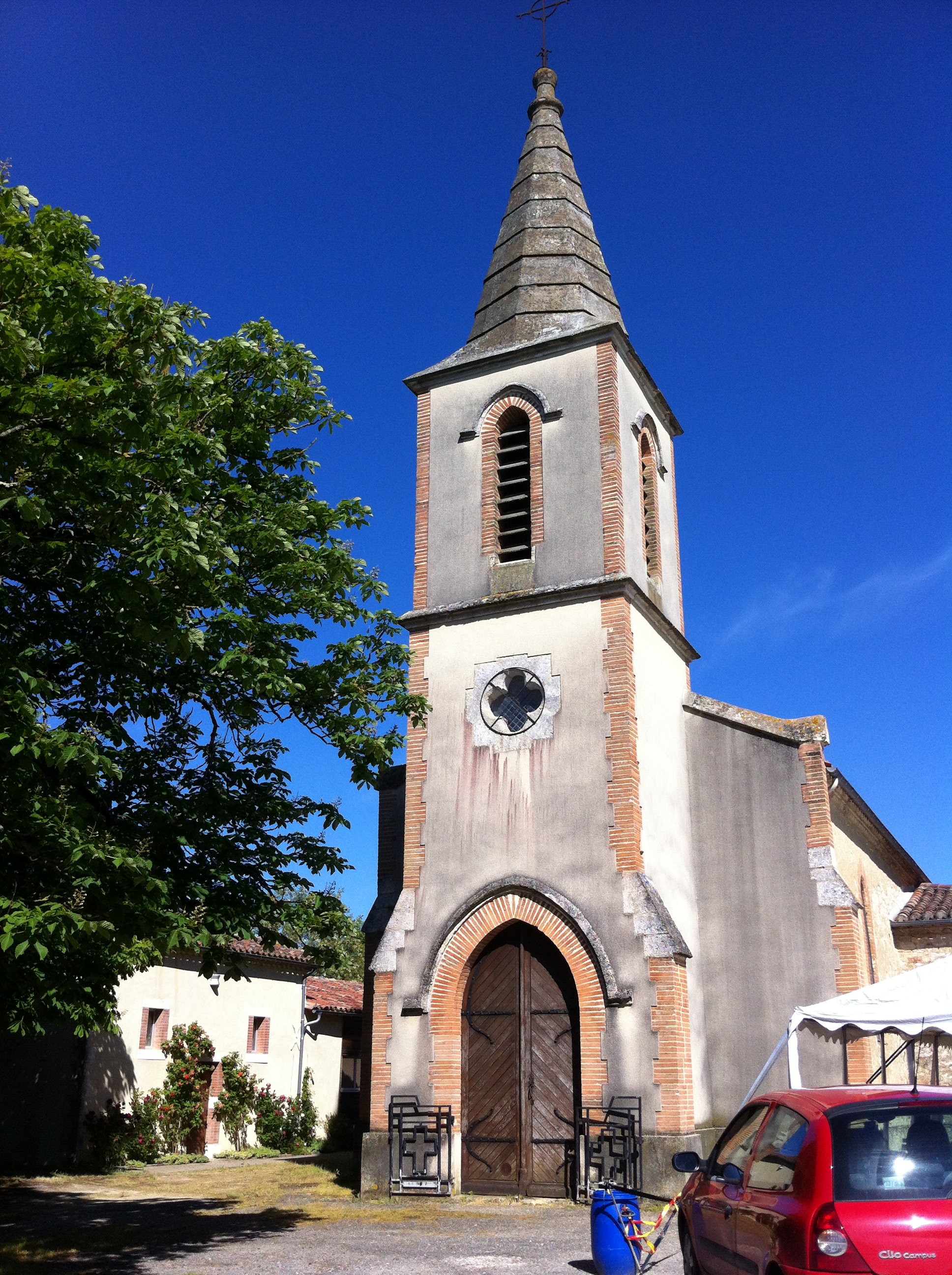
- The church in Augnax
- Location of Augnax
- Location within France Location within Occitanie
- Coordinates: 43°43′24″N 0°46′35″E
- Country: France
- Region: Occitania
- Department: Gers
- Arrondissement: Auch
- Canton: Gascogne-Auscitaine
- Intercommunality: CA Grand Auch Cœur Gascogne

Government
  - Mayor (2020–2026): Claude Petit
- Area^{1}: 4 km^{2} (1.5 sq mi)
- Elevation: 202 m (663 ft)
- Highest elevation: 213 m (699 ft)
- Lowest elevation: 150 m (490 ft)
- Population (2023): 132
  - Density: 33/km^{2} (85/sq mi)
- Time zone: UTC+01:00 (CET)
  - Summer (DST): UTC+02:00 (CEST)
- INSEE/Postal code: 32014 /32120
- ^{1} French Land Register data, which excludes lakes, ponds, glaciers > 1 km^{2} (0.386 sq mi or 247 acres) and river estuaries.

Augnax is a commune in the Gers department in southwestern France.

== Geography ==
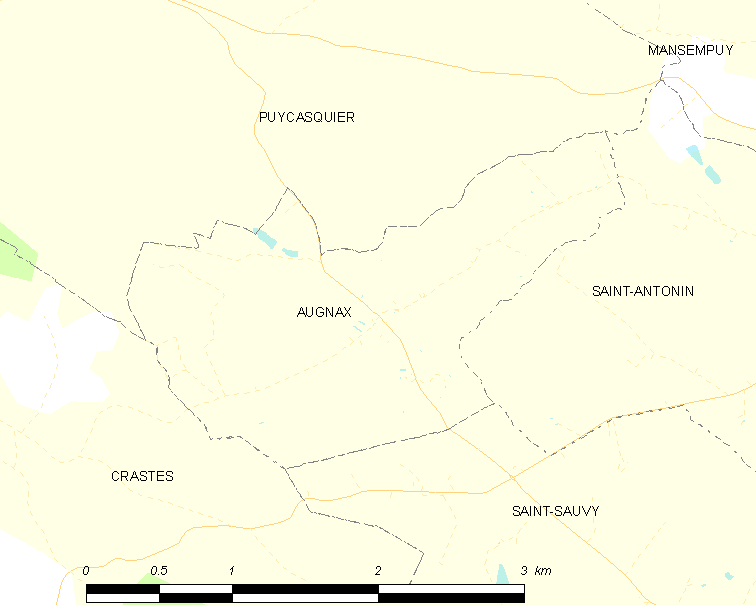
Augnax and its surrounding communes

== Population ==
Historical population
Year	Pop.	±% p.a.
1968	72	—
1975	66	−1.24%
1982	54	−2.83%
1990	63	+1.95%
1999	56	−1.30%
2007	78	+4.23%
2012	97	+4.46%
2017	109	+2.36%
2023	132	+3.24%
Source: INSEE

== See also ==
- Communes of the Gers department
