= Tourrenquets =

- Commune
- Location of Tourrenquets
- Location within France Location within Occitanie
- Coordinates: 43°45′15″N 0°41′32″E
- Country: France
- Region: Occitania
- Department: Gers
- Arrondissement: Auch
- Canton: Gascogne-Auscitaine
- Intercommunality: CA Grand Auch Cœur Gascogne

Government
  - Mayor (2020–2026): Denis Perusin
- Area^{1}: 7.12 km^{2} (2.75 sq mi)
- Highest elevation: 224 m (735 ft)
- Lowest elevation: 135 m (443 ft)
- Population (2023): 99
  - Density: 14/km^{2} (36/sq mi)
- Time zone: UTC+01:00 (CET)
  - Summer (DST): UTC+02:00 (CEST)
- INSEE/Postal code: 32453 /32390
- ^{1} French Land Register data, which excludes lakes, ponds, glaciers > 1 km^{2} (0.386 sq mi or 247 acres) and river estuaries.

Tourrenquets (French pronunciation: [tuʁɛ̃kɛ]) is a commune in the Gers department in southwestern France.

== Geography ==
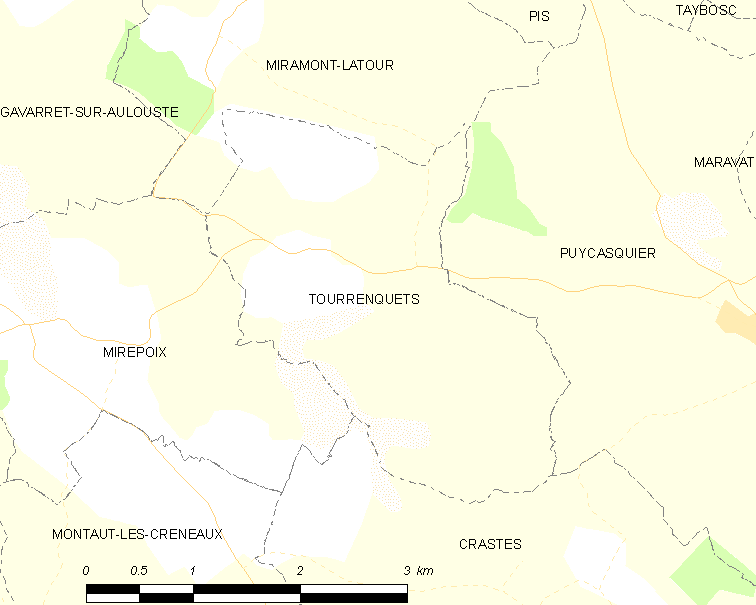
Tourrenquets and its surrounding communes

== Population ==
Historical population
Year	Pop.	±% p.a.
1968	141	—
1975	120	−2.28%
1982	126	+0.70%
1990	102	−2.61%
1999	117	+1.54%
2007	125	+0.83%
2012	125	+0.00%
2017	113	−2.00%
2023	99	−2.18%
Source: INSEE

== See also ==
- Communes of the Gers department
