= Antras, Gers =

Antras
- Commune
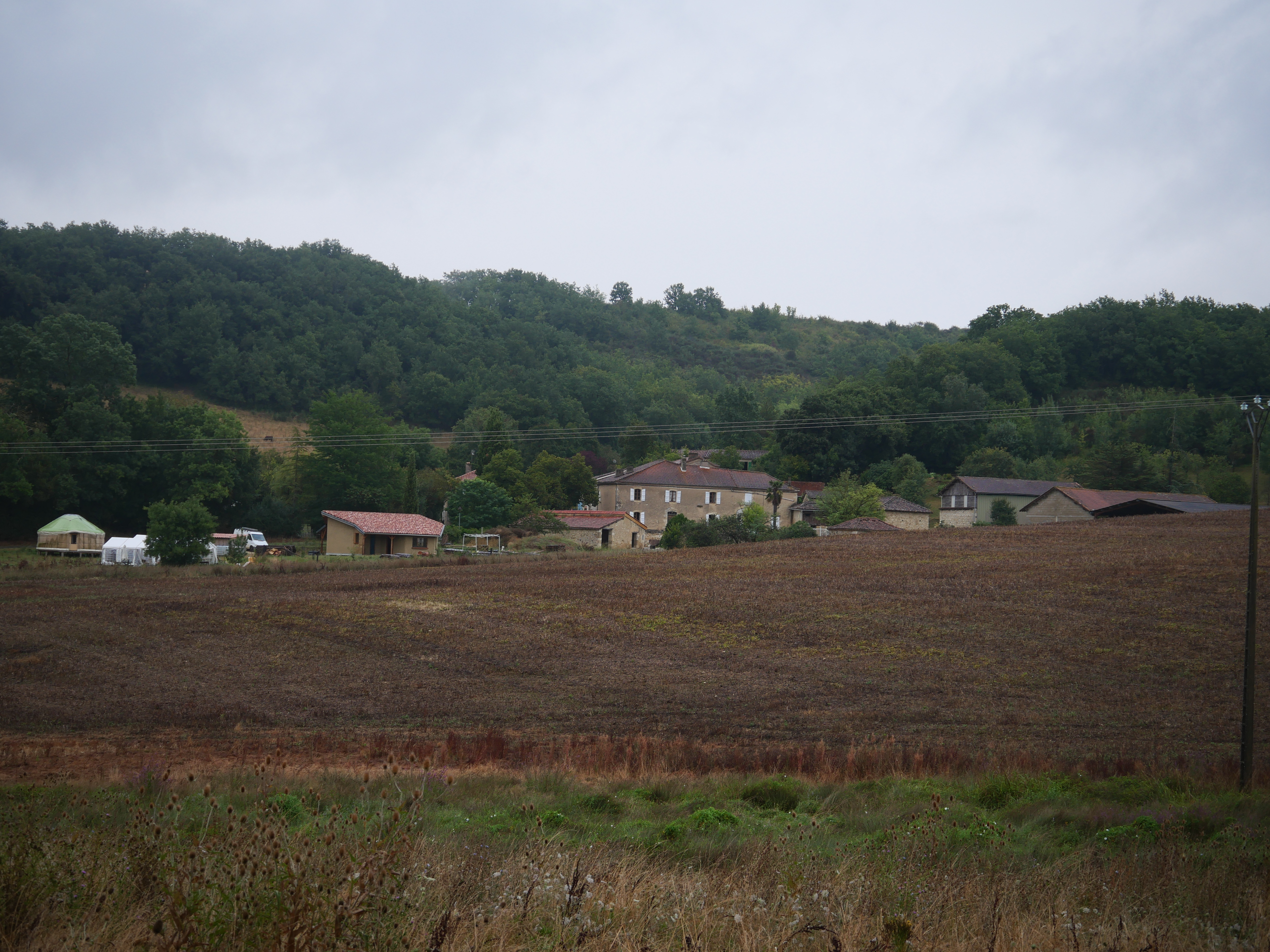
- Antras
- Location of Antras
- Location within France Location within Occitanie
- Coordinates: 43°43′49″N 0°26′55″E
- Country: France
- Region: Occitania
- Department: Gers
- Arrondissement: Auch
- Canton: Gascogne-Auscitaine
- Intercommunality: CA Grand Auch Cœur Gascogne

Government
  - Mayor (2020–2026): Olivier Souard
- Area^{1}: 6.59 km^{2} (2.54 sq mi)
- Elevation: 218 m (715 ft)
- Highest elevation: 251 m (823 ft)
- Lowest elevation: 125 m (410 ft)
- Population (2023): 40
  - Density: 6.1/km^{2} (16/sq mi)
- Time zone: UTC+01:00 (CET)
  - Summer (DST): UTC+02:00 (CEST)
- INSEE/Postal code: 32003 /32360
- ^{1} French Land Register data, which excludes lakes, ponds, glaciers > 1 km^{2} (0.386 sq mi or 247 acres) and river estuaries.

Antras (Antràs in Occitan) is a commune in the Gers department in southwestern France.

== Geography ==
Antras is located in the canton of Gascogne-Auscitaine and in the arrondissement of Auch.

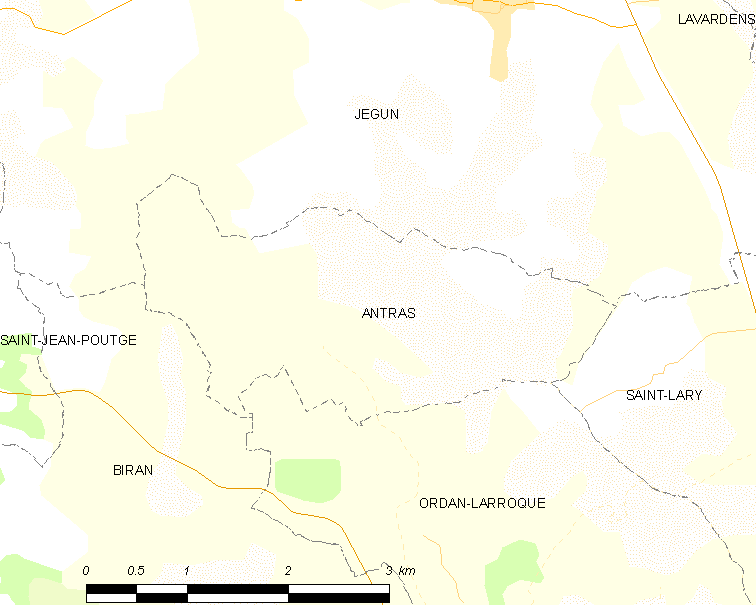
Map of Antras and its surrounding communes

== Population ==
Historical population
Year	Pop.	±% p.a.
1968	86	—
1975	49	−7.72%
1982	55	+1.66%
1990	51	−0.94%
1999	58	+1.44%
2007	61	+0.63%
2012	53	−2.77%
2017	47	−2.37%
2023	40	−2.65%
Source: INSEE

== See also ==
- Communes of the Gers department
