= Preignan =

- Commune
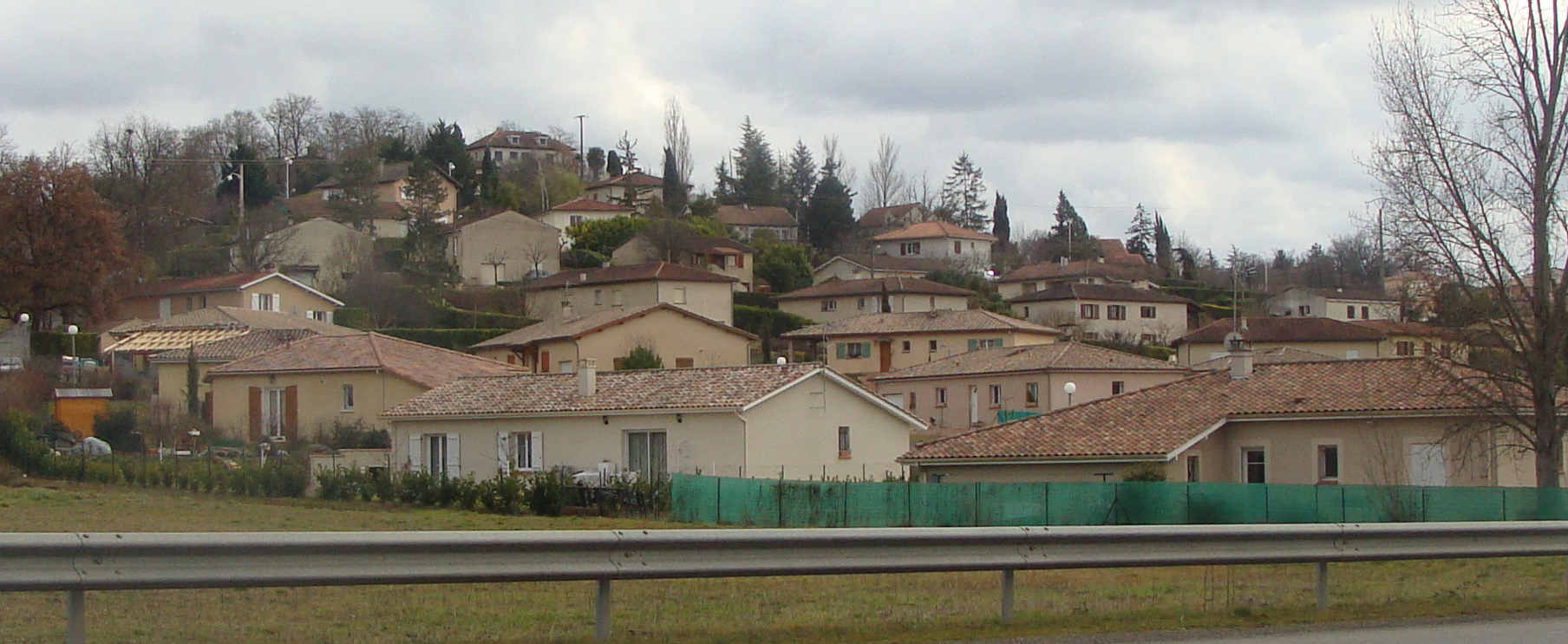
- A general view of Preignan

- Coat of arms
- Location of Preignan
- Location within France Location within Occitanie
- Coordinates: 43°42′48″N 0°37′50″E
- Country: France
- Region: Occitania
- Department: Gers
- Arrondissement: Auch
- Canton: Gascogne-Auscitaine
- Intercommunality: CA Grand Auch Cœur Gascogne

Government
  - Mayor (2023–2026): Jérôme Lasserre
- Area^{1}: 10.67 km^{2} (4.12 sq mi)
- Elevation: 158 m (518 ft)
- Highest elevation: 197 m (646 ft)
- Lowest elevation: 112 m (367 ft)
- Population (2023): 1,202
  - Density: 112.7/km^{2} (291.8/sq mi)
- Time zone: UTC+01:00 (CET)
  - Summer (DST): UTC+02:00 (CEST)
- INSEE/Postal code: 32331 /32810
- ^{1} French Land Register data, which excludes lakes, ponds, glaciers > 1 km^{2} (0.386 sq mi or 247 acres) and river estuaries.

Preignan (French pronunciation: [pʁɛɲɑ̃]; Prenhan in Gascon) is a commune in the Gers department in southwestern France.

The commune is situated on the N21 and bordered on the west by the river Gers.

== Geography ==
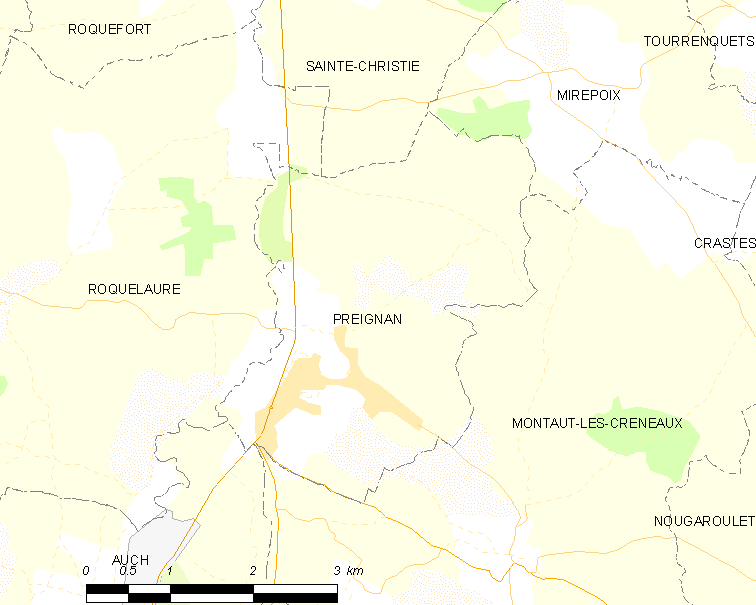
Preignan and its surrounding communes

== History ==
The origin of the name is uncertain. It may be anthroponymic, derived from either the Latin name Prineus, Premius or Priscus. The village evolved near the site of a Gallo-Roman villa in the area of La Pastissé, which existed from the 1st or 3rd century to the 5th century CE. The villa's farmlands extended south towards the stream of En Tourette covering about two hectares. During the Merovignian period, the site began to be used as a cemetery and the Romanesque Church of Saint-Étienne was built using material from the villa. A mosaic from the villa discovered at the turn of the 20th century was placed in the church.

A fortified town emerged in the High Middle Ages on the hills facing the Gers River under the auspices of a lord of Preignan. Documents attest to a family of lords existing from the 13th to 15th century, which intermarried with the lords of Montégut and Roquelaure. Vestiges of the family's fort (today, private property) remain. The Church of Saint-Étienne was remodeled in the 16th century and has a 17th-century gilded-wood retable, which was recently restored. The village is also the site of the Chartreuse du Pastissé (also private property), where Jean-Joseph Dessolles, (1767-1828) lived.

On the northern part of the commune is the hamlet of Gaudoux, a former fief and later separate commune, which was joined to Preignan in 1821. Gerald VI, the Count of Armagnac, granted the hamlet a charter (charte de coutumes) in 1276.

== Population ==
Historical population
Year	Pop.	±% p.a.
1968	183	—
1975	312	+7.92%
1982	499	+6.94%
1990	793	+5.96%
1999	961	+2.16%
2007	1,209	+2.91%
2012	1,234	+0.41%
2017	1,276	+0.67%
2023	1,202	−0.99%
Source: INSEE

== International relations ==
Preignan is twinned with:

- Corral de Calatrava, Spain

== See also ==
- Communes of the Gers department
