= Roquefort, Gers =

Roquefort
- Commune
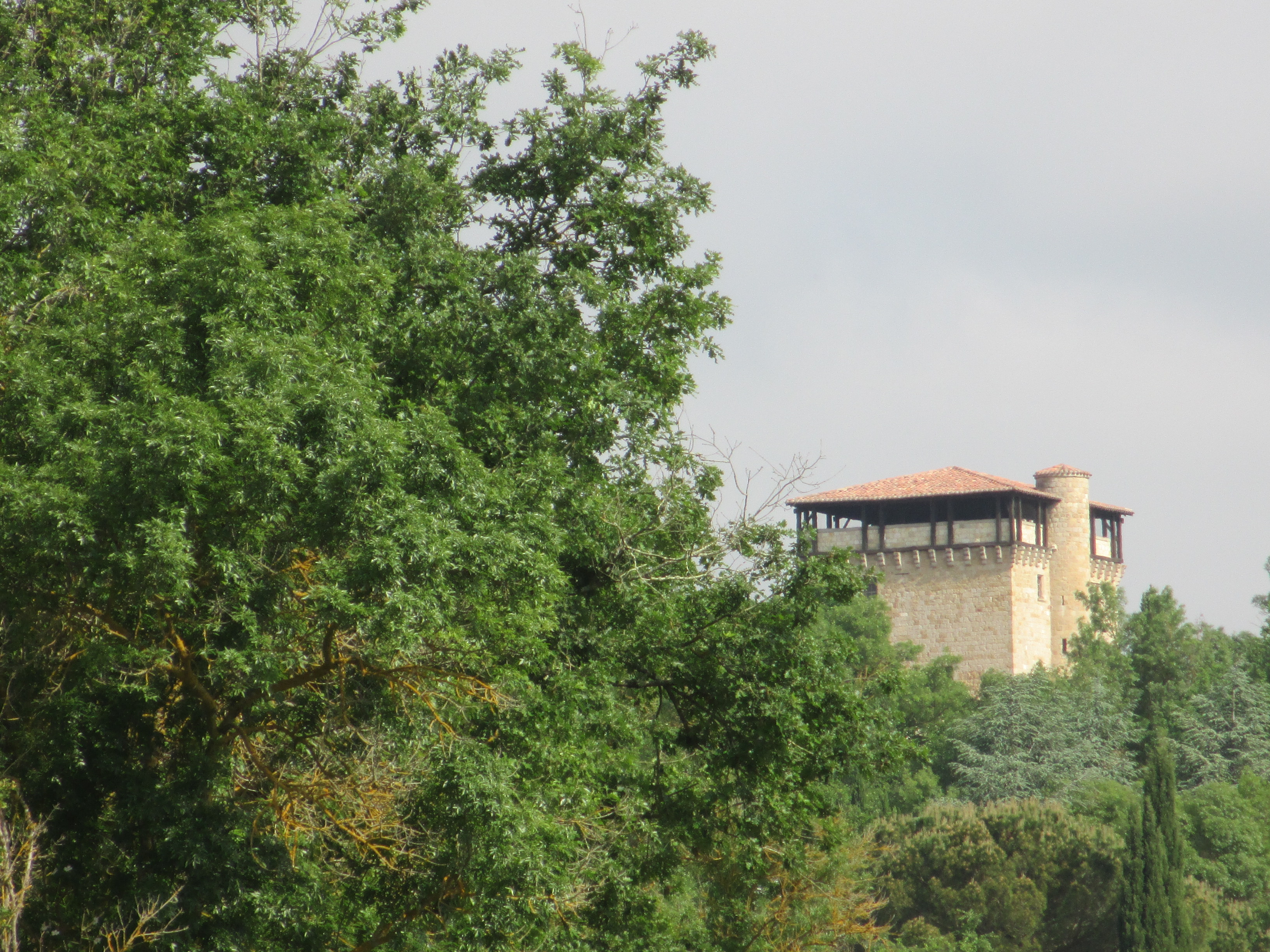
- Location of Roquefort
- Location within France Location within Occitanie
- Coordinates: 43°45′33″N 0°36′13″E
- Country: France
- Region: Occitania
- Department: Gers
- Arrondissement: Auch
- Canton: Gascogne-Auscitaine
- Intercommunality: CA Grand Auch Cœur Gascogne

Government
  - Mayor (2020–2026): Daniel Menon
- Area^{1}: 7.21 km^{2} (2.78 sq mi)
- Elevation: 158 m (518 ft)
- Highest elevation: 182 m (597 ft)
- Lowest elevation: 103 m (338 ft)
- Population (2023): 275
  - Density: 38.1/km^{2} (98.8/sq mi)
- Time zone: UTC+01:00 (CET)
  - Summer (DST): UTC+02:00 (CEST)
- INSEE/Postal code: 32347 /32390
- ^{1} French Land Register data, which excludes lakes, ponds, glaciers > 1 km^{2} (0.386 sq mi or 247 acres) and river estuaries.

Roquefort (French pronunciation: [ʁɔkfɔʁ]; Occitan: Ròcahòrt) is a commune in the Gers department in southwestern France.

== Geography ==
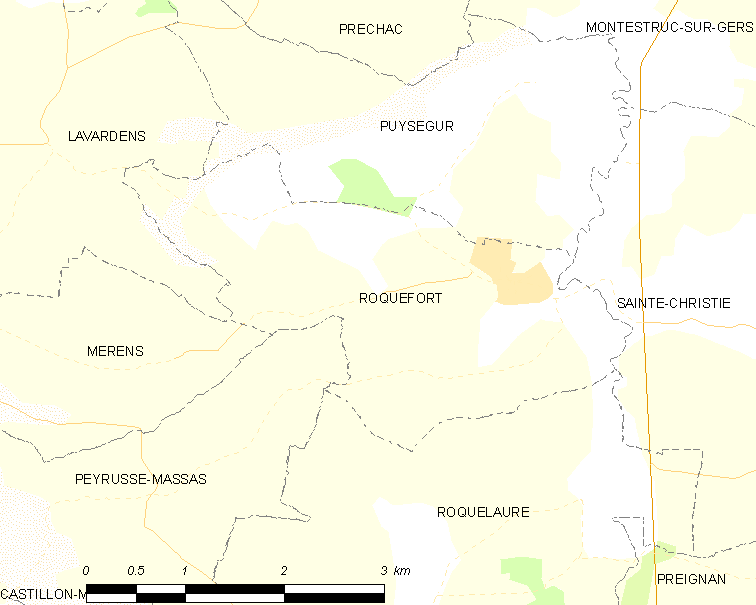
Roquefort and its surrounding communes

== Population ==
Historical population
Year	Pop.	±% p.a.
1968	140	—
1975	102	−4.42%
1982	175	+8.02%
1990	222	+3.02%
1999	230	+0.39%
2007	246	+0.84%
2012	268	+1.73%
2017	296	+2.01%
2023	275	−1.22%
Source: INSEE

== See also ==
- Communes of the Gers department
