= Jegun =

- Commune
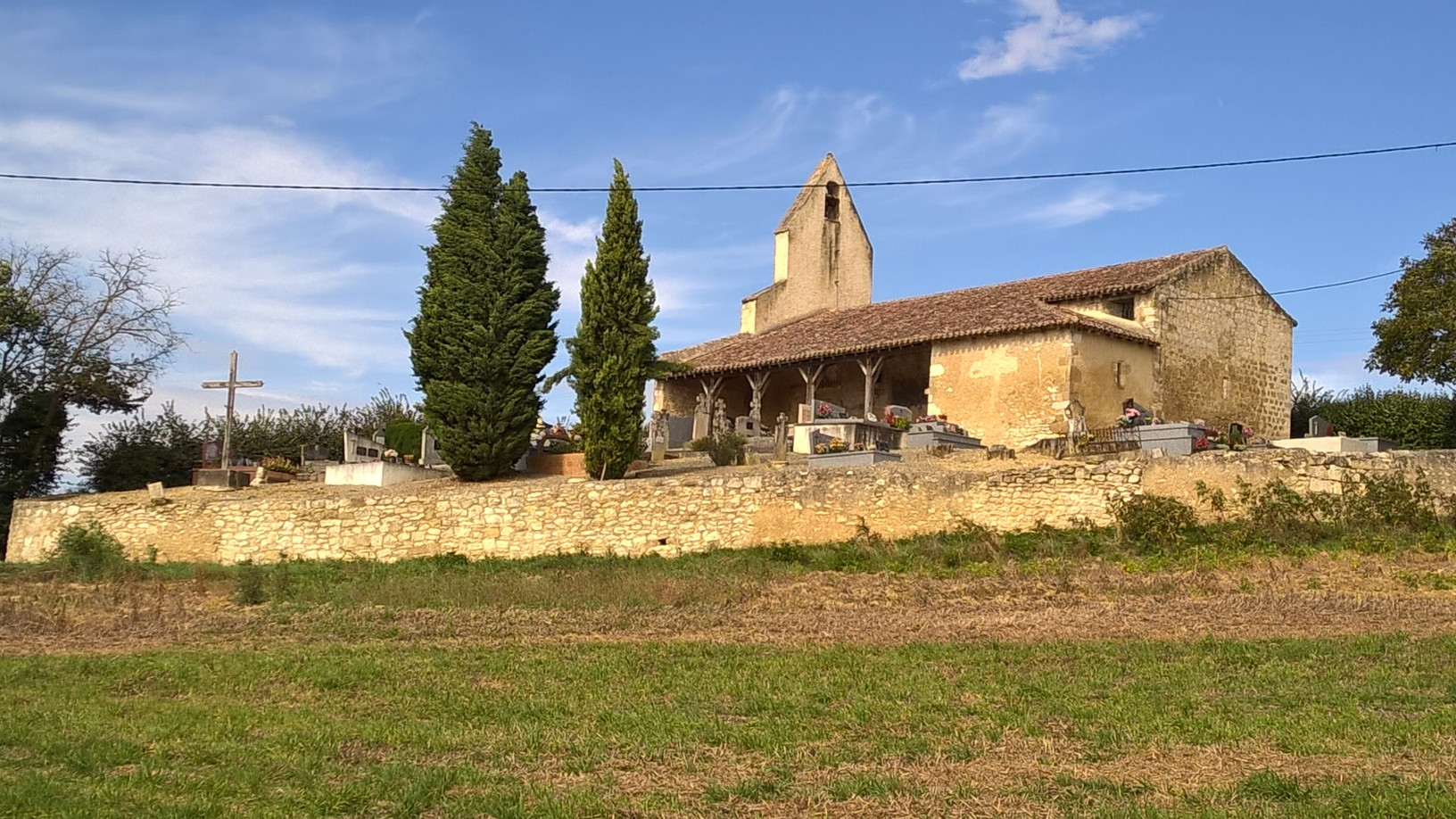
- The listed rural chapel of St Michel

- Coat of arms
- Location of Jegun
- Location within France Location within Occitanie
- Coordinates: 43°45′29″N 0°27′37″E
- Country: France
- Region: Occitania
- Department: Gers
- Arrondissement: Auch
- Canton: Gascogne-Auscitaine
- Intercommunality: CA Grand Auch Cœur Gascogne

Government
  - Mayor (2020–2026): Guy Lapeyre
- Area^{1}: 39.25 km^{2} (15.15 sq mi)
- Elevation: 220 m (720 ft)
- Highest elevation: 242 m (794 ft)
- Lowest elevation: 105 m (344 ft)
- Population (2023): 1,176
  - Density: 29.96/km^{2} (77.60/sq mi)
- Time zone: UTC+01:00 (CET)
  - Summer (DST): UTC+02:00 (CEST)
- INSEE/Postal code: 32162 /32360
- ^{1} French Land Register data, which excludes lakes, ponds, glaciers > 1 km^{2} (0.386 sq mi or 247 acres) and river estuaries.

Jegun (French pronunciation: [ʒeɡœ̃], Jégun; Occitan: Jigun) is a commune in the Gers department in the Occitania region of southwestern France. It lies 17 km (11 mi) northwest of Auch and 27 km (17 mi) south of Condom.

Jegun is a rural commune with a population of 1176 as of 2023. Its inhabitants are called Jegunois or Jegunoises. Its historical motto is On craint déguin à Jeguin which translates as “in Jeguin, we fear no one”.

Historically and culturally, the commune lies in the Pays d’Auch, a grain-growing and wine-producing area. It is subject to a temperate oceanic climate which is characterized by abundant rainfall in spring, moderate rainfall in autumn, low sunshine in spring, warm summers at around 19.5 °C, light winds, frequent fog in autumn and winter, and frequent summer thunderstorms. The commune lies in the Garonne basin and is drained by the river Baïse and its tributaries.

The land use breakdown in 2018 was as follows: arable land (50.3%), mixed farmland (36.9%), meadows/pastures (11.7%), and urbanised areas (1.1%).

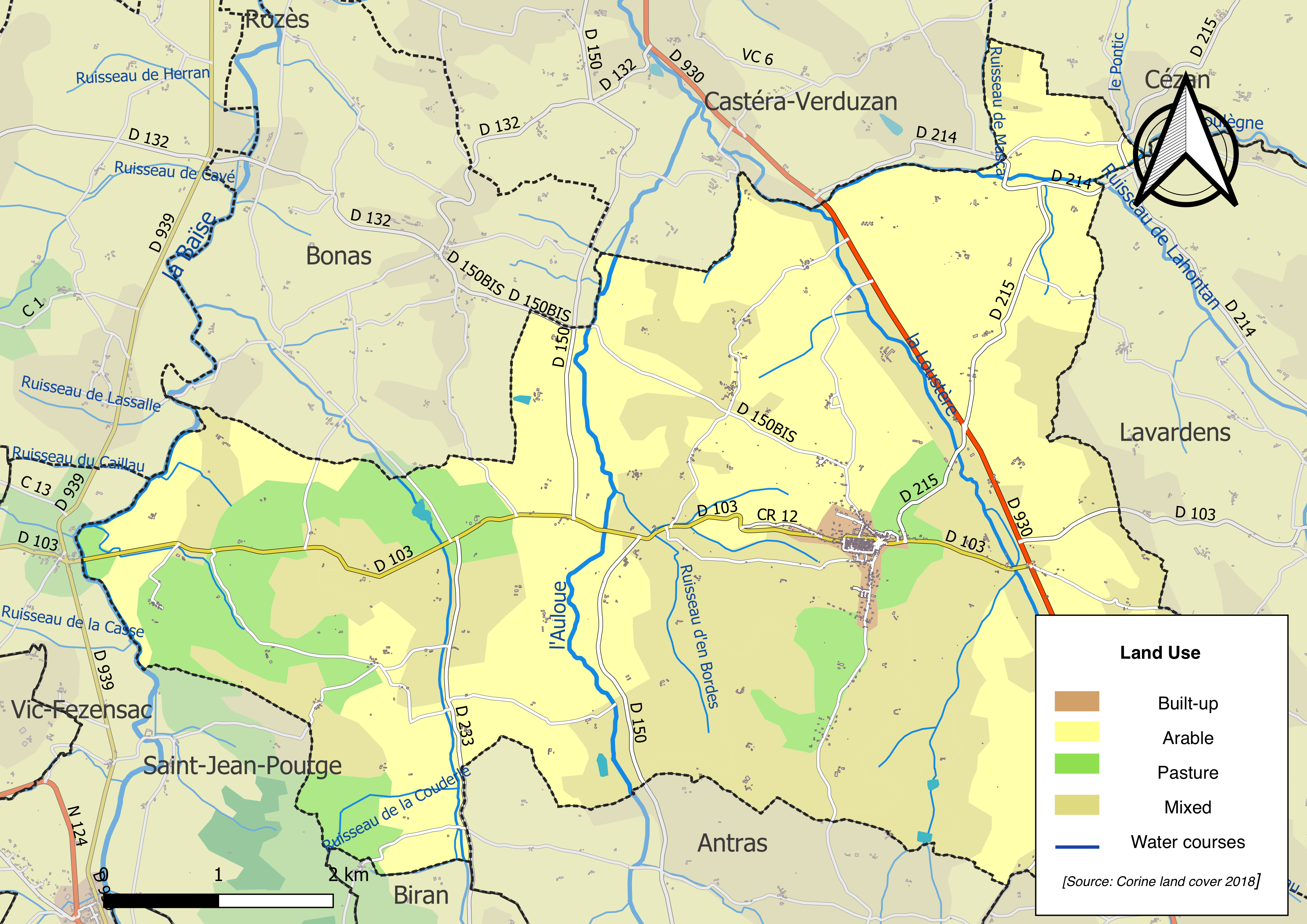

The commune's origins are poorly documented, but the town is a bastide which has a perfectly regular layout: four parallel streets running lengthwise and divided into five blocks. There is no town square, but a market hall stands in the central block. Another unusual feature is that there is no church within the bastide because the new town was inserted into an existing parish which already had a Romanesque church dedicated to Saint Candida first mentioned in a bull issued by Pope Celestine III, dating from 1193 and reconstructed from 1430 onward.

== History ==
The bastide was founded in the 11th century and fortified around 1180 by Bernard IV, count of Armagnac. During his tenure, Bernard IV was heavily involved in the regional power struggles of southwestern France, which were often complicated by overlapping Angevin and Aragonese territorial ambitions in Gascony.

In 1577, Henri de Navarre, later Henry IV of France, is said to have hidden in La Grande Rue to escape Catholic troops commanded by Honorat II of Savoy, marquis de Villars, then a royal commander in Guyenne.

Source: 'Des villages de Cassini aux communes d’aujourd’hui’ to 1968, then ‘Insee’.

== Notable buildings ==
Chapel of Saint-Michel de Tremblade is a 17th century rural chapel on the edge of a field approximately 1 mile west of Jegun and which belongs to the commune. It has a nave with a square wall at the east end topped with a bell-cot. The entrance is on the south, as is almost always the case in the vernacular religious buildings of the Gers. This is sheltered by a traditional Gascon covered porch or emban with a low wall to the south. This was where the meetings of the parish would be held.

Pigeonnier-porche de Puntis is square dovecote built over an entrance gate to a privately-owned fortified farmyard at Puntis, south of the commune, which also dates from the 17th century.

A small Church of Saint-Jean-Baptiste is located in the hamlet of Lézian, 8 km (5 mi) west of Jegun. From the late Middle Ages until the 18th century it was a parish church. The church is located away from the hamlet which has about six farms and was rebuilt during the 19th century. It features a rare painted ceiling on zinc sheets. A former presbytery and school stand nearby.

== See also ==
- Communes of the Gers department
