= Montaut-les-Créneaux =

- Commune
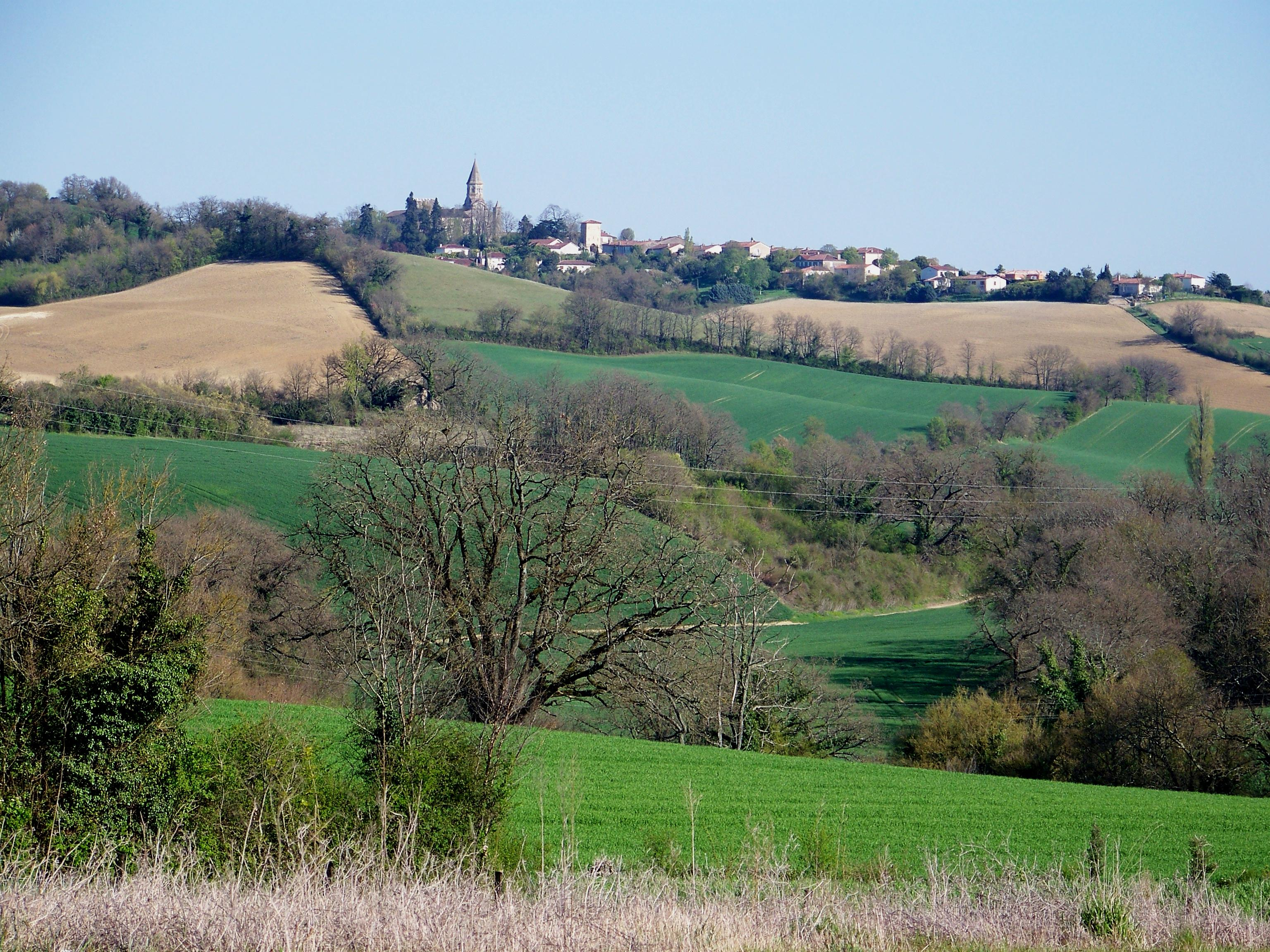
- A general view of Montaut-les-Créneaux
- Location of Montaut-les-Créneaux
- Location within France Location within Occitanie
- Coordinates: 43°41′41″N 0°39′31″E
- Country: France
- Region: Occitania
- Department: Gers
- Arrondissement: Auch
- Canton: Gascogne-Auscitaine
- Intercommunality: CA Grand Auch Cœur Gascogne

Government
  - Mayor (2020–2026): Emmanuel Gallina
- Area^{1}: 26.23 km^{2} (10.13 sq mi)
- Elevation: 244 m (801 ft)
- Highest elevation: 264 m (866 ft)
- Lowest elevation: 114 m (374 ft)
- Population (2023): 697
  - Density: 26.6/km^{2} (68.8/sq mi)
- Time zone: UTC+01:00 (CET)
  - Summer (DST): UTC+02:00 (CEST)
- INSEE/Postal code: 32279 /32810
- ^{1} French Land Register data, which excludes lakes, ponds, glaciers > 1 km^{2} (0.386 sq mi or 247 acres) and river estuaries.

Montaut-les-Créneaux (French pronunciation: [mɔ̃to le kʁeno]; Occitan: Montaut) is a commune in the Gers department in southwestern France.

== Geography ==
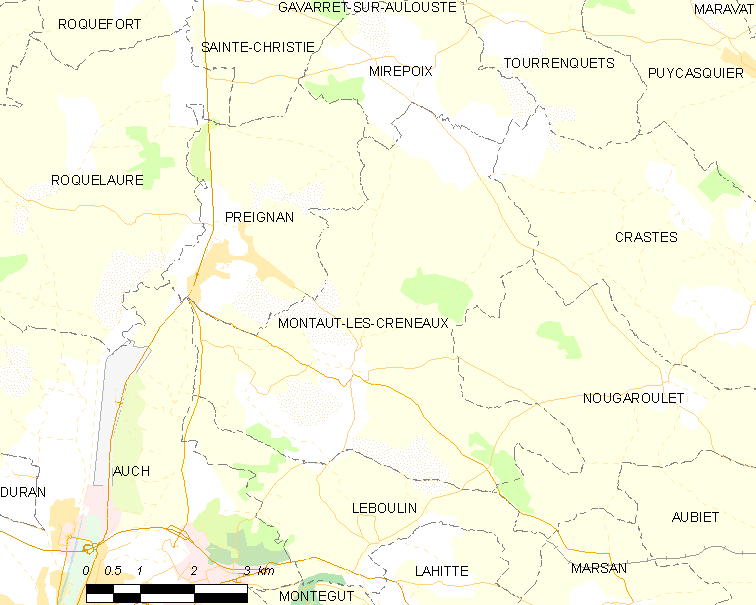
Montaut-les-Créneaux and its surrounding communes

== Population ==
Historical population
Year	Pop.	±% p.a.
1968	474	—
1975	433	−1.28%
1982	510	+2.37%
1990	612	+2.31%
1999	618	+0.11%
2007	612	−0.12%
2012	673	+1.92%
2017	708	+1.02%
2023	697	−0.26%
Source: INSEE

== History ==
Montaut is an old fortified village (or castelnau in Gascony. In the 14th and 15th centuries, the lords of Montaut were also barons of Corrensaguet. In 1821, Montaut absorbed most of the old parish of Biane, located in the northeast, on the edge of the commune of Mirepoix to which it was formerly attached. All that remains is the Sainte-Catherine church and a dovecote, which was part of the castle which is now ruined.

== Monuments ==
- The Saint-Michel church dates from the 17th and 18th centuries. The bell tower dates from the 19th century. The building has been classified as a historic monument since 1995.
- Chapel of Sainte-Catherine de Biane.
- Église Saint-Barthélemy de Malartic.
- The castle, which overlooks the north slope, is private and cannot be visited. It is its square keep with its battlements which gave its name to the commune, in 1917, to avoid confusion with the other Montaut du Gers, then called Montaut-d'Astarac.
- The houses, several of which are half-timbered, on the central street which passes under the old market hall, have also been nicely restored.

== See also ==
- Communes of the Gers department
