= Crastes =

- Commune
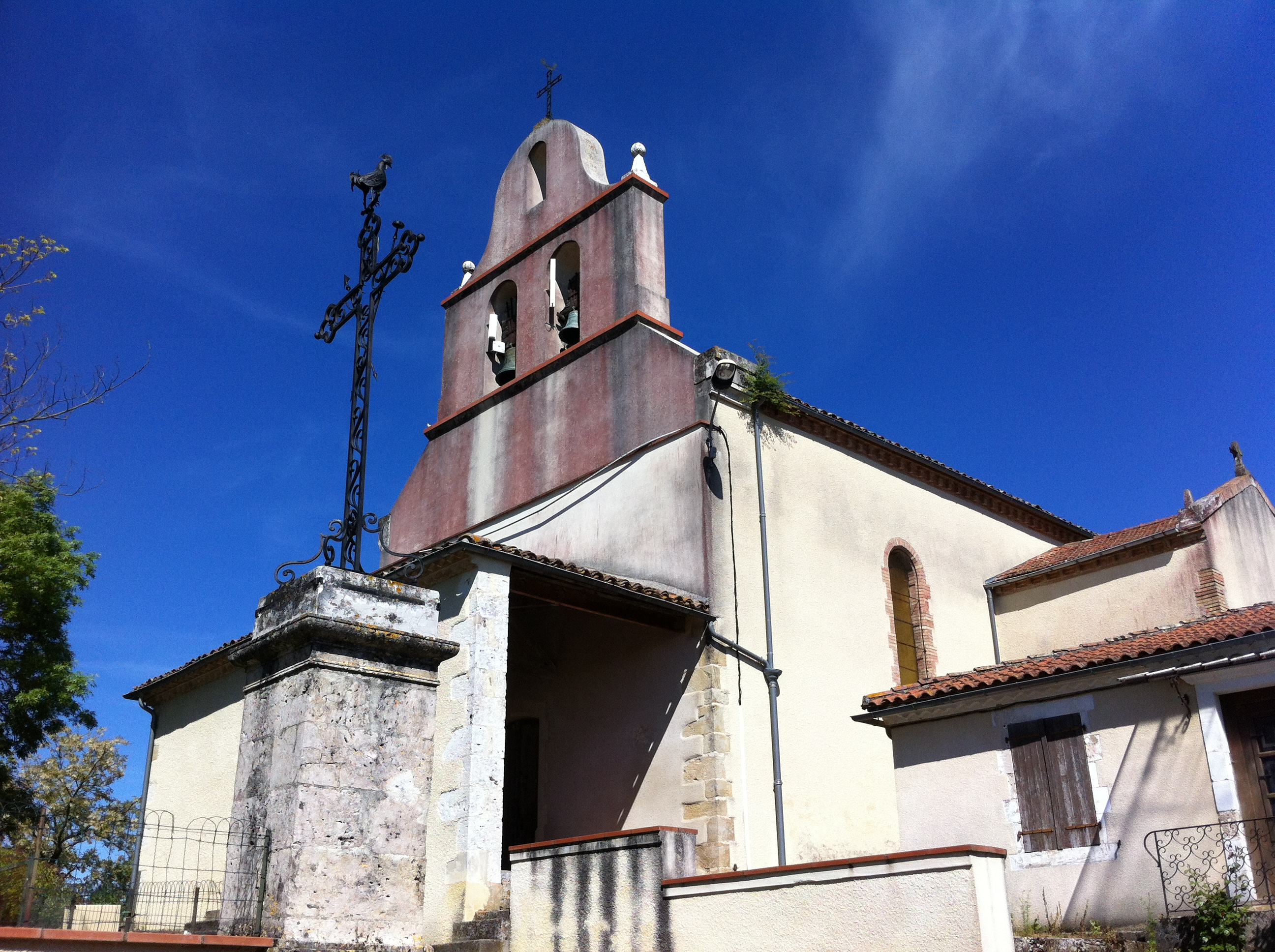
- The church in Crastes

- Coat of arms
- Location of Crastes
- Location within France Location within Occitanie
- Coordinates: 43°43′28″N 0°43′51″E
- Country: France
- Region: Occitania
- Department: Gers
- Arrondissement: Auch
- Canton: Gascogne-Auscitaine
- Intercommunality: CA Grand Auch Cœur Gascogne

Government
  - Mayor (2020–2026): Sébastien Dabasse
- Area^{1}: 19.25 km^{2} (7.43 sq mi)
- Elevation: 245 m (804 ft)
- Highest elevation: 272 m (892 ft)
- Lowest elevation: 131 m (430 ft)
- Population (2023): 264
  - Density: 13.7/km^{2} (35.5/sq mi)
- Time zone: UTC+01:00 (CET)
  - Summer (DST): UTC+02:00 (CEST)
- INSEE/Postal code: 32112 /32270
- ^{1} French Land Register data, which excludes lakes, ponds, glaciers > 1 km^{2} (0.386 sq mi or 247 acres) and river estuaries.

Crastes (French pronunciation: [kʁast]; Occitan: Crastas) is a commune in the Gers department in southwestern France.

== Geography ==
The river Auroue has its source in the commune.

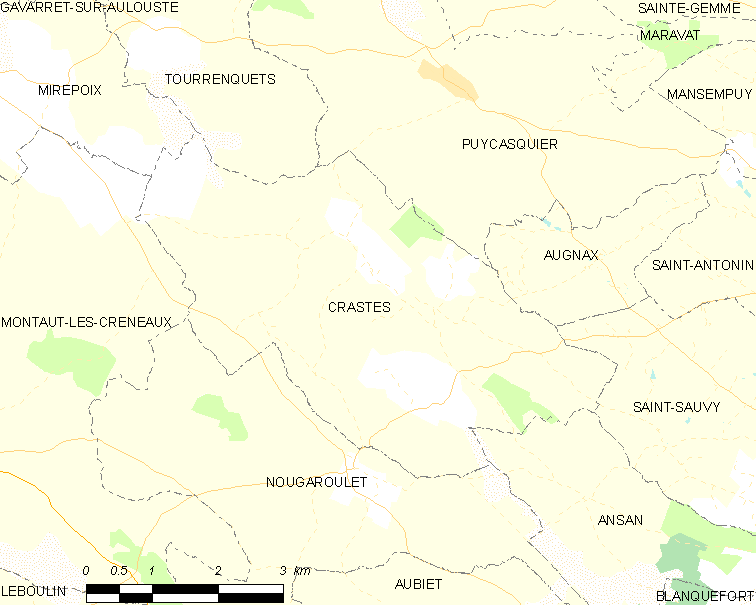
Crastes and its surrounding communes

== Population ==
Historical population
Year	Pop.	±% p.a.
1968	299	—
1975	236	−3.32%
1982	234	−0.12%
1990	221	−0.71%
1999	205	−0.83%
2007	228	+1.34%
2012	245	+1.45%
2017	254	+0.72%
2023	264	+0.65%
Source: INSEE

== See also ==
- Communes of the Gers department
