= Castillon-Massas =

- Commune
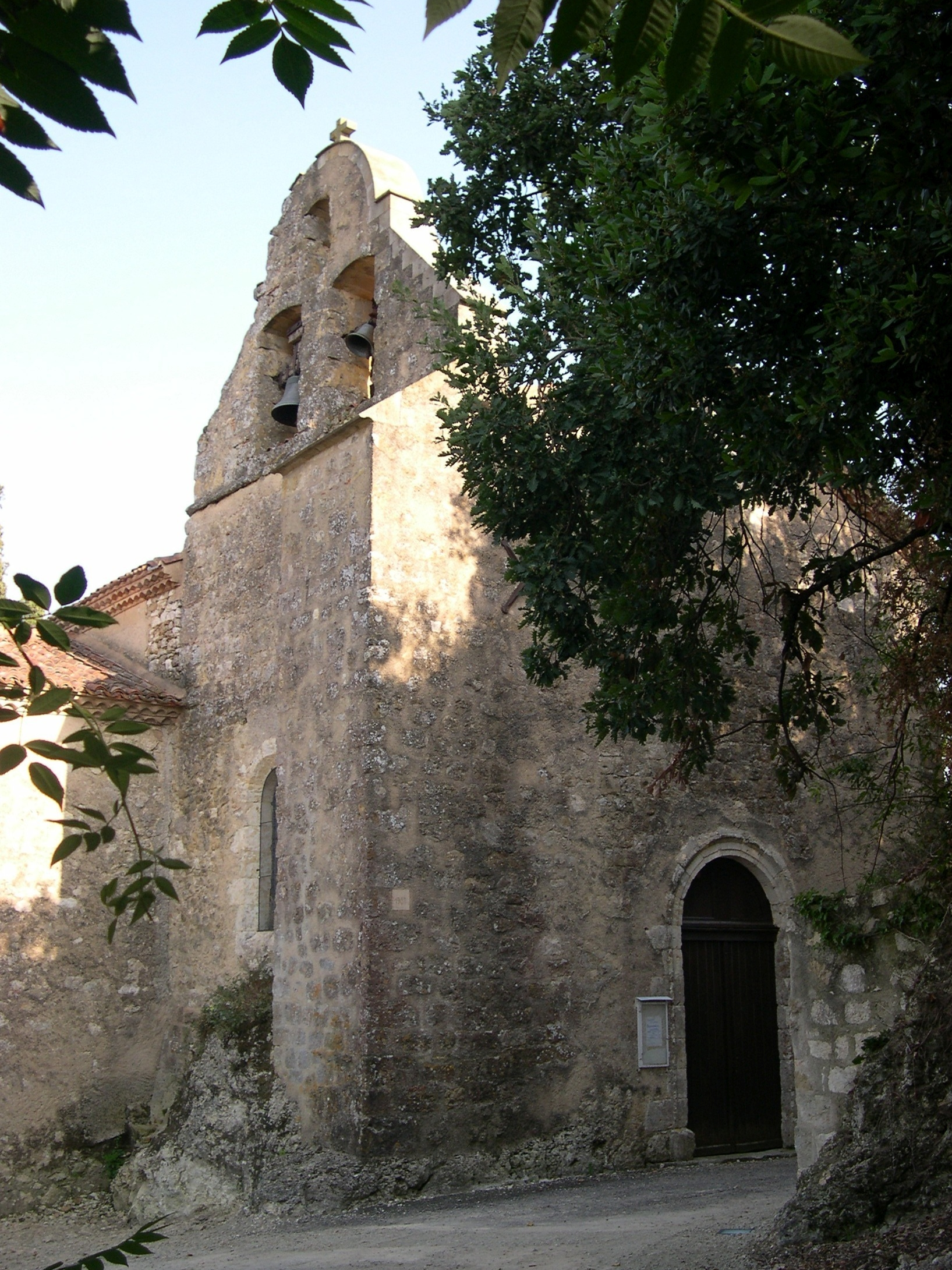
- The church in Castillon-Massas

- Coat of arms
- Location of Castillon-Massas
- Location within France Location within Occitanie
- Coordinates: 43°43′13″N 0°32′41″E
- Country: France
- Region: Occitania
- Department: Gers
- Arrondissement: Auch
- Canton: Gascogne-Auscitaine
- Intercommunality: CA Grand Auch Cœur Gascogne

Government
  - Mayor (2020–2026): Bernard Carrera
- Area^{1}: 9.59 km^{2} (3.70 sq mi)
- Elevation: 204 m (669 ft)
- Highest elevation: 264 m (866 ft)
- Lowest elevation: 136 m (446 ft)
- Population (2023): 222
  - Density: 23.1/km^{2} (60.0/sq mi)
- Time zone: UTC+01:00 (CET)
  - Summer (DST): UTC+02:00 (CEST)
- INSEE/Postal code: 32089 /32360
- ^{1} French Land Register data, which excludes lakes, ponds, glaciers > 1 km^{2} (0.386 sq mi or 247 acres) and river estuaries.

Castillon-Massas (French pronunciation: [kastijɔ̃ masas]; Occitan: Castilhon de Massàs) is a commune in the Gers department in southwestern France.

== Geography ==
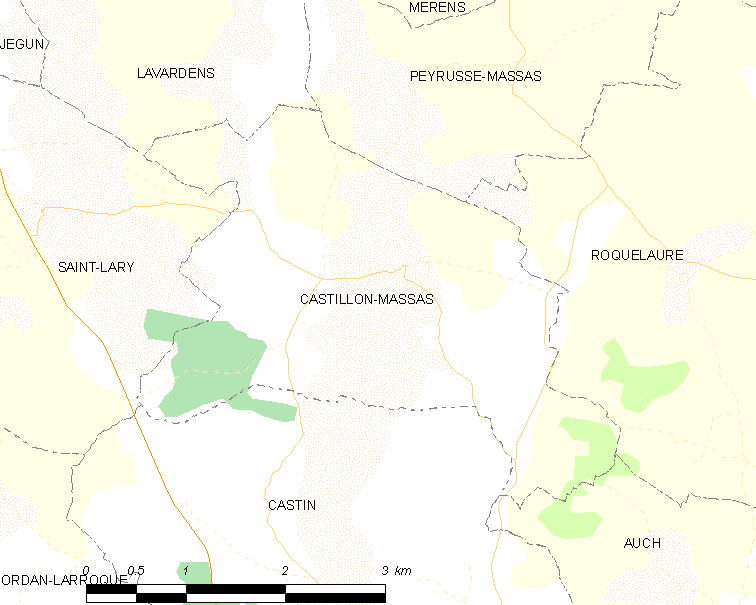
Castillon-Massas and its surrounding communes

== Population ==
Historical population
| Year | Pop. | ±% p.a. |
|---|---|---|
| 1968 | 130 | — |
| 1975 | 146 | +1.67% |
| 1982 | 169 | +2.11% |
| 1990 | 171 | +0.15% |
| 1999 | 197 | +1.59% |
| 2007 | 245 | +2.76% |
| 2012 | 251 | +0.49% |
| 2017 | 246 | −0.40% |
| 2023 | 222 | −1.70% |
Source: INSEE

== See also ==
- Communes of the Gers department
