= Communauté d'agglomération Grand Auch Cœur de Gascogne =

Grand Auch Cœur de Gascogne
- Communauté d'agglomération
- Interactive map of Grand Auch Cœur de Gascogne
- Coordinates: 43°41′N 00°35′E
- Country: France
- Region: Occitania
- Department: Gers
- No. of communes: {{{nbcomm}}}
- Established: 2017
- Area: 602.0 km^{2} (232.4 sq mi)
- Population (2019): 38,899
  - Density: 64.62/km^{2} (167.4/sq mi)
- Website: www.grandauch.com

Communauté d'agglomération Grand Auch Cœur de Gascogne is the communauté d'agglomération, an intercommunal structure, centred on the town of Auch. It is located in the Gers department, in the Occitania region, southwestern France. Created in 2017, its seat is in Auch. Its area is 602.0 km^{2}. Its population was 38,899 in 2019, of which 22,173 in Auch proper.

== Composition ==
The communauté d'agglomération consists of the following 34 communes:

1. Antras
2. Auch
3. Augnax
4. Auterive
5. Ayguetinte
6. Biran
7. Bonas
8. Castelnau-Barbarens
9. Castéra-Verduzan
10. Castillon-Massas
11. Castin
12. Crastes
13. Duran
14. Jegun
15. Lahitte
16. Lavardens
17. Leboulin
18. Mérens
19. Mirepoix
20. Montaut-les-Créneaux
21. Montégut
22. Nougaroulet
23. Ordan-Larroque
24. Pavie
25. Pessan
26. Peyrusse-Massas
27. Preignan
28. Puycasquier
29. Roquefort
30. Roquelaure
31. Sainte-Christie
32. Saint-Jean-Poutge
33. Saint-Lary
34. Tourrenquets
