= Mirepoix, Gers =

Mirepoix
- Commune
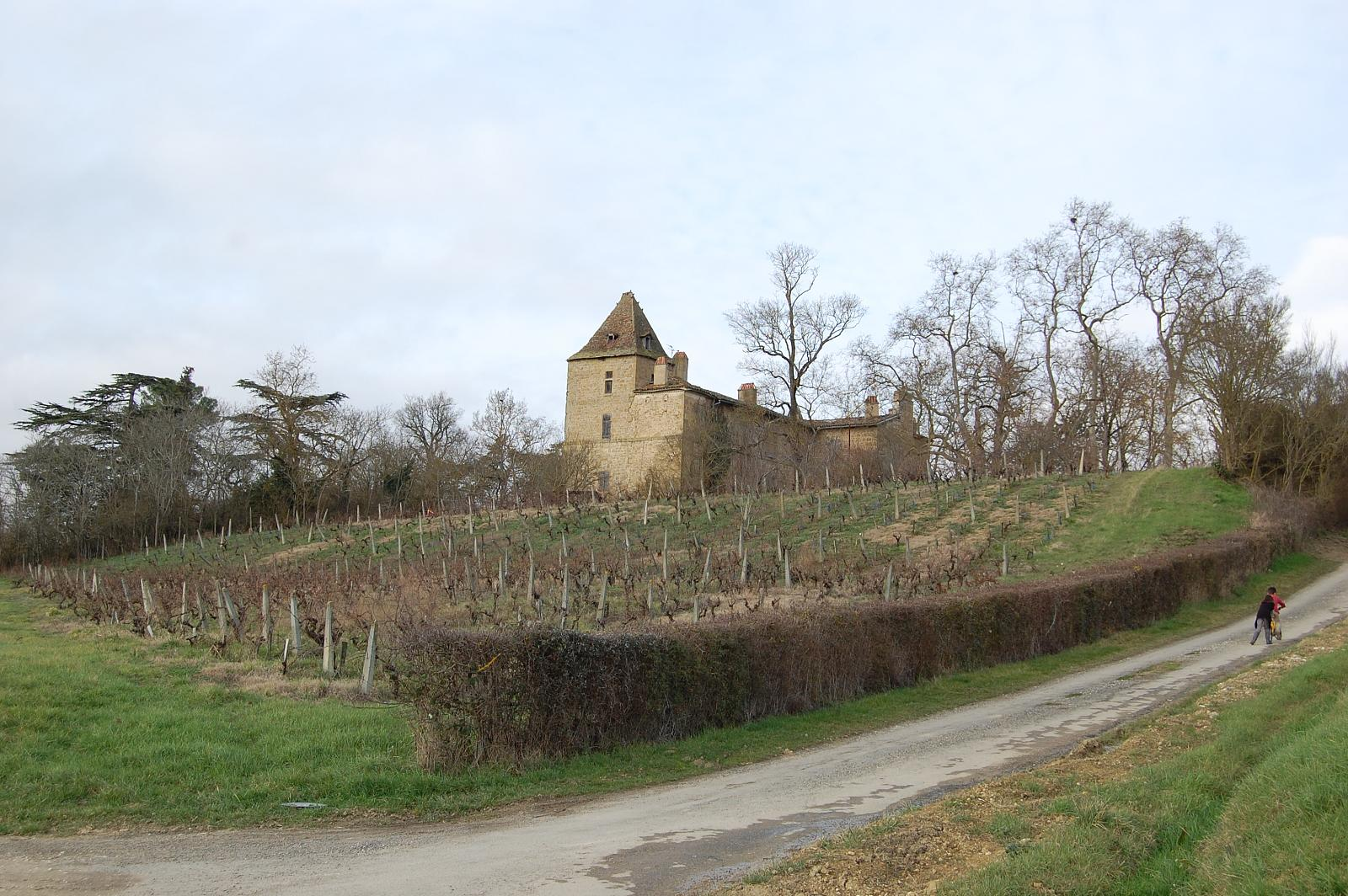
- Chateau of Reveillon in Mirepoix

- Coat of arms
- Location of Mirepoix
- Location within France Location within Occitanie
- Coordinates: 43°44′45″N 0°40′19″E
- Country: France
- Region: Occitania
- Department: Gers
- Arrondissement: Auch
- Canton: Gascogne-Auscitaine
- Intercommunality: CA Grand Auch Cœur Gascogne

Government
  - Mayor (2020–2026): Paul Esquiro
- Area^{1}: 7.25 km^{2} (2.80 sq mi)
- Elevation: 150 m (490 ft)
- Highest elevation: 201 m (659 ft)
- Lowest elevation: 115 m (377 ft)
- Population (2023): 227
  - Density: 31.3/km^{2} (81.1/sq mi)
- Time zone: UTC+01:00 (CET)
  - Summer (DST): UTC+02:00 (CEST)
- INSEE/Postal code: 32258 /32390
- ^{1} French Land Register data, which excludes lakes, ponds, glaciers > 1 km^{2} (0.386 sq mi or 247 acres) and river estuaries.

Mirepoix (French pronunciation: [miʁpwa]; Occitan: Mirapeish) is a commune in the Gers department in southwestern France.

== Geography ==
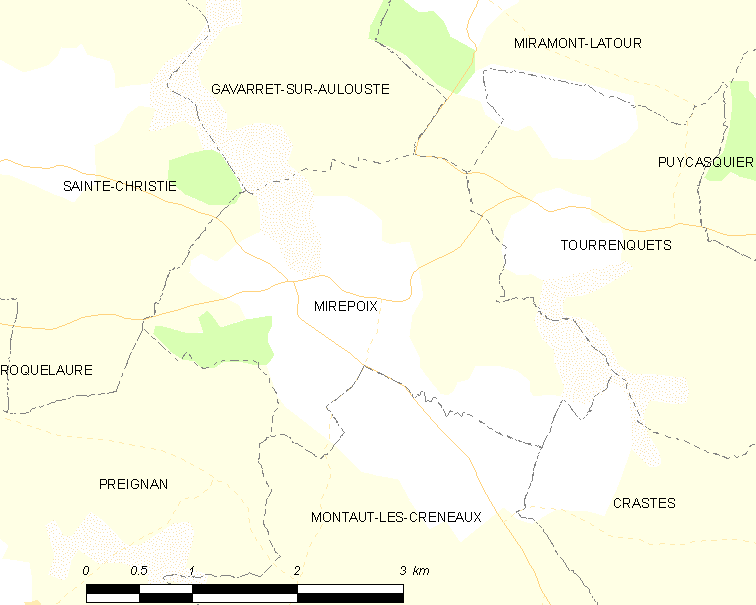
Mirepoix and its surrounding communes

== Population ==
Historical population
Year	Pop.	±% p.a.
1968	171	—
1975	154	−1.48%
1982	150	−0.38%
1990	162	+0.97%
1999	171	+0.60%
2007	191	+1.39%
2012	227	+3.51%
2017	225	−0.18%
2023	227	+0.15%
Source: INSEE

== See also ==
- Communes of the Gers department
