= Sainte-Christie =

- Commune
- Coat of arms
- Location of Sainte-Christie
- Location within France Location within Occitanie
- Coordinates: 43°45′21″N 0°38′02″E
- Country: France
- Region: Occitania
- Department: Gers
- Arrondissement: Auch
- Canton: Gascogne-Auscitaine
- Intercommunality: CA Grand Auch Cœur Gascogne

Government
  - Mayor (2020–2026): Pierre Cahuzac
- Area^{1}: 9.91 km^{2} (3.83 sq mi)
- Highest elevation: 178 m (584 ft)
- Lowest elevation: 100 m (330 ft)
- Population (2023): 541
  - Density: 54.6/km^{2} (141/sq mi)
- Time zone: UTC+01:00 (CET)
  - Summer (DST): UTC+02:00 (CEST)
- INSEE/Postal code: 32368 /32390
- ^{1} French Land Register data, which excludes lakes, ponds, glaciers > 1 km^{2} (0.386 sq mi or 247 acres) and river estuaries.

Sainte-Christie (French pronunciation: [sɛ̃t kʁisti]; Occitan: Senta Crestia) is a commune in the Gers department in southwestern France.

== Geography ==
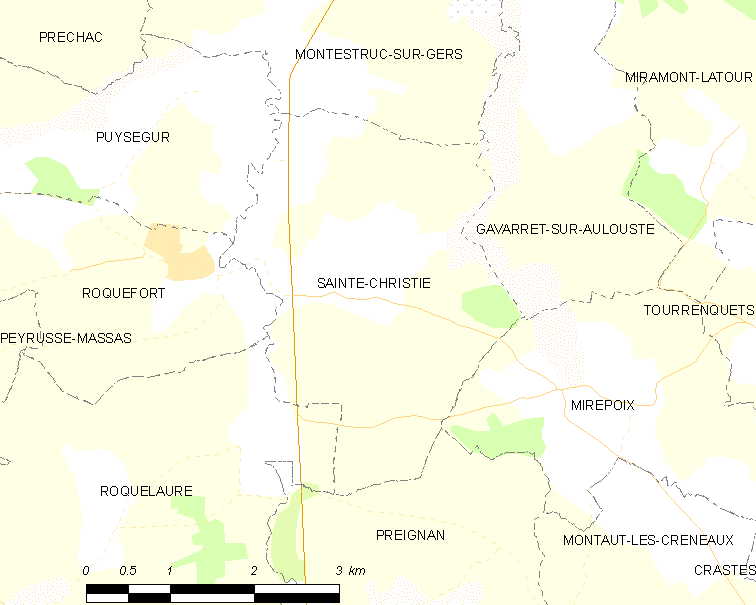
Saint-Christie and its surrounding communes

== Population ==
Historical population
Year	Pop.	±% p.a.
1968	356	—
1975	345	−0.45%
1982	325	−0.85%
1990	389	+2.27%
1999	418	+0.80%
2007	525	+2.89%
2012	564	+1.44%
2017	553	−0.39%
2023	541	−0.36%
Source: INSEE

== See also ==
- Communes of the Gers department
