= Peyrusse-Massas =

- Commune
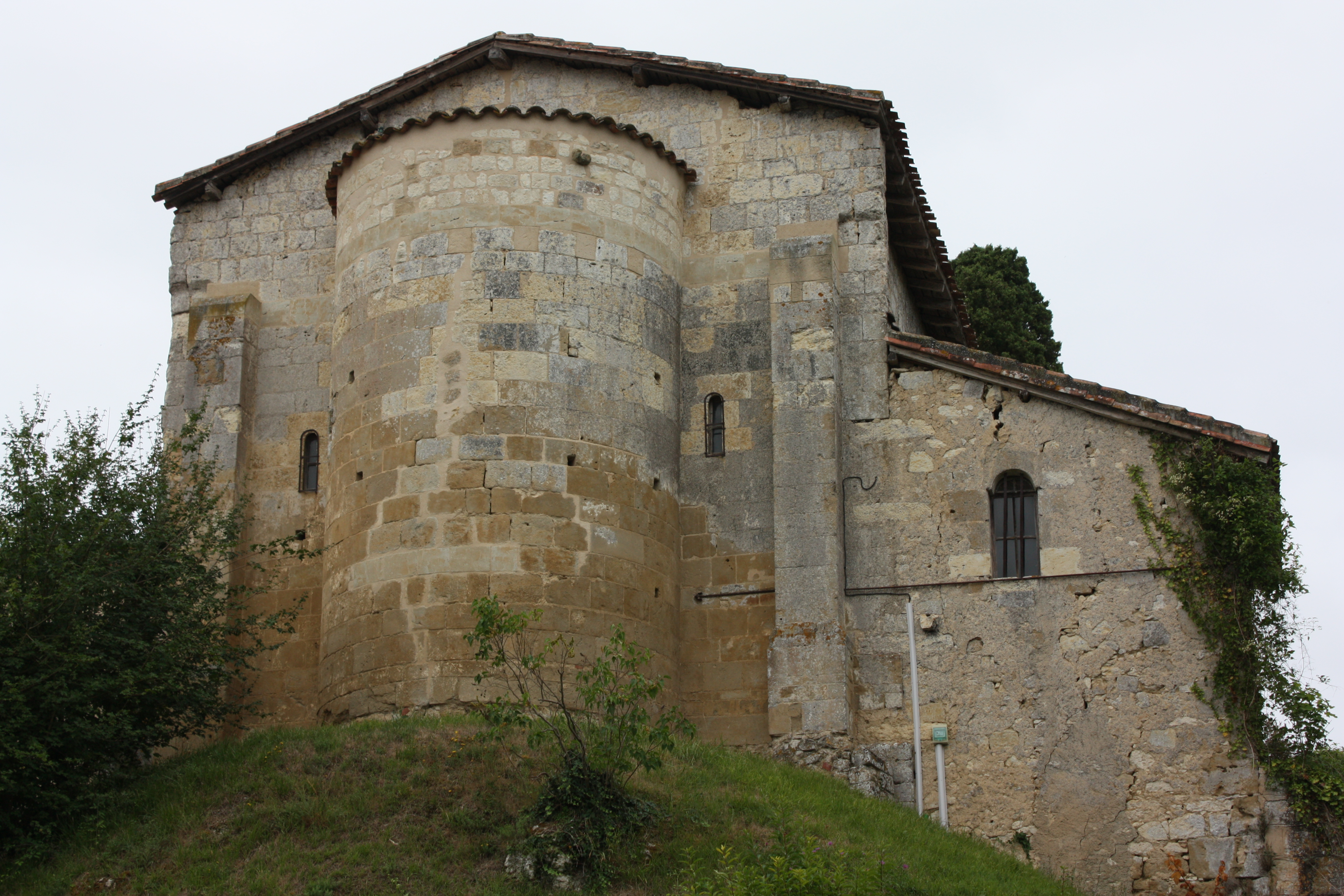
- The church in Peyrusse-Massas

- Coat of arms
- Location of Peyrusse-Massas
- Location within France Location within Occitanie
- Coordinates: 43°44′20″N 0°33′16″E
- Country: France
- Region: Occitania
- Department: Gers
- Arrondissement: Auch
- Canton: Gascogne-Auscitaine
- Intercommunality: CA Grand Auch Cœur Gascogne

Government
  - Mayor (2020–2026): Richard Pader
- Area^{1}: 6.49 km^{2} (2.51 sq mi)
- Elevation: 205 m (673 ft)
- Highest elevation: 250 m (820 ft)
- Lowest elevation: 123 m (404 ft)
- Population (2023): 117
  - Density: 18.0/km^{2} (46.7/sq mi)
- Time zone: UTC+01:00 (CET)
  - Summer (DST): UTC+02:00 (CEST)
- INSEE/Postal code: 32316 /32360
- ^{1} French Land Register data, which excludes lakes, ponds, glaciers > 1 km^{2} (0.386 sq mi or 247 acres) and river estuaries.

Peyrusse-Massas (French pronunciation: [peʁys masas]; Occitan: Peirussa de Massàs) is a commune in the Gers department in southwestern France.

== Geography ==
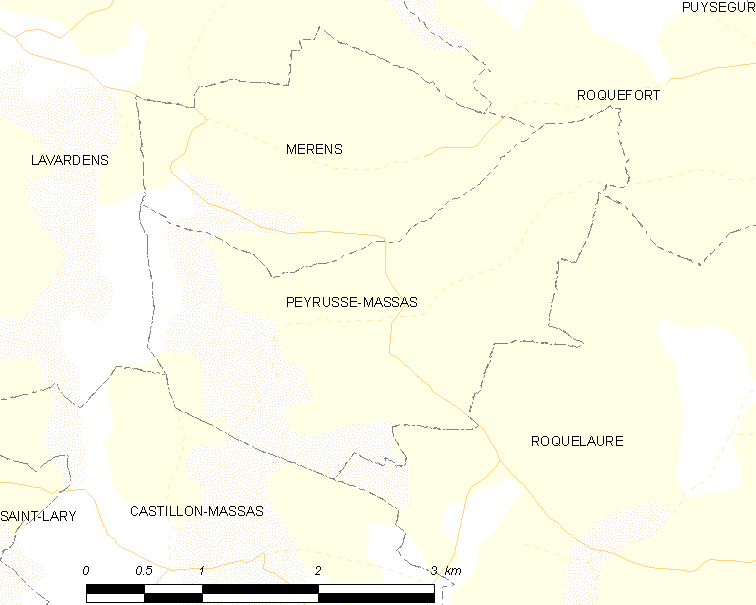
Peyrusse- Massas and its surrounding communes

== Population ==
Historical population
Year	Pop.	±% p.a.
1968	110	—
1975	76	−5.15%
1982	85	+1.61%
1990	81	−0.60%
1999	84	+0.40%
2007	104	+2.71%
2012	102	−0.39%
2017	104	+0.39%
2023	117	+1.98%
Source: INSEE

== Sights ==
- Nature et Paysages, a botanical garden specializing in carnivorous plants

== See also ==
- Communes of the Gers department
