= Biran, Gers =

Biran
- Commune
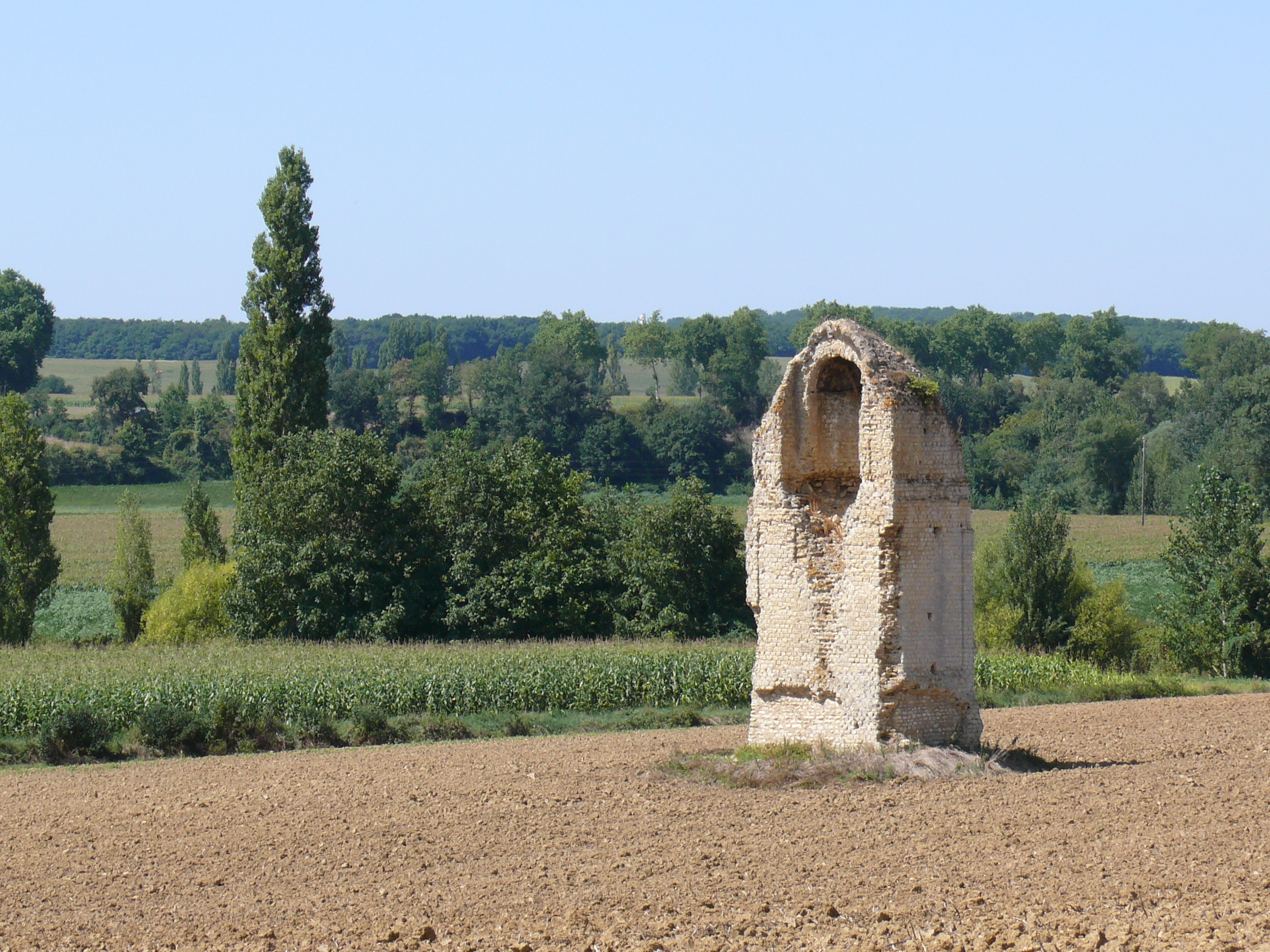
- The Gallo-Roman tower in Biran

- Coat of arms
- Location of Biran
- Location within France Location within Occitanie
- Coordinates: 43°41′49″N 0°25′09″E
- Country: France
- Region: Occitania
- Department: Gers
- Arrondissement: Auch
- Canton: Gascogne-Auscitaine
- Intercommunality: CA Grand Auch Cœur Gascogne

Government
  - Mayor (2020–2026): Patrick Delignieres
- Area^{1}: 36.86 km^{2} (14.23 sq mi)
- Elevation: 207 m (679 ft)
- Highest elevation: 253 m (830 ft)
- Lowest elevation: 105 m (344 ft)
- Population (2023): 379
  - Density: 10.3/km^{2} (26.6/sq mi)
- Time zone: UTC+01:00 (CET)
  - Summer (DST): UTC+02:00 (CEST)
- INSEE/Postal code: 32054 /32350
- ^{1} French Land Register data, which excludes lakes, ponds, glaciers > 1 km^{2} (0.386 sq mi or 247 acres) and river estuaries.

Biran (French pronunciation: [biʁɑ̃]) is a commune in the Gers department in southwestern France.

== Geography ==
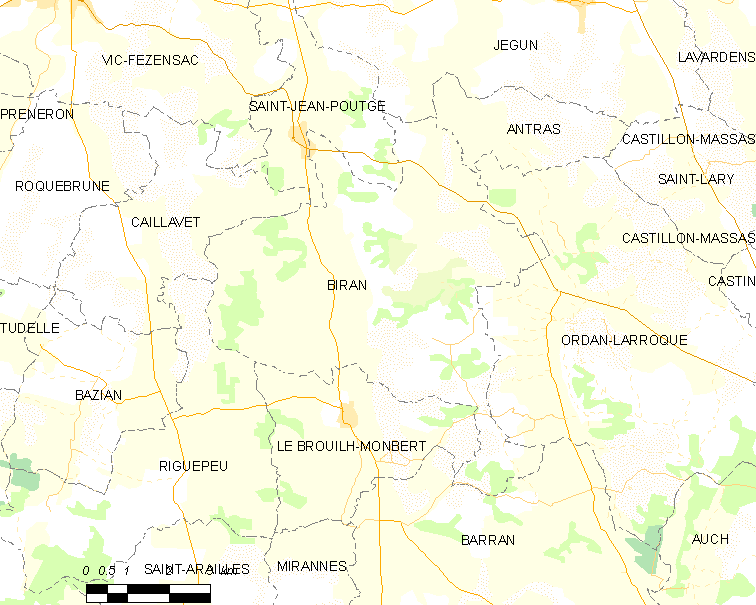
Biran and its surrounding communes

== Population ==
Historical population
Year	Pop.	±% p.a.
1968	427	—
1975	336	−3.37%
1982	372	+1.46%
1990	336	−1.26%
1999	351	+0.49%
2007	385	+1.16%
2012	391	+0.31%
2017	386	−0.26%
2023	379	−0.30%
Source: INSEE

== See also ==
- Communes of the Gers department
