= Lavardens =

- Commune
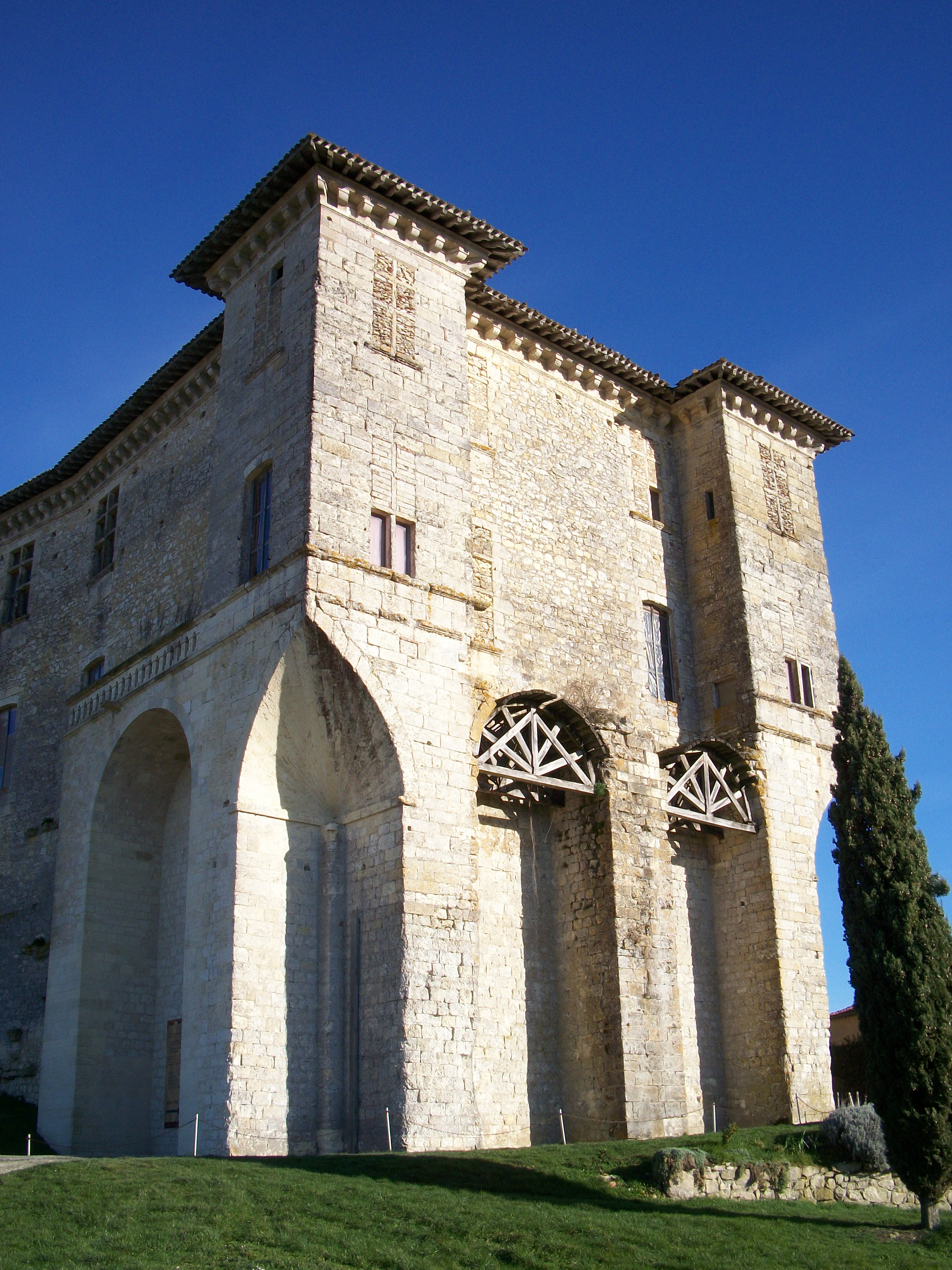
- The chateau

- Coat of arms
- Location of Lavardens
- Location within France Location within Occitanie
- Coordinates: 43°45′42″N 0°30′52″E
- Country: France
- Region: Occitania
- Department: Gers
- Arrondissement: Auch
- Canton: Gascogne-Auscitaine
- Intercommunality: CA Grand Auch Cœur Gascogne

Government
  - Mayor (2020–2026): Claude Macary
- Area^{1}: 30.55 km^{2} (11.80 sq mi)
- Elevation: 280 m (920 ft)
- Highest elevation: 245 m (804 ft)
- Lowest elevation: 126 m (413 ft)
- Population (2023): 363
  - Density: 11.9/km^{2} (30.8/sq mi)
- Time zone: UTC+01:00 (CET)
  - Summer (DST): UTC+02:00 (CEST)
- INSEE/Postal code: 32204 /32360
- ^{1} French Land Register data, which excludes lakes, ponds, glaciers > 1 km^{2} (0.386 sq mi or 247 acres) and river estuaries.

Lavardens (French pronunciation: [lavaʁdɛ̃s]; Gascon Lavardens) is a commune in the Gers department in southwestern France. It is a member of Les Plus Beaux Villages de France (The Most Beautiful Villages of France) Association.

== Geography ==
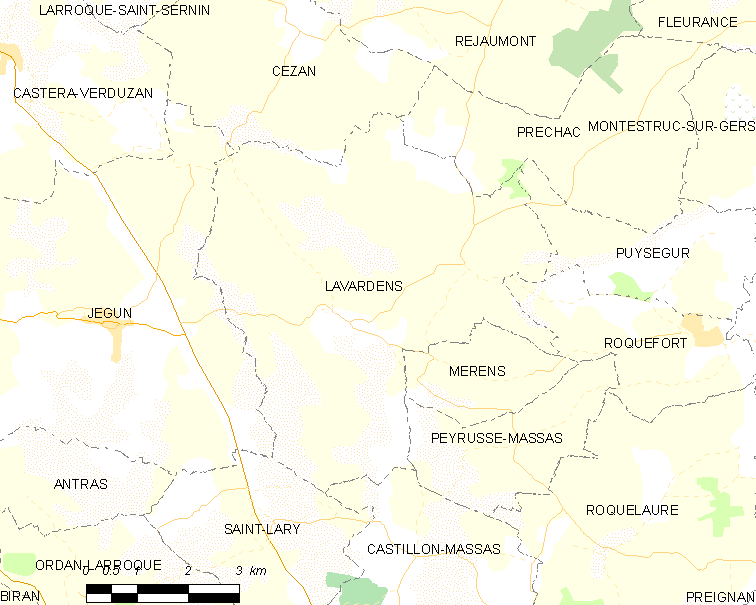
Lavardens and its surrounding communes

== Population ==
Historical population
Year	Pop.	±% p.a.
1968	504	—
1975	422	−2.50%
1982	373	−1.75%
1990	377	+0.13%
1999	378	+0.03%
2007	384	+0.20%
2012	402	+0.92%
2017	385	−0.86%
2023	363	−0.98%
Source: INSEE

== See also ==
- Communes of the Gers department
