= Roquelaure-Saint-Aubin =

- Commune
- Coat of arms
- Location of Roquelaure-Saint-Aubin
- Location within France Location within Occitanie
- Coordinates: 43°40′07″N 0°58′56″E
- Country: France
- Region: Occitania
- Department: Gers
- Arrondissement: Condom
- Canton: Gimone-Arrats

Government
  - Mayor (2020–2026): Anne-Marie Delaye
- Area^{1}: 4.21 km^{2} (1.63 sq mi)
- Elevation: 190 m (620 ft)
- Highest elevation: 211 m (692 ft)
- Lowest elevation: 160 m (520 ft)
- Population (2023): 102
  - Density: 24.2/km^{2} (62.8/sq mi)
- Time zone: UTC+01:00 (CET)
  - Summer (DST): UTC+02:00 (CEST)
- INSEE/Postal code: 32349 /32430
- ^{1} French Land Register data, which excludes lakes, ponds, glaciers > 1 km^{2} (0.386 sq mi or 247 acres) and river estuaries.

Roquelaure-Saint-Aubin (French pronunciation: [ʁɔkloʁ sɛ̃.t‿obɛ̃]; Occitan: Ròcalaura Sent Aubin) is a commune in the Gers department in southwestern France.

== Geography ==
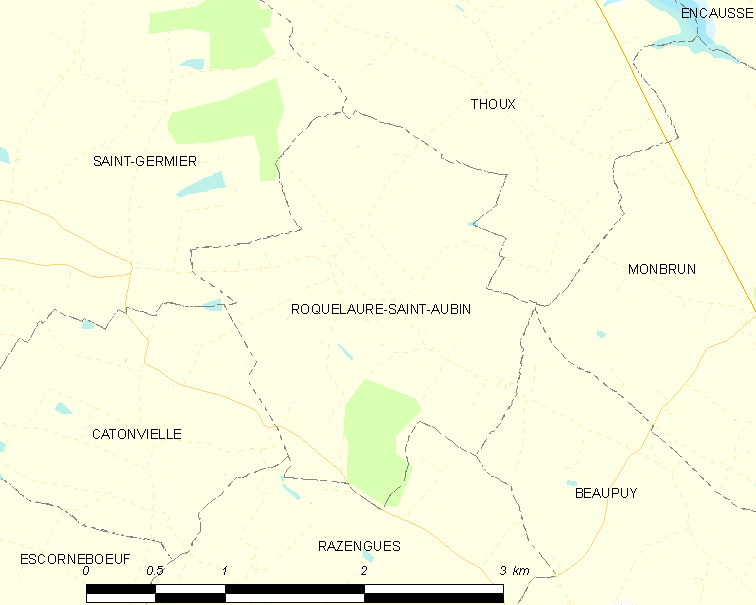
Roquelaure-Saint-Aubin and its surrounding communes

== Population ==
Historical population
Year	Pop.	±% p.a.
1968	47	—
1975	44	−0.94%
1982	58	+4.03%
1990	54	−0.89%
1999	60	+1.18%
2007	95	+5.91%
2012	126	+5.81%
2017	118	−1.30%
2023	102	−2.40%
Source: INSEE

== See also ==
- Communes of the Gers department
