= Deaths in November 2017 =

The following is a list of notable deaths in November 2017.

Entries for each day are listed alphabetically by surname. A typical entry lists information in the following sequence:

- Name, age, country of citizenship at birth, subsequent country of citizenship (if applicable), what subject was noted for, cause of death (if known), and reference.

== November 2017 ==
=== 1 ===
- Brad Bufanda, 34, American actor (Veronica Mars, A Cinderella Story, Co-Ed Confidential), suicide by jumping.
- Ramón Cabrero, 69, Spanish-born Argentine football player and coach (Lanús), stroke.
- Pablo Cedrón, 59, Argentine actor (You Are the One, El Viento).
- Eifion Evans, 86, Welsh church historian.
- Tor Henriksen, 84, Norwegian politician.
- Rosemary Lassig, 76, Australian swimmer, Olympic silver medalist (1960), complications from Alzheimer's disease.
- Katie Lee, 98, American folk singer and environmentalist.
- Václav Machek, 91, Czech cyclist, Olympic silver medallist (1956).
- Vladimir Makanin, 80, Russian writer.
- Leonis C. Malburg, 88, American politician and convicted criminal.
- Sue Margolis, 62, English novelist, lung cancer.
- John Mecray, 80, American painter, acute myeloid leukemia.
- Richard P. Mills, 72, American educator, Commissioner of Education of New York (1995–2009), heart attack.
- Paul V. Mullaney, 97, American politician and judge, Mayor of Worcester, Massachusetts (1963–1965).
- Myron Noodleman, 59, American baseball clown, sinus cancer.
- Yisrael Rosen, 76, Israeli Orthodox rabbi.
- Serhiy Ryzhkov, 59, Ukrainian shipwright and ecologist.
- James Tayoun, 87, American politician, member of the Pennsylvania House of Representatives (1969–1970).
- Peter Toms, 84, Australian politician, member of the New South Wales Legislative Assembly for Maitland (1981).
- Massimo Wilde, 73, Italian politician, Senator (1994–2001).
- Kenneth L. Williams, 83, American herpetologist and author.

=== 2 ===
- Francis Allotey, 85, Ghanaian mathematician and professor (KNUST), founding fellow of the African Academy of Sciences.
- Afif Bahnassi, 89, Syrian art historian.
- Costanzo Balleri, 84, Italian football player (Internazionale, Livorno) and manager (Livorno).
- Lady Ursula d'Abo, 100, English socialite.
- John Paul De Cecco, 92, American professor (San Francisco State University), pioneer of sexuality studies.
- Ralph Della-Volpe, 94, American painter.
- Orval H. Hansen, 91, American politician, member of the U.S. House of Representatives for Idaho's 2nd congressional district (1969–1975), complications from cancer.
- Bob Harper, 72, Australian politician, member of the Legislative Assembly of Queensland (1995–1998).
- William Landau, 93, American neurologist, co-namesake of Landau–Kleffner syndrome.
- Sir Michael Latham, 74, British politician, MP for Melton (1974–1983) and Rutland and Melton (1983–1992).
- Sarah Maguire, 60, English poet and translator, breast cancer.
- David Muise, 68, Canadian politician, MLA (1978–1981) and Mayor of Cape Breton Regional Municipality (1997–2000).
- Alan John Peters, 81, American violinist and conductor.
- Paddy Russell, 89, British television director (Doctor Who, Out of the Unknown, The Omega Factor).
- María Martha Serra Lima, 72, Argentine ballad and bolero singer.
- Manlio Simonetti, 91, Italian Biblical scholar.
- Aboubacar Somparé, 73, Guinean politician, President of the National Assembly (2002–2008).
- Joan Tisch, 90, American socialite, heiress to the Loews Corporation.
- Ron Van Horne, 85, Canadian politician, Ontario MPP (1977–1998).
- Dina Wadia, 98, Indian political figure, pneumonia.
- Bill Wilkerson, 72, American radio newsreader and sports announcer (KMOX, Missouri Tigers, St. Louis football Cardinals).

=== 3 ===
- Gaetano Bardini, 91, Italian opera singer, heart disease.
- Nadine Baylis, 77, English costume designer.
- Trevor Bell, 87, British artist.
- Abdur Rahman Biswas, 91, Bangladeshi politician, President (1991–1996), heart failure.
- Sid Catlett, 69, American basketball player (Cincinnati Royals), complications from brain hemorrhage.
- Ed Flanagan, 66, American politician, member of the Vermont Senate (2005–2011).
- William Frye, 96, American producer.
- Ismail Juma, 26, Tanzanian long-distance runner, motorcycle crash.
- Jiří Kormaník, 82, Czech wrestler, Olympic silver medalist (1964).
- Václav Riedlbauch, 70, Czech composer, pedagogue, manager and politician, Minister of Culture (2009–2010).
- Naomi Sego, 86, American Southern gospel singer.

=== 4 ===
- Jaakko Asikainen, 76, Finnish Olympic sports shooter (1972).
- Michael Augustine, 84, Indian Roman Catholic prelate, Bishop of Vellore (1981–1992) and Archbishop of Pondicherry and Cuddalore (1992–2004).
- Cheng Ch'ing-wen, 85, Taiwanese writer, heart attack.
- Isabel Granada, 41, Filipino actress and singer, aneurysm.
- Beryl Grant, 96, Australian community worker.
- Henry Gujer, 97, Swiss Olympic basketball player (1948).
- Tamara Natalie Madden, 42, Jamaican artist, ovarian cancer.
- João de Matos, 62, Angolan military officer.
- Derek Morgan, 88, English cricketer (Derbyshire).
- Luis Poggi, 88, Peruvian cyclist.
- Ned Romero, 90, American actor (Dan August, Hang 'Em High, Star Trek).
- Malcolm Scott, 59, Australian football player.
- Dudley Simpson, 95, Australian composer (Doctor Who, Blake's 7) and conductor (Royal Opera House).
- C. W. Smith, 70, American NASCAR driver.
- Tallys, 30, Brazilian footballer (Paysandu), traffic collision.
- Anna Diggs Taylor, 84, American federal judge, United States District Court for the Eastern District of Michigan (1979–1998).
- Gene Verble, 89, American baseball player (Washington Senators).
- Regina Yaou, 62, Ivorian writer.

=== 5 ===
- Renzo Calegari, 84, Italian cartoonist (Storia del West), stroke.
- Gwynn Christensen, 92, American football and baseball coach.
- Mary Ann Currier, 90, American painter.
- Digger Crown, 20, Swedish racehorse, euthanized.
- Don Eddy, 81, American college basketball coach (UTSA Roadrunners, Eastern Illinois Panthers).
- Robin Esser, 84, British newspaper executive (Sunday Express, Daily Mail).
- Nancy Friday, 84, American author (My Secret Garden, Forbidden Flowers, Women on Top), complications from Alzheimer's disease.
- Bob Girard, 69, Canadian ice hockey player (Washington Capitals).
- Helen John, 80, British anti-war activist.
- Paul Kerb, 87, Austrian Olympic fencer (1952, 1960).
- William Klemperer, 90, American chemist.
- Robert Knight, 77, American R&B singer ("Everlasting Love", "Love on a Mountain Top").
- Murray Koffler, 93, Canadian pharmacist and businessman, founder of Shoppers Drug Mart.
- Mansour bin Muqrin, 43–44, Saudi businessman, Vice Governor of 'Asir (since 2013), helicopter crash.
- Sir Hugh Neill, 96, British businessman and public servant.
- Louis Roney, 96, American opera singer.
- Geoff Rothwell, 97, British Royal Air Force bomber pilot of the Second World War.
- Vera Shlakman, 108, American economist and professor.
- George Edward Tait, 73, American poet.
- Dionatan Teixeira, 25, Brazilian-born Slovak footballer (Košice, Stoke City), heart attack.
- Lothar Thoms, 61, German track cyclist, Olympic champion (1980).

=== 6 ===
- Roger Becker, 83, British tennis player.
- Jansug Charkviani, 86, Georgian poet and politician, MP (1995–2003), Shota Rustaveli laureate (1984).
- Dave Cloutier, 78, American football player (Boston Patriots).
- Karin Dor, 79, German actress (You Only Live Twice, Topaz, The Spy with Ten Faces).
- Joe Fortunato, 87, American football player (Chicago Bears).
- Marek Frąckowiak, 67, Polish stage and film actor, spinal cancer.
- Scott Fredericks, 74, Irish actor (Doctor Who, See No Evil, Triangle).
- Richard F. Gordon Jr., 88, American astronaut (Gemini 11, Apollo 12).
- Günter Hoge, 77, German footballer (1. FC Union Berlin, East Germany national team).
- Jacques Landriault, 96, Canadian Roman Catholic prelate, Bishop of Hearst (1964–1971) and Timmins (1971–1990).
- Susan Linnee, 75, American journalist.
- Rolf Loeber, 75, Dutch-born American psychologist and criminologist.
- Clem Parker, 90, New Zealand Olympic sprinter.
- Feliciano Rivilla, 81, Spanish footballer (Atlético de Madrid, national team).
- Andrés Sapelak, 97, Polish-born Argentine Ukrainian Greek Catholic hierarch, Bishop of Santa María del Patrocinio in Buenos Aires (1968–1997).
- Rhona Silver, 66, American catering executive, heart attack.
- Rick Stelmaszek, 69, American baseball player (Texas Rangers) and coach (Minnesota Twins), pancreatic cancer.
- Kasëm Trebeshina, 92, Albanian writer.
- William Weintraub, 91, Canadian journalist, author and filmmaker.

=== 7 ===
- Roman Bittman, 76, Canadian television producer.
- Paul Buckmaster, 71, English arranger (Elton John, The Rolling Stones) and composer (12 Monkeys), Grammy winner (2002).
- Debra Chasnoff, 60, American documentary filmmaker (Deadly Deception: General Electric, Nuclear Weapons and Our Environment), Oscar winner (1992), breast cancer.
- Robert De Cormier, 95, American composer and conductor (The Belafonte Folk Singers).
- James B. Engle, 98, American diplomat, Ambassador to Benin (1974–1976).
- Wendell Eugene, 94, American jazz trombonist.
- Wahome Gakuru, 51, Kenyan politician, traffic collision.
- Pentti Glan, 71, Finnish-Canadian drummer (Alice Cooper, Lou Reed, Mandala), lung cancer.
- João Hall Themido, 93, Portuguese diplomat, Ambassador to the United States (1971–1981).
- Roy Halladay, 40, American baseball player (Toronto Blue Jays, Philadelphia Phillies), Cy Young Award winner (2003, 2010), plane crash.
- Brad Harris, 84, American actor and stuntman (Kommissar X, Goliath Against the Giants, The Pirates of the Mississippi).
- Loren Hightower, 89, American dancer.
- InternetHulk, 30, German professional esports player (Overwatch), enlarged heart.
- Dolores Kendrick, 90, American poet, complications from cancer.
- George McMillion, 85, American swimmer.
- M. Nannan, 94, Indian educationist.
- Paddles, 1, New Zealand polydactyl cat, co-owned by Prime Minister Jacinda Ardern, traffic collision.
- Brian Perry, 74, English cricketer (Shropshire).
- Hans-Michael Rehberg, 79, German actor (Schindler's List).
- Michael Ryan, 75, Australian Olympic hurdler (1964).
- Carl Sargeant, 49, Welsh politician, AM (since 2003), suicide by hanging.
- Hans Schäfer, 90, German footballer (1. FC Köln, West Germany national team), FIFA World Cup winner (1954).
- Amelia Toledo, 90, Brazilian sculptor and painter.
- Leigh Wharton, 93, British-born American actor and filmmaker.

=== 8 ===
- Antonio Carluccio, 80, Italian chef, restaurateur and television presenter (Two Greedy Italians), fall.
- John H. Cushman, 96, American military officer, Commander of the I Corps (1976–1978) and the 101st Airborne Division (1972–1973), stroke.
- Eva Ernström, 56, Swedish Olympic athlete (1984).
- Roger Grenier, 98, French writer and journalist.
- Tim Gudgin, 87, British radio presenter.
- Pat Hutchins, 75, British illustrator, author and actress (Rosie and Jim), cancer.
- Geoffrey Jameson, 89, Australian Olympic wrestler.
- Jo Jeonggwon, 68, South Korean poet and critic.
- Janusz Kłosiński, 96, Polish actor.
- Doug Moseley, 89, American author and politician.
- Wood Moy, 99, American actor (Chan Is Missing, Howard the Duck, Final Analysis).
- Don Prince, 79, American baseball player (Chicago Cubs).
- Jean-Pierre Pujol, 76, French politician, Deputy for Gers's 1st constituency (2001–2002), Mayor of Nogaro (1989–2008).
- Simo Saloranta, 82, Finnish Olympic long-distance runner.
- Atli Steinarsson, 88, Icelandic Olympic swimmer.
- Ewald Tauer, 76, German Olympic wrestler.
- Tugboat Taylor, 71, American professional wrestler.
- Charles Tyner, 94, American actor (Cool Hand Luke, The Outlaw Josey Wales, Planes, Trains and Automobiles).
- Josip Weber, 52, Croatian-Belgian footballer (Cercle Brugge, Croatia national team, Belgium national team), cancer.
- Dov Yaffe, 89, Lithuanian-born Israeli rabbi.

=== 9 ===
- Ingrid Almqvist, 90, Swedish Olympic javelin thrower (1948, 1956, 1960).
- Rob Astbury, 69, Australian sports journalist.
- Grete Berget, 63, Norwegian politician, Minister of Children and Family Affairs (1991–1996), cancer.
- Sir Arlington Butler, 79, Bahamian politician.
- Bill Cashmore, 56, British actor (Brass Eye, Fist of Fun).
- Donald S. Coffey, 85, American physician.
- Fred Cole, 69, American singer and musician (The Lollipop Shoppe, Dead Moon), liver disease.
- Tom Coughlan, 83, New Zealand rugby union player (South Canterbury, national team).
- Akbar Eftekhari, 73, Iranian footballer (Persepolis F.C.).
- Robert Gensburg, 78, American lawyer.
- Ken Hashimoto, 86, Japanese-born American dermatologist, complications from Parkinson's disease.
- John Hillerman, 84, American actor (Magnum, P.I., Chinatown, Blazing Saddles), Emmy winner (1987), heart disease.
- Muhammad Ibrahim Joyo, 102, Pakistani writer and scholar.
- Gene Kotlarek, 77, American Olympic ski jumper (1960, 1964).
- Eric Marsh, 77, English cricketer.
- Chuck Mosley, 57, American singer (Faith No More, Bad Brains) and songwriter ("We Care a Lot"), drug overdose.
- Canaan Zinothi Moyo, 84, Zimbabwean politician.
- Chuck Nergard, 88, American politician, member of the Florida House of Representatives (1967–1976, 1978–1990).
- Priyan, 53, Indian cinematographer, heart attack.
- Pedro Serrano, 86, Puerto Rican Olympic weightlifter (1964, 1968).
- Jim Sladky, 70, American figure skater, world championship silver (1970) and bronze medalist (1969, 1971, 1972).
- Shyla Stylez, 35, Canadian pornographic actress.

=== 10 ===
- José Almanzor, 87, Mexican Olympic archer.
- Duffy Ayers, 102, English portrait painter.
- Luiz Alberto Moniz Bandeira, 81, Brazilian political scientist, historian and poet.
- Guy Barrabino, 83, French Olympic fencer (1960).
- Márcia Cabrita, 53, Brazilian actress (Sai de Baixo, Sete Pecados, Novo Mundo), ovarian cancer.
- Neil Clerehan, 94, Australian architect.
- Roy Cromack, 77, British Olympic cyclist.
- Bernhard Eckstein, 82, German Olympic racing cyclist, world champion (1960).
- Geoff Fletcher, 74, English rugby league player (Leigh Centurions).
- Harry Geffert, 83, American sculptor.
- Dorothy Grover, 80, New Zealand philosopher.
- Mohan Kumar, 83, Indian director.
- Ray Lovelock, 67, Italian actor (Fiddler on the Roof, Let Sleeping Corpses Lie, Murder Rock) and musician, cancer.
- Ron Mabra, 66, American football player (Atlanta Falcons, New York Jets).
- Knut Mørkved, 79, Norwegian diplomat.
- Erika Remberg, 85, Austrian actress (The Lickerish Quartet).
- A. G. Milkha Singh, 75, Indian cricketer.
- Peter Trower, 87, Canadian poet and novelist.
- Alan Tuffin, 84, British trade unionist.
- Mikhail Nikolayevich Zadornov, 69, Latvian-born Russian comedian and writer, cancer.

=== 11 ===
- Henry Badenhorst, 51, South African businessman, co-founder of Gaydar, suicide by jumping.
- Girish Bhargava, 76, Indian-born American film editor (The Muppets Celebrate Jim Henson, Camp Rock, Lemonade Mouth), heart attack.
- Kirti Nidhi Bista, 90, Nepali politician, Prime Minister (1969–1970, 1971–1973, 1977–1979), cancer.
- Vanu Bose, 52, American engineer and technology executive, pulmonary embolism.
- Lars Oftedal Broch, 78, Norwegian judge.
- Chiquito de la Calzada, 85, Spanish singer, actor and comedian, complications of cardiac catheterization.
- Tom Cornsweet, 88, American psychologist.
- Frank Corsaro, 92, American opera director and actor (Rachel, Rachel).
- Floyd Crawford, 88, Canadian ice hockey player, 1959 world championship team.
- Gemze de Lappe, 95, American dancer, pneumonia.
- Carlos Dívar, 75, Spanish magistrate, President of Audiencia Nacional (2001–2008), General Council of the Judiciary and Supreme Court (2008–2012), pulmonary edema.
- Henry Emeleus, 87, British geologist.
- Willy Johan Fredriksen, 87, Norwegian diplomat.
- Edward S. Herman, 92, American economist and journalist (Manufacturing Consent), bladder cancer.
- Franco Hernandez, 26, Filipino television personality (It's Showtime) and singer, drowned.
- Nate Hobgood-Chittick, 42, American football player (St. Louis Rams, Kansas City Chiefs, San Francisco 49ers), heart attack.
- Huang Shisong, 98, Chinese meteorologist.
- Arthur Kerman, 88, Canadian-born American nuclear physicist.
- Baard Owe, 81, Norwegian-born Danish actor (The Kingdom), lung cancer.
- Alessandro Pansa, 55, Italian business executive, heart attack.
- Rance Pless, 91, American baseball player (Kansas City Athletics).
- Jeffrey T. Richelson, 67, American author and national security researcher, cancer.
- Victor A. Rizzolo, 93, American politician.
- Amar Rouaï, 85, Algerian football player and manager.
- Valery Rozov, 52, Russian BASE jumper, wingsuit crash.
- Ian Wachtmeister, 84, Swedish metallurgic executive, count and politician, MP (1991–1994), founder of New Democracy, lymphoma.

=== 12 ===
- Bobby Baker, 89, American political adviser to Lyndon Johnson.
- Michel Chapuis, 87, French classical organist and pedagogue.
- Georges Firmin, 93, French Olympic weightlifter.
- Olga Göllner, 87, Romanian Olympic gymnast.
- Miklós Holop, 92, Hungarian water polo player, Olympic silver medalist (1948).
- Ben Hurt, 84, American college football player and coach.
- James O'Connor, 87, American sociologist and political economist.
- Børre Olsen, 53, Norwegian jewelry designer.
- Bernard Panafieu, 86, French Roman Catholic cardinal, Archbishop of Aix (1978–1994) and Marseille (1995–2006).
- Wendy Pepper, 53, American fashion designer (Project Runway), complications from pneumonia.
- Lady Cynthia Postan, 99, English horticulturist.
- John C. Raines, 84, American civil rights activist and member of the Citizens' Commission to Investigate the FBI, congestive heart failure.
- Jack Ralite, 89, French politician, MP (1973–1981), Minister of Health (1981–1983) and Senator (1995–2011).
- Geoffrey Rowley-Conwy, 9th Baron Langford, 105, British Army officer and hereditary peer.
- Eric Salzman, 84, American composer (Center for Contemporary Opera), heart attack.
- Edith Savage-Jennings, 93, American civil rights activist.
- Liz Smith, 94, American gossip columnist (Newsday, New York Daily News).
- Mikko Vainio, 94, Finnish politician, MP (1970–1975, 1983–1987).
- Santiago Vernazza, 89, Argentine footballer (River Plate, AC Milan, national team).
- Lawrence R. Yetka, 93, American judge (Associate Justice of the Minnesota Supreme Court, 1973–1993) and politician (Minnesota House of Representatives, 1951–1961).

=== 13 ===
- Paul Brown, 57, Welsh costume designer (Angels and Insects).
- Jeff Capel II, 64, American college basketball coach (North Carolina A&T, Old Dominion), amyotrophic lateral sclerosis.
- Bobby Doerr, 99, American Hall of Fame baseball player (Boston Red Sox).
- Vladimir Goldner, 83, Croatian physician.
- Thomas J. Hudner Jr., 93, American naval aviator, Medal of Honor recipient (Battle of Chosin Reservoir).
- Jeremy Hutchinson, Baron Hutchinson of Lullington, 102, British lawyer and life peer.
- Peter Imbert, Baron Imbert, 84, British police officer, Commissioner of the Metropolitan Police (1987–1992) and life peer.
- Alina Janowska, 94, Polish actress, Alzheimer's disease.
- Yannis Kapsis, 88, Greek journalist (Ta Nea) and politician, Deputy Minister of Foreign Affairs (1982–1989).
- Haskell Monroe, 86, American educator, President of the University of Texas at El Paso (1980–1987) and the University of Missouri (1987–1993).
- Frank O'Connor, 94, Australian footballer (Melbourne).
- Kevin Phillips, 63, Canadian politician, member of the Legislative Assembly of Saskatchewan (since 2011).
- David Poisson, 35, French Olympic alpine skier (2010, 2014), training crash.
- František Poláček, 77, Czechoslovak Olympic boxer.
- Jim Rivera, 96, American baseball player (St. Louis Browns, Chicago White Sox, Kansas City Athletics).
- Reynir Sigurðsson, 89, Icelandic Olympic sprinter.

=== 14 ===
- Jack Blessing, 66, American actor (Moonlighting, The Naked Truth, George Lopez), pancreatic cancer.
- Grahame Chevalier, 80, South African cricketer (Western Province).
- Thomas Hansell, 63, English cricketer.
- Abdul Mannan Hossain, 65, Indian politician, MP (2004–2014).
- Hou Zongbin, 88, Chinese politician, Governor of Shaanxi (1990–1992).
- Toivo Jaatinen, 91, Finnish sculptor.
- Barbara Jones-Hogu, 79, American artist.
- Albert C. Ledner, 93, American architect.
- Little Mama, c.79, African-born chimpanzee (Lion Country Safari), oldest on record, kidney failure.
- Uwe Reinhardt, 80, German-born Canadian-American economist (Princeton University).
- Jean-Pierre Schmitz, 85, Luxembourgish road bicycle racer.
- Wolfgang Schreyer, 89, German writer.
- Shyama, 82, Indian actress.
- Gunnar Uldall, 76, German politician.
- Nancy Zieman, 64, American writer and television host (Sewing with Nancy), cancer.

=== 15 ===
- Luis Bacalov, 84, Argentine-born Italian composer (Il Postino), Oscar winner (1996), stroke.
- Jill Barklem, 66, British writer and illustrator (Brambly Hedge).
- Keith Barron, 83, British actor (Duty Free, The Odd Man, The Nigel Barton Plays).
- Camilo Cerviño, 89, Argentine footballer.
- Sara Craven, 79, British author.
- David S. Cunningham Jr., 82, American politician, Los Angeles City Councilman (1973–1987) cancer.
- Sister Dame Pauline Engel, 87, New Zealand nun and educator (Carmel College).
- Bill Haigh, 93, Australian politician, member of the New South Wales Legislative Assembly for Maroubra (1968–1983).
- Françoise Héritier, 84, French anthropologist, ethnologist and feminist.
- Robert G. Jahn, 87, American physicist and parapsychologist.
- Frans Krajcberg, 96, Polish-born Brazilian artist.
- Joy Lofthouse, 94, British World War II pilot.
- Lure, 28, American thoroughbred racehorse.
- Moana Manley, 82, New Zealand swimmer and beauty queen, Miss New Zealand (1954), complications from stroke.
- J. Steve Mostyn, 46, American lawyer and philanthropist, suicide by gunshot.
- Kunwar Narayan, 90, Indian poet.
- Hamad Ndikumana, 39, Rwandan footballer.
- Eric P. Newman, 106, American numismatist.
- Bert Ormond, 86, British-born New Zealand footballer (Falkirk, New Zealand national team).
- Lil Peep, 21, American singer and rapper, drug overdose.
- Jaroslav Vanek, 87, Czech-born American economist.
- Halina Wasilewska-Trenkner, 75, Polish economist.
- Peter Wooley, 82, American production designer and art director (Blazing Saddles, The Day After, Summer Rental).

=== 16 ===
- Micheline Dumon, 96, Belgian WWII resistance agent (Comet line).
- Tobias Enverga, 61, Filipino-born Canadian politician, Senator (since 2012).
- Ölziisaikhany Erdene-Ochir, 81, Mongolian Olympic wrestler.
- Tommy Farrer, 94, English footballer (Bishop Auckland).
- Wal Fife, 88, Australian politician and businessman, MP (1975–1993) and Minister for Business and Consumer Affairs (1977–1979), Education (1979–1982) and Aviation (1982–1983).
- Dennis C. Frederickson, 86, American politician.
- John Gambino, 77, Italian-born American mobster.
- Gary the Goat, 6, Australian comedic goat, euthanised.
- Adalberto Giazotto, 77, Italian physicist.
- Robert Hirsch, 92, French comedian and actor (Hiver 54, l'abbé Pierre; Le Misanthrope; The Caretaker), César Award winner (1990).
- Hsiao Teng-tzang, 83, Taiwanese politician, member of the Legislative Yuan (1973–1986), Minister of Justice (1988–1989).
- Franciszek Kornicki, 100, Polish fighter pilot, commander of the No. 308 and the No. 317 Fighter Squadrons.
- Tommy Moore, 69, American baseball player (New York Mets, Seattle Mariners, Texas Rangers).
- Ferdie Pacheco, 89, American physician and boxing cornerman (Muhammad Ali).
- Mohammad Poursattar, 78, Iranian actor (Caravans, The Messiah, Prophet Joseph).
- Kenneth Ryskamp, 85, American judge, member of the U.S. District Court for Southern Florida (since 1986).
- Jack Stauffacher, 96, American printer and typographer.
- Jimmy Steele, 55, British dentist, brain cancer.
- Greg Standridge, 50, American politician, member of the Arkansas Senate (since 2015), cancer.
- Hiromi Tsuru, 57, Japanese voice actress (Dragon Ball, Metal Gear Solid, Ghost Sweeper Mikami), aortic dissection.
- Ann Wedgeworth, 83, American actress (Three's Company, Evening Shade, Steel Magnolias), Tony winner (1978).

=== 17 ===
- Narsimh Bhandari, 83, Indian cricketer.
- Steve Bowman, 72, American football player (New York Giants).
- J. C. Caroline, 84, American football player (Chicago Bears).
- Djohan Effendi, 78, Indonesian politician and activist, Secretary of State (2000–2001).
- Aijalon Gomes, 38, American teacher, imprisoned by the Government of North Korea in 2010.
- Bert Hohol, 94, Canadian politician.
- Lilli Hornig, 96, Czech-American scientist, feminist activist.
- Earle Hyman, 91, American actor (The Cosby Show, ThunderCats, The Lady from Dubuque).
- Erich Kukk, 89, Estonian phycologist and conservationist.
- Lucas Li Jing-feng, 95, Chinese clandestine Roman Catholic prelate, Coadjutor Bishop (1980–1983) and Bishop of Fengxiang (since 1983).
- William Mayer, 91, American composer.
- Andrew McGraw, 79, American politician.
- Wally McNamee, 84, American photojournalist.
- William Pachner, 102, Czech-born American painter.
- Ulrich Petersen, 89, Peruvian-born American geologist.
- Bill Pitt, 80, British politician, MP for Croydon North West (1981–1983).
- Robert D. Raiford, 89, American news anchor (WCNC-TV) and actor (The Handmaid's Tale, Super Mario Bros.).
- Salvatore Riina, 87, Italian mobster, capo of the Sicilian Mafia, sepsis.
- Aleksandr Salnikov, 68, Ukrainian basketball player, Olympic bronze medalist (1976, 1980).
- Howard Bruner Schaffer, 88, American diplomat, Ambassador to Bangladesh (1984–1987).
- Les Tonks, 75, English rugby league footballer (Featherstone Rovers).
- Hans-Heinrich Voigt, 96, German astronomer.
- Rikard Wolff, 59, Swedish actor (House of Angels) and singer ("Pojken på månen"), pulmonary emphysema.
- Óscar Zamora, 83, Bolivian politician, complications from a stroke.
- Wan Zawawi, 68, Malaysian Olympic footballer (1972).

=== 18 ===
- Azzedine Alaïa, 82, Tunisian-French fashion designer.
- Giorgio Antonucci, 84, Italian physician.
- Bob Borkowski, 91, American baseball player (Chicago Cubs, Cincinnati Reds, Brooklyn Dodgers).
- Flawless Sabrina, 78, American drag queen and trans rights activist.
- William Hoeveler, 95, American judge, member of the U.S. District Court for Southern Florida (1977–1991).
- Fotis Kafatos, 77, Greek biologist, founder and president of European Research Council (2005–2010).
- José Manuel Maza, 66, Spanish lawyer and criminologist, Attorney General (since 2016), kidney infection.
- Commins Menapi, 40, Solomon Islands footballer (Sydney United, Waitakere, national team).
- Enrique Mendizábal, 99, Peruvian Olympic sport shooter.
- John Murray, 93, British Olympic ice hockey player (1948).
- Youssouf Ouédraogo, 64, Burkinabé politician, Prime Minister (1992–1994).
- Friedel Rausch, 77, German football player (Schalke 04) and manager, skin cancer.
- Ben Riley, 84, American jazz drummer (Thelonious Monk, Kenny Barron, Sphere).
- Gillian Rolton, 61, Australian equestrian, Olympic champion (1992, 1996), endometrial cancer.
- Pancho Segura, 96, Ecuadorian tennis player, Parkinson's disease.
- Colin Seymour-Ure, 79, English academic.
- Ken Shapiro, 75, American writer, producer, film director, and actor (Texaco Star Theatre, The Groove Tube, Modern Problems), cancer.
- Peter Spufford, 83, British historian.
- Naim Süleymanoğlu, 50, Bulgarian-Turkish weightlifter, Olympic champion (1988, 1992, 1996), liver disease.
- Malcolm Young, 64, Scottish-born Australian Hall of Fame guitarist and songwriter (AC/DC), dementia.

=== 19 ===
- Claudio Báez, 69, Mexican actor and singer.
- Peter Baldwin, 86, American actor and director (The Wonder Years, Sanford and Son, Newhart), Emmy winner (1989).
- Phil Baldwin, 75, American Olympic boxer.
- Ronnie Butler, 80, Bahamian singer and entertainer, cancer.
- John Carlin, 88, Scottish actor.
- Andrea Cordero Lanza di Montezemolo, 92, Italian Roman Catholic cardinal and Vatican diplomat, Apostolic Nuncio (1977–2001).
- Moussa Moumouni Djermakoye, 73, Nigerien politician.
- Alex Ifeanyichukwu Ekwueme, 85, Nigerian politician, Vice President (1979–1983).
- Rita Koiral, 58, Indian actress, cancer.
- Charles Manson, 83, American criminal (Tate murders), songwriter (Lie: The Love and Terror Cult) and cult leader (Manson Family), cardiac arrest due to colon cancer.
- Fernando Matthei, 92, Chilean air force general, Commander-in-Chief (1978–1991).
- Milan Moguš, 90, Croatian linguist and academician.
- Warren "Pete" Moore, 79, American Hall of Fame singer (The Miracles), songwriter ("The Tracks of My Tears", "Ain't That Peculiar"), record producer and arranger.
- Jana Novotná, 49, Czech tennis player, cancer.
- Luther Rackley, 71, American basketball player (Cleveland Cavaliers, New York Knicks).
- Della Reese, 86, American actress (Touched by an Angel, Chico and the Man) and singer ("Don't You Know?").
- Tai Chen-yao, 69, Taiwanese politician, member of the Legislative Yuan (1990–1996, 1999–2002), pancreatic cancer.
- Mel Tillis, 85, American Hall of Fame country music singer-songwriter ("I Ain't Never", "Coca-Cola Cowboy") and actor (The Cannonball Run), respiratory failure due to diverticulitis.
- Elias Tolentino, 75, Filipino Olympic basketball player (1968).

=== 20 ===
- István Almási, 73, Hungarian politician, mayor of Hódmezővásárhely (since 2012).
- Irlo Bronson Jr., 81, American politician.
- Iris Campbell, 77, American health advocate and politician, First Lady of South Carolina (1987–1995).
- Priya Ranjan Dasmunsi, 72, Indian politician, MP (1971–1977, 1984–1989, 1996–1998, 1999–2009), Minister of Parliamentary Affairs and Information and Broadcasting (2004–2008).
- Eugene Domack, 61, American geologist.
- Terry Glenn, 43, American football player (New England Patriots, Green Bay Packers, Dallas Cowboys), traffic collision.
- John Gordon, 92, English author (The Giant Under The Snow), Alzheimer's disease.
- Amir Hamed, 55, Uruguayan writer and translator, cancer.
- Jean Hearn, 96, Australian politician, Senator (1980–1985).
- Ismaïl Khelil, 85, Tunisian diplomat and politician, Governor of the Central Bank of Tunisia (1987–1990), Minister of Foreign Affairs (1990) and Ambassador to the United States (1991).
- István Konkoly, 87, Hungarian Roman Catholic prelate, Bishop of Szombathely (1987–2006).
- Raimo Lindholm, 86, Finnish Olympic basketball player.
- Víctor Hipólito Martínez, 92, Argentine lawyer and politician, Vice President (1983–1989).
- Ernestine Petras, 93, American baseball player (AAGPBL).
- K. V. L. Narayan Rao, 63, Indian television executive (NDTV).
- Hugh Ross, 80, Canadian-born American bridge player.
- Laila Sari, 82, Indonesian singer and actress (Wadjah Seorang Laki-laki).
- Pamela Sklar, 58, American psychiatrist and neuroscientist.
- John G. Stoessinger, 90, Austrian-born American author.
- Alan Walker, 79, British paleoanthropologist, discoverer of "the Black Skull".
- Janusz Wójcik, 64, Polish politician, football player (Gwardia, Hutnik Warszawa) and coach, member of the Sejm (2005–2007).
- Izabella Zielińska, 106, Polish pianist and educator.

=== 21 ===
- Paul D. Aasness, 77, American politician, member of the Minnesota House of Representatives (1979–1982).
- Derek Barber, Baron Barber of Tewkesbury, 99, British life peer, Member of the House of Lords (1992–2016).
- Peter Berling, 83, German actor and writer (Aguirre, the Wrath of God, The Name of the Rose).
- Rodney Bewes, 79, British actor (The Likely Lads, Whatever Happened to the Likely Lads?) and writer (Dear Mother...Love Albert).
- Sudip Datta Bhaumik, Indian journalist, shot.
- Harry Blamires, 101, British Anglican theologian, literary critic, and novelist.
- Alice Burks, 97, American author.
- David Cassidy, 67, American pop singer ("Cherish", "How Can I Be Sure") and actor (The Partridge Family), liver failure.
- Wayne Cochran, 78, American soul singer and songwriter ("Last Kiss"), cancer.
- George E. Collins, 89, American mathematician and computer scientist.
- Milein Cosman, 96, German-born British artist.
- Hugh Currie, 92, Canadian ice hockey player (Montreal Canadiens).
- Luis Garisto, 71, Uruguayan football player (Cobreloa, national team) and coach (Peñarol, Club Atlas, Deportivo Toluca F.C.).
- Iola Gregory, 71, Welsh actress (Pobol y Cwm).
- Valentin Huot, 88, French racing cyclist.
- Guillermo Irizarry, 101, Puerto Rican politician, Secretary of State of Puerto Rico (1966–1969).
- Keith Muxlow, 84, American politician, member of the Michigan House of Representatives (1981–1992).
- Andrew Jonathan Nok, 55, Nigerian biochemist.
- László Pál, 75, Hungarian politician, Minister of Industry and Trade (1994–95).
- Tom Parry, 94, American football coach.
- Ann Sloat, 89, Canadian politician, Ontario MPP (1984–1985).
- Masao Sugiuchi, 97, Japanese Go player.
- Joseph White, 84, American psychologist and civil rights activist, heart attack.

=== 22 ===
- George Avakian, 98, American record producer and executive (Columbia Records).
- Norman Baker, 89, American explorer, plane crash.
- Salvador E. Casellas, 82, Puerto Rican judge, member of the U.S. District Court for Puerto Rico (1994–2005).
- Akhmed Chatayev, 37, Russian jihadist, shot.
- John Coates Jr., 79, American jazz pianist.
- Hilda Eisen, 100, Polish-born American philanthropist and Holocaust survivor.
- Mona Fong, 83, Hong Kong film producer (The 36th Chamber of Shaolin).
- Andrzej Wincenty Górski, 97, Polish academic.
- Samuel P. Hays, 96, American historian.
- Jon Hendricks, 96, American jazz singer and songwriter (Lambert, Hendricks & Ross).
- Maurice Hinchey, 79, American politician, member of the U.S. House of Representatives for New York's 26th (1993–2003) and 22nd district (2003–2013), frontotemporal dementia.
- Imre Hollai, 92, Hungarian diplomat, President of the United Nations General Assembly (1982–83).
- Dmitri Hvorostovsky, 55, Russian opera singer, brain cancer.
- Bobi Jones, 88, Welsh author and academic.
- Vartan Kechichian, 84, Syrian-born Armenian Catholic hierarch, Coadjutor Archbishop of Eastern Europe for Armenians (2001–2005).
- Tommy Keene, 59, American singer and songwriter.
- Otto Luttrop, 78, German football player and coach.
- Juan Luis Maurás, 95, Chilean politician, President of the Senate (1966) and the Chamber of Deputies (1958).
- Charles C. McDonald, 84, American USAF general.
- Biju Phukan, 69, Indian actor, heart disease.
- Stefan Radt, 90, Dutch classicist, professor at the University of Groningen (1967–1987).
- Morris Scharff, 88, American physicist.
- Bobbie L. Sterne, 97, American politician, Mayor of Cincinnati (1975–1976, 1978–1979).
- Edward C. Taylor, 94, American chemist.
- William J. White, 92, American Marine Corps Lieutenant General.

=== 23 ===
- Yüksel Alkan, 86, Turkish Olympic basketball player.
- François Aquin, 88, Canadian politician, Member of the National Assembly of Quebec (1966–1969).
- Tullio Baraglia, 83, Italian rower, Olympic silver (1960) and bronze medalist (1968).
- Donal Creed, 93, Irish politician, TD (1965–1989) and MEP (1973–1977), Alzheimer's disease.
- Gerald Doucet, 80, Canadian politician.
- Miguel Alfredo González, 34, Cuban baseball player (Philadelphia Phillies), traffic collision.
- William Hamilton, 86–87, Canadian Olympic cyclist.
- Allan Harris, 74, English footballer (Queens Park Rangers, Chelsea).
- Anthony Harvey, 87, British director (The Lion in Winter) and film editor (Dr. Strangelove, Lolita).
- Luther Hayes, 78, American football player (San Diego Chargers) and coach.
- Ralph Hurtig, 85, Swedish Olympic rower.
- Laeticia Kikonyogo, 77, Ugandan judge, member of the Supreme Court, heart attack.
- Bruce McEwan, 80, American politician.
- Carol Neblett, 71, American operatic soprano.
- Paul Paviot, 91, French film director.
- Stela Popescu, 81, Romanian actress (Uncle Marin, the Billionaire).
- Osborne Riviere, 85, Dominican politician, Acting Prime Minister (2004).
- Joe Schipp, 85, Australian politician, businessman and grazier, member of the New South Wales Legislative Assembly for Wagga Wagga (1975–1999).
- Dimitri Sjöberg, 37, Finnish tango singer, injuries sustained in a fall.
- Eric Sun, 34, American businessman (Facebook), glioblastoma.
- Craig Tieszen, 68, American politician, member of the South Dakota Senate (2009–2017) and House of Representatives (since 2017), drowned.
- Toyo Tsuchiya, 69, Japanese visual artist, heart failure.
- Ellsworth Webb, 86, American Olympic boxer.
- Ingrid I. Willoch, 74, Norwegian politician, MP (1981–1993).
- Manjit Wolstenholme, 53, British businesswoman (Future Publishing, Unite Group, Provident Financial), heart attack.
- Zhang Yang, 66, Chinese general, suicide by hanging.

=== 24 ===
- Ángel Berni, 86, Paraguayan footballer.
- Heribert Calleen, 93, German sculptor.
- Harriett Cassells, 90–91, Northern Irish nurse.
- Wesley L. Fox, 86, American Marine Corps colonel, Medal of Honor recipient (1971).
- Neil Gillman, 84, Canadian-born American rabbi and philosopher, cancer.
- Carl G. Holmes, 90, American firefighter.
- Steve Hutchins, 61, Australian politician, Senator (1998–2011), cancer.
- Stephen Knapp, 70, American artist.
- Lowen Kruse, 88, American politician, member of the Nebraska Legislature (2001–2009), cancer.
- Frank Kuchta, 81, American football player (Washington Redskins, Denver Broncos).
- Reijo Luostarinen, 77, Finnish organisational theorist and businessman.
- Mitch Margo, 70, American singer and songwriter (The Tokens).
- Charles L. Ormond, 84, American politician, acute myeloid leukemia.
- Cornel Pelmuș, 84, Romanian Olympic fencer (1960).
- John S. Rigden, 83, American physicist, cardiac arrest.
- Clotilde Rosa, 87, Portuguese harpist, music educator and composer.
- Hermann Schwörer, 95, German businessman and politician, MEP (1970–1979).
- Ed Scrobe, 94, American Olympic artistic gymnast (1948, 1952).
- Gaetan Serré, 79, Canadian politician, member of the House of Commons (1968–1972).
- Bari Siddiqui, 63, Bangladeshi singer and songwriter, kidney disease.
- Gabriel Simo, 80, Cameroonian Roman Catholic prelate, Auxiliary Bishop of Douala (1987–1994) and Bafoussam (1994–2013).
- Pedro Sisti, 86, Argentine Olympic sailor.
- John Thierry, 46, American football player (Chicago Bears, Green Bay Packers), heart attack.

=== 25 ===
- John Black, 84, American politician, member of the Georgia State Senate (1994–1996).
- Bertha Calloway, 92, American historian and museologist, founder of Great Plains Black History Museum, pneumonia.
- Ignazio Colnaghi, 93, Italian voice actor and actor.
- Steve Doszpot, 69, Hungarian-born Australian politician, member of the Australian Capital Territory Legislative Assembly (since 2008), liver cancer.
- Sotir Ferrara, 79, Italian Italo-Albanian Greek Catholic hierarch, Bishop of Piana degli Albanesi (1988–2013).
- Edward Fudge, 73, American theologian.
- Jesús Gómez, 76, Mexican equestrian, Olympic bronze medalist (1980).
- Ralph Richard Grady, 90, American politician.
- Ken Gray, 81, American football player (Chicago Cardinals, Houston Oilers).
- Rosario Green, 76, Mexican economist, diplomat and politician, Minister for Foreign Affairs (1998–2000) and Senator (2006–2012).
- Rance Howard, 89, American actor (Apollo 13, Ed Wood, Frost/Nixon), heart failure.
- Robert Howie, 88, Canadian politician.
- Rosendo Huesca Pacheco, 85, Mexican Roman Catholic prelate, Archbishop of Puebla de los Ángeles (1977–2009).
- Steve "Snapper" Jones, 75, American basketball player (New Orleans Buccaneers, Dallas Chaparrals, Portland Trail Blazers) and analyst (NBA on NBC).
- Anna Kuzmina, 84, Russian Yakut actress.
- Biddy White Lennon, 71, Irish actress (The Riordans) and food writer.
- John M. Lewellen, 87, American politician, member of the Arkansas House of Representatives (1999–2004).
- Bogdan Maglich, 89, Yugoslav-born American nuclear physicist.
- Julio Oscar Mechoso, 62, American actor (Planet Terror, Jurassic Park III, Bad Boys), heart attack.
- Harry Pregerson, 94, American judge, member of the U.S. 9th Circuit Court of Appeals (1979–2015) and U.S. District Court for Central California (1967–1979).
- Vladimir Shkurikhin, 59, Russian volleyball player, Olympic silver medalist (1988).

=== 26 ===
- Khawaja Akmal, 69, Pakistani actor and comedian, heart attack.
- Ruth Bancroft, 109, American landscape architect, creator of Ruth Bancroft Garden.
- Ian Begg, 92, Scottish architect.
- José Doth de Oliveira, 79, Brazilian Roman Catholic prelate, Bishop of Iguatu (2000–2009), complications from Alzheimer's disease.
- Garnett Thomas Eisele, 94, American judge, member of the U.S. District Court for Eastern Arkansas (1970–1991).
- Frances M. Gage, 93, Canadian sculptor.
- Vicente García Bernal, 88, Mexican Roman Catholic prelate, Bishop of Ciudad Obregón (1988–2005).
- Armando Hart, 87, Cuban politician and revolutionary, leader of 26th of July Movement and minister of Education (1959–1965) and Culture (1976–1997), respiratory failure.
- Hou Bo, 93, Chinese photographer.
- Georg Iggers, 90, American historian and civil rights advocate, complications from a cerebral hemorrhage.
- Rahija Khanam Jhunu, 74, Bangladeshi dancer.
- Alessandro Leogrande, 40, Italian journalist, heart attack.
- Mick Martyn, 81, English rugby league footballer (Leigh).
- Hans Mol, 95, Dutch sociologist.
- Julia Mullock, 89, American Korean royal.
- Christian Vicente Noel, 80, Filipino Roman Catholic prelate, Bishop of Talibon (1986–2014).
- José Pedro Pozzi, 92, Italian-born Argentine Roman Catholic prelate, Bishop of Alto Valle del Río Negro (1993–2003).
- Patrick J. Roma, 68, American politician, stroke.
- Eliezer Spiegel, 95, Israeli football player and manager.
- Timothy Stamps, 81, Welsh-born Zimbabwean politician, Minister of Health (1986–2002), lung infection.
- Peggy Vining, 88, American poet.
- W. Marvin Watson, 93, American presidential advisor and Postmaster General (1968–1969).

=== 27 ===
- Oluyemi Adeniji, 83, Nigerian diplomat and politician, Minister of Foreign Affairs (2003–2006).
- Robert Batailly, 83, French politician, MEP (1989).
- Narayanrao Bodas, 85, Indian singer.
- Loïc Bouvard, 88, French politician, MP (1988–2012).
- John H. Coote, 81, British physiologist.
- Dermot Drummy, 56, English football player (Blackpool) and coach (Chelsea Academy, Crawley Town), suicide.
- Bill Harris, 83, American politician, member (2000–2010) and President (2005–2010) of the Ohio Senate.
- Davor Jović, 61, Croatian army officer and kickboxer.
- Cletus P. Kurtzman, 79, American mycologist, heart attack.
- Bud Moore, 92, American NASCAR Hall of Fame team owner (Bud Moore Engineering).
- Keiji Morokuma, 83, Japanese theoretical chemist.
- Robert Popwell, 66, American bass guitarist (The Young Rascals, The Crusaders).
- Samantha Rebillet, 45, French-born Australian film director and actress, suicide.
- José María Romero de Tejada, 69, Spanish jurist and prosecutor, Attorney General of Catalonia (since 2013), complications from leukemia.
- Bob Seidemann, 75, American rock album cover designer (Blind Faith) and photographer (Grateful Dead, Janis Joplin), Parkinson's disease.
- Inge Solar, 90, Austrian Olympic skater (1948).
- Warren Spannaus, 86, American lawyer and politician, Attorney General of Minnesota (1971–1983), complications from cancer.
- Cristina Stamate, 71, Romanian actress, stroke.

=== 28 ===
- Pentti Alonen, 92, Finnish Olympic alpine skier (1948, 1952, 1956).
- Sir Peter Burt, 73, Scottish businessman, chief executive (1996–2001) and Governor (2001–2003) of Bank of Scotland, chairman of ITV plc (2004–2007).
- Alice Lok Cahana, 88, Hungarian artist and concentration camp survivor.
- Joseph N. Crowley, 84, American academic administrator, President of University of Nevada, Reno (1978–2001), pneumonia.
- Magín Díaz, 94, Colombian folk singer and songwriter, Latin Grammy winner (2017).
- George Feher, 93, Czechoslovak-born American biophysicist.
- Patrícia Gabancho, 65, Argentine-born Spanish writer and journalist, lung cancer.
- Fritz Graf, 94, American National Football League official.
- Rafael Llano Cifuentes, 84, Mexican-born Brazilian Roman Catholic prelate, Bishop of Nova Friburgo (2004–2010).
- Jimmy McEwan, 88, Scottish footballer (Raith Rovers, Aston Villa).
- Clarrie Millar, 92, Australian politician, MP for Wide Bay (1974–1990).
- Don Moore, 89, American judge and politician, member of the Tennessee House of Representatives (1956–1958, 1964–1966) and Senate (1966–1970).
- Sir Martin Nourse, 85, British jurist, Lord Justice of Appeal (1985–2001).
- Shadia, 86, Egyptian actress and singer, stroke.
- Zdeněk Šreiner, 63, Czech footballer (Baník Ostrava), Olympic champion (1980).
- Johan Steyn, Baron Steyn, 85, South African-born British jurist and life peer, Law Lord (1995–2005).
- Thodupuzha Vasanthi, 65, Indian actress, cancer.

=== 29 ===
- Maria Luisa Altieri Biagi, 87, Italian linguist.
- Sol Bellear, 66, Australian Aboriginal rights activist.
- Harold Billings, 86, American librarian and author.
- E. Chandrasekharan Nair, 88, Indian politician.
- Don Coles, 90, Canadian poet.
- Willie John Daly, 92, Irish hurler.
- Belmiro de Azevedo, 79, Portuguese lumber manufacturing executive, founder of Sonae.
- Kenneth S. Deffeyes, 85, American geologist.
- Jerry Fodor, 82, American philosopher and cognitive scientist, complications from Parkinson's disease.
- Fran Hopper, 95, American cartoonist.
- Aminul Islam, 82, Bangladeshi academic.
- Tomáš Ježek, 77, Czech economist and politician, member of the Czech National Council (1990–1992) and Chamber of Deputies (1993–1996).
- Gencay Kasapçı, 84, Turkish painter.
- Charles E. Merrill Jr., 97, American educator (founder of Commonwealth School), author and philanthropist.
- Véronique Nordey, 78, French actress, cancer.
- Heather North, 71, American actress (Scooby-Doo, Days of Our Lives, The Barefoot Executive), cardiac arrest.
- Slobodan Praljak, 72, Croatian military officer and war criminal, suicide by cyanide poisoning.
- Verena Stefan, 70, Swiss writer.
- William Steinkraus, 92, American equestrian, Olympic champion (1968).
- Ján Strausz, 75, Slovak footballer.
- László Szabó, 62, Hungarian Olympic handball player (1980, 1988).
- P. Vallalperuman, 67, Indian politician, heart illness.
- Robert Walker, 80, American blues musician, cancer.
- Tony Whitten, 64, British conservationist, traffic collision
- Bondan Winarno, 67, Indonesian culinary writer.
- Mary Lee Woods, 93, British mathematician and computer programmer.

=== 30 ===
- Kalabhavan Abi, 52, Indian actor and comedian, leukaemia.
- Taher Ahmadzadeh, 96, Iranian politician, Governor of Khorasan Province (1979).
- Unity Bainbridge, 101, Canadian artist and writer.
- Terence Beesley, 60, British actor (EastEnders, The Phantom of the Opera, War & Peace), suicide by inert gas asphyxiation.
- Sreerupa Bose, 66, Indian cricketer.
- Habibollah Chaichian, 94, Iranian poet.
- Alfie Curtis, 87, British actor (Star Wars, The Elephant Man, Cribb).
- Clifford David, 89, American actor (Bill and Ted's Excellent Adventure, Signs, Kinsey) and singer.
- Alan D'Ardis Erskine-Murray, 14th Lord Elibank, 93, Scottish nobleman.
- Russell Evans, 52, English cricket player and umpire, complications during surgery.
- Dick Gernert, 89, American baseball player (Boston Red Sox).
- Colin Groves, 75, British-born Australian biologist and professor (Australian National University).
- Donald Harper, 85, American diver, Olympic silver medalist (1956).
- Annisul Huq, 65, Bangladeshi businessman, mayor of Dhaka North City Corporation (since 2015).
- Gary Ingram, 84, American politician, member of the Idaho House of Representatives (1973–1980, 2012), cancer.
- Alain Jessua, 85, French film director and screenwriter (Léon la lune, The Killing Game).
- Bertha Kawakami, 86, American politician and educator, member of the Hawaii House of Representatives (1987–2006).
- George March, 85, English cricketer.
- Alfredo Milani, 93, Italian motorbike racer.
- Frank Mulzoff, 89, American college basketball player and coach.
- Jon Naar, 97, British-American author and photographer.
- Jim Nabors, 87, American actor (Gomer Pyle, U.S.M.C., The Andy Griffith Show, The Best Little Whorehouse in Texas) and singer.
- Surin Pitsuwan, 68, Thai diplomat and politician, Minister of Foreign Affairs (1997–2001) and Secretary General of ASEAN (2008–2012), heart attack.
- Marina Popovich, 86, Russian test pilot.
- Vincent Scully, 97, American architecture historian, complications from Parkinson's disease.
- Akram Zaki, 86, Pakistani politician and diplomat, cardiac illness.
