= Frank Kleffner =

Frank R. Kleffner (October 10, 1925 – June 12, 2015) was an American pathologist who was a professor at Washington University in St. Louis, noted for his contributions in the fields of speech and language pathology and hearing.

His work with William Landau and Harold Klawans advanced his career beyond regular work in a neurology clinic. His name became well known for a controversial treatment for a disease affecting children under the age of five and causing acquired aphasia (Landau–Kleffner syndrome).

In 1976 Dr. Kleffner became the Director of the Institute of Logopedics in Wichita, Kansas, until his retirement.

== Frank R. Kleffner Clinical Career Award ==
An award for excellence in speech-language pathology has been presented annually in his name since 1986.

The Frank R. Kleffner Clinical Career Award is given to a speech-language pathologist or audiologist in recognition of outstanding contributions to clinical science and practice in communication science and disorders over a period of twenty years or more. Selection of the award recipient is based on the criteria established by the American Speech-Language-Hearing Foundation (a body founded in 1946, affiliated to the American Speech-Language-Hearing Association).

== Publications ==
- PubMed Database of Kleffner's works
- Language Disorders in Children, 1973. ISBN 0-672-61292-5
