= Loeber =

Loeber or Löber is a surname of German origin. Notable people with the surname include:

- Dietrich A. Loeber (1923–2004), German legal scholar
- Lou Loeber (1894–1983), Dutch painter
- Rolf Loeber (1942–2017), American psychologist and criminologist
- Walter Löber (1909–?), German racing cyclist
