= Women on Top =

1991 Nancy Friday sequel to Forbidden Flowers

Women on Top: How Real Life Has Changed Women's Sexual Fantasies
- Author: Nancy Friday
- Language: English
- Subject: Female sexuality
- Published: 1991
- Publication place: United States
- Media type: Print

Women on Top: How Real Life Has Changed Women's Sexual Fantasies is a 1991 book by Nancy Friday. In it she continues her research into women's sexual fantasies, following on from My Secret Garden and Forbidden Flowers. The book is divided into three sections: A "Report from the erotic interior", a section on masturbation, and the fantasies themselves. The fantasies in turn are divided into three chapters:

1. Seductive, Sometimes Sadistic, Sexually Controlling Women
2. Women With Women
3. Insatiable Women: The Cry For "More!"
