= Multiple subpial transection =

Surgical treatment modality for epilepsy

Multiple subpial transections is a surgical treatment modality for epilepsy used in scenarios wherein epileptogenic brain regions (from where partial seizures originate) cannot be removed safely. The surgeon makes a series of shallow cuts (transections) into the brain's cerebral cortex. These cuts are thought to interrupt some fibers that connect neighboring parts of the brain, but they do not appear to cause long-lasting impairment in the critical functions that these areas perform.

Multiple subpial transections can help to reduce or eliminate seizures arising from vital functional areas of the cerebral cortex. This procedure has been successful in an unusual type of epilepsy called Landau-Kleffner syndrome, at least for a limited time.

Bleeding at the site of the transection is possible, but the procedure is generally well tolerated. Major complications appear to be rare. Transections in language areas of the brain may mildly impair the language function served by that area.

== Uses ==
Epilepsy surgery is reserved for people whose seizures are not well controlled by seizure medicines (this situation is sometimes describes as being medically refractory). In the past, epilepsy patients were referred for surgery only after they had taken medicine after medicine without success, often for 10 years or more. However, now the definition of medically refractory has changed and surgery is being performed as early as 1 to 2 years after the diagnosis of epilepsy is first made.

In children, the definition of medically refractory is even more individualized to the specific child's situation. Surgery may be considered for some children after only weeks or months of treatment with seizure medicines.

In general, a person is considered to be a potential candidate for surgery if adequate trials of two first-line seizure medicines (ones that are commonly effective in controlling the type of seizures the person is experiencing) and one two-drug combination all have failed to control the seizures. A trial of a medication is considered adequate when it has been increased gradually to the maximum dosage that does not cause serious side effects and then is given for a long enough period. If the person has frequent seizures, any improvement will be obvious after a short time. However, if the seizures generally occur far apart it may take months to determine whether the time between seizures is increasing.

At some epilepsy centers, patients are offered additional conventional or experimental medications before surgery is considered. However, research suggests that each time a trial of medication fails to control a person's seizures, it becomes less likely that a different medicine or combination will be successful. Since uncontrolled seizures present serious physical risks and social and psychological consequences, the trend these days is to proceed with surgery much sooner than in the past if it seems appropriate for that person.

== Preoperative assessment ==
Success rates for epilepsy surgery are constantly improving, and advances in preoperative assessments are largely responsible. Proper patient selection and a thorough presurgical workup are the cornerstones of surgical success.

If a review of the person's experiences with seizure medicines shows that adequate tests of at least a few different medications have not succeeded in controlling the seizures, then the person may be referred to a specialist for a preoperative (or presurgical) assessment.

The preoperative assessment has two general objectives:

- to maximize seizure control after surgery
- to minimize disruption of normal brain functioning

The number and type of tests that make up the preoperative assessment will depend on the type of surgery being considered. General objectives of the tests include:

- assessing the person's current status
- determining the exact location of seizure activity
- evaluating the surrounding areas of the brain to determine what kinds of problems the patient might experience after surgery.
