= Tom Parry (American football) =

American football coach (1923–2017)

Biographical details
- Born: January 24, 1923; Seattle, Washington, U.S.
- Died: November 21, 2017 (aged 94); Yakima, Washington, U.S.

Playing career
- 1942: Washington State
- 1946–1947: Washington State
- Position: Lineman

Coaching career (HC unless noted)
- 1949: Langley HS (WA)
- 1950–1955: Clarkston HS (WA)
- 1956–1957: Wenatchee Valley
- 1958: Montana (assistant)
- 1959–1960: Washington State (assistant)
- 1961–1965: Wenatchee Valley
- 1966–1982: Central Washington
- 1983: Los Angeles Express (assistant)
- 1984–1986: Central Washington
- 1989: Yakima Valley

Head coaching record
- Overall: 95–91–4 (college)
- Tournaments: 1–1 (NAIA D-I playoffs)

Accomplishments and honors

Championships
- 2 WJCC (1956–1957); 6 Evergreen (1968, 1970, 1972, 1973, 1982, 1984)

Awards
- 5× NAIA District 1 Coach of the Year (1968, 1970, 1972, 1973)

Tom Jones "Black Tom" Parry Jr. (January 24, 1923 – November 21, 2017) was an American football coach. He was the head football coach at Central Washington University in Ellensburg, Washington, from 1966 to 1982 and 1984 to 1986.

== Early years ==
Parry was born in Seattle in 1923. He attended Queen Anne High School, graduating in 1941. He attended Washington State College (now known as Washington State University) where he was a lineman for the Washington State Cougars football team in 1942, 1946, and 1947. His college career was interrupted by service in the United States Navy during World War II. He was co-captain of the 1947 Washington State Cougars football team. He received a degree in physical education from Washington State in 1949.

== Coaching career ==
Parry began his coaching career at Langley High School on Whidbey Island in 1949. He then coached at Clarkston High School in Clarkston, Washington from 1950 to 1955.

Parry was the head football coach at Wenatchee Valley College in Wenatchee, Washington from 1956 to 1957 and again from 1961 to 1965, compiling a record of 30–22–3. He also held assistant coaching positions at the University of Montana in 1958 and at Washington State in 1959 and 1960.

Parry was hired as the head football coach at Central Washington University in March 1966. He served in that role from 1966 to 1982 and 1984 to 1986, compiling a career college football coaching record of 95–91–4. He won the NAIA District 1 Coach of the Year award five times, and his teams won six conference championships. He resigned as Central Washington's head coach at the end of the 1986 season.

Parry left Central Washington for one year in 1983 to serve as an assistant coach of the Los Angeles Express of the United States Football League (USFL).

After retiring from Central Washington, he returned to head coaching at Yakima Valley College in 1989. He also served as an assistant coach briefly at Washington State.

== Later years ==
Parry died in 2017 in Yakima, Washington, at age 94.

== Head coaching record ==
=== College ===
Year	Team	Overall	Conference	Standing	Bowl/playoffs
Central Washington Wildcats (Evergreen Conference) (1966–1982)
1966	Central Washington	2–5–2	2–2–2	3rd	
1967	Central Washington	4–6	3–3	2nd	
1968	Central Washington	6–3	6–0	1st	
1969	Central Washington	3–6	3–3	3rd	
1970	Central Washington	7–3	5–0	1st	
1971	Central Washington	4–6	2–3	5th	
1972	Central Washington	9–1	6–0	1st	
1973	Central Washington	7–2	5–1	1st	
1974	Central Washington	3–5–1	3–2–1	T–2nd	
1975	Central Washington	5–4	4–2	2nd	
1976	Central Washington	3–6	3–3	4th	
1977	Central Washington	3–6	3–3	4th	
1978	Central Washington	0–9 (Note: Central Washington finished the 1978 season with an overall record of 3–6 and a mark of 3–3 in conference play, tying for third place in the Evergreen Conference. In January 1979, the Wildcats forfeited their three wins from 1978 because of ineligible player.)	0–6	7th	
1979	Central Washington	1–8–1	1–4	T–5th	
1980	Central Washington	2–7	1–4	5th	
1981	Central Washington	6–3	2–2	3rd	
1982	Central Washington	8–2	4–1	T–1st	
Central Washington Wildcats (Evergreen Conference) (1984)
1984	Central Washington	11–2	8–0	1st	L NAIA Division I Semifinal
Central Washington Wildcats (Columbia Football League) (1985–1986)
1985	Central Washington	5–4	3–3	T–3rd (Northern)	
1986	Central Washington	6–3	4–2	T–2nd (Northern)	
Central Washington:		95–91–4	68–41–3		
Total:		95–91–4			
National championship Conference title Conference division title or championship game berth

=== Junior college ===
Year	Team	Overall	Conference	Standing	Bowl/playoffs
Wenatchee Valley Knights (Washington Junior College Conference) (1956–1957)
1956	Wenatchee Valley		6–1	1st	
1957	Wenatchee Valley		6–1	T–1st	
Wenatchee Valley Knights (Washington Junior College Conference) (1961–1965)
1961	Wenatchee Valley	4–4	2–4	T–5th	
1962	Wenatchee Valley	8–0–2	4–0–2	2nd	
1963	Wenatchee Valley	2–7	1–4	T–5th	
1964	Wenatchee Valley	3–5	2–4	5th	
1965	Wenatchee Valley	4–3–1	4–2	2nd	
Wenatchee Valley:			25–16–2		
Yakima Valley Indians (Northwest Athletic Association of Community Colleges) (1989)
1989	Yakima Valley	2–7	0–6	4th	
Yakima Valley:		2–7	0–6		
Total:					
National championship Conference title Conference division title or championship game berth
