= Ulrich Petersen =

Peruvian-born American geologist

- Born: 1 December 1927; Negritos, Peru
- Died: 17 November 2017 (aged 89); Belmont, Massachusetts, U.S.
- Education: National University of Engineers; Harvard University
- Known for: Economic Geology
- Scientific career
- Fields: Geology, Economic Geology

Ulrich Petersen (1 December 1927 – 17 November 2017) was a Peruvian-born American geologist of German descent.

He was born in Negritos, Peru to Georg Petersen and Harriet Bluhme on 1 December 1927. Petersen earned a degree in mining engineering from the National University of Engineers and started work at the Peruvian Geological Survey and the National Institute for Mining Research and Sponsorship. While working for the Cerro de Pasco Corporation, Petersen earned a master's and doctoral degree from Harvard University. Upon completing his doctorate, Peterson taught at Harvard and later became the Harry C. Dudley Professor of Economic Geology. Petersen died at home in Belmont, Massachusetts on 17 November 2017, aged 89.
