= Ralph Richard Grady =

American politician (1927–2017)

Member of the North Carolina House of Representatives from the 9th district
- In office 1977–???

Personal details
- Born: May 12, 1927 Seven Springs, North Carolina, U.S.
- Died: November 25, 2017 (aged 90)
- Party: Democratic
- Children: 2
- Education: North Carolina State University

Ralph Richard Grady (May 12, 1927 – November 25, 2017) was an American politician. He served as a Democratic member for the 9th district of the North Carolina House of Representatives.

== Life and career ==
Grady was born in Seven Springs, North Carolina, the son of Zilphia Ann Smith and Ralph Grady. He attended North Carolina State University and served in the United States Navy.

In 1977, Grady was elected to represent the 9th district of the North Carolina House of Representatives.

Grady died on November 25, 2017, at the age of 90.
