= Dimitri Sjöberg =

Dimitri Sjöberg (21 September 1980 – 23 November 2017 Seinäjoki) was a Romani-Finnish tango singer originally from Kurikka.

== Biography ==
Sjöberg participated in the first round of Tangomarkkinat at age 14 and won it. However he was still too young to progress in the competition. Only when he was age 16 he got to the semifinals and was crowned as the youngest ever tango prince in 1997. He was crowned again as the tango prince in 1998. After this he had a 3-year break from tango competitions, until 2001 when he took part in Tangomarkkinat again. He made it as far as Seinäjoki, but was eliminated before the finals.

== Personal life ==
Sjöberg had big problems with alcohol throughout his entire adult life. He started drinking heavily whilst still a minor in the summer of 1998, when he had achieved success and was touring a lot. He developed a habit of drinking alcohol as liquid courage before performances. After performances he also continued to drink.

Sjöberg was married, but this long-lasting marriage ended in divorce in 2008 due to his drinking. They had 3 children.

Despite the divorce he continued to drink until his Cirrhosis developed into hepatic coma.

Money and health problems still haunted him up to his death. He fell down the stairs at his home, where he broke a few vertebrae. Furthermore, due to his carelessness regarding fire-safety, a fire broke out in his home, as a result his council flat suffered fire damage. Sjöberg had drunkenly attempted to light a cigarette with his stove.

== Discography ==
Own Albums

- Dimitri (1998)
- Tuulen lailla (2001)

Collections

- Tangomarkkinat 10 (1997), inc. "Tummansininen sävel" by Dimitri Sjöberg
- Tangomarkkinat 11 (1998), inc. "Tähdet meren yllä" by Dimitri Sjöberg
- Tähtitaivas 20 hittiä (1998), inc. "Isäsi sun" by Dimitri Sjöberg
- Tanssisuosikit 2 (2004), inc. "Eikö niin" by Dimitri Sjöberg
