= The Groove Tube =

1974 film by Ken Shapiro

- Theatrical release poster
- Directed by: Ken Shapiro
- Written by: Ken Shapiro; Lane Sarasohn; Rich Allen
- Produced by: Ken Shapiro
- Starring: Ken Shapiro; Richard Belzer; Chevy Chase; Buzzy Linhart
- Cinematography: Bob Bailin
- Edited by: Gary Youngman
- Distributed by: Levitt-Pickman
- Release date: June 23, 1974 (New York City)
- Running time: 75 minutes
- Country: United States
- Language: English
- Budget: $200,000
- Box office: $9.4 million

The Groove Tube is a 1974 American independent sketch comedy film written and produced by Ken Shapiro and starring Shapiro, Richard Belzer and Chevy Chase. It features the song "Move On Up" by Curtis Mayfield in its opening scene.

The low-budget movie satirizes television and the counterculture of the mid 1970s. The film was derived from sketches shot on videotape and shown at the Channel One Theater on East 60th St. in New York, a venue that featured R-rated video recordings shown on three television sets, which was a novelty to the audiences of the time. Compilations of sketches from these presentations were taken on tour to college venues, and based on audience responses, the best-received sketches were restaged on film with most of the original actors reprising their roles. The news desk satire, including the signature line "Good night, and have a pleasant tomorrow," was later used by Chase for his signature Weekend Update piece on Saturday Night Live, although in the film he does not appear in that segment.

Randa Haines, who later directed Children of a Lesser God, was script supervisor.

== Sketches ==
- The Dawn of Man - a parody of the opening sequence of 2001: A Space Odyssey, involving ape-like creatures having their first contact with a television set;
- The Hitch-hiker - a hippie-ish hitch-hiker (played by songwriter and the film's soundtrack supervisor Buzzy Linhart) is picked up by a pretty woman who suggests an escapade in the woods, leading to them both getting naked and the hitch-hiker getting a rude surprise;
- Koko the Clown - a mock children's television show in which Shapiro, as the show's Bozo-esque host, reads erotica (specifically a page from Fanny Hill, with promises of the Marquis de Sade the next day) on the air during "Make Believe Time";
- Mouth Appeal - a commercial parodying toothpaste and mouthwash, with an attractive couple getting the whitish product smeared on their lips;
- Babs & Roy Dolls - a commercial parodying the Barbie fashion doll and the decline of her relationship with her male doll partner;
- Kramp TV Kitchen - a parody of sponsored television cooking shows in which Shapiro, as a female baker seen from the shoulders down, mixes and bakes a complicated July 4th "Heritage Loaf" while repeatedly using handfuls of the fictitious "Kramp Easy Lube" brand of shortening (a spoof of Kraft Foods);
- The Geritan Girl - a parody of the vitamin tonic Geritol and its then-controversial ad campaign tag line, "My wife, I think I'll keep her." Chevy Chase plays the narrating husband while adult film actress Jennifer Welles plays the energetic wife;
- Food for Thought - participants in a public broadcasting-style news-of-the-day panel program become distracted from their topic by a steadily increasing offering of coffee and snacks;
- Let Your Fingers Do It - a parody of the '70s Bell System-era AT&T "Walking Fingers" ad campaign for the Yellow Pages telephone directories;
- The Dealers in “Wasted” - a lengthy sketch about a pair of urban drug dealers (Shapiro and Belzer) introduced by a wildly overdone, hip title segment in the style of a police action drama;
- Butz Beer - a parody of '70s beer commercials, with the name "Butz" meant to suggest a portmanteau of Blatz and Schlitz, featuring a takeoff of Schlitz's tag line, "When you're out of Schlitz, you're out of beer;"
- Channel One Evening News - Shapiro portrays a desk anchor reporting on countries and character names based in obscene puns. Segments involve Belzer playing a vain President of the United States heckling a visiting dignitary meant to suggest India's Indira Gandhi played by Shapiro in drag and brownface, and Shapiro as another field reporter visiting a prostitute played by Belzer in drag and blackface;
- Uranus Corporation - a series of commercials interspersed with the news sketch, with the company name pronounced with the stress on the second and third syllables. One Uranus commercial touts the amazing properties of its space-age polymer product "Brown 25" (which looks suspiciously like human feces): "It has the strength of steel, the flexibility of rubber, and the nutritional value of beef stew."
- International Sex Games - a sports program features announcers doing play-by-play over video footage of a couple (played by adult film actors Paul Norman and Mary Mendum) having sex, with the most explicit portions of the act obscured either by distortion or a "Please Stand By" card while the sportscasters describe what the audience cannot see;
- Democratic Mumbles - news footage of '70s Watergate hearings where participants appear to be singing the Clark Terry scat singing nonsense song "Mumbles;"
- I'm Looking Over a Four-Leaf Clover - Chase and Shapiro, dressed in red-and-white striped barbershop music-style outfits, perform the 1927 standard, with Chase singing as Shapiro slaps Chase's head for percussion;
- Safety Sam - a public service announcement warning against venereal disease that covertly (though more and more obviously as the camera zooms in, to humorous and/or shocking effect) used a real human penis as its puppet spokesman;
- Just You, Just Me - Shapiro, dressed in a seersucker suit, exuberantly sings the 1929 standard on the streets of New York to other pedestrians then engages in a choreographed dance number with a policeman.

== Reception ==
On Rotten Tomatoes, the film has a score of 13% based on 8 reviews with an average rating of 3.80/10.

Howard Thompson of The New York Times wrote, "It is indeed wild, and often hilarious. But much of it is blandly dull." Gene Siskel of the Chicago Tribune gave the film 3 stars out of 4 and stated, "Television is such a ripe subject for satire that a new comedy film roasts the medium quite well without taking a poke at such natural targets as bigot-led situation comedies, educational kiddie shows, station editorials, or the 'happy-talk' news format." Kevin Thomas of the Los Angeles Times stated, "Silly, sophomoric and scatological 'The Groove Tube' undoubtedly is for much of its 75 minutes. But so gleeful and zany is it in its sheer outrageousness that the result is virtually nonstop hilarity." John M. Dower of The Washington Post said, "There are sequences in 'The Groove Tube' that are absolutely inspired, and, unfortunately, not describable in a family newspaper; there are others that make you wonder how the same perceptions could think them funny or amusing or even conceivable."

The film was reissued in 1975, 1976 and 1977, and as of July 1, 1977, had grossed $28,572,438.

== See also ==
- List of American films of 1974
