= Don Moore (politician) =

American politician

Don Moore Jr. (November 27, 1928 – November 28, 2017) was an American politician. A member of the Tennessee House of Representatives for two nonconsecutive terms, he later served on the state senate.

Moore attended Chattanooga High School, earned his undergraduate degree from the University of Chattanooga, started work on his law degree at Emory University, and completed his law degree at the University of Tennessee. He furthered his knowledge of the judicial system by graduating from the National Judicial College at the University of Nevada–Reno. His academic career was split by service in the United States Army during World War II and the Korean War. Eventually, Moore returned to his hometown to practice law and made partner at Moore & Moore Contractors. Moore served twice as a member of the Tennessee House of Representatives, from 1956 to 1958, and between 1964 and 1966. Moore then sat in the Tennessee Senate until 1970. He became a Hamilton County Court judge in 1974, and after his term expired in 1982, he returned to private practice.
