= J. Steve Mostyn =

American lawyer

- Born: John Steven Mostyn; March 28, 1971; Perth, Western Australia
- Died: November 15, 2017 (aged 46); Houston, Texas, U.S.
- Other name: Steve Mostyn
- Education: South Texas College of Law
- Occupations: Attorney, philanthropist
- Spouse: Amber Mostyn
- Children: 2

John Steven Mostyn (March 28, 1971 – November 15, 2017) was an American attorney and the founder of Mostyn Law in Houston, Texas. Mostyn and his wife also founded the Glenda Jean Mostyn and Joe E Moreno Educational Foundation, a charity to assist children with special needs.

Born in Perth, Western Australia, Mostyn grew up in a small town in East Texas called Whitehouse. He attended the South Texas College of Law and graduated in 1996.

A few years after law school, Mostyn became a partner at a law firm in Houston. Unsatisfied with his position, he chose to create a "uniquely different Texas law firm." That law firm was Mostyn Law, the name it still carries today.

From the beginning of his launch of his law firm, Mostyn focused on representing clients who had been allegedly wronged by corporate negligence and wrongdoing. He took clients from across the country, not just in Texas.

== Legal career ==
Mostyn's career has focused on mass tort litigation, including hurricane lawsuits and hailstorm lawsuits. Mostyn was "a top Democratic donor who has made a fortune suing insurance companies on behalf of homeowners after hurricanes" according to The Texas Tribune. According to Texas Lawyer, Mostyn "made a name for himself representing victims of Hurricane Katrina and Hurricane Sandy."

When Hurricane Rita hit Texas in 2005, Mostyn and his firm took the cases of homeowners who wanted to file lawsuits against their insurance companies on the belief that the insurance companies had underpaid the homeowners for hurricane damages. Steve filed 1,200 claims from this hurricane. According to Capital Research, "His strategy was to flood the zone, filing such a torrent of cases that insurance companies would be overwhelmed and decide to settle instead of litigate."

After Hurricane Ike in 2008, Mostyn made hundreds of millions of dollars filing lawsuits against insurance companies. He essentially created a "model" for getting victims of weather events to sue insurance companies. During a Texas House committee hearing in 2017 about HB 1774, a weather lawsuit reform bill, "the committee expressed concerns that the Ike model was now used for all major Texas weather events."

Beginning in 2012, Mostyn filed mass litigation following hailstorms in Hidalgo County. As a result, the Texas state legislature considered passing a bill to end "the apparent abuse" of mass litigation.

In February 2017, Mostyn brought three hail lawsuits in Potter County, Texas, against State Farm Lloyds. Mostyn lost all three cases.

=== HB 1774 and hail lawsuit recruitment ===
HB 1774 is a Texas state bill signed into law "aimed at ending weather-related lawsuit abuse" that took effect on September 1, 2017. (Note: HB 1774 caps at 10 percent, down from 18 percent, the penalty an insurance company can be assessed if a court finds that it unlawfully delayed or denied payment to a claimant. The law also requires 60-day pre-lawsuit notices that give insurance companies "time to resolve a claim before being taken to court - preserving the homeowner's right to sue and ensuring that natural disasters aren't used for financial gain driven by personal injury lawyers.") Immediately before HB 1774 took effect, Mostyn used social media and the news to encourage homeowners to file claims for Hurricane Harvey before September 1.

In a March 2017 hearing about HB 1774 before the Texas House Insurance Committee, one of Mostyn's lawyers testified to legislators that "nobody, even her law firm, likes storm-chasing attorneys." Only weeks prior, however, Mostyn's firm set up a booth with the Abogados Manuel Solis immigration law firm at a San Antonio flea market "hustling for clients" for hail lawsuits. The SE Texas Record obtained photos of the booth with fliers that read, "WARNING: Affected by Hail? If you filed a claim and it was not enough, if you never made a claim … Do not settle for it! We could possibly help you! Trust the one who knows how to win!"

== Political contributions and advocacy ==
Mostyn has been politically active in terms of financing both candidates and political action committees that are focused on opposing lawsuit reform. A few of the organizations that Mostyn has funded and supported include the following:

- Back to Basics PAC: Mostyn created this committee in 2010 to oppose the election of then-Gov. Rick Perry and other political leaders and candidates who supported lawsuit reform. The committee has spent over $4.5 million. Mostyn contributed $3,935,181 in 2010, and contributed $377,060 in 2012.
- Conservative Voters of Texas: According to the website The Truth About Steve Mostyn in 2017, "Despite its conservative sounding name, this multi-million-dollar pack was founded by Mostyn associate Mark McCraig in the last election cycle to attack pro-tort reform legislators and candidates."
- For the 2012 cycle, Mostyn contributed $5.2 million to Super PACs. The majority of the contributions went ($3 million) went to Priorities USA Action, supporting Barack Obama.

Mostyn has given campaign contributions directly to political candidates and through a web of political action committees and other groups, which in turn give the money to the candidates themselves.

Mostyn and his wife, attorney Amber Mostyn, believed that there was too much money in politics. They opposed the Supreme Court's Citizens United case and supported campaign finance reform. Together the Mostyns contributed $3 million into the Texas gubernatorial campaign of Democrat Wendy Davis, who was defeated in the 2014 election. They were also co-founders of the Ready for Hillary PAC, a political action committee supporting Hillary Clinton's presidential campaign.

In 2014, Mostyn, who usually contributes to Democratic candidates, gave a large contribution to a police-affiliated political action committee that was donating money to Republican primary candidates. Mostyn wanted to defeat Tea Party-affiliated freshman State Representative Matt Schaefer, a Republican from Tyler, Texas. When asked, Mostyn's spokesman said Mostyn was interested in the race because he is from Tyler.

== Professional activities and memberships ==
- Founding Member, Texas Association of Consumer Lawyers (TACL)
- Former President, Texas Trial Lawyers Association (TTLA)
- Former Vice-President for Political Affairs, Texas Trial Lawyers Association (TTLA)
- Association of Trial Lawyers of America (Honorary Member)
- Texas Trial Lawyers Association (Executive Committee, Board of Directors, Fellowship Member)
- Houston Trial Lawyers Association
- State Bar of Texas (Insurance Law Committee)
- College of the State Bar of Texas

List source:

== Criticism ==
In an April 2017 news article titled "The Steve Mostyn Comedy Show Continues", the Southeast Texas Record called Mostyn a "soliciting-challenged, client-inventing, and claims-inflating gouger of the Texas Windstorm Insurance Association." The article was referring to a legislative hearing held in the Texas House of Representatives in 2010 on the issue of barratry. At the hearing, Mostyn had recommended that prosecutors should take on legal "swindlers."

== Personal life ==
Steve Mostyn was married to Amber Mostyn (née Anderson), whom he met while volunteering with her at the Texas Trial Lawyers Association. The union resulted in a daughter. They are the founders and supporters of The Glenda Jean Mostyn and Joe E. Moreno Educational Foundation. Steve had a son from a previous marriage.

Mostyn died of a self-inflicted gunshot wound to the head on November 15, 2017.
