= Forbidden Flowers =

1975 sequel, Nancy Friday compilation

Forbidden Flowers by Nancy Friday is a 1975 book which explores women's sexual fantasies. It can be read as a feminist analysis of the development of women's fantasies against a background of sexual liberation, or simply as a series of candid, erotic fantasies. It is part of a series of three books beginning in 1968 with My Secret Garden, with this second book, its sequel, begun in 1973. It compares how the fantasies have changed over the five-year period, and notes women's reactions to the first book. A third book, Women on Top, was published in 1991.

In addition to this series, Friday has written a number of other books examining male and female sexuality. These are entitled My Mother/My Self, Men in Love, Jealousy, and The Power of Beauty.

== The origins and uses of women's fantasies ==
Forbidden Flowers is divided into two parts, the first part examining where sexual fantasies come from, looking at the influences of childhood and adolescence, women looking at men, and sexual frustration. The second part looks at the uses of these fantasies, in daydreaming and masturbation, during sex, and making fantasies come true. Each of the eight chapters is illustrated by examples of fantasies from women who have written to Friday.
