= Eric Sun =

Eric Sun was the Engineering Manager of the Entity Data and Ranking team at Facebook. He built Facebook's knowledge graph and oversaw engineering for Facebook's entity graph efforts. Prior to Facebook, he received a master's degree in Statistics and bachelor's degrees in Computer Science and Economics (with honors) from Stanford University. His thesis was supervised by Susan Athey.

He held six issued U.S. patents and published numerous academic papers related to social networks and contagion theory. In 2016, he was diagnosed with glioblastoma. He died on November 23, 2017. Prior to his death, he and his wife Karen Law established the Tarisio Trust: Eric Sun-Karen Law Vuillaume Fellowship, which loans his 1855 violin by Jean-Baptiste Vuillaume to accomplished young violinists for the purposes of community building.
