= Robert Gensburg =

American lawyer (1939–2017)

Robert Gensburg (3 September 1939 – 9 November 2017) was an American lawyer working in the state of Vermont. Gensburg was notable for advancing education-funding reform in Vermont; and for volunteering to assist a captive held in extrajudicial detention in the USA's Guantanamo Bay detention camps, in Cuba.

On January 6, 2000, the House and Senate of the Vermont legislature honored Gensburg with a joint resolution, sending him their best wishes upon his having been diagnosed with leukemia.

== State education funding reform ==
In 1997, as pro bono counsel for the ACLU of Vermont, Gensburg successfully led a lawsuit arguing that the state's school funding formula was unconstitutionally inequitable for children in property-poor towns. This case, Brigham vs. State, resulted in Act 60 (Vermont law), which established Vermont's equalized statewide property tax, intending to achieve a fair balance of educational spending across school districts, independent of the degree of prosperity within each district.

== Guantanamo clients ==
The Montpelier Times Argus reported that Gensburg had great difficulty getting to meet his Guantanamo clients.

There is no law at Guantanamo. There is nothing I have been able to do successfully to get the Army to obey its own regulations."

Gensburg represented Abdul Zahir, several other captives in Guantanamo, and a captive in American custody in Afghanistan. Abdul Zahir was one of the ten captives who faced charges before a version of the Guantanamo military commission that was ruled unconstitutional by the Supreme Court of the United States.

== Wire tapped ==
Gensburg reported on October 2, 2007, that working for a Guantanamo client has led to his firm's phone, mail and email being intercepted. A letter sent to their clients warned them of their belief the firm's communication was being intercepted, and stated:

Although our investigation is not complete, we are quite confident that it is the United States government that has been doing the phone tapping and computer hacking,

Vermont Congressman Peter Welch spoke about the wiretapping of Gensburg's phones, and computers when he was interviewed on Vermont Public Radio's Vermont Edition on Friday November 30, 2007.
