= Gary the Goat =

One half of an Australian comedy duo

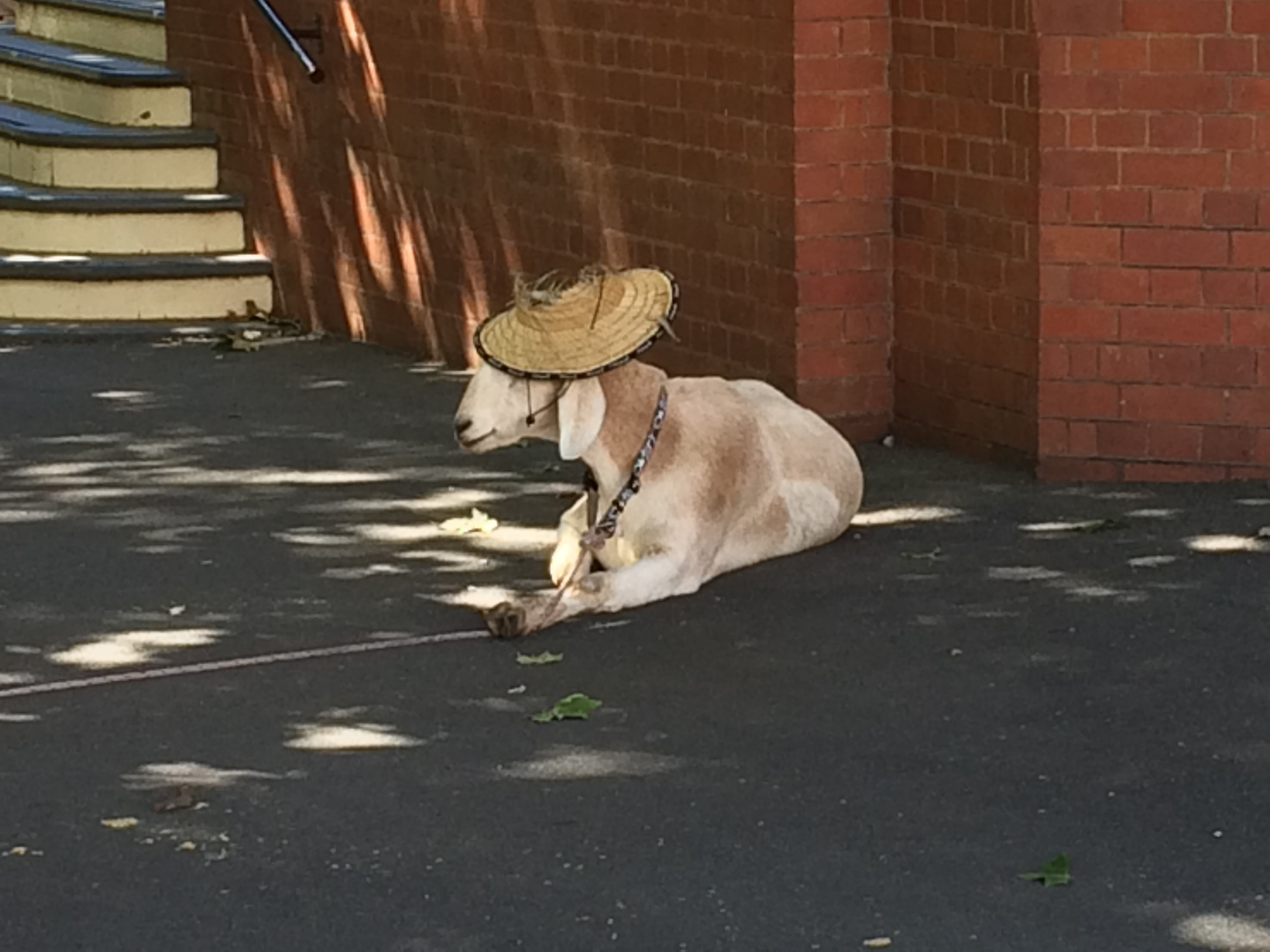
- Gary the Goat outside the Wagga Wagga Court House
- Species: Domesticated goat
- Sex: Male
- Born: 2011
- Died: 16 November 2017 (aged 5–6); Gatton, Queensland
- Years active: 2011–2017
- Known for: Video and live appearances
- Owner: Jimbo Bazoobi

Gary the Goat was a domestic goat owned by Australian stand-up comedian Jimbo Bazoobi. Gary featured in Bazoobi's comedy routines from 2011 until Gary died in 2017. Gary first made headlines in 2012, when Bazoobi received a fine in Sydney because police caught Gary eating vegetation illegally. A subsequent court case led to the penalty being dropped. The pair continued driving between different Australian towns for their show, which proved successful, and Bazoobi created viral YouTube and Facebook accounts for Gary.

== Biography ==
Gary the Goat was bought by Jimbo Bazoobi for a case of beer in Gingin, Western Australia, in December 2011 and from then the pair toured Australia, with some small breaks. At the time, Bazoobi had been selling goat t-shirts and a fan offered him the trade to “make the goat real”.

Gary the Goat and Jimbo often pushed boundaries as to where the goat was taken and where it was permitted, and had been in trouble with councils and even the police, including a threat by a local council to have him impounded at Castle Hill's Goat Track. In 2013 Gary was taken to court by New South Wales police after eating vegetation outside Sydney's Museum for Contemporary Art, though the AU$440 fine was dismissed by the judge.

On 16 May 2015 Gary the Goat's YouTube channel was "indefinitely" suspended, though it was reinstated a few days later.

In August 2016, it was discovered that Gary the Goat had terminal arthritis in his legs. Gary subsequently retired from performing with Jimbo at comedy shows in pubs. Gary was put on painkillers in hopes that he would respond to holistic treatment in order to forgo the amputation of his right toe. Gary's toe was successfully amputated in November.

On 16 November 2017, Jimbo announced that Gary the Goat had to be euthanised, after being diagnosed with bleeding from an acute heart tumor. On 22 June 2020, Jimbo announced that Gary the Goat's body had been taxidermied. .
