= Hans Mol =

Dutch-born sociologist (1922–2017)

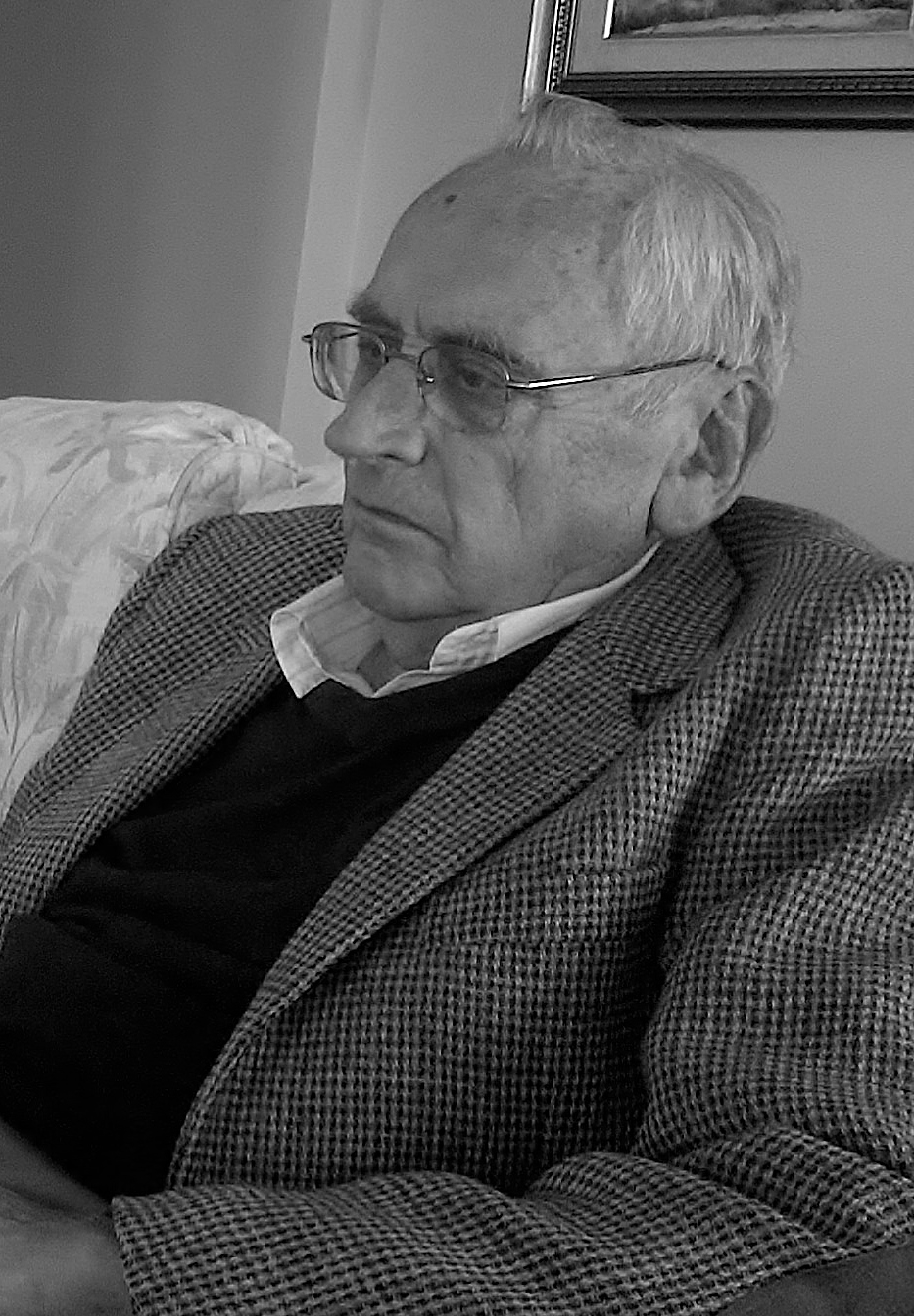
Hans Mol in 2012

Johannis Jacob Mol (14 February 1922 – 26 November 2017) was a Dutch-born sociologist and Professor Emeritus in Religious Studies at McMaster University. He was President of the International Sociological Association's Sociology of Religion Research Committee from 1974 to 1978. In 1978, Mol gave the Paine Lecture at the University of Missouri and was opening speaker at the International Conference for the Sociology of Religion in Tokyo, Japan. In 1985, he was the keynote speaker for the 15th World Congress of the International Association for the History of Religions. Mol is listed as an important figure in the social sciences, receiving dedicated entries in publications such as Encyclopaedia of Religion and Society and Sociology of Religion: An Historical Introduction.

== Biography ==
Hans Mol was born on 14 February 1922 in Rozenburg, Netherlands to Johannis Jacob Mol and Jacoba Jobbina de Koster. After gymnasium in Tiel, Mol attended the University of Amsterdam from 1941 to 1943. However, these studies were interrupted by the Nazi occupation of The Netherlands. Mol refused to sign allegiance to the Nazi party, as all university students were expected to do, and was sent to work in Kleinwanzleben at a sugar factory. There, he and his roommates were eventually detained by the Gestapo for having listened to BBC radio broadcasts on a forbidden radio hidden in their room. Mol was sent to a prison camp called Rothensee for three weeks before spending two years as a prisoner in both Magdeburg and Halle. He was released in March 1945 and immigrated to Australia in 1948 where he resumed his studies, this time in theology at the United Theological Faculty of Sydney University. Mol was ordained into the Presbyterian Church in Australia on 27 February 1952 and married Ruth McIntyre on his birthday in 1953. Moving to the United States in 1954, he completed a Bachelor of Divinity degree at Union Theological Seminary, a joint Master's in Christian Ethics at Union (with Reinhold Niebuhr) and Columbia University (1955), and a PhD in Sociology at Columbia with Robert K. Merton as his supervisor (1960).

Mol's first academic position was at Canterbury University (New Zealand), followed by positions at Australian National University and McMaster University (Canada). He also filled in for Thomas O’Dea at University of California, Santa Barbara in 1969. He retired from McMaster in 1987. In 2010, Mol was diagnosed with Alzheimer's disease. He died at the age of 95 on 26 November 2017.

== Sociological contribution ==
John A. Coleman's 1998 Furfey Lecture of the Association for the Sociology of Religion mentions Hans Mol alongside Max Weber, Ernst Troeltsch, Talcott Parsons, and Peter Berger as "sociology of religion's 'usual suspects,'" and the Sage Handbook of the Sociology of Religion, likewise, introduces its discussion of the relationship of identity to religion with a brief mention of Mol. Indeed, Mol is best known for his identity theory of religion which was outlined in the 1976 book Identity and the Sacred. The book is frequently noted as laying out the first general theory of religion in which the concept of identity is central. In Mol's view identity is a fundamental building block of human experience. Thus, his theory of religion begins with identity as a sense of stability, order, and place in a potentially chaotic environment. He adopts a dialectical model then, pitting the ideal stability of identity against the differentiating and destabilising forces of social life. Religion fits into this dialectic by essentially balancing these two opposed forces. In order to ensure the sustained meaningfulness of one's identity, religion has to remain adaptable to those potentially destabilising forces. As Mol states it, "religion is…the sacralization of identity." By "sacralisation", Mol means that religion is able to fit myths, rituals, and emotion-based commitments into a transcendent worldview that buttresses whatever is providing a sense of stable identity.

Although some scholars argued that Mol was a functionalist, this definition of religion avoided being easily classified as either substantive or functionalist. It also led Mol to question the mid-20th-century secularization thesis because, for him, religion was not relegated to traditional institutions but to an existential drive to protect one's identity by making it sacred and untouchable. Thus, religion would likely remain relevant.

== Works ==
- Race and Religion in New Zealand (1966)
- The Breaking of Traditions (1968)
- Christianity in Chains (1969)
- Religion in Australia (1971)
- Western Religion (editor, et al. 1972)
- Identity and the Sacred (1976)
- Identity and Religion (editor, 1978)
- The Fixed and the Fickle (1982)
- The Firm and the Formless (1982)
- Meaning and Place: An Introduction to the Social Scientific Study of Religion (1983)
- Faith and Fragility (1985)
- The Faith of Australians (1985)
- How God Hoodwinked Hitler (1987)
- The Regulation of Physical and Mental Systems: Systems Theory of the Philosophy of Science (with Eugene D'Aquili) (1990)
- Calvin for the Third Millennium (2008)
