= Rhona Silver =

American businesswoman (1951–2017)

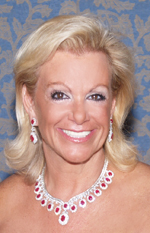
- Born: August 1951
- Died: November 6, 2017 (aged 66)
- Citizenship: American
- Education: Hofstra University School of Law
- Occupation: Former catering hall owner
- Known for: Former owner of the Huntington Townhouse
- Website: www.caterbid.com

Rhona Silver (August, 1951 – November 6, 2017) was an American businesswoman in the catering industry. Until 2007, she owned a large catering hall, Huntington Townhouse, on Long Island. She was co-founder of an catering company that connected people planning a party or event with local caterers.

== Early life and education ==
Rhona Silver was inclined towards the catering business from an early age as her father was a caterer in the Bronx, where she was born. Al Silver catered at the Pelham Parkway Jewish Center and, after moving to Long Island, became the caterer at the East Meadow Jewish Center. She attended Hofstra University School of Law from 1978 to 1980 before taking up catering as a full-time profession.

== Career ==
Silver started with a small catering company which gradually spread to a few cities. In 1997, she purchased Huntington Townhouse, a 148,000-square-foot catering hall, for $7.6 million. She sold it in 2007; however, Silver was subsequently sued by Douglas Elliman Real Estate for commissions on the sale and by her half-brother who claimed he had owned half of the site. In response, Silver sued her former boyfriend, Barry Newman, whom she alleged had organized the sale deal. The case was still in court at the time of her death.

By 2011, Silver and two of her children launched CaterBid.com, an online venue to obtain quotes for event services from multiple suppliers.

Silver was a member of The Committee of 200 (C200), the eWomenNetwork Foundation Advisory Council, and the Young Presidents' Organization (YPO). She was the recipient of Ellis Island Medal of Honor.

== Personal life ==
Silver was married to Elliot Hurdy, co-owner of Huntington Townhouse. She died on November 6, 2017, of a heart attack.
