= Canaan Zinothi Moyo =

Zimbabwean politician

Personal details
- Born: December 3, 1932 Southern Rhodesia
- Died: November 9, 2017 London
- Party: ZANU
- Profession: Politician

Canaan Zinothi Moyo (3 September 1932 – 9 November 2017) was a Zimbabwean politician, in the NDP and ZAPU, after which he fled into exile in Sweden.

== Early life ==
Born in 1932, in his teens he worked as a carpenter and joined the African Artisans Union.

== Politics ==
He then became the provincial chair of the National Democratic Party (NDP). In 1961, NDP was banned and was succeeded by ZAPU - he retained his post and became the provincial chair for ZAPU.

During the liberation struggle, he was imprisoned and detained from 1964 to 1971 before fleeing to Zambia and eventually assigned to be ZAPU representative in Sweden by Joshua Nkomo.

After independence, he along with other ZAPU colleagues were subjected to intimidation & unfair imprisonment by Zimbabwe African National Union charged with undermining the government.

When some of his ZAPU colleagues agreed to sign the Unity Accord in 1987, which saw most of them absorbed into ZANU, he did not join his colleagues & continued his fight against the government. He went on to form his own political party the Liberty Party of Zimbabwe and contested the 1990 elections where the party performed dismally.

Moyo would not join the newly set up Movement for Democratic Change and he migrated to the United Kingdom.
