= Alessandro Leogrande =

Italian journalist (1977–2017)

- Born: 20 May 1977; Taranto, Italy
- Died: 26 November 2017 (aged 40); Rome, Italy
- Education: Sapienza University of Rome
- Occupation: Journalist

Alessandro Leogrande (20 May 1977 – 26 November 2017) was an Italian journalist.

Born in Taranto in 1977, he moved to Rome in 1996, where he graduated with a degree in philosophy from Sapienza University of Rome. During his career, Leogrande wrote for newspapers and magazines such as Internazionale, l'Unità, il Manifesto, Panorama, il Riformista, il Fatto Quotidiano, Una Città, Nuovi Argomenti, and gli Asini. He was a regular columnist for Corriere del Mezzogiorno, editor of Fuoribordo, insert of the weekly Pagina 99 and hosted broadcasts for Rai Radio 3 and Radio Svizzera Italiana. For ten years, he was deputy editor of the monthly Lo straniero.

He made his debut in long form journalism with Un Mare Nascosto (A Hidden Sea 1999), dedicated to his hometown, and in later books he went on investigating the new mafias, protest movements, and the exploitation of foreign agricultural laborers in Southern Italy. He then explored the topic of migration from Africa and the Balkans in his books Il naufragio. Morte nel Mediterraneo (Death in the Mediterranean 2011), Adriatico (Adriatic 2011), La frontiera (The border 2015), and wrote the libretto of two operas: Katër i Radës (2014) on the Tragedy of Otranto, and Haye, Le parole, la notte (2017), a musical voyage in contemporary migrations.

In 2017 Leogrande travelled to Argentine to carry out research for a new book on the relationship between military chaplains and the army during the dictatorship of 1973–83.

Leogrande died in Rome at the age of 40 from a heart attack. In speaking of his son, his father Stefano remembered his work "in defense of the downtrodden and the most fiercely exploited in all sort of settings where abuses were committed, from agricultural labourers to migrants to Argentinian desaparecidos." In 2018 a street was entitled to him in the capital of Albania, Tirana.
