= Susan Linnee =

American journalist (1942–2017)

Susan Linnee (April 25, 1942 – November 6, 2017) was an American journalist who served as an Associated Press bureau chief in Madrid and Nairobi. She was the first American woman to head an AP bureau in Europe.

== Early life and education ==
Linnee was born in Sioux City, Iowa and grew up in St. Louis Park, Minnesota. As a student at St. Louis Park High School, she was a staff member and editor of the school newspaper. She participated in an exchange program through the American Field Service, and spent part of her senior year of high school in France.

Linnee attended the University of Minnesota, graduating in 1962 with a degree in political science. She married a diplomat and lived with him in Geneva, Berlin, New York City, Kigali, and Buenos Aires. During this time she worked as a typist, a secretary, a cook at a US Army base in Germany, and a tea plantation inspector. The couple divorced in the early 1970s.

== Career ==
Linnee began a job as a radio stringer with NBC News in Buenos Aires after answering an ad in a newspaper in 1973. She filled in for chief correspondent Tom Streithorst, giving live radio reports while he was undergoing treatment for an illness.

Linnee joined the AP in 1976, working first in Jackson, Mississippi – where she was the only woman reporting for AP in the state – and then in Houston and New Orleans. She worked briefly for the International Herald Tribune in Paris before returning to the AP in 1980 as a correspondent from Abidjan, Ivory Coast. From Ivory Coast she was responsible for coverage of 22 West African countries.

Linnee became AP's Madrid bureau chief in 1982. She was the first American woman to head a bureau for the AP in Europe. During her 14 years as Madrid Bureau chief, she led coverage of the 1992 Summer Olympics in Barcelona and worked as a correspondent in Sarajevo during the Balkans War. In 1996, she became AP bureau chief in Nairobi. At that post, she oversaw coverage of terrorism in Somalia, Rwanda after genocide, and the 1998 embassy bombings in the region.

Linnee retired in 2004 after eight years as Nairobi bureau chief. She continued to live in Nairobi, where she worked with the International Crisis Group as their East Africa specialist. She also served as a consulting editor and mentor for young journalists at Kenya's Daily Nation newspaper. Through her work at Daily Nation, she expanded her mentorship to many East African newsrooms, including Uganda's Daily Monitor.

== Later life ==
Linnee returned to the United States in 2015, moving back to Minneapolis to be near her family. She got involved with the East African immigrant community and continued to write, including book reviews for the Minneapolis Star-Tribune. She died in Edina, Minnesota in 2017 after a brain cancer diagnosis.
