= Wally McNamee =

American photojournalist

- Born: November 29, 1932; Harrisonburg, Virginia
- Died: November 17, 2017 (aged 84); Fairfax County, Virginia
- Occupation: Photojournalist

External videos
- Interview with McNamee about on his coverage of the Kennedy administration

Wally McNamee (1932–2017) was an American photojournalist. Over his career, which included work for The Washington Post and Newsweek, he covered 10 United States Presidents, the Korean and Vietnam Wars, and the Olympics. He was named the White House News Photographers' Association's Photographer of the Year four times (1957, 1968, 1974, and 1983) and received National Press Photographers Association's highest honor, the Sprague Memorial Award, in 2005. His son, Win McNamee, is a Pulitzer Prize winning photojournalist with Getty Images.
