= Enrique Mendizábal =

Peruvian sports shooter

Personal information
- Born: 25 August 1918 Lima, Peru
- Died: 18 November 2017 (aged 99) Lima, Peru

Sport
- Sport: Sports shooting

Enrique Luis Mendizábal Raig (25 August 1918 – 18 November 2017) was a Peruvian sport shooter who competed in the 1948 Summer Olympics.
