= Jean-Pierre Pujol =

French politician and teacher

Jean-Pierre Pujol (30 June 1941 – 8 November 2017) was a French politician and teacher.

He was born in Condom, Gers and worked as a schoolteacher before entering politics. Pujol was mayor of Nogaro between 1989 and 2008. He was elected to the National Assembly and served from 2001 to 2002, succeeding Claude Desbons, who had died in office. Pujol was named an alternate assemblyman for Philippe Martin in 2002 and 2007. Pujol won election to the Gers General Council in 1994 and stepped down in 2015. Between 2013 and 2014, Pujol was council president.

Pujol died at the age of 76 on 8 November 2017, at a hospital in Mont-de-Marsan.
