= Gary Ingram =

American politician

Member of the Idaho House of Representatives
- In office 1973–1980

Member of the Idaho House of Representatives
- In office 2012–2012

Personal details
- Born: November 29, 1933 St. Paul, Minnesota, U.S.
- Died: November 30, 2017 (aged 84) Coeur d'Alene, Idaho, U.S.
- Party: Republican
- Occupation: Politician

Gary Ingram (November 29, 1933 – November 30, 2017) was an American politician who served in the Idaho House of Representatives from 1973 to 1980, and again in 2012.

Ingram moved to Coeur d'Alene, Idaho from St. Paul, Minnesota in 1961. He was first elected to the Idaho House of Representatives in 1973. The next year, Ingram authored the Open Meetings Law. He won reelection three times and left office in 1980. Ingram served a portion of representative Kathleen Sims' term in 2012. He died of cancer on November 30, 2017, at the age of 84.
