= Landau–Kleffner syndrome =

- Other names: Infantile acquired aphasia, acquired epileptic aphasia, aphasia with convulsive disorder
- Landau–Kleffner syndrome is characterized by aphasia and an abnormal EEG
- Specialty: Neurology, psychiatry
- Symptoms: Aphasia, inattention, hyperactivity, aggression, anxiety, seizures
- Usual onset: Ages 3 to 7
- Duration: Lifelong
- Treatment: Speech therapy, medication
- Medication: Anticonvulsants, corticosteroids
- Prognosis: Variable
- Frequency: 0.0005%

Landau–Kleffner syndrome (LKS), also called infantile acquired aphasia, acquired epileptic aphasia, or aphasia with convulsive disorder, is a rare neurological syndrome that develops during childhood.

It is named after William Landau and Frank Kleffner, who characterized it in 1957 with a diagnosis of six children.

== Signs and symptoms ==
Landau–Kleffner syndrome is characterized by the sudden or gradual development of aphasia (the inability to understand or express language) and an abnormal electroencephalogram (EEG). LKS affects the parts of the brain that control comprehension and speech (Broca's area and Wernicke's area). The disorder usually occurs in children between the ages of 2 and 5 years. There appears to be a male dominance in the diagnosis of the syndrome (ratio of 1.7:1, men to women).

Typically, children with LKS develop normally, but then lose their language skills. While many affected individuals have clinical seizures, some only have electrographic seizures, including electrographic status epilepticus of sleep (ESES). The first indication of the language problem is usually auditory verbal agnosia. This is demonstrated in patients in multiple ways including the inability to recognize familiar noises and the impairment of the ability to lateralize or localize sound. In addition, receptive language is often critically impaired, however in some patients, impairment in expressive language is the most profound. In a study of 77 cases of Landau–Kleffner syndrome, 6 were found to have this type of aphasia. Because this syndrome appears during such a critical period of language acquisition in a child's life, speech production may be affected just as severely as language comprehension. The onset of LKS is typically between 18 months and 13 years, the most predominant time of emergence being between 3 and 7 years.

Generally, earlier manifestation of the disease correlates with poorer language recovery, and with the appearance of night seizures that last for longer than 36 months. LKS has a wide range of symptom differences and lacks a uniformity in diagnostic criteria between cases, and many studies don't include follow-ups on the patients, so no other relationships between symptoms and recovery have been made known.

Language deterioration in patients typically occurs over a period of weeks or months. However, acute onset of the condition has also been reported as well as episodic aphasia.

Seizures, especially during the night, are a heavily weighted indicator of LKS. The prevalence of clinical seizures in acquired epileptic aphasia (LKS) is 70–85%. In one third of patients, only a single episode of a seizure was recorded. The seizures typically appear between the ages of 4 and 10 and disappear before adulthood (around the age of 15).

Often, behavioral and neuropsychologic disturbances accompany the progression of LKS. Behavioral issues are seen in as many as 78% of all cases. Hyperactivity and a decreased attention span are observed in as many as 80% of patients as well as rage, aggression, and anxiety. These behavior patterns are considered secondary to the language impairment in LKS. Impaired short-term memory is a feature recorded in long-standing cases of acquired epileptic aphasia. A study of 29 patiends with LKS found that all of the patients experienced difficulty understanding spoken language. 24 patients had severe language difficulties, while 5 had moderate language difficulties. Behavioral disturbances were also reported in 16 patients (Caraballo et al, 2014). These behavioral changes include agitation, restlessness, frustration, emotional outbursts, and difficulty paying attention.

== Cause ==
Most cases of LKS do not have a known cause. Occasionally, the condition may be induced secondary to other diagnoses, such as low-grade brain tumors, closed-head injuries, neurocysticercosis, and demyelinating disease. Central nervous system vasculitis may be associated with this condition as well.

== Diagnosis ==
The syndrome can be difficult to diagnose and may be misdiagnosed as autism, pervasive developmental disorder, hearing impairment, learning disability, auditory processing disorder, attention deficit hyperactivity disorder (ADHD), intellectual disability, childhood schizophrenia, or emotional/behavioral problems. An EEG (electroencephalogram) test is imperative to a diagnosis. Many cases of patients exhibiting LKS will show abnormal electrical brain activity in both the right and left hemispheres of the brain; this is exhibited frequently during sleep. Even though an abnormal EEG reading is common in LKS patients, a relationship has not been identified between EEG abnormalities and the presence and intensity of language problems. In many cases however, abnormalities in the EEG test has preceded language deterioration and improvement in the EEG tracing has preceded language improvement (this occurs in about half of all affected children). Many factors inhibit the reliability of the EEG data: neurologic deficits do not closely follow the maximal EEG changes in time.

The most effective way of confirming LKS is by obtaining overnight sleep EEGs, including EEGs in all stages of sleep. Many conditions like demyelination and brain tumors can be ruled out by using magnetic resonance imaging (MRI). In LKS, fluorodeoxyglucose (FDG) and positron emission tomography (PET) scanning can show decreased metabolism in one or both temporal lobes – hypermetabolism has been seen in patients with acquired epileptic aphasia. Hearing tests (audiometry, for example) are used to rule out hearing loss as the cause of difficulties with language. This is important because children with LKS may appear unable to hear and understand spoken language even when their hearing is intact.

=== Differential diagnosis ===
The table below demonstrates the extensive and differential diagnosis of acquired epileptic aphasia along with Cognitive and Behavioral Regression:

Diagnosis	Deterioration	EEG Patterns
Autistic epileptiform regression	Expressive language, RL, S, verbal and nonverbal communication	Centrotemporal spikes
Autistic regression	Expressive language, RL, S, verbal and nonverbal communication	Normal
Acquired epileptic aphasia	RL, possibly behavioral	Left or right temporal or parietal spikes, possibly ESES
Acquired expressive epileptic aphasia	Expressive language, oromotor apraxia	Centrotemporal spikes
(ESES)	Expressive language, RL, possibly behavioral	ESES
Developmental dysphasia (developmental expressive language disease)	No; lack of expressive language acquisition	Temporal or parietal spikes
Disintegrative epileptiform disorder	Expressive language, RL, S, verbal and nonverbal communication, possibly behavioral	ESES
Stuttering	Expressive language, no verbal-auditory agnosia	Spike-and-wave discharges on the left temporocentral and frontal regions

Note: EEG = electroencephalographic; ESES = electrical status epilepticus of sleep; RL = receptive language; S = sociability

- Continuous spike and wave of slow-wave sleep (>85% of slow-wave sleep).

== Treatment ==
Treatment for LKS usually consists of medications, such as anticonvulsants and corticosteroids (e.g., prednisone), and speech therapy, which should be started early. Some patients improve with the use of corticosteroids or adrenocorticotropin hormone (ACTH) which lead researches to believe that inflammation and vasospasm may play a role in some cases of acquired epileptic aphasia. Speech therapy is an important part of treatment because it helps children improve their lost language abilities and work on new communications skills. Treatment may involve multiple healthcare professionals like neurologists and speech pathologists. Early treatment is crucial for improving language and cognitive outcomes and also preserving what hasn't yet been lost.

A controversial treatment option involves a surgical technique called multiple subpial transection in which multiple incisions are made through the cortex of the affected part of the brain beneath the pia mater, severing the axonal tracts in the subjacent white matter. The cortex is sliced in parallel lines to the midtemporal gyrus and perisylvian area to attenuate the spread of the epileptiform activity without causing cortical dysfunction. There is a study by Morrell et al. in which results were reported for 14 patients with acquired epileptic aphasia who underwent multiple subpial transections. Seven of the fourteen patients recovered age-appropriate speech and no longer required speech therapy. Another 4 of the 14 displayed improvement of speech and understanding instructions given verbally, but they still required speech therapy. Eleven patients had language dysfunction for two or more years. Another study by Sawhney et al. reported improvement in all three of their patients with acquired epileptic aphasia who underwent the same procedure.

Various hospitals contain programs designed to treat conditions such as LKS like the Children's Hospital Boston and its Augmentative Communication Program. It is known internationally for its work with children or adults who are non-speaking or severely impaired. Typically, a care team for children with LKS consists of a neurologist, a neuropsychologist, and a speech pathologist or audiologist. Some children with behavioral problems may also need to see a child psychologist and a psychopharmacologist. Speech therapy begins immediately at the time of diagnosis along with medical treatment that may include steroids and anti-epileptic or anti-convulsant medications.

Patient education has also proved to be helpful in treating LKS. Teaching them sign language is a helpful means of communication and if the child was able to read and write before the onset of LKS, that is extremely helpful too.

== Prognosis ==
The prognosis for children with LKS varies. Some affected children may have a permanent severe language disorder, while others may regain much of their language abilities (although it may take months or years). In some cases, remission and relapse may occur. The prognosis is improved when the onset of the disorder is after age 6 and when speech therapy is started early. Seizures generally disappear by adulthood. Short-term remissions are not uncommon in LKS but they create difficulties in evaluating a patient's response to various therapeutic modalities.

The following table demonstrate the Long-Term Follow-up of Acquired Epileptic Aphasia across many different instrumental studies:.

Study	Number of Patients	Mean Follow-up, y	Number of Patients with Normal or Mild Language Problems
Soprano et al. (1994)	12	8	3
Mantovani and Landau (1980)	9	22	6
Paquier (1992)	6	8.1	3
Rossi (1999)	11	9.7	2
Robinson et al. (2001)	18	5.6	3
Duran et al. (2009)	7	9.5	1
Total	63		18 (28.6%)

Lower rates of good outcomes have been reported, ranging between 14% and 50%. Duran et al. used 7 patients in his study (all males, aged 8–27 years of age) with LKS. On long-term followup, most of his patients did not demonstrate total epilepsy remission and language problems continued. Out of the seven patients, one reported a normal quality of life while the other six reported aphasia to be a substantial struggle. The Duran et al. study is one of few that features long-term follow up reports of LKS and utilizes EEG testing, MRIs, the Vineland Adaptive Behavior Scales, the Connor's Rating Scales-revised, and a Short-Form Health Survey to analyze its patients.

Globally, more than 200 cases of acquired epileptic aphasia have been described in the literature. Between 1957 and 1980, 81 cases of acquired epileptic aphasia were reported, with 100 cases generally being diagnosed every 10 years.
