= Ken Shapiro =

American writer, producer, and actor

Kenneth Roy Shapiro (June 5, 1942 – November 18, 2017) was an American writer, producer, director and child actor. Most notably, he played the role of the "Kid" on The Buick-Berle Show. He was a regular on George Scheck's "Star Time" Kids Show (1951–52) working under the name "Kenny Sharpe", along with another budding star Connie Francis. Shapiro also directed several titles, including The Groove Tube (1974) and Modern Problems (1981). He died in November 2017 at the age of 75 from cancer.
