= Alan John Peters =

American violinist, producer and impresario

- Born: 5 May 1936
- Died: November 2, 2017 (aged 81)
- Occupations: Violinist, Producer & Impresario
- Instrument: Violin

Alan John Peters (April 5, 1936 – November 2, 2017) was an American violinist, producer and impresario. He was the director and member of the Royal Philharmonic Orchestra.

== Career ==
Peters began his music career playing violin for the US military. He was the director and member of the Royal Philharmonic Orchestra. He was a member of the London Philharmonic Orchestra and the Philharmonia Orchestra. He served as the leader of the Royal Opera House and Ballet Orchestra.

Peters recorded several classical and non-classical music tracks. He served as a producer with the Royal Philharmonic Orchestra from 1992 until 1997. He worked with notable conductors such as Yehudi Menuhin, Carl Davis, and Charles Mackerras. He recorded Peter and the Wolf with Sir John Gielgud. He collaborated with notable musicians including Paul McCartney, Dionne Warwick, Shirley Bassey, Tom Jones, and others.

== Death ==
Peters died on November 2, 2017, after suffering a period of ill health.
