= Eugene Domack =

American geologist

Eugene Walter Domack (April 15, 1956 – November 20, 2017) was an American geologist.

Born in Milwaukee to Benjamin and Vivian Domack, Eugene Domack obtained a bachelor's degree from the University of Wisconsin–Madison and completed graduate studies at Rice University. Domack worked for Unocal Corporation before joining the faculty of University of Wisconsin–Eau Claire, then left in 1985 for Hamilton College in New York, where he became Hamilton's first J.W. Johnson Family Professor of Environmental Studies. Domack moved to the University of South Florida in 2013. He died at the age of 61 on November 20, 2017. He was a fellow of the American Association for the Advancement of Science (since 2012) and of the American Geophysical Union, and received a Guggenheim Fellowship in 2004.
