= Leigh Wharton =

Leigh Wharton (October 1, 1924 – November 7, 2017) was a Broadway and Off Broadway actor and director of 33 documentaries on humanitarian subjects in third-world countries, born in West Derby, Bootie, Lancashire England.

During World War II, Wharton joined the Royal Air Force and flew combat missions over Germany, France and The Netherlands He was shot down flying a Spitfire in the English Channel May 1944 off the coast of France and again shot down over North West Germany, crashing on a beach January 1945 for four days, making his way to Denmark before being rescued. He was awarded R.A.F. Pilot's “Wings” and U.S. Navy “Wings” (1944).

After graduating from London University with a First Class Honors degree in economics, Wharton moved to Montreal, Quebec, Canada, in 1953, where he ran the first vegetarian health food restaurant "The Salad Man". He moved to New York in 1955 and studied acting with Lee Strasberg at the Actors Studio, New York, appearing in four Broadway productions: Marat Sade as Marat, The Hostage as Pat, Beyond the Fringe 12 roles and Lorenzo as Ricardo, nine Off-Broadway productions: Camino Real as Lord Byron, Waltz of the Toreadors as General St. Pe, John Gabriel Borkman as John Gabriel Borkman, Design for Living as Otto, Sgt. Musgrave's Dance as Gunner Attercliffe, Death of Satan as George Bernard Shaw, The Merry Wives of Windsor as Ford, The French Way as Performer, Beyond the Fringe in Birmingham Repertory, Julius Caesar as Julius Caesar, Othello as Iago, Good Women of Setzuan as Wong and A Doll's House as Torvald Helmer He was in fourteen television productions. He appeared in The Crucible in 1967 starring opposite Ingrid Bergman, George C. Scott, and Melvyn Douglas. He was in three movies, Roses in December playing Larry Turner the lead, Season of Angels playing F/Lt Carter, and Semmelweis. He became a US citizen in 1965.

Wharton was director of more than 33 documentaries. His production Edge of Survival, which he directed, wrote and photographed, won the World Hunger Media Award and was a finalist in the American Film Festival, and aired four times as a PBS-TV Prime-Time Special Program 1979. The film was also honored at the Museum of Modern Art
