= Thomas Hansell =

English cricketer

Thomas Michael Geoffrey Hansell (24 August 1954 – 14 November 2017) was an English first-class cricketer active from 1975 to 1977 who played for Surrey. Willetton District Cricket Club has constructed batting nets to honor and celebrate the life of Hansell and his influence on their club.

== Batting ==
Hansell batted left-handed. Throughout his first-class career, he had 319 runs.

Batting and Fielding Averages
	Mat	Inns	NO	Runs	HS
First-class	14	26	5	319	54
List	7	4	0	47	26

== Bowling ==
Hansell's bowling style was slow left-arm orthodox.

Bowling Averages
	Mat	Balls	Runs	Wkts
First-Class	14	24	0	0
List A	7	-	-	-
