= Nancy Friday =

American author (1933–2017)

- Born: Nancy Colbert Friday; August 27, 1933; Pittsburgh, Pennsylvania, U.S.
- Died: November 5, 2017 (aged 84); New York City, U.S.
- Education: Wellesley College
- Spouses: Bill Manville (m. 1967; div. 1986); Norman Pearlstine (m. 1988; div. 2005)
- Writing career
- Subjects: Female sexuality and liberation

Nancy Colbert Friday (August, 1933 – November 5, 2017) was an American author who wrote on the topics of female sexuality and liberation. Her writings argue that women have often been reared under an ideal of womanhood, which was outdated and restrictive, and largely unrepresentative of many women's true inner lives, and that openness about women's hidden lives could help free women to truly feel able to enjoy being themselves. She asserts that this is not due to deliberate malice, but due to social expectation, and that for women's and men's benefit alike it is healthier that both be able to be equally open, participatory and free to be accepted for who and what they are.

== Biography ==
Nancy Friday was born in Pittsburgh, Pennsylvania, the daughter of Walter F. Friday and Jane Colbert Friday (later Scott). She grew up in Charleston, South Carolina, and attended the only local girls' college-preparatory school, Ashley Hall, where she graduated in 1951. She then attended Wellesley College in Massachusetts, where she graduated in 1955. She worked briefly as a reporter for the San Juan Island Times and subsequently established herself as a magazine journalist in New York City, England, and France before turning to writing full-time.

Her first book, published in 1973, was My Secret Garden, a compilation of her interviews with women discussing their sexuality and fantasies, which became a bestseller. Friday regularly returned to the interview format in her subsequent books on themes ranging from mothers and daughters to sexual fantasies, relationships, jealousy, envy, feminism, BDSM, and beauty. After the publication of The Power of Beauty (released in 1996, and re-released under the tile of Our Looks/Our Lives in 1999), she wrote little, contributing an interview of porn star Nina Hartley to XXX: 30 Porn Star Portraits, a book published in 2004 by photographer Timothy Greenfield-Sanders, with her final book being Beyond My Control: Forbidden Fantasies in an Uncensored Age, published in 2009.

Throughout the 1980s and early 1990s she was a frequent guest on television and radio programs such as Politically Incorrect, Oprah, Larry King Live, Good Morning America, and NPR's Talk of the Nation. She also created a website in the mid-1990s, to complement the publication of The Power of Beauty. Initially conceived as a forum for the development of new work and interaction with her diverse audience, it was not updated in later years.

Despite the judgment of Ms. magazine ("This woman is not a feminist"), she predicated her career on the belief that feminism and the appreciation of men are not mutually exclusive concepts.

== Literary motivation ==
Friday explained how "in the late 1960s I chose to write about women's sexual fantasies because the subject was unbroken ground, a missing piece of the puzzle ... at a time in history when the world was suddenly curious about sex and women's sexuality." The backdrop was a widespread belief that "women do not have sexual fantasies ... are by and large destitute of sexual fantasy."

Friday considered that "more than any other emotion, guilt determined the story lines of the fantasies in My Secret Garden . . . women inventing ploys to get past their fear that wanting to reach orgasm made them Bad Girls." Her later book, My Mother/My Self, 'grew immediately out of My Secret Garden's questioning of the source of women's terrible guilt about sex."

When she returned 20 years later to her original topic of women's fantasies in Women on Top, it was in the belief that "the sexual revolution" had stalled: "it was the greed of the 1980s that dealt the death blow ... the demise of healthy sexual curiosity."

Friday, like other feminists, was especially concerned with the controlling role of the images of "Nice Woman ... Nice Girl"—of being "bombarded from birth with messages about what a 'good woman' is ... focused so hard and so long on never giving in to 'selfishness.'" However, as feminism itself developed "a stunning array of customs, opinions, moral values, and beliefs about how the world of women ... should conduct itself," so too it ran into the difficulty of moralism versus human nature—the fact that "feminism—any political philosophy—does not adequately address sexual psychology" eventually sparking the 'feminist "sex wars" ... from the early 1980s" onwards. Against that backdrop, Friday's evidential and empirical concerns continue to address the "open question of how many of their sexual freedoms the young women ... will retain, how deeply they have incorporated them."

=== Criticism ===
"Critics have labeled Friday's books unscientific, because the author solicited responses", thus potentially biasing the contributor pool.

My Secret Garden was greeted by a "salvo from the media accusing me of inventing the whole book, having made up all the fantasies"; My Mother/My Self was "initially ... violently rejected by both publishers and readers"; while Women on Top "was heavily criticized for its graphic and sensational content."

Friday was also criticized for her reaction to the Clinton–Lewinsky scandal affair, which critics interpreted as sexist. The journalist Jon Ronson wrote "In February 1998, the feminist writer Nancy Friday was asked by the New York Observer to speculate on Lewinsky's future. 'She can rent out her mouth,' she replied."

== Personal life ==
Friday married novelist Bill Manville in 1967, separated from him in 1980, and divorced him in 1986. Her second husband was Norman Pearlstine, formerly the editor in chief of Time Inc. They were married at the Rainbow Room in New York City on July 11, 1988, and divorced in 2005.

In 2011, Friday sold her home in Key West and moved to New York City.

Nancy Friday died at her home in Manhattan from complications of Alzheimer's disease on November 5, 2017, at the age of 84.

== Bibliography ==
- My Secret Garden, Simon & Schuster, 1973
- Forbidden Flowers, Simon & Schuster, 1975
- My Mother, My Self: The Daughter's Search for Identity, Delacorte Press, 1977
- Men in Love, Men's Sexual Fantasies: The Triumph of Love Over Rage, Dell Publishing, 1980
- Jealousy, M. Evans & Co., 1985
- Women on Top: How Real Life Has Changed Women's Sexual Fantasies, Simon & Schuster, 1991
- The Power of Beauty, HarperCollins Publishers, 1996. Republished as Our Looks, Our Lives: Sex, Beauty, Power and the Need to be Seen, HarperCollins Publishers, 1999
- Beyond My Control: Forbidden Fantasies in an Uncensored Age, Sourcebooks, Inc., 2009

== See also ==
- Jenny Diski
- Betty Dodson
- Carol Gilligan
- Sex-positive feminism
