= Peggy Vining =

American poet laureate

Peggy Sue Vining (March 4, 1929 – November 26, 2017; née Peggy Sue Caudle) was the sixth poet laureate of the American state of Arkansas, appointed to the position by Governor Mike Huckabee in 2003.
