= Modern Problems =

1981 American science fiction comedy film by Ken Shapiro

- Theatrical release poster
- Directed by: Ken Shapiro
- Written by: Ken Shapiro; Tom Sherohman; Arthur Sellers
- Produced by: Alan Greisman; Michael Shamberg
- Starring: Chevy Chase; Patti D'Arbanville; Mary Kay Place; Brian Doyle-Murray; Nell Carter; Dabney Coleman
- Cinematography: Edmond L. Koons
- Edited by: Michael Jablow
- Music by: Dominic Frontiere
- Distributed by: 20th Century Fox
- Release date: December 25, 1981
- Running time: 89 minutes
- Country: United States
- Language: English
- Budget: $8 million
- Box office: $26.2 million

Modern Problems is a 1981 American science fiction comedy film written and directed by Ken Shapiro and starring Chevy Chase, Patti D'Arbanville, and Dabney Coleman. The film grossed $26.2 million on an $8 million budget.

== Plot ==
Max Fiedler is an air traffic controller at New York's Kennedy International Airport whose life is slowly going down the drain. His girlfriend, Darcy, has just left him because of his jealousy and negativity. Now, everywhere he goes he seems to run into her with Barry, her narcissistic friend who wants her to be his girlfriend, which drives Max crazy. One night while driving home from a party that turned out to be held at a gay nightclub in Lower Manhattan, a tanker truck spills nuclear waste onto Max's car. Some of it splashes onto him through his open sunroof, temporarily making him glow green before absorbing into his skin. The next day, he notices he has developed telekinesis. Max decides to use his new power to ruin Barry's attempts to woo Darcy. With newfound optimism and confidence, he slowly begins to win back Darcy's love.

Things come to a head, however, when Max is asked to spend the weekend at the summer beach house of Brian, a paraplegic friend and publisher, who is now living with Max's ex-wife Lorraine. Brian has also invited self-confidence author and womanizer Mark Winslow, who immediately has designs on Darcy. Winslow constantly demeans and derides Max, while trying to seduce Darcy (although his egomaniacal bragging and unabashed nudity alienates her). Between no one believing his claims that he can move objects with his mind and Winslow's onslaught of insults, Max grows increasingly depressed until he cracks, proving his telekinetic power to all present at dinner by humiliating Winslow. Finally, despairing that he is a monster, Max climbs onto the roof of Brian's house during an approaching thunderstorm. Max is fortuitously struck by lightning, causing the transference of his powers to Dorita, the voodoo-practicing maid. Now understanding his odd behavior, Darcy forgives Max and he is finally convinced that she truly loves him.

== Cast ==
- Chevy Chase as Max Fiedler
- Patti D'Arbanville as Darcy Carson
- Mary Kay Place as Lorraine
- Nell Carter as Dorita
- Brian Doyle-Murray as Brian Stills
- Mitch Kreindel as Barry
- Dabney Coleman as Mark Winslow
- Tom Sherohman as Waiter

== Production ==
Michael Shamberg and Doug Kenney had a deal with Ken Shapiro to make a film—Kenney had a title, Teenage Communists from Outerspace and Shapiro wanted to make a film about telekinesis. This led to Modern Problems.

Filming started in July 1980. It was Chase's fifth movie in two years following Caddyshack, Seems Like Old Times, Oh Heavenly Dog and Under the Rainbow. "There were problems doing the film," said Chase later. "There were times when I wasn't happy at all with the way things were going. Though I'm bound to say [...] he's come up with a very funny film."

Chase was nearly fatally electrocuted while filming a flying scene involving wires and had to spend several weeks in the hospital.

The film's release was complicated by the 1981 air traffic controller's strike.

The film was recut prior to release to avoid an R rating, which upset the writers, who felt the film's best laughs were lost.

== Reception ==
The film was released on Christmas Day without advance screenings to the press. "I'm really happy with Modern Problems," said Chase prior to release. "I don't pretend to know why Fox isn't showing it to the press. I can only suppose it's because they don't want to take the chance of getting bad reviews."

The New York Times said "it's not that Modern Problems is so bad, though it is incredibly sloppy, but that it's the kind of movie that doesn't need reviews to find its audience. The members of that audience, whose inner clocks are set by their television habits, don't worry much about consistency or point of view. And, having short attention spans, they immediately forget the long dull patches that separate the truly funny sequences."

The Oklahoman wrote, "There are some funny lines and comic situations. But they get fogged in by the film's attempt to mix silly comedy with serious drama. Most of the jokes are too corny to be in a serious comedy."

Metacritic, which uses a weighted average, assigned the film a score of 27 out of 100, based on 4 critics, indicating "generally unfavorable" reviews.

== See also ==
- List of American films of 1981
