= Carl G. Holmes =

American firefighter

Carl G. Holmes (January 6, 1927 – November 24, 2017) was an American firefighter, rising to the rank of assistant fire chief of the Oklahoma City Fire Department. After retiring in 1981 he founded the Carl Holmes Executive Development Institute for Fire Management Training as an alternative to the National Fire Academy, an annual conference at Dillard University in New Orleans, La. He was best known for mentoring thousands of African American firefighters in leadership training from 1981 to 2017.

== Early life and career ==
Holmes was one of the first twelve African-Americans appointed to the Oklahoma City fire department in 1951; the class was carefully selected by the NAACP and the Urban League to staff a firehouse. As black firefighters were entering the profession post WWII, most endured what was a common occurrence for the Jim Crow era, ostracism and racism from fellow firefighters in the station houses upon their integration. They were not allowed to use the common stores found in the firehouse, the assignment of a single bed for their exclusive use and they did not share in purchases made with a common fund for commissary. He and his cohort worked hard to blend in to the semi-segregation of two firehouses to which they were assigned, they were singled out for an award given to the most efficient fire-crews in Oklahoma city. Firefighters gained seniority but were denied the job assignments such as tillerman and special equipment operators which other white firefighters with less experience attained. Frequently they were assigned the heavy chores on trucks like the can-man (assigned to carry the heavy water can while in full gear when responding to fire scenes), or to clean the lavatories and other menial firehouse maintenance duties. During his time as a firefighter, Holmes noted that becoming an officer would be the hardest task he would face. Only two of his class made the transition to management.

== Firefighter and officer ==
Holmes rose through the ranks, overcoming the hostility in the newly integrated firehouses and gained the respect of peers and officers. In 1969 he attended the first conference of the International Association of Black Professional Firefighters in New York City with a contingent from OKFD, protesting harassment and mistreatment in promotions. In 1978 Holmes was promoted to Assistant Chief, the highest ranking attained at the time by an African American. After thirty years as an active firefighter Holmes took issue with the training offered to African Americans whom gained access to the National Fire Academy yet were seemingly bypassed for promotions. Seeing that change would not be in the offing upon retiring in 1981 from the OKCFD he founded the Executive Developmental Institute (EDI) to provide the necessary skills for leadership and advancement. As a motivational speaker he travelled around the country spreading a positive message of inclusiveness; and spoke of the potential to reach the higher rungs of the fire service. Other cities courted him for his professional credentials to work for them, however he had loftier goals. His experiences in overcoming obstacles due to racial restrictions and eventually become an officer by emphasizing people and tactics made him a recognized expert in the field of leadership training.

== Executive Development Institute ==
The Executive Development Institute first held its conferences at Florida A&M University in Tallahassee, Florida. Currently in the 29th year, the national conferences and training are at Dillard University, a HBCU for Liberal Arts in New Orleans. African American course instructors offer a concise look at their area of expertise or management skillset in the fire service; providing the highest level of executive training to prospective promotion candidates from across the country. There are skill intensive pre-assignments for completion prior to the June semester in equipment and modification of processes similar to the NFA coursework. Tuition assistance in the form of scholarships for qualified applicants is made available. The goal is to provide instructors and mentors to guide EDI participants to succeed at becoming Officers and Fire Chiefs within their own departments. In 2009, there were approximately twelve female fire chiefs in the U.S. Five of them attended Holmes' EDI.

== Later life ==
Holmes received the CFSI/Motorola Mason Lankford Fire Service Leadership Award. He was a speaker at IAFC-FRI, Command School, FDIC, Firehouse and his notable fire officer training series at EDI exposed many African American Firefighters to promotion training. He died at his daughter's home in Texas on November 24, 2017.
