= Mary Ann Currier =

American painter

- Born: Mary Ann Ebert; July 23, 1927; Louisville, Kentucky
- Died: November 5, 2017 (aged 90); Louisville, Kentucky
- Known for: Painting

Mary Ann Currier (1927–2017) was an American artist known for her realistic still life paintings.

Currier née Ebert was born in Louisville, Kentucky on July 23, 1927. She attended the Chicago Academy of Fine Arts. Following her graduation she worked in the advertising department for Stewart's department store, drawing home furnishings. In 1949 she married Lionel F. Currier with whom she had three children She taught at the Louisville School of Art. Currier died in Louisville, Kentucky on November 5, 2017.

Her work is in the Crystal Bridges Museum of American Art and the Metropolitan Museum of Art.
