= Andrzej Wincenty Górski =

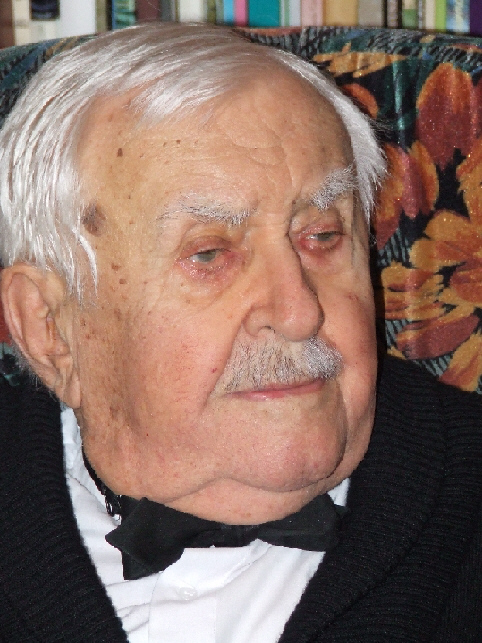
- Born: 15 August 1920; Warsaw, Poland
- Died: 22 November 2017 (aged 97); Poland
- Citizenship: Polish
- Known for: Classification of elements and chemical structural units
- Scientific career
- Fields: Chemistry, Inorganic Chemistry
- Workplaces: Warsaw University of Technology

Andrzej Wincenty Górski (15 August 1920 – 22 November 2017) was a Polish academic who was a professor of Inorganic Chemistry at the Warsaw University of Technology.

Górski was the author of a large number of research articles and two monographs on the systematics of chemical objects, as well as academic textbooks: "General Chemistry" and the two-volume textbook "Chemistry".

Andrzej W. Górski formulated the periodic table of atomic cores as co-ordination centres of chemical structural units and a uniform digital definition of acids, bases, oxidants and reducers which both form a basis for empirically verified, morphological classification of chemical structural units. The main area of scientific activity of A.W.Górski was the systematics of chemical objects.

The classification was verified in a vast range of empirical studies which had been carried out on the nature of mechanisms of thermal decomposition of chemical compounds. In the course of works on the classification of elements and chemical structural units a new version of the periodic chart has been created: Atomic Core Based Periodic System of Elements. This system is compatible with the established classification. It is also free from well known deficiencies which occur in the atom-based periodic system.

== Biography ==
Andrzej Wincenty Górski (the son of Marian Górski, an eminent agrochemist, who was twice rector of the Warsaw Agricultural University) was born on 15 August 1920, in Warsaw. In 1947, he graduated from the Department of Chemistry of the Warsaw University of Technology and received his doctorate degree there in 1952.

He became a professor of Inorganic Chemistry in 1965. Professor Andrzej W. Górski was a Dean of the Department of Chemistry at the Warsaw University of Technology from 1973–80, a member of the Board of the Polish Chemical Society from 1972–79, the Vice-president of the Polish Chemical Society from 1974–76, the representative of the Polish Chemical Society at the Federation of Chemical European Societies – working party in education between 1973 and 1985, the Vice-Chairman of the National Research Project on Special Inorganic Materials from 1981–88 and the Chairman of the National Research Project on Special Inorganic Materials from 1988 to 1990. He died in November 2017 at the age of 97.
