= Huang Shisong =

Chinese meteorologist

- Born: 1920; Jinhua, Zhejiang, China
- Died: 11 November 2017 (aged 96–97); Nanjing, Jiangsu, China
- Education: National Central University; University of Chicago
- Scientific career
- Fields: Meteorology
- Workplaces: Nanjing University

Huang Shisong (Chinese: 黃士松; pinyin: Huáng Shìsōng; Wade–Giles: Huang Shih-sung) was a Chinese meteorologist.

Huang hails from Jinhua, Zhejiang. There he received his initial education, then he was admitted to the Department of Aeronautical Engineer of then National Central University in 1938. However, the infection of one of his fingers limited his manual dexterity, he switched over to geography. As one of first graduates of Meteorology, he received his degree in 1942. Later, he studied at University of Chicago and UCLA, under Carl-Gustaf Rossby and Jacob Bjerknes's guidance successively. For unknown reason, he dropped out his PhD course, returned to mainland China and taught at Nanjing University.

Huang led Department of Meteorology, Nanjing University from 1977 to 1983. He focused on the circulation in low-latitudes and the monsoon circulation of East Asia. He was the Honorary President of Chinese Meteorological Society.

Huang died on 11 November 2017.
