= Rolf Loeber =

Dutch-American psychologist

- Born: June 5, 1942; Hilversum, the Netherlands
- Died: November 6, 2017 (aged 75)
- Education: Queen's University
- Known for: Research on juvenile delinquency
- Spouse: Magda Stouthamer-Loeber
- Awards: American Psychological Association's Distinguished Contribution Award; American Society of Criminology's Lifetime Achievement Award
- Scientific career
- Fields: Criminology; Psychology
- Workplaces: University of Pittsburgh
- Thesis: Discriminative control of therapist performance (1972)

Rolf Loeber (June 5, 1942 – November 6, 2017) was a Dutch-born American psychologist and criminologist who specialized in the study of juvenile delinquency. At the time of his death in 2017, he was Distinguished Professor of Psychiatry, Psychology, and Epidemiology at the University of Pittsburgh, where he had taught since 1984. He was also a Professor of Juvenile Delinquency and Social Development at the Free University of Amsterdam in the Netherlands. Along with his wife and collaborator, Magda Stouthamer-Loeber, he was the co-founder and co-director of the University of Pittsburgh's Life History Studies Program. He was elected to the Royal Irish Academy in 2008.
