= My Secret Garden =

1973 book compiled by Nancy Friday

My Secret Garden: Women’s Sexual Fantasies
- Cover
- Author: Nancy Friday
- Language: English
- Subject: Female sexual fantasies
- Genre: Non-fiction
- Publisher: Trident Press
- Publication date: 1973
- Publication place: United States
- Pages: 361
- ISBN: 0-671-27101-6
- Followed by: Forbidden Flowers

My Secret Garden: Women’s Sexual Fantasies is a 1973 book compiled by Nancy Friday, who collected women's fantasies through letters, tapes and personal interviews. After including a female sexual fantasy in a novel she submitted for publishing, her editor objected, and Friday shelved the novel. After other women began writing and talking about sex publicly, Friday began thinking about writing a book about female sexual fantasies, first collecting fantasies from her friends, and then advertising in newspapers and magazines for more. She organized these narratives into "rooms", and each is identified by the woman's first name, except for the last chapter, "odd notes", which is presented as the "fleeting thoughts" of many anonymous women. The book revealed that women fantasize, just as men do, and that the content of the fantasies can be as transgressive, or not, as men's. The book, the first published compilation of women's sexual fantasies, challenged many previously accepted notions of female sexuality.

My Secret Garden sold at least 2 million copies and was translated to at least 10 languages. It was banned in Ireland.

A sequel, Forbidden Flowers: More Women’s Sexual Fantasies, followed in 1975.

== Contents ==
Chapter One: The Power of Fantasies

Chapter Two: Why Fantasies?

- Frustration
- Insufficiency
- Sex enhancement
- Foreplay
- Approval
- Exploration
- Sexual initiative
- Insatiability
- Daydreams
- Masturbation
- The lesbians

Chapter Three: What do women fantasize about?

- Anonymity
- The audience
- Rape
- Pain and masochism
- Domination
- The sexuality of terror
- The thrill of the forbidden
- Transformation
- The earth mother
- Incest
- The zoo
- Black men
- Young boys
- The fetishists
- Other women
- Prostitution

Chapter Four: The source of women's fantasies

- Childhood
- Sounds
- Women do look
- Seeing and reading
- Random associations

Chapter Five: Guilt and Fantasy

- Women's Guilt
- Men's Anxiety

Chapter Six: Fantasy accepted

- Fantasies
- Fantasies that should be reality
- Acting out fantasies
- Sharing fantasies

Chapter Seven: Odd notes

== The play ==
In 2009, the book was adapted into a full-length stage play Multiple O: Women on Top. Playwright John Sable chose Women on Top (another book by Nancy Friday) as the play's title largely due to its more provocative connotation.

== See also ==
- Forbidden Flowers
