= William Landau =

American neurologist

William Milton Landau (October 10, 1924 – November 2, 2017) was an American neurologist who was a professor of neurology at the Washington University School of Medicine in St. Louis, Missouri. It was within his specialty of stroke and movement disorders that he gained eponymous recognition for the Landau–Kleffner syndrome.

Landau died on November 2, 2017, from natural causes at his home in University City, Missouri. He was 93 years old.

== Works published ==
- Landau WM, Jaffe AS, Wetzel RD (June 2006). "Benefits vs the harms of automated external defibrillator use". JAMA. 295: 2849–50, author reply 2850. doi:10.1001/jama.295.24.2849. PMID 16804150.
- Landau WM (2006). "Pain therapy outdated". Mo Med. 103: 42. PMID 16579303.
- Nelson DA, Landau WM (2001). "Intrathecal methylprednisolone for postherpetic neuralgia". N Engl J Med. 344 (13): 1019.
- Landau WM (1999). "Is cholesterol a risk factor for stroke? Cholesterol-NO". Arch Neuro. 56: 1521–1524.
- Landau WM. "Hypertonus Spasticity, Rigidity" and "Babinski's Reflex, Sign of". Encyclopedia of Neuroscience. Edited by George Adelman, Barry H. Smith, Elsevier Science BV, 1999
- Landau WM. Clinical Neuromythology and Other Arguments and Essays, Pertinent and Impertinent, Futura Publishing Company, Inc,. Armonk, NY, 1998
