= Sansan, Gers =

Sansan
- Commune
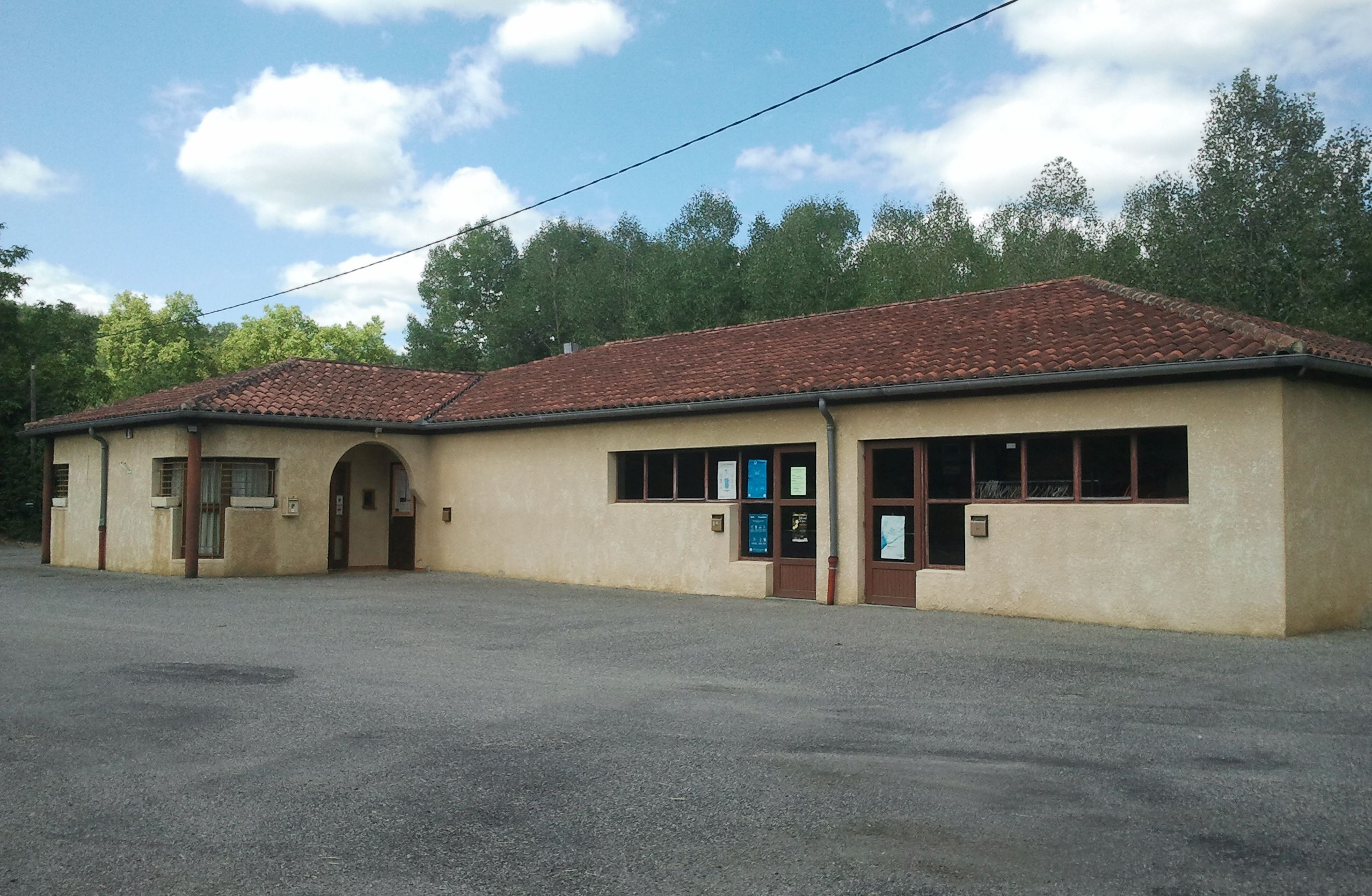
- The town hall in Sansan
- Location of Sansan
- Location within France Location within Occitanie
- Coordinates: 43°31′53″N 0°36′30″E
- Country: France
- Region: Occitania
- Department: Gers
- Arrondissement: Mirande
- Canton: Auch-3

Government
  - Mayor (2020–2026): Jacques Sonilhac
- Area^{1}: 3.7 km^{2} (1.4 sq mi)
- Elevation: 166 m (545 ft)
- Highest elevation: 240 m (790 ft)
- Lowest elevation: 159 m (522 ft)
- Population (2023): 102
  - Density: 28/km^{2} (71/sq mi)
- Time zone: UTC+01:00 (CET)
  - Summer (DST): UTC+02:00 (CEST)
- INSEE/Postal code: 32411 /32260
- ^{1} French Land Register data, which excludes lakes, ponds, glaciers > 1 km^{2} (0.386 sq mi or 247 acres) and river estuaries.

Sansan (French pronunciation: [sɑ̃sɑ̃]) is a commune in the Gers department in southwestern France.

The vicinity of Sansan is known for its Miocene fossil deposits where geologist Edouard Lartet unearthed the jaw of the primate Pliopithecus antiquus in 1837.

== Geography ==
=== Localisation ===
Sansan is located 14 km south of Auch and 4 km north of Seissan, along the Gers river.

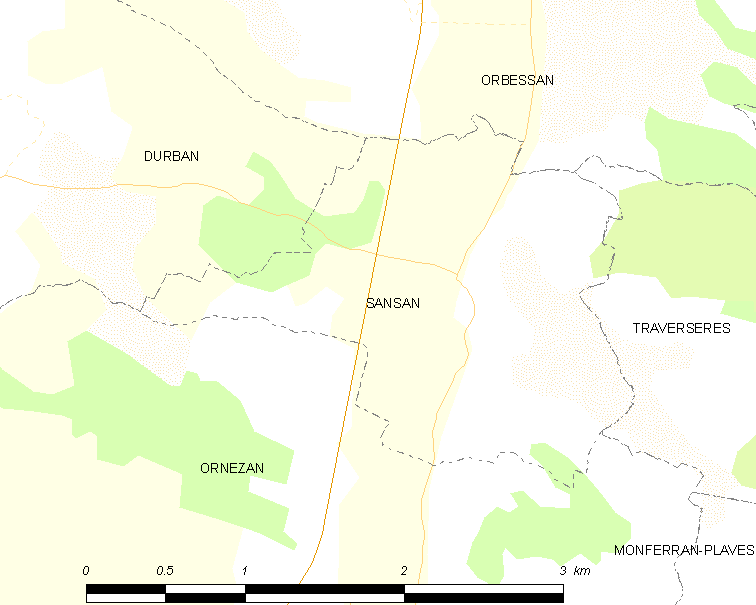
Sansan and its surrounding communes

== Toponymy ==
Sansan finds its origin in the Latin patronymic name Sancianus or Santius, followed by the suffix -anum, designing a property of which a man by this name must have been the owner in the times of Roman Gaul.

== Population ==
Historical population
Year	Pop.	±% p.a.
1968	90	—
1975	81	−1.49%
1982	98	+2.76%
1990	108	+1.22%
1999	89	−2.13%
2007	93	+0.55%
2012	96	+0.64%
2017	99	+0.62%
2023	102	+0.50%
Source: INSEE

== See also ==
- Communes of the Gers department
