= Orbessan =

- Commune
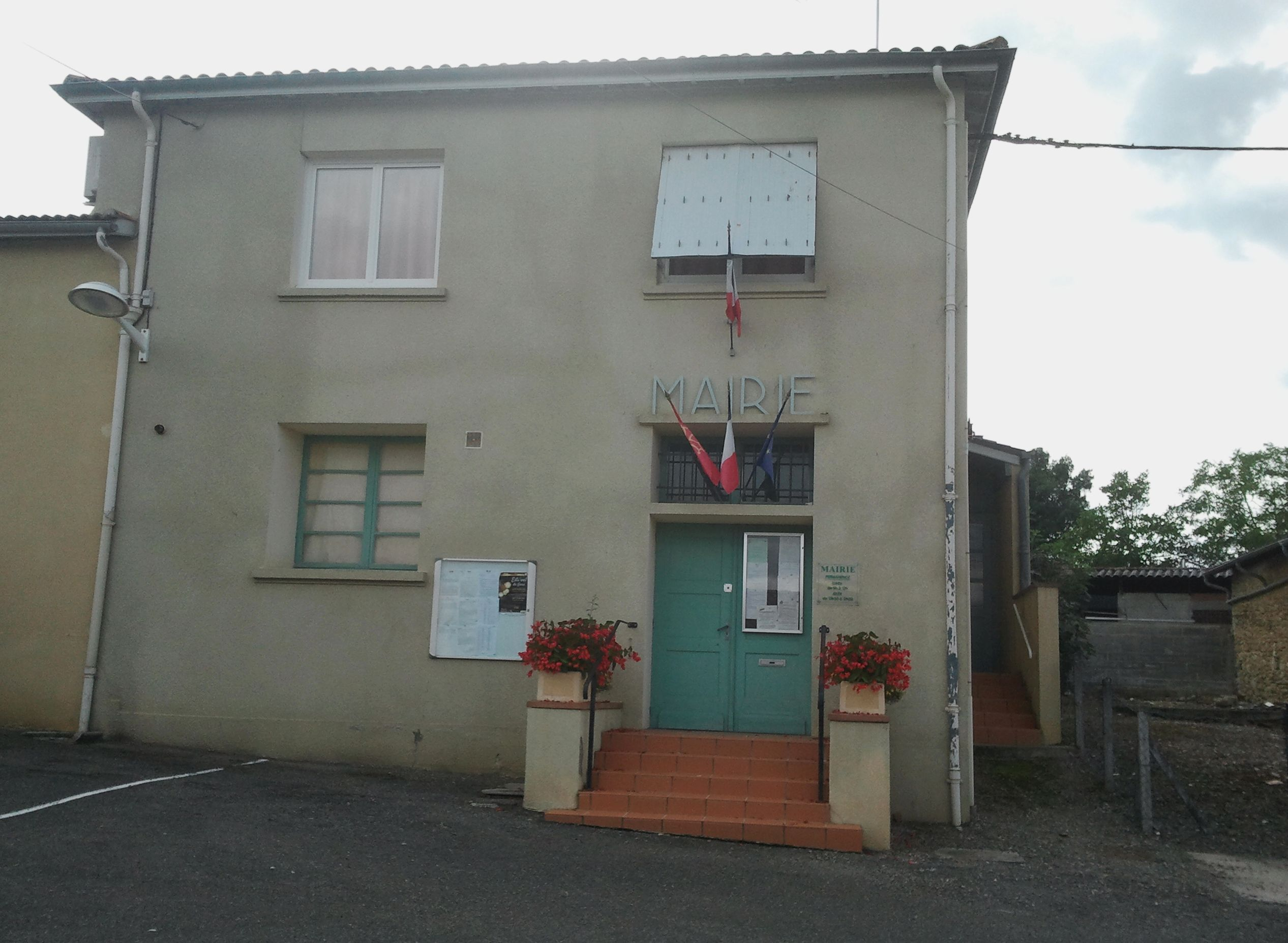
- The town hall in Orbessan

- Coat of arms
- Location of Orbessan
- Location within France Location within Occitanie
- Coordinates: 43°32′41″N 0°36′37″E
- Country: France
- Region: Occitania
- Department: Gers
- Arrondissement: Mirande
- Canton: Auch-3
- Intercommunality: Val de Gers

Government
  - Mayor (2022–2026): Alain Bourdette
- Area^{1}: 8.24 km^{2} (3.18 sq mi)
- Elevation: 168 m (551 ft)
- Highest elevation: 273 m (896 ft)
- Lowest elevation: 152 m (499 ft)
- Population (2023): 269
  - Density: 32.6/km^{2} (84.6/sq mi)
- Time zone: UTC+01:00 (CET)
  - Summer (DST): UTC+02:00 (CEST)
- INSEE/Postal code: 32300 /32260
- ^{1} French Land Register data, which excludes lakes, ponds, glaciers > 1 km^{2} (0.386 sq mi or 247 acres) and river estuaries.

Orbessan (French pronunciation: [ɔʁbɛsɑ̃]) is a commune in the Gers department in southwestern France.

== Geography ==
=== Localisation ===
Orbessan is located 13 km south of Auch and 6 km north of Seissan, along the Gers river.

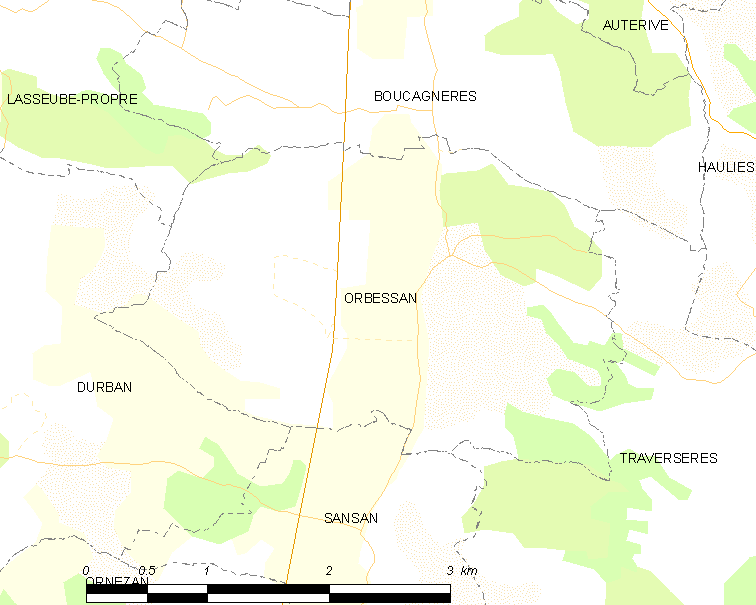
Orbessan and its surrounding communes

== Population ==
Historical population
Year	Pop.	±% p.a.
1968	114	—
1975	104	−1.30%
1982	134	+3.69%
1990	159	+2.16%
1999	213	+3.30%
2007	269	+2.96%
2012	251	−1.38%
2017	288	+2.79%
2023	269	−1.13%
Source: INSEE

== See also ==
- Communes of the Gers department
