= Boucagnères =

- Commune
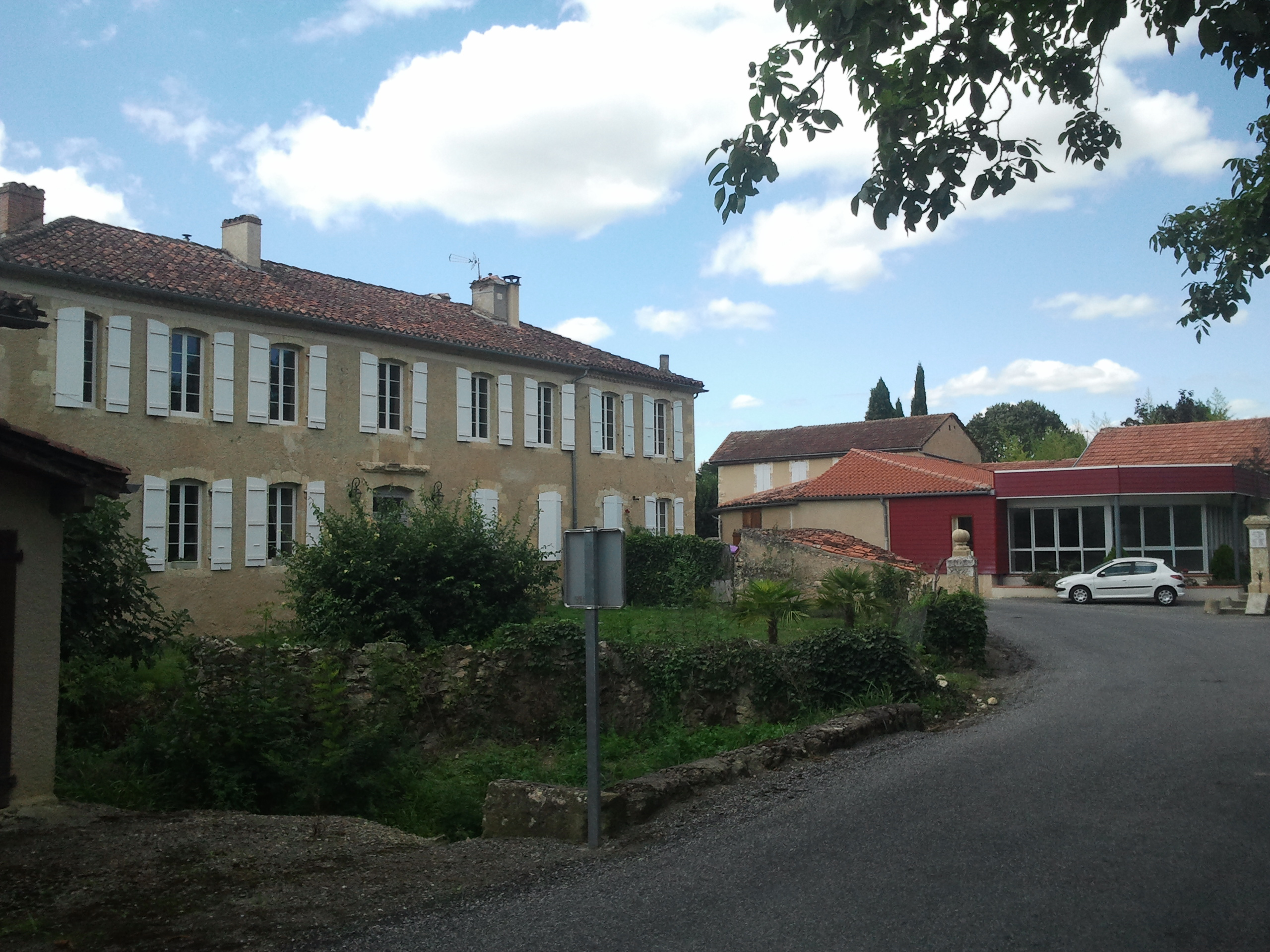
- A view within the village of Boucagnères

- Coat of arms
- Location of Boucagnères
- Location within France Location within Occitanie
- Coordinates: 43°33′48″N 0°36′57″E
- Country: France
- Region: Occitania
- Department: Gers
- Arrondissement: Mirande
- Canton: Auch-3
- Intercommunality: Val de Gers

Government
  - Mayor (2020–2026): Corinne Rousseau
- Area^{1}: 6.16 km^{2} (2.38 sq mi)
- Elevation: 163 m (535 ft)
- Highest elevation: 273 m (896 ft)
- Lowest elevation: 150 m (490 ft)
- Population (2023): 207
  - Density: 33.6/km^{2} (87.0/sq mi)
- Time zone: UTC+01:00 (CET)
  - Summer (DST): UTC+02:00 (CEST)
- INSEE/Postal code: 32060 /32550
- ^{1} French Land Register data, which excludes lakes, ponds, glaciers > 1 km^{2} (0.386 sq mi or 247 acres) and river estuaries.

Boucagnères (French pronunciation: [bukaɲɛʁ]; Occitan: Bocanhera) is a commune in the Gers department in southwestern France. It is situated near the river Gers, between Auch, the capital city of Gers, and Seissan, on the road D 929 in southern direction to Lannemezan.

== Geography ==
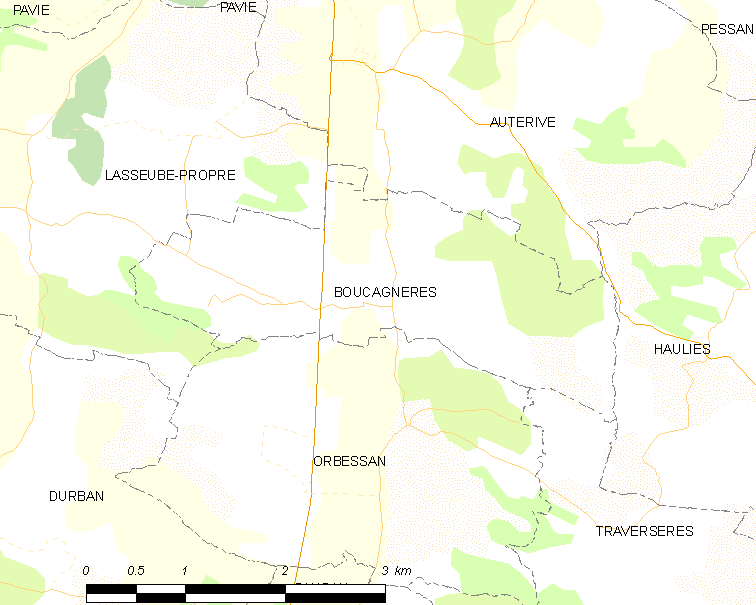
Boucagnères and its surrounding communes

== Population ==
Historical population
| Year | Pop. | ±% p.a. |
|---|---|---|
| 1968 | 107 | — |
| 1975 | 91 | −2.29% |
| 1982 | 125 | +4.64% |
| 1990 | 142 | +1.61% |
| 1999 | 141 | −0.08% |
| 2007 | 137 | −0.36% |
| 2012 | 140 | +0.43% |
| 2017 | 209 | +8.34% |
| 2023 | 207 | −0.16% |
Source: INSEE

== See also ==
- Communes of the Gers department
