= Durban, Gers =

Durban
- Commune
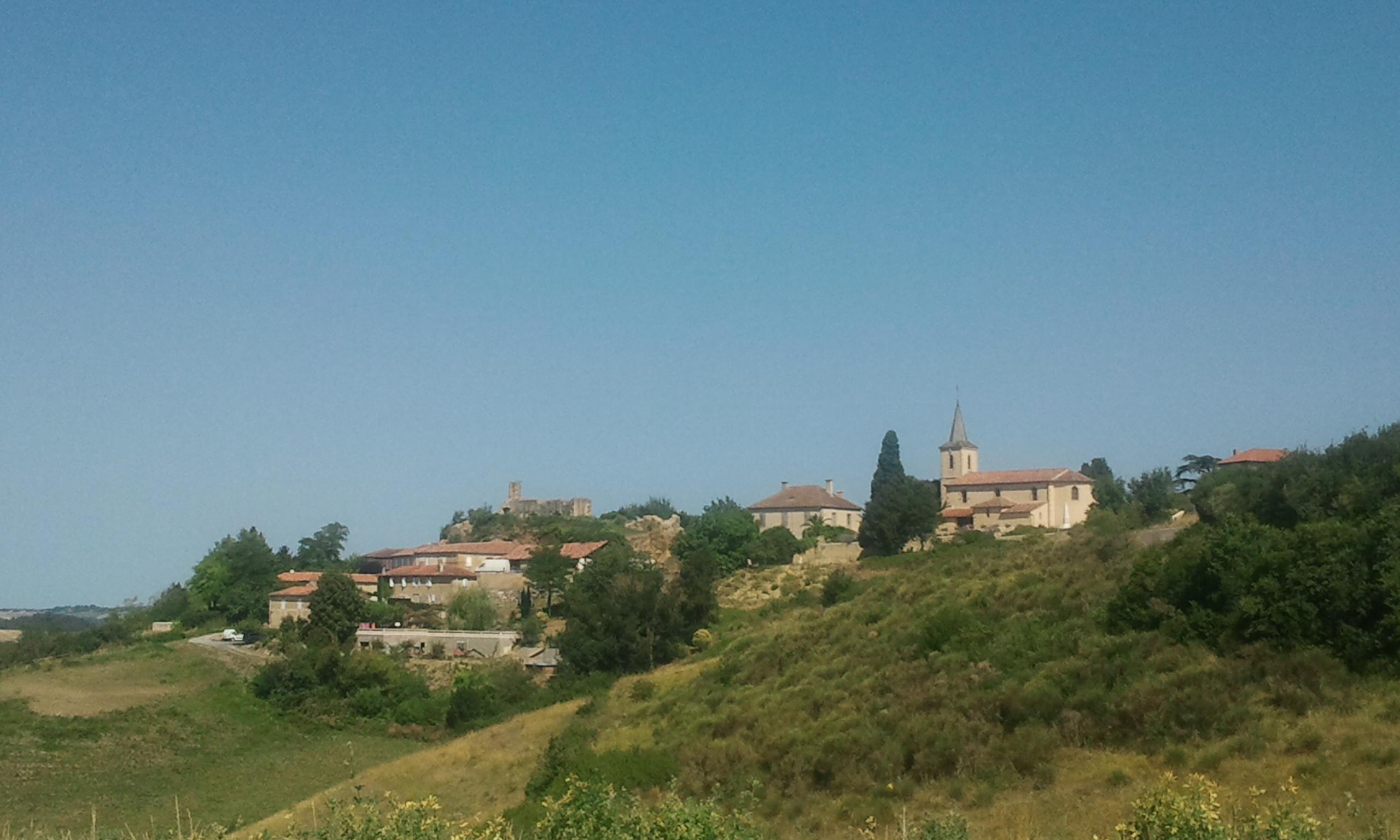
- A general view of Durban
- Location of Durban
- Location within France Location within Occitanie
- Coordinates: 43°32′23″N 0°34′44″E
- Country: France
- Region: Occitania
- Department: Gers
- Arrondissement: Mirande
- Canton: Auch-3
- Intercommunality: Val de Gers

Government
  - Mayor (2020–2026): Philippe Lalanne
- Area^{1}: 17.4 km^{2} (6.7 sq mi)
- Elevation: 270 m (890 ft)
- Highest elevation: 270 m (890 ft)
- Lowest elevation: 155 m (509 ft)
- Population (2023): 135
  - Density: 7.76/km^{2} (20.1/sq mi)
- Time zone: UTC+01:00 (CET)
  - Summer (DST): UTC+02:00 (CEST)
- INSEE/Postal code: 32118 /32260
- ^{1} French Land Register data, which excludes lakes, ponds, glaciers > 1 km^{2} (0.386 sq mi or 247 acres) and river estuaries.

Durban (French pronunciation: [dyʁbɑ̃]) (Durban in Gascon) is a commune in the Gers department in southwestern France in the Occitanie Region. Historically and culturally, the town is in the country of Astarac, a territory in the very hilly south of Gers, with clay soil, which runs along the Plateau de Lannemezan.

Exposed to an altered oceanic climate, it is drained by the Sousson, the Cédon and various other small rivers. The town has a notable natural heritage made up of three natural areas of ecological, faunal and floristic interest.

Durban is a rural commune with 138 inhabitants in 2019, after experiencing a population peak of 531 inhabitants in 1831. It is located near Auch. Its inhabitants are called Durbannais or Durbannaises.

== Buildings and monuments ==
The Moat and ruins of the chateau of the Counts of Astarac. The remains include a 14 m long room, in which are four open arches, two of which are in good condition, all located behind a curtain wall 2 m thick. The very short west curtain wall was dominated by a dungeon of which only the base remains. Centerpiece of the county possessions of Astarac, the fortress is mentioned in 1244, with Castelnau-Barbarens, Lasseube-Propre, Moncassin and Simorre, in the tribute paid by Count Centulle II and his mother Segnis de Lomagne to the Count of Toulouse for the entire county.

The Castle of Marteret. The manor house visible on the Cassini map is now only a quadrangular building partly ruined to the west. Private property, cannot be visited.

The Castle of Montagnan. The main habitat and the agricultural annexes are organized around a quadrangular central courtyard. The complex, which looks more like a farm than a real stately home, was in place in the middle of the 18th^{th} century because the Sieur de Luppé, marquis de Garrané, “holds the house of Montaignan, barnyard, barns, dovecote, garden, stables” in 1767. Private property, cannot be visited.

A Windmill at the eastern entrance to the village was associated with housing for the miller. It was rebuilt on the original location from 2017 to 2018. A bakehouse was also built.

== Geography ==
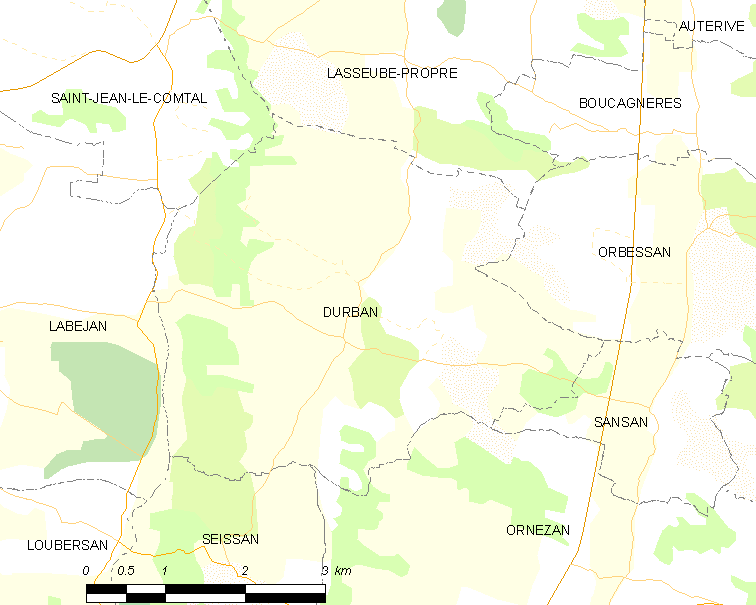
Durban and its surrounding communes

== Population ==
Historical population
Year	Pop.	±% p.a.
1968	174	—
1975	156	−1.55%
1982	167	+0.98%
1990	173	+0.44%
1999	162	−0.73%
2007	166	+0.31%
2012	148	−2.27%
2017	154	+0.80%
2023	135	−2.17%
Source: INSEE

== See also ==
- Communes of the Gers department
