= Ornézan =

- Commune
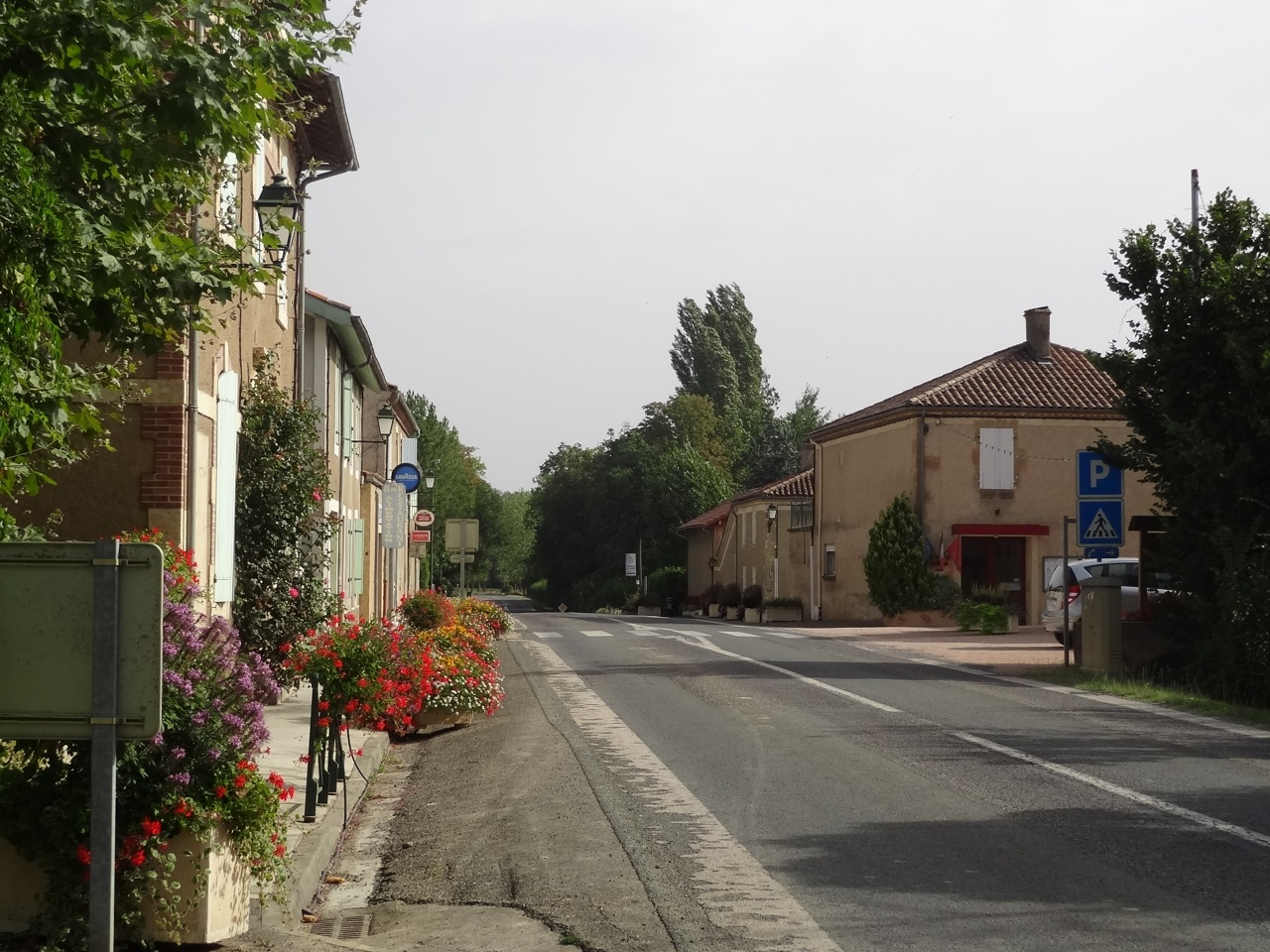
- The main street in Ornézan
- Location of Ornézan
- Location within France Location within Occitanie
- Coordinates: 43°30′42″N 0°36′10″E
- Country: France
- Region: Occitania
- Department: Gers
- Arrondissement: Mirande
- Canton: Auch-3
- Intercommunality: Val de Gers

Government
  - Mayor (2020–2026): Étienne Savary
- Area^{1}: 12.13 km^{2} (4.68 sq mi)
- Elevation: 180 m (590 ft)
- Highest elevation: 282 m (925 ft)
- Lowest elevation: 165 m (541 ft)
- Population (2023): 202
  - Density: 16.7/km^{2} (43.1/sq mi)
- Time zone: UTC+01:00 (CET)
  - Summer (DST): UTC+02:00 (CEST)
- INSEE/Postal code: 32302 /32260
- ^{1} French Land Register data, which excludes lakes, ponds, glaciers > 1 km^{2} (0.386 sq mi or 247 acres) and river estuaries.

Ornézan (French pronunciation: [ɔʁnezɑ̃]; Occitan: Ornesan) is a commune in the Gers department in southwestern France.

== Geography ==
=== Localisation ===
Ornézan is located 16 km south of Auch and 2 km north of Seissan, along the Gers river.

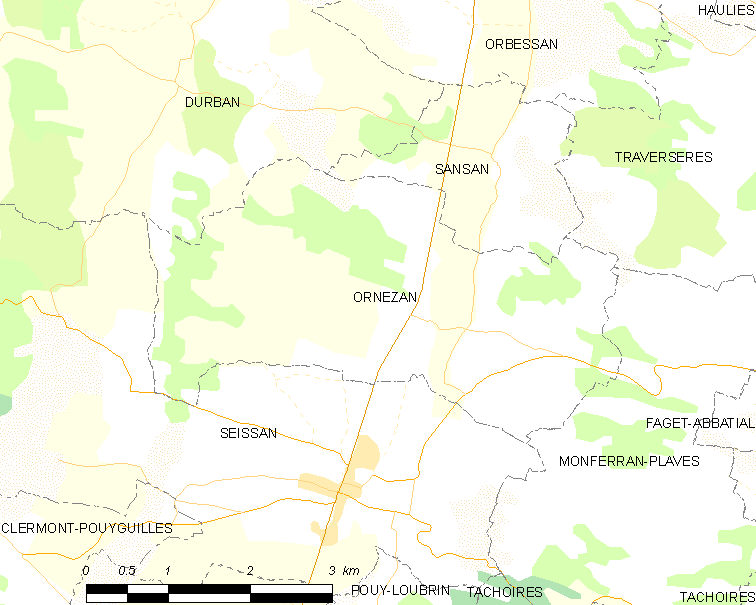
Ornézan and its surrounding communes

== Toponymy ==
Ornézan finds its origin in the Latin patronymic name Ornatius, followed by the suffix -anum, designing a property of which a man named Ornatius must have been the owner in the times of Roman Gaul. The village is later known in Latin as Ornezanus and Ornesan in Gascon, before becoming Ornézan in French.

== Government and politics ==
=== Mayors ===
Mayor	Term start	Term end
Julien Labadens	1945	1953
Julien Lacassagne	1953	1959
Germain Tico	1959	1968
Julien Lacassagne	1968	1983
Guy Defaut	1983	1989
Francis Meau	1989	2001
Étienne Savary	2001	

== Population ==
Historical population

Year	Pop.	±% p.a.
1793	299	—
1821	322	+0.27%
1846	350	+0.33%
1872	309	−0.48%
1901	256	−0.65%
1926	229	−0.44%
1946	215	−0.31%
1962	222	+0.20%
1968	209	−1.00%

Year	Pop.	±% p.a.
1975	209	+0.00%
1982	216	+0.47%
1990	225	+0.51%
1999	237	+0.58%
2007	250	+0.67%
2012	233	−1.40%
2017	229	−0.35%
2023	202	−2.07%

Source: EHESS and INSEE

== See also ==
- Communes of the Gers department
