= Auterive, Gers =

Auterive
- Commune
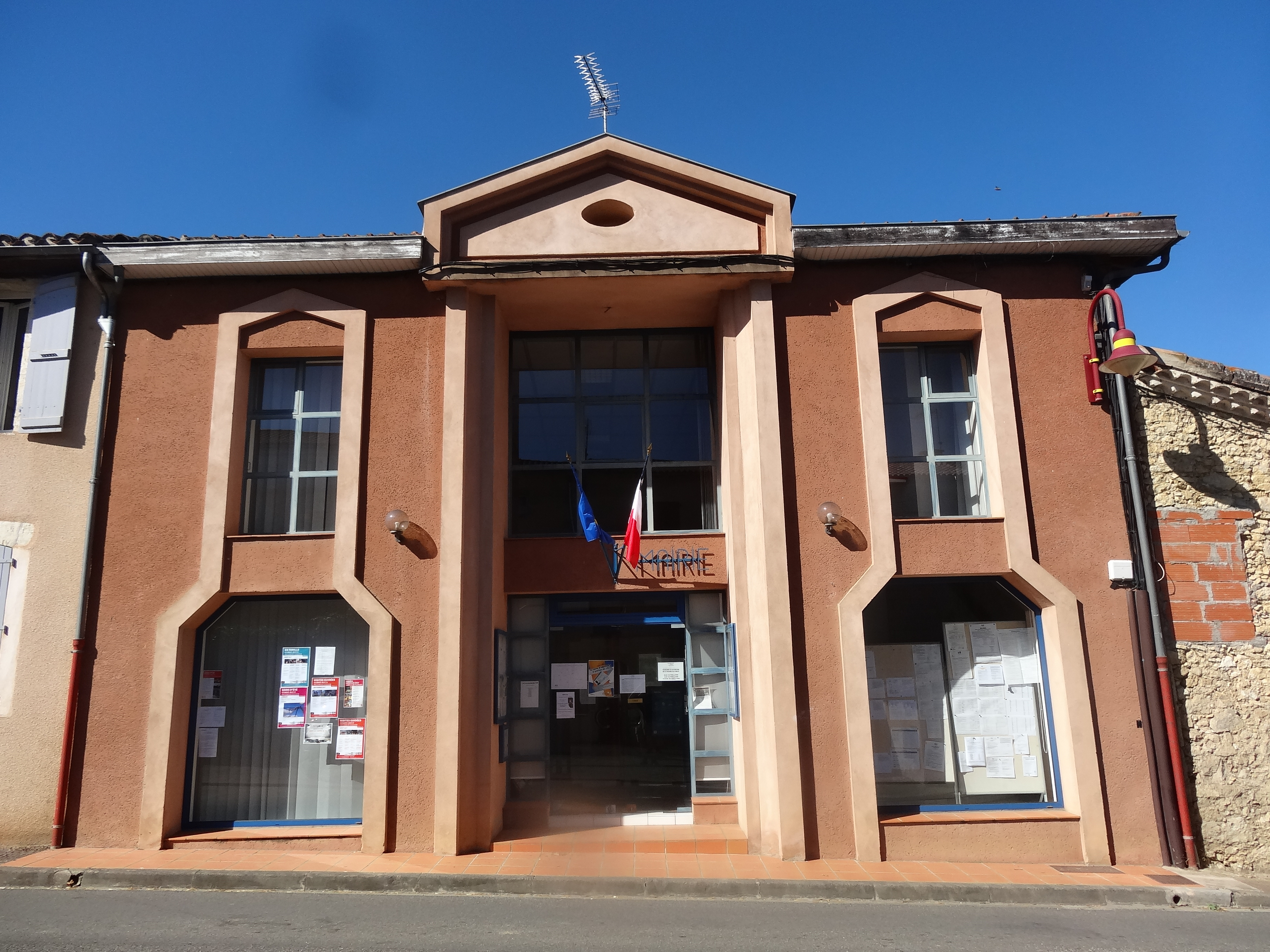
- The town hall in Auterive
- Location of Auterive
- Location within France Location within Occitanie
- Coordinates: 43°35′01″N 0°36′54″E
- Country: France
- Region: Occitania
- Department: Gers
- Arrondissement: Auch
- Canton: Auch-3
- Intercommunality: CA Grand Auch Cœur Gascogne

Government
  - Mayor (2020–2026): Bernard Pensivy
- Area^{1}: 10.79 km^{2} (4.17 sq mi)
- Elevation: 150 m (490 ft)
- Highest elevation: 285 m (935 ft)
- Lowest elevation: 141 m (463 ft)
- Population (2023): 529
  - Density: 49.0/km^{2} (127/sq mi)
- Time zone: UTC+01:00 (CET)
  - Summer (DST): UTC+02:00 (CEST)
- INSEE/Postal code: 32019 /32550
- ^{1} French Land Register data, which excludes lakes, ponds, glaciers > 1 km^{2} (0.386 sq mi or 247 acres) and river estuaries.

Auterive (French pronunciation: [otʁiv]; also Auterrive; Occitan: Autarriba) is a commune in the Gers department in southwestern France.

== Geography ==
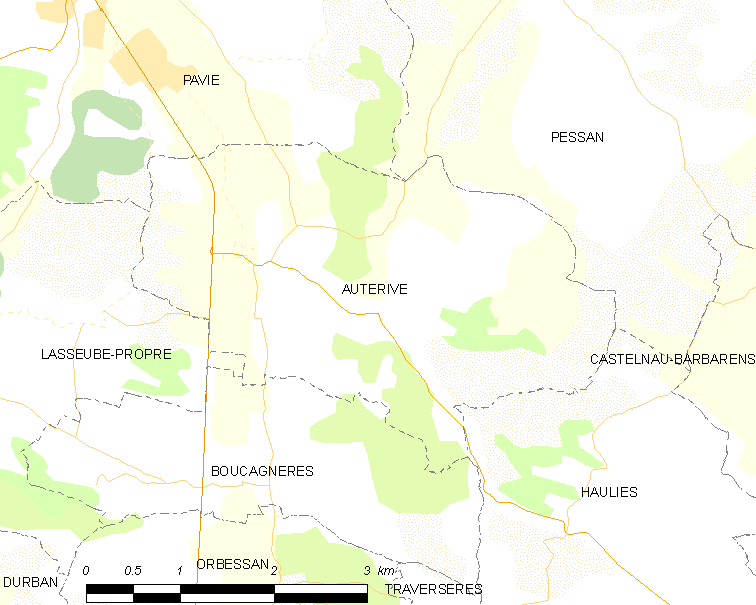
Auterive and its surrounding communes

== Population ==
Historical population
Year	Pop.	±% p.a.
1968	316	—
1975	416	+4.01%
1982	469	+1.73%
1990	490	+0.55%
1999	508	+0.40%
2007	529	+0.51%
2012	545	+0.60%
2017	520	−0.93%
2023	529	+0.29%
Source: INSEE

== See also ==
- Communes of the Gers department
