= Hôtel de Ville, Auch =

Town hall in Auch, France

Hôtel de Ville
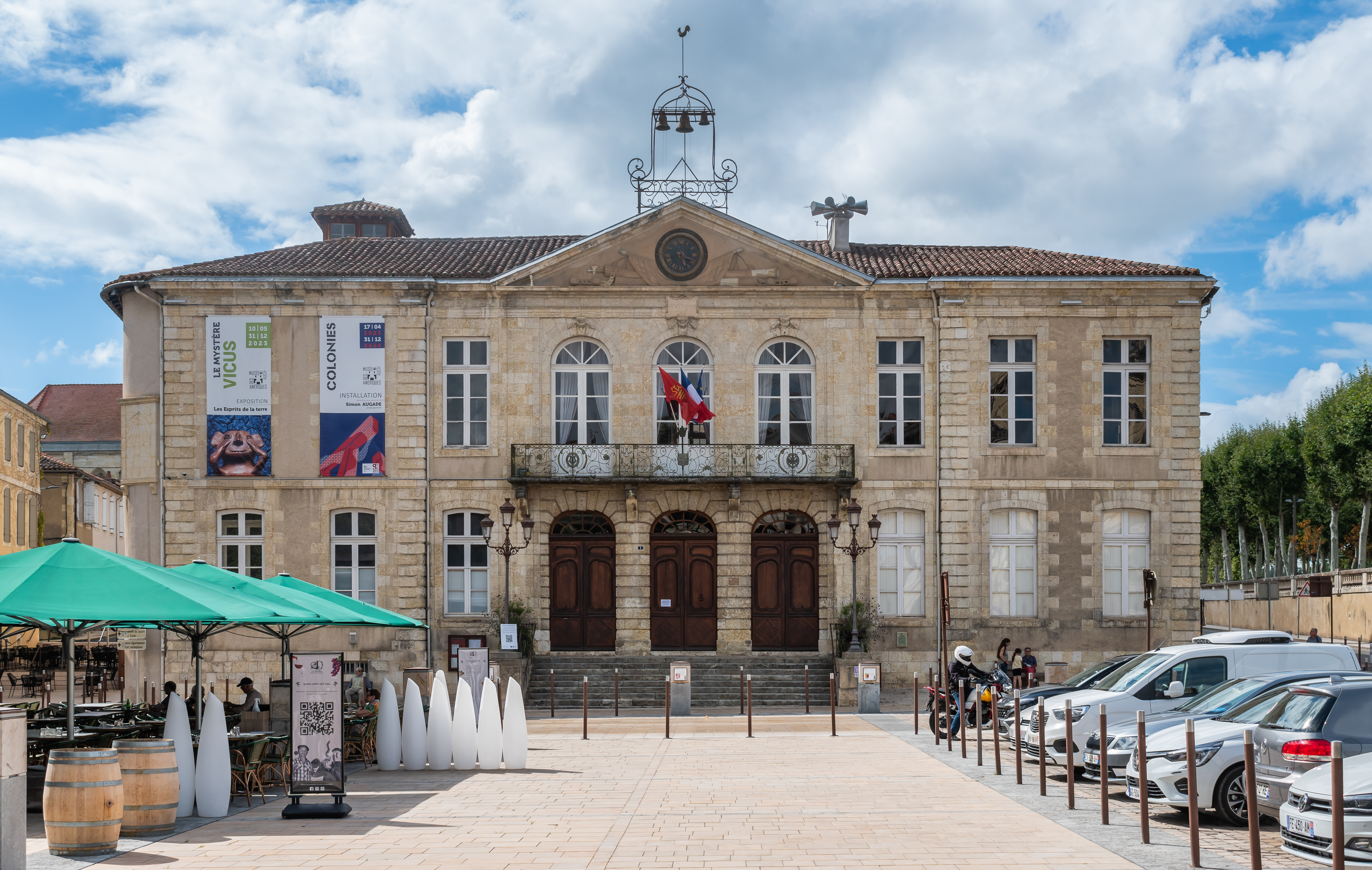
- The main frontage of the Hôtel de Ville in July 2023

General information
- Type: City hall
- Architectural style: Neoclassical style
- Location: Auch, France
- Coordinates: 43.6469°N 0.5831°E
- Completed: 1778

Design and construction
- Architects: François Picault and Albert du Limbeau

Monument historique
- Official name: Hôtel de ville
- Type: Inscrit
- Designated: 1947
- Reference no.: PA00094710

The Hôtel de Ville (French pronunciation: [otɛl də vil], City Hall) is a municipal building in Auch, Gers, in southwestern France, standing on Place de la Libération. It was designated a monument historique by the French government in 1947.

== History ==
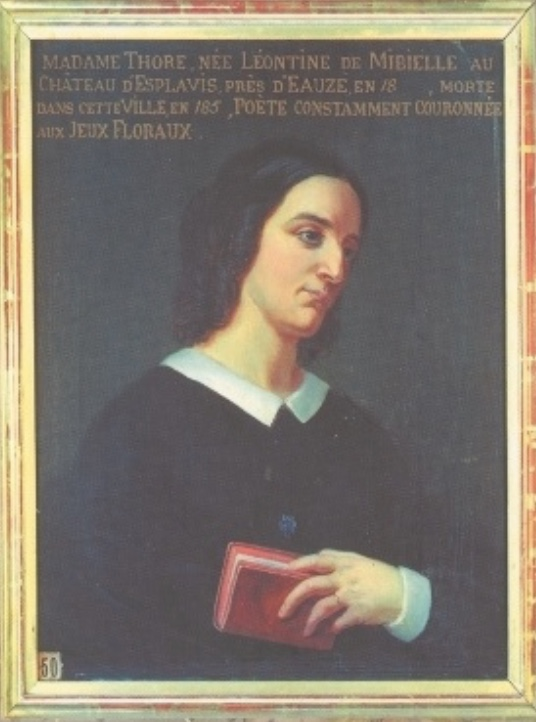
Portrait of Léontine de Mibielle

In the 13th century, the consuls met under an elm tree in the square in front of the Cathedral of Sainte-Marie. This practice continued until 1289, when they acquired a building on Place Betclar, close to the Halle aux Herbes, for use as their meeting place.

In 1759, after the old town hall became too cramped, the local intendant, Antoine Mégret d'Étigny, decided to commission a new building. The site he selected was on the west side of what is now Place de la Libération. Construction of the new building started in 1760. It was designed by François Picault, assisted by his son-in-law Albert du Limbeau, in the neoclassical style, built in ashlar stone and was completed in 1778.

The design involved a symmetrical main frontage of nine bays facing onto what is now Place de la Libération. The central section of three bays, which was slightly projected forward, featured a short flight of steps leading up to three round headed openings with voussoirs and keystones on the ground floor. There were three round-headed French doors on the first floor and an iron balcony in front. The central section was surmounted by an entablature and a pediment, with a clock in the tympanum and an iron bell tower on the roof. The other bays were fenestrated by segmental-headed windows on the ground floor and by square-headed windows on the first floor. Internally, the principal rooms included the Salle des Illustres (room of illustrious figures), which contained a series of fine paintings, the Salle des Mariages (wedding room) and the theatre.

Paintings in the La Salle des Illustres largely depicted clergymen or soldiers. However, they also included a portrait of the poet, Léontine de Mibielle, who was recognised for her work by the Consistori del Gay Saber in the mid-19th century. The Salle des Illustres also became the venue for council meetings. The theatre was designed in the Italian style with a fine ceiling painted by Jean Baudoin and was originally fitted out to seat up to 600 people. The frescos in the theatre represented poetry, eloquence, music, and painting, while the medallions on the upper gallery represented musical instruments and the medallions on the lower gallery depicted Molière, Jean Racine and William Shakespeare. After becoming dilapidated, and despite reluctance by the town council, the theatre was refurbished in 1851.

Following the liberation of the town by elements of the French Resistance on 19 August 1944, during the Second World War, a celebration took place when civilians and military personnel paraded in front of the town hall on 27 August 1944.
