= Canton of Auch-3 =

Administrative division of Gers department, France

Coordinates: 43.647°N 0.584°E

The canton of Auch-3 is an administrative division of the Gers department, southwestern France. It was created at the French canton reorganisation which came into effect in March 2015. Its seat is in Auch.

It consists of the following communes:

1. Auch (partly)
2. Auterive
3. Boucagnères
4. Durban
5. Haulies
6. Lasseube-Propre
7. Orbessan
8. Ornézan
9. Pessan
10. Sansan
