= Haulies =

- Commune
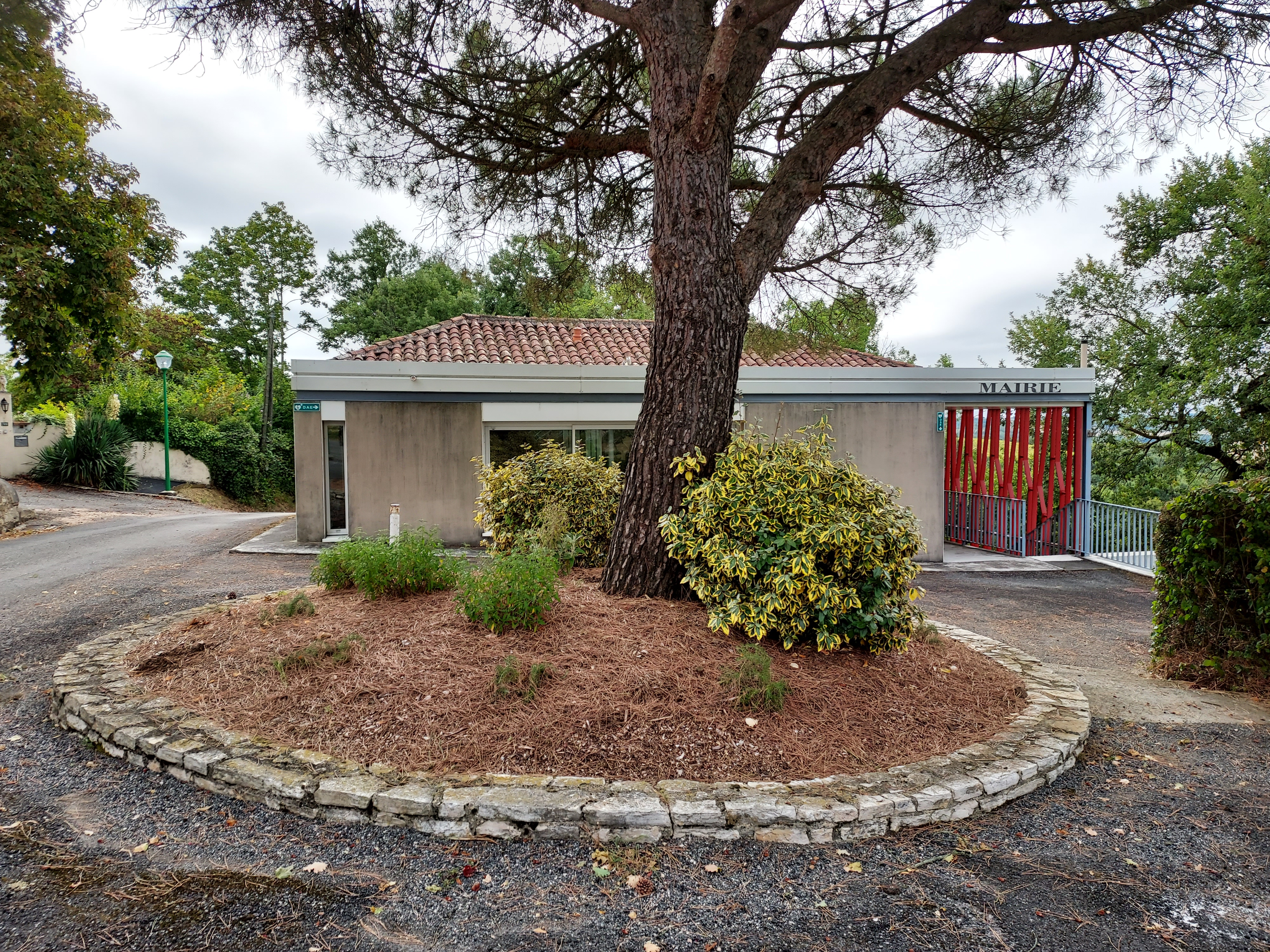
- Town hall
- Location of Haulies
- Location within France Location within Occitanie
- Coordinates: 43°33′30″N 0°40′03″E
- Country: France
- Region: Occitania
- Department: Gers
- Arrondissement: Mirande
- Canton: Auch-3
- Intercommunality: Val de Gers

Government
  - Mayor (2020–2026): David Pradel
- Area^{1}: 10.13 km^{2} (3.91 sq mi)
- Elevation: 325 m (1,066 ft)
- Highest elevation: 292 m (958 ft)
- Lowest elevation: 177 m (581 ft)
- Population (2023): 152
  - Density: 15.0/km^{2} (38.9/sq mi)
- Time zone: UTC+01:00 (CET)
  - Summer (DST): UTC+02:00 (CEST)
- INSEE/Postal code: 32153 /32550
- ^{1} French Land Register data, which excludes lakes, ponds, glaciers > 1 km^{2} (0.386 sq mi or 247 acres) and river estuaries.

Haulies (French pronunciation: [oli]; Occitan: Haulias) is a commune in the Gers department in southwestern France.

== Geography ==
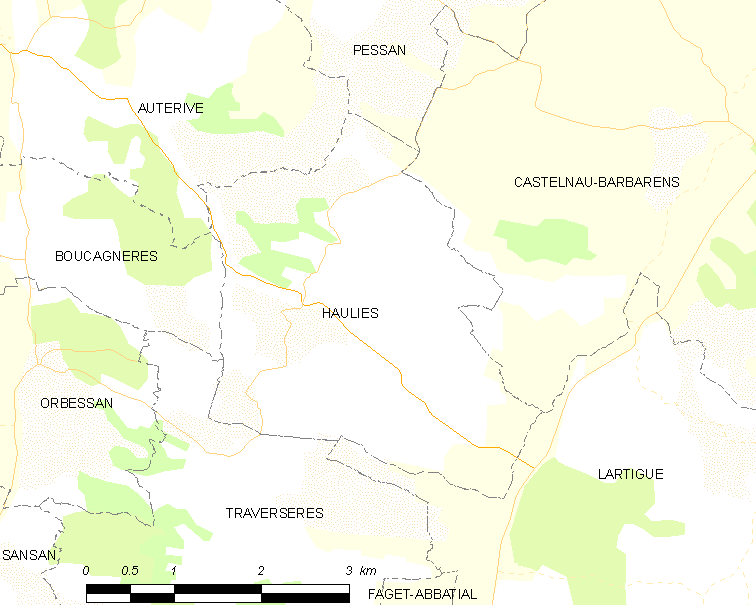
Haulies and its surrounding communes

== Population ==
Historical population
Year	Pop.	±% p.a.
1968	70	—
1975	52	−4.16%
1982	59	+1.82%
1990	76	+3.22%
1999	81	+0.71%
2007	104	+3.17%
2012	158	+8.72%
2017	165	+0.87%
2023	152	−1.36%
Source: INSEE

== See also ==
- Communes of the Gers department
