= Saint-Jean-le-Comtal =

Saint Jean le Comtal
- Commune
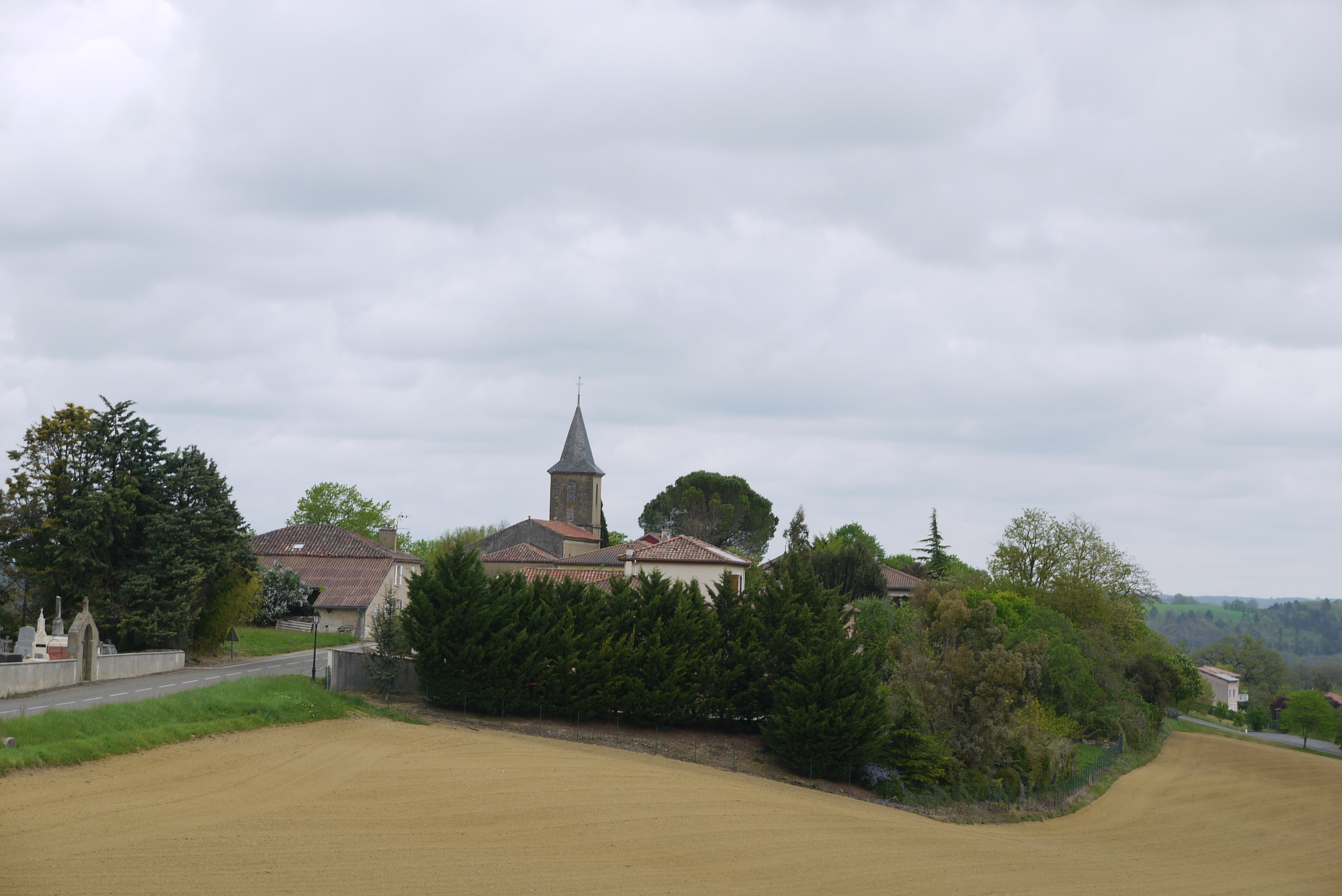
- Saint-Jean-le-Comtal seen from the West

- Coat of arms
- Location of Saint Jean le Comtal
- Location within France Location within Occitanie
- Coordinates: 43°34′42″N 0°31′14″E
- Country: France
- Region: Occitania
- Department: Gers
- Arrondissement: Mirande
- Canton: Auch-1
- Intercommunality: Val de Gers

Government
  - Mayor (2020–2026): Éric Bonnet
- Area^{1}: 17.15 km^{2} (6.62 sq mi)
- Elevation: 154 m (505 ft)
- Highest elevation: 271 m (889 ft)
- Lowest elevation: 145 m (476 ft)
- Population (2023): 381
  - Density: 22.2/km^{2} (57.5/sq mi)
- Time zone: UTC+01:00 (CET)
  - Summer (DST): UTC+02:00 (CEST)
- INSEE/Postal code: 32381 /32550
- ^{1} French Land Register data, which excludes lakes, ponds, glaciers > 1 km^{2} (0.386 sq mi or 247 acres) and river estuaries.

Saint-Jean-le-Comtal (French pronunciation: [sɛ̃ ʒɑ̃ lə kɔ̃tal]; Occitan: Sent Joan lo Comdau) is a commune in the Gers department in southwestern France.

== Geography ==
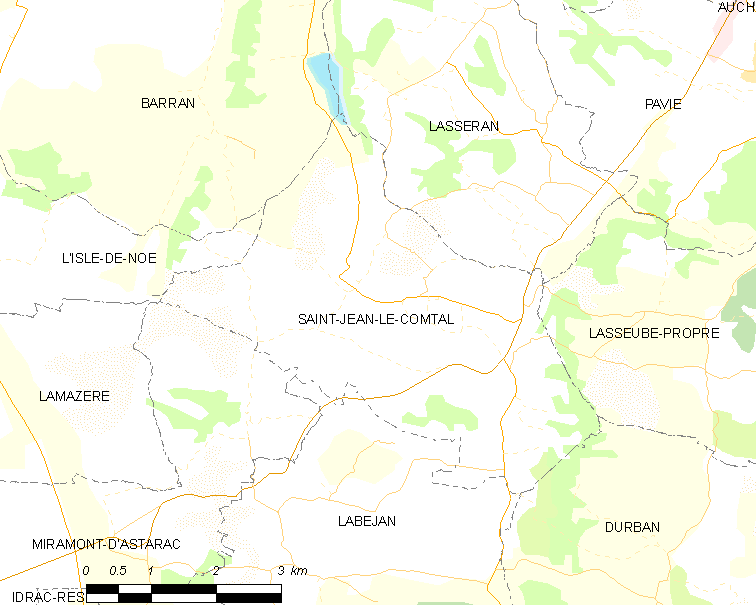
Saint-Jean-le-Comtal and its surrounding communes

== Population ==
Historical population
Year	Pop.	±% p.a.
1968	331	—
1975	286	−2.07%
1982	333	+2.20%
1990	318	−0.57%
1999	348	+1.01%
2007	381	+1.14%
2012	397	+0.83%
2017	411	+0.70%
2023	381	−1.26%
Source: INSEE

== See also ==
- Communes of the Gers department
