= Barran =

- Commune
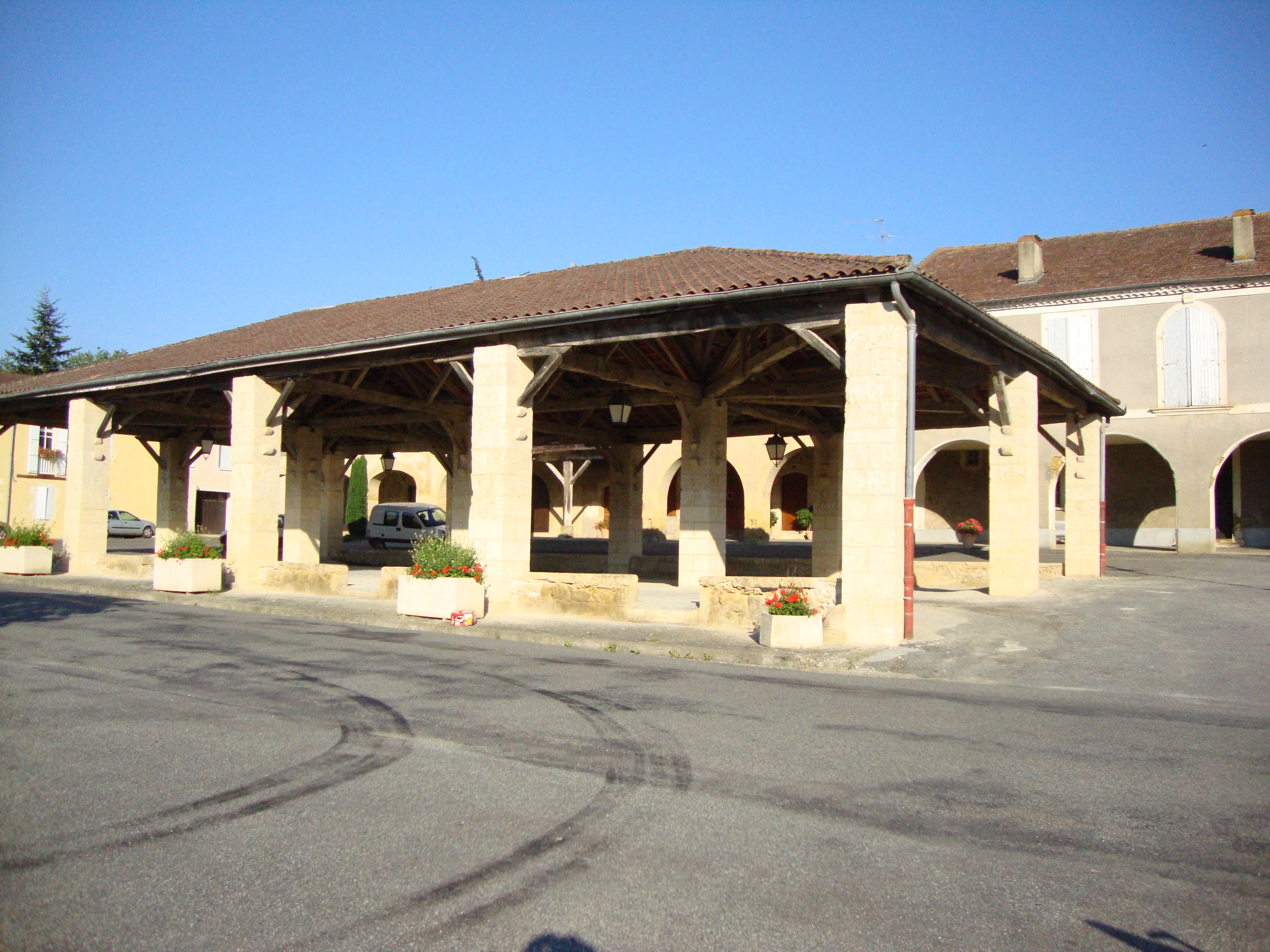
- Market hall

- Coat of arms
- Location of Barran
- Location within France Location within Occitanie
- Coordinates: 43°37′03″N 0°26′37″E
- Country: France
- Region: Occitania
- Department: Gers
- Arrondissement: Mirande
- Canton: Auch-1
- Intercommunality: Val de Gers

Government
  - Mayor (2020–2026): Nicole Joullié
- Area^{1}: 52.82 km^{2} (20.39 sq mi)
- Elevation: 182 m (597 ft)
- Highest elevation: 283 m (928 ft)
- Lowest elevation: 121 m (397 ft)
- Population (2023): 692
  - Density: 13.1/km^{2} (33.9/sq mi)
- Time zone: UTC+01:00 (CET)
  - Summer (DST): UTC+02:00 (CEST)
- INSEE/Postal code: 32029 /32350
- ^{1} French Land Register data, which excludes lakes, ponds, glaciers > 1 km^{2} (0.386 sq mi or 247 acres) and river estuaries.

Barran (French pronunciation: [baʁɑ̃]) is a commune in the Gers department in southwestern France.

== Geography ==
Barran is located on the river Baïse 15 km (9.3 mi) from the capital of the Gers department, Auch.

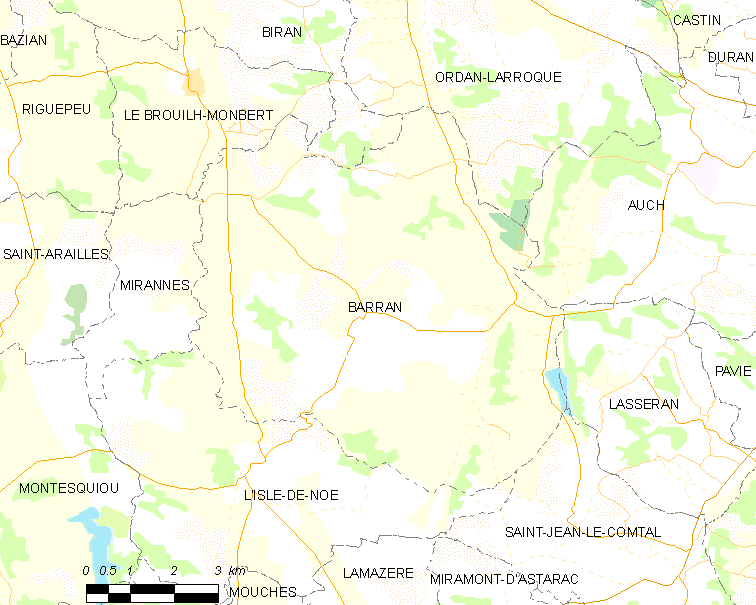
Barran and its surrounding communes

== History ==
Barran is a typical example of a bastide, those villages that were erected in Gascony in the late Middle Ages. It was founded by the end of the 13th century. It is well known in the region for the very unusual helical shape of the tower of its church. Not in the village itself but still on the territory of the commune (the third largest of the department in surface area) are several interesting places, like the castle of Mazères, which was the summer residency of the bishops of Auch and then a military hospital during World War I. Close to the castle is the bridge of Mazères, which was built around the 16th century over the river Baïse. In the 19th century Barran was famous for its snails, from which special gums were made to prevent people from coughing.

== Population ==
Historical population
Year	Pop.	±% p.a.
1968	801	—
1975	660	−2.73%
1982	653	−0.15%
1990	618	−0.69%
1999	671	+0.92%
2007	718	+0.85%
2012	685	−0.94%
2017	673	−0.35%
2023	692	+0.47%
Source: INSEE

Before the migration movement from the countryside to the cities, Barran was quite populous, as was Gers, with up to 2,000 people on the eve of the First World War. Then the population began to fall dramatically, but the trend has changed since the beginning of the '90s: nowadays around 700 people live in the commune, making it the 24th out of 476 communes by population. All basic private and public services (e.g., doctor, grocery and bakery, school, post office, sport facilities) are to be found in the village.

The proximity of Auch, the capital of the department, and Toulouse, the regional capital, which is only 100 km (62 mi) to the east, as well as the current migration trend toward Southern Europe, should boost the further development of Barran.

== See also ==
- Communes of the Gers department
