= Le Brouilh-Monbert =

- Commune
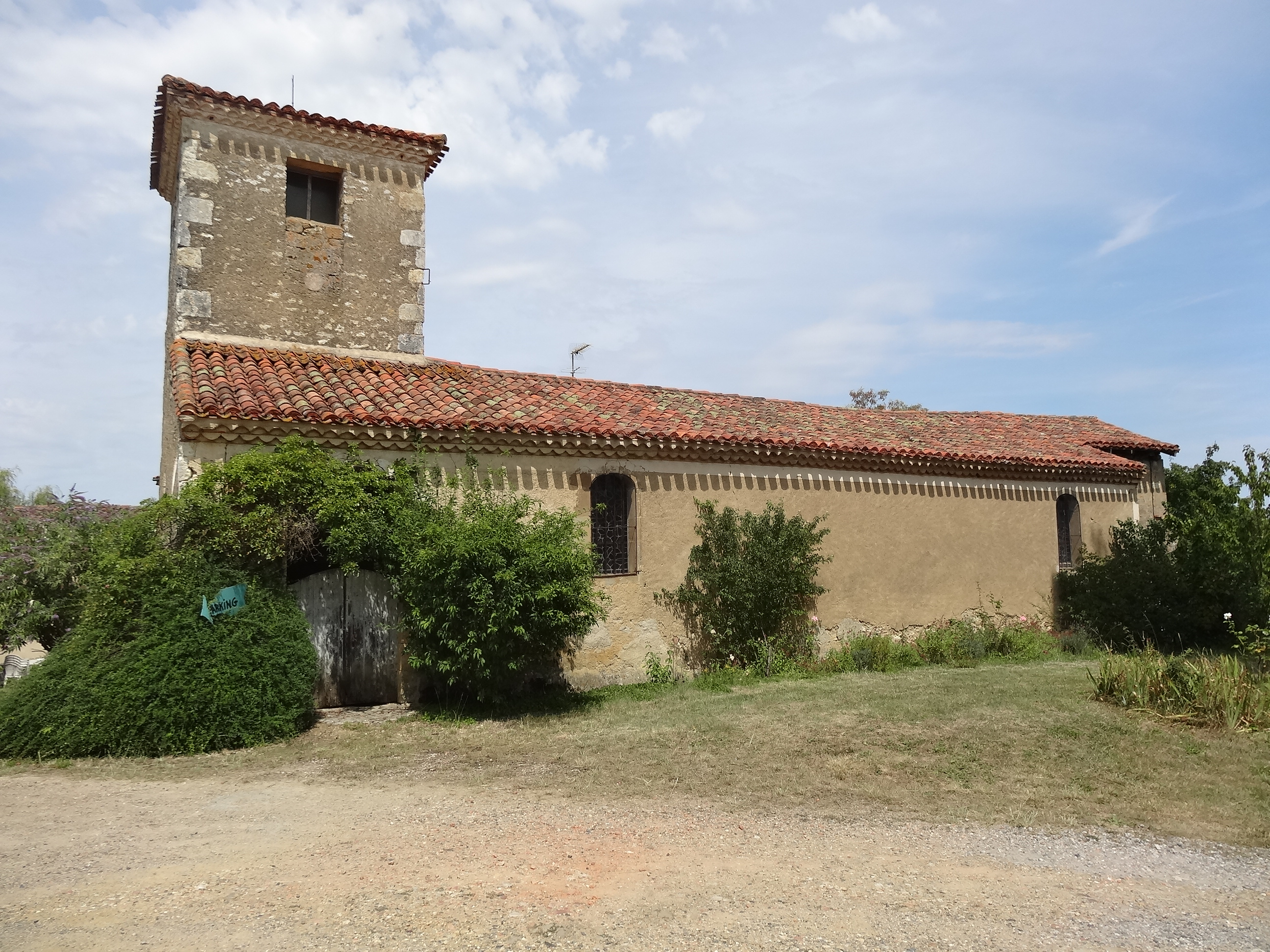
- The church in Monbert
- Location of Le Brouilh-Monbert
- Location within France Location within Occitanie
- Coordinates: 43°40′05″N 0°23′41″E
- Country: France
- Region: Occitania
- Department: Gers
- Arrondissement: Mirande
- Canton: Auch-1
- Intercommunality: Val de Gers

Government
  - Mayor (2020–2026): André Baldini
- Area^{1}: 12.96 km^{2} (5.00 sq mi)
- Elevation: 123 m (404 ft)
- Highest elevation: 246 m (807 ft)
- Lowest elevation: 115 m (377 ft)
- Population (2023): 235
  - Density: 18.1/km^{2} (47.0/sq mi)
- Time zone: UTC+01:00 (CET)
  - Summer (DST): UTC+02:00 (CEST)
- INSEE/Postal code: 32065 /32350
- ^{1} French Land Register data, which excludes lakes, ponds, glaciers > 1 km^{2} (0.386 sq mi or 247 acres) and river estuaries.

Le Brouilh-Monbert (French pronunciation: [lə bʁuj mɔ̃bɛʁ]; Occitan: Lo Brolh e Montverd) is a commune in the Gers department in southwestern France. It was created in 1974 by the merger of two former communes: Le Brouilh and Monbert.

== Geography ==
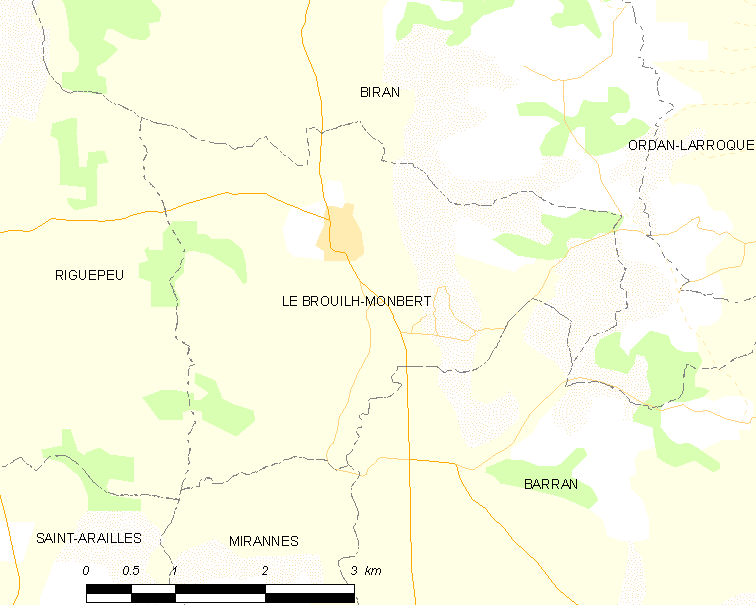
Le Brouilh-Monbert and its surrounding communes

== Population ==
Historical population
Year	Pop.	±% p.a.
1968	266	—
1975	228	−2.18%
1982	202	−1.71%
1990	207	+0.31%
1999	212	+0.27%
2007	255	+2.34%
2012	218	−3.09%
2017	228	+0.90%
2023	235	+0.51%
Source: INSEE

== See also ==
- Communes of the Gers department
