= Lasséran =

- Commune
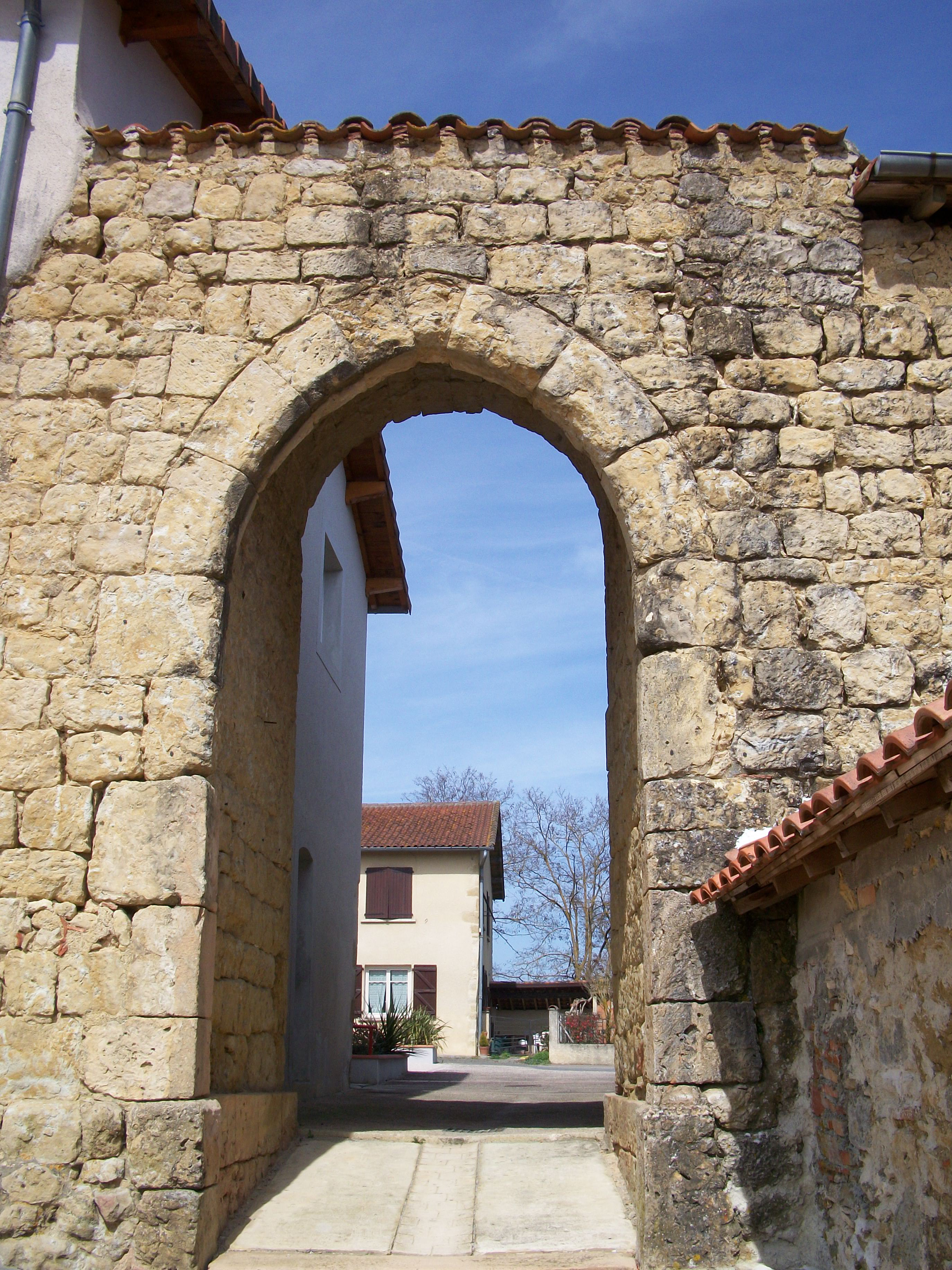
- City gate
- Location of Lasséran
- Location within France Location within Occitanie
- Coordinates: 43°35′34″N 0°32′17″E
- Country: France
- Region: Occitania
- Department: Gers
- Arrondissement: Mirande
- Canton: Auch-1
- Intercommunality: Val de Gers

Government
  - Mayor (2024–2026): Arthur Benoit
- Area^{1}: 15.06 km^{2} (5.81 sq mi)
- Elevation: 149 m (489 ft)
- Highest elevation: 262 m (860 ft)
- Lowest elevation: 144 m (472 ft)
- Population (2023): 358
  - Density: 23.8/km^{2} (61.6/sq mi)
- Time zone: UTC+01:00 (CET)
  - Summer (DST): UTC+02:00 (CEST)
- INSEE/Postal code: 32200 /32550
- ^{1} French Land Register data, which excludes lakes, ponds, glaciers > 1 km^{2} (0.386 sq mi or 247 acres) and river estuaries.

Lasséran (French pronunciation: [laseʁɑ̃]; Occitan: Lasseran) is a commune in the Gers department in southwestern France.

== Geography ==
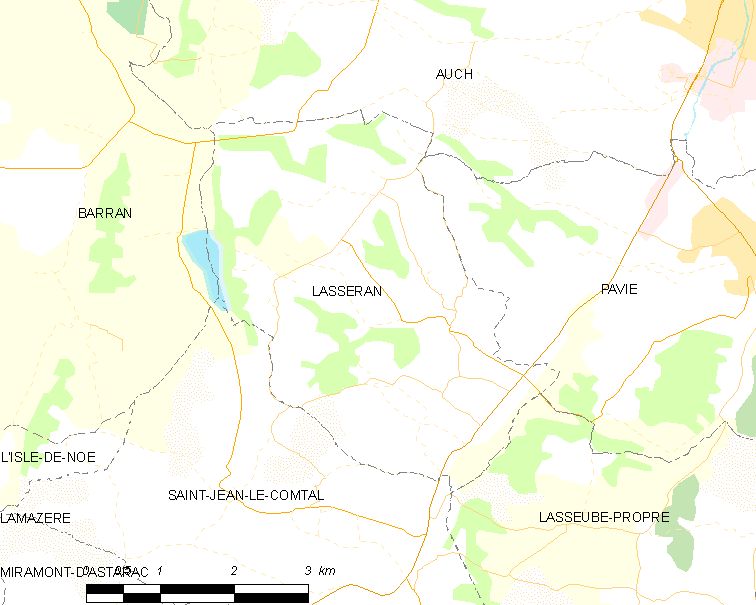
Lasséran and its surrounding communes

== Population ==
Historical population
Year	Pop.	±% p.a.
1968	156	—
1975	164	+0.72%
1982	154	−0.89%
1990	191	+2.73%
1999	256	+3.31%
2007	318	+2.75%
2012	371	+3.13%
2017	385	+0.74%
2023	358	−1.20%
Source: INSEE

== See also ==
- Communes of the Gers department
