= Pessan =

- Commune
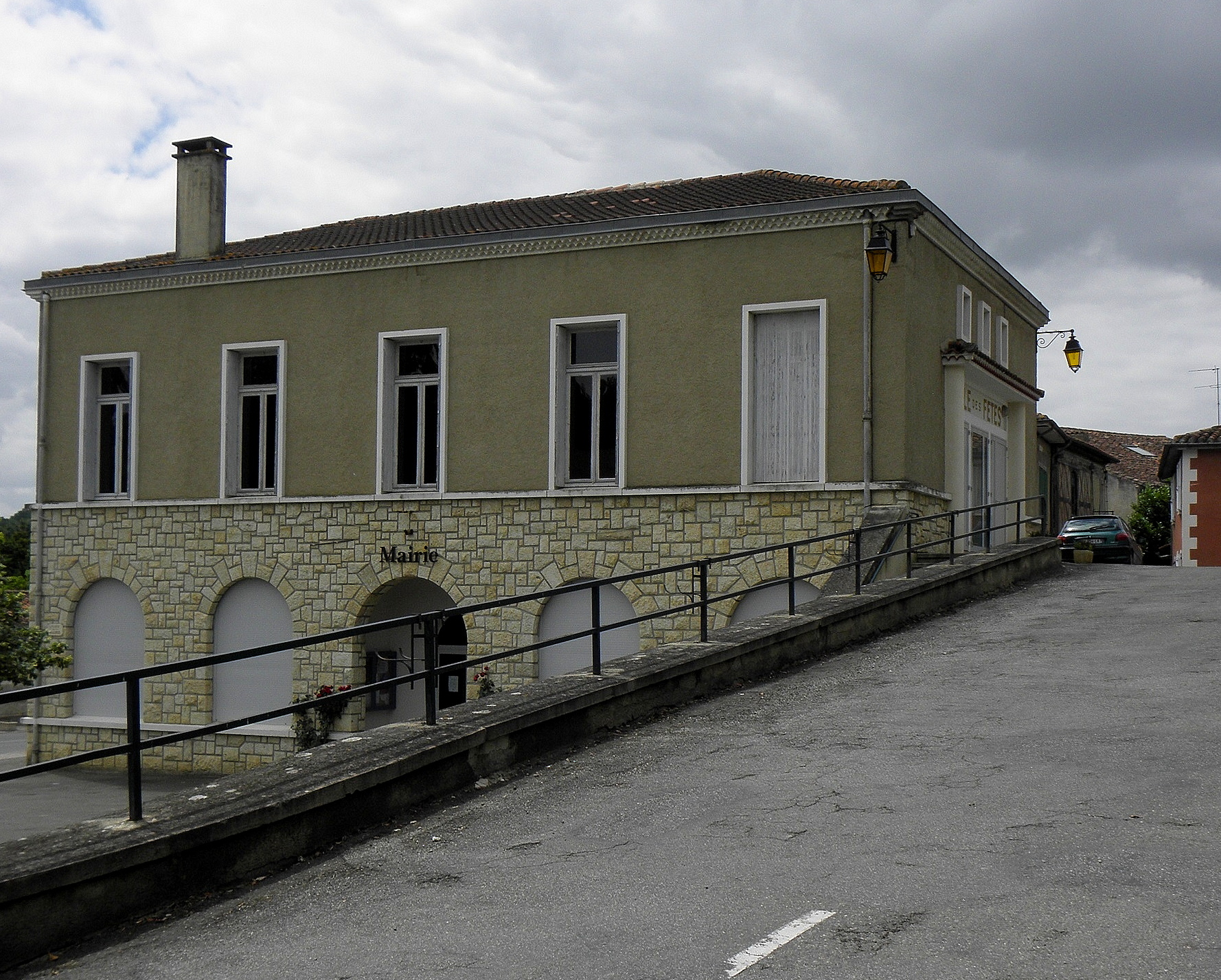
- The town hall in Pessan
- Location of Pessan
- Location within France Location within Occitanie
- Coordinates: 43°37′16″N 0°38′57″E
- Country: France
- Region: Occitania
- Department: Gers
- Arrondissement: Auch
- Canton: Auch-3
- Intercommunality: CA Grand Auch Cœur Gascogne

Government
  - Mayor (2020–2026): Jacques Sérès
- Area^{1}: 26.87 km^{2} (10.37 sq mi)
- Elevation: 140 m (460 ft)
- Highest elevation: 292 m (958 ft)
- Lowest elevation: 153 m (502 ft)
- Population (2023): 648
  - Density: 24.1/km^{2} (62.5/sq mi)
- Time zone: UTC+01:00 (CET)
  - Summer (DST): UTC+02:00 (CEST)
- INSEE/Postal code: 32312 /32550
- ^{1} French Land Register data, which excludes lakes, ponds, glaciers > 1 km^{2} (0.386 sq mi or 247 acres) and river estuaries.

Pessan (French pronunciation: [pesɑ̃]) is a commune in the Gers department in southwestern France.

== Geography ==
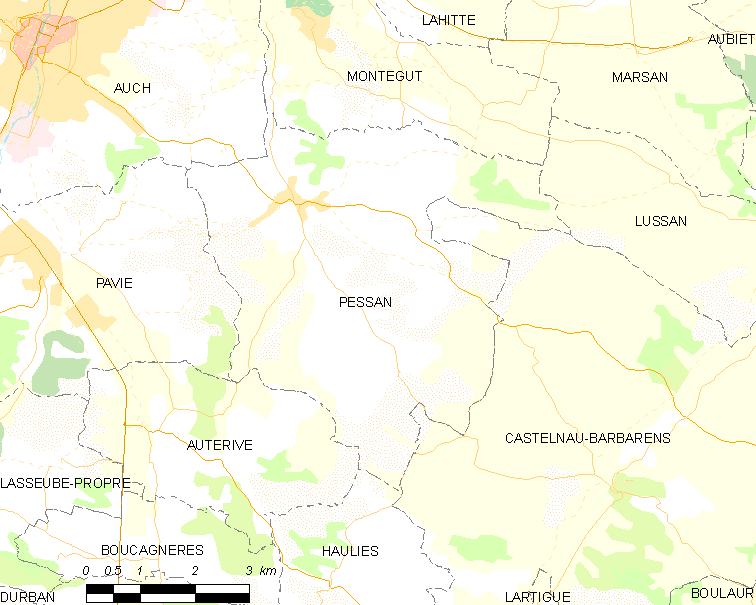
Pessan and its surrounding communes

== Population ==
Historical population
| Year | Pop. | ±% p.a. |
|---|---|---|
| 1968 | 422 | — |
| 1975 | 524 | +3.14% |
| 1982 | 604 | +2.05% |
| 1990 | 660 | +1.11% |
| 1999 | 634 | −0.45% |
| 2007 | 683 | +0.93% |
| 2012 | 692 | +0.26% |
| 2017 | 671 | −0.61% |
| 2023 | 648 | −0.58% |
Source: INSEE

== See also ==
- Communes of the Gers department
