= Lasseube-Propre =

- Commune
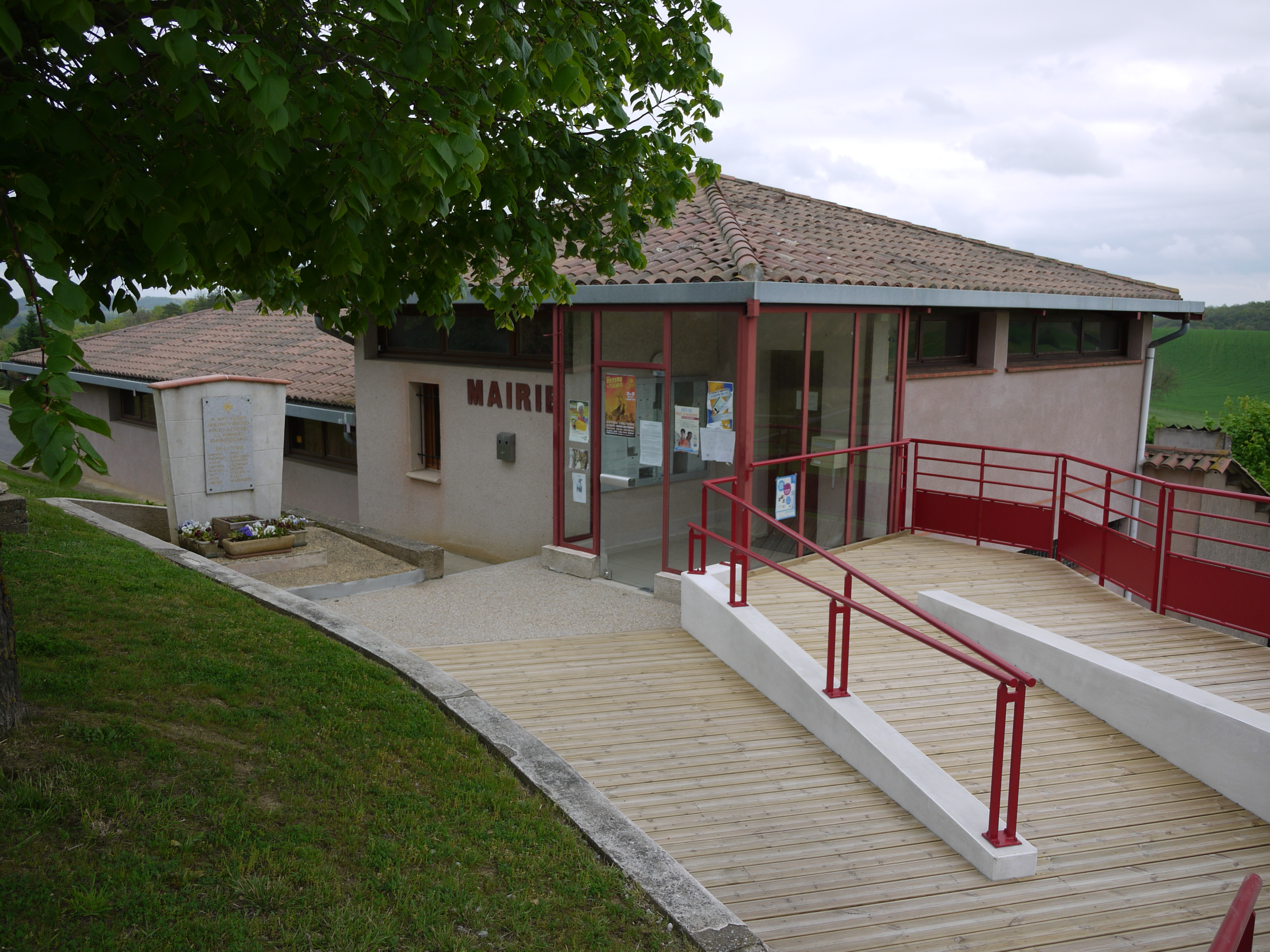
- The town hall in Lasseube-Propre

- Coat of arms
- Location of Lasseube-Propre
- Location within France Location within Occitanie
- Coordinates: 43°34′32″N 0°34′26″E
- Country: France
- Region: Occitania
- Department: Gers
- Arrondissement: Mirande
- Canton: Auch-3
- Intercommunality: Val de Gers

Government
  - Mayor (2020–2026): André Sempastous
- Area^{1}: 14.57 km^{2} (5.63 sq mi)
- Elevation: 230 m (750 ft)
- Highest elevation: 251 m (823 ft)
- Lowest elevation: 145 m (476 ft)
- Population (2023): 337
  - Density: 23.1/km^{2} (59.9/sq mi)
- Time zone: UTC+01:00 (CET)
  - Summer (DST): UTC+02:00 (CEST)
- INSEE/Postal code: 32201 /32550
- ^{1} French Land Register data, which excludes lakes, ponds, glaciers > 1 km^{2} (0.386 sq mi or 247 acres) and river estuaries.

Lasseube-Propre (French pronunciation: [lasœb pʁɔpʁ]; Occitan: La Seuva Pròpra) is a commune in the Gers department in southwestern France.

== Geography ==
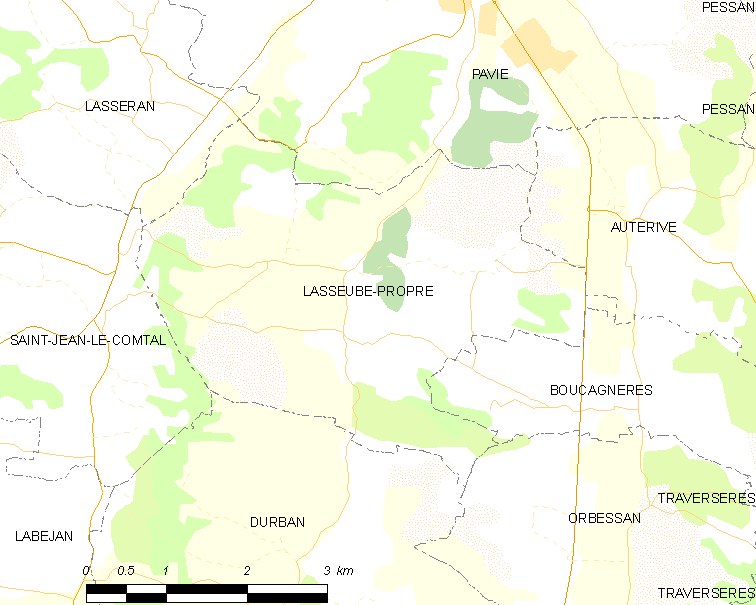
Lasseube-Propre and its surrounding communes

== Population ==
Historical population
Year	Pop.	±% p.a.
1968	143	—
1975	138	−0.51%
1982	163	+2.41%
1990	210	+3.22%
1999	237	+1.35%
2007	329	+4.19%
2012	338	+0.54%
2017	340	+0.12%
2023	337	−0.15%
Source: INSEE

== See also ==
- Communes of the Gers department
