= Gers (river) =

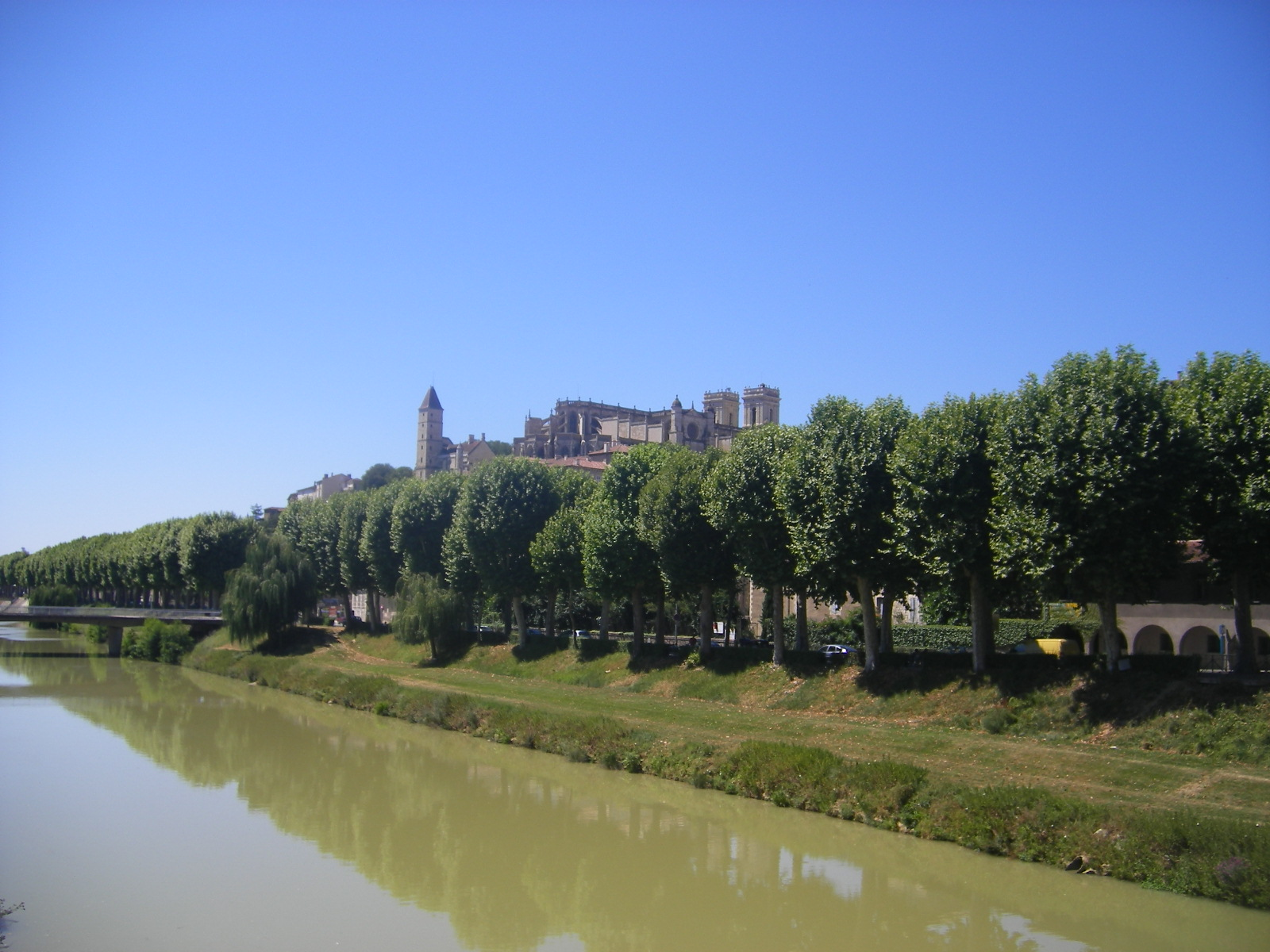
- Gers River in Auch

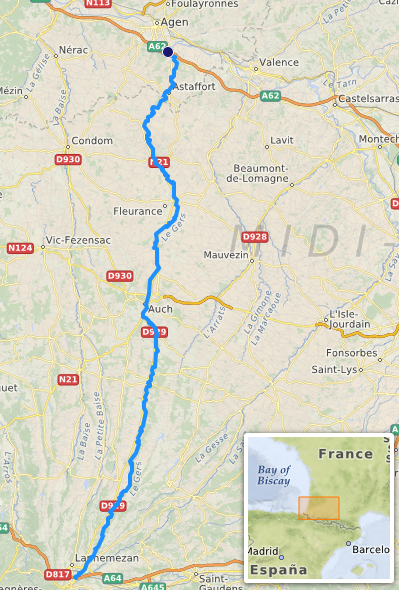

Location
- Country: France

Physical characteristics
- Source
  - location: Plateau de Lannemezan
- Mouth
  - location: Garonne
  - coordinates: 44°8′40″N 0°38′52″E
- Length: 175.4 km (109.0 mi)
- Basin size: 1,227 km^{2} (474 mi^{2})
- Discharge
  - average: 7.06 m^{3}/s (249 cu ft/s)

Basin features
- Progression: Garonne→ Gironde estuary→ Atlantic Ocean Gers→ Garonne→ Gironde estuary→ Atlantic Ocean

The Gers (French: [ʒɛʁ(s)]) is a 175-kilometre (109 mi) long river in southern France, left tributary of the Garonne.

Its source is in the foothills of the Pyrenees, near Lannemezan. It flows north through the départements Hautes-Pyrénées, Gers and Lot-et-Garonne. It flows into the Garonne in Layrac, near Agen. The city Auch lies along the river Gers. It gives its name to the Gers département.

== Toponymy ==
The name of the Gers appears in the sixth century as Ægirtius, de Egircio flumine and Gircius. It is known as in flumine Gersio in 817 and as Iercius in the 13th century.

== Departments and cities ==
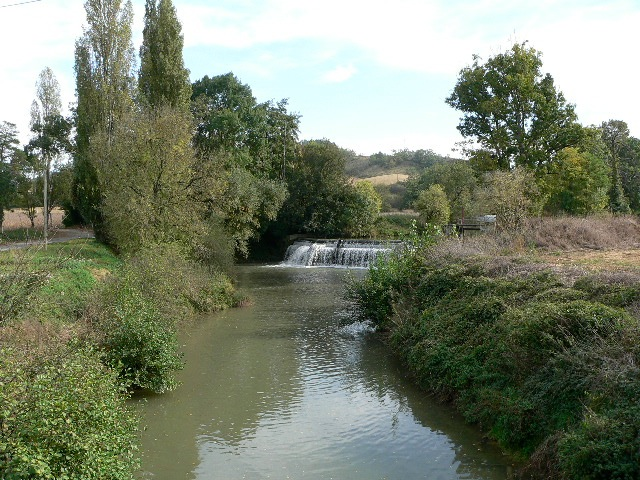
The Gers river in Ornézan

The Gers passes through the following departments and main towns:

- Hautes-Pyrénées : Lannemezan, Monléon-Magnoac
- Gers : Chélan, Panassac, Masseube, Seissan, Pavie, Auch, Preignan, Montestruc-sur-Gers, Fleurance, Lectoure
- Lot-et-Garonne : Astaffort, Layrac
