= Auch =

Auch Aush (Occitan)
- Prefecture and commune
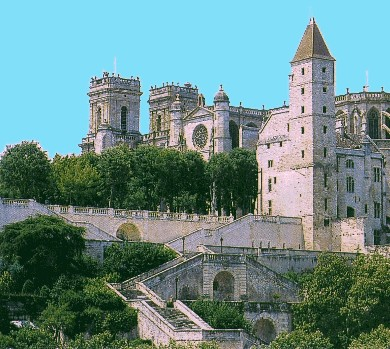
- Cathedral

- Coat of arms
- Location of Auch
- Location within France Location within Occitanie
- Coordinates: 43°38′47″N 0°35′08″E
- Country: France
- Region: Occitania
- Department: Gers
- Arrondissement: Auch
- Canton: Auch-1, Auch-2, Auch-3
- Intercommunality: CA Grand Auch Cœur Gascogne

Government
  - Mayor (2026–32): Camille Bonne
- Area^{1}: 72.48 km^{2} (27.98 sq mi)
- Elevation: 166 m (545 ft)
- Highest elevation: 281 m (922 ft)
- Lowest elevation: 115 m (377 ft)
- Population (2023): 22,428
  - Density: 309.4/km^{2} (801.4/sq mi)
- Time zone: UTC+01:00 (CET)
  - Summer (DST): UTC+02:00 (CEST)
- INSEE/Postal code: 32013 /32000
- ^{1} French Land Register data, which excludes lakes, ponds, glaciers > 1 km^{2} (0.386 sq mi or 247 acres) and river estuaries.

Auch (French pronunciation: [ᴐʃ]; Gascon: Aush [ˈawʃ]) is a commune in southwestern France. Located in Occitania, it is the capital of the Gers department.

== Geography ==
=== Localization ===
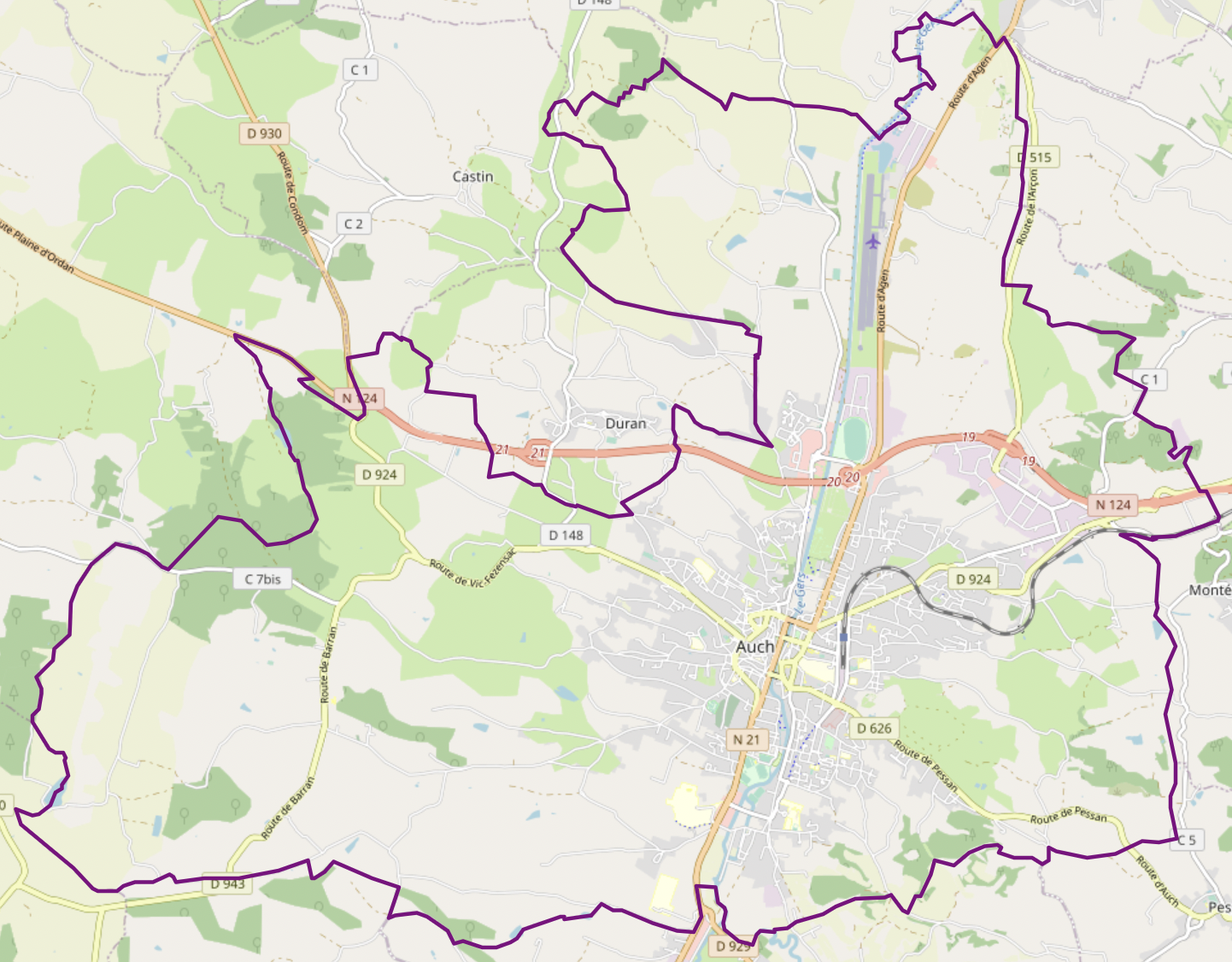
OpenStreetMap

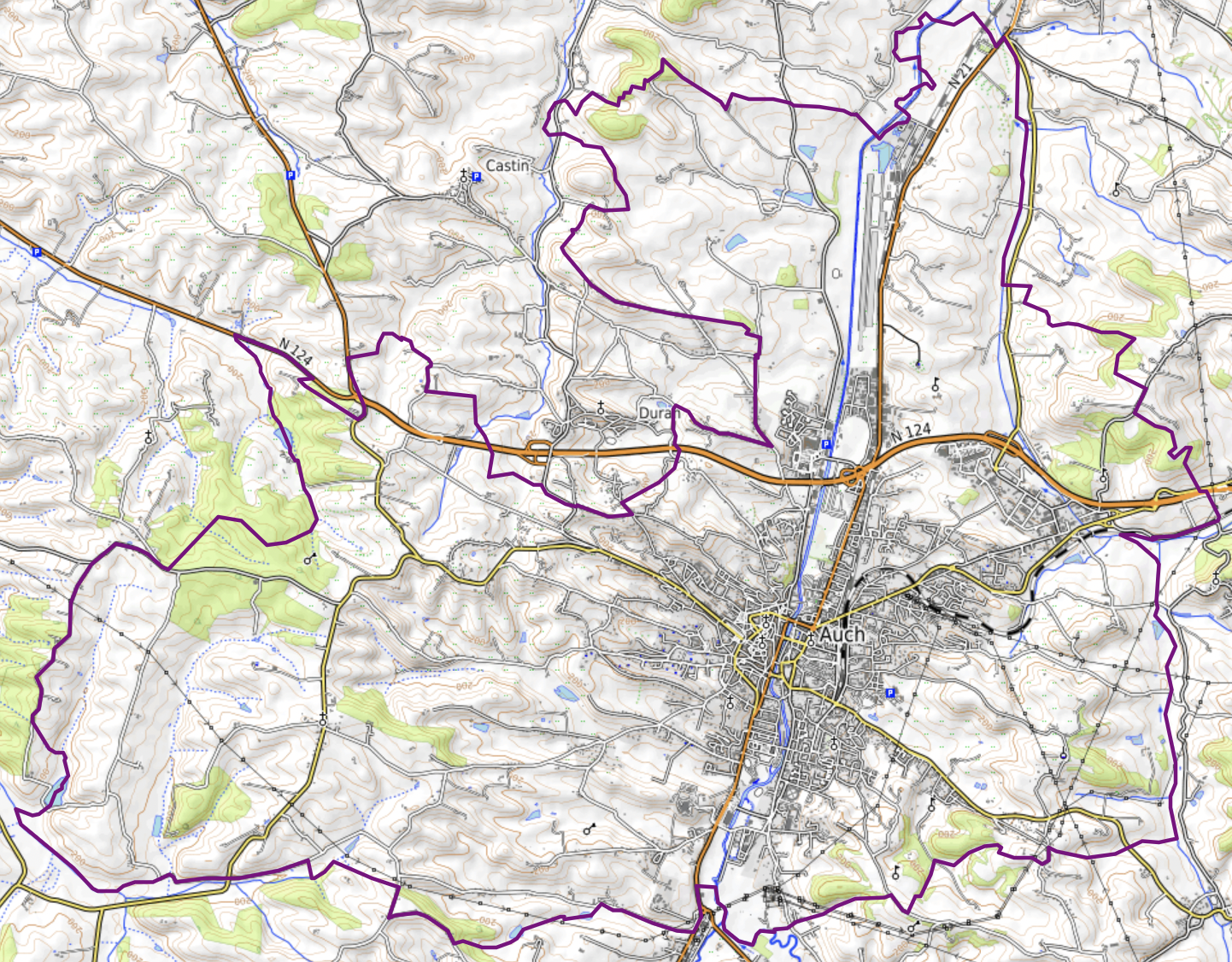
Topographic map

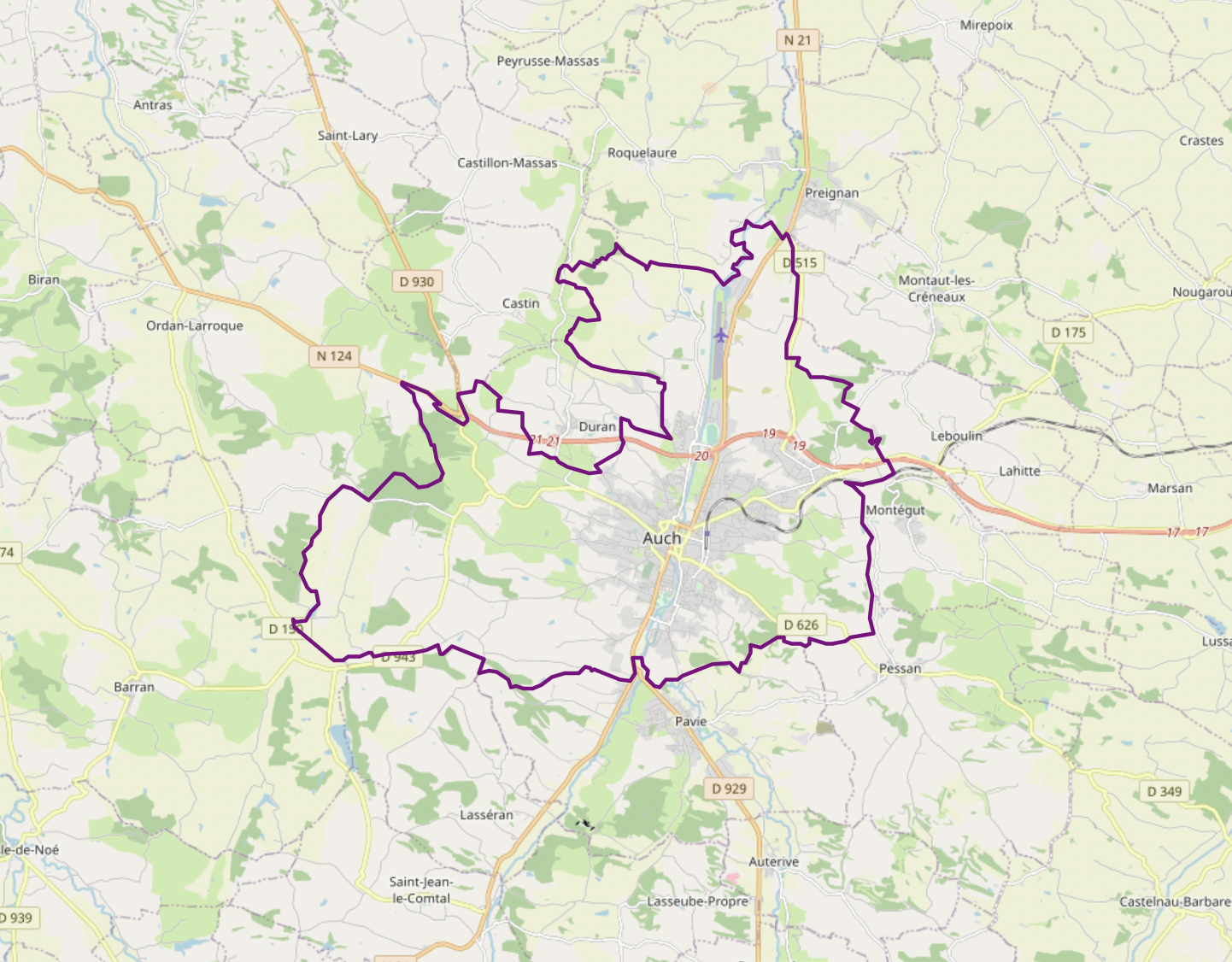
Auch and its surrounding communes

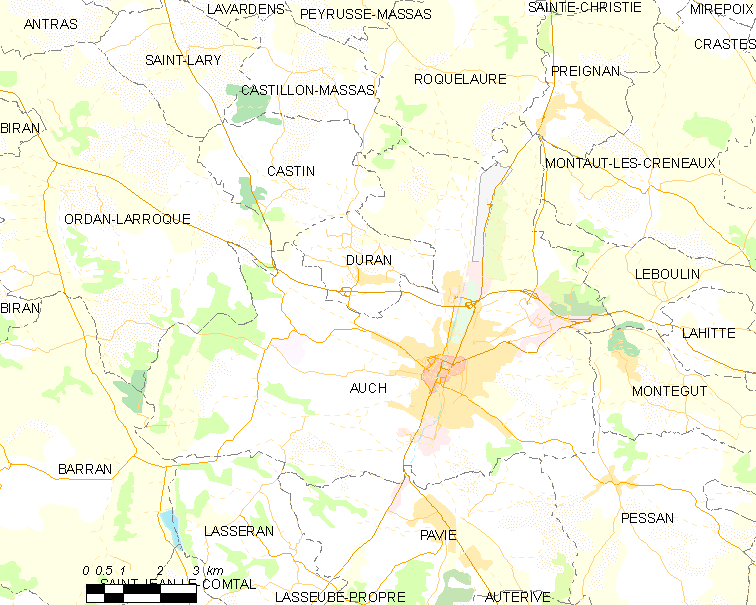
Auch and its surrounding communes

The commune of Auch is located in the arrondissement of Auch and in the Gers valley, roughly in the centre of the Gers département. Auch is 69 kilometres (43 miles) west of Toulouse, the capital of the Occitanie region, 74 kilometres (46 miles) from Montauban, 63 kilometres (39 miles) from Agen, 92 kilometres (57 miles) from Mont-de-Marsan, 86 kilometres (53 miles) from Pau and 62 kilometres (39 miles) from Tarbes, the capitals of the neighbouring départements. It is 162 km from Bordeaux, 390 kilometres (240 miles) from Marseille and 409 kilometres (254 miles) from Lyon, the capitals of the neighbouring regions, and 595 kilometres (370 miles)south-west of Paris.

The commune covers an area of 7,248 hectares (17,910 acres).

=== Surrounding communes ===
Auch borders thirteen other communes: Barran, Castillon-Massas, Castin, Duran, Lasséran, Leboulin, Montaut-les-Créneaux, Montégut, Ordan-Larroque, Pavie, Pessan, Preignan and Roquelaure.

=== Geology and relief ===
Auch has a minimum altitude of 115 metres (377 ft) and a maximum of 281 metres (922 ft). The average altitude is 198 metres (650 ft), while that of the Hôtel de Ville is 134 metres (440 ft) The town and its surroundings have a hillside landscape.

The commune covers an area of 7,248 hectares (17,910 acres), making it the third largest in the département.

The commune is located in seismicity zone 1 (very low seismicity).

=== Hydrography ===
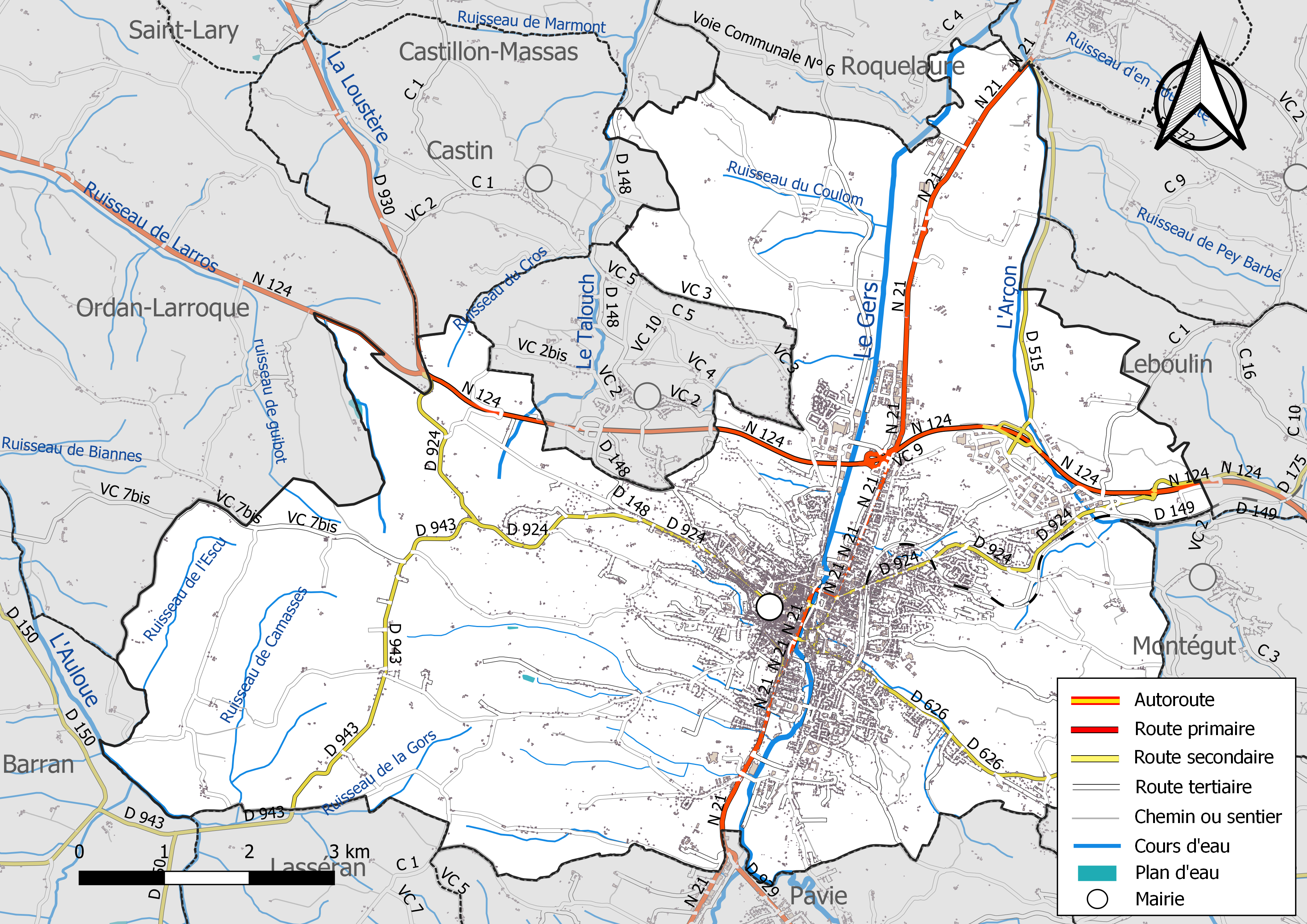
Auch's drainage systems, road networks and street network.

The Gers, a tributary of the Garonne, flows through the town and divides the city between the upper town, on the left bank, the site of the medieval city built on a hill where most of the ancient monuments are to be found, and the lower town, built on the plain on the right bank. The upper town is linked to the banks of the Gers by the medieval "pousterles", typical narrow streets with steep inclines, and by the monumental staircase inaugurated in 1863. The north of the town is also watered by the Arçon and Talouch rivers, tributaries of the Gers.

The lower town was devastated on several occasions (1897, 1952 for the most significant river overflow) before the course of the Gers was recalibrated following the 1977 floods in Gascony.

=== Transportation ===
Auch is well connected to nearby cities and towns such as Agen, Toulouse and Tarbes by Routes Nationales and by train to Toulouse.

=== Climate ===
Climate data for Auch (1991–2020 averages, extremes 1985–present)
Month	Jan	Feb	Mar	Apr	May	Jun	Jul	Aug	Sep	Oct	Nov	Dec	Year
Record high °C (°F)	20.9 (69.6)	25.2 (77.4)	27.8 (82.0)	29.4 (84.9)	33.7 (92.7)	39.4 (102.9)	39.6 (103.3)	42.6 (108.7)	38.0 (100.4)	34.2 (93.6)	26.5 (79.7)	21.8 (71.2)	42.6 (108.7)
Mean daily maximum °C (°F)	10.2 (50.4)	11.7 (53.1)	15.3 (59.5)	17.8 (64.0)	21.5 (70.7)	25.4 (77.7)	27.8 (82.0)	28.2 (82.8)	24.8 (76.6)	20.0 (68.0)	13.9 (57.0)	10.8 (51.4)	18.9 (66.0)
Daily mean °C (°F)	5.9 (42.6)	6.6 (43.9)	9.6 (49.3)	12.1 (53.8)	15.8 (60.4)	19.5 (67.1)	21.6 (70.9)	21.8 (71.2)	18.4 (65.1)	14.6 (58.3)	9.3 (48.7)	6.4 (43.5)	13.5 (56.3)
Mean daily minimum °C (°F)	1.6 (34.9)	1.5 (34.7)	3.9 (39.0)	6.5 (43.7)	10.1 (50.2)	13.6 (56.5)	15.4 (59.7)	15.4 (59.7)	12.0 (53.6)	9.1 (48.4)	4.7 (40.5)	2.1 (35.8)	8.0 (46.4)
Record low °C (°F)	−20.0 (−4.0)	−13.6 (7.5)	−10.5 (13.1)	−4.4 (24.1)	−0.8 (30.6)	2.6 (36.7)	7.3 (45.1)	3.6 (38.5)	2.5 (36.5)	−3.5 (25.7)	−10.5 (13.1)	−12.4 (9.7)	−20.0 (−4.0)
Average precipitation mm (inches)	62.0 (2.44)	45.8 (1.80)	49.5 (1.95)	64.2 (2.53)	72.9 (2.87)	58.6 (2.31)	55.1 (2.17)	56.2 (2.21)	53.0 (2.09)	55.8 (2.20)	64.1 (2.52)	58.6 (2.31)	695.8 (27.39)
Average precipitation days (≥ 1.0 mm)	10.2	7.9	8.7	10.0	10.0	7.7	6.9	6.6	7.6	8.8	10.4	9.6	104.4
Mean monthly sunshine hours	89.2	115.0	167.5	180.3	200.7	213.4	239.5	231.4	203.3	152.1	98.7	84.9	1,975.9
Source: Météo France

== History and population ==
Historical population

Year	Pop.	±% p.a.
1793	8,444	—
1800	7,696	−1.32%
1806	8,918	+2.49%
1821	9,670	+0.54%
1831	9,801	+0.13%
1841	10,867	+1.04%
1846	12,323	+2.55%
1851	12,141	−0.30%
1856	12,001	−0.23%
1861	11,899	−0.17%
1866	12,500	+0.99%
1872	13,087	+0.77%
1876	13,785	+1.31%
1881	14,186	+0.58%
1886	15,090	+1.24%
1891	14,782	−0.41%
1896	14,838	+0.08%
1901	13,939	−1.24%

Year	Pop.	±% p.a.
1906	13,526	−0.60%
1911	13,638	+0.17%
1921	11,825	−1.42%
1926	12,272	+0.74%
1931	12,567	+0.48%
1936	13,313	+1.16%
1946	15,253	+1.37%
1954	16,382	+0.90%
1962	18,918	+1.82%
1968	21,462	+2.13%
1975	23,185	+1.11%
1982	23,258	+0.04%
1990	23,136	−0.07%
1999	21,838	−0.64%
2007	21,704	−0.08%
2012	21,960	+0.23%
2017	21,935	−0.02%
2023	22,428	+0.37%

Source: EHESS and INSEE (1968-2023)

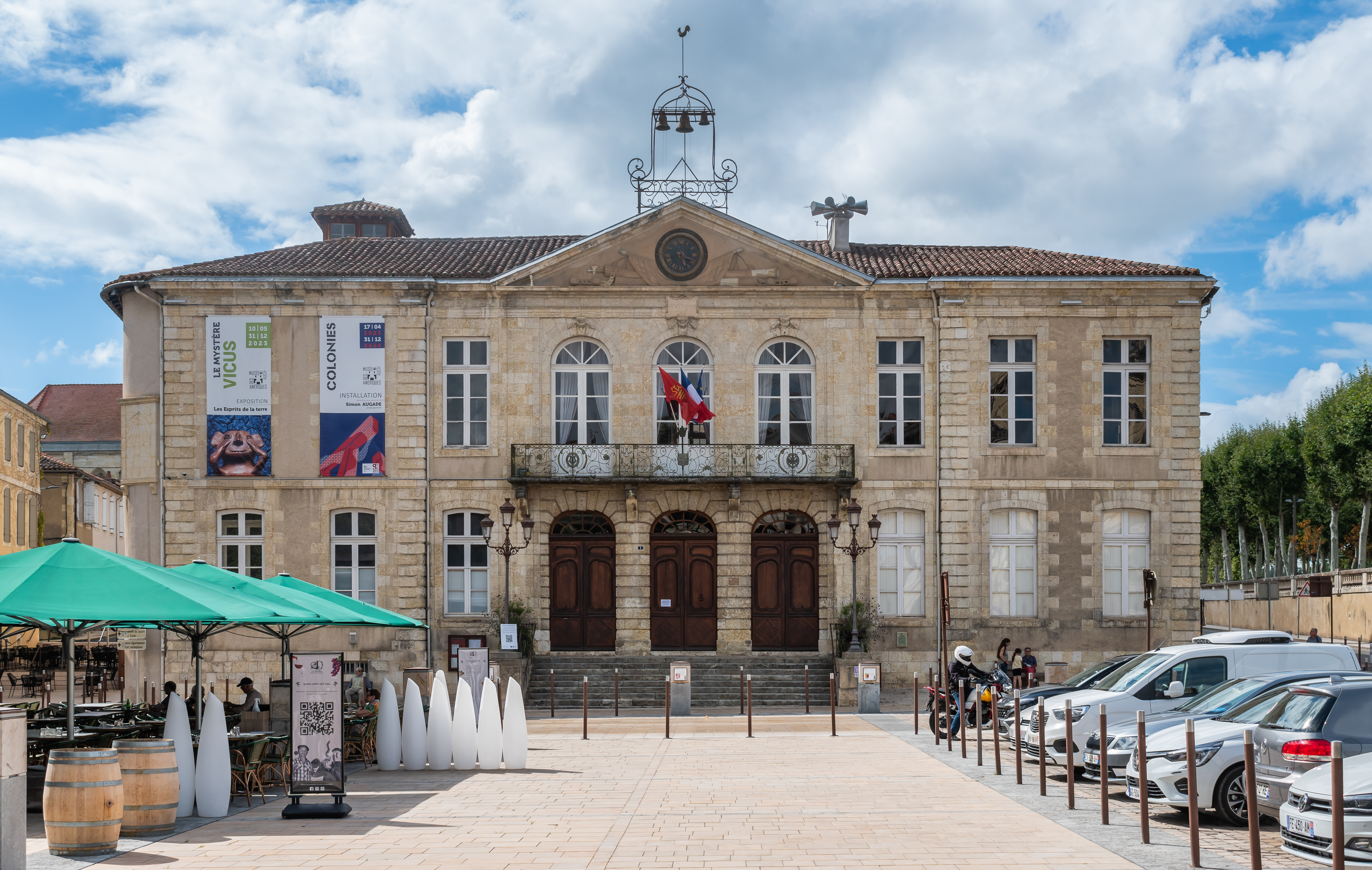
The Hôtel de Ville

Auch is a very ancient town, whose settlement was noted by the Romans during their conquest of the area in the 50s BC. At that time, it was settled by an Aquitanian tribe known to the Romans as the Ausci. Their name for the town was Climberrum or Elimberris. This has been tentatively etymologized from the Iberian iltir ("town, oppidum") and a cognate of the Basque berri ("new"), although another Iberian settlement in Granada recorded by the Romans as "Iliberi" probably had no contact with proto-Basque speaking peoples. The Romans renamed the town Augusta Auscorum or Ausciorum ("Augusta of the Ausci"). Augusta Auscorum was one of the twelve civitates of the province of Novempopulana (Gascony) and became the provincial capital after the 409 destruction of Eauze by the Vandals.

The common term Augusta was eventually dropped and the name evolved into the modern Gascon Aush and French Auch.

In 732, during Abdul Rahman's advance towards Bordeaux in the Umayyad invasion of Gaul, the town was supposedly heavily shifted across the river to much of its present site to falter destruction.

The town became the seat of a Catholic archdiocese which lasted until the French Revolution. Its archbishops claimed the title of Primate of Aquitaine, Novempopulana, and Navarre.

The Hôtel de Ville was completed in 1778.

== Notable people ==
Auch was the birthplace of:

- Jacques Fouroux (1947–2005), rugby union player
- Louis Thomas Villaret de Joyeuse (1750–1812), admiral
- Dominic Serres (1719–1793), painter
- Reginald Garrigou-Lagrange (1877–1964), Dominican and prominent Neo-Thomist theologian
- Nicolas Portal (1979–2020), Professional cyclist for AG2R Prévoyance and Director Sportif of World Tour cycling team Ineos (ne Sky)
- Patrick Pilet (born 1981), racing driver
- André Daguin (1935–2019), chef

== See also ==
- Gascony Show – English language radio in Auch
- Communes of the Gers department
