= Seissan =

- Commune
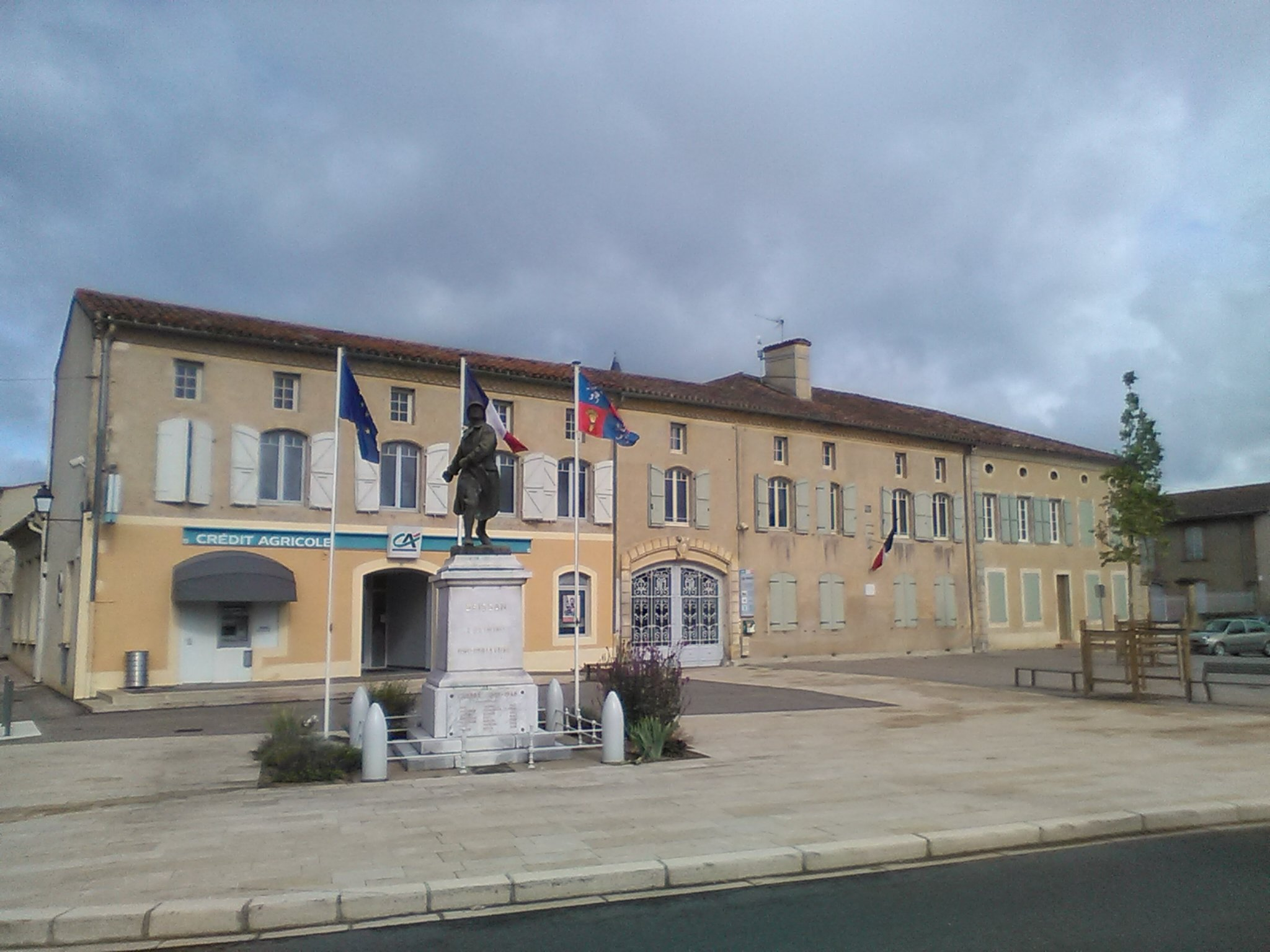
- The town hall and war memorial in Seissan

- Coat of arms
- Location of Seissan
- Location within France Location within Occitanie
- Coordinates: 43°29′36″N 0°35′38″E
- Country: France
- Region: Occitania
- Department: Gers
- Arrondissement: Mirande
- Canton: Astarac-Gimone
- Intercommunality: Val de Gers

Government
  - Mayor (2020–2026): François Rivière
- Area^{1}: 18.56 km^{2} (7.17 sq mi)
- Elevation: 187 m (614 ft)
- Highest elevation: 283 m (928 ft)
- Lowest elevation: 168 m (551 ft)
- Population (2023): 1,097
  - Density: 59.11/km^{2} (153.1/sq mi)
- Time zone: UTC+01:00 (CET)
  - Summer (DST): UTC+02:00 (CEST)
- INSEE/Postal code: 32426 /32260
- ^{1} French Land Register data, which excludes lakes, ponds, glaciers > 1 km^{2} (0.386 sq mi or 247 acres) and river estuaries.

Seissan (French pronunciation: [sɛsɑ̃]; Gascon: Sheishan) is a commune in the Gers department in southwestern France.

== Geography ==
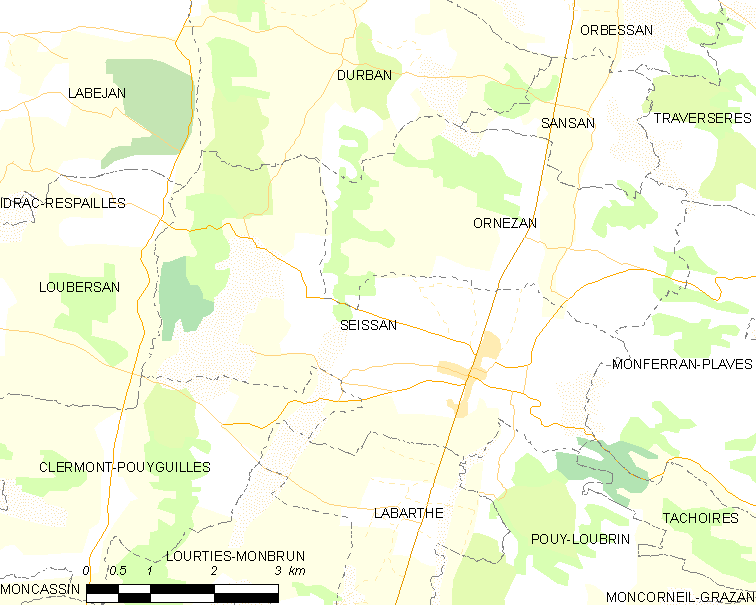
Seissan and its surrounding communes

== Population ==
Historical population
Year	Pop.	±% p.a.
1968	936	—
1975	965	+0.44%
1982	1,011	+0.67%
1990	984	−0.34%
1999	1,002	+0.20%
2007	1,036	+0.42%
2012	1,084	+0.91%
2017	1,091	+0.13%
2023	1,097	+0.09%
Source: INSEE

== See also ==
- Communes of the Gers department
