= 2024 French legislative election in Gers =

Following the first round of the 2024 French legislative election on 30 June 2024, runoff elections in each constituency where no candidate received a vote share greater than 50 percent were scheduled for 7 July. Candidates permitted to stand in the runoff elections needed to either come in first or second place in the first round or achieve more than 12.5 percent of the votes of the entire electorate (as opposed to 12.5 percent of the vote share due to low turnout).

== Gers ==
=== 1st constituency ===
| Candidate | Party or alliance | | First round | | Second round | |
| Candidate | Party or alliance | | Votes | % | Votes | % |
|---|---|---|---|---|---|---|
| Jean-Luc Yelma | National Rally | | 18,575 | 35.71 | 20,720 | 41.52 |
| Jean-René Cazeneuve | Ensemble | Renaissance | 16,072 | 30.90 | 29,185 | 58.48 |
| Pascal Levieux | New Popular Front | La France Insoumise | 14,129 | 27.17 | | |
| Alexis Boudaud Anduaga | Ecologists | | 1,375 | 2.64 | | |
| Ludovic Larré | Regionalists | Independent | 959 | 1.84 | | |
| Aurore Cazes | Reconquête | | 587 | 1.13 | | |
| Jean-Louis Chareton | Far-left | Lutte Ouvrière | 296 | 0.57 | | |
| Adrien Aymes | Regionalists | Independent | 16 | 0.03 | | |
| Total | | | 52,009 | 100.00 | 49,905 | 100.00 |
| Valid votes | | | 52,009 | 96.03 | 49,905 | 92.29 |
| Invalid votes | | | 769 | 1.42 | 1,244 | 2.30 |
| Blank votes | | | 1,382 | 2.55 | 2,926 | 5.41 |
| Total votes | | | 54,160 | 100.00 | 54,075 | 100.00 |
| Registered voters/turnout | | | 73,258 | 73.93 | 73,224 | 73.85 |

=== 2nd constituency ===
| Candidate | Party or alliance | | First round | | Second round | |
| Candidate | Party or alliance | | Votes | % | Votes | % |
|---|---|---|---|---|---|---|
| David Taupiac | Miscellaneous left | Socialist Party (Note: Dissident who ran separate from the New Popular Front list) | 24,185 | 45.80 | 30,912 | 59.37 |
| Alice Cendré | National Rally | | 18,739 | 35.49 | 21,154 | 40.63 |
| Barbara Neto | The Republicans | | 7,416 | 14.04 | | |
| Jean-Luc Davezac | Regionalists | Independent | 1,293 | 2.45 | | |
| Martine Arnaudy | Reconquête | | 679 | 1.29 | | |
| Michèle Martin | Far-left | Lutte Ouvrière | 481 | 0.91 | | |
| Abla Lazorat | Regionalists | Independent | 13 | 0.02 | | |
| Total | | | 52,806 | 100.00 | 52,066 | 100.00 |
| Valid votes | | | 52,806 | 97.21 | 52,066 | 95.65 |
| Invalid votes | | | 436 | 0.80 | 697 | 1.28 |
| Blank votes | | | 1,082 | 1.99 | 1,673 | 3.07 |
| Total votes | | | 54,324 | 100.00 | 54,436 | 100.00 |
| Registered voters/turnout | | | 73,646 | 73.76 | 73,653 | 73.91 |
