= Jean Laborde (politician) =

French politician (1922–2022)

Mayor of Auch
- In office 21 March 1977 – 19 June 1995
- Preceded by: Jean Dours
- Succeeded by: Claude Desbons

Member of the French National Assembly
- In office 2 April 1973 – 1 April 1993
- Preceded by: Paul Vignaux
- Succeeded by: Yves Rispat
- Constituency: Gers's 1st constituency

Personal details
- Born: 8 March 1922 Bouzon-Gellenave, France
- Died: 18 January 2022 (aged 99) Auch, France
- Party: PS

Jean Laborde (8 March 1922 – 18 January 2022) was a French politician.

He was born in Bouzon-Gellenave on 8 March 1922 into a family of farmers. During World War II, Laborde participated in the French Resistance. After the war, he became a doctor and later joined the Socialist Party. In 1973, he was elected to the National Assembly in Gers's 1st constituency. In 1977, he was elected mayor of Auch. He retired from politics in 1995.

He died in Auch on 18 January 2022, at the age of 99.
