= Gascony Show =

The Gascony Show
- Genre: Talk
- Running time: Sundays 5pm-7pm CET
- Country of origin: France
- Language: English
- Home station: Radio Coteaux
- Starring: John Slattery
- Produced by: Patrick Martinez
- Recording studio: Radio Coteaux Studios, Saint-Blancard
- Original release: 10 July 2011
- Audio format: FM and Digital radio
- Website: Official website
- Podcast: Official podcast

The Gascony Show is an English-language radio chat show aired in the southwest of France and a flagship Sunday evening programme broadcast on Radio Coteaux in the Gascony region. The show is presented by Irishman John Slattery.

== The show ==
The Gascony Show host, John Slattery, in the studio in Saint Blancard

John Slattery takes over the airwaves at 5pm and finishes at 7pm with a handover to Patrick Martinez. The Gascony Show is a music-based programme that includes light-hearted banter and whimsical jokes by the host. Listeners' views and comments are discussed and there are rotating segments such as "Song of The Week" and "Life in the South-West". To keep listeners on their toes, random topics are picked from a big "Bag O Topics."

Podcasts of all previous shows are available on the show's website so that previous shows can be listened to again. Previous shows can also be found on iTunes.

== Invited guests ==
The show runs interviews with regular and/or rotating guests, dealing with subjects of both local interest and of general interest to the expatriate community. The first person to be interviewed on the show was the illustrious English painter, interior designer and writer, Stella Wulf. Stella is the author of "The Lonesome Froom and other Strange Tales," "Rum Rhymes and Vagabond" and "The Song of the Froom." She recounted humorous stories of her years in France and her efforts to get her books published.

Subsequent interviews included music industry notaries such as Joy Askew and her brother Roger Askew. These two truly multi-dimensional singers sang some of their favourite songs on air. Joy, who worked closely with the likes of Peter Gabriel and Joe Jackson, and fronted the all-girl rock band called Bitch, told her story of life as a songwriter and touring musician. The interview proved enormously popular with both English and French speaking listeners in France and it served to create a pattern of story telling and musical treats that would become an underlying trait of later interviews.

A highly commended interview was that with Leaf Fielding, one of the drug-dealers jailed as a result of the famous 1977 drug cartel bust in the UK called Operation Julie. The interview revolved around Leaf's life, his descent into drug dealing, his imprisonment, and his new life in France. Also discussed was Leaf's book To Live Outside The Law, that tells the story from his early days and his first experience with LSD, to his amazing falling from grace.

== Regular contributors ==
The show relies heavily on e-mailed material sent in by listeners that is then read out on air, and most of the regular contributors are local expatriates living in the Gascony region.

== See also ==
- The Flattery Show
