= Flattery (disambiguation) =

Flattery is the act of giving excessive compliments.

Flattery or Flatterer may also refer to:

- Flattery (film), a 1925 American silent film
- Flatterer (horse), a racehorse
- Willie Flattery (1904–1957), American football player
- The Flattery Show, a radio show aired in France
- "Flattery", a track on the Aly & AJ album Insomniatic

== See also ==
- Cape Flattery (disambiguation)
