= Gisèle Biémouret =

French politician (born 1952)

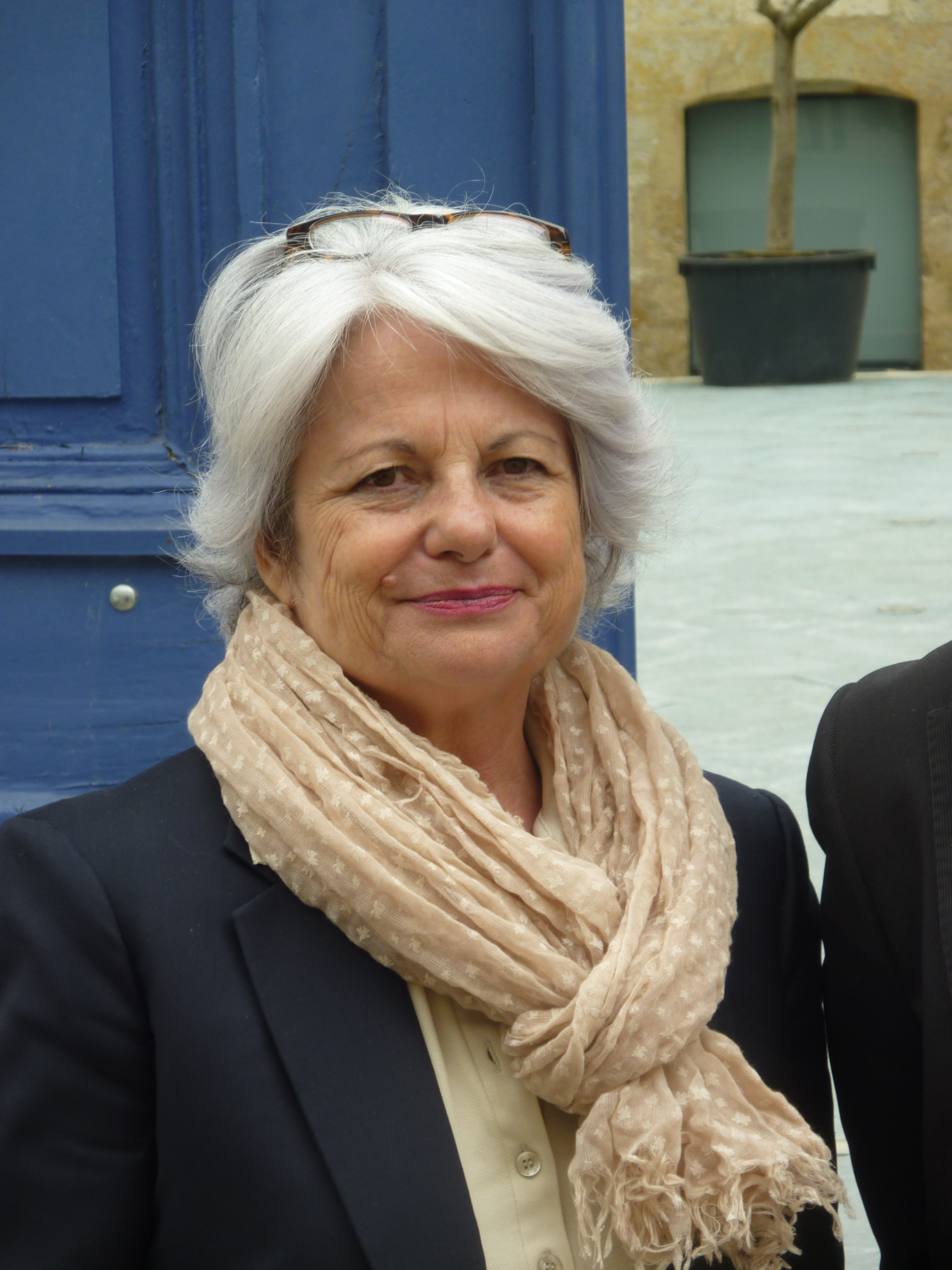

Member of the National Assembly for Gers's 2nd constituency
- In office 20 June 2007 – 21 June 2022
- Preceded by: Gérard Dubrac
- Succeeded by: David Taupiac

Personal details
- Born: 16 July 1952 (age 73) Fleurance, Gers, France
- Party: Socialist

Gisèle Biémouret (born 16 June 1952) is a French politician who was member of the National Assembly of France for Gers's 2nd constituency from 2007 to 2022. She is a member of the SRC parliamentary group.

She didn't stand for re-election in the 2022 French legislative election.
