= Monbardon =

- Part of Cap d'Astarac
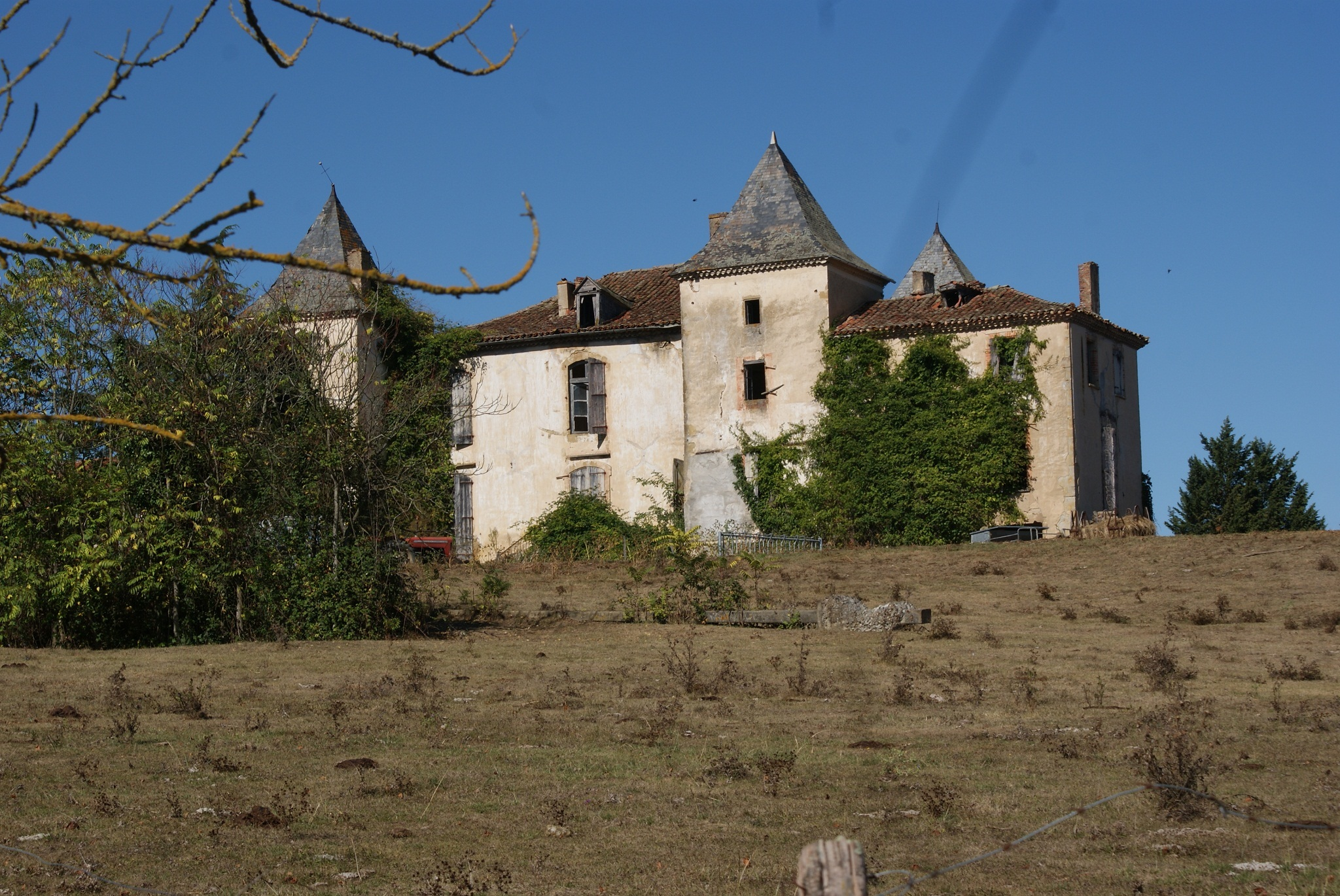
- The castle
- Location of Monbardon
- Location within France Location within Occitanie
- Coordinates: 43°22′57″N 0°42′36″E
- Country: France
- Region: Occitania
- Department: Gers
- Arrondissement: Mirande
- Canton: Astarac-Gimone
- Commune: Cap d'Astarac
- Area^{1}: 6.41 km^{2} (2.47 sq mi)
- Elevation: 275 m (902 ft)
- Highest elevation: 316 m (1,037 ft)
- Lowest elevation: 216 m (709 ft)
- Population (2022): 69
  - Density: 11/km^{2} (28/sq mi)
- Time zone: UTC+01:00 (CET)
  - Summer (DST): UTC+02:00 (CEST)
- Postal code: 32420
- ^{1} French Land Register data, which excludes lakes, ponds, glaciers > 1 km^{2} (0.386 sq mi or 247 acres) and river estuaries.

Monbardon (French pronunciation: [mɔ̃baʁdɔ̃]; Gascon: Montbardon) is a former commune in the Gers department in southwestern France. It was merged into the new commune Cap d'Astarac on 1 January 2025.

== See also ==
- Communes of the Gers department
