= Gers's 1st constituency =

Constituency of the National Assembly of France

1st constituency of Gers
- inline Constituency of the National Assembly of France

- Location of constituency in Department

- Location of Gers in France
- Deputy: Jean-René Cazeneuve; RE
- Department: Gers
- Cantons: (pre-2015) Aignan, Auch-Nord-Est, Auch-Nord-Ouest, Auch-Sud-Est-Seissan, Auch-Sud-Ouest, Lombez, Marciac, Masseube, Miélan, Mirande, Montesquiou, Nogaro, Plaisance, Riscle, Samatan, Saramon
- Registered voters: 90,434

The 1st constituency of Gers is a French legislative constituency in the Gers département.

== Deputies ==
Election	Member	Party	Notes
1988	Jean Laborde	PS	
1993	Yves Rispat	RPR	
1997	Claude Desbons	PS	
2002	Philippe Martin	PS	
2007	Philippe Martin	PS	
2012	Philippe Martin	PS	
2013	Franck Montaugé	PS	Replaced Philippe Martin while he was Minister of Ecology, Sustainable Development and Energy
2014	Philippe Martin	PS	
2017	Jean-René Cazeneuve	LREM	
2022	Jean-René Cazeneuve	RE	
2024	Jean-René Cazeneuve	RE	

== Election results ==
=== 2024 ===
Candidate	Party	Alliance	First round			Second round		
Candidate	Party	Alliance	Votes	%	+/–	Votes	%	+/–
Jean-Luc Yelma	RN		18,575	35.71	+24.60	20,720	41.52	new
Jean-René Cazeneuve	REN	Ensemble	16,072	30.90	-0.59	29,185	58.48	+5.97
Pascal Levieux	LFI	NFP	14,129	27.17	+1.73			
Alexis Boudaud Anduaga	ECO		1,375	2.64	new			
Ludovic Larré	DIV		959	1.84	new			
Aurore Cazes	REC		587	1.13	-3.78			
Jean-Louis Chareton	LO		296	0.57	-0.02			
Adrien Aymes	DIV		16	0.03	new			
Votes			52,009	100.00		49,905	100.00	
Valid votes			52,009	96.03	-0.36	49,905	92.29	+3.49
Blank votes			1,382	2.55	-0.01	2,926	5.41	-2.17
Null votes			769	1.42	-0.37	1,244	2.30	-1.32
Turnout			54,160	73.93	+17.47	54,075	73.85	+19.16
Abstentions			19,098	26.07	-17.47	19,149	26.15	-19.16
Registered voters			73,258			73,224		
Result			RE HOLD					

=== 2022 ===
Legislative Election 2022: Gers's 1st constituency
Party	Candidate	Votes	%	±%
LREM (Ensemble)	Jean-René Cazeneuve	12,648	31.49	-1.50
LFI (NUPÉS)	Pascal Levieux	10,219	25.44	-9.93
RN	Jean-Luc Yelma	8,202	20.42	+9.65
PRG	Sylvie Theye	4,060	10.11	N/A
REC	Aurore Cazes	1,971	4.91	N/A
DIV	Nadine Larre	1,236	3.08	N/A
Others	N/A	1,834	4.57	
Turnout		40,170	56.46	−1.80
2nd round result
LREM (Ensemble)	Jean-René Cazeneuve	18,822	52.51	-6.74
LFI (NUPÉS)	Pascal Levieux	17,025	47.49	+6.74
Turnout		35,847	54.69	+3.57
LREM hold				

=== 2017 ===
Candidate	Label	First round		Second round	
Candidate	Label	Votes	%	Votes	%
Jean-René Cazeneuve	REM	13,749	32.99	19,133	59.25
Francis Dupouey	PS	7,076	16.98	13,159	40.75
Christophe Terrain	UDI	6,437	15.45		
Pascal Pénétro	FI	5,186	12.44		
Nathalie Pierreisnard	FN	4,488	10.77		
Sylviane Baudois	ECO	1,675	4.02		
Romain Duport	DIV	1,283	3.08		
Annabelle Skowronek	PCF	806	1.93		
Benoît Matharan	DIV	545	1.31		
Jean-Louis Chareton	EXG	263	0.63		
Vivien Perez	DLF	165	0.40		
Votes		41,673	100.00	32,292	100.00
Valid votes		41,673	97.31	32,292	85.94
Blank votes		799	1.87	3,579	9.52
Null votes		353	0.82	1,706	4.54
Turnout		42,825	58.26	37,577	51.12
Abstentions		30,685	41.74	35,926	48.88
Registered voters		73,510		73,503	
Source: Ministry of the Interior

=== 2012 ===
2012 legislative election in Gers's 1st constituency
Candidate	Party	First round	
Candidate	Party	Votes	%
Philippe Martin	PS	23,651	52.36%
Douce De Franclieu	UMP	9,453	20.93%
Marcelle Girot	FN	4,424	9.79%
Maryse Dellac	FG	2,556	5.66%
Philippe Le Goanvic	EELV	1,642	3.64%
Eliane Crepel	MoDem	1,004	2.22%
Florence Giroir	PR	734	1.63%
Jean Falco		590	1.31%
Sylvie Cabella	DLR	576	1.28%
Annie-Claude Prevot	AEI	334	0.74%
Jean-Louis Chareton	LO	204	0.45%
Valid votes		45,168	97.39%
Spoilt and null votes		1,209	2.61%
Votes cast / turnout		46,377	62.97%
Abstentions		27,270	37.03%
Registered voters		73,647	100.00%

=== 2007 ===
Legislative Election 2007: Gers 1st - 2nd round
Party	Candidate	Votes	%	±%
PS	Philippe Martin	28,286	58.89	
UMP	Anne-Marie Mouchet	19,746	41.11	
Turnout		49,685	68.80	
PS hold		Swing		
