= Cabas-Loumassès =

- Part of Cap d'Astarac
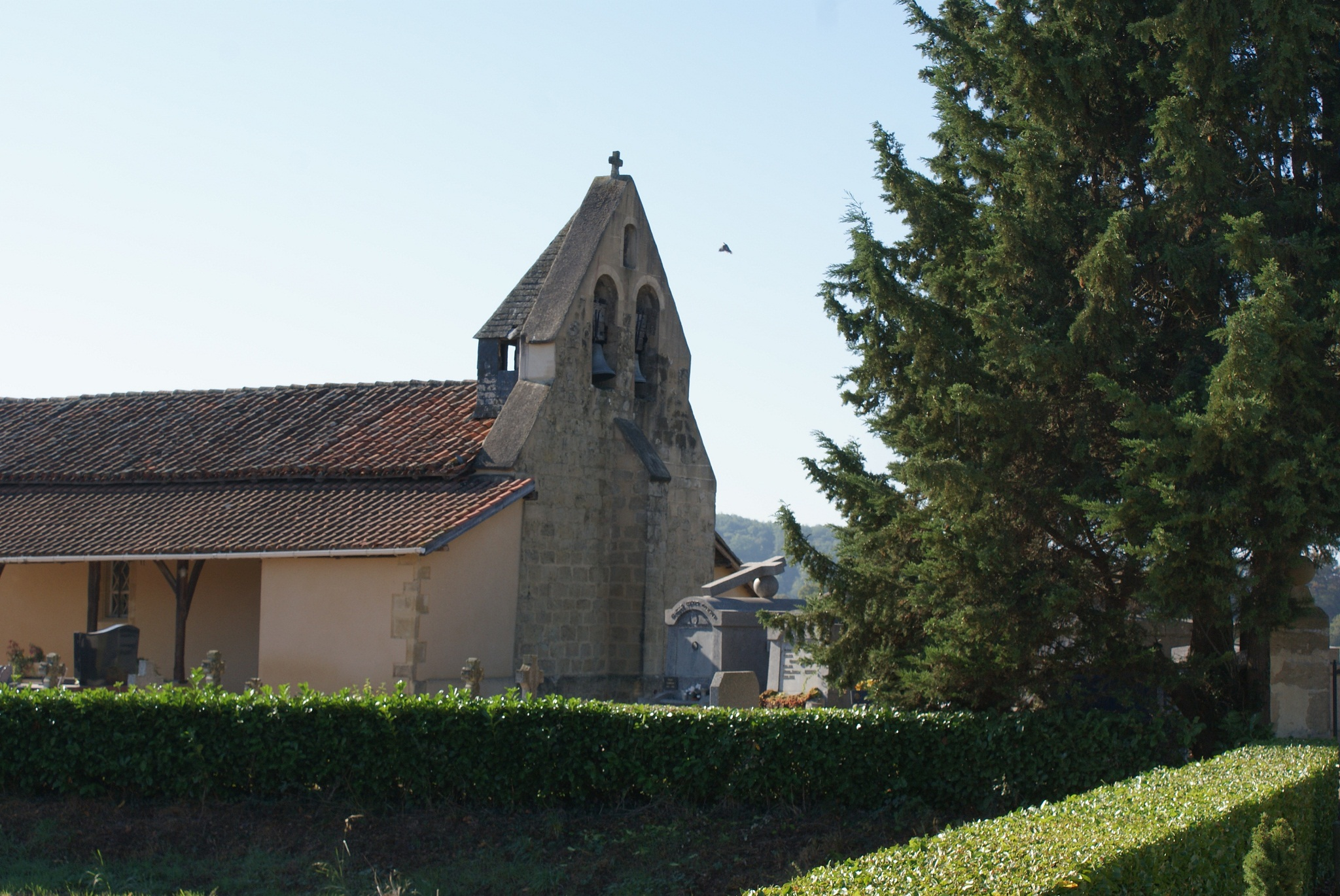
- The church in Cabas-Loumassès
- Location of Cabas-Loumassès
- Location within France Location within Occitanie
- Coordinates: 43°21′17″N 0°35′59″E
- Country: France
- Region: Occitania
- Department: Gers
- Arrondissement: Mirande
- Canton: Astarac-Gimone
- Commune: Cap d'Astarac
- Area^{1}: 4.11 km^{2} (1.59 sq mi)
- Elevation: 304 m (997 ft)
- Highest elevation: 312 m (1,024 ft)
- Lowest elevation: 245 m (804 ft)
- Population (2022): 48
  - Density: 12/km^{2} (30/sq mi)
- Time zone: UTC+01:00 (CET)
  - Summer (DST): UTC+02:00 (CEST)
- Postal code: 32140
- ^{1} French Land Register data, which excludes lakes, ponds, glaciers > 1 km^{2} (0.386 sq mi or 247 acres) and river estuaries.

Cabas-Loumassès is a former commune in the Gers department in southwestern France. It was merged into the new commune Cap d'Astarac on 1 January 2025.

== Geography ==
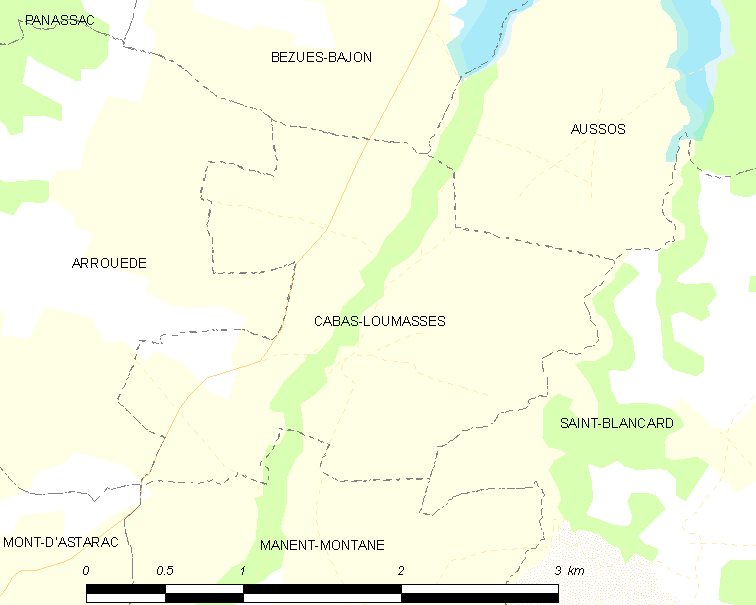
Cabas-Loumassès and its surrounding communes

== Population ==
Historical population
Year	Pop.	±% p.a.
1968	90	—
1975	83	−1.15%
1982	72	−2.01%
1990	56	−3.09%
1999	50	−1.25%
2007	48	−0.51%
2012	51	+1.22%
2017	52	+0.39%
Source: INSEE

== See also ==
- Communes of the Gers department
