= Cap d'Astarac =

- Commune
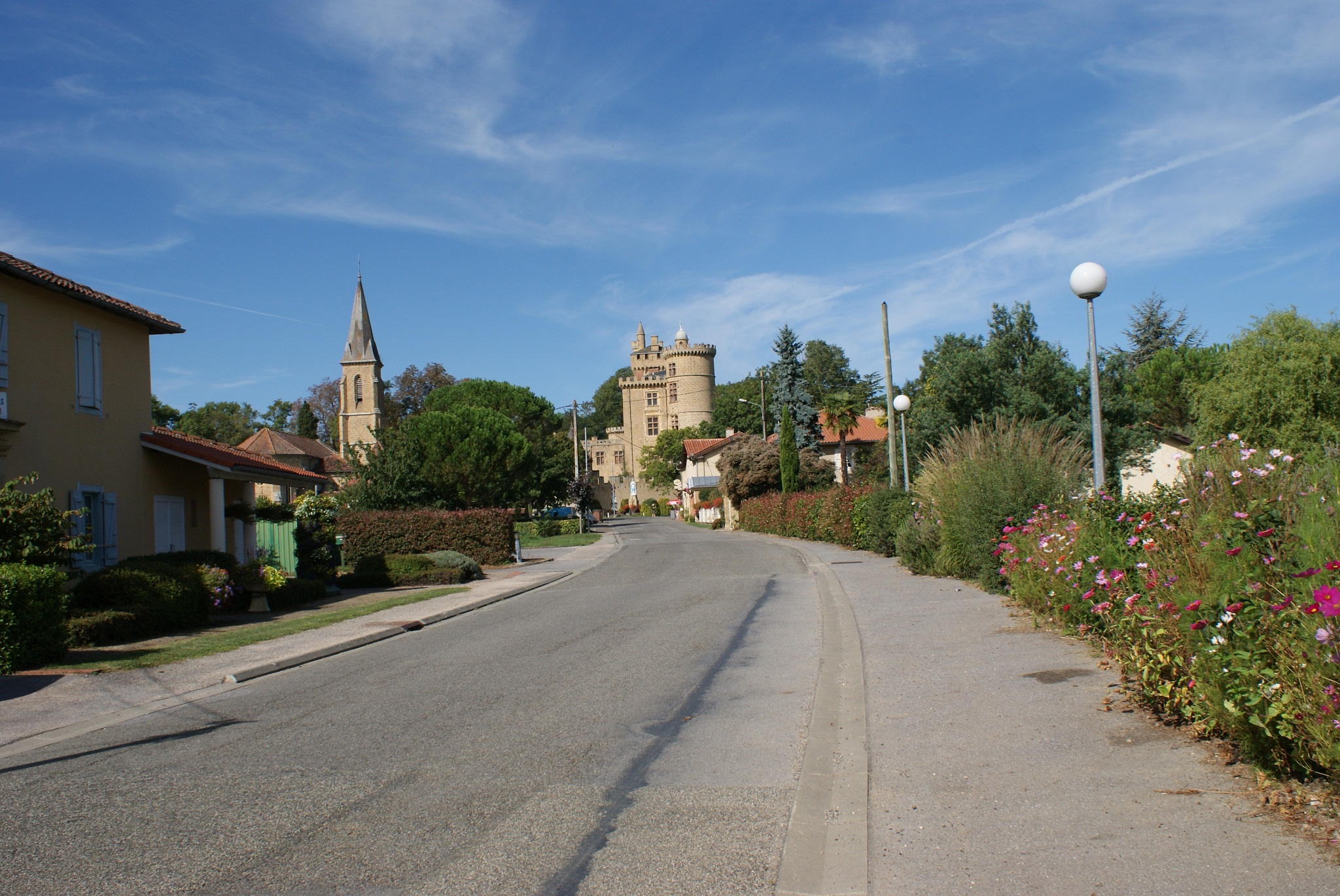
- The main road in Saint-Blancard
- Location of Cap d'Astarac
- Location within France Location within Occitanie
- Coordinates: 43°20′42″N 0°38′51″E
- Country: France
- Region: Occitania
- Department: Gers
- Arrondissement: Mirande
- Canton: Astarac-Gimone
- Intercommunality: CC Val de Gers
- Area^{1}: 31.80 km^{2} (12.28 sq mi)
- Highest elevation: 357 m (1,171 ft)
- Lowest elevation: 216 m (709 ft)
- Population (2023): 460
  - Density: 14/km^{2} (37/sq mi)
- Time zone: UTC+01:00 (CET)
  - Summer (DST): UTC+02:00 (CEST)
- INSEE/Postal code: 32365 /32140
- ^{1} French Land Register data, which excludes lakes, ponds, glaciers > 1 km^{2} (0.386 sq mi or 247 acres) and river estuaries.

Cap d'Astarac (French pronunciation: [kap dastaʁak]) is a commune in the Gers department in the Occitanie region in southwestern France. It was formed on 1 January 2025, with the merger of Saint-Blancard, Sarcos, Monbardon and Cabas-Loumassès.

== See also ==
- Communes of the Gers department
