= Jean Laborde (disambiguation) =

Jean Laborde was a French adventurer and industrialist.

Jean Laborde may also refer to:

- Jean Laborde (journalist) (1918–2007), French journalist and writer
- Jean Laborde (politician) (1922–2022), French politician
- Jean Laborde, original name of MTS Oceanos, a cruise ship

== See also ==
- Jean de Laborde (1878–1977), French admiral
- Jean Joseph de Laborde, Marquis of Laborde (1724–1794), French businessman, slave trader, tax farmer, banker to the king and politician
