= Sarcos =

Sarcos may refer to:

- Sarcos, Gers, a commune in France
- Ivian Sarcos
- Daniel Sarcos
- Sarcos, former name for Palladyne AI Corp.
