= Philippe Martin (politician) =

French politician

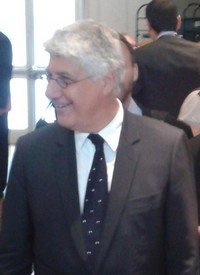
- Philippe Martin in 2013

Minister of Ecology, Sustainable Development and Energy
- In office 2 July 2013 – 31 March 2014
- President: François Hollande
- Prime Minister: Jean-Marc Ayrault
- Preceded by: Delphine Batho
- Succeeded by: Ségolène Royal

Member of the National Assembly for Gers's 1st constituency
- In office 2002–2013
- Preceded by: Claude Desbons
- Succeeded by: Franck Montaugé
- In office 2014–2017
- Preceded by: Franck Montaugé
- Succeeded by: Jean-René Cazeneuve

Personal details
- Born: 22 November 1953 (age 72) La Garenne-Colombes, France
- Party: Socialist Party

Philippe Martin (French pronunciation: [filip maʁtɛ̃]; born 22 November 1953) is a French politician of the Socialist Party (PS) who has been serving as president of the French Agency for Biodiversity (AFB) since 2017. Prior this, he served as Minister for Environment, Sustainable Development and Energy in the government of Prime Minister of France Jean-Marc Ayrault from 2013 to 2014.

== Political career ==
Martin was prefect of Gers department from 1992 to 1994 and prefect of Landes department from 1994 to 1995.

Martin was a member of the National Assembly from 2002 until 2013, representing Gers's 1st constituency. In parliament, he was a member of the "Socialist, Radical, Citizen and Miscellaneous Left" (SRC) political group and served on the Finance Committee.

During his brief term as minister, Martin put off plans for France's transition towards less carbon-intensive energy sources until 2014. In 2014, as part of a wider effort to deter poachers and traffickers, Martin publicly destroyed a stock of about three tons of confiscated ivory from the tusks of African elephants, making France the first European country to take such a step. Shortly after, in an effort to protect the citizens of Paris against pollution triggered by an exceptionally warm spring, he ordered a 20 kilometer-hour reduction of the speed limits, made parking free in the city and diverted large trucks from the city.

== Political positions ==
Martin is a fierce critic of genetically modified organisms (GMO).

On 1 July 2012, Martin asked French restaurateurs and wine merchants to stop selling Californian wines in protest against the entry into force of a California law prohibiting the sale of foie gras on grounds of animal welfare.

In the Socialist Party's 2017 primaries, Martin publicly endorsed Benoît Hamon as the party's candidate for the French presidential election later that year.
