= The Flattery Show =

- Genre: Talk
- Running time: Sundays 5pm-7pm CET
- Country of origin: France
- Language: English
- Home station: Radio Coteaux
- Starring: John Slattery & Patricia McKinnes
- Produced by: Patrick Martinez
- Recording studio: Radio Coteaux Studios, Saint-Blancard
- Original release: 6 February 2011
- Audio format: FM and Digital radio
- Website: Official website
- Podcast: Official podcast

The Flattery Show was the first English-language radio chat show aired in the south west of France and a flagship Sunday evening programme broadcast on Radio Coteaux in the Gascony region. The show was presented by Irish radio presenter John Slattery with American co-host Patricia McKinnes. It ran for twenty-one weeks and proved to be very popular with expatriates living in France.

== The show ==
Slattery and McKinnes regularly began the show at 5pm and finished at 7pm with a handover to Patrick Martinez. The Flattery Show was a music-based programme that included light-hearted banter and whimsical jokes by the hosts. Listeners' views and comments were discussed and there were rotating segments such as "Song of The Week", "Ask a Frenchie" and "Life in the South-West". To keep listeners on their toes, random topics were picked from a big "Bag O' Topics".

== Invited guests ==
The show ran interviews with regular and/or rotating guests, dealing with subjects of both local interest and of general interest to the expatriate community. The first people to be interviewed on the show were the English sisters Marcha King and Sian Cash, former proprietors of the landmark café "Bar Memory" in the Hautes-Pyrénées town of Castelnau-Magnoac. They recounted humorous stories of their years behind the bar at the French café. The interview proved enormously popular with English-speaking listeners in France and it served to create a pattern of jesting and buffoonery that would become an underlying trait of later interviews.

== Regular contributors ==
The show relied heavily on e-mailed material sent in by listeners that was then read out on air. Most of the regular contributors were local expatriates living in the Gascony region.

== The end ==
The show ran for twenty-one weeks in the early months of 2011. When it ceased, Radio Coteaux's Sunday evening slot was filled by a new show called The Gascony Show, also hosted by John Slattery.
