= Radio Coteaux =

Community radio station in Saint Blancard, France

- Genre: community radio
- Country of origin: France
- Language(s): French & English
- Home station: Radio Coteaux
- Directed by: Thommy Martinez & Patrick Martinez
- Produced by: Patrick Martinez
- Recording studio: Radio Coteaux Studios, Saint-Blancard, Occitanie
- Original release: 1982
- Audio format: FM and Digital radio
- Website: Official website

Radio Coteaux is an associated local community radio station, embedded in the quaint French village Saint-Blancard in the Gers region, the heart of Gascony, in Occitanie (south of France), some 100 km south of Toulouse. Radio Coteaux is a French-language station, but also accommodates to the large number of expatriates that rank among its listeners through its Sunday evening English-language Gascony Show broadcast.

== Rock, Latino, Jazz, World ==
Radio Coteaux offers tremendous depth and breadth of programs with genres ranging from Rock, Latino, Jazz, World and many more.

== Community engagement ==
Radio Coteaux stays connected to its surrounding community by attending many events in the Gascony region, supporting numerous charitable causes, producing ecological programs on environment, and promoting tourism to the region through its close ties to CILT, le Centre d'Insertion par le Loisir et le Tourisme.

== Biker Street ==
A popular Biker Street program, hosted by biker fan and radio veteran César, is transmitted every Monday evening from 6:30pm to 8pm CET, and is replayed Thursdays at 5:30pm CET. With over 430 shows aired, Biker Street is one of the longest running music shows in the region.

== Welcoming foreigners ==
The arrival of a large number of ex-pats to the region in recent years has prompted Radio Coteaux to reach out to the newcomers with an all-English radio show called the Gascony Show, hosted by Irishman John Slattery. Through this show, Radio Coteaux aims to extend a warm welcome to all foreigners, while at the same time providing some light entertainment in English for the French listeners.

== Finance ==
The radio station has 2 permanent staff, anchor men Patrick and César. In addition, the station relies heavily on volunteers and support by sponsors and government grants. Financial donations are always welcomed by staff and volunteers at the station.
