= Gers's 2nd constituency =

Constituency of the National Assembly of France

2nd constituency of Gers
- inline Constituency of the National Assembly of France

- Location of constituency in Department

- Location of Gers in France
- Deputy: David Taupiac; PS
- Department: Gers
- Cantons: (pre-2015) Cazaubon, Cazaubon, Cologne, Condom, Eauze, Fleurance, Gimont, L'Isle-Jourdain, Jegun, Lectoure, Mauvezin, Miradoux, Montréal, Saint-Clar, Valence-sur-Baïse, Vic-Fezensac
- Registered voters: 82,077

The 2nd constituency of Gers is a French legislative constituency in the Gers département.

== Deputies ==
Election	Member	Party
1988	Jean-Pierre Joseph	PS
1993	Aymeri de Montesquiou	PRV
1997	Yvon Montané	PS
2002	Gérard Dubrac	UMP
2007	Gisèle Biémouret	PS
2012	Gisèle Biémouret	PS
2017	Gisèle Biémouret	PS
2022	David Taupiac	PS
2024	David Taupiac	PS

== Election results ==
=== 2024 ===
Candidate	Party	Alliance	First round			Second round		
Candidate	Party	Alliance	Votes	%	+/–	Votes	%	+/–
David Taupiac	PS	NFP	24,185	45.80	+21.65	30,912	59.37	-3.61
Alice Cendré	RN		18,739	35.49	+18.33	21,154	40.63	new
Barbara Neto	LR	UDC	7,416	14.04	+2.05			
Jean-Luc Davezac	REG		1,293	2.45	new			
Martine Arnaudy	REC		679	1.29	-3.21			
Michèle Martin	LO		481	0.91	+0.52			
Abla Lazorat	DIV		13	0.02	new			
Votes			52,806	100.00		52,066	100.00	
Valid votes			52,806	97.21	-0.25	52,066	95.65	+4.94
Blank votes			1,082	1.99	+0.23	1,673	3.07	-3.05
Null votes			436	0.80	+0.03	697	1.28	-1.88
Turnout			54,324	73.76	+17.28	54,436	73.91	+21.28
Abstentions			19,322	26.24	-17.28	19,217	26.09	-21.28
Registered voters			73,646			73,653		
Result			PS GAIN					

=== 2022 ===
Legislative Election 2022: Gers's 2nd constituency
Party	Candidate	Votes	%	±%
PS	David Taupiac*	9,816	24.15	N/A
LREM (Ensemble)	Maëva Bourcier	7,889	19.41	-4.95
LFI (NUPÉS)	Françoise Dubos	7,124	17.53	−15.52
RN	Alice Cendre	6,976	17.16	+5.06
LR (UDC)	Michel Gabas	4,874	11.99	+1.83
REC	Eric Monteil	1,830	4.50	N/A
Others	N/A	2,140	5.26	
Turnout		40,649	56.48	−0.25
2nd round result
PS	David Taupiac*	22,208	62.98	+11.41
LREM (Ensemble)	Maëva Bourcier	13,052	37.02	−11.41
Turnout		35,255	52.63	+2.39
PS hold				

* PS dissident

=== 2017 ===
Candidate	Label	First round		Second round	
Candidate	Label	Votes	%	Votes	%
Christopher Soccio	REM	9,584	24.36	15,001	48.43
Gisèle Biémouret	PS	7,057	17.94	15,972	51.57
Thomas Guasch	FN	4,759	12.10		
Michel Gabas	DVD	4,620	11.74		
Barbara Neto	LR	3,998	10.16		
Myriam Rimbert	FI	3,830	9.73		
Jean-Luc Davezac	DVG	2,050	5.21		
Jean-Paul Dugoujon	ECO	1,139	2.89		
Bruno Gabriel	PCF	980	2.49		
Bruno Dienot	DLF	260	0.66		
Michèle Martin	EXG	234	0.59		
Suzanne Vivant	DIV	221	0.56		
Cédric Davant	DIV	217	0.55		
Franck Walter	DVG	209	0.53		
Jérémy Collot	DIV	105	0.27		
Jacqueline Deneuve	DVD	82	0.21		
Votes		39,345	100.00	30,973	100.00
Valid votes		39,345	97.01	30,973	86.22
Blank votes		836	2.06	3,289	9.16
Null votes		378	0.93	1,661	4.62
Turnout		40,559	56.73	35,923	50.24
Abstentions		30,936	43.27	35,579	49.76
Registered voters		71,495		71,502	
Source: Ministry of the Interior

=== 2012 ===
2012 legislative election in Gers's 2nd constituency
Candidate	Party	First round		Second round	
Candidate	Party	Votes	%	Votes	%
Gisèle Biémouret	PS	19,026	42.57%	24,937	59.38%
Gérard Dubrac	UMP	9,311	20.83%	17,060	40.62%
Michel Gabas	PR	5,824	13.03%		
Thierry Umber	FN	4,713	10.55%		
Bruno Gabriel	FG	2,545	5.69%		
Françoise Dubos	EELV	1,606	3.59%		
France Joubert	MoDem	645	1.44%		
Bruno Dienot	DLR	531	1.19%		
Gaël Schultz		313	0.70%		
Anne Bourguignon	LO	180	0.40%		
Valid votes		44,694	97.97%	41,997	95.56%
Spoilt and null votes		925	2.03%	1,952	4.44%
Votes cast / turnout		45,619	65.02%	43,949	62.49%
Abstentions		24,542	34.98%	26,381	37.51%
Registered voters		70,161	100.00%	70,330	100.00%

=== 2007 ===
Legislative Election 2007: Gers 2nd - 2nd round
Party	Candidate	Votes	%	±%
PS	Gisèle Biémouret	23,232	50.59	
UMP	Gérard Dubrac	22,690	49.41	
Turnout		47,703	69.61	
PS hold		Swing		
