= Arrondissements of the Gers department =

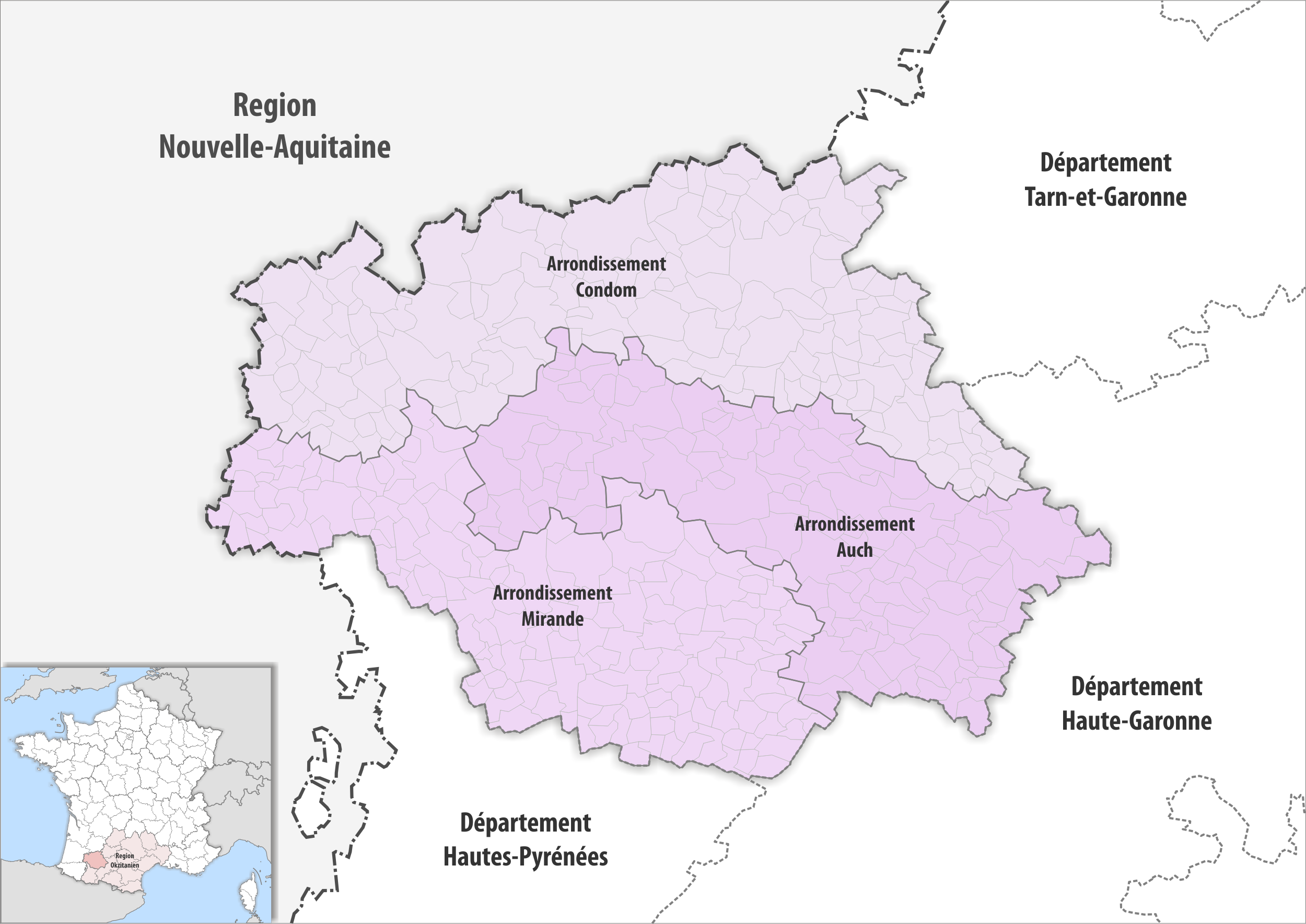
Map of arrondissements of the Gers department.

The 3 arrondissements of the Gers department are:

1. Arrondissement of Auch, (prefecture of the Gers department: Auch) with 134 communes. The population of the arrondissement was 84,027 in 2021.
2. Arrondissement of Condom, (subprefecture: Condom) with 162 communes. The population of the arrondissement was 67,094 in 2021.
3. Arrondissement of Mirande, (subprefecture: Mirande) with 165 communes. The population of the arrondissement was 41,316 in 2021.

== History ==
In 1800 the arrondissements of Auch, Condom, Lectoure, Lombez and Mirande were established. The arrondissements of Lectoure and Lombez were disbanded in 1926.

The borders of the arrondissements of Gers were modified in January 2017:

- 13 communes from the arrondissement of Auch to the arrondissement of Condom
- 21 communes from the arrondissement of Auch to the arrondissement of Mirande
- nine communes from the arrondissement of Condom to the arrondissement of Auch
- five communes from the arrondissement of Mirande to the arrondissement of Auch
