= Bouzon-Gellenave =

- Commune
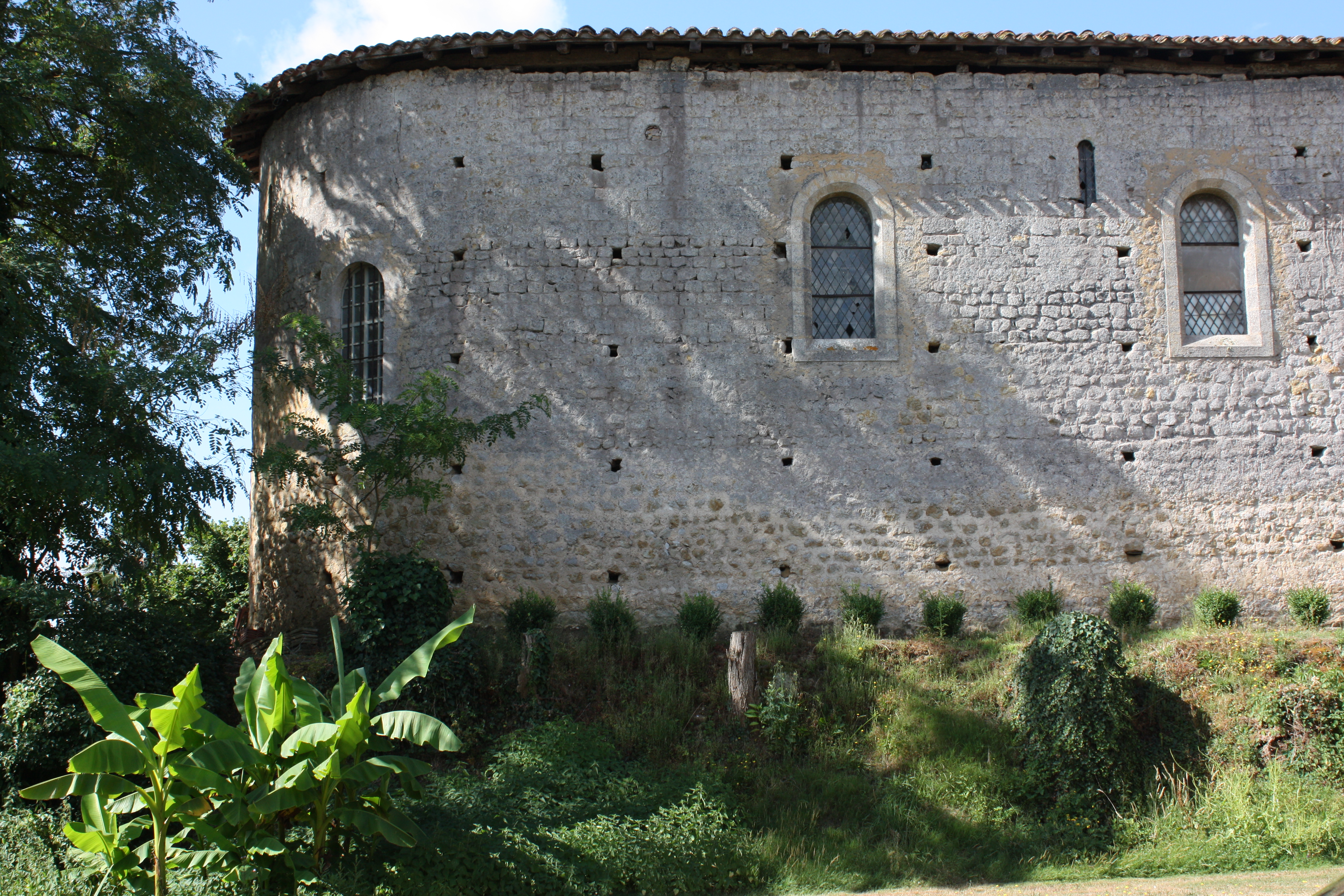
- The church in Bouzon-Gellenave
- Location of Bouzon-Gellenave
- Location within France Location within Occitanie
- Coordinates: 43°41′19″N 0°01′50″E
- Country: France
- Region: Occitania
- Department: Gers
- Arrondissement: Mirande
- Canton: Adour-Gersoise
- Intercommunality: Armagnac Adour

Government
  - Mayor (2020–2026): Nicole Duclos
- Area^{1}: 10.29 km^{2} (3.97 sq mi)
- Elevation: 150 m (490 ft)
- Highest elevation: 200 m (660 ft)
- Lowest elevation: 101 m (331 ft)
- Population (2023): 159
  - Density: 15.5/km^{2} (40.0/sq mi)
- Time zone: UTC+01:00 (CET)
  - Summer (DST): UTC+02:00 (CEST)
- INSEE/Postal code: 32063 /32290
- ^{1} French Land Register data, which excludes lakes, ponds, glaciers > 1 km^{2} (0.386 sq mi or 247 acres) and river estuaries.

Bouzon-Gellenave (French pronunciation: [buzɔ̃ ʒɛlnav]; Occitan: Boson e Gelanava) is a commune in the Gers department in southwestern France.

== Geography ==
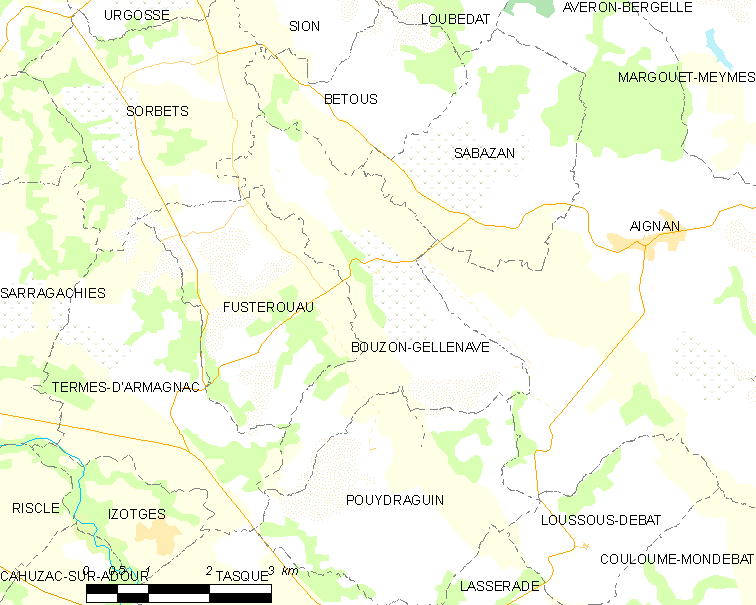
Bouzon-Gellenave and its surrounding communes

== Population ==
Historical population
| Year | Pop. | ±% p.a. |
|---|---|---|
| 1968 | 190 | — |
| 1975 | 175 | −1.17% |
| 1982 | 181 | +0.48% |
| 1990 | 176 | −0.35% |
| 1999 | 167 | −0.58% |
| 2007 | 188 | +1.49% |
| 2012 | 194 | +0.63% |
| 2017 | 193 | −0.10% |
| 2023 | 159 | −3.18% |
Source: INSEE

== See also ==
- Communes of the Gers department
