= Cantons of the Gers department =

The following is a list of the 17 cantons of the Gers department, in France, following the French canton reorganisation which came into effect in March 2015:

- Adour-Gersoise
- Armagnac-Ténarèze
- Astarac-Gimone
- Auch-1
- Auch-2
- Auch-3
- Baïse-Armagnac
- Fezensac
- Fleurance-Lomagne
- Gascogne-Auscitaine
- Gimone-Arrats
- Grand-Bas-Armagnac
- L'Isle-Jourdain
- Lectoure-Lomagne
- Mirande-Astarac
- Pardiac-Rivière-Basse
- Val de Save
