= Cape Flattery (disambiguation) =

Cape Flattery is the northwesternmost point of the contiguous United States, in Clallam County, Washington.

Cape Flattery may also refer to:

- Cape Flattery (Queensland), a cape in northern Queensland, Australia
- Cape Flattery (Ma and Pa Kettle), a fictional town in the Ma and Pa Kettle film series
- MS Cape Flattery (1940), a cargo ship
  - SS Cape Flattery (AK-5070), a similarly named cargo ship
