= Jean-René Cazeneuve =

French politician (born 1958)

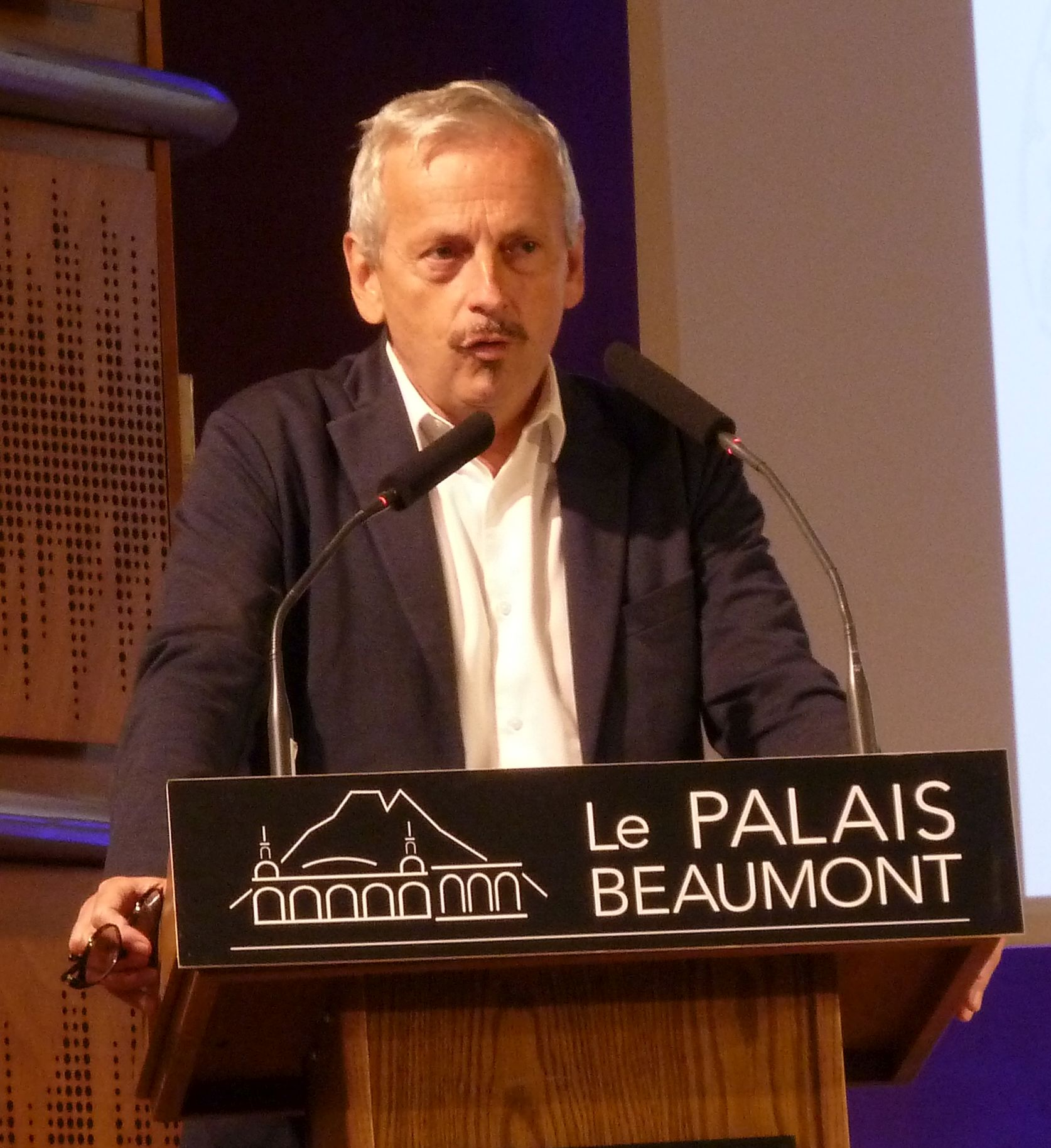

Member of the National Assembly for Gers's 1st constituency
- Incumbent
- Assumed office 21 June 2017
- Preceded by: Philippe Martin

Personal details
- Born: 9 June 1958 (age 68) Paris, France
- Party: Renaissance
- Children: Marguerite; Pierre
- Education: École Centrale de Marseille; HEC Paris (MBA)

Jean-René Cazeneuve (born 9 June 1958) is a French politician of Renaissance (RE) who has been serving as a member of the French National Assembly since 18 June 2017, representing the department of Gers.

== Early career ==
From 2001 to 2004, Cazeneuve was the managing director of Apple Inc. for France, Central Europe, Middle East and Africa.

He graduated from Centrale Méditerranée and HEC Paris.

== Political career ==
Cazeneuve first became a member of the National Assembly in the 2017 elections. In parliament, he has since been serving on the Committee on Finance. Since 2022, he has been serving as the Parliament's lead rapporteur on the annual budget of France. He is chairman of the supervisory board (Commission de surveillance) of the Caisse des dépôts et consignations since November 2024.

== See also ==
- 2017 French legislative election
