= Claude Desbons =

French politician

Claude Desbons (7 October 1938 – 24 September 2001) was a French politician.

Desbons was born in Loussous-Débat and later moved to Auch, where he served as deputy mayor from 1977 to 1995. Between 1987 and 1997, Desbons was also a member of the Gers General Council, as a representative of Auch. Two years after his election as mayor of Auch in 1995, Desbons, succeeded Yves Rispat as a member of the National Assembly. Desbons held both the mayoralty of Auch and his position as representative of Gers until his death. Over the course of his political career, Desbons was a member of the Radical Party of the Left and later the Socialist Party.

On 23 December 2000, Desbons fell into a coma caused by a stroke, and died on 24 September 2001 in Saint-Blancard, at the age of 62.
