= David Taupiac =

French politician

- Appointed by: June 22, 2022
- Preceded by: Gisèle Biémouret
- Constituency: Gers's 2nd constituency

Personal details
- Born: 13 May 1975 (age 51) Montauban, France
- Party: PS
- Occupation: Politician, aeronautical consultant

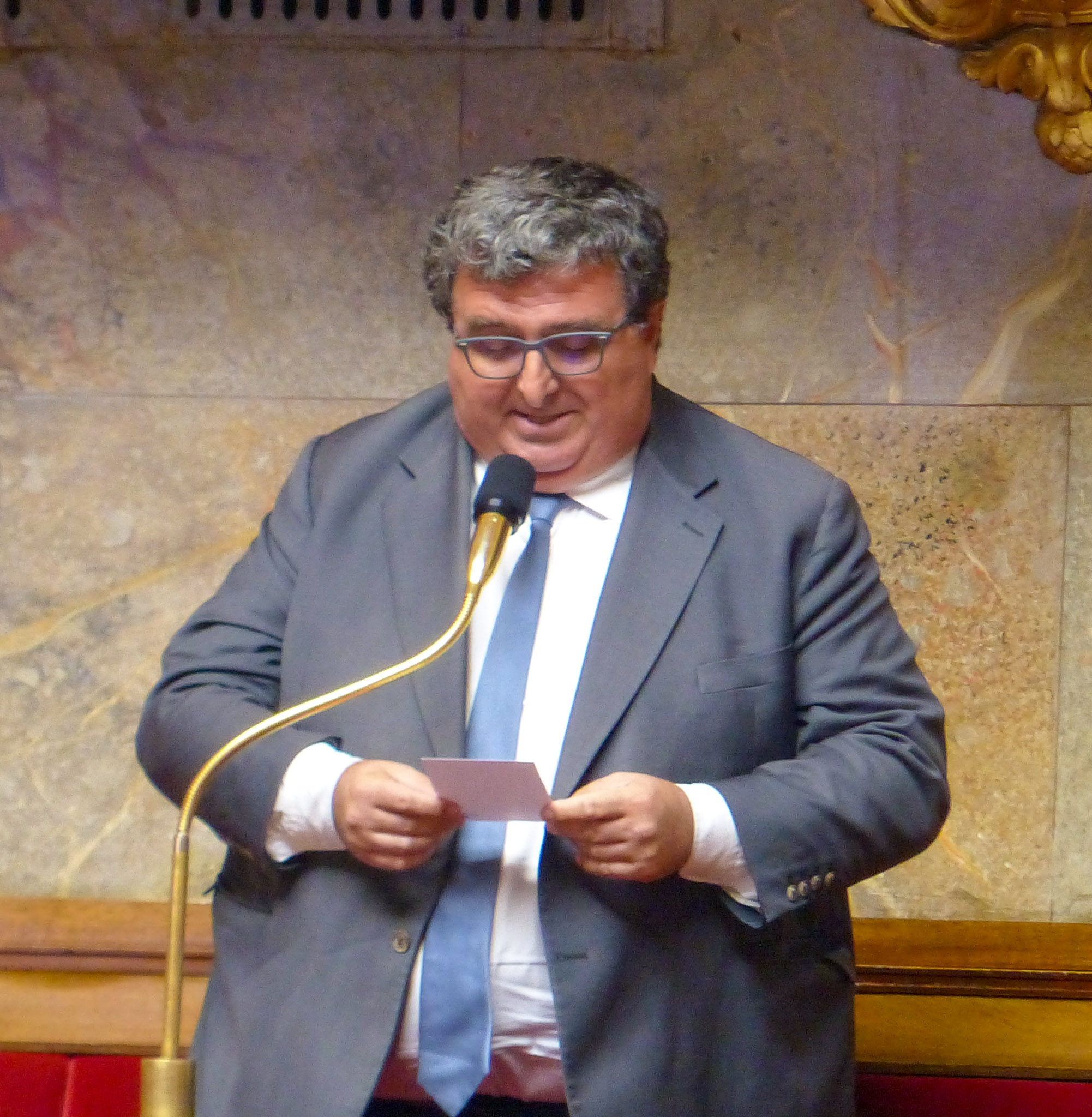
David Taupiac, 2025

David Taupiac (French pronunciation: [david topjak]; born 13 May 1975) is a French politician. He was elected deputy for the second constituency of Gers in 2022 and regional councillor for Occitanie in 2021.

== Biography ==
=== Early life and education ===
David Taupiac studied aeronautical design engineering at Toulouse-III-Paul-Sabatier University, from 1995 to 1998.

An aeronautical engineer by profession, he obtained permission from the ethics officer of the French National Assembly to continue working as a consultant in the sector after his election, on condition that he did not work for companies eligible for state aid or contracts.

=== Political career ===
David Taupiac was mayor of Saint-Clar from 2008 to 2022 and regional councillor for the Occitanie region from 2021.

In the 2022 legislative elections, he distanced himself from the NUPES agreement, underlining fundamental disagreements with LFI. He was elected deputy for the second Gers constituency on June 19, 2022, as a dissident Socialist Party candidate, with 62.98% of the vote against his rival Maëva Bourcier from La République en marche. In September 2022, he joined the LIOT group.

He intervened in particular to oppose the proposed law banning private jet flights, highlighting the minimal impact of private jet flights on overall greenhouse gas emissions. According to Le Monde, this opposition to the ban on private jet flights could constitute a conflict of interest, as David Taupiac will be working until 2029 for a company specializing in private jet flights.
