= Saint-Blancard =

- Part of Cap d'Astarac
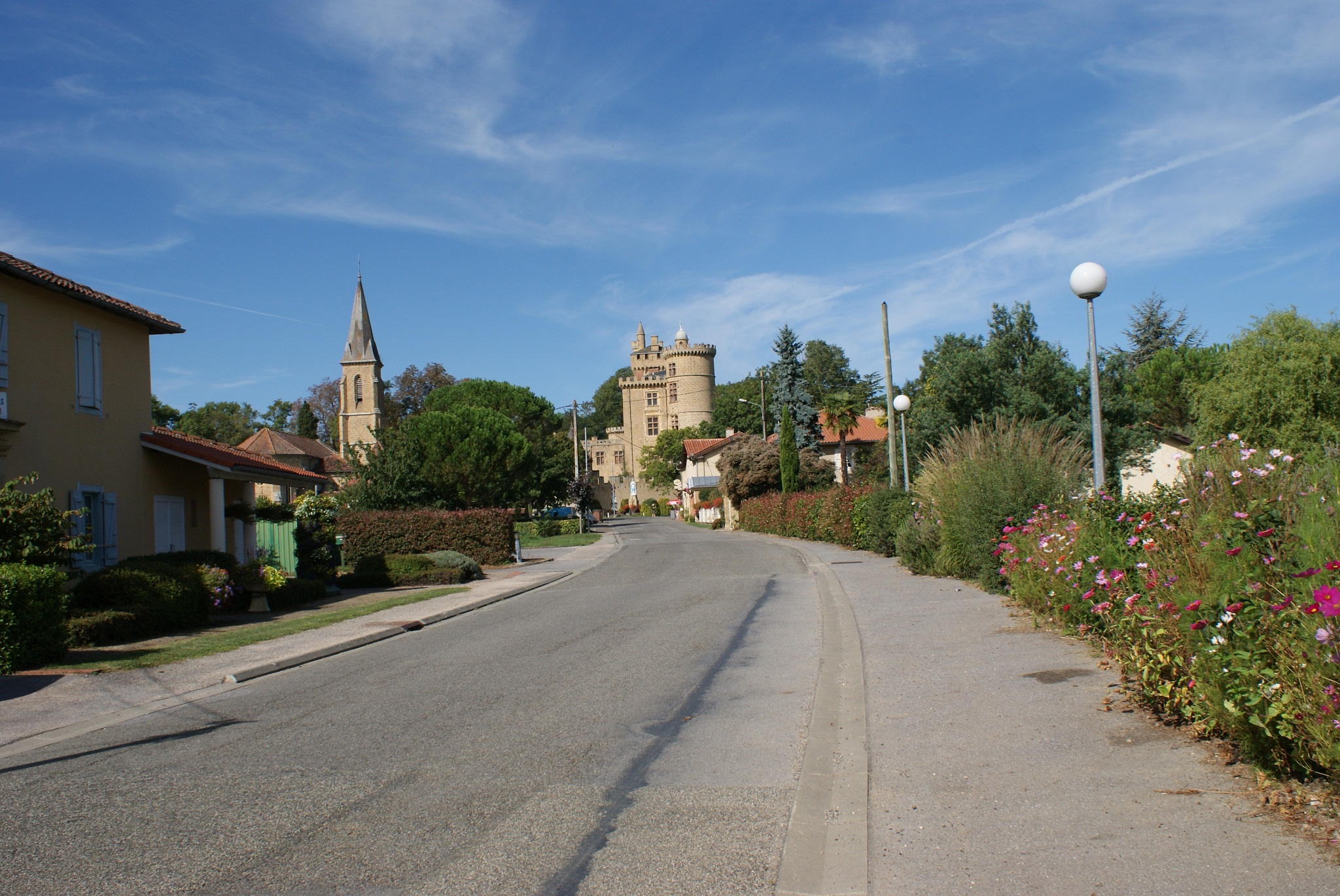
- The main road in the village
- Location of Saint-Blancard
- Location within France Location within Occitanie
- Coordinates: 43°20′42″N 0°38′51″E
- Country: France
- Region: Occitania
- Department: Gers
- Arrondissement: Mirande
- Canton: Astarac-Gimone
- Commune: Cap d'Astarac
- Area^{1}: 14.87 km^{2} (5.74 sq mi)
- Elevation: 356 m (1,168 ft)
- Highest elevation: 357 m (1,171 ft)
- Lowest elevation: 227 m (745 ft)
- Population (2023): 256
  - Density: 17.2/km^{2} (44.6/sq mi)
- Time zone: UTC+01:00 (CET)
  - Summer (DST): UTC+02:00 (CEST)
- Postal code: 32140
- ^{1} French Land Register data, which excludes lakes, ponds, glaciers > 1 km^{2} (0.386 sq mi or 247 acres) and river estuaries.

Saint-Blancard (French pronunciation: [sɛ̃ blɑ̃kaʁ]; Gascon: Sent Blancat) is a former commune in the Gers department in the Occitanie region in southwestern France. It was merged into the new commune Cap d'Astarac on 1 January 2025. The inhabitants are called Saint Blancardais in French.

== Geography ==
=== Localisation ===
Saint-Blancard is located on the ridge between the valley of the Gimone in the east and the valley of the Arrats in the west . The D228 crosses the D576 in the village. Auch is at 40 km, Toulouse at 80 km and Tarbes at 60 km from Saint-Blancard.

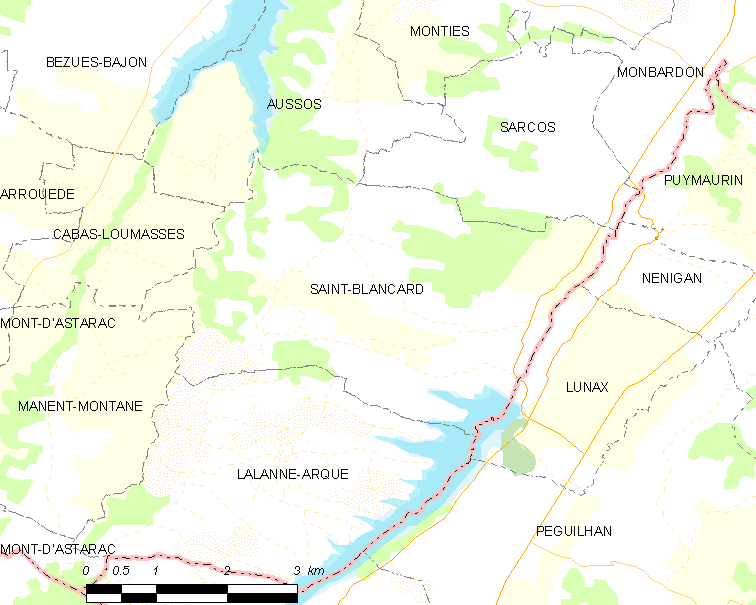
Saint-Blancard and its surrounding communes

== Hydrography ==
The Arrats runs in the west of the commune.

South of the village is a small lake for the farmers.

There is a privately owned watermill. To the southeast lies a 6 km long reservoir with a surface area of 263 hectares, Lac de la Gimone. The lake forms the border between Gers and Haute-Garonne. It was created by the placement of a dam on the river Gimone. The commune has a system of streams and small lakes that serve the agriculture.

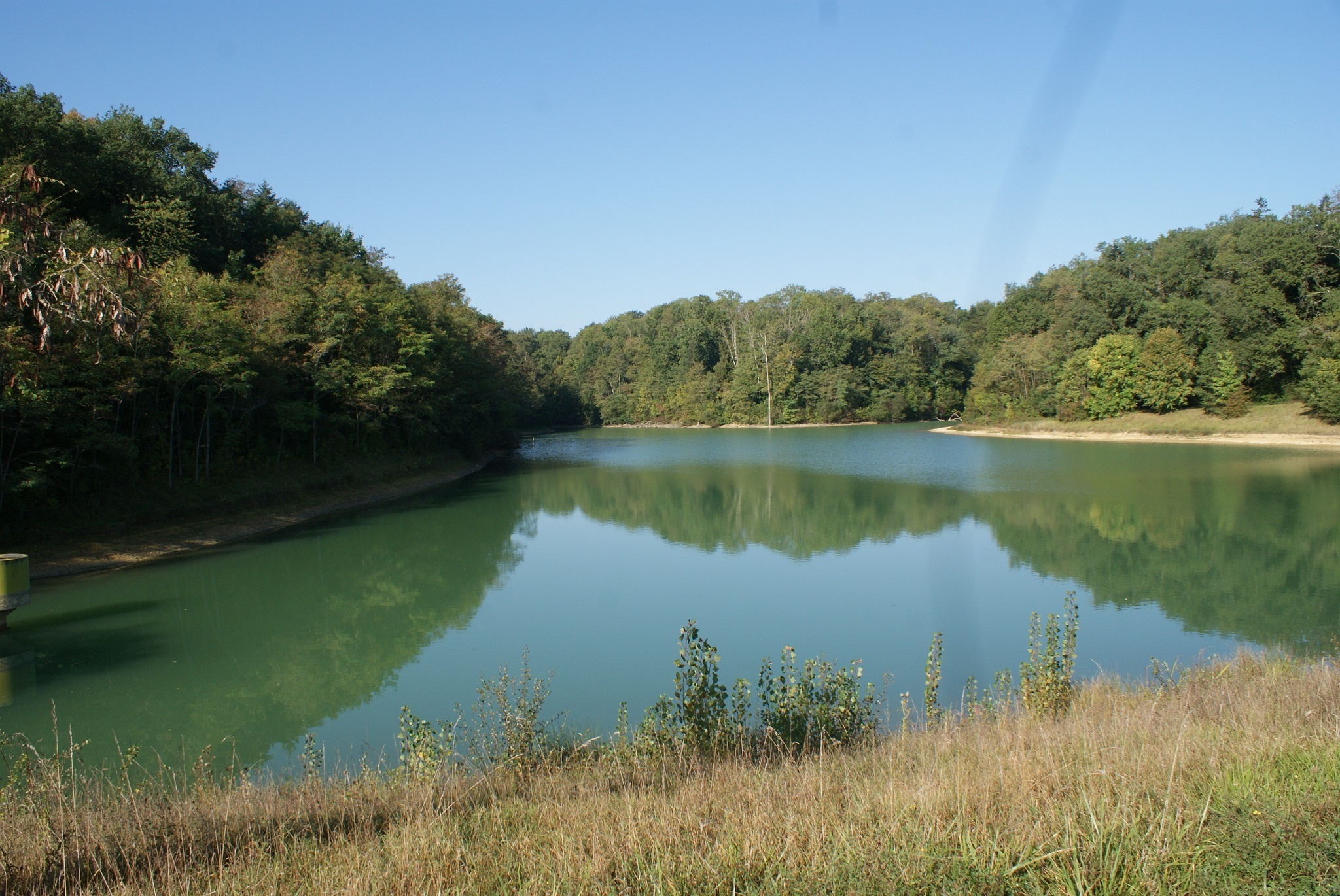
Small lake near the village.

=== Services ===
With a small shop, the village is still self-supporting. At the store is a gas depot. There is a hairdresser and a post office in Saint-Blancard. The municipality encourages the middle class by counting low rents for buildings. In a former convent school is now a hotel / pub / restaurant next to the town hall. There is a school. There are Bed & Breakfast and there are cottages. There is a football field. In the village is radio Coteaux, 97.7 and 104.5 FM located . At the lake is a nautical center. There is a swimming facility. There is a field for motorized paragliding.

The village has a rehabilitation center. There are also homes for rehabilitation treatment.

== Sites of interest ==
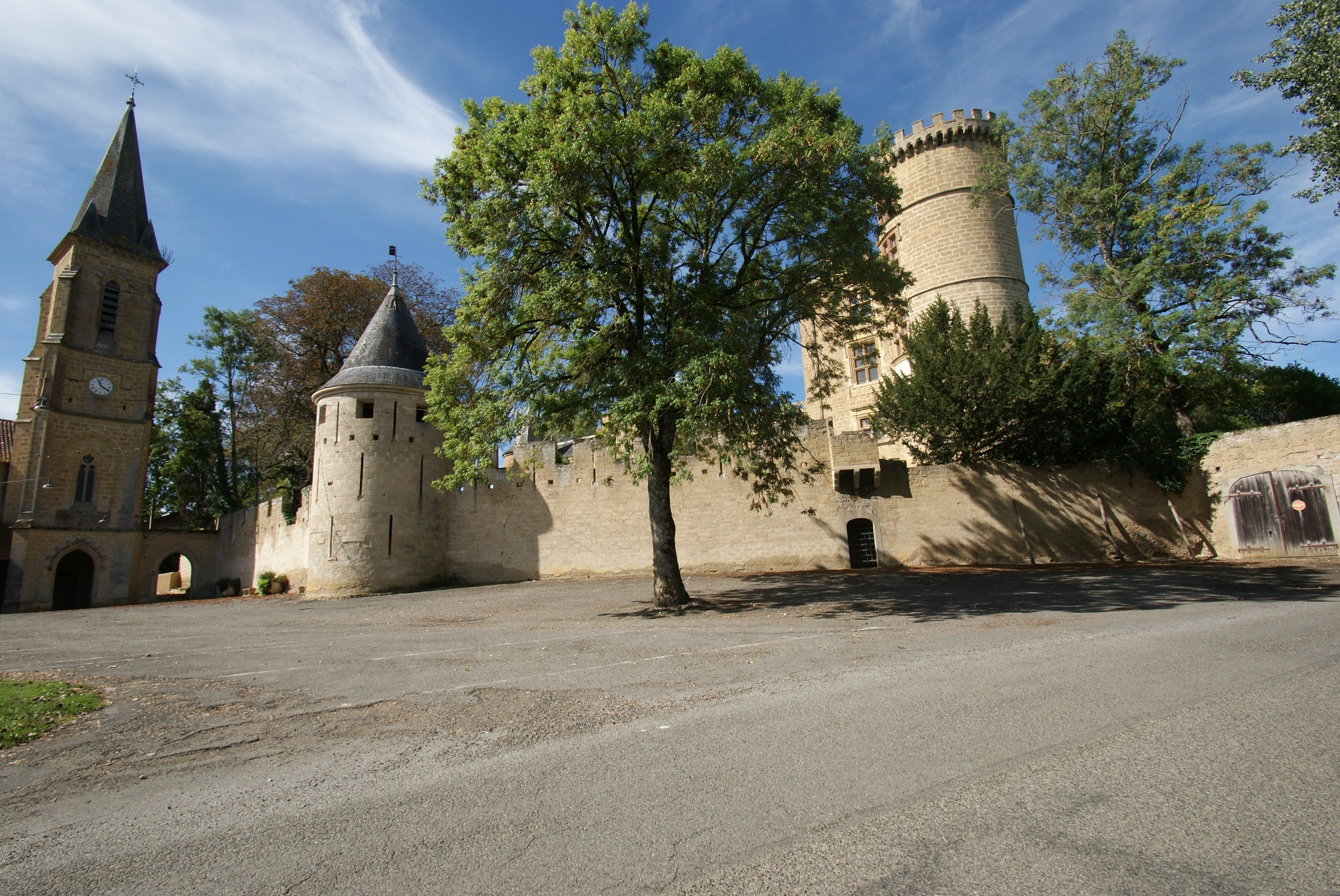
The church and the castle

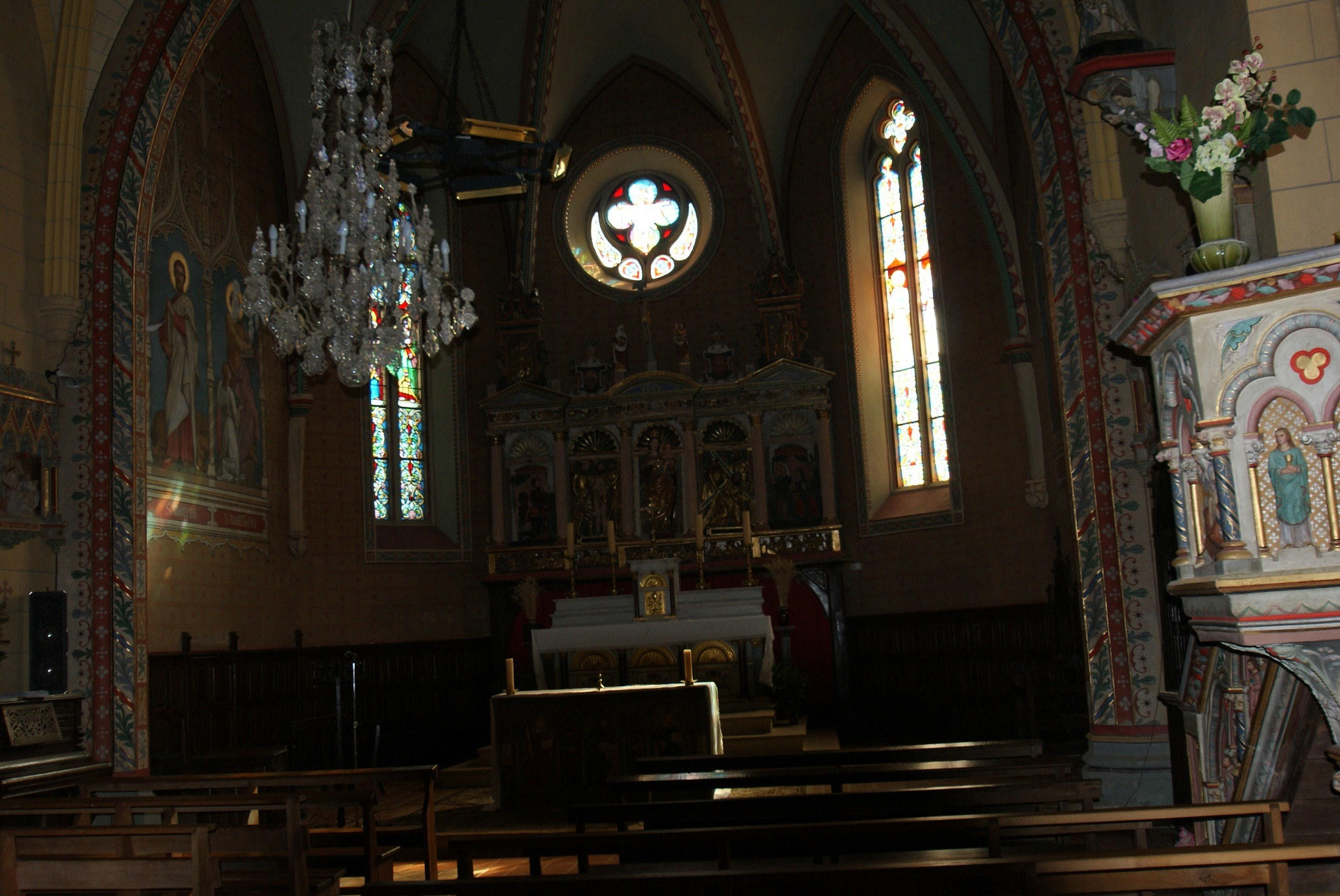
Inside the church.

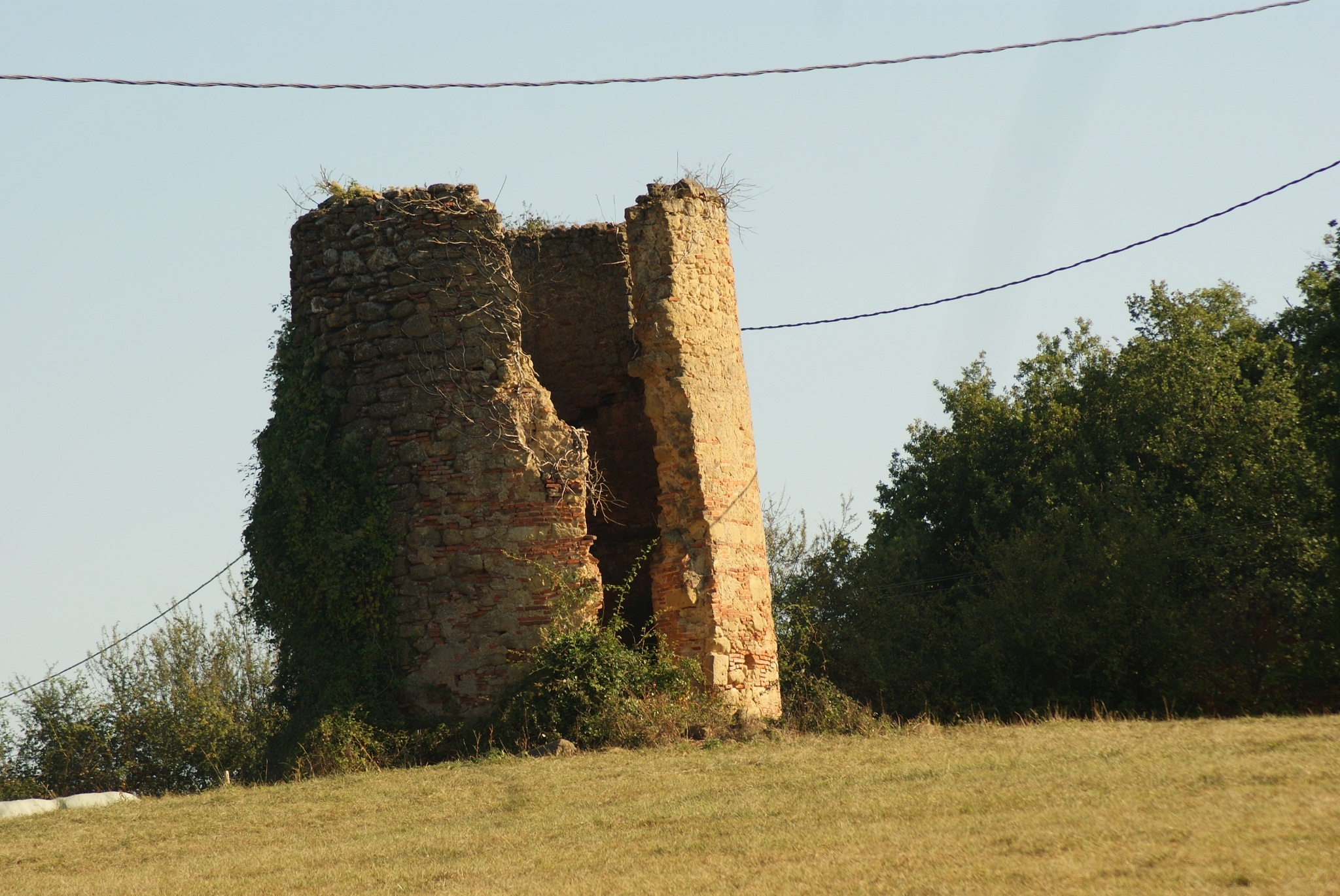
Remains of the windmill.

The most striking building in town is the castle. The 15th-century church Saint-Pancrare is built next to the castle. At the junktion west of the castle is a monument to a former Count Armand who was also mayor of the village. In a pasture north of the castle stand on a hill, the remains of the windmill (moulin à vent fr) from Saint-Blancard. That place is called Chez Baptiste. In front of the castle is a monument to the fallen, a cross and a statue of Mary. Between these statues is a boules alley with lights located.

In the middle of the village stands a cross aging from 1895 in memory of the famille (family) Furgatte. In the east of the village stands a twelve-foot-high wooden cross back from the seventeenth century.

== Notable people ==
In the village is the Château de Saint-Blancard (Castle of Saint-Blancard). Among the barons and marquesses that lived in the castle were:

- Bernard d'Ornezan, Baron of Saint-Blancard in the diocese of Lombez, around 1400,
- and Armand de Gontaut, baron de Biron and Maréchal de camp, mid sixteenth century.

== See also ==
- Communes of the Gers department
