= Yves Rispat =

French politician

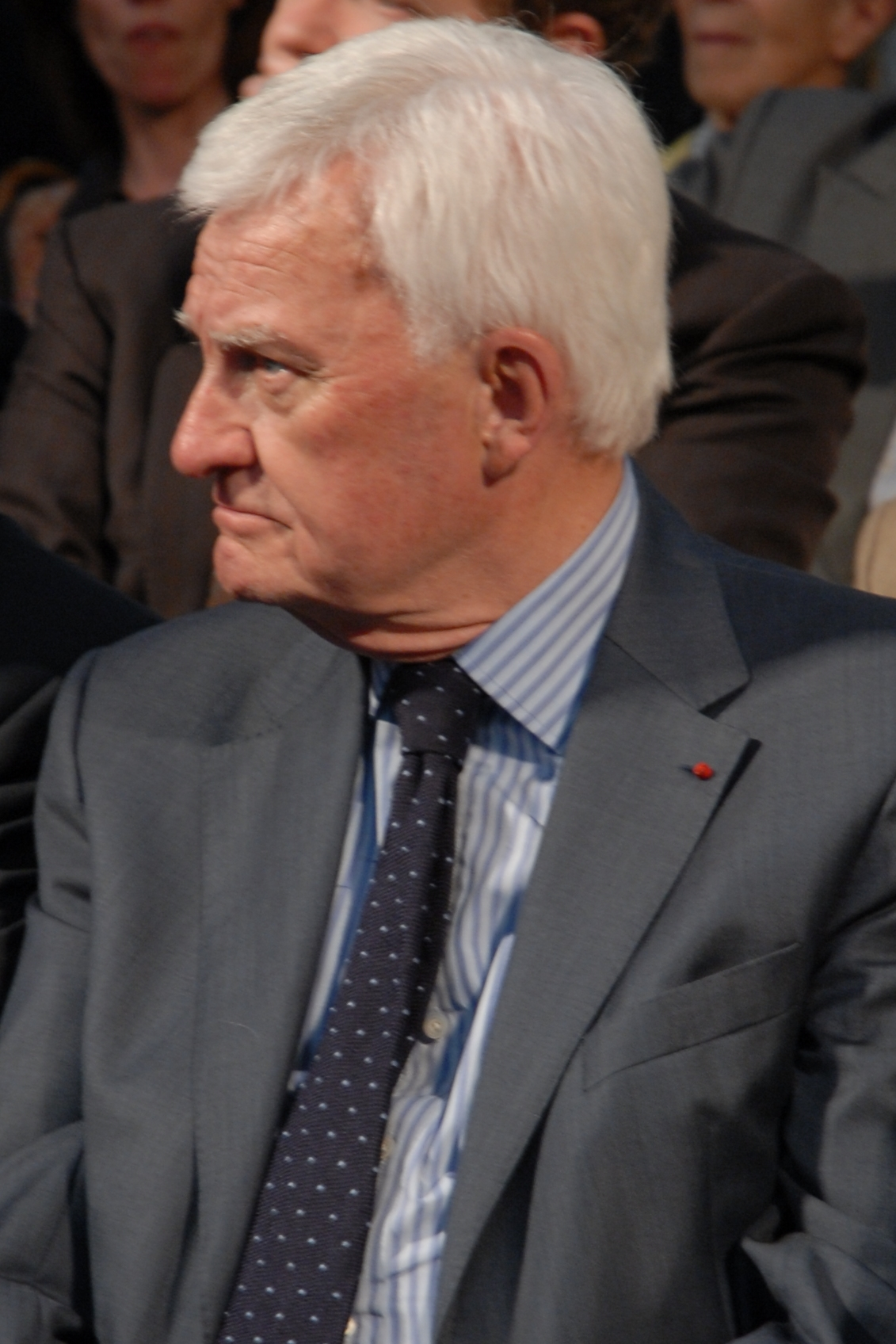
Yves Rispat

Yves Rispat (17 September 1931 –15 January 2015) was a French politician.

Rispat was born in Capdenac, and later moved to Lupiac, where he was first elected mayor in 1965. He was elected to the Gers General Council in 1988, representing Aignan until 2008. Rispat served the Rispat served on the National Assembly from 1993 to 1997. He left the Assembly for the Senate, and stepped down from the senate in 2008. In 2011, Rispat was convicted on charges of embezzlement dating back to his tenure as leader of an agricultural association in Gers. As a result of the ruling, Rispat's Légion d'honneur and National Order of Merit were rescinded in 2014. He did not stand for municipal reelection that year, and died on 15 January 2015 in Auch. Rispat's funeral was held two days after his death.
