= Gers =

Department of France

- Department of France
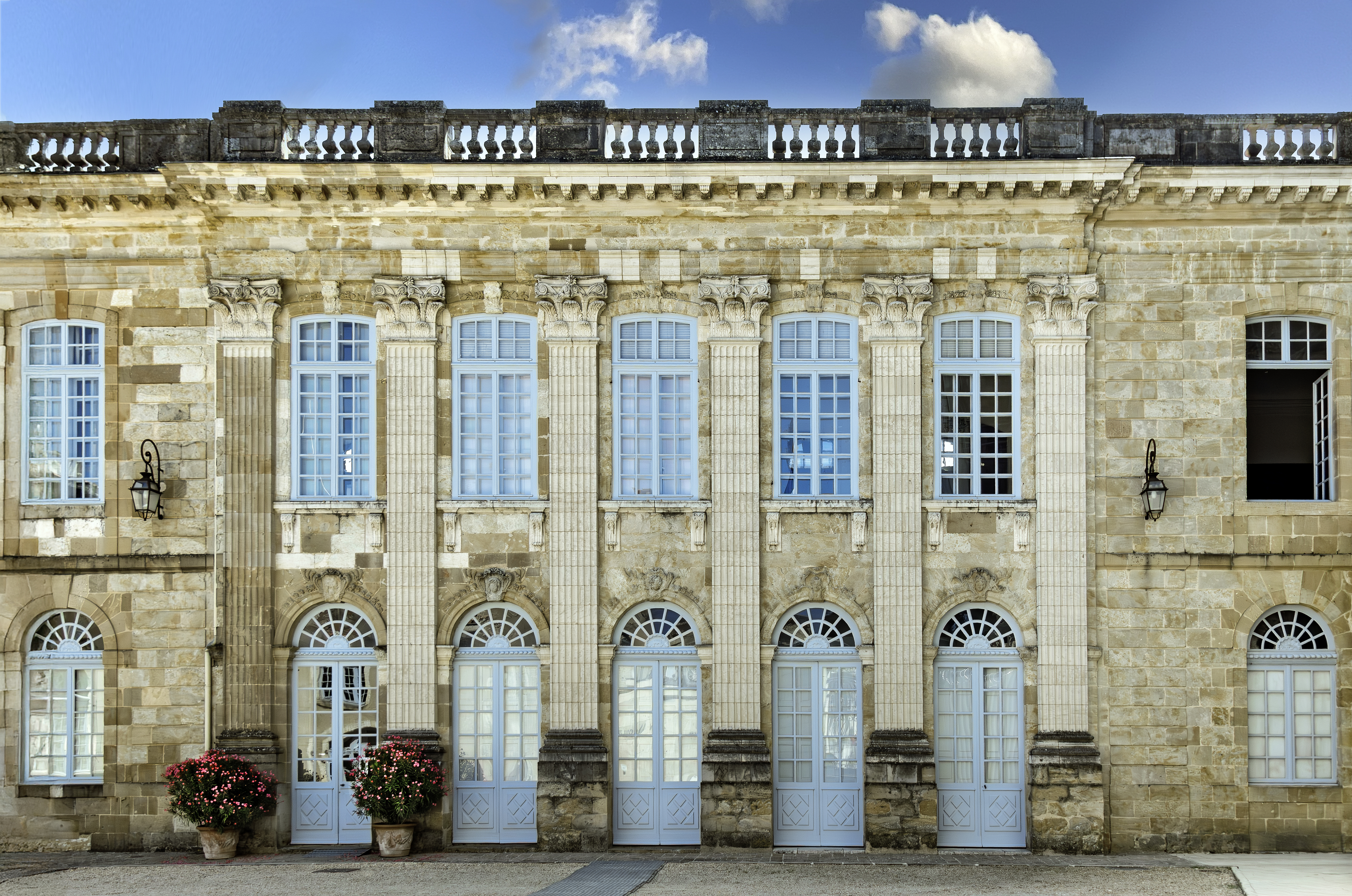
- Prefecture building in Auch

- Flag Coat of arms

- Location of Gers in France
- Coordinates: 43°39′N 0°35′E
- Country: France
- Region: Occitanie
- Prefecture: Auch
- Subprefectures: Condom; Mirande

Government
  - President of the Departmental Council: Philippe Dupouy (PS)

Area^{1}
  - Total: 6,257 km^{2} (2,416 sq mi)

Population (2023)
  - Total: 192,645
  - Rank: 90th
  - Density: 30.79/km^{2} (79.74/sq mi)
- Time zone: UTC+1 (CET)
  - Summer (DST): UTC+2 (CEST)
- Department number: 32
- Arrondissements: 3
- Cantons: 17
- Communes: 458
- ^1 French Land Register data, which exclude estuaries, and lakes, ponds, and glaciers larger than 1 km^{2}

The Gers (French pronunciation: [ʒɛʁ(s)]; Occitan: Gers or Gerç, [dʒɛɾs]) is a department in the region of Occitania, Southwestern France. The Gers is bordered by the departments of Hautes-Pyrénées and Pyrénées-Atlantiques to the south, Haute-Garonne and Tarn-et-Garonne to the east, Lot-et-Garonne to the north and Landes to the west. Named after the Gers River, its inhabitants are called the Gersois and Gersoises in French. In 2023, it had a population of 192,645.

== History ==
The Gers is one of the original 83 departments created during the French Revolution on 4 March 1790. It was created from parts of the former provinces of Guyenne and Gascony. In 1808 it lost Lavit on its north-eastern side to the newly created department of Tarn-et-Garonne.

== Culture ==
The culture is largely agricultural, with great emphasis on the local gastronomical specialties such as:

- Armagnac brandy;
- Côtes de Gascogne;
- Floc de Gascogne;
- Foie gras;
- Wild mushrooms.

Also, some prominent cultivated crops are maize, colza, sunflowers and grain.

The Gascon language is a dialect of Occitan, but it is not widely spoken. The department is characterised by sleepy bastide villages and rolling hills with the Pyrenees visible to the south. Alexandre Dumas, père created the famous Gersois d'Artagnan, the fourth musketeer of The Three Musketeers. A museum to d'Artagnan is found in the Gersois village of Lupiac.

A horse race at the Auteuil Hippodrome has been named after André Boingnères, a notable local race-horse owner and the successful Mayor of Termes-d'Armagnac between 1951 and 1976.

== Politics ==
=== Departmental Council of Gers ===
The President of the Departmental Council of the Gers has been Philippe Dupouy of the Socialist Party since 2022. He succeeded Philippe Martin, also from the Socialist Party, who had been in office since 2014. The assembly comprises 34 seats, allocated as follows since the 2015 departmental elections:

Party		Seats
•	Socialist Party	22
	The Republicans	12

=== Members of the National Assembly ===
The Gers elected the following members of the National Assembly during the 2017 legislative election:

Constituency	Member	Party
Gers's 1st constituency	Jean-René Cazeneuve	Renaissance
Gers's 2nd constituency	David Taupiac	Socialist Party

== Demography ==
Historical population

Year	Pop.	±% p.a.
1801	257,609	—
1806	287,021	+2.19%
1821	301,336	+0.32%
1831	312,160	+0.35%
1841	311,447	−0.02%
1851	307,479	−0.13%
1861	298,931	−0.28%
1872	284,717	−0.44%
1881	281,532	−0.12%
1891	261,084	−0.75%
1901	238,448	−0.90%
1911	221,994	−0.71%
1921	194,406	−1.32%
1931	193,134	−0.07%

Year	Pop.	±% p.a.
1936	192,451	−0.07%
1946	190,431	−0.11%
1954	185,111	−0.35%
1962	182,264	−0.19%
1968	181,577	−0.06%
1975	175,366	−0.50%
1982	174,154	−0.10%
1990	174,587	+0.03%
1999	172,335	−0.14%
2007	183,615	+0.80%
2012	189,530	+0.64%
2017	191,091	+0.16%
2023	192,645	+0.14%

Located in Southwestern France, the Gers is amongst the least densely populated (31 people/km^{2} in 2023), least urban, or most rural, areas in all of Western Europe. As of 2023, there are 9 communes with more than 3,000 inhabitants:

Commune	Population (2023)
Auch	22,428
L'Isle-Jourdain	9,537
Condom	6,473
Fleurance	6,247
Eauze	4,108
Lectoure	3,670
Vic-Fezensac	3,577
Mirande	3,457
Gimont	3,146

== Climate ==
Annual rainfall varies from more than 900 mm in the south-west of the department, to less than 700 mm in the North-East (Auch, Condom, Lectoure).

Winters are overall mild, with only occasional freezing temperatures. Summers are hot and dry. Together with Toulouse, Nîmes, Carpentras, Ajaccio, Marseille, Toulon and Perpignan, Auch is one of the hottest cities in France.

== Tourism ==
According to recent data tourism represents annually:

- 610,000 tourists,
- 5,900,000 nights,
- 22,100 commercial beds,
- 2,400 tourism-related jobs,
- Tourists account for an equivalent of 17,100 permanent inhabitants,
- their estimated expenditure is €141,000,000.
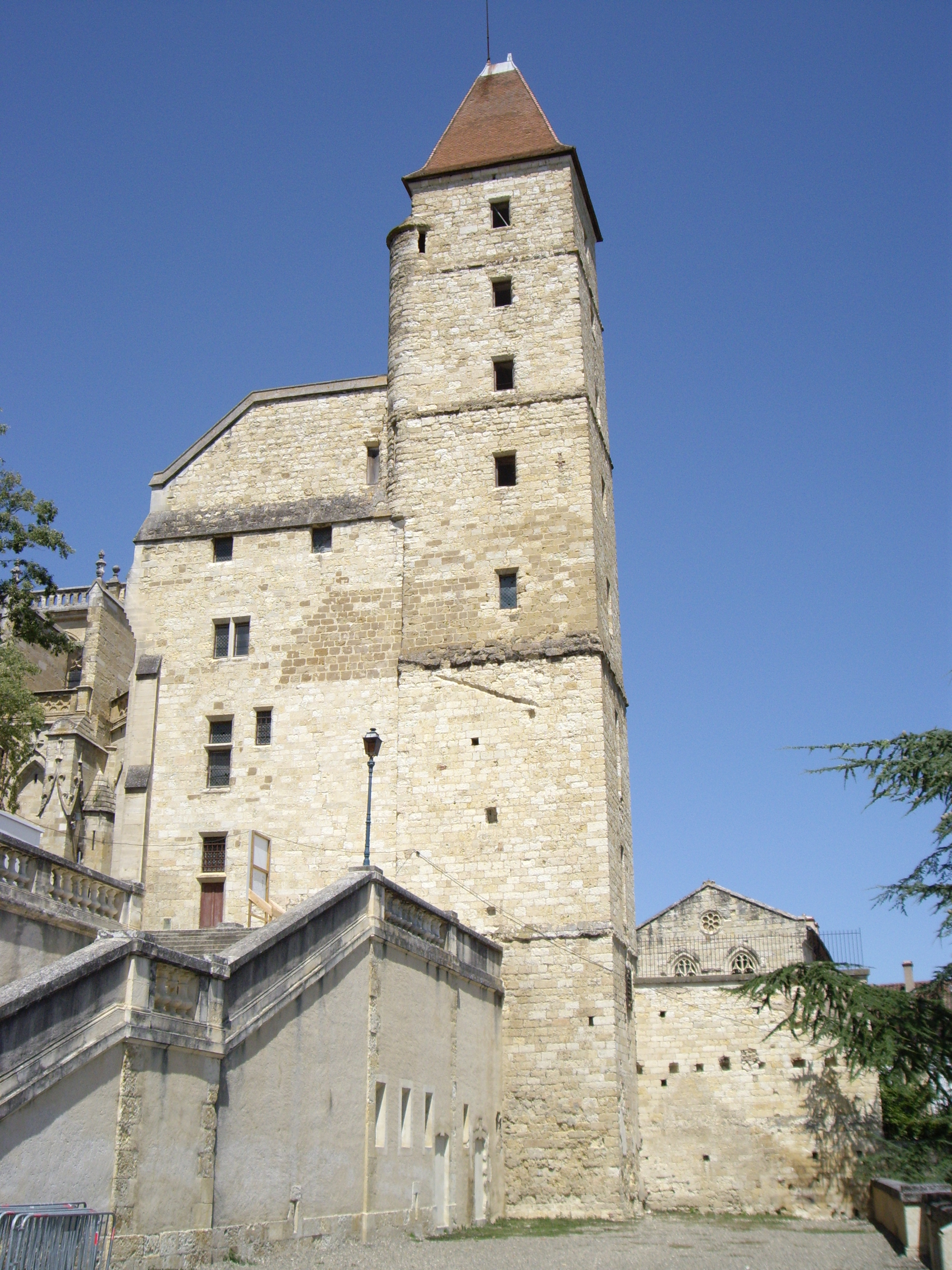
Auch

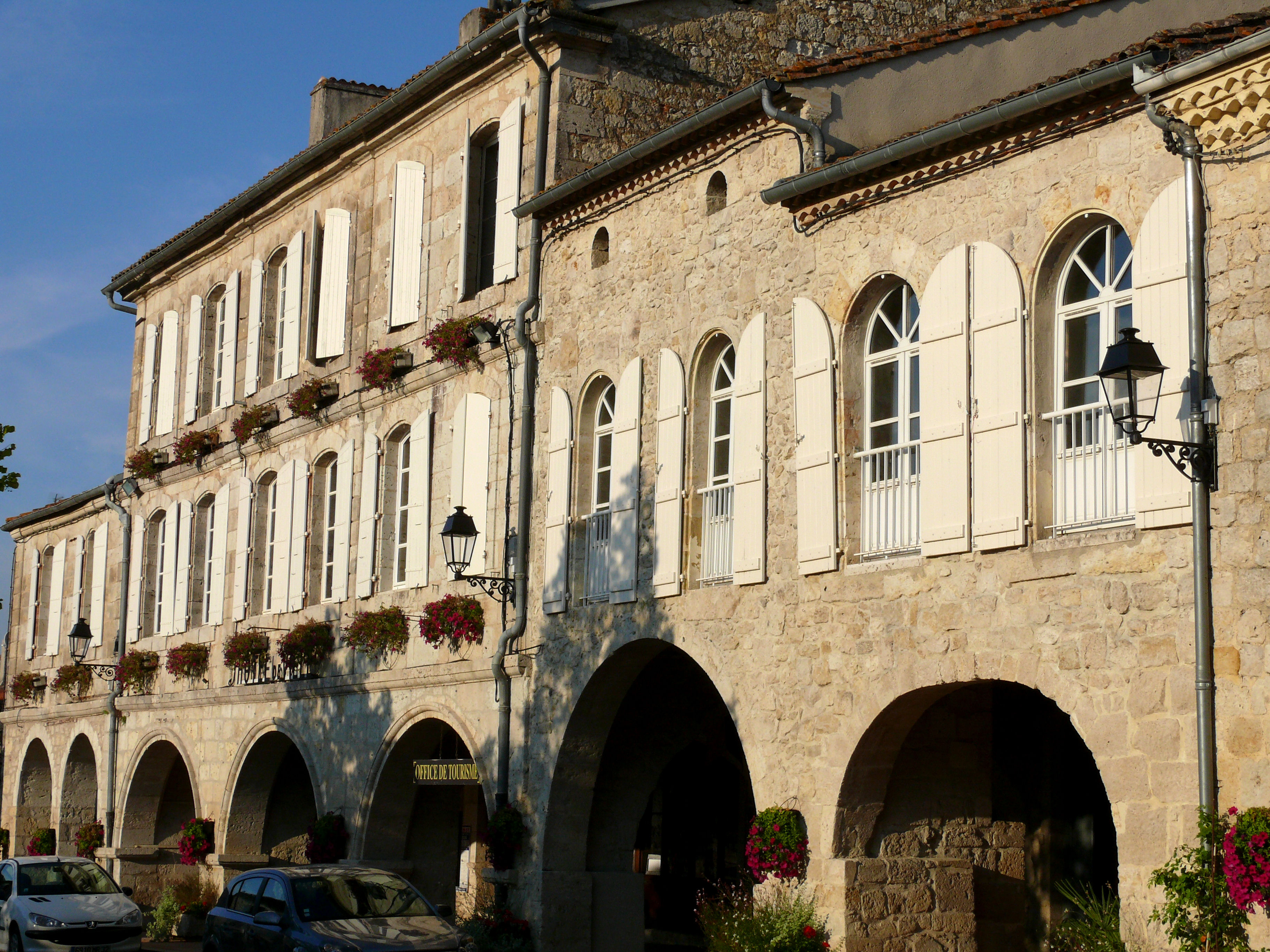
Montréal, Gers

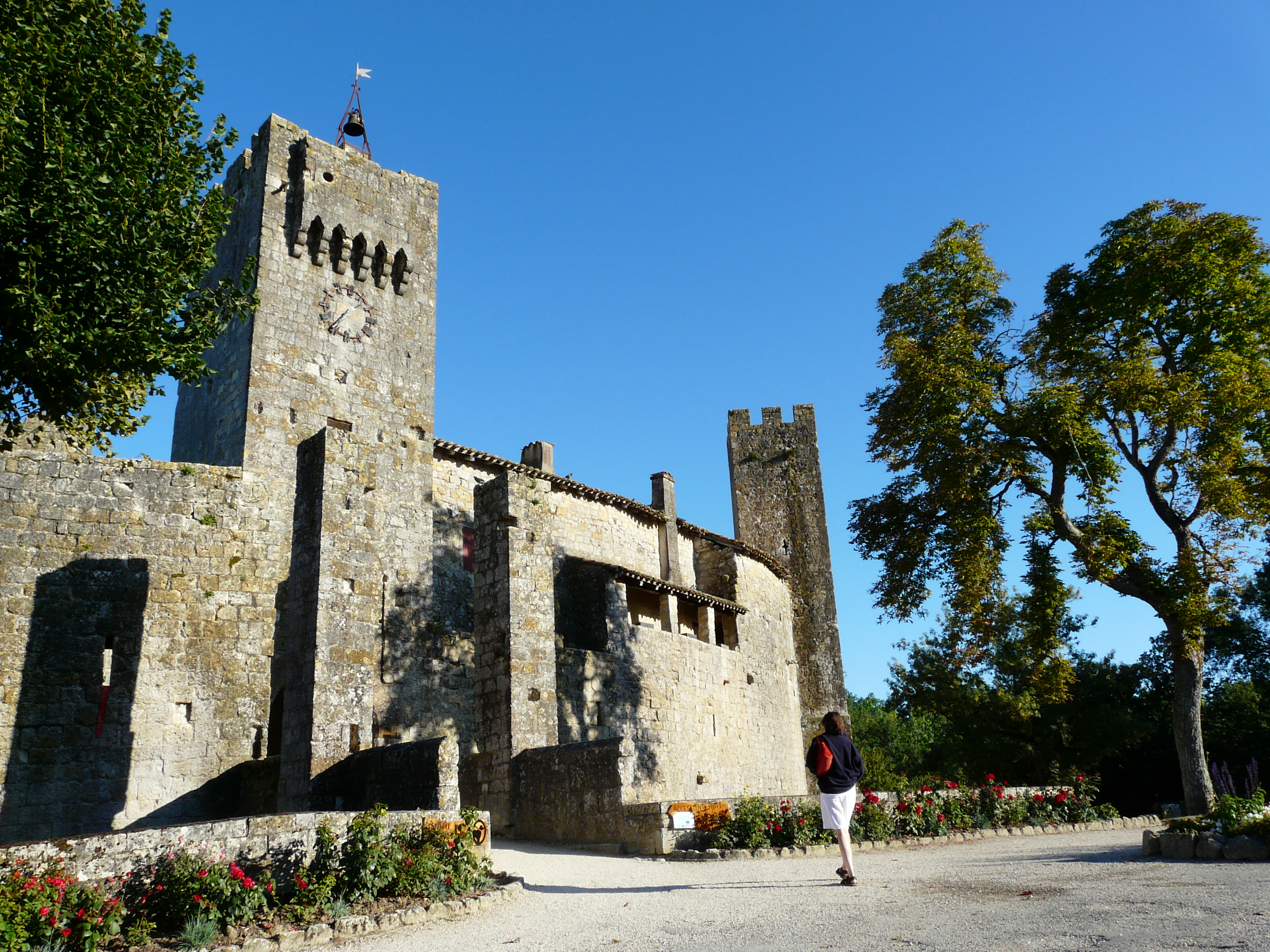
Larressingle

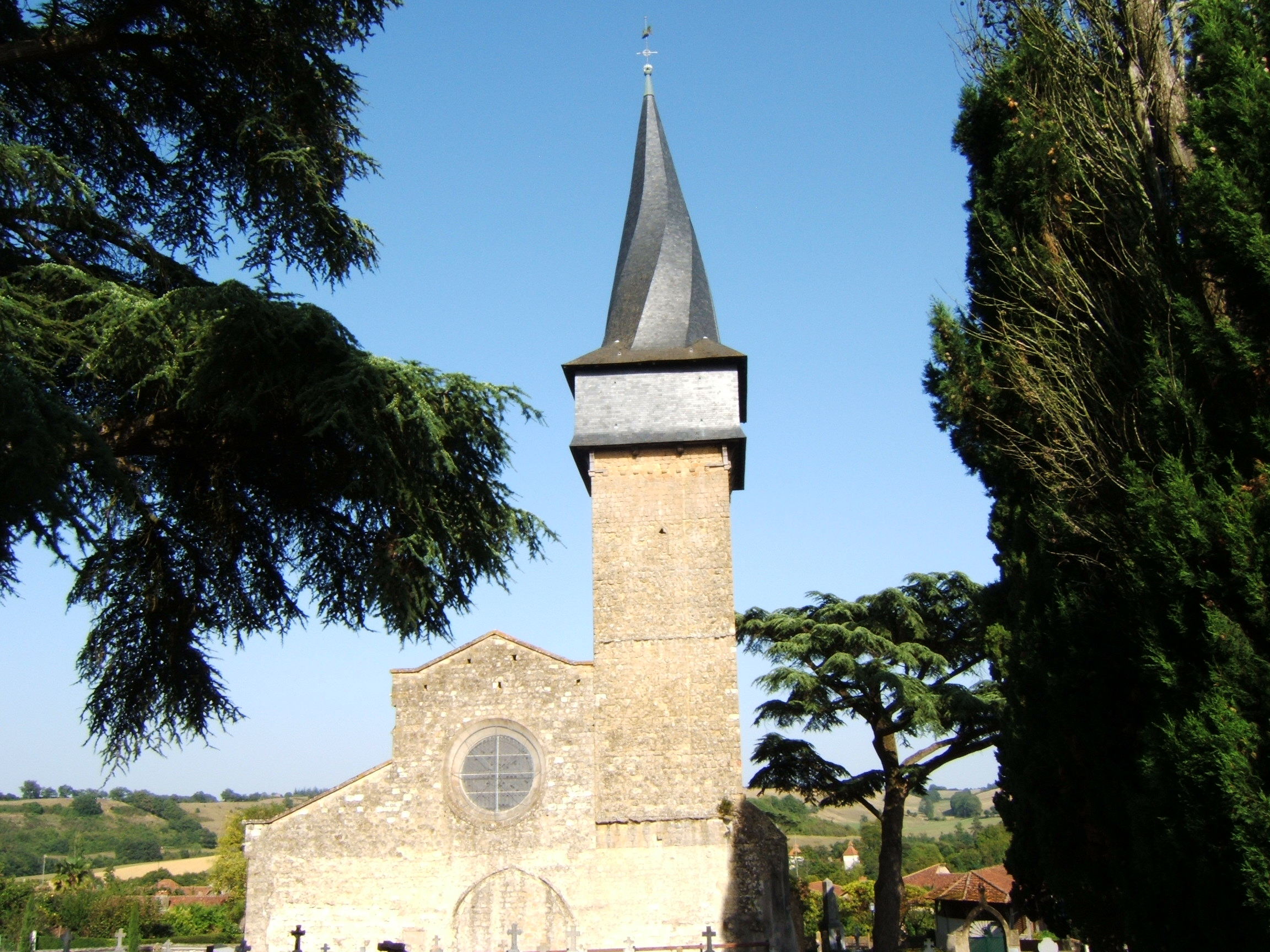
Barran

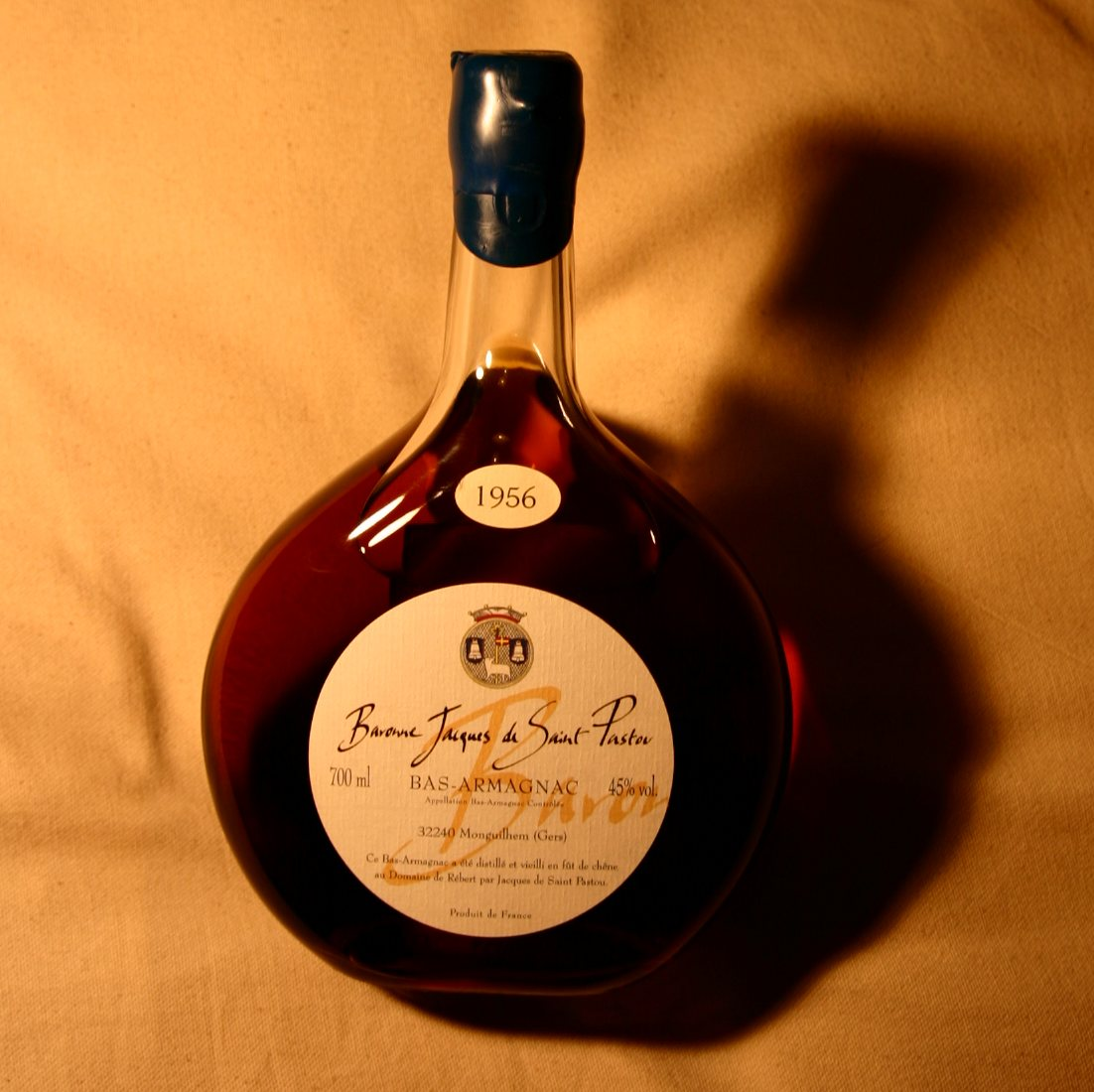
Armagnac

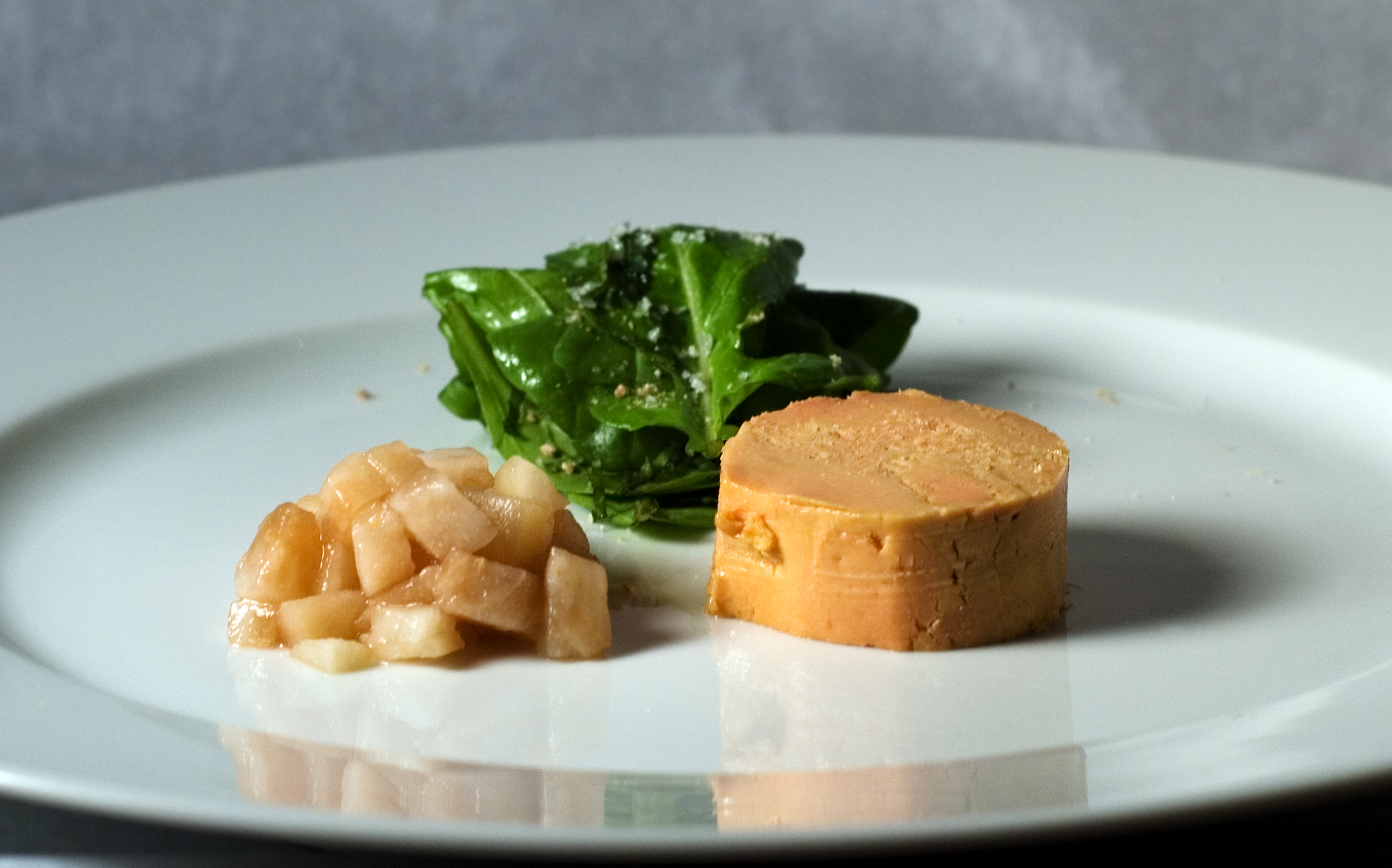
Moulard duck foie gras with pickled pear

== See also ==
- Cantons of the Gers department
- Communes of the Gers department
- Arrondissements of the Gers department
