= 2017 in the United States =

- Decades: 1990s; 2000s; 2010s; 2020s; 2030s
- See also: History of the United States (2016–present); Timeline of United States history (2010–present); List of years in the United States

Events in the year 2017 in the United States.

== Incumbents ==
=== Federal government ===
- President:

Barack Obama (D-Illinois) (until January 20)
Donald Trump (R-New York) (starting January 20)

- Vice President:

Joe Biden (D-Delaware) (until January 20)
Mike Pence (R-Indiana) (starting January 20)

- Chief Justice: John Roberts (Maryland)
- Speaker of the House of Representatives: Paul Ryan (R-Wisconsin)
- Senate Majority Leader: Mitch McConnell (R-Kentucky)
- Congress: 114th (until January 3), 115th (starting January 3)

==== State governments ====
Governors and lieutenant governors

=== Governors ===
- Governor of Alabama: Robert J. Bentley (Republican) (until April 10), Kay Ivey (Republican) (starting April 10)
- Governor of Alaska: Bill Walker (Independent)
- Governor of Arizona: Doug Ducey (Republican)
- Governor of Arkansas: Asa Hutchinson (Republican)
- Governor of California: Jerry Brown (Democratic)
- Governor of Colorado: John Hickenlooper (Democratic)
- Governor of Connecticut: Dannel Malloy (Democratic)
- Governor of Delaware: Jack Markell (Democratic) (until January 17), John Carney (Democratic) (starting January 17)
- Governor of Florida: Rick Scott (Republican)
- Governor of Georgia: Nathan Deal (Republican)
- Governor of Hawaii: David Ige (Democratic)
- Governor of Idaho: Butch Otter (Republican)
- Governor of Illinois: Bruce Rauner (Republican)
- Governor of Indiana: Mike Pence (Republican) (until January 9), Eric Holcomb (Republican) (starting January 9)
- Governor of Iowa: Terry Branstad (Republican) (until May 24), Kim Reynolds (Republican) (starting May 24)
- Governor of Kansas: Sam Brownback (Republican)
- Governor of Kentucky: Matt Bevin (Republican)
- Governor of Louisiana: John Bel Edwards (Democratic)
- Governor of Maine: Paul LePage (Republican)
- Governor of Maryland: Larry Hogan (Republican)
- Governor of Massachusetts: Charlie Baker (Republican)
- Governor of Michigan: Rick Snyder (Republican)
- Governor of Minnesota: Mark Dayton (Democratic)
- Governor of Mississippi: Phil Bryant (Republican)
- Governor of Missouri: Jay Nixon (Democratic) (until January 9), Eric Greitens (Republican) (starting January 9)
- Governor of Montana: Steve Bullock (Democratic)
- Governor of Nebraska: Pete Ricketts (Republican)
- Governor of Nevada: Brian Sandoval (Republican)
- Governor of New Hampshire:
  - until January 2: Maggie Hassan (Democratic)
  - January 3–5: Chuck Morse (Republican)
  - starting January 5 Chris Sununu (Republican)
- Governor of New Jersey: Chris Christie (Republican)
- Governor of New Mexico: Susana Martinez (Republican)
- Governor of New York: Andrew Cuomo (Democratic)
- Governor of North Carolina: Pat McCrory (Republican) (until January 1), Roy Cooper (Democratic) (starting January 1)
- Governor of North Dakota: Doug Burgum (Republican)
- Governor of Ohio: John Kasich (Republican)
- Governor of Oklahoma: Mary Fallin (Republican)
- Governor of Oregon: Kate Brown (Democratic)
- Governor of Pennsylvania: Tom Wolf (Democratic)
- Governor of Rhode Island: Gina Raimondo (Democratic)
- Governor of South Carolina: Nikki Haley (Republican) (until January 24), Henry McMaster (Republican) (starting January 24)
- Governor of South Dakota: Dennis Daugaard (Republican)
- Governor of Tennessee: Bill Haslam (Republican)
- Governor of Texas: Greg Abbott (Republican)
- Governor of Utah: Gary Herbert (Republican)
- Governor of Vermont: Peter Shumlin (Democratic) (until January 7), Phil Scott (Republican) (starting January 7)
- Governor of Virginia: Terry McAuliffe (Democratic)
- Governor of Washington: Jay Inslee (Democratic)
- Governor of West Virginia: Earl Ray Tomblin (Democratic) (until January 16), Jim Justice (Democratic/Republican) (starting January 16)
- Governor of Wisconsin: Scott Walker (Republican)
- Governor of Wyoming: Matt Mead (Republican)

=== Lieutenant governors ===
- Lieutenant Governor of Alabama: Kay Ivey (Republican) (until April 10), vacant (starting April 10)
- Lieutenant Governor of Alaska: Byron Mallott (Democratic)
- Lieutenant Governor of Arkansas: Tim Griffin (Republican)
- Lieutenant Governor of California: Gavin Newsom (Democratic)
- Lieutenant Governor of Colorado: Donna Lynne (Democratic)
- Lieutenant Governor of Connecticut: Nancy Wyman (Democratic)
- Lieutenant Governor of Delaware: vacant (until January 17), Bethany Hall-Long (Democratic) (starting January 17)
- Lieutenant Governor of Florida: Carlos López-Cantera (Republican)
- Lieutenant Governor of Georgia: Casey Cagle (Republican)
- Lieutenant Governor of Hawaii: Shan Tsutsui (Democratic)
- Lieutenant Governor of Idaho: Brad Little (Republican)
- Lieutenant Governor of Indiana: Eric Holcomb (Republican) (until January 9), Suzanne Crouch (Republican) (starting January 9)
- Lieutenant Governor of Illinois: Evelyn Sanguinetti (Republican)
- Lieutenant Governor of Iowa: Kim Reynolds (Republican) (until May 24), vacant (starting May 24)
- Lieutenant Governor of Kansas: Jeff Colyer (Republican)
- Lieutenant Governor of Kentucky: Jenean Hampton (Republican)
- Lieutenant Governor of Louisiana: Billy Nungesser (Republican)
- Lieutenant Governor of Maryland: Boyd Rutherford (Republican)
- Lieutenant Governor of Massachusetts: Karyn Polito (Republican)
- Lieutenant Governor of Michigan: Brian Calley (Republican)
- Lieutenant Governor of Minnesota: Tina Smith (Democratic)
- Lieutenant Governor of Mississippi: Tate Reeves (Republican)
- Lieutenant Governor of Missouri: Peter Kinder (Republican) (until January 9), Mike Parson (Republican) (starting January 9)
- Lieutenant Governor of Montana: Mike Cooney (Democratic)
- Lieutenant Governor of Nebraska: Mike Foley (Republican)
- Lieutenant Governor of Nevada: Mark Hutchison (Republican)
- Lieutenant Governor of New Jersey: Kim Guadagno (Republican)
- Lieutenant Governor of New Mexico: John Sanchez (Republican)
- Lieutenant Governor of New York: Kathy Hochul (Democratic)
- Lieutenant Governor of North Carolina: Dan Forest (Republican)
- Lieutenant Governor of North Dakota: Brent Sanford (Republican)
- Lieutenant Governor of Ohio: Mary Taylor (Republican)
- Lieutenant Governor of Oklahoma: Todd Lamb (Republican)
- Lieutenant Governor of Pennsylvania: Mike Stack (Democratic)
- Lieutenant Governor of Rhode Island: Daniel McKee (Democratic)
- Lieutenant Governor of South Carolina:
  - Henry McMaster (Republican) (until January 24)
  - vacant (January 24–25)
  - Kevin L. Bryant (Republican) (starting January 25)
- Lieutenant Governor of South Dakota: Matt Michels (Republican)
- Lieutenant Governor of Tennessee: Ron Ramsey (Republican)
- Lieutenant Governor of Texas: Dan Patrick (Republican)
- Lieutenant Governor of Utah: Spencer Cox (Republican)
- Lieutenant Governor of Vermont: Phil Scott (Republican) (until January 7), David Zuckerman (Progressive) (starting January 7)
- Lieutenant Governor of Virginia: Ralph Northam (Democratic)
- Lieutenant Governor of Washington: Brad Owen (Democratic) (until January 10), Cyrus Habib (Democratic) (starting January 10)
- Lieutenant Governor of Wisconsin: Rebecca Kleefisch (Republican)

== Events ==
=== January ===
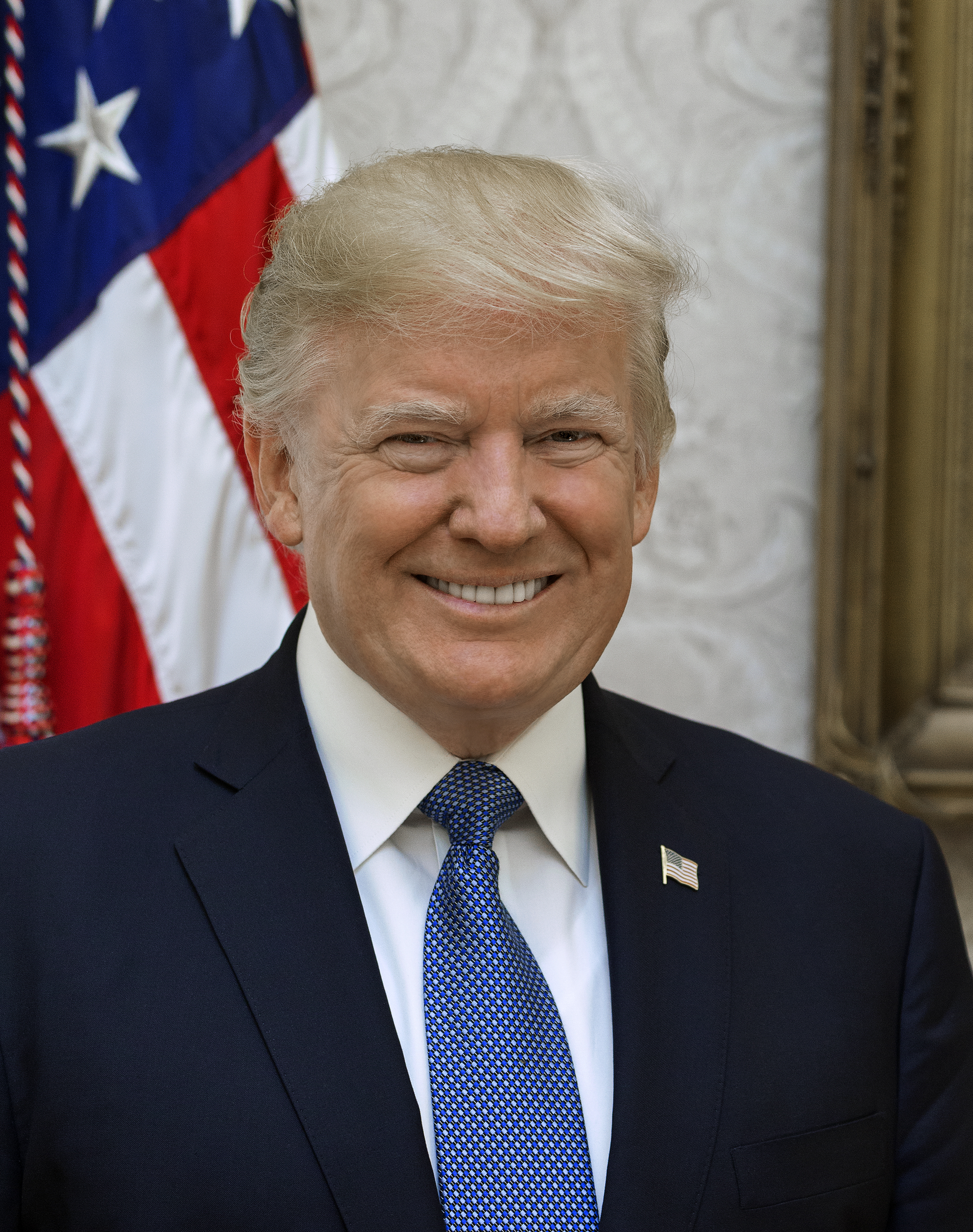
January 20: Donald Trump becomes the 45th U.S. president

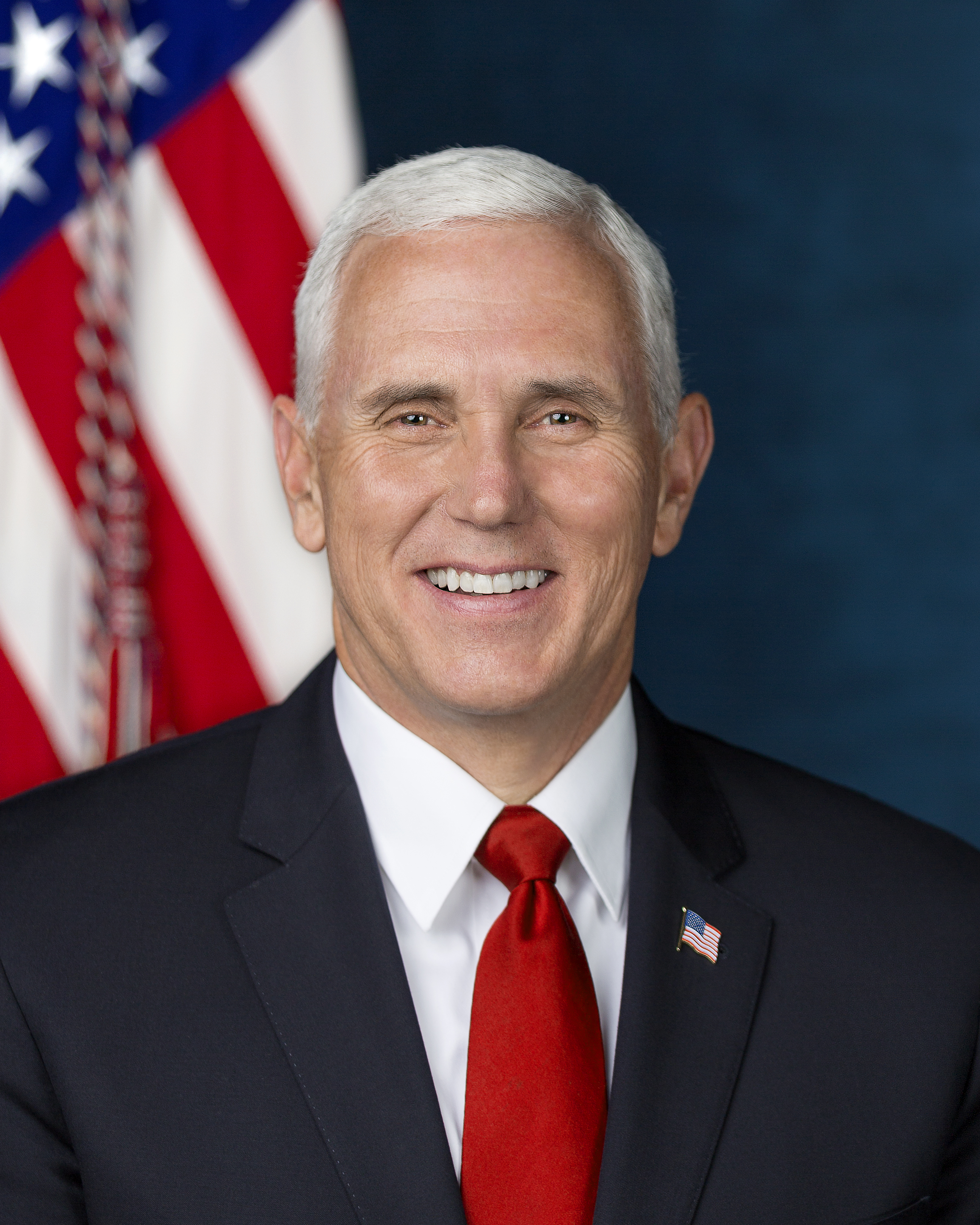
January 20: Mike Pence becomes the 48th U.S. vice president

- January 1 – Nevada's ballot initiative legalizing recreational marijuana officially goes into effect.
- January 3
  - Four African-American individuals kidnap a mentally disabled white man in Chicago, Illinois and livestream their torture of him on Facebook, shouting "Fuck Trump" and "Fuck white people" while doing so, prompting widespread reactions on social media. The four suspects are later arrested and charged with a hate crime.
  - The 115th United States Congress begins its first session.
- January 4
  - A Long Island Railroad passenger train collides with buffer stops at Atlantic Terminal in New York City, injuring 103 people.
  - NASA selects Lucy and Psyche as the 13th and 14th missions of the Discovery Program, the result of a two-year long competition.
- January 6
  - After briefing President Barack Obama, the United States Senate, and President-elect Donald Trump, the United States Intelligence Community releases a declassified version of its investigation into Russia's interference in the 2016 presidential election. The report asserts that Russia carried out a massive cyber operation on orders from President Vladimir Putin to influence the election in favor of Trump in a multipronged attack consisting of hacking the Democratic National Committee, use of social media and Internet trolls to spread misinformation, and open propaganda on Russian state media outlets. Trump asserts that the outcome of the election was not affected by the interference, but nonetheless announces his intention to appoint a team to combat international cyber attacks within his first 90 days in office.
  - A gunman opens fire at the Fort Lauderdale–Hollywood International Airport in Broward County, Florida, killing five people and injuring an additional six, with another 36 people sustaining injuries in the ensuing panic on the tarmac. The suspect was placed in custody after surrendering to police.
  - The 115th United States Congress confirms the Electoral College victory of Donald Trump in the 2016 presidential election.
- January 8
  - The 74th Golden Globe Awards are held at The Beverly Hilton in Beverly Hills, California. La La Land breaks the record for most awards given to a single film with seven wins out of seven nominations, including the award for Best Motion Picture – Musical or Comedy. Moonlight wins the award for Best Motion Picture – Drama. The Crown wins the award for Best Drama Series and Atlanta wins Best Comedy Series. Particular attention is brought to actress Meryl Streep's acceptance speech for the Cecil B. DeMille Lifetime Achievement Award, in which she criticizes President-elect Donald Trump for what she perceived as his indecency and demonizing of the press and immigrants during his campaign. Trump responded on Twitter, calling Streep "overrated" and denying her allegations that he mocked a disabled reporter.
  - SeaWorld San Diego hosts its final orca performance after years of criticism of their keeping killer whales in captivity.
- January 9
  - Mike Pence's term as Governor of Indiana ends, 11 days before he becomes Vice President of the United States.
  - Eric Holcomb is inaugurated as the 51st governor of Indiana at the State House in Indianapolis.
- January 10
  - Dylann Roof, convicted perpetrator of the 2015 Charleston church shooting, is sentenced to death. He is the first person in the US to face execution for federal hate crime charges.
  - Outgoing President Barack Obama delivers his farewell speech at McCormick Place in his hometown of Chicago.
  - Killing of Ashley Zhao by her parents Ming Ming Chen and Liang Zhao in Jackson Township, Ohio.
- January 11 – Donald Trump holds his first press conference since being elected president, wherein he derides the American news media for running what he considers to be false stories against him, particularly a January 10 CNN report stating that classified documents briefed to President Trump and Barack Obama contained presently unsubstantiated allegations that Russian operatives possess "compromising personal and financial information" about Trump that could be used as blackmail.
  - The Playboy Mansion is put up for sale however the terms of the sale state that the company's founder Hugh Hefner must live there until he dies.
- January 12
  - Justice Department Inspector General Michael E. Horowitz launches an investigation into the conduct of the Justice Department and the Federal Bureau of Investigation, specifically the decision of FBI Director James Comey to reopen the investigation into Hillary Clinton's use of a private email server less than two weeks before the 2016 presidential election.
  - As an act of reassurance to NATO allies, the Obama administration deploys over 3,000 American troops to Poland to ensure protection from any possible future aggression from Russia, who subsequently call the act a threat to their national security.
  - Massachusetts Attorney General Maura Healey orders ExxonMobil to hand over documents related to a state investigation into whether the company misled the public about the impact of fossil fuels on global climate.
- January 13 – The Justice Department concludes its 13-month investigation into the Chicago Police Department and finds that the department regularly violated citizens' civil rights through the use of excessive force, particularly toward African-American and Latino individuals.
- January 14 – SpaceX launches its first Falcon 9 rocket since a vehicle exploded in September 2016, launching from Vandenberg Air Force Base in California.
- January 17 – Three days before leaving office, President Obama commutes Chelsea Manning's sentence for leaking documents to WikiLeaks.
- January 19
  - Mexican drug kingpin El Chapo is extradited to the United States to await trial.
  - Outgoing President Obama commutes the sentences of 330 prisoners, most of them nonviolent drug offenders. It is the highest number of commutations ever given in a single day by a US president.
- January 20 – Donald Trump is sworn in as the 45th president of the United States, and Mike Pence is sworn in as the 48th vice president.
- January 21 – 2.9 million people attend the Women's March in opposition to the inauguration of Donald Trump, making it the single biggest protest in U.S. history.
- January 23
  - President Donald Trump signs an executive order withdrawing the US from the controversial trade pact, the Trans-Pacific Partnership (TPP).
  - President Trump issues an executive order freezing hiring to the federal government, excluding the military.
- January 24
  - President Trump signs a series of presidential memorandums allowing the federal government to move forward with the controversial Dakota Access Pipeline and Keystone XL pipeline.
  - The Trump administration freezes all new research grants and contracts for the Environmental Protection Agency and temporarily bars its employees from posting press releases or updates to the agency's social media accounts and from speaking to the press.
  - The nominees for the 89th Academy Awards are announced. The nominees for Best Picture are Arrival, Fences, Hacksaw Ridge, Hell or High Water, Hidden Figures, La La Land, Lion, Manchester by the Sea, and Moonlight. La La Land ties with Titanic (1997) and All About Eve (1950) for the most Oscar nominations for a single film, with fourteen nominations.
- January 25
  - President Trump signs a set of executive orders directing the US Department of Homeland Security to use existing funds to begin construction on a wall on the U.S.–Mexico border and putting an end to the longstanding catch and release policy in an effort toward swifter deportations of illegal immigrants.
  - The Dow Jones Industrial Average reaches 20,000 points for the first time ever.
- January 26 – A 2007 interview is released in which Carolyn Bryant, for whom African-American teenager Emmett Till was accused of making verbal and physical advances on, leading to his lynching death in 1955, admits that she fabricated that aspect of her testimony against Till.
- January 27 –
  - President Trump signs an executive order banning the entry of refugees of the Syrian Civil War into the United States indefinitely, and banning the entry of all nationals, regardless of visa status, of Iran, Iraq, Syria, Libya, Somalia, Sudan, and Yemen to the US for 90 days. The order prompts international criticism, a lawsuit from the American Civil Liberties Union, the detainment of legal Muslim travelers at several international airports, and Iran announcing a ban on entry of US citizens into the country until the ban is lifted.
  - Vice President Mike Pence attends and speaks at the March for Life, becoming the first vice president and the then highest-ranking federal official to do so.
- January 30 – President Trump fires acting United States Attorney General Sally Yates after she instructs the Justice Department to not carry out Trump's recent executive order on refugees and immigrants.
- January 31 – President Trump nominates federal appellate judge Neil Gorsuch to fill the vacant seat on the Supreme Court left by the death of Antonin Scalia in 2016.

=== February ===
- February 1 – The Department of Homeland Security Inspector General office opens an investigation into the implementation of Executive Order 13769.
- February 3
  - The Trump administration enacts new sanctions against 25 entities in Iran in retaliation for their recent ballistic missile test.
  - President Donald Trump signs an executive order to review and eventually scale back the Dodd-Frank Wall Street Reform and Consumer Protection Act put in place after the Great Recession.
  - Washington state Attorney General Bob Ferguson secures a nationwide temporary restraining order on President Trump's immigration ban from judge James Robart, calling it unlawful and unconstitutional.
- February 5 – In Super Bowl LI, the New England Patriots defeat the Atlanta Falcons 34–28 in the first overtime game in the game's history.
- February 7
  - Betsy DeVos is confirmed as the new US Secretary of Education by the United States Senate in a 51–50 vote, with Vice President Mike Pence casting the tiebreaker vote. It is the first time in Senate history that a vice president has done so for a Cabinet nominee confirmation.
  - A tornado impacts New Orleans, Louisiana, leaving approximately 10,000 homes without electricity.
- February 12
  - Nearly 200,000 people are evacuated around Oroville, California, and surrounding areas due to an emergency spillway failure at Oroville Dam.
  - The annual 59th Grammy Awards are held in the Staples Center in Los Angeles.
- February 14 – It is reported that President Trump's election campaign aides and other associates had repeated contacts with Russian intelligence officials in the year before the election.
- February 17 – President Donald Trump visits the Boeing South Carolina facility to see the first 787–10 Dreamliner built.
- February 22
  - NASA announces that TRAPPIST-1, a star system 39 light years away, has been found to contain seven Earth-sized planets. At least three are in the habitable zone, but all seven have the potential to support liquid water.
  - An Indian engineer is shot dead and another injured in Olathe, Kansas, in an apparent hate crime.
- February 23 – Police forcibly evict all remaining Dakota Access Pipeline protesters, arresting thirty-three people.
- February 25 – Democrat Stephanie Hansen wins a special election, ensuring her party retains its 44-year control of the Delaware Senate. Democrats across the country, motivated by antipathy to Trump's presidency, raised over a million dollars for her campaign, a record amount for an election to the Delaware legislature and any special election in the state. Former Vice President Joseph Biden also went door-to-door with her.
- February 26
  - Kurt Busch wins the Daytona 500 in the first race for NASCAR's newest race format.
  - The 89th Academy Awards, hosted by Jimmy Kimmel, are held at Dolby Theatre in Hollywood, with Barry Jenkins' Moonlight winning Best Picture. Additionally, Damien Chazelle wins Best Director and Emma Stone wins Best Actress for La La Land, and Casey Affleck wins Best Actor for Manchester by the Sea. La La Land wins six awards out of a record-tying 14 nominations. The telecast garners 33 million viewers.
  - In an embarrassing gaffe, La La Land is thought to be the winner of the Oscar for Best Picture, before the envelope is shown to reveal Moonlight as the actual winner.

=== March ===
- March 2 – President Trump visits the aircraft carrier, the USS Gerald R. Ford.
- March 3 - Three women accuse That 70's Show actor Danny Masterson of sexually assaulting them between 2001 and 2003 and claim a cover-up by the Church of Scientology, prompting an investigation by Los Angeles Police Department.
- March 6 - President Trump issues Executive Order 13780, replacing Executive Order 13769. This new order removes Iraq from the list of banned countries.
- March 15
  - The U.S. Federal Reserve raises interest rates from 0.75 to 1.0%.
  - President Trump's revised travel ban on Muslims and refugees is blocked by federal judges Derrick Watson in Hawaii and Theodore D. Chuang in Maryland.
- March 16 – Sebastian Gorka, a top advisor to President Trump, faces calls to resign after he is revealed to be a member of a Hungarian Nazi group.
- March 18 – Rock and roll pioneer Chuck Berry dies at the age of 90.
- March 20
  - The United States House Permanent Select Committee on Intelligence holds a hearing about Russian interference in the 2016 election and confirms that there is an ongoing investigation into ties between Trump's team and Russia.
  - The Senate Judiciary Committee begins hearings on the nomination of Judge Neil M. Gorsuch to the Supreme Court of the United States.
- March 27 – President Trump calls to investigate any ties with Hillary Clinton and Russia.
- March 28 – President Trump signs the Energy Independence Executive Order, intended to boost coal and other fossil fuel production by rolling back Obama-era policies on climate change and the environment.
- March 30
  - Michael Flynn offers to testify before Congress in exchange for immunity from prosecution in relation to alleged Russian influence on the 2016 presidential election.
  - SpaceX conducts the world's first reflight of an orbital class rocket.

=== April ===
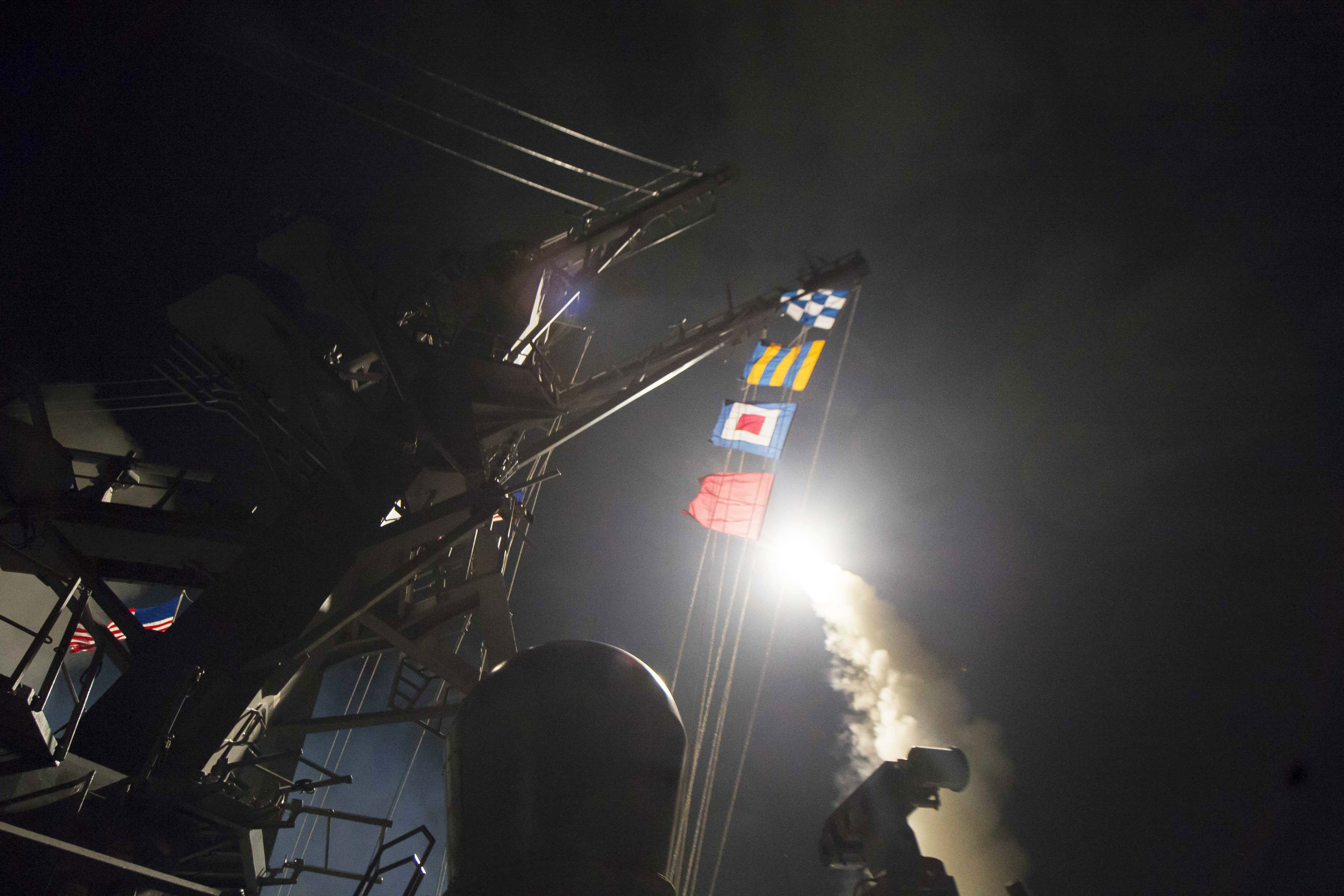
April 6: The U.S. directly attacks the Syrian government for the first time in the Syrian Civil War

- April 5 – President Trump removes his senior strategist Steve Bannon from the National Security Council.
- April 6 – In response to a suspected chemical weapons attack on a rebel-held town, the U.S. military launches 59 Tomahawk cruise missiles at an air base in Syria. Russia describes the strikes as an "aggression", adding they significantly damage US-Russia ties.
- April 7 – Andi Mack debuts on Disney Channel.
- April 9 – David Dao, an Asian physician, is physically assaulted and dragged off a United Airlines flight from Chicago to Louisville by police, prompting worldwide reaction.
- April 13 – a large non-nuclear bomb known as the GBU-43/B Massive Ordnance Air Blast (MOAB), is dropped by the United States in the Nangahar's Achin District in eastern Afghanistan to destroy tunnel complexes used by ISIL. It is the first time the weapon is used in a combat role.
- April 14 – Angelo Colon-Ortiz, 31, a suspect in the death of jogger Vanessa Marcotte, who disappeared on August 7, 2016, in Massachusetts and was later found dead, is arrested.
- April 15
  - Hundreds of President Trump's supporters clash with anti-Trump protesters in Berkeley, California. 21 people are arrested.
  - Protests erupt in cities across the country, most notably at Mar-a-Lago with hundreds of thousands of demonstrators demanding President Trump release his tax returns.
  - Federal judge Kristine Baker in Arkansas issues an injunction halting the execution by lethal injection of nine inmates, calling this method unconstitutional.
- April 16
  - Vice President Pence visits South Korea and calls North Korea's missile launch a 'provocation'.
  - Killing of Robert Godwin: 74-year-old Godwin, a retired foundry worker is shot and killed while walking on a sidewalk in the Glenville neighborhood of Cleveland, Ohio by 37-year-old Steve Stephens, who posted a video of the shooting on his Facebook account.
- April 17
  - Vice President Pence visits Camp Bonifas near the DMZ, unexpectedly deviating from his security plan and walking all the way to the military demarcation line, sending nearby security personnel scrambling.
  - President Trump, Melania and their son Barron kick off the 139th Annual Easter Egg Roll at the White House.
  - A State Department official warns of a "significant international response" if North Korea were to mount another nuclear test.
  - A U.S. Army Sikorsky UH-60 Black Hawk from Fort Belvoir, Virginia with three crew members aboard crashes near Leonardtown, Maryland. One of the crew members was taken by helicopter to a local hospital.
- April 18
  - Georgia's 6th congressional district special election, 2017; a special election to replace Tom Price is scheduled to take place, With no candidate managing to get over 50% of the vote, leading to a run-off election scheduled for June 20 (although Democrat Jon Ossoff won a plurality of the votes)
  - Disappearance of Etan Patz; Pedro Hernandez is sentenced to 25 years to life in prison for the murder of Etan Patz.
  - 39-year-old Kori Ali Muhammad kills three people in shootings in downtown Fresno
  - Killing of Robert Godwin: Murder suspect Steve Stephens is found dead of a self-inflicted gunshot wound after a brief police pursuit in Erie County, Pennsylvania.
- April 19
  - Vice President Pence gives a speech to troops stationed at the Yokosuka Naval Base aboard the USS Ronald Reagan
  - Aaron Hernandez commits suicide by hanging himself in prison.
  - Jason Chaffetz announces he will not run for re-election to his House seat in 2018.
  - Television host and author Bill O'Reilly is fired from Fox News following accusations of sexual assault.
- April 20
  - 15-year-old Elizabeth Thomas from Middle Tennessee is found safe in Northern California and 50-year-old kidnapper Tad Cummins is arrested after a four-week manhunt.
  - President Trump hosts Sarah Palin, Kid Rock and Ted Nugent at the White House.
  - President Trump holds a joint news conference with Italian PM Paolo Gentiloni.
- April 21 – Surgeon General Vivek Murthy is removed from his post by the Trump administration and replaced by Sylvia Trent-Adams.
- April 22 – March for Science.
- April 23
  - Kim Sang-duk, a Korean American professor is detained in North Korea.
  - Former President Barack Obama arrives in Chicago for a two-day visit and meets privately with at-risk young men on the South Side.
- April 24
  - Workers in New Orleans began to remove four monuments dedicated to the Confederacy era in New Orleans.
  - The entire Senate is invited to the White House for a briefing on North Korea.

=== May ===
- May 5 – Guardians of the Galaxy Vol. 2, directed by James Gunn, is released by Marvel Studios as the 15th film of the Marvel Cinematic Universe (MCU) and the sequel to 2014's Guardians of the Galaxy.
- May 9
  - A tunnel collapse occurs at the Hanford Site in Washington State.
  - FBI chief James Comey is fired by Trump for mishandling of the Hillary Clinton email controversy. However, critics accuse Trump of attempting to subvert the ongoing FBI investigation into possible ties between Russia and the Trump campaign.
- May 12 – 43-year-old Thomas Hartless kills three people, including a police chief, in a shooting attack at Kirkersville, Ohio.
- May 16
  - President Trump is accused of asking FBI chief James Comey to drop an inquiry into links between Michael Flynn and Russia.
  - President Trump is reported to have shared highly classified information with Russia, provided by Israeli intelligence, but stands by his "absolute right" to share it.
  - Turkey's Police Counter Attack Team attack a crowd of protesters at the Turkish Ambassador's Residence in Washington, D.C.
- May 17
  - Chelsea Manning is freed after serving seven years of her 35-year sentence for leaking diplomatic cables and military files to WikiLeaks.
  - Rep. Al Green (D-Texas) calls for President Trump to be impeached on the House floor.
  - The U.S. Justice Department names former FBI chief Robert Mueller as special counsel to investigate alleged Russian interference in the 2016 U.S. election and possible collusion between President Trump's campaign and Moscow.
- May 18
  - An 18-year-old woman is killed and 22 other people injured after a car plows into pedestrians at Times Square in New York. The driver, a 26-year-old former U.S. Navy member, is arrested.
  - A 1982 painting, Untitled, by the late Jean-Michel Basquiat, sells for $110 million at Sotheby's, becoming the most expensive work by an American artist ever sold at an auction.
- May 20 – Trump makes his first foreign visit as president, to Saudi Arabia, where he signs deals worth more than $350 billion. This includes a $110 billion arms deal – the single biggest in U.S. history.
- May 21 – The Ringling Bros. and Barnum & Bailey Circus stages the final show in its 146-year history at Nassau Veterans Memorial Coliseum in Uniondale, New York.
- May 23 – Murder of Reese Bowman in Baltimore, Maryland by her daycare worker.
- May 26 – An anti-Muslim stabbing attack aboard a Portland, Oregon commuter train kills two people and injures a third.
- May 27
  - President Trump attends the G7 summit, where the six other leaders reaffirm their commitment to the Paris climate accord, but Trump says he will delay a decision on the agreement until the following week.
  - Pandora – The World of Avatar opens at Animal Kingdom at Walt Disney World in Orlando, Florida.
- May 28 – Takuma Sato wins the 101st Indianapolis 500, becoming the first Japanese driver to win the event.

=== June ===
- June 1 – President Trump announces his intentions to withdraw the United States from the Paris Agreement.
- June 2 – Wonder Woman, directed by Patty Jenkins, is released as the fourth film in the DC Extended Universe.
- June 3 – Intelligence specialist Reality Winner is arrested in Texas on suspicion of leaking classified information to journalists.
- June 7 – The National Association for the Advancement of Colored People (NAACP) issues its first ever statewide travel advisory after Missouri passes SB-43.
- June 8 – Former FBI director James Comey testifies before the Senate Intelligence Committee about conversations he had with President Trump and whether he pressured him to drop an investigation into former National Security Advisor Michael Flynn.
- June 11
  - The 71st annual Tony Awards are held at Radio City Music Hall. Dear Evan Hansen wins six awards including Best Musical and Best Leading Actor for Ben Platt.
  - The Pittsburgh Penguins defeat the Nashville Predators in Game 6 of the Stanley Cup Finals to win the series 4–2 and win their 5th Stanley Cup title in their 50th season, winning the NHL Championship for the second year in a row. Penguins captain Sidney Crosby won the Conn Smythe Trophy as the NHL Playoffs MVP for the second consecutive year.
- June 12
  - President Trump convenes his first full cabinet meeting in the White House.
  - The Ninth U.S. Circuit Court of Appeals upholds a decision blocking President Trump's revised travel ban on people from six mainly Muslim nations.
  - The Golden State Warriors defeat the Cleveland Cavaliers in Game 5 of the NBA Finals to win the series 4–1 and win their 5th NBA championship and their second in three years, winning the title with the best postseason record in history going 16–1. Warriors forward Kevin Durant won his first NBA title and won the NBA Finals MVP award.
- June 14
  - House of Representatives Majority Whip Steve Scalise and his aides are hit by gunfire during a baseball practice in Virginia. The shooter is killed by a security detail.
  - The Federal Reserve raises its key interest rate by 0.25%, to a target range of 1 to 1.25%, the second increase of the year and its highest level since 2008.
  - Conor McGregor and Floyd Mayweather Jr. announce on Twitter that they will fight on August 26 after heavy anticipation at the T-Mobile Arena in Las Vegas, Nevada, with the event being dubbed as The Money Fight.
  - It is reported that special counsel Robert Mueller is investigating President Trump for possible obstruction of justice and whether he tried to end an inquiry into his sacked national security adviser.
  - A shooting at a UPS facility in San Francisco's Potrero Hill neighborhood leaves four dead, including the shooter, and six injured.
- June 16
  - Michelle Carter of Massachusetts is found guilty of involuntary manslaughter for encouraging her boyfriend Conrad Roy to take his own life. She had sent a number of text messages encouraging him to kill himself and as a result Roy died of carbon monoxide poisoning inside his vehicle in 2014.
  - Jeronimo Yanez is acquitted of all charges and is found to be not guilty in the case of the shooting of Philando Castile. He is later fired by the city of St. Anthony, Minnesota.
  - Pixar Animation Studios' 18th feature film, Cars 3, the sequel to 2011's Cars 2, is released in theaters.
- June 19 – Otto Warmbier, an American student detained in North Korea, dies after suffering from what is believed to be a cardiopulmonary event.
- June 20 – A severe heatwave causes more than 40 American Airlines planes to be grounded.

=== July ===
- July 7 – Spider-Man: Homecoming, the second reboot of the Spider-Man film franchise directed by Jon Watts, is released by Marvel Studios and Columbia Pictures as the 16th film of the Marvel Cinematic Universe (MCU).
- July 9 – It is reported that President Trump's eldest son, Donald Trump Jr., met with a Russian lawyer after being promised damaging information on Hillary Clinton during the 2016 election.
- July 11 – Donald Trump Jr. releases email transcripts, via Twitter, showing he was offered "sensitive" information about Hillary Clinton from a Russian contact, and replied "I love it".
- July 15
  - Police officer Mohamed Noor murders Australian woman Justine Damond near her home in Minneapolis, Minnesota after she called 9–1–1 to report a nearby assault. The police officers did not have their body cameras turned on and the reason for the shooting is unclear, prompting protests in the city.
  - Flash floods occur at a popular swimming hole near Payson, Arizona, killing 10 people and injuring 4 more.
- July 18 – A Senate GOP bill to repeal and replace large portions of Obamacare fails to win enough support to pass.
- July 20 – Former US football star and actor O. J. Simpson is granted parole after nine years in a Nevada prison.
- July 21
  - White House press secretary Sean Spicer resigns in protest at the appointment of communications director Anthony Scaramucci.
  - Raven's Home debuts on Disney Channel.
- July 22 – In a tweet, President Trump asserts his "complete power to pardon." This follows reports that he had been discussing his ability to pardon people under investigation for possible ties between his campaign and Russia meddling with the 2016 election.
- July 24 – President Trump sparks controversy after giving a highly politicized speech to approximately 35,000 Boy Scouts at the 2017 National Scout Jamboree.
- July 25
  - The US Senate votes to start debating a new Republican healthcare bill to replace Obamacare.
  - The US House of Representatives votes to impose fresh sanctions on Russia, despite President Trump objecting to the legislation.
- July 26
  - The President tweets that transgender people cannot serve in "any capacity" in the US military.
  - The first gene editing of human embryos in the USA is reported to have taken place, using CRISPR.
  - The United States men's national soccer team defeats Jamaica 2–1 in the final to win the 2017 CONCACAF Gold Cup title, their 6th overall.
  - The FBI raids the home of Paul Manafort, a former chairman of the Trump campaign, regarding potential collusion between Russia and the Trump campaign.
- July 27
  - Jeff Bezos briefly becomes the world's richest person, surpassing Bill Gates with a net worth of just over $90 billion. He loses the title later in the day when Amazon's stock drops, returning him to second place with a net worth just below $90 billion.
  - In a 235–192 vote, the House passes a $788 billion spending bill that combines a $1.6 billion down payment for President Donald Trump's controversial border wall with Mexico and a large budget increase for the Pentagon.
  - A third attempt to repeal Obamacare fails after it is voted down by 51 votes to 49. Three Republicans – John McCain, Susan Collins and Lisa Murkowski – vote against the bill.
- July 28
  - Reince Priebus is removed as White House Chief of Staff, with President Trump naming General John Kelly as his replacement.
  - President Trump removes Anthony Scaramucci as White House communications director, just ten days after his appointment.
  - It is reported that President Trump personally dictated his son Donald Trump Jr.'s statement on his talks with a Russian lawyer during the election campaign.

=== August ===
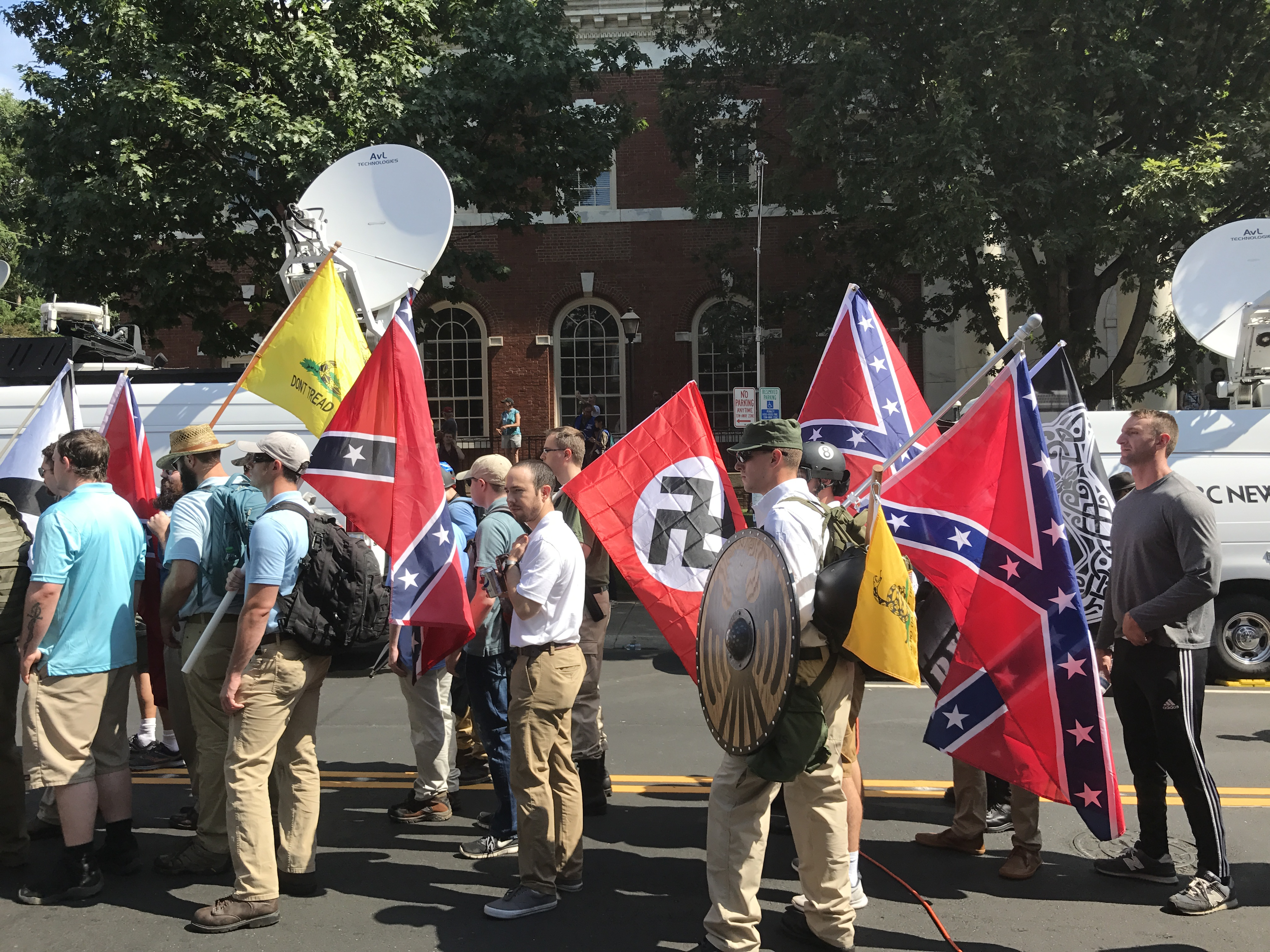
August 12: The Unite the Right rally left three people dead

- August 1 – A top EPA official, Elizabeth "Betsy" Southerland, resigns in protest at the direction of the agency under the Trump administration.
- August 2
  - Grandmaster Flash member Kidd Creole is arrested in New York on murder charges after a homeless man is found with multiple stab wounds to his torso.
  - White House press secretary Sarah Huckabee Sanders confirms in her daily briefing that two supposed phone calls to President Trump never actually took place – the first from the Boy Scouts, who Trump falsely claimed had praised him for the best speech ever delivered in the organization's 100-year history; the second from Mexican President Enrique Peña Nieto, who Trump falsely claimed had complimented his border control efforts.
- August 3
  - Transcripts from a phone call released by The Washington Post show that President Trump had urged Mexican President Enrique Peña Nieto to stop saying he would refuse to pay for the proposed border wall. Another transcript is released of a heated argument between Trump and the Australian Prime Minister Malcolm Turnbull.
  - The special counsel investigating claims of Russian meddling in the US election begins using a grand jury in Washington.
  - West Virginia governor Jim Justice announces he is switching parties from Democrat to Republican at a rally with Trump.
- August 4
  - Martin Shkreli is found guilty in federal court on three counts of fraud related to two hedge funds he ran, MSMB Capital and MSMB Healthcare.
  - In a letter to Darwin Life, Inc. and New Hope Fertility Center, the FDA warns that the "three parent baby" technique should not be marketed in the U.S.
- August 5 – A tornado takes place near Tulsa, Oklahoma.
- August 6 – Sharknado 5: Global Swarming airs for the first time on Syfy.
- August 8
  - After reports that North Korea has produced a nuclear warhead small enough to fit inside its missiles, President Trump warns that the country "will be met with fire and fury" if it threatens the US.
  - North Korea states that it is considering a missile strike against the Andersen Air Force Base in Guam.
- August 9 – North Korea releases a statement that the Korean People's Army Strategic Force is considering firing multiple Hwasong-12 IRBMs near Guam as a warning shot against the United States.
- August 12 – The Unite the Right rally, a gathering of alt-right, white nationalist, neo-Nazi, and neo-Confederate groups protesting the removal of the Robert Edward Lee Sculpture and other Confederate monuments and memorials from public spaces, is held in Charlottesville, Virginia. Violent clashes break out between attendees and counter-protesters; 32-year-old Heather Heyer is killed and many others are injured when a car ploughs into a group of people; and two Virginia State Police troopers are killed when their surveillance helicopter crashes, prompting Governor Terry McAuliffe to declare a state of emergency.
- August 14 – After several days of public pressure, President Donald Trump explicitly condemns the white supremacist groups involved in violent clashes at Charlottesville.
- August 15
  - President Trump is criticized by leaders in the Republican and Democrat parties for backpedaling on explicitly condemning the white supremacist groups involved in the Charlottesville 'Unite the Right' rally.
  - Following a week of escalating tensions between North Korea and the United States, North Korean leader Kim Jong-un opts to wait on attacking Guam.
- August 16
  - President Trump disbands two of his business councils after multiple members resign in response to the President's handling of the Charlottesville incident.
  - Former president Barack Obama's Twitter response to the Charlottesville rally, in which he posted a quote from Nelson Mandela, receives over 4 million 'likes' and becomes the most 'liked' tweet ever.
  - Regarding the earlier violence in Charlottesville, former presidents George H. W. Bush and George W. Bush call upon incumbent President Trump to "reject racial bigotry, anti-Semitism and hatred in all forms."
- August 18
  - Steve Bannon is fired from his positions as the White House Chief Strategist and Senior Counselor to the President. In a statement later, he says "The Trump presidency we fought for and won is over. We still have this huge movement, and there'll be good days and bad days, but that presidency is over."
  - A mass resignation of the President's Committee on the Arts and Humanities is made in protest against Trump's response to the Unite the Right rally in Charlottesville, Virginia.
  - A search team financed by Paul Allen locates the wreck of the USS Indianapolis in the Philippine Sea, 72 years after it was sunk by a Japanese submarine.
- August 19 – Up to 30,000 people gather on Boston Common to protest a right-wing rally, motivated in part as a response to the recent Unite the Right rally in Charlottesville.
- August 20 – An oil tanker collides with the USS John S. McCain near Singapore, injuring five US Navy sailors and leaving ten missing.
- August 21 – A total solar eclipse takes place. It is the first total solar eclipse of the 21st century for the United States, the first visible from the continental U.S. since February 26, 1979, and the first to span the entire continental U.S. since June 8, 1918. Totality occurs along a path curving from Oregon to South Carolina, and lasts at most for 2 minutes and 40.2 seconds. The location and time of "greatest eclipse" is on the western edge of Christian County, Kentucky, at 36.9715 degrees north and 87.6559 degrees west, occurring at 18:25 UTC.
- August 22 – At a "Make America Great Again" rally in Phoenix, Arizona, President Trump says he will close down the US government if necessary to build his wall along the Mexico border.
- August 23 – The science envoy for the State Department, Daniel Kammen, resigns following President Trump's response to the rally in Charlottesville. In his resignation letter addressed to Trump, the first letter of every paragraph spells out "impeach".
- August 24
  - A woman from Chicopee, Massachusetts wins $758.7m—the largest jackpot in North American history—in the Powerball lottery.
  - For the first time, a drug-cocktail of etomidate, rocuronium bromide, and potassium acetate is used by the United States for lethal injection. The experimental injection is used to execute Mark Asay in Florida after concerns that a more conventional drug, midazolam, was causing prisoners to suffer agonizing deaths.
  - Hurricane Harvey forms in the Gulf of Mexico.
- August 25
  - Hurricane Harvey, a category 4 tropical cyclone, makes landfall in Texas. The hurricane is predicted to be the worst to strike Texas in 12 years.
  - A directive is signed by President Donald Trump that bans transgender military recruits.
  - President Trump pardons former Maricopa County sheriff Joe Arpaio, who had previously been convicted of defying a court order to cease traffic patrols using racial profiling.
  - Sebastian Gorka, a military and intelligence analyst, resigns from his position as a White House counter-terrorism adviser.
- August 26
  - American Floyd Mayweather Jr. defeats Irishman Conor McGregor in the 10th round at "The Money Fight" boxing match in Las Vegas, extending his undefeated professional boxing streak to 50 victories and 0 defeats (50–0), surpassing the 49–0 record of Rocky Marciano.
  - New Tappan Zee Bridge over the Hudson River opens.
- August 27
  - Katy Perry hosts the 2017 MTV Video Music Awards at The Forum in Inglewood, California. American rapper Kendrick Lamar is the night's biggest winner, walking away with six awards.
  - Right-wing protesters and thousands of far-left counter-protesters clash in Berkeley, California. 11 people are injured and 21 are arrested.
- August 28 – President Trump signs an executive order allowing police to acquire and use military-style equipment.
- August 29
  - Following North Korea's firing of a ballistic missile over northern Japan, President Donald Trump warns that "all options are on the table" in terms of a response to North Korean aggression.
  - Both the Addicks Dam and Barker Dam in Houston begin overflowing due to Hurricane Harvey, worsening flooding hazards. A curfew is imposed in Houston to help prevent looting of evacuated homes.
  - U.S. President Donald Trump and First Lady Melania Trump arrive in Texas to survey the damage of Tropical Storm Harvey.
- August 30
  - U.S. District Judge Orlando Garcia blocks Texas's enforcement of a sanctuary city law.
  - The U.S. government orders the closure of Russian consulate facilities in San Francisco, D.C., and New York City.

=== September ===
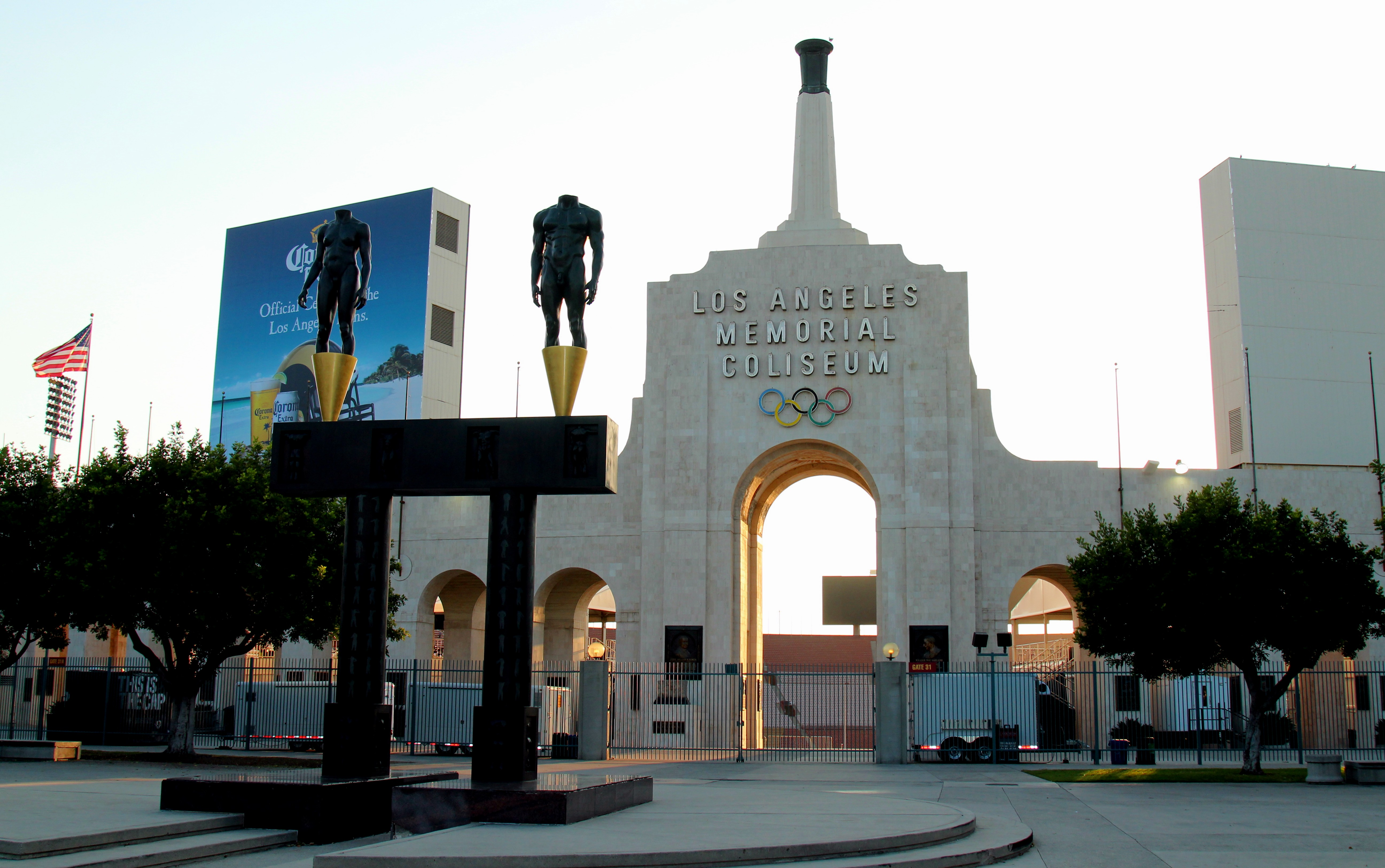
September 13: Los Angeles is awarded the rights to host the 2028 Summer Olympics

- September 3 – Media outlets publish the content of the letter Barack Obama left in the Resolute desk for President Donald Trump.
- September 4 – Governor Rick Scott declares a state of emergency for Florida as Hurricane Irma approaches from the Atlantic.
- September 5 – The Trump administration announces that the Deferred Action for Childhood Arrivals (DACA) immigration policy, which was set by the Obama administration in 2012, will be scrapped.
- September 9 – Sloane Stephens defeats Madison Keys in two sets to win the US Open women's singles tennis championship, her first Grand Slam title.
- September 10 – Millions of homes are left without power as the center of Hurricane Irma hits mainland Florida, just south of Naples.
- September 12
  - Seattle mayor Ed Murray resigns after facing multiple accusations of child abuse, rape and sexual molestation, including some from family members and children under his care. He denies the accusations.
  - Hillary Clinton's memoir, What Happened, is published, describing her experience as the Democratic Party's nominee for President of the United States in the 2016 election.
- September 13 – The International Olympic Committee awards Los Angeles, California, the rights to host for the 2028 Summer Olympics. It was alongside in Paris, for the winning selected city for the 2024 Summer Olympics, respectively.
- September 18 – Toys "R" Us files for Chapter 11 bankruptcy, stating the move will give it flexibility to deal with $5 billion in long-term debt and invest in improving current operations.
- September 19 – President Trump makes his first appearance at the United Nations, during which he claims the US may 'have no choice but to totally destroy North Korea'.
- September 20 – Hurricane Maria makes landfall in the US territory of Puerto Rico with maximum sustained winds of 250 km/h (155 mph). Millions of people are left without power.
- September 21 – American thriller film 1 Buck is released.
- September 22 – During a political rally in Alabama, President Trump criticizes NFL football players kneeling during the national anthem in protest of police brutality against African-Americans, saying that team owners should "fire" them for doing it. The comments spark widespread condemnation and increases in protests from players during the national anthem.
- September 27 – Playboy founder Hugh Hefner dies at the age of 91.
- September 29 – US Health Secretary Tom Price resigns over a scandal involving the use of expensive private planes for official business.
- September 30 – President Donald Trump receives widespread backlash for attacking Carmen Yulín Cruz, the mayor of San Juan, Puerto Rico, on Twitter after she criticizes the United States federal government's response to the devastation from Hurricane Maria in the territory.

=== October ===
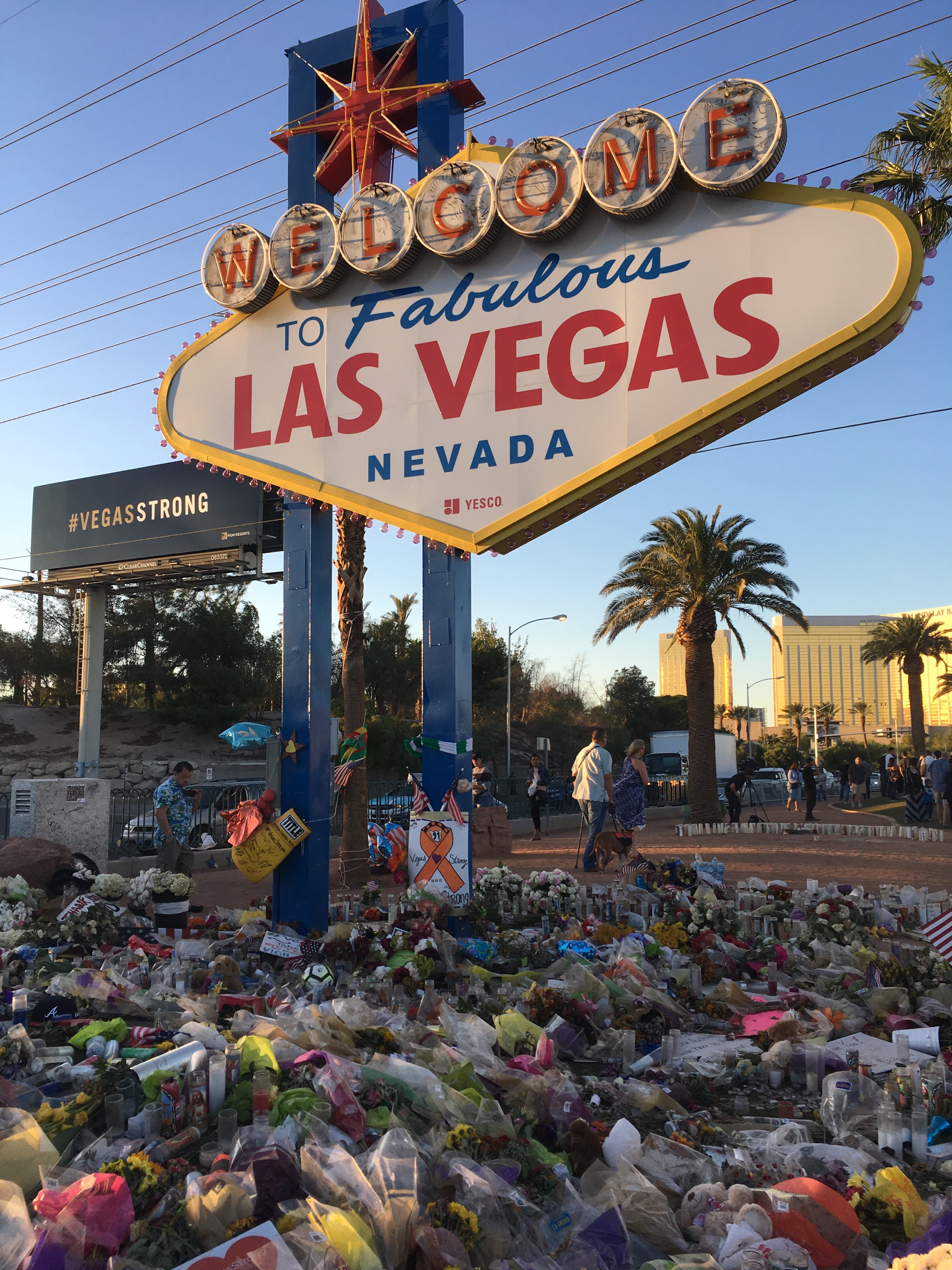
October 1: Flowers adorn the Las Vegas sign after the deadliest shooting in modern U.S. history

- October 1
  - Former US football star and actor O. J. Simpson is freed on parole after serving nine years of a 33-year sentence for armed robbery, assault with a deadly weapon, and 10 other charges.
  - Stephen Paddock opens fire on a crowd at the Route 91 Harvest music festival adjacent to the Mandalay Bay resort and casino at the Las Vegas Strip. 59 people were killed and 869 were injured, making it the deadliest mass shooting in modern U.S. history.
- October 5
  - The Department of Justice reverses an Obama-era policy which used Title VII of the Civil Rights Act to protect transgender employees from discrimination.
  - An exposé is published in The New York Times accusing film producer Harvey Weinstein of sexual harassment spanning three decades, involving a number of actresses and female production assistants, temps and other employees.Further allegations emerge in subsequent days, that Weinstein had assaulted or harassed 13 women, and raped three of them.
- October 6
  - The Trump administration issues a ruling that allows employers to opt out of providing free birth control to their employees.
  - The Vegas Golden Knights play their first NHL game in franchise history with a 2–1 win over the Dallas Stars.
- October 8 – October 2017 Northern California wildfires: The deadliest week of wildfires in California's history occurs, killing at least 35 people and leaving devastation across hundreds of thousands of acres.
- October 10
  - Las Vegas is the site of the first professional sports event in the city's history when the Vegas Golden Knights host the Arizona Coyotes at T-Mobile Arena there is a pre-game ceremony before puck drop to honor the victims of the mass shooting that had occurred nine days earlier.
  - The USA soccer team plays the last match against Trinidad and Tobago in qualifying for the 2018 FIFA World Cup to be played in Russia, the Americans had to win to qualify for the World Cup but lost 2 to 1 leaving them eliminated by first time in its history cutting a positive streak of 7 consecutive classifications to the world championships.
- October 11
  - President Trump threatens to shut down News Media for report his criticise in media.
  - It is announced that the Boy Scouts will allow girls to join for the first time in the program's 117-year history beginning in the fall of 2018.
- October 12 – The US announces its withdrawal from UNESCO, accusing it of "anti-Israel" bias.
- October 13 – In a speech at the White House, President Trump condemns Iran as a "fanatical regime", proposes new sanctions, and states that he will refuse to continue certifying the Joint Comprehensive Plan of Action, a landmark nuclear deal.
- October 26 – Nearly 3,000 files related to the assassination of President John F. Kennedy are released, while President Trump orders others to be withheld, citing national security concerns. The documents were scheduled for release in a 1992 law.
- October 27 – The first charges are filed in the investigation led by special counsel Robert Mueller into alleged Russia interference in the 2016 US election.
- October 30 – Actor Kevin Spacey issues an apology over an alleged sexual advance made towards a child actor 30 years previously. It is announced that Netflix will end the popular TV show House of Cards, in which Spacey has played the leading role. Further allegations arise in subsequent days.
- October 31 – A flatbed pickup truck is driven into pedestrians along West Street in Lower Manhattan, New York City, causing at least eight deaths and multiple injuries.

=== November ===
- November 1
  - Actor Dustin Hoffman is accused of sexually harassing a 17-year-old intern on the set of one of his films in 1985.
  - The Houston Astros defeated the Los Angeles Dodgers after seven games to become the World Series champions. The Astros World Series title comes at a time of healing for the city of Houston which was struck by Hurricane Harvey three months earlier.
  - General Council Daniel Nordby represents Florida Governor Rick Scott before the Florida Supreme Court in a landmark case.
- November 2
  - President Trump confirms Jerome Powell as his nominee for chair of the US Federal Reserve.
  - The New York City news websites DNAinfo and Gothamist are shut down by owner Joe Ricketts one week after the publications' employees voted to unionize.
- November 3
  - The latest National Climate Assessment, a 477-page report by 13 federal agencies, concludes that global warming is "extremely likely" (with 95 to 100% certainty) to be human-caused, mostly from the burning of fossil fuels. This contradicts statements from the Trump administration that carbon dioxide is not the primary contributor to global warming.
  - Thor: Ragnarok, directed by Taika Waititi, is released by Marvel Studios as the 17th film of the Marvel Cinematic Universe (MCU) and the sequel to 2011's Thor and 2013's Thor: The Dark World.
- November 4 – President Trump begins his first visit to Asia, a 13-day tour that will include Japan, South Korea, China, Vietnam, and the Philippines.
- November 5
  - 26-year-old Devin Kelley kills 26 people and injures 20 in a Baptist church in Sutherland Springs, Texas. It is the 5th deadliest shooting in United States history, and the deadliest in a place of worship.
  - Commerce Secretary Wilbur Ross is revealed by the Paradise Papers to have business links with Russian allies of President Vladimir Putin who are under US sanctions.
- November 6 – Entrepreneur Andrew Yang announces his candidacy for U.S. president in 2020.
- November 7 – In Virginia, Danica Roem becomes the first openly transgender person to win an election to a state legislature and serve her term, beating Republican Bob Marshall.
- November 9 – The New York Times publishes allegations from five women who said they were sexually harassed by Louis C.K. between the late 1990s and 2000.
- November 10 – XCom Global telecommunications company announces "the closure of its USA operations."
- November 12 – After North Korea denounces President Trump's Asia trip, calling it a "warmonger's visit" and describing the president as a "dotard", Trump responds on Twitter: "Why would Kim Jong-un insult me by calling me "old", when I would NEVER call him "short and fat?" Oh well, I try so hard to be his friend – and maybe someday that will happen!"
- November 13 – The FDA approves "Abilify MyCite", the first drug in the U.S. with a digital ingestion tracking system that records when the medication was taken, via a sensor embedded in the pill.
- November 14 – A gunman embarks on a shooting spree across Rancho Tehama, California, killing a total of four people and wounding twelve others before being shot and killed by police. He had earlier murdered his wife in their home.
- November 15 – The Trump administration announces that it will reverse a ban on elephant trophies from Africa, enacted by Barack Obama in 2014.
- November 17
  - The former President George HW Bush is accused by multiple women of groping them in the past.
  - Justice League, directed by Zack Snyder – with post-production direction by Joss Whedon – is released as the fifth film in the DC Extended Universe. Following its release, fans began to push for the release of Snyder's original version of the film. This version, Zack Snyder's Justice League, would later be released in 2021.
- November 19
  - The notorious killer and cult leader Charles Manson dies aged 83, after 46 years in prison.
  - Martin Truex Jr. wins his first ever Monster Energy NASCAR Cup Series championship at Homestead Miami Speedway.
- November 20 – It is alleged that Eric Trump funneled cancer charity money to his business.
- November 21 – CBS fires talk show host Charlie Rose after eight women accuse him of inappropriate behavior.
- November 22 – Pixar Animation Studios' 19th feature film, Coco, is released in theaters.
- November 27 – Matt Lauer, one of the most famous TV news anchors in the US, is fired from NBC following accusations of sexual assault.
- November 29 – President Trump's Twitter account retweets three inflammatory videos from far-right group, Britain First.
- November 30 – It is reported that, during the summer, President Trump tried to pressure a number of top Republicans to end the Senate investigation into Russia's interference in the 2016 election.

=== December ===
- December 1 – President Trump's ex-national security adviser Michael Flynn is charged with making a false statement to the FBI in January.
- December 2
  - The Senate passes the Tax Cuts and Jobs Act of 2017, the most sweeping overhaul of the US tax code since the Reagan era.
  - Emails, interviews and court documents involving senior Trump transition team officials, reported by The New York Times, suggest that Michael Flynn did not act alone, both before and after he spoke with Russian ambassador, Sergey Kislyak.
- December 4
  - President Trump announces an 85% cut to Utah's 1.3m acre Bears Ears National Monument and a 50% cut to the 1.9m acre Grand Staircase–Escalante National Monument, angering Native American tribes and environmental groups.
  - The Supreme Court allows President Trump's travel ban on six mainly Muslim countries to go fully into effect.
- December 6 – In a speech at the White House, President Trump announces that the US now recognizes Jerusalem as Israel's capital.
- December 7 – A magnitude 4 earthquake happens in California.
- December 8 – A state of emergency is declared in California as the worst wildfires on record devastate homes and businesses in the region, forcing the evacuation of 200,000 people.
- December 11 – A man is arrested after an explosion at New York's Port Authority Bus Terminal, described by Mayor Bill de Blasio as an "attempted terrorist attack".
- December 12 – Democrat Doug Jones defeats Republican candidate Roy Moore to win the Senate seat for Alabama, the first time a Democrat has won the state since 1992.
- December 13 – The Federal Reserve raises interest rates by a quarter percentage point, to a range of 1.25–1.5 percent, the third rise of 2017.
- December 14
  - Walt Disney announces that it will buy 21st Century Fox's entertainment assets for $52.4bn, ending more than half a century of media expansion by Rupert Murdoch.
  - Despite strong public opposition, the Federal Communications Commission (FCC) votes to repeal net neutrality.
- December 15
  - The Washington Post reports that staff at the Centers for Disease Control and Prevention (CDC) have been forbidden by the Trump administration from using the words "vulnerable", "entitlement", "diversity", "transgender", "fetus", "evidence-based" and "science-based" in any official documents being prepared for next year's budget.
  - Star Wars: The Last Jedi is released in theaters.
- December 16 – The Pentagon confirms the existence of the Advanced Aviation Threat Identification Program (AATIP), a secret investigatory effort funded from 2007 to 2012 by the United States government to study unexplained aerial phenomena (and/or unidentified flying objects).
- December 18
  - President Trump announces that climate change will be dropped from a list of national security threats.
  - 2017 Washington train derailment: An Amtrak train derails and crashes onto Interstate 5 near DuPont, Washington, leaving three dead.
  - John Skipper resigns as president of ESPN to deal with his substance addiction. Former network president and executive chairman George Bodenheimer is announced as the acting chairman for the next 90 days until a replacement is found.
- December 19 – The FDA approves Luxturna, the first gene therapy for an inherited condition in the U.S., for patients with a form of retinal dystrophy.
- December 20 – The Greatest Showman is released in theaters.
- December 21
  - Papa John's founder John Schnatter steps down as CEO of the pizza restaurant chain and will be replaced by chief operating officer Steve Ritchie on January 1.
  - The National Center for Health Statistics reports that US life expectancy fell in 2016 for the second year running, the first time in more than half a century that such a consecutive decline has occurred. The drop, from 78.7 to 78.6, was reportedly driven by the worsening opioid crisis.
- December 22 – Everitt Aaron Jameson, a 25-year-old former marine, is arrested by the FBI on suspicion of planning a terror attack in the Pier 39 area of San Francisco over Christmas.
- December 31 – In American football, the Cleveland Browns finish their season with an 0–16 record, becoming the second team in history to do so after the 2008 Lions.
- Archview Investment Group LP, an institutional alternative investment firm founded in 2009, begins shutting down.

== Deaths ==
=== January ===
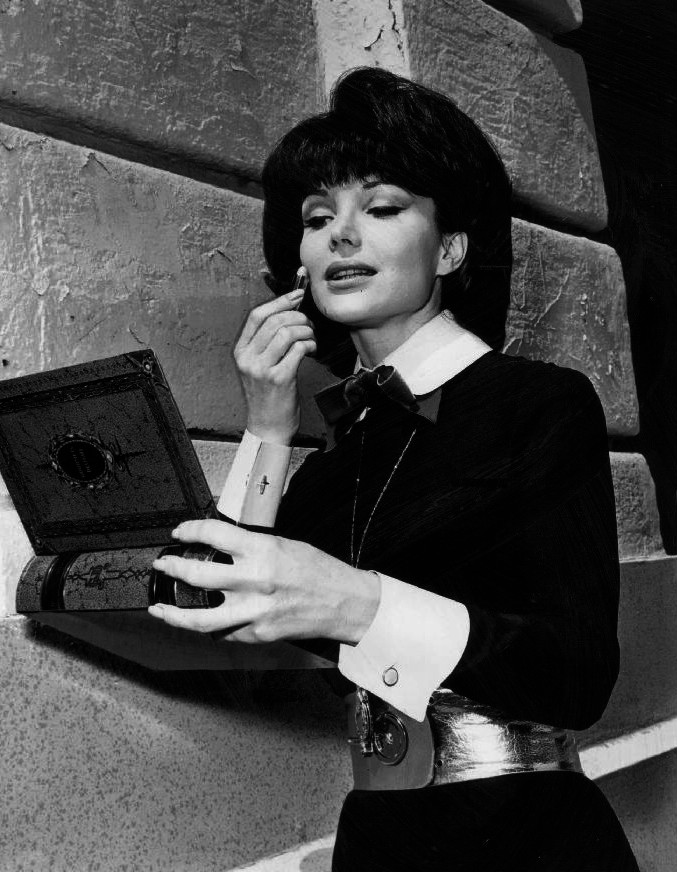
Francine York

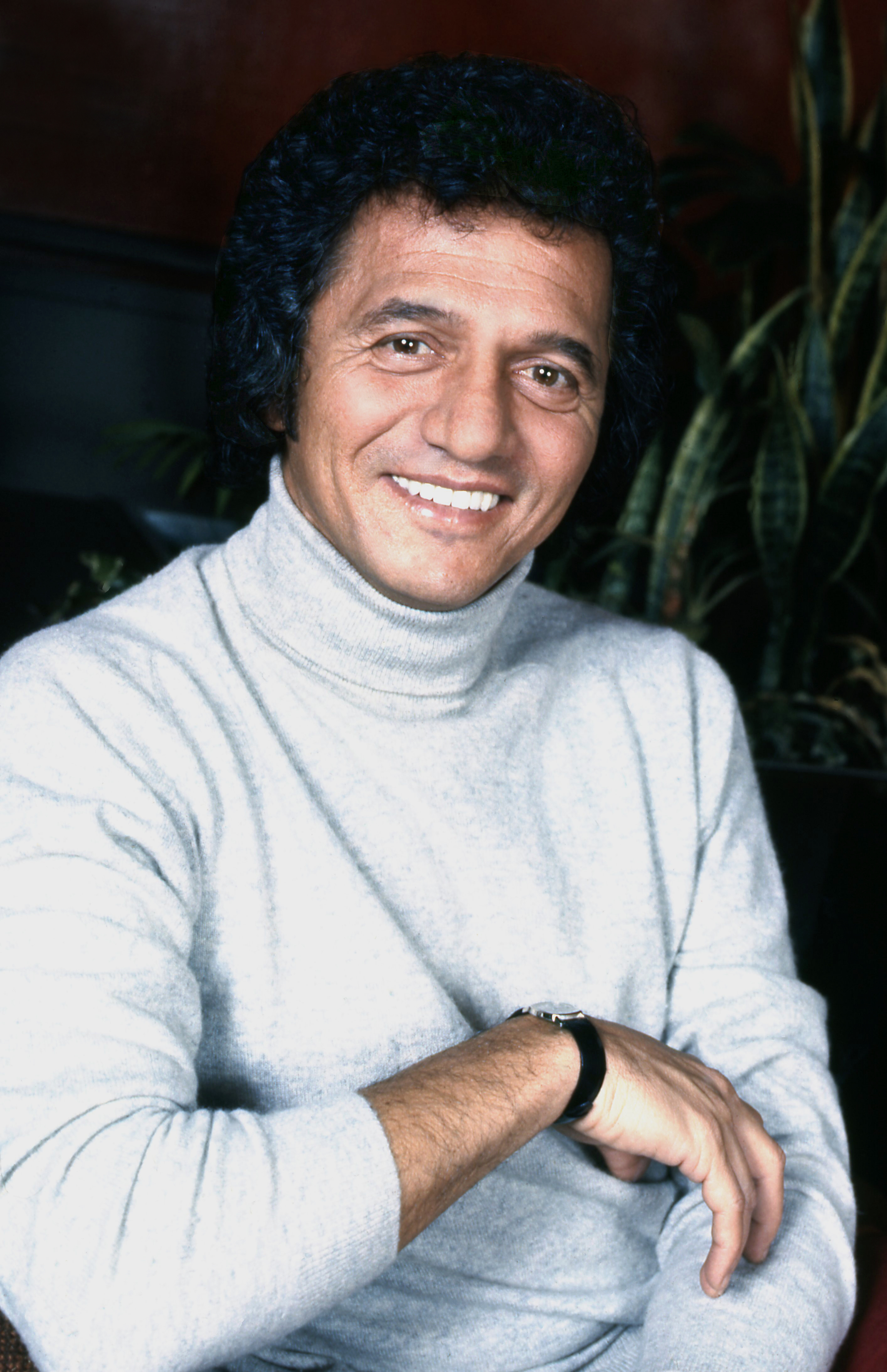
Buddy Greco

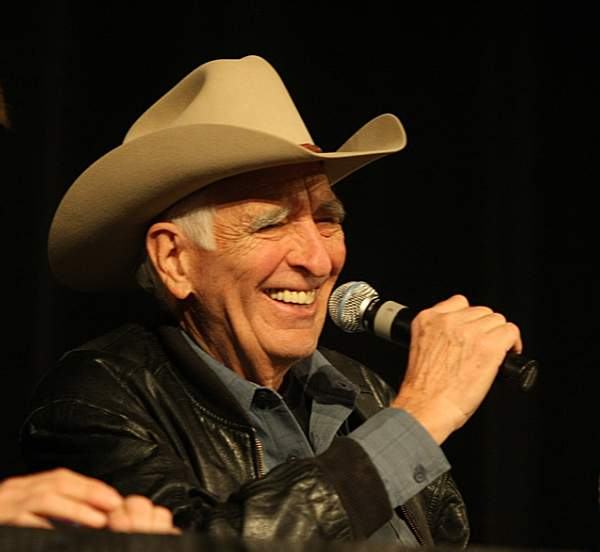
Tommy Allsup

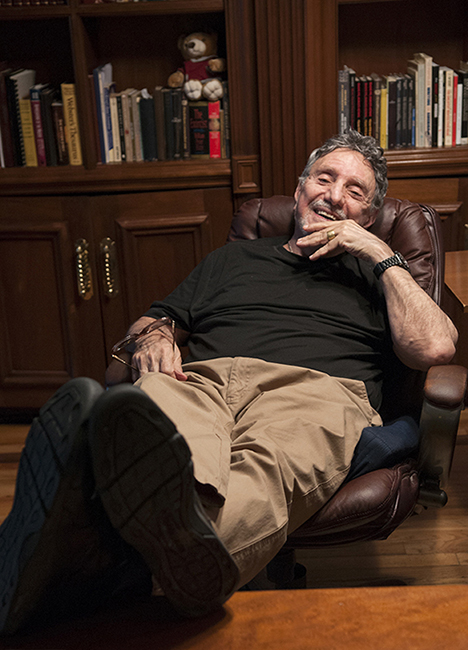
William Peter Blatty

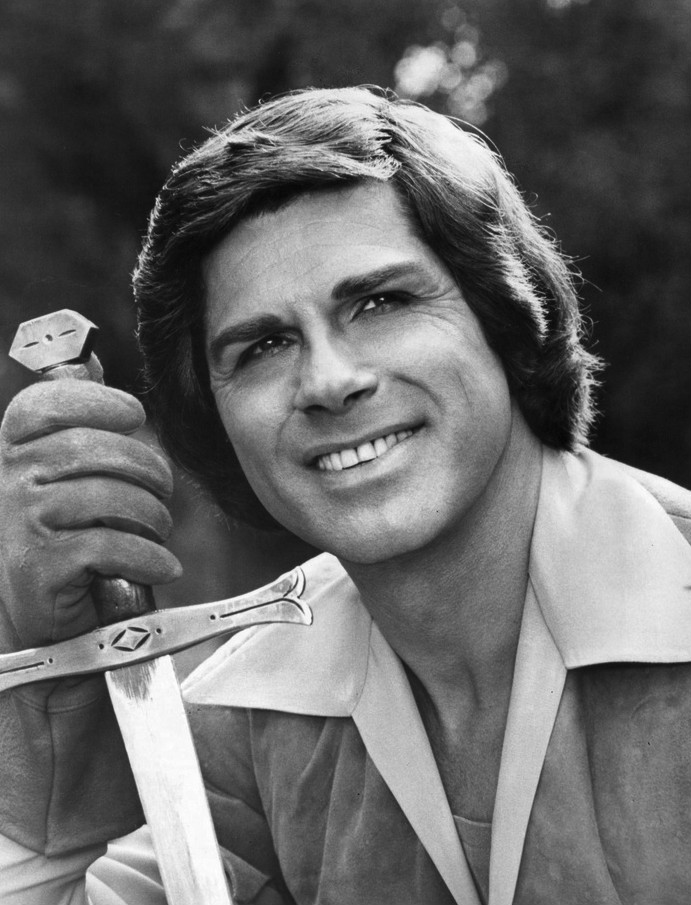
Dick Gautier

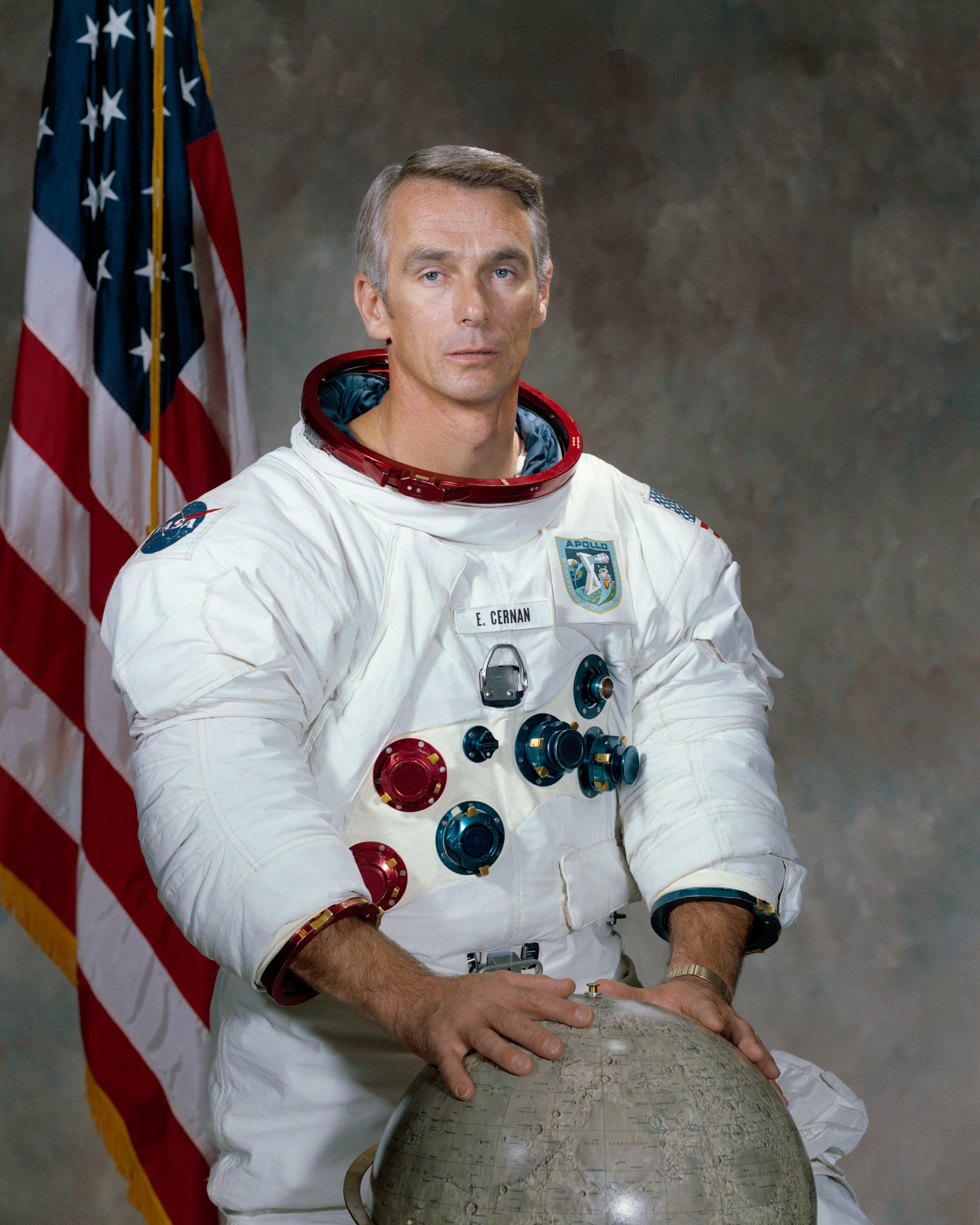
Eugene Cernan

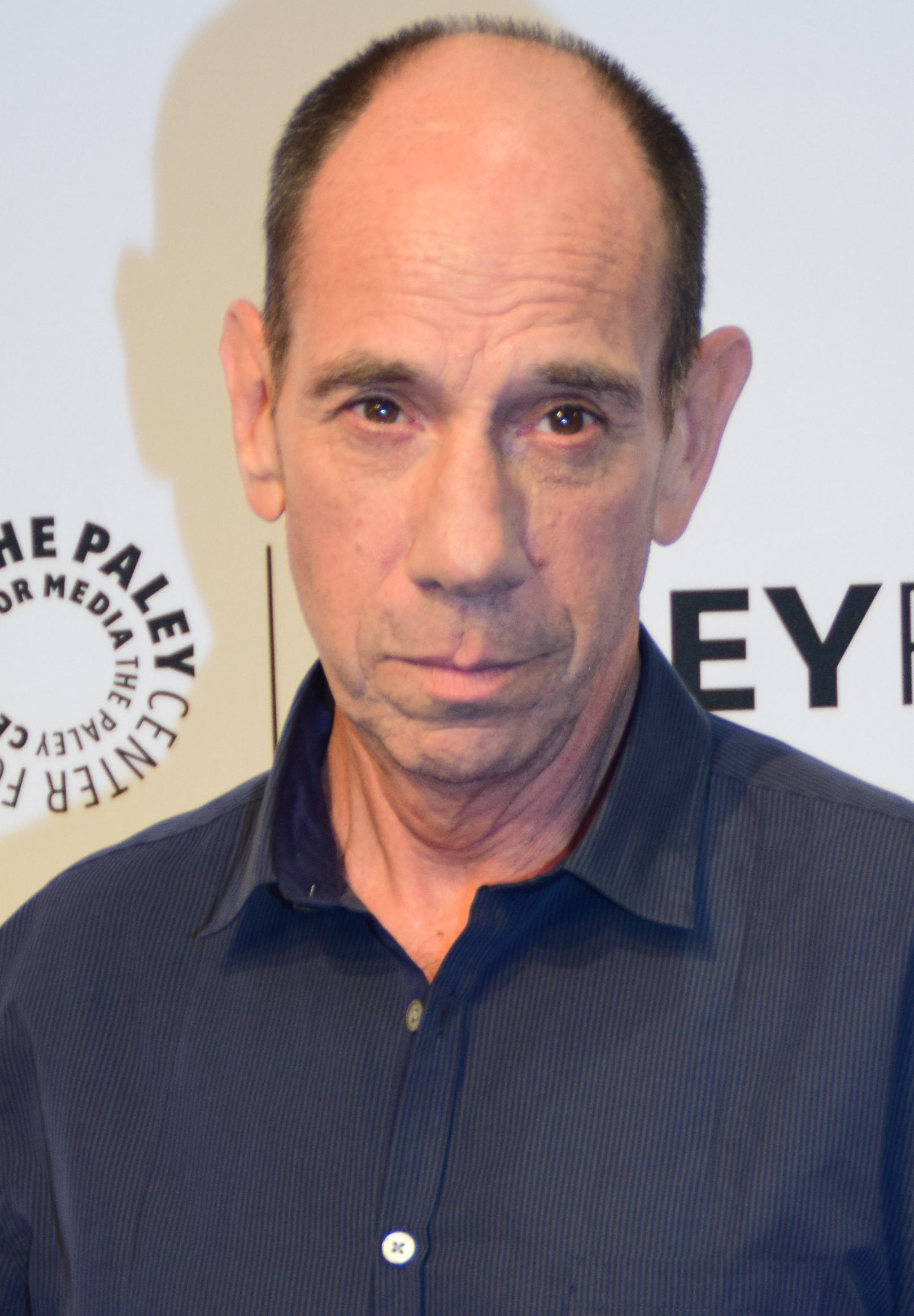
Miguel Ferrer

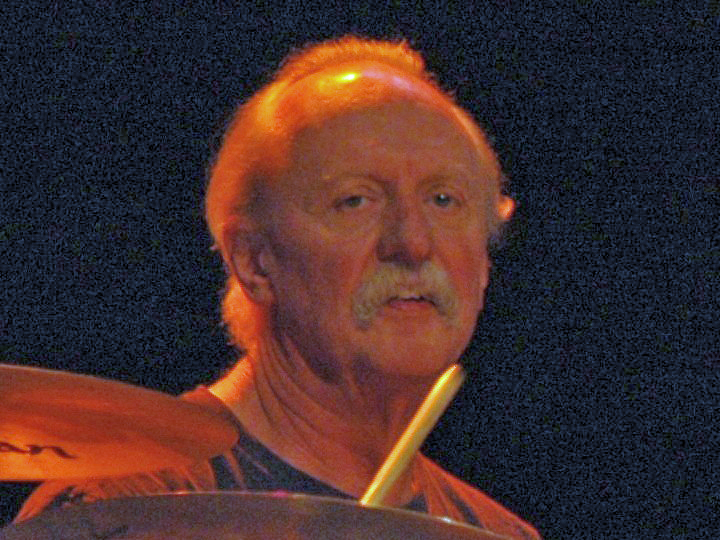
Butch Trucks

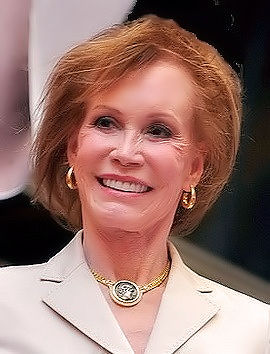
Mary Tyler Moore

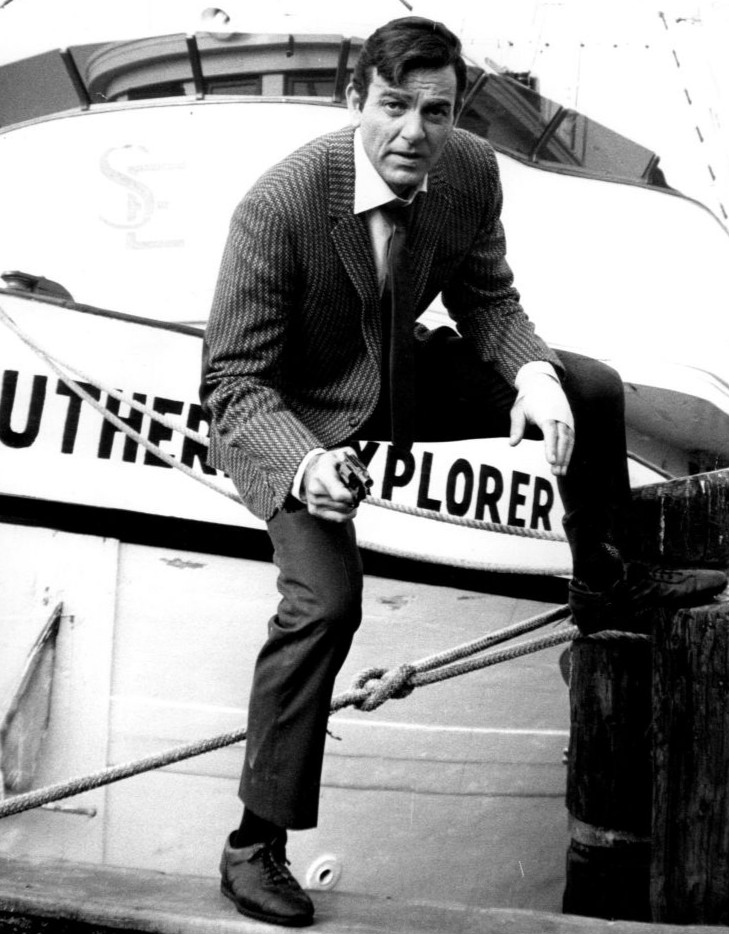
Mike Connors

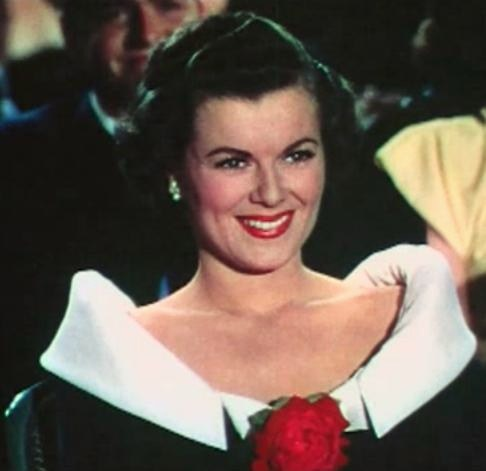
Barbara Hale

- January 1
  - Jewel Plummer Cobb, biologist, cancer researcher, and university president (b. 1924)
  - Jeremy Stone, scientist and activist (b. 1935)
  - Sylvester Uphus, farmer and politician (b. 1927)
- January 2
  - Albert Brewer, politician; 47th Governor of Alabama (1968–1971) (b. 1928)
  - Richard Machowicz, U.S. Navy SEAL and television personality (b. 1965)
  - Daryl Spencer, baseball player (b. 1928)
- January 3
  - Martin Brandtner, Marine Corps general (b. 1938)
  - Charles J. Colgan, businessman and politician (b. 1926)
  - J. Dewey Daane, economist (b. 1918)
  - George M. Dennison, university president (b. 1935)
  - Rosemary Stevenson, baseball player (b. 1936)
- January 4
  - Willie Evans, football player (b. 1937)
  - Bruce Hugo, politician (b. 1945)
  - Carl E. Misch, prosthodontist (b. 1947)
  - Art Pennington, baseball player (b. 1923)
- January 5
  - Paul Goble, English-born author and illustrator (b. 1933)
  - Stanley Russ, politician (b. 1930)
  - John Wightman, politician (b. 1938)
- January 6
  - Audrey Grevious, civil rights activist (b. 1930)
  - Greg Jelks, baseball player (b. 1961)
  - Les Lazarowitz, sound mixer (b. 1941)
  - Sylvester Potts, American singer and composer (b. 1938)
  - Bob Sadowski, baseball player (b. 1937)
  - Tilikum, American-held orca (b. ca. 1981)
  - Francine York, actress (b. 1930)
- January 7
  - Bill Champion baseball player (b. 1947)
  - John Deely, philosopher and semiotician (b. 1942)
  - Nat Hentoff, music critic, journalist, historian, and activist (b. 1925)
  - Eddie Kamae, musician and film producer (b. 1927)
  - Betty Lasky, film historian (b. 1922)
  - Mildred Meacham, baseball player (b. 1924)
  - Murray Ryan, politician (b. 1922)
  - Michael Scanlan, Roman Catholic priest and university administrator (b. 1931)
- January 8
  - Buddy Bregman, composer, arranger, conductor, and producer (b. 1930)
  - Jackie Brown, baseball player (b. 1943)
  - James C. Christensen, fantasy artist (b. 1942)
  - Miriam Goldberg, newspaper publisher (b. 1916)
  - Mary Ann Green, tribal leader and politician (b. 1964)
  - Roy Innis, civil rights activist (b. 1934)
  - Pioneer Cabin Tree, iconic tree in California
  - Eli Zelkha, Iranian-born entrepreneur (b. 1950)
- January 9
  - Rodney H. Brady, businessman and college president (b. 1933)
  - Charles Bragg, artist (b. 1931)
  - Crazy Toones, hip-hop record producer and DJ (b. 1971)
  - Patrick Flores, Roman Catholic prelate (b. 1929)
  - John Sailhamer, Evangelical Old Testament scholar (b. 1946)
  - Warren Allen Smith, humanist and gay rights activist (b. 1921)
  - Timothy Well, professional wrestler (b. 1961)
- January 10
  - Hiag Akmakjian, 91, author, painter and photographer (b. 1926)
  - Steve Fryar, 63, rodeo performer (b. 1953)
  - Buddy Greco, jazz and pop singer and pianist (b. 1926)
  - Steven McDonald, police detective (b. 1957)
  - Oliver Smithies, English-born geneticist and Nobel laureate (b. 1925)
- January 11
  - Tommy Allsup, rockabilly guitarist (b. 1931)
  - Henry Foner, social activist (b. 1919)
  - Conrad Hilberry, poet (b. 1928)
  - Victor Lownes, publishing executive and film producer (b. 1928)
  - Akio Takamori, Japanese-born sculptor (b. 1950)
- January 12
  - William Peter Blatty, novelist and screenwriter (b. 1928)
  - Milton Metz, radio and television personality (b. 1921)
  - Frank Spellman, weightlifter (b. 1922)
- January 13
  - Hans Berliner, German-born computer scientist and chess player (b. 1929)
  - Dick Gautier, actor, comedian, singer, and caricaturist (b. 1931)
  - Alan Jabbour, musician and folklorist (b. 1942)
  - David Modell, businessman and NFL executive (b. 1960)
  - Nicodemo Scarfo, mob boss (b. 1929)
- January 14
  - Alex Jones, Roman Catholic deacon (b. 1941)
  - Kevin Starr, historian (b. 1940)
- January 15
  - George Beall, attorney (b. 1937)
  - Ciel Bergman, painter (b. 1938)
  - Vicki Lansky, author and publisher (b. 1942)
  - Eddie Long, Baptist pastor (b. 1953)
  - David Poythress, politician (b. 1943)
  - Dale Smith, rodeo performer (b. 1928)
  - Jimmy Snuka, Fijian-born professional wrestler (b. 1943)
  - Greg Trooper, singer-songwriter and musician (b. 1956)
- January 16
  - Eugene Cernan, aviator and astronaut (b. 1934)
  - William A. Hilliard, journalist (b. 1927)
  - Dan O'Brien Sr., baseball executive (b. 1929)
  - Phyllis Harrison-Ross, psychiatrist (b. 1936)
  - Charles "Bobo" Shaw, jazz drummer (b. 1947)
  - Steve Wright, rock bassist
- January 17
  - Brenda C. Barnes, business executive (b. 1953)
  - Tirrel Burton, football player, coach, and broadcaster (b. 1929)
  - David P. Buckson, attorney and politician (b. 1920)
  - Colo, western gorilla (b. 1956)
  - Kenneth McNenny, rancher and politician (b. 1935)
  - Gene Olaff, soccer player (b. 1920)
  - Robert Timlin, federal judge (b. 1932)
- January 18
  - Red Adams, baseball player, scout, and coach (b. 1921)
  - David P. Buckson, lawyer and politician, 63rd Governor of Delaware (b. 1920)
  - Yuji Ijiri, 81, Japanese-born accounting academic (b. 1935)
  - Lucy Killea, politician (b. 1922)
  - William Margold, pornographic film actor and director (b. 1943)
  - Lawrence S. Margolis, federal judge (b. 1935)
  - Harry Minor, baseball player, manager, and scout (b. 1928)
  - Roberta Peters, coloratura soprano (b. 1930)
  - Dick Starr, baseball player (b. 1921)
- January 19
  - Wayne Barrett, journalist (b. 1945)
  - Miguel Ferrer, actor (b. 1955)
  - Craig Howard, football player and coach (b. 1952)
  - Edwin Pope, journalist (b. 1928)
  - Walt Streuli, baseball player (b. 1935)
  - James S. Vlasto, public servant (b. 1934)
  - Wayne Barrett, journalist (b. 1945)
- January 20
  - Jack August, historian (b. 1954)
  - Bill Fischer, football player (b. 1927)
  - Michael Goldberg, sports executive (b. 1943)
  - Alec Devon Kreider, convicted murderer (b. 1991)
  - Charles Liteky, military chaplain and peace activist (b. 1931)
  - Harry J. Middleton, writer and library director (b. 1921)
  - Joey Powers, singer-songwriter (b. 1934)
  - Chuck Stewart, jazz photographer (b. 1927)
  - Tommy Tate, soul singer and songwriter (b. 1944)
- January 21
  - Byron Dobell, editor and writer (b. 1927)
  - Karl Hendricks, singer, songwriter and guitarist (b. 1970)
  - José de Jesús Madera Uribe, Roman Catholic prelate (b. 1927)
  - Walter Morrison, Hall of Fame musician and record producer (b. 1954)
  - William Albert Norris, judge (b. 1927)
  - Maggie Roche, singer-songwriter (b. 1951)
  - Ken Wright, baseball player (b. 1946)
- January 22 – Evelyn Kawamoto, swimmer (b. 1933)
- January 23
  - J. S. G. Boggs, artist (b. 1955)
  - Earl Foreman, lawyer and sports executive (b. 1924)
  - Bobby Freeman, singer and songwriter (b. 1940)
  - Ralph Guglielmi, football player (b. 1933)
  - Leon Katz, playwright (b. 1919)
  - Bernard Redmont, journalist (b. 1918)
  - Anatol Roshko, physicist and engineer (b. 1923)
  - Ruth Samuelson, politician (b. 1959)
  - Marvell Thomas, keyboardist (b. 1941)
  - Mary Webster, actress (b. 1935)
- January 24
  - Chuck Canfield, businessman and politician (b. 1932)
  - Robert Folsom, politician (b. 1927)
  - Martin Nicholas Lohmuller, Roman Catholic prelate (b. 1919)
  - Gil Ray, drummer (b. 1956)
  - Butch Trucks, drummer (b. 1947)
  - Chuck Weyant, racecar driver (b. 1923)
- January 25
  - William Lacy Carter, politician (b. 1925)
  - Ann Dandrow, politician (b. 1936)
  - Robert Garcia, politician (b. 1933)
  - Kevin Geer, actor (b. 1952)
  - Harry Mathews, novelist and poet (b. 1930)
  - Jack Mendelsohn, cartoonist and screenwriter (b. 1926)
  - Mary Tyler Moore, actress (b. 1936)
- January 26
  - Mike Connors, actor (b. 1925)
  - Hal Geer, 100, producer and filmmaker (b. 1916)
  - Barbara Hale, 94, actress (b. 1922)
  - Leonard Linkow, dentist and pioneer in oral implantology (b. 1926)
  - Charles Recher, artist (b. 1950)
- January 27
  - Stan Boreson, comedian and television host (b. 1925)
  - Bob Bowman, baseball player (b. 1930)
  - Bob Holiday, actor (b. 1932)
  - Robert Ellis Miller, film director (b. 1927)
  - Arthur H. Rosenfeld, physicist (b. 1926)
  - Charles Shackleford, basketball player (b. 1966)
  - Jack Thrasher, immunotoxicologist (b. 1938)
  - Gwen Gillen, sculptor and artist (b. 1941)
- January 28
  - Guitar Gable, blues musician (b. 1937)
  - Charles LeMaistre, academic administrator (b. 1924)
  - John N. Mather, mathematician (b. 1942)
  - Bharati Mukherjee, Indian-born writer and academic (b. 1940)
  - Sterling Newberry, inventor (b. 1915)
  - Anthony J. Perpich, politician (b. 1932)
  - Richard Portman, sound mixer (b. 1934)
  - William Schwarzer, federal judge (b. 1925)
  - Dan Spiegle, comic book artist (b. 1920)
  - Stuart Timmons, gay historian and activist (b. 1957)
- January 29
  - Howard Frank Mosher, author (b. 1942)
  - William Owens, Navy SEAL soldier (b. 1981)
  - Leonard H. Perroots, military officer (b. 1933)
  - Elliot Sperling, historian (b. 1951)
- January 30
  - Dore Ashton, 89, writer and critic (b. 1928)
  - Marta Becket, 92, dancer (b. 1924)
  - Don Coleman, 88, football player (b. 1928)
  - Carmen Contreras-Bozak, World War II veteran and the first Hispanic member of the Women's Army Corps. (b. 1919)
  - Doris Lockness, aviation pioneer (b. 1910)
  - Harold Rosen, electrical engineer (b. 1926)
- January 31
  - Thomas Barlow, politician (b. 1940)
  - Trice Harvey, politician (b. 1936)
  - Frank Pellegrino, actor and restaurateur (b. 1944)
  - David Shepard, film preservationist (b. 1940)
  - Bobby Watson, 86, basketball player (b. 1930)

=== February ===
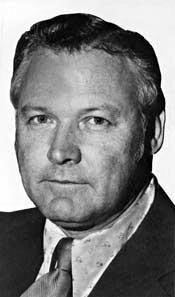
Alvin Baldus

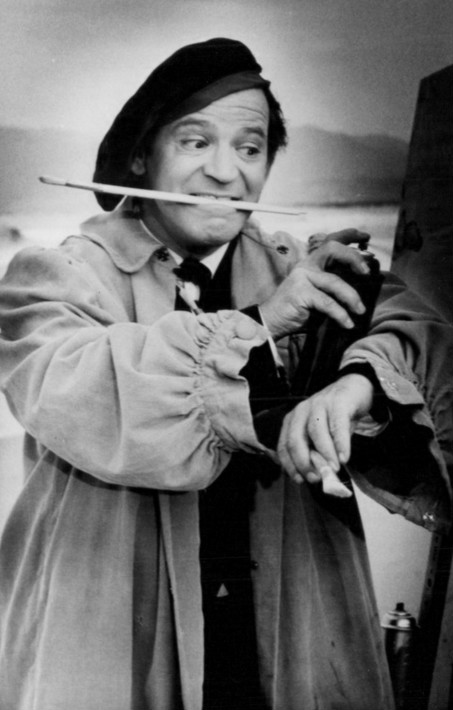
Irwin Corey

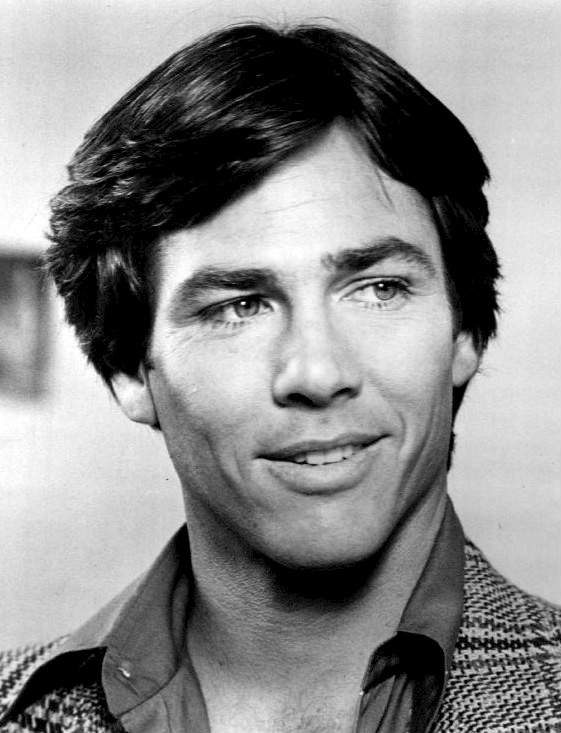
Richard Hatch

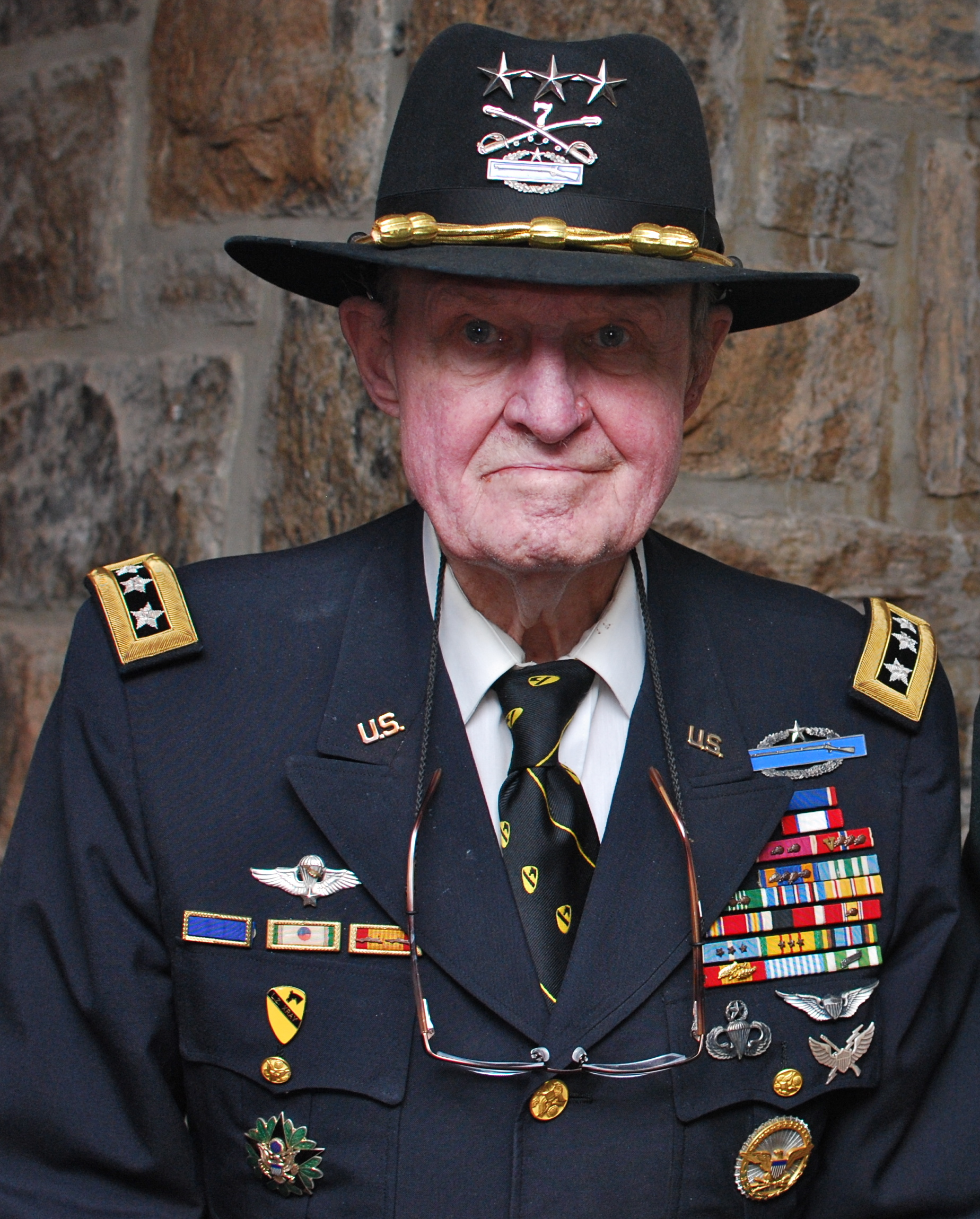
Hal Moore

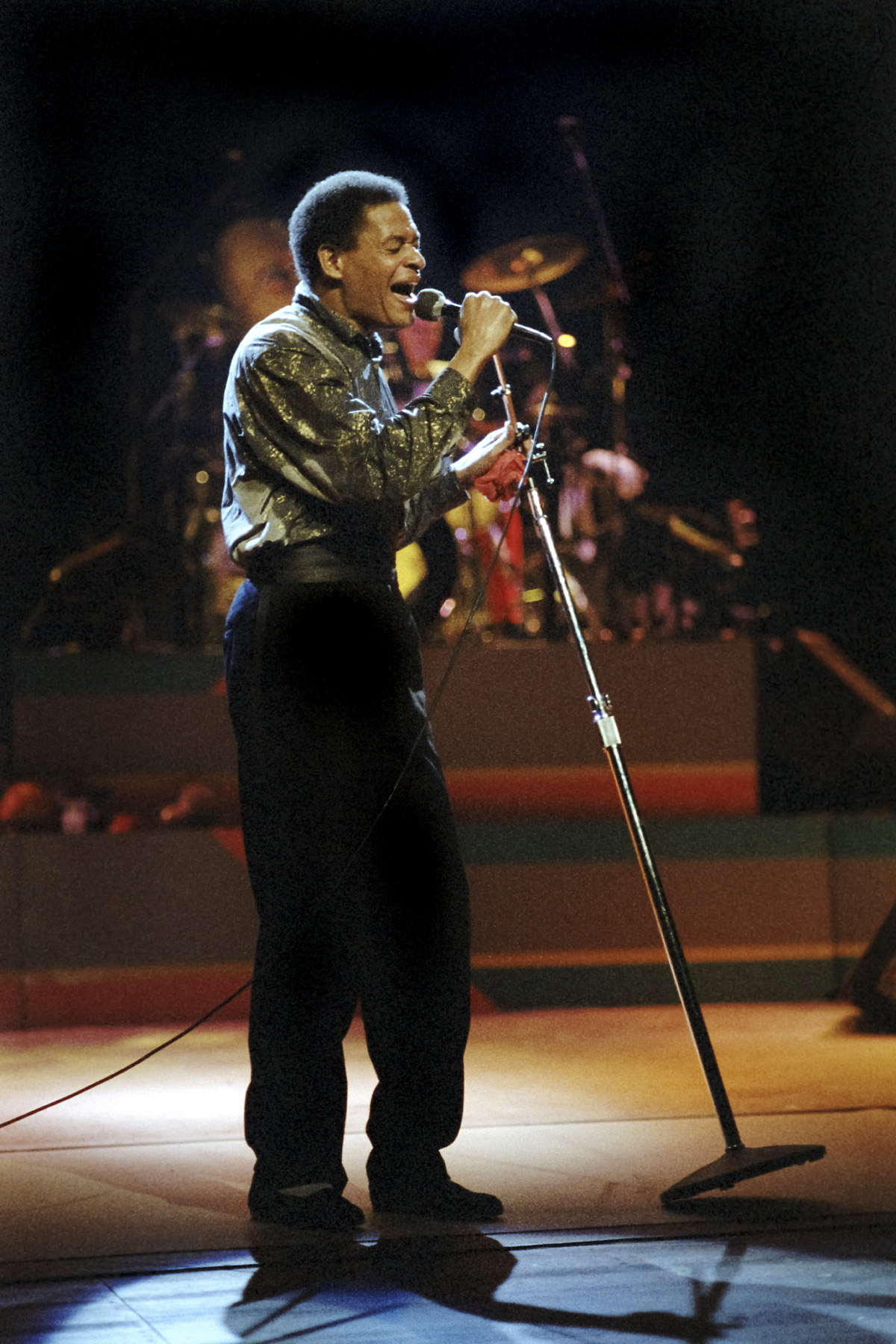
Al Jarreau

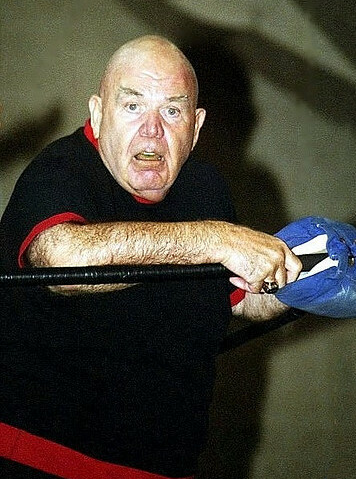
George Steele

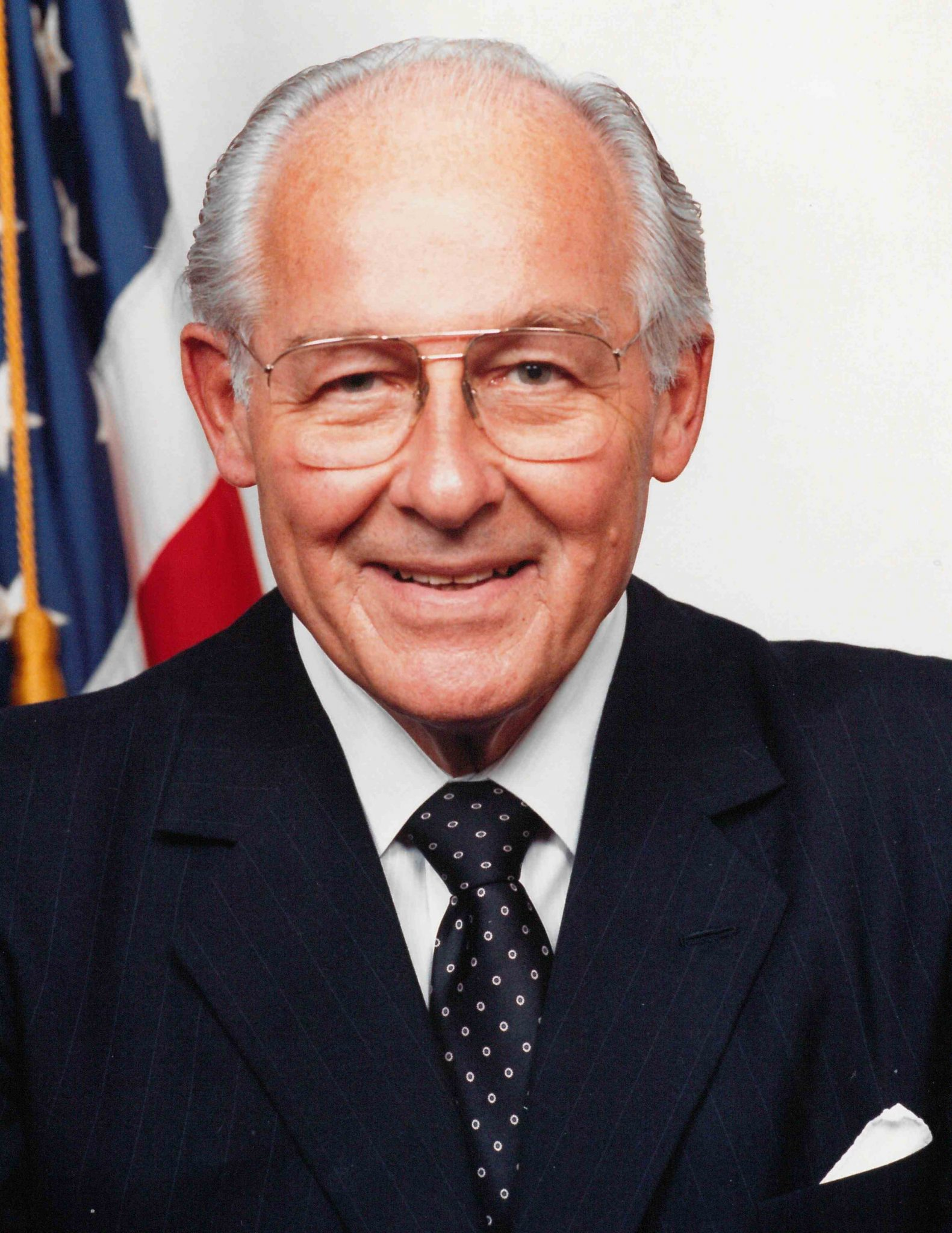
Robert H. Michel

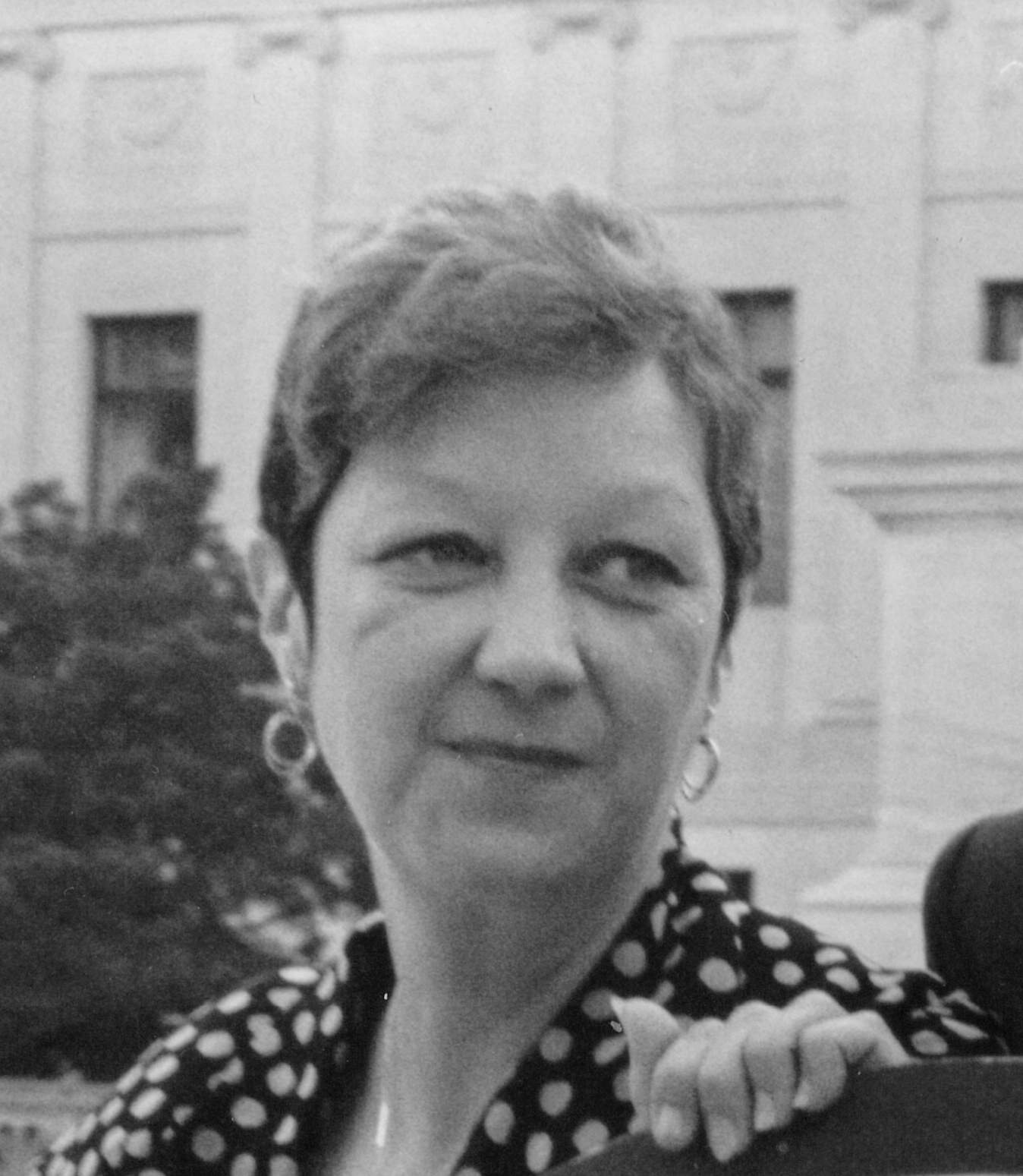
Norma McCorvey

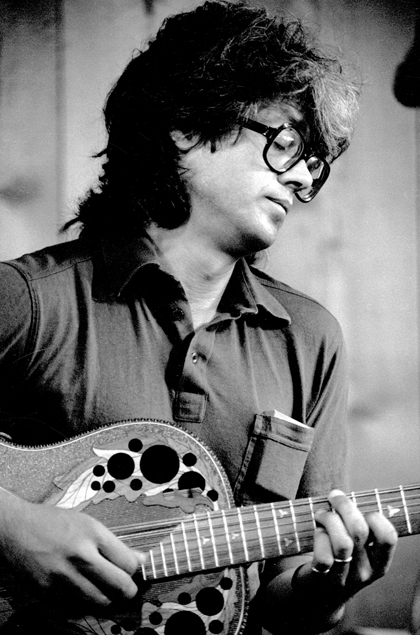
Larry Coryell

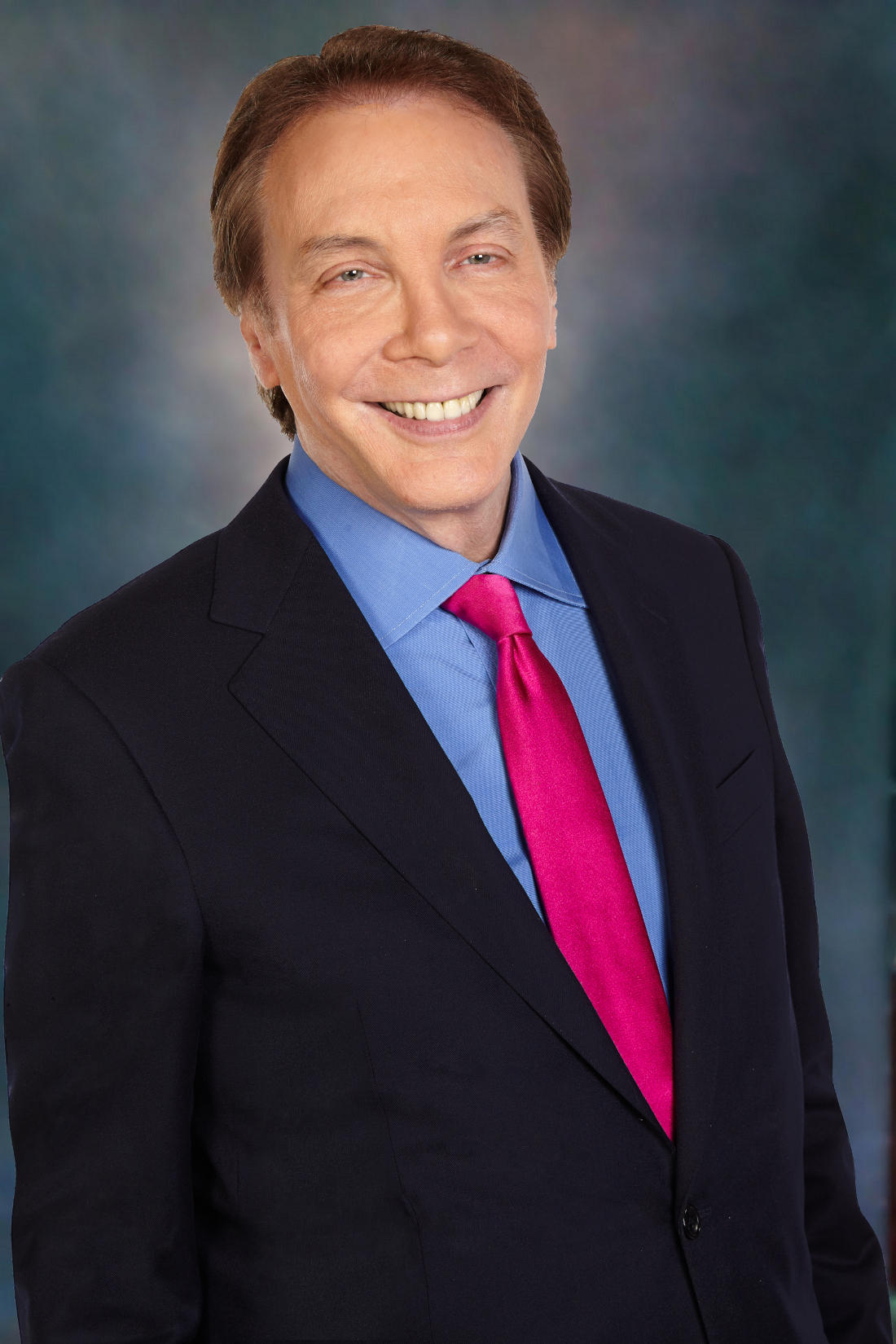
Alan Colmes

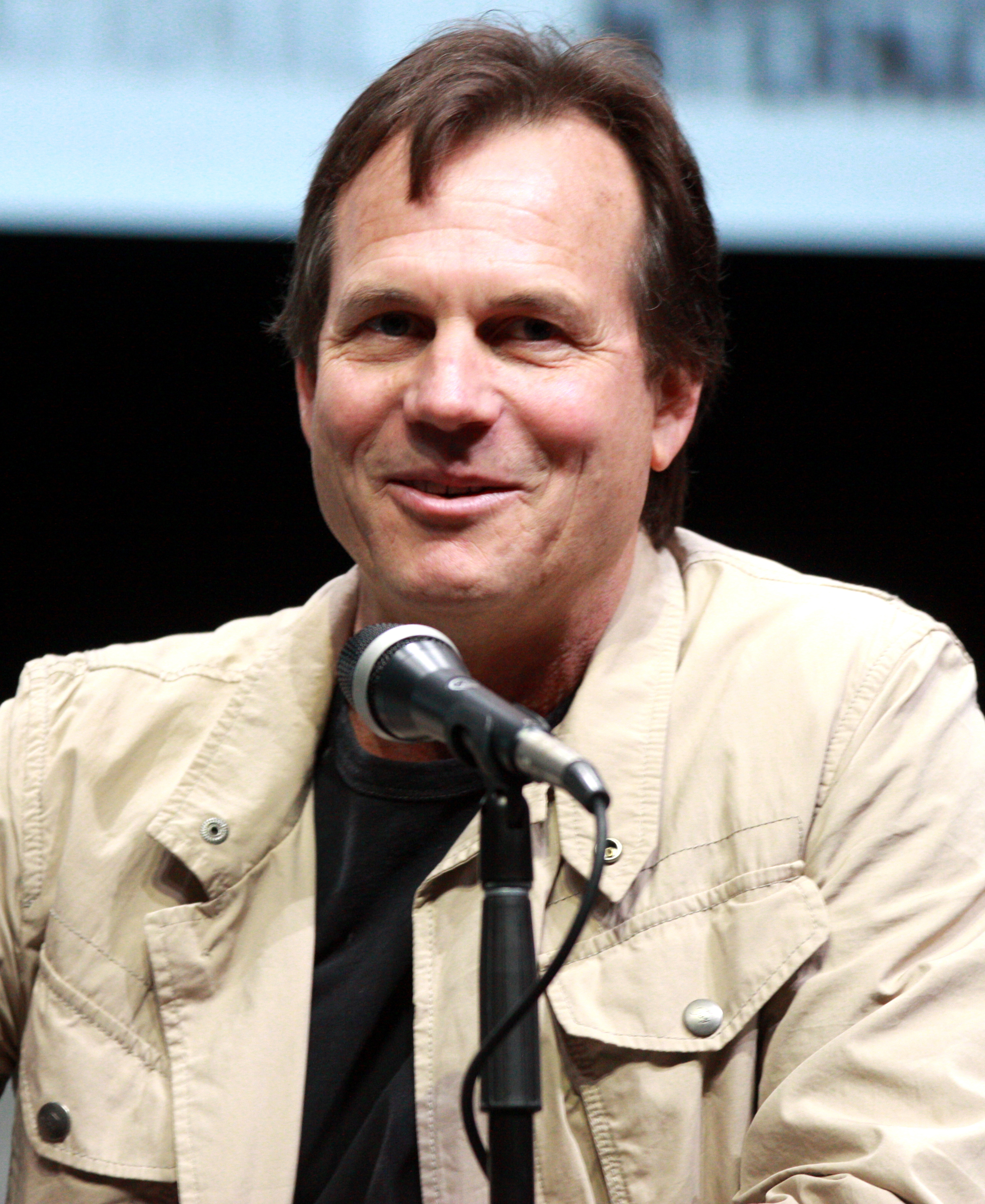
Bill Paxton

- February 1
  - Anne Arrasmith, artist and curator (b. 1946)
  - Mark Brownson, baseball player (b. 1975)
  - William Melvin Kelley, novelist (b. 1937)
  - Carter Manny, architect (b. 1918)
  - Edward Tipper, World War II veteran (b. 1921)
  - David Peter Battaglia, politician and educator (b. 1931)
- February 2
  - Alvin Baldus, politician (b. 1926)
  - Tom Drake, wrestler and politician (b. 1930)
  - John Hilton, football player (b. 1942)
  - George Maderos, football player (b. 1933)
  - Perry McGriff, football player and politician (b. 1937)
  - Jeff Sauer, ice hockey coach (b. 1943)
  - Seymour Jonathan Singer, 92, cell biologist (b. 1924)
- February 3
  - Marjorie Corcoran, particle physicist (b. 1950)
  - Anthony French, English-born physicist (b. 1920)
  - Joseph Green, academic and theatre producer (b. 1934)
  - John M. Hayes, geochemist (b. 1940)
  - Benny Perrin, football player (b. 1959)
  - Don Trousdell, artist
- February 4
  - John Howes, professor of Asian studies (b. 1924)
  - Marc Spitz, writer and music journalist (b. 1969)
- February 5
  - David Axelrod, arranger, composer and producer (b. 1933)
  - Ray Christensen, sportscaster (b. 1924)
  - Sonny Geraci, singer (b. 1946)
  - Thomas Lux, poet (b. 1946)
- February 6
  - Irwin Corey, comedian (b. 1914)
  - Marc Drogin, writer and illustrator (b. 1936)
  - Neil Gehrels, 64, astronomer (b. 1952)
  - Stan Jones, politician (b. 1949)
  - Mary Ann Knowles, politician (b. 1946)
  - Raymond Smullyan, mathematician and philosopher (b. 1919)
  - Christine Dolce, MySpace celebrity and cosmetologist (b. 1981)
- February 7
  - Pat Beard, politician (b. 1947)
  - Joanne Brekke, politician (b. 1935).
  - Richard Hatch, actor (b. 1945)
  - Sidney H. Liebson, scientist (b. 1920)
- February 8
  - Richard DuFour, educational researcher (b. 1947)
  - Arthur Hyman, academic (b. 1921)
- February 9
  - Marcel Dandeneau, 85, politician (b. 1931)
  - Barbara Gelb, biographer, playwright and journalist (b. 1926)
  - Packy, Asian elephant (b. 1962)
  - Warren Unna, journalist (b. 1923)
- February 10
  - Roger Boas, politician (b. 1921)
  - Albert Boscov, businessman (b. 1929)
  - Edward Bryant, science fiction and horror writer (b. 1945)
  - H. R. Crawford, real estate developer and politician (b. 1939)
  - Maxine Grimm, religious figure (b. 1914)
  - Mike Ilitch, businessman (b. 1929)
  - Dahlov Ipcar, painter and author (b. 1917)
  - Hal Moore, lieutenant general and author (b. 1922)
  - Royal Delta, racehorse (b. 2008)
- February 11
  - Bruno A. Boley, Italian-born engineer (b. 1924)
  - Jeremy Geathers, arena football player (b. 1986)
  - Chavo Guerrero Sr., professional wrestler (b. 1949)
  - Harvey Lichtenstein, arts administrator (b. 1929)
- February 12
  - Dave Adolph, football coach (b. 1937)
  - Jay Bontatibus, actor (b. 1964)
  - Barbara Carroll, jazz pianist (b. 1925)
  - Al Jarreau, jazz and R&B singer (b. 1940)
  - Quentin Moses, football player (b. 1983)
  - Clint Roberts, politician (b. 1935)
- February 13
  - Stacy Bromberg, darts player (b. 1956)
  - Melvin Defleur, mass communications scholar (b. 1923)
  - Bruce Lansbury, British-born television producer and screenwriter (b. 1930)
  - Lucky Pulpit, racehorse (b. 2001)
  - Darrell K. Smith, football player (b. 1961)
- February 14 – Joseph Neal, politician (b. 1950)
- February 15
  - E-Dubble, rap artist (b. 1982)
  - Rich Ingold, arena football player and coach (b. 1963)
  - Loren Wiseman, game designer (b. 1951)
- February 16
  - George Steele, professional wrestler and actor (b. 1937)
  - Duke Washington, football player (b. 1933)
- February 17
  - Charles L. Bartlett, journalist (b. 1921)
  - Nicole Bass, bodybuilder, professional wrestler and actress (b. 1964)
  - Warren Frost, actor (b. 1925)
  - Theodore J. Lowi, political scientist (b. 1931)
  - Robert H. Michel, politician (b. 1923)
  - Leonard Myers, football player (b. 1978)
  - Michael Novak, Roman Catholic theologian (b. 1933)
  - Tom Regan, philosopher and animal rights advocate (b. 1938)
  - Andrew Schneider, journalist (b. 1942)
  - Jerome Tuccille, writer and activist (b. 1937)
  - Magnus Wenninger, mathematician (b. 1919)
- February 18
  - Nick Dupree, 34, disability rights activist (b. 1982)
  - Tom Larson, politician (b. 1948)
  - Norma McCorvey, political activist, plaintiff in U.S. Supreme Court case Roe v. Wade (b. 1947)
  - Richard Schickel, film critic (b. 1933)
  - Lawrence F. Snowden, military officer (b. 1921)
  - Clyde Stubblefield, drummer (b. 1943)
- February 19
  - Charismatic, racehorse (b. 1996)
  - Richard J. Coffee, politician (b. 1925)
  - Larry Coryell, jazz guitarist (b. 1943)
  - Karla M. Gray, judge (b. 1947)
  - Darryl Hammond, arena football player (b. 1967)
  - John S. Wold, politician (b. 1916)
  - Marilyn B. Young, historian (b. 1937)
- February 20
  - Ilene Berns, record executive (b. 1943)
  - Brenda Buttner, news correspondent (b. 1961)
  - Mildred Dresselhaus, nanotechnologist (b. 1930)
  - Jamie Fox, government official and political strategist (b. 1954)
- February 21
  - Kenneth Arrow, economist (b. 1921)
  - Douglas Coe, evangelical leader (b. 1928)
  - Edwin Kessler, atmospheric scientist (b. 1928)
  - Stanisław Skrowaczewski, Polish-born conductor and composer (b. 1923)
- February 22
  - Ed Garvey, labor attorney (b. 1940)
  - J. Karl Hedrick, mechanical engineer (b. 1944)
  - Ralph A. Loveys, politician (b. 1929)
- February 23
  - Ward Chamberlin, public broadcasting executive (b. 1921)
  - Alan Colmes, political commentator (b. 1950)
  - Bernie Custis, CFL player (b. 1928)
  - David Keightley, sinologist (b. 1932)
  - Leon Ware, musician, record producer, and songwriter (b. 1940)
- February 24
  - Daryl, magician (b. 1955)
  - Ronald T. Halverson, religious leader and politician (b. 1936)
  - Fred Oldfield, painter (b. 1918)
- February 25
  - Scott Lew, screenwriter (b. 1968)
  - Eric Miller, record producer (b. 1941)
  - Bill Paxton, actor (b. 1955)
  - Chez Pazienza, journalist, author and television producer (b. 1969)
  - Jack Pope, judge, attorney and author (b. 1913)
  - Dorothy P. Rice, economist (b. 1922)
  - Boaz Vaadia, Israeli-born sculptor (b. 1951)
- February 26
  - Jay Cronley, writer (b. 1943)
  - Eugene Garfield, linguist (b. 1925)
  - Ned Garver, baseball pitcher (b. 1925)
  - Sunny Hale, polo player (b. 1968)
  - Joseph Wapner, judge and television personality (b. 1919)
- February 27 – John Harlan, radio and television personality (b. 1925)
- February 28
  - Spencer Hays, art collector (b. 1936)
  - Marian Javits, arts patron (b. 1925)
  - Paul Kangas, broadcaster (b. 1937)
  - Ric Marlow, songwriter (b. 1925)
  - Joseph A. Panuska, educator (b. 1927)
  - Dave Rosenfield, baseball manager (b. 1929)

=== March ===
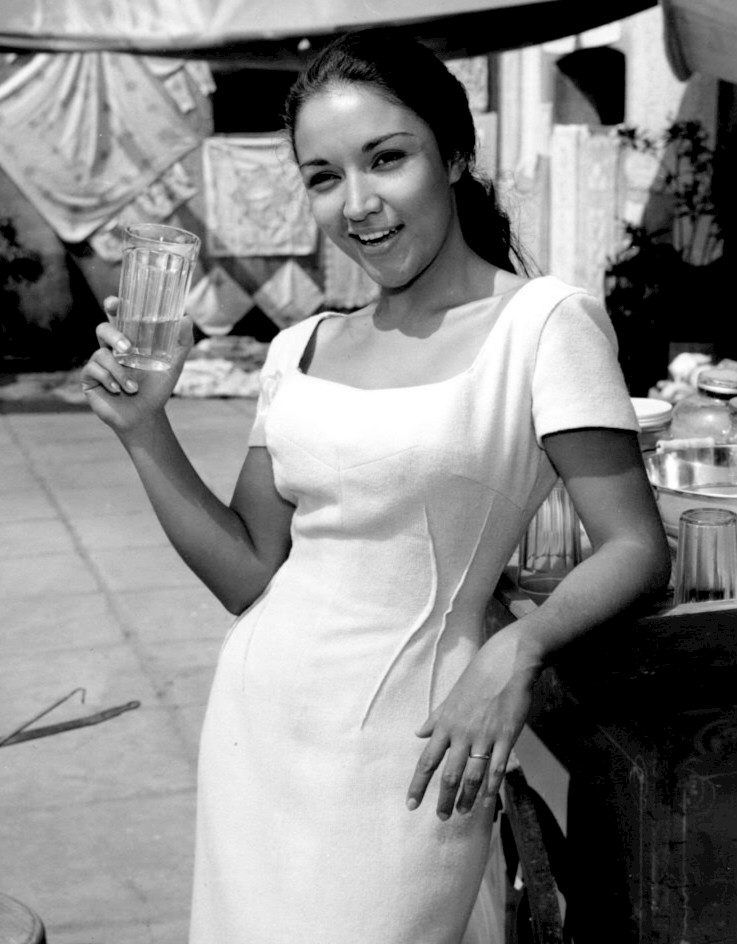
Míriam Colón

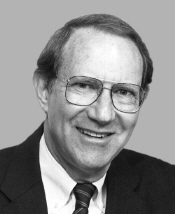
Anthony C. Beilenson

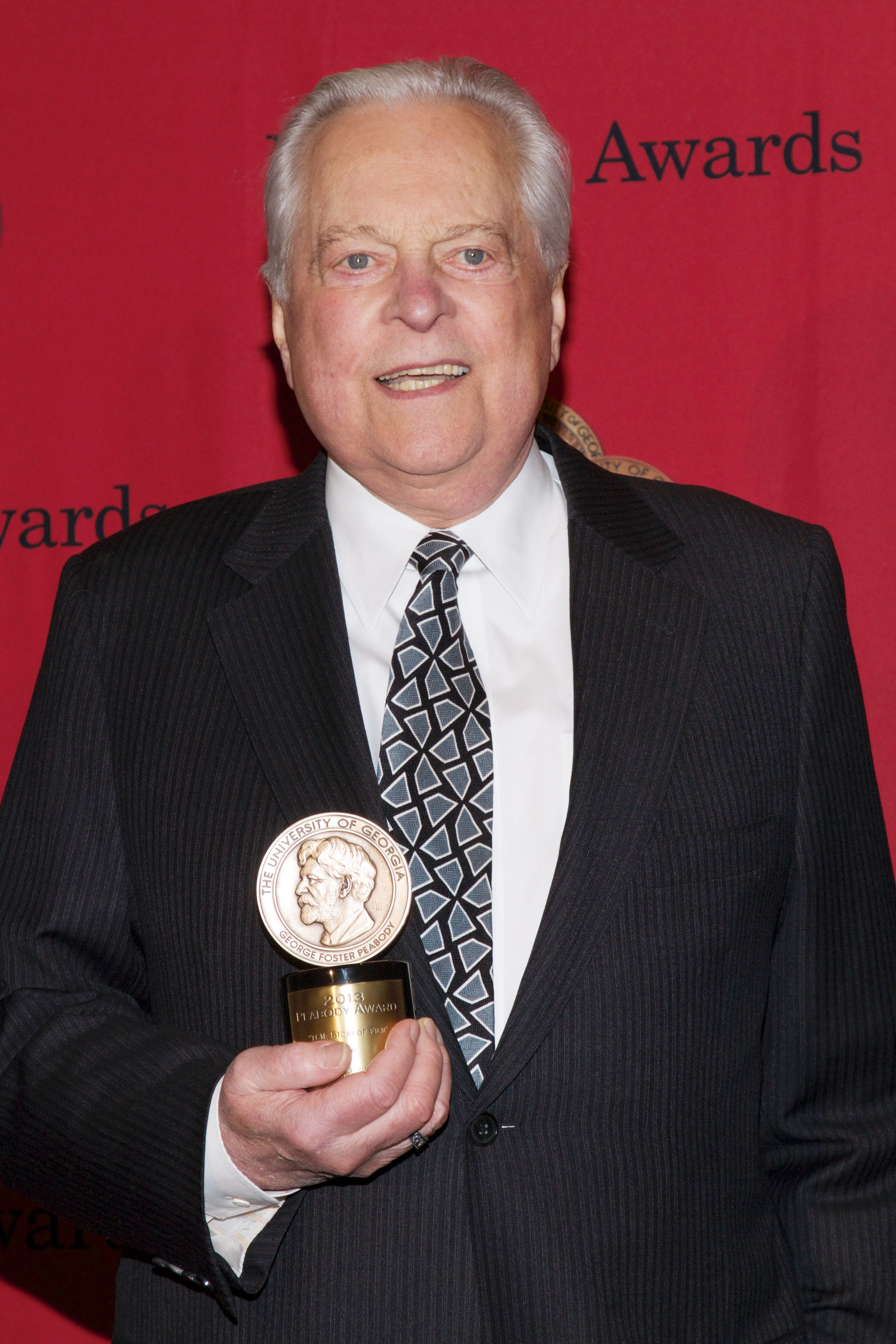
Robert Osborne

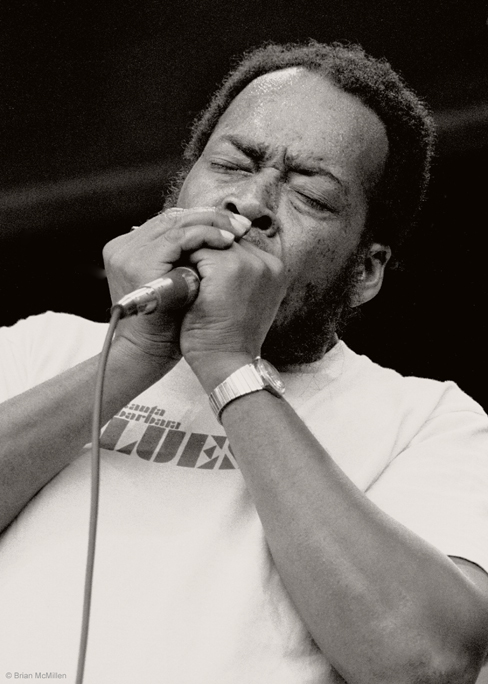
James Cotton

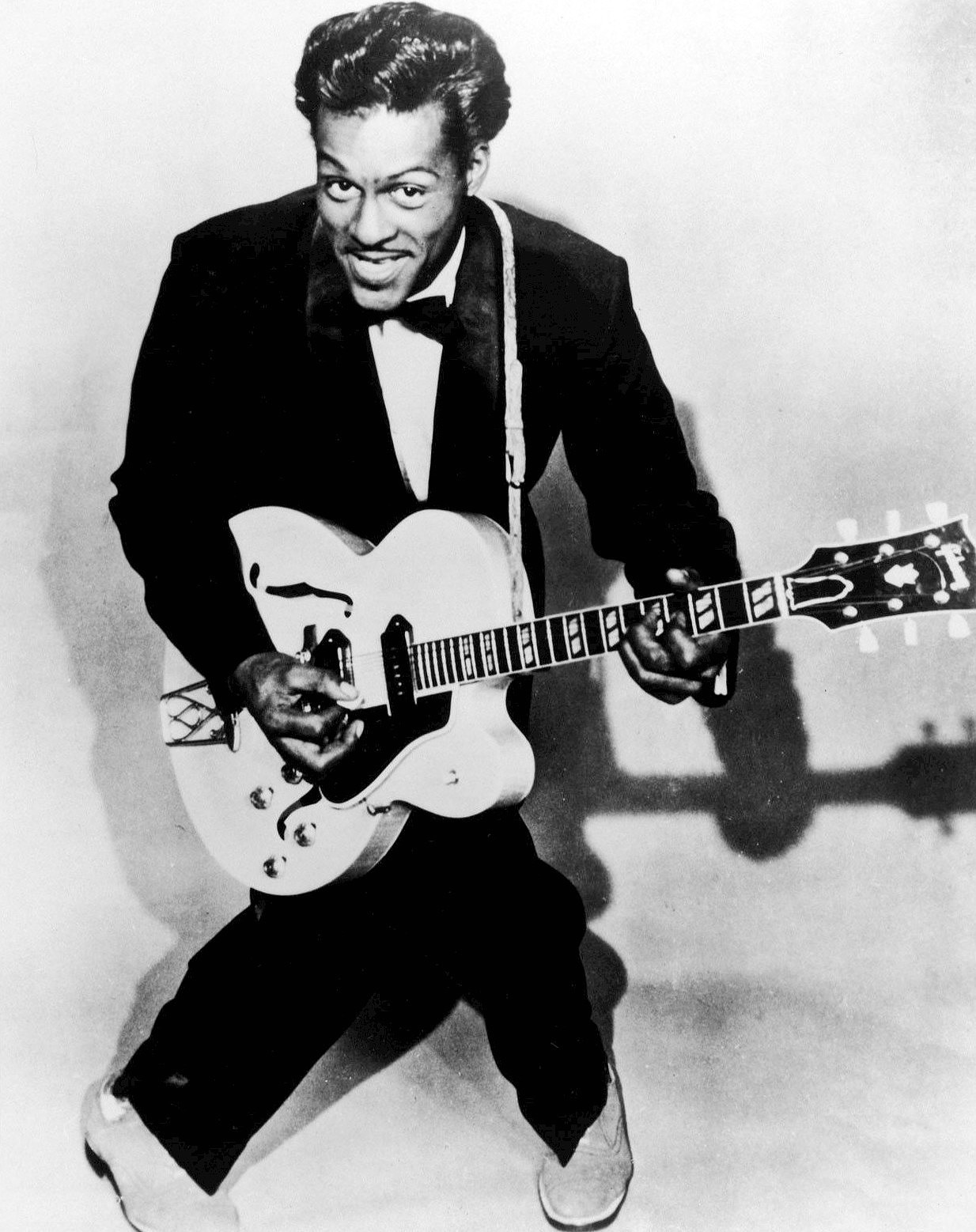
Chuck Berry

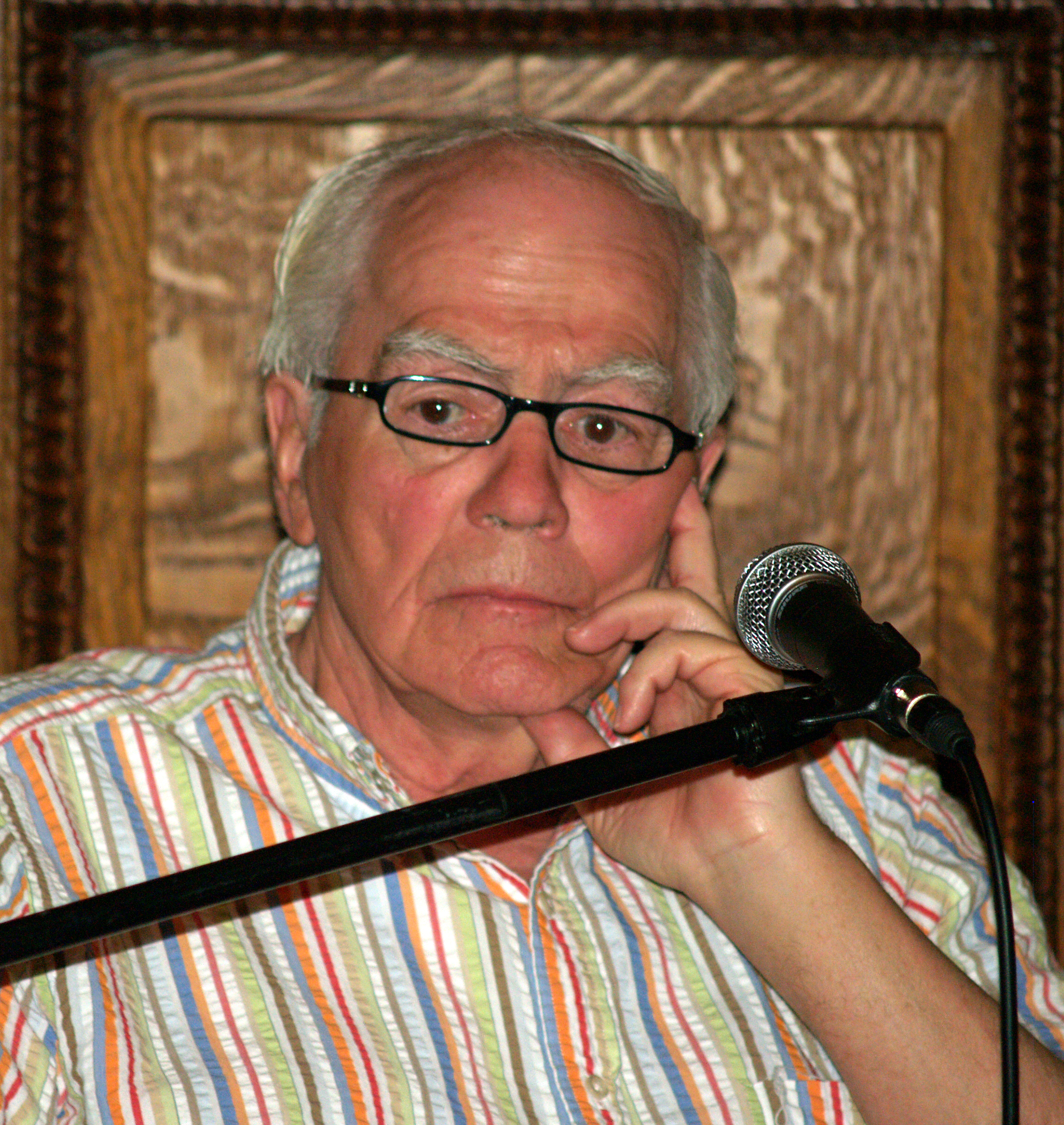
Jimmy Breslin

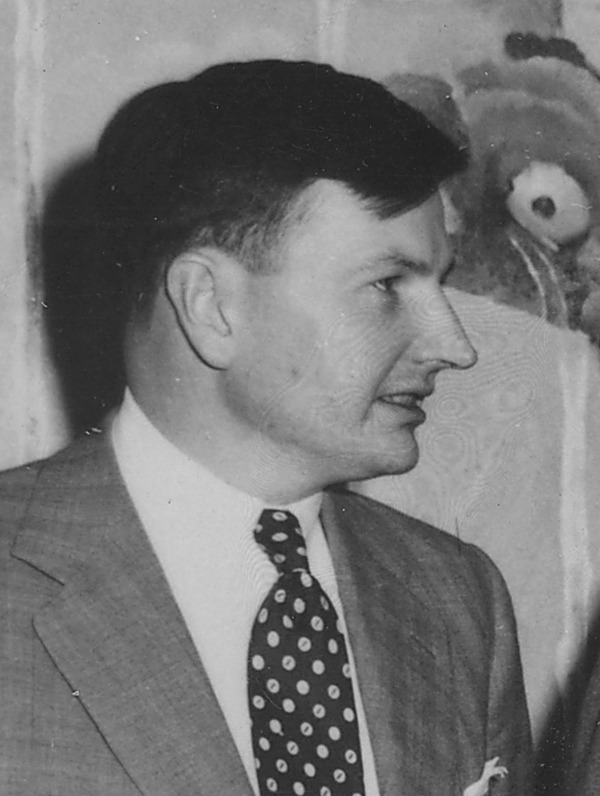
David Rockefeller

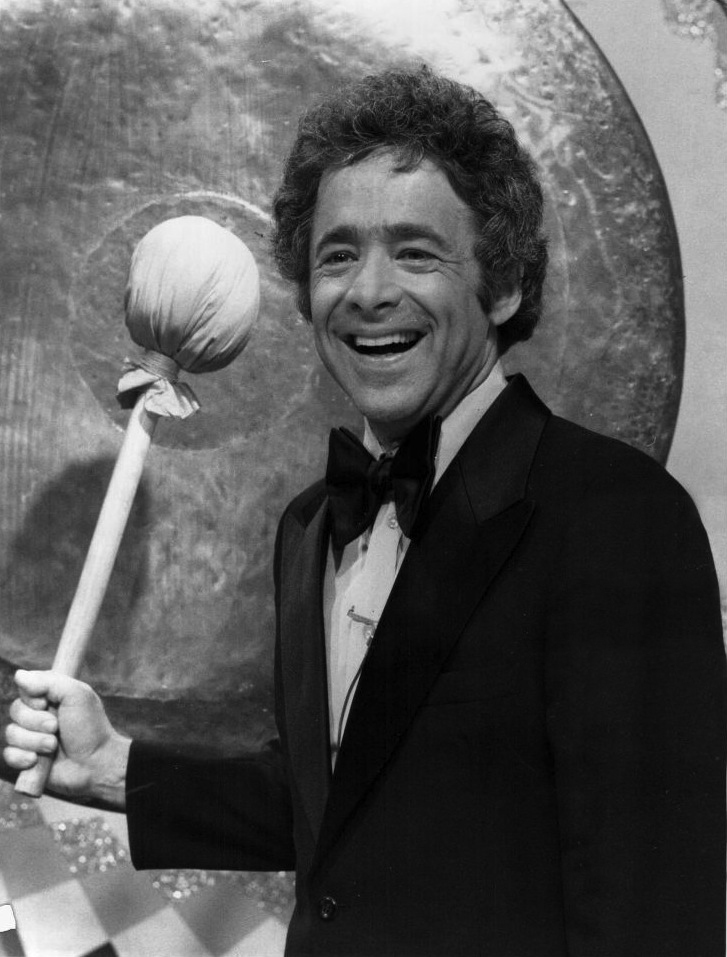
Chuck Barris

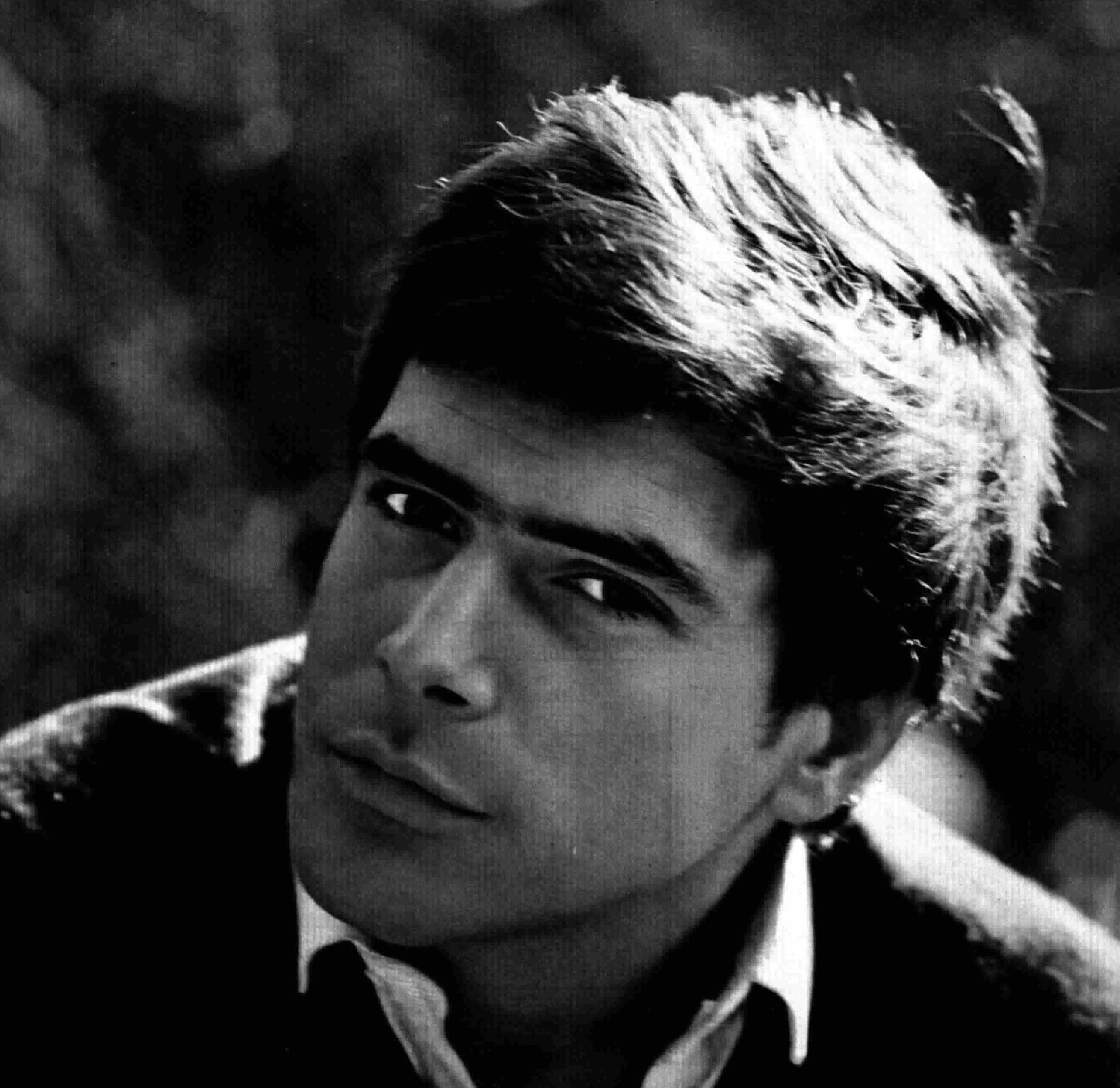
Tomas Milian

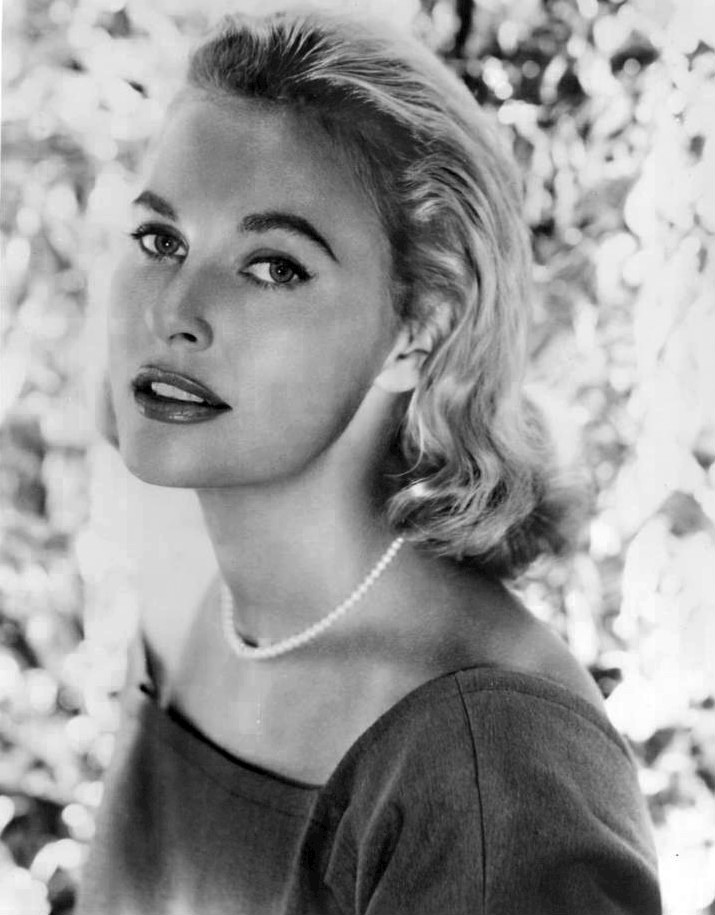
Lola Albright

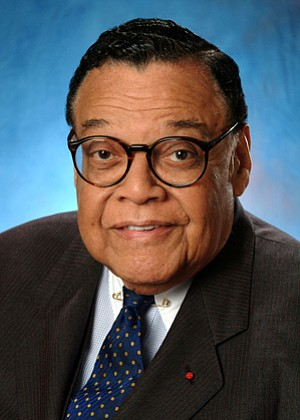
William Thaddeus Coleman Jr.

- March 1
  - Paula Fox, author (b. 1923)
  - Richard Karron, actor (b. 1934)
  - Shirley Palesh, baseball player (b. 1929)
  - Michael M. Ryan, actor (b. 1929)
- March 2
  - Wally Pikal, musician and entertainer (b. 1927)
  - Howard Schmidt, cybersecurity advisor (b. 1949)
  - John D. Schneider, lawyer and politician (b. 1937)
- March 3
  - Míriam Colón, Puerto Rican actress (b. 1930)
  - Tommy Page, American singer-songwriter (b. 1967)
  - Lyle Ritz, musician (b. 1930)
  - Joe Rogers, businessman, co-founder of Waffle House (b. 1919)
  - Stephen Ross, economist (b. 1944)
- March 4
  - Lawrence Holofcener, American-British sculptor, writer, actor, and director (b. 1926)
  - Eugene N. Kozloff, marine biologist and botanist (b. 1920)
  - Helen M. Marshall, politician (b. 1929)
  - Thomas Collier Platt Jr., federal judge (b. 1925)
  - Thomas Starzl, surgeon and researcher (b. 1926)
  - Clayton Yeutter, secretary of agriculture (b. 1930)
- March 5
  - Anthony C. Beilenson, politician (b. 1932)
  - Florence S. Jacobsen, Mormon leader and missionary (b. 1913)
  - Jay Lynch, underground comics artist, writer, and editor (b. 1945)
  - Burke Day, politician (b. 1954)
- March 6
  - Bill Hougland, basketball player (b. 1930)
  - Robert Osborne, film historian and television host (b. 1932)
- March 7
  - Helen Sommers, politician (b. 1932)
  - Lynne Stewart, defense attorney and convicted criminal (b. 1939)
  - Ron Bass, wrestler (b. 1948)
- March 8
  - George Andrew Olah, Hungarian-born Nobel chemist (b. 1927)
  - Dave Valentin, jazz flautist (b. 1952)
- March 9
  - Bobby Byrne, American cinematographer (b. 1931)
  - Bill Hands, American baseball player (b. 1940)
  - Peter Karoff, American philanthropist (b. 1937)
- March 10
  - Bob Altman, comedian (b. 1931)
  - Carol Field, writer and librarian (b. 1940)
  - Charles Wycliffe Joiner, judge (b. 1916)
  - Joni Sledge, singer and songwriter (b. 1956)
- March 13
  - John Crutcher, politician (b. 1916)
  - Kika de la Garza, politician (b. 1927)
  - Amy Krouse Rosenthal, author (b. 1965)
- March 14
  - Rebecca Bace, American computer scientist (b. 1955)
  - Lillie Mae Bradford, American civil rights activist (b. 1928)
  - Thomas H. Friedkin, American businessman (b. 1935)
  - Jack H. Harris, American film producer (b. 1918)
  - Royal Robbins, American rock climber (b. 1934)
  - John Van de Kamp, American politician (b. 1935)
  - John Wheatcroft, American writer and teacher (b. 1925)
- March 15 – Bob Bruce, baseball player (b. 1933)
- March 16 – James Cotton, blues artist (b. 1935)
- March 17
  - Auntie Fee, YouTube personality (b. 1957)
  - Lawrence Montaigne, American actor, writer, dancer, and stuntman (b. 1931)
- March 18
  - Tom Amberry, podiatrist (b. 1922)
  - Chuck Berry, musician (b. 1926)
  - George E. Bria, Italian-born American journalist (b. 1916)
  - Bernie Wrightson, comic artist (b. 1948)
- March 19 – Jimmy Breslin, journalist and author (b. 1928)
- March 20
  - Andy Coan, swimmer (b. 1958)
  - Edward Joseph McManus, politician (b. 1920)
  - Chandler Robbins, ornithologist (b. 1918)
  - David Rockefeller, banker (b. 1915)
  - Edgar Smith, convicted murderer (b. 1934)
- March 21 – Chuck Barris, game show creator, producer, and host (b. 1929)
- March 22
  - Sib Hashian, American drummer (b. 1949)
  - Tomas Milian, Cuban-American actor (b. 1933)
- March 23
  - Lola Albright, singer and actress (b. 1924)
  - William H. Keeler, cardinal of the Roman Catholic Church (b. 1931)
- March 24 – Jean Rouverol, actress, screenwriter and author (b. 1916)
- March 25 – J. Allen Adams, politician and lawyer (b. 1932)
- March 26
  - Jimmy Dotson, blues singer (b. 1933)
  - Darlene Cates, actress (b. 1947)
- March 27 – Chelsea Brown, American actress (b. 1942)
- March 28
  - Deane R. Hinton, American diplomat and ambassador (b. 1923)
  - William McPherson, American writer and journalist (b. 1933)
  - Bill Minor, American journalist (b. 1922)
- March 29
  - Alexei Alexeyevich Abrikosov, Russian-American theoretical physicist (b. 1928)
  - John Collias, American western artist (b. 1918)
  - Wayne Duke, American collegiate athletic executive (b. 1928)
  - Steen Miles, American politician (b. 1946)
  - Linwood Sexton, American football player (b. 1926)
  - Katherine Smith, American Navajo activist (b. 1918)
  - Ken Sparks, American football coach and player (b. 1944)
- March 30
  - Richard Bustillo, American martial arts instructor (b. 1941)
  - Rosie Hamlin, American singer (b. 1945)
  - Donald Harvey, American serial killer (b. 1952)
  - Robert Mahoney, American politician (b. 1921)
  - Alfred C. Marble Jr., American Episcopal prelate (b. 1936)
  - Hattie Peterson, American baseball player (b. 1930)
- March 31
  - Gilbert Baker, American artist, creator of the LGBT flag (b. 1951)
  - Richard Nelson Bolles, American writer (b. 1926)
  - William Thaddeus Coleman Jr., Secretary of Transportation (b. 1920)
  - Jerrier A. Haddad, American computer engineer (b. 1922)
  - James Hadnot, American football player (b. 1957)
  - James Clinkscales Hill, American jurist (b. 1923)
  - Radley Metzger, American pornographic filmmaker (b. 1928)
  - Amy Ridenour, American conservative political activist (b. 1960)
  - James Rosenquist, American artist (b. 1934)

=== April ===
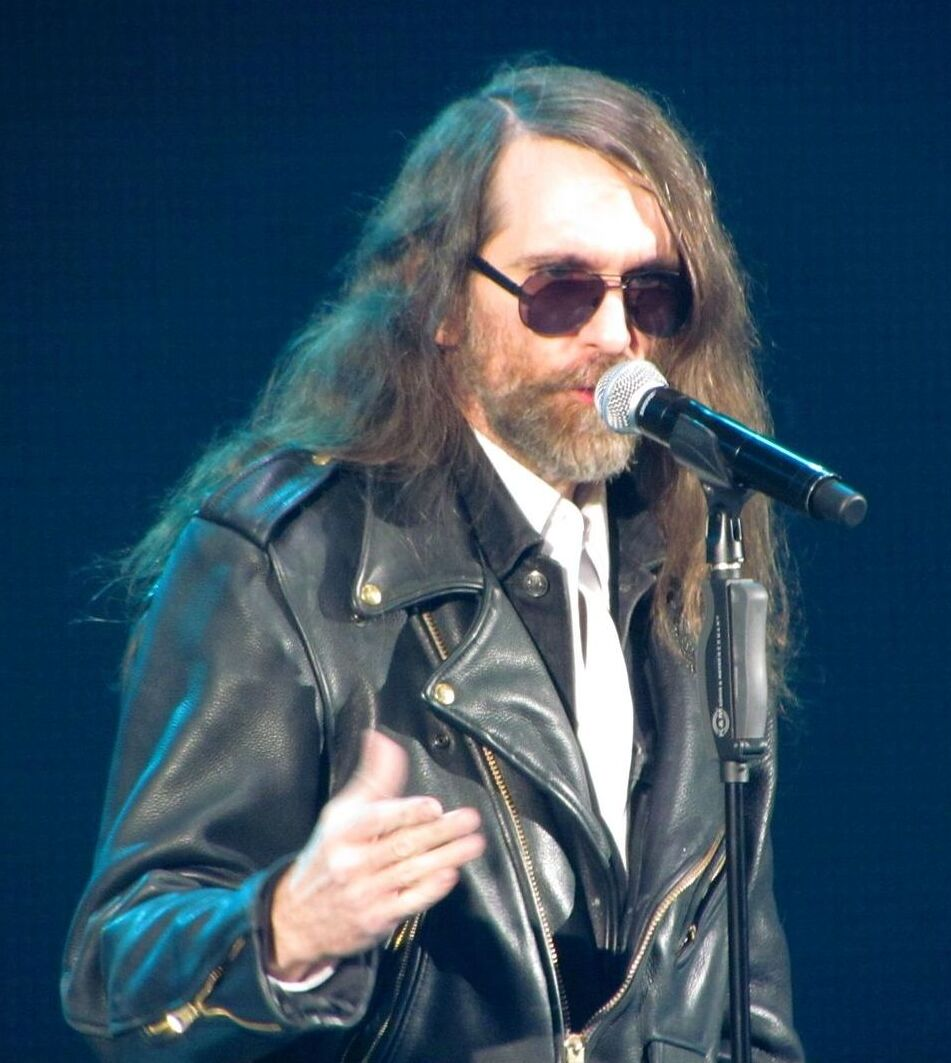
Paul O'Neill

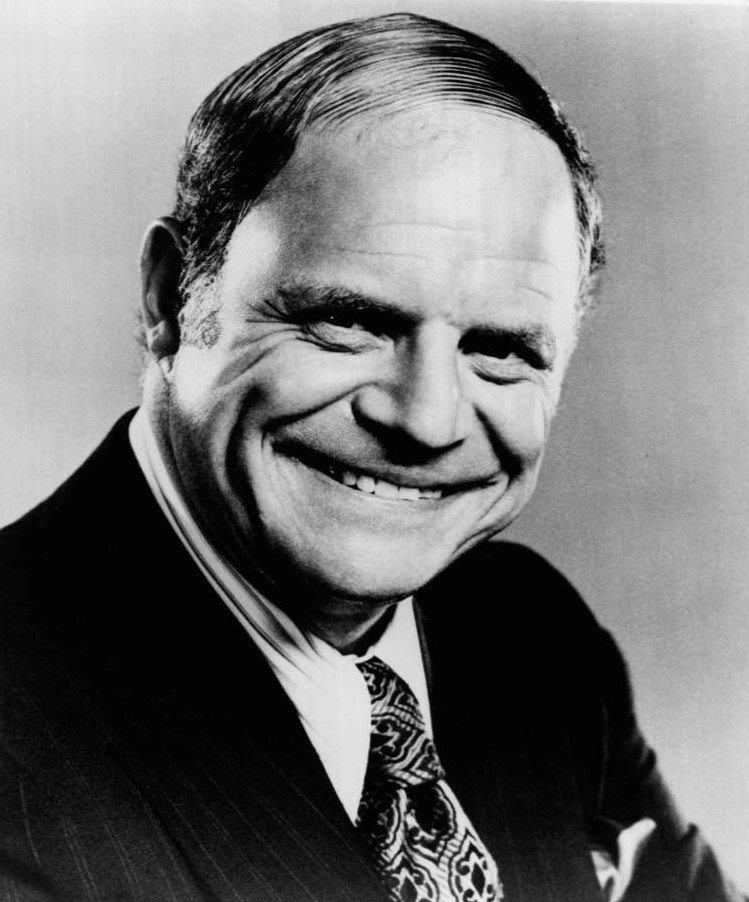
Don Rickles

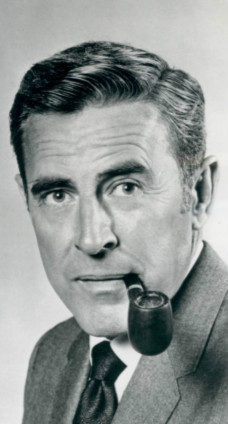
Peter Hansen

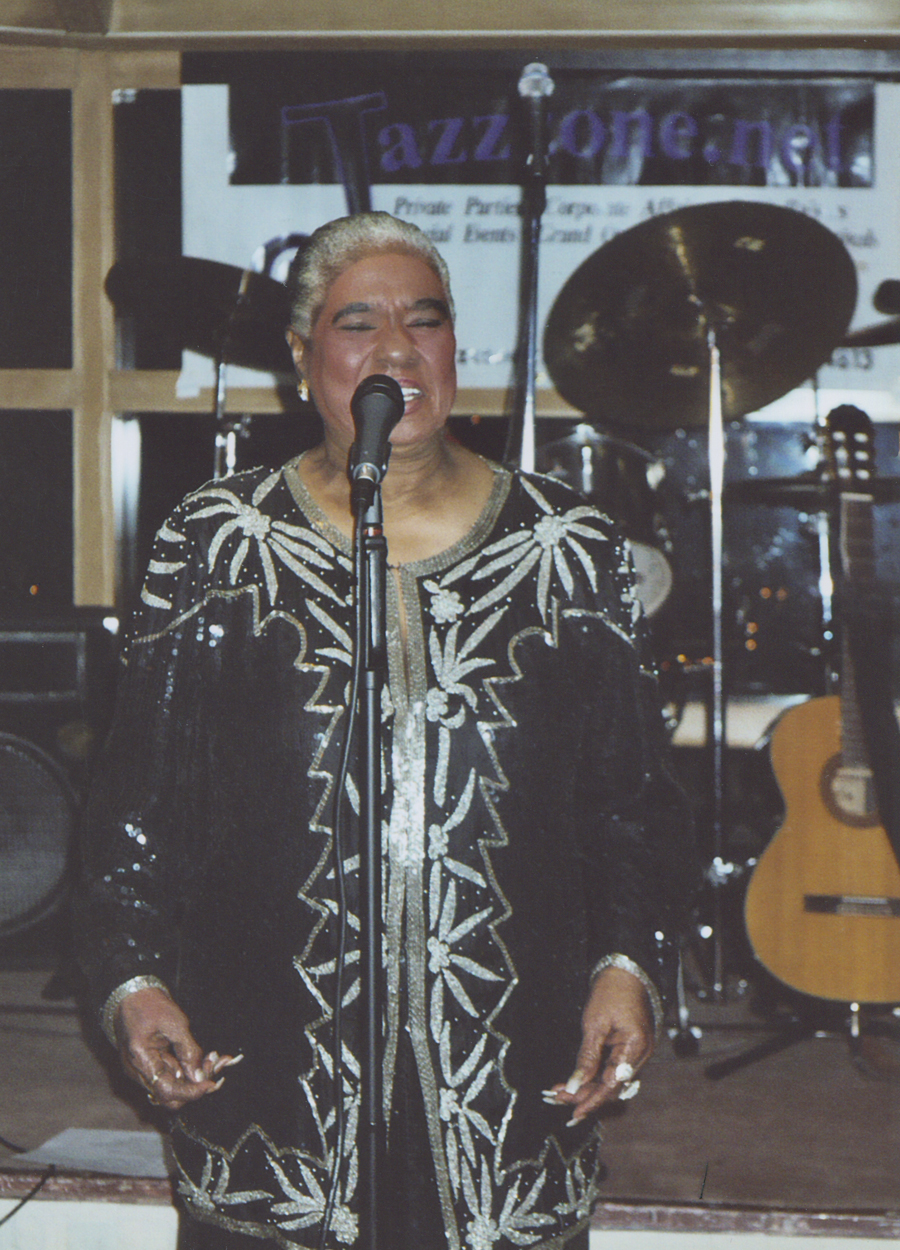
Linda Hopkins

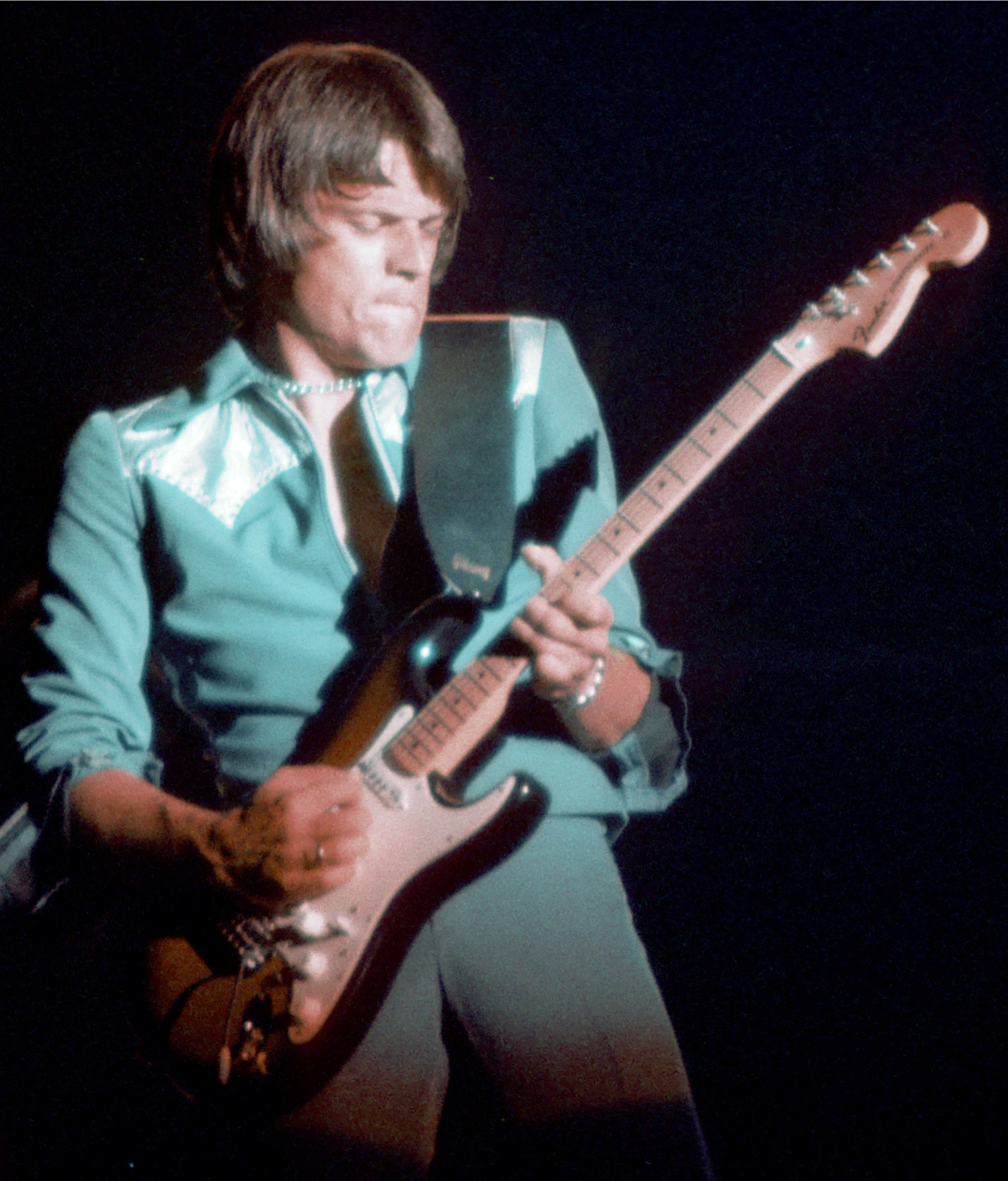
J. Geils

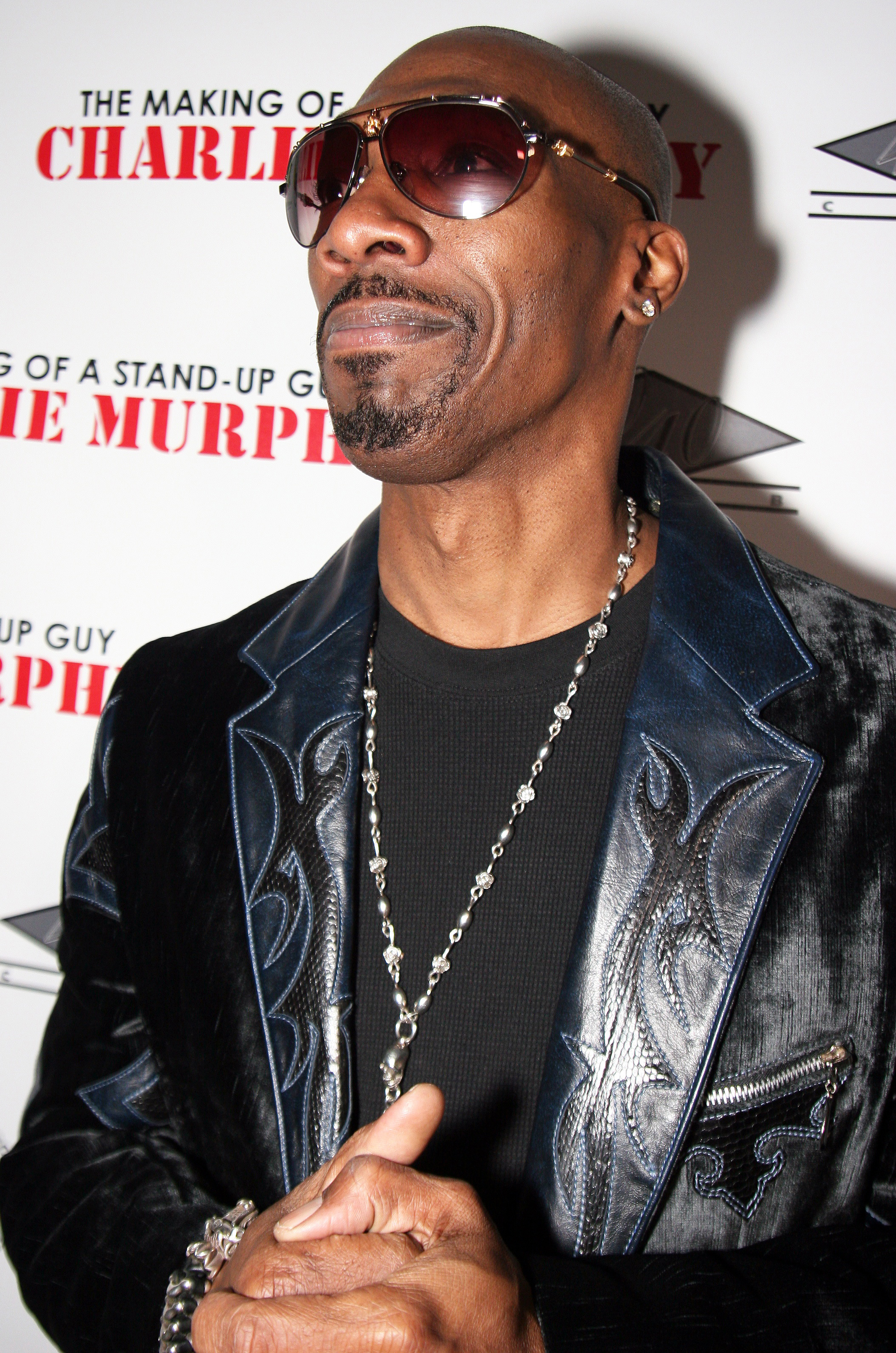
Charlie Murphy

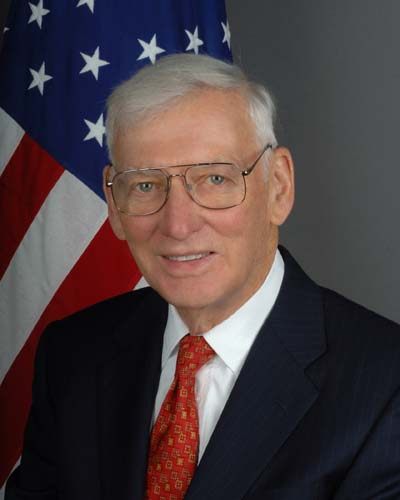
Dan Rooney

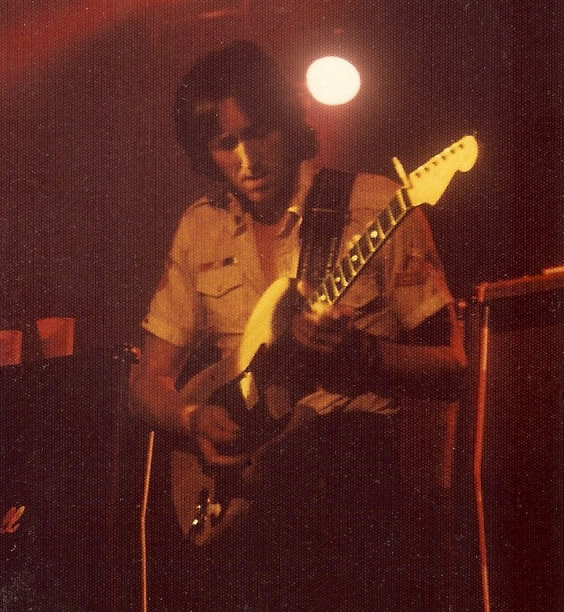
Allan Holdsworth

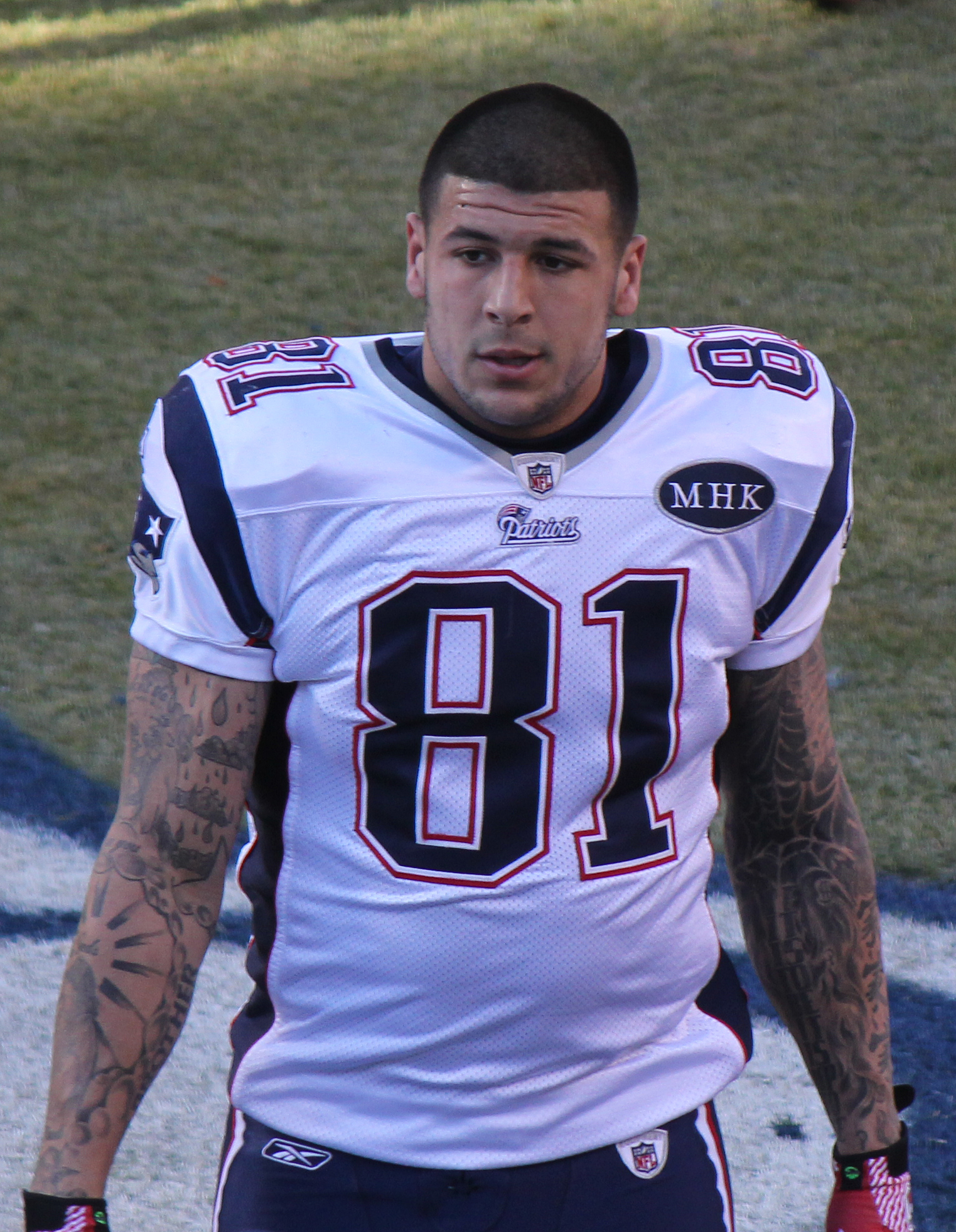
Aaron Hernandez

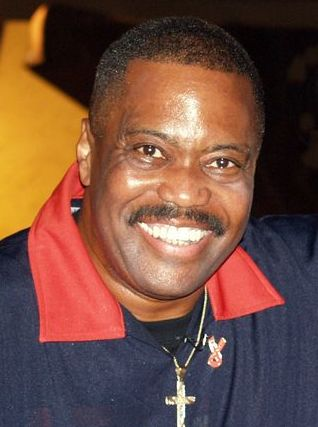
Cuba Gooding Sr.

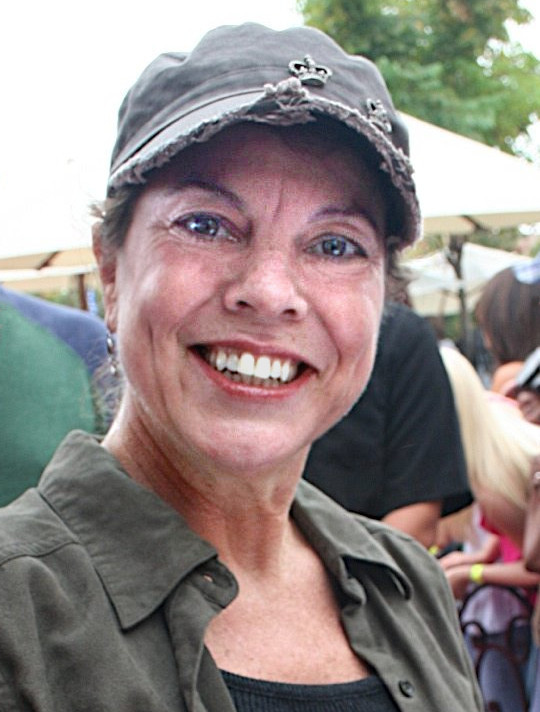
Erin Moran

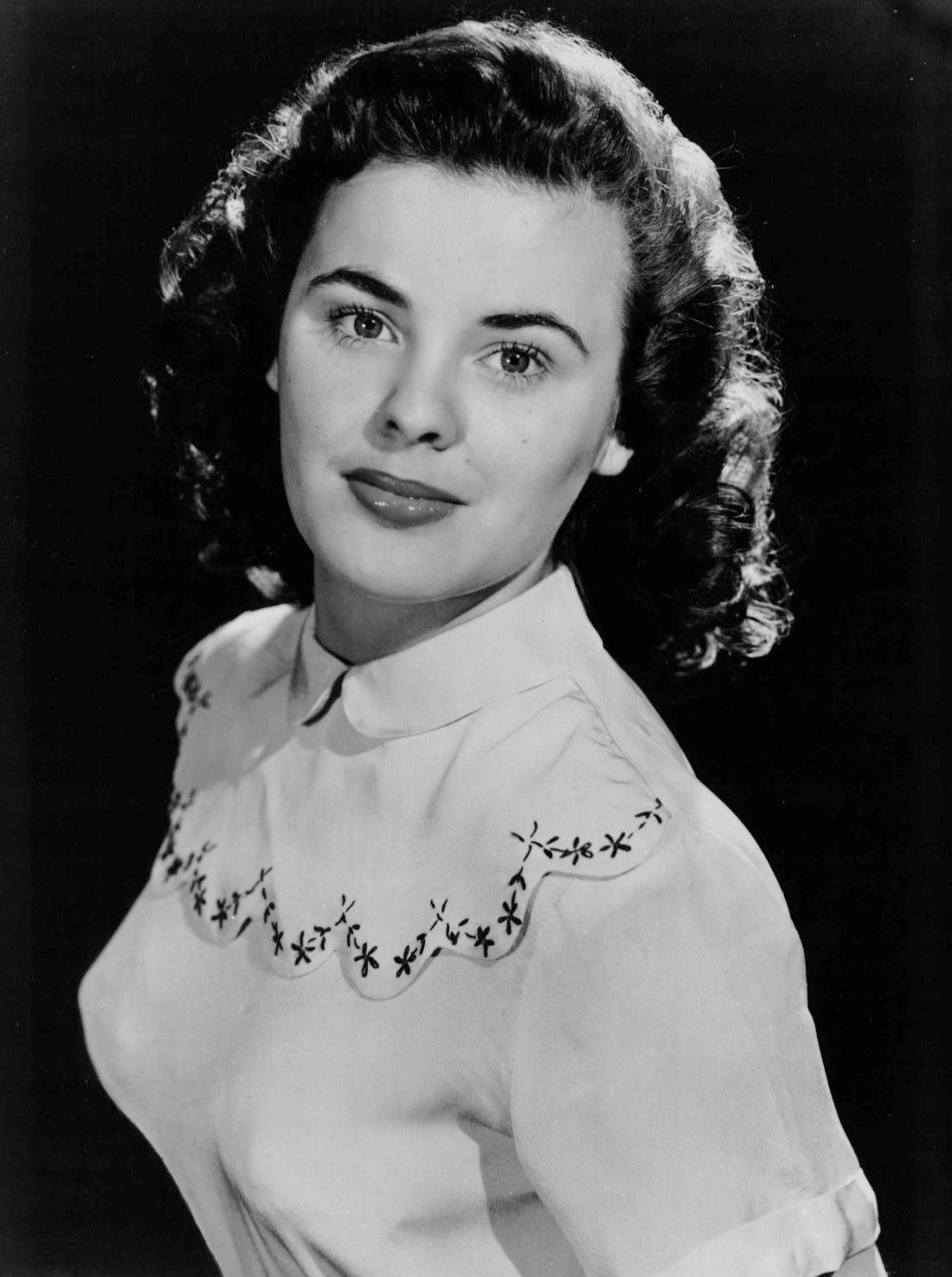
Kathleen Crowley

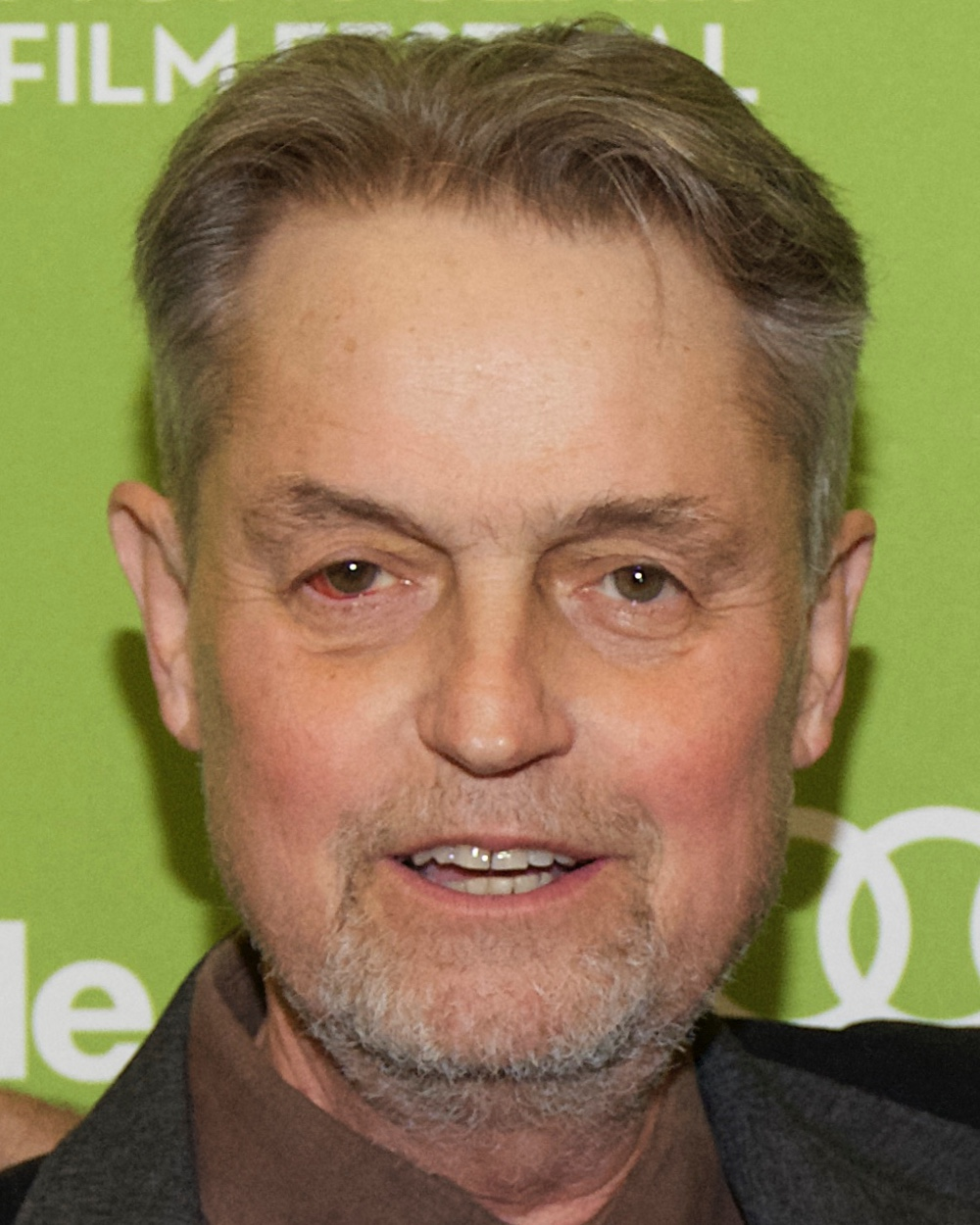
Jonathan Demme

- April 1
  - Sharon Ambrose, politician, member of the Council of the District of Columbia (b. 1939)
  - Gary Austin, theatre writer and director (b. 1941)
  - Lonnie Brooks, blues guitarist and singer (b. 1933)
  - Bob Cunningham, jazz bassist (b. 1934)
  - Frederick Bernard Lacey, jurist (b. 1920)
  - Louis Sarno, musicologist and author (b. 1954)
  - Burton Watson, translator (b. 1925)
- April 2
  - Sam Ard, racecar driver (b. 1939)
  - Ken Donnelly, politician (b. 1950)
  - Rhubarb Jones, country disc jockey and professional wrestling ring announcer (b. 1951)
  - Hate Man, writer (b. 1936)
  - Leonard Litwin, real estate developer (b. 1914)
  - Gerard Washnitzer, mathematician (b. 1926)
- April 3
  - Abraham S. Fischler, academic (b. 1928)
  - John T. Knox, politician and lawyer (b. 1924)
  - Enrico Quarantelli, sociologist (b. 1924)
  - Roy Sievers, baseball player (b. 1926)
  - Thomas Tackaberry, military officer (b. 1923)
  - Gary W. Thomas, judge (b. 1938)
  - William Walaska, politician and senator (b. 1946)
- April 4
  - Tobias Barry, American politician (b. 1924)
  - George Mostow, American mathematician (b. 1923)
- April 5
  - Arthur Bisguier, chess grandmaster and writer (b. 1929)
  - John Chittick, HIV/AIDS activist (b. 1948)
  - David Gove, ice hockey player and coach (b. 1978)
  - Hugh Montgomery, intelligence officer (b. 1956)
  - Paul O'Neill, producer, composer and songwriter (b. 1956)
  - George Snyder, politician and businessman (b. 1929)
- April 6
  - Frank Attkisson, politician (b. 1955)
  - Bob Cerv, baseball player (b. 1925)
  - Don Rickles, comedian (b. 1926)
  - Hugh Montgomery, diplomat and intelligence officer (b. 1923)
  - Clyde See, politician and lawyer (b. 1941)
- April 7
  - Derrick Jensen, football player (b. 1956)
  - Patricia McKissack, children's writer (b. 1944)
  - Glenn O'Brien, journalist and editor (b. 1947)
  - Craig Payne, boxer (b. 1961)
  - Ben Speer, musician (b. 1930)
- April 8
  - Alicia Appleman-Jurman, 86, Polish-born Israeli-American memoirist (b. 1930)
  - Stephen Caracappa, NYPD police detective and organized crime operative (b. 1942)
  - Eugene Lang, philanthropist (b. 1919)
  - Kim Plainfield, jazz drummer (b. 1954)
  - Donald Sarason, mathematician (b. 1933)
- April 9
  - Richard Kenneth Fox, American diplomat (b. 1925)
  - Peter Hansen, American actor (b. 1921)
  - Harry Huskey, American computer scientist (b. 1915)
  - Bob Wootton, American country guitarist (b. 1941)
  - Jean Worthley, American naturalist and television presenter (b. 1924)
- April 10
  - Al Besselink, American professional golfer (b. 1923)
  - Linda Hopkins, American actress and singer (b. 1924)
- April 11 – J. Geils, American musician (b. 1946)
- April 12 – Charlie Murphy, actor, comedian, voice artist and writer (b. 1959)
- April 13
  - Vic Barnhart, American baseball player (b. 1922)
  - Dennis Edwards Jr., American judge (b. 1921)
  - Daniel Guice, American politician (b. 1924)
  - Robert D. Marta, American film camera operator (b. 1943)
  - Dan Rooney, American football executive and diplomat, Ambassador to Ireland (b. 1932)
  - Robert Taylor, computer scientist (b. 1932)
- April 14
  - Robert H. Abel, American author (b. 1941)
  - John Thomas Curtin, American jurist (b. 1921)
  - Henry Hillman, American venture capitalist and philanthropist (b. 1918)
  - Bruce Langhorne, American folk musician (b. 1938)
  - Hugh Pitts, American football player (b. 1933)
  - Patti Smith, American politician (b. 1946)
- April 15
  - Allan Holdsworth, British guitarist and composer (b. 1946)
  - Matt Holt, singer (b. 1977)
  - Clifton James, American actor (b. 1920)
  - Sylvia Moy, American singer-songwriter (b. 1938)
- April 17
  - Matt Anoaʻi, pro wrestler (b. 1970)
  - Robert B. Hibbs, American Episcopal prelate (b. 1932)
  - Dawson Mathis, politician (b. 1940)
  - John T. Noonan Jr., judge (b. 1926)
  - Trish Vradenburg, American screenwriter (b. 1946)
- April 18
  - Vic Albury, American baseball player (b. 1947)
  - Bill Anderson, American football player (b. 1936)
  - David Ball, American Episcopal prelate (b. 1926)
  - David Chandler, American physical chemist (b. 1944)
  - Raymond Han, American painter (b. 1931)
  - Barkley L. Hendricks, American painter (b. 1944)
  - Dorrance Hill Hamilton, American philanthropist (b. 1928)
  - Jaak Panksepp, Estonian-born American neuroscientist (b. 1942)
  - David H. Rodgers, American politician (b. 1923)
  - J. C. Spink, American producer (b. 1971)
- April 19 – Aaron Hernandez, Former Tight End for the New England Patriots, Convicted Murderer (b. 1989)
- April 20 – Cuba Gooding Sr., soul singer (b. 1944)
- April 21
  - Carl Christ, American economist (b. 1923)
  - Maria Zhorella Fedorova, Austrian-born American opera singer and teacher (b. 1915)
  - Sandy Gallin, American talent agent and producer (b. 1940)
  - John Grinold, American college athletic director (b. 1935)
  - Kristine Jepson, American mezzo-soprano (b. 1962)
  - Robert H. Shaffer, American academic (b. 1915)
- April 22
  - Hector Acebes, American photographer (b. 1920)
  - Hubert Dreyfus, philosopher (b. 1929)
  - William Hjortsberg, American novelist and screenwriter (b. 1940)
  - Jess Kersey, American basketball official (b. 1940)
  - Alvin H. Kukuk, American politician (b. 1937)
  - Erin Moran, actress (b. 1960)
- April 23
  - Jaynne Bittner, American baseball player (b. 1925)
  - Anne Pippin Burnett, American classics scholar (b. 1925)
  - Kathleen Crowley, actress (b. 1929)
  - Ana Delfosse, Chilean-born American race-car driver and mechanic (b. 1931)
  - Kate O'Beirne, American political columnist, editor and commentator (b. 1949)
  - Ken Sears, basketball player (b. 1933)
- April 24 – Don Gordon, actor (b. 1926)
- April 26
  - Jonathan Demme, film director (b. 1944)
  - Tom Forkner, American businessman and lawyer (b. 1918)
  - Andrew G. Frommelt, American politician (b. 1921)
  - James Knoll Gardner, American jurist (b. 1940)
  - Robert Hilder, American jurist (b. 1949)
  - Chet Kalm, American artist (b. 1925)
  - Dennis Karjala, American law professor (b. 1939)
  - William L. Kirk, American air force general (b. 1932)
  - Daniel Francis Merriam, American geologist (b. 1926)
  - Harold Van Heuvelen, American composer and teacher (b. 1918)
- April 28
  - Joanna Brouk, American electronic musician and composer (b. 1948)
  - Mariano Gagnon, American missionary (b. 1929)
  - Richard Haynes, lawyer (b. 1927)
  - William M. Hoffman, playwright and editor (b. 1939)
  - Janelle Kirtley, American water skier (b. 1943)
  - Billy Scott, American race car driver (b. 1948)
  - John Shifflett, American jazz musician (b. 1952)
  - Patrick Thaddeus, American astronomer (b. 1932)
- April 30
  - Anna Lee Carroll, American actress (b. 1930)
  - Lorna Gray, American actress (b. 1917)
  - Howard Hart, American CIA officer (b. 1940)
  - Preston Henn, American entrepreneur (b. 1932)
  - Jack Imel, American entertainer (b. 1932)
  - Ray Kogovsek, American politician (b. 1941)
  - Tam Spiva, American screenwriter (b. 1932)
  - Jean Stein, American author and editor (b. 1933)

=== May ===
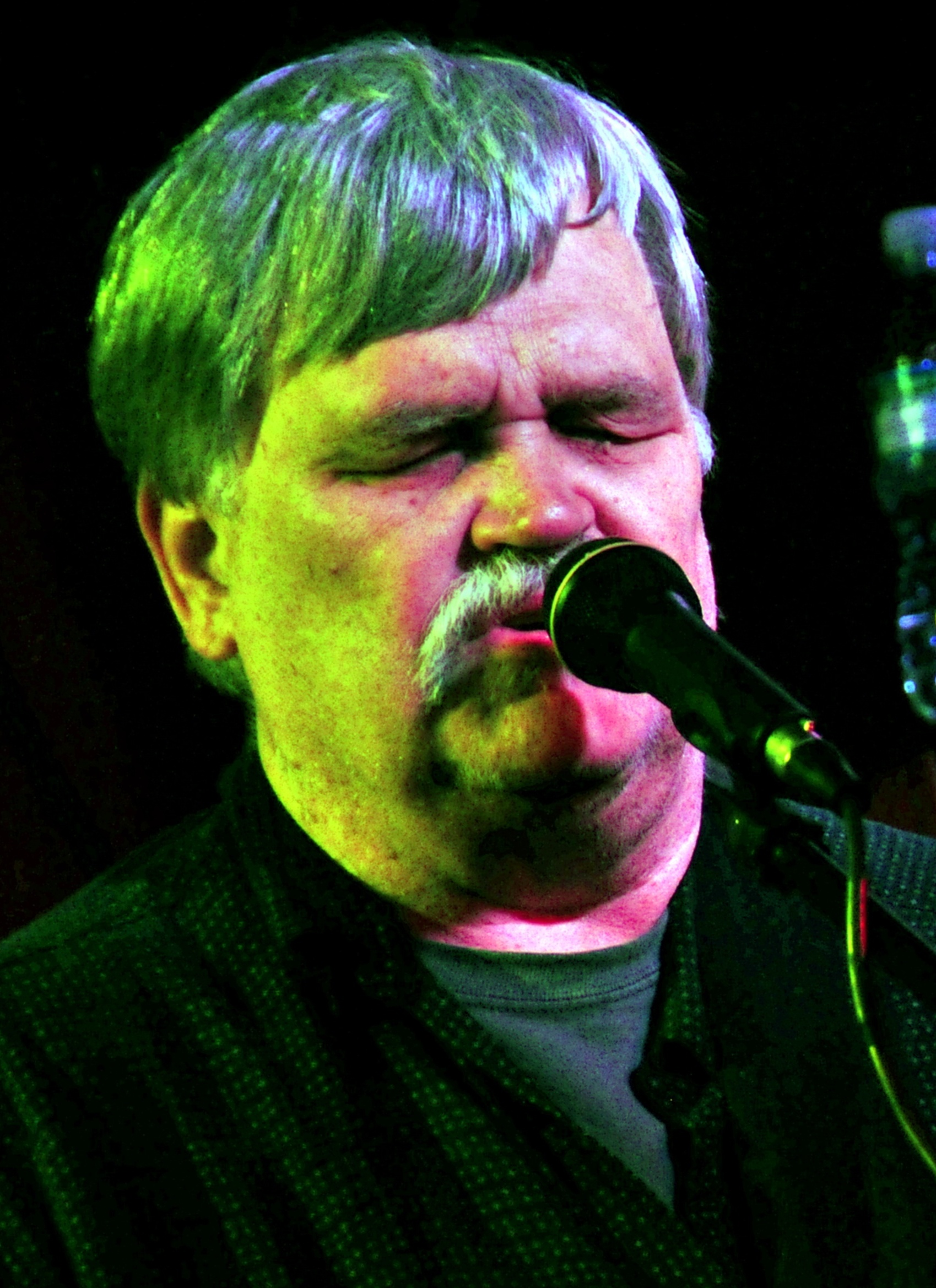
Bruce Hampton

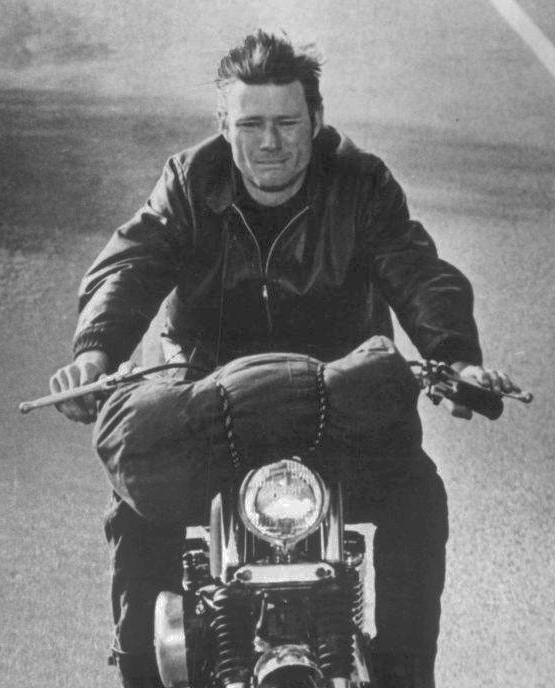
Michael Parks

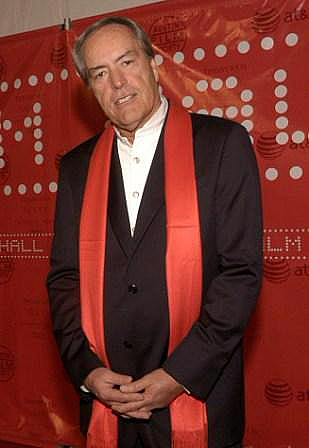
Powers Boothe

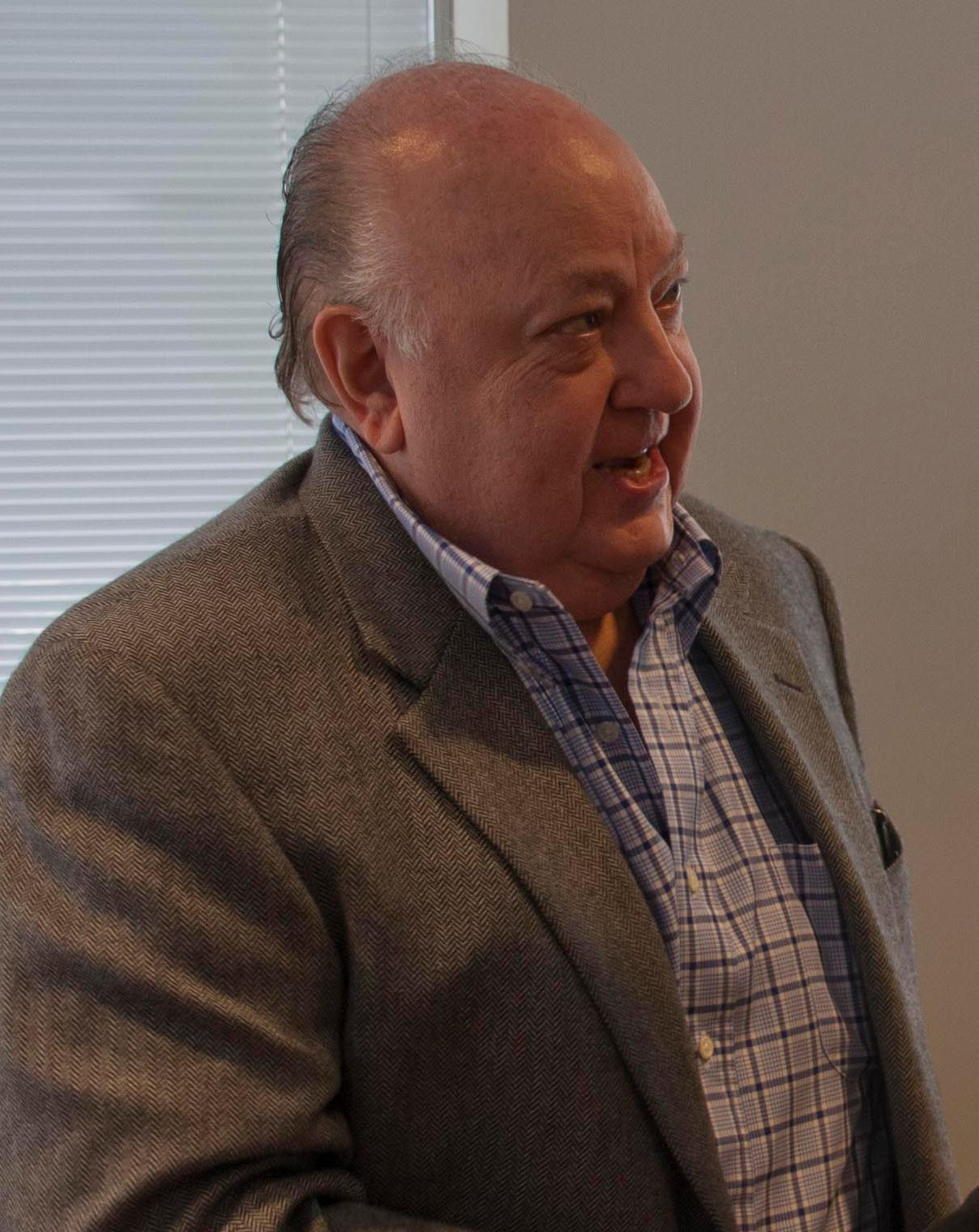
Roger Ailes

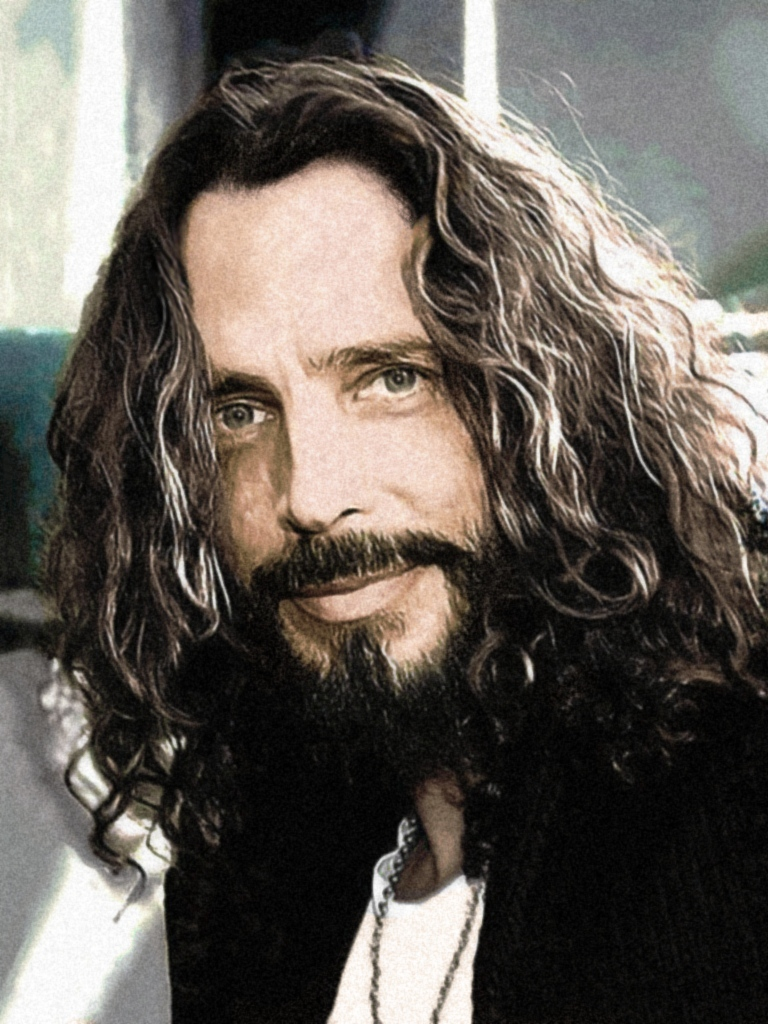
Chris Cornell

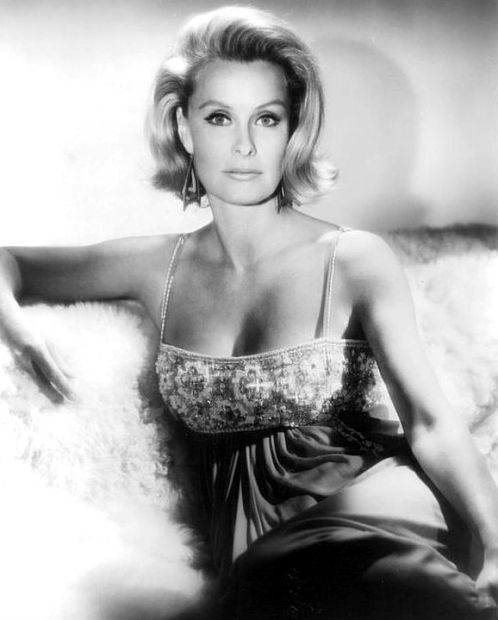
Dina Merrill

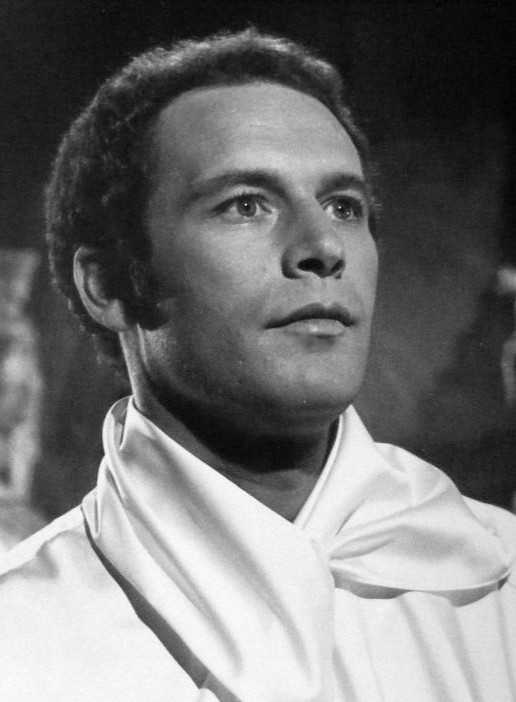
Jared Martin

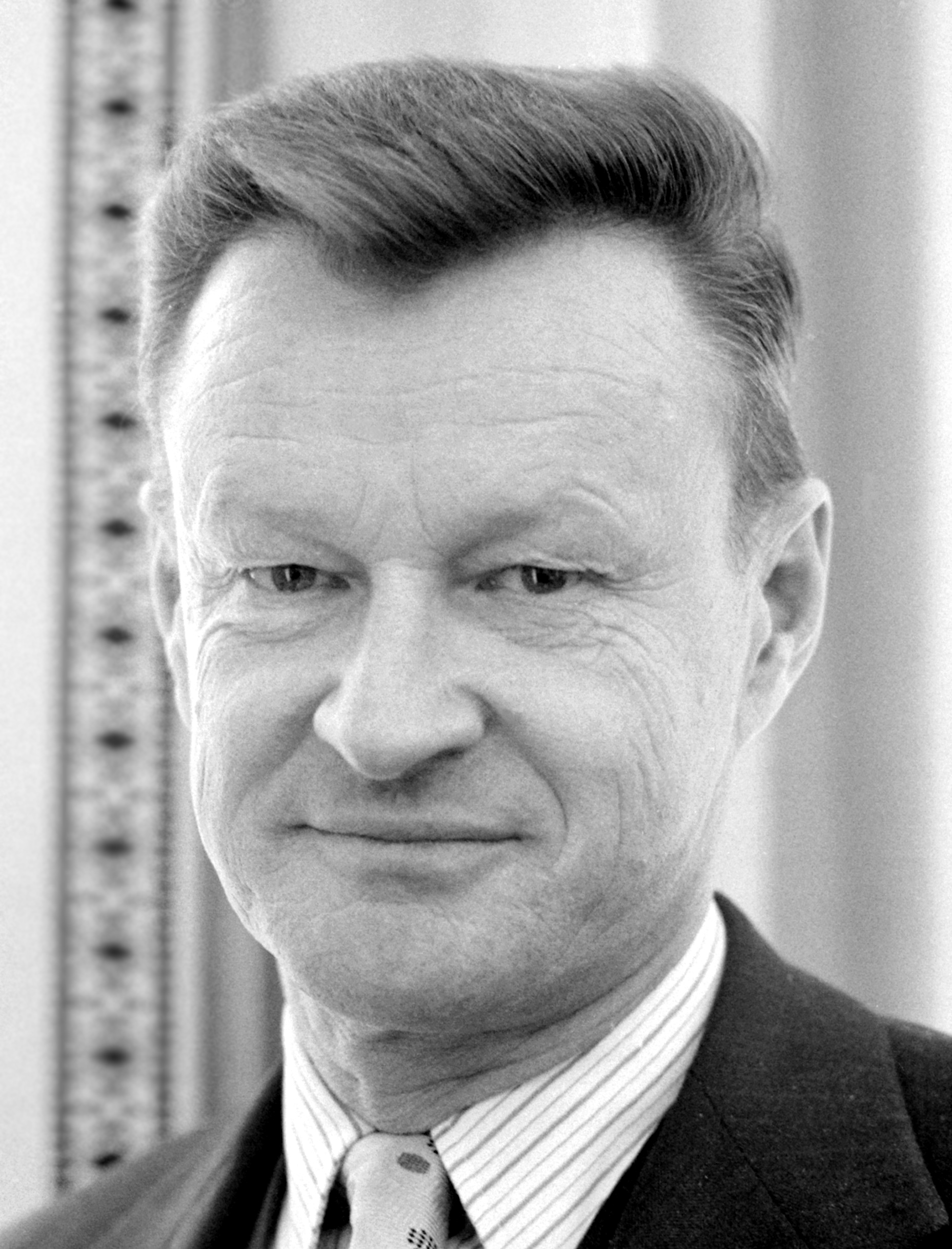
Zbigniew Brzezinski

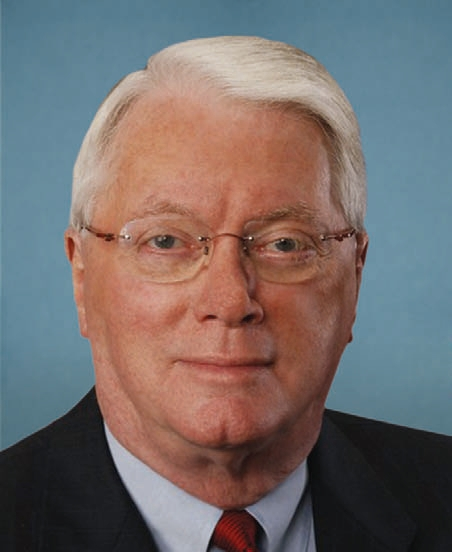
Jim Bunning

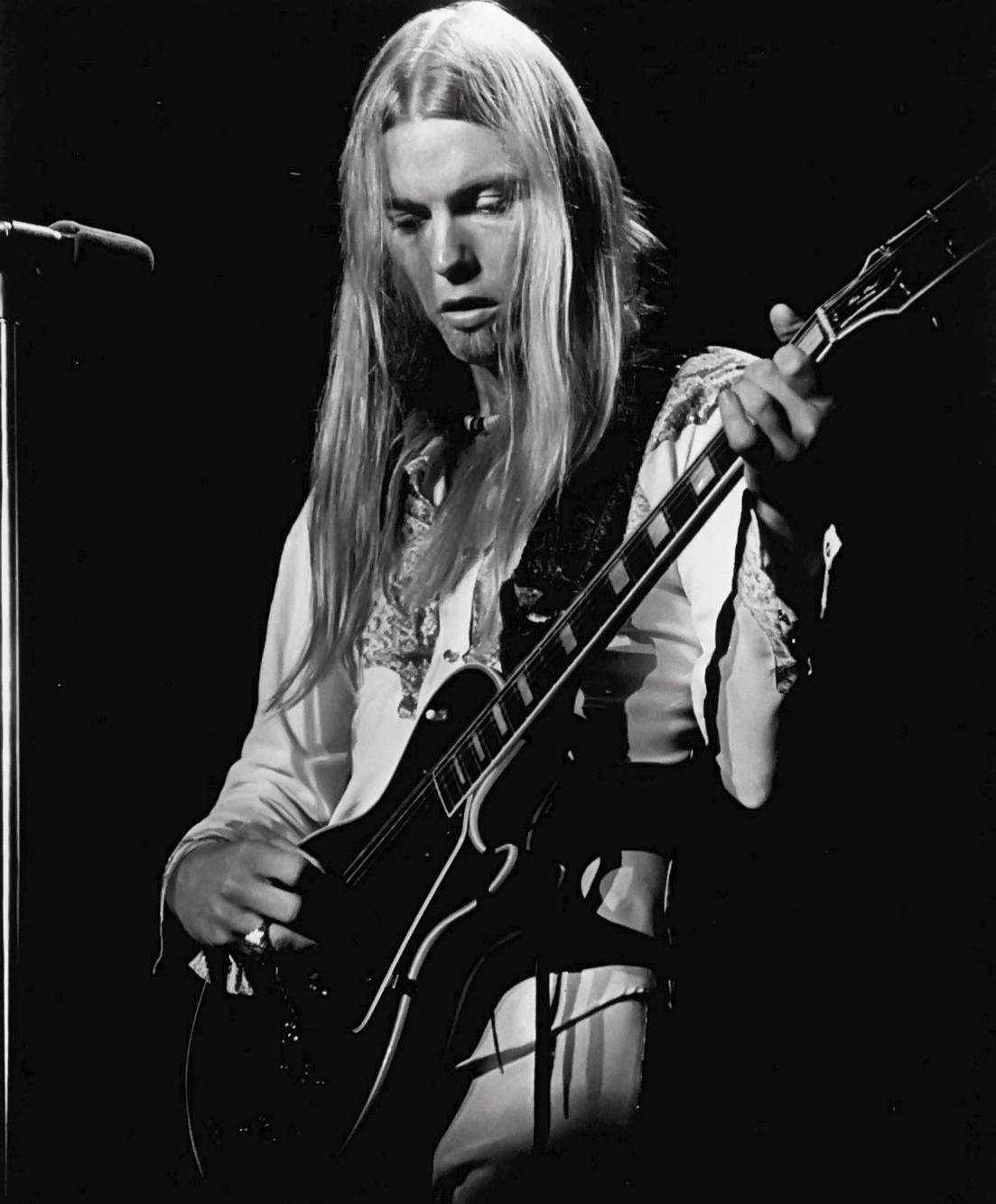
Gregg Allman

- May 1
  - Richard Basciano, real estate developer (b. 1925)
  - Bruce Hampton, guitarist (b. 1947)
  - Alice Langtry, politician (b. 1932)
  - Mike Lowry, politician; Governor of Washington from 1993 to 1997 (b. 1939)
  - Sam Mele, baseball player and manager (b. 1922)
  - Janet Pilgrim, model (b. 1934)
  - Stanley Weston, toy inventor (b. 1933)
- May 2
  - Anne Morrissy Merick, journalist (b. 1933)
  - George Hugh Niederauer, Roman Catholic prelate (b. 1936)
  - T. Gary Rogers, business executive (b. 1943)
  - Leo K. Thorsness, U.S. Air Force colonel and politician (b. 1932)
- May 3
  - Alma W. Byrd, politician (b. 1924)
  - Paul Hanneman, politician (b. 1936)
  - Charles Hoffer, music educator (b. 1929)
  - Casey Jones, blues drummer (b. 1939)
  - Irene Smart, politician and judge (b. 1921)
- May 4
  - William Baumol, economist (b. 1922)
  - Jay Carty, basketball player (b. 1941)
  - William A. Davis Jr., engineer (b. 1927)
  - C. Jackson Grayson, businessman and FBI agent (b. 1923)
  - Glenna Sue Kidd, baseball player (b. 1933)
  - Richard Pennington, police officer (b. 1947)
  - Edwin Sherin, theatre, film, and television director (b. 1930)
- May 5
  - Adolph Kiefer, 1936 Olympic swimming gold medalist (b. 1918)
  - Quinn O'Hara, Scottish-born actress and nurse (b. 1941)
  - Michael Zwack, artist (b. 1949)
- May 6
  - Richard Battey, federal judge (b. 1929)
  - Steven Holcomb, Olympic medalist in bobsledding (b. 1980)
  - Peter Kivy, musicologist (b. 1934)
  - John Schultz, writer (b. 1932)
  - Jack Tilton, art dealer (b. 1951)
- May 7
  - Peter T. Flawn, geologist (b. 1926)
  - Bob Mimm, racewalker (b. 1924)
  - Rod Monroe, football player (b. 1976)
  - Chuck Orsborn, basketball player and coach and university athletic director (b. 1917)
  - Dave Pell, jazz saxophonist and bandleader (b. 1925)
  - Lee Weissenborn, politician (b. 1929)
- May 8
  - Dennis H. Farber, painter and photographer (b. 1946)
  - George Irvine, basketball player and coach (b. 1948)
  - Curt Lowens, German-born actor and Holocaust survivor (b. 1925)
  - Allan H. Meltzer, economist (b. 1928)
  - Judith Stein, historian (b. 1940)
  - James S. Sutterlin, author, academic, and diplomat (b. 1922)
  - Clarence Williams, football player (b. 1946)
- May 9
  - Christopher Boykin, reality television personality (b. 1972)
  - John Kivela, politician (b. 1969)
  - Michael Parks, actor and singer (b. 1940)
  - Wilburn K. Ross, U.S. Army soldier and Medal of Honor recipient (b. 1922)
  - Edward Lunn Young, politician (b. 1920)
- May 10
  - Joy Byers, songwriter (b. 1934)
  - Greg Forristall, politician (b. 1950)
  - Douglas Netter, television producer and executive (b. 1921)
- May 11
  - William David Brohn, music arranger (b. 1933)
  - Seaborn Buckalew Jr., lawyer and judge (b. 1920)
  - John F. Donahue, businessman (b. 1924)
  - Yale Lary, football player, businessman, and politician (b. 1930)
  - Charles A. McClenahan, politician (b. 1941)
- May 12
  - Bill Dowdy, jazz drummer (b. 1932)
  - Michael Jackson, football player (b. 1969)
  - Sally Jacobsen, journalist and editor (b. 1947)
  - Henri Termeer, Dutch-born biotechnology executive (b. 1946)
  - George A. Thompson, geologist (b. 1919)
- May 13
  - Ron Bontemps, basketball player and Olympic gold medalist (b. 1926)
  - John Cygan, comedian, actor, and voice artist (b. 1954)
  - Thomas H. Paterniti, dentist and politician (b. 1929)
  - Len Rohde, football player (b. 1938)
- May 14
  - Powers Boothe, actor (b. 1948)
  - Frank Brian, basketball player (b. 1923)
  - Bill Cox, football player (b. 1929)
  - Thomas Vose Daily, Roman Catholic prelate (b. 1927)
  - Chuck Davis, dancer and choreographer (b. 1937)
  - Jean Fritz, children's author (b. 1917)
  - Brad Grey, film and television producer (b. 1957)
  - Steve Palermo, American League umpire and shooting survivor (b. 1949)
- May 17
  - Roxcy Bolton, feminist and women's rights activist (b. 1926)
  - Firuz Kazemzadeh, Russian-born historian (b. 1924)
  - David A Ramey, artist (b. 1939)
  - Unusual Heat, Thoroughbred racehorse (b. 1990)
- May 18
  - Roger Ailes, television executive, CEO of Fox News (b. 1940)
  - Chris Cornell, musician, singer, and songwriter (b. 1964)
  - Jacque Fresco, futurist and social engineer (b. 1916)
  - Jim McElreath, race car driver (b. 1928)
  - Erwin Potts, business executive (b. 1932)
- May 19
  - Donald Avenson, politician (b. 1944)
  - Chana Bloch, poet and translator (b. 1940)
  - Rich Buckler, comic book artist (b. 1949)
  - Grady C. Cothen, Baptist minister and university president (b. 1920)
  - Herbert L. Meschke, politician and judge (b. 1928)
  - Ed Mierkowicz, baseball player (b. 1924)
  - Wayne Walker, football player and sportscaster (b. 1936)
- May 20
  - Joy Corning, politician; Lieutenant Governor of Iowa from 1991 to 1999 (b. 1932)
  - William Clifford Newman, Roman Catholic prelate (b. 1928)
  - Jean E. Sammet, computer scientist (b. 1928)
  - Lisa Spoonauer, actress (b. 1972)
- May 21
  - Kenny Cordray, rock guitarist and songwriter (b. 1954)
  - Jimmy LaFave, country and folk musician (b. 1955)
  - Wayne Simoneau, politician (b. 1935)
  - Larry Wright, cartoonist (b. 1940)
- May 22
  - Barbara Smith Conrad, operatic mezzo-soprano (b. 1937)
  - Devil His Due, Thoroughbred racehorse (b. 1989)
  - Nicky Hayden, motorcycle racer (b. 1981)
  - Dina Merrill, actress, socialite, and philanthropist (b. 1923)
  - Mickey Roker, jazz drummer (b. 1932)
- May 23
  - Roger Boesche, political theorist (b. 1948)
  - William Carney, politician; U.S. Representative from New York from 1979 to 1987 (b. 1942)
  - Ben Finney, anthropologist and historian (b. 1933)
  - Cortez Kennedy, football player (b. 1968)
  - Peter Lawler, academic and political consultant (b. 1951)
  - Jerry Perenchio, billionaire businessman and philanthropist (b. 1930)
  - Sonny Randle, football player, coach, and sportscaster (b. 1936)
- May 24
  - Ann Birstein, novelist, memoirist, and blogger (b. 1927)
  - Denis Johnson, novelist, poet, and playwright (b. 1949)
  - Juliana Koo, Chinese-born American diplomat and supercentenarian (b. 1905)
  - Jared Martin, actor (b. 1941)
  - Ross Rhoads, evangelical pastor (b. 1932)
  - Sonny West, actor and stuntman (b. 1938)
- May 25
  - Marie Cosindas, photographer (b. 1923)
  - Miguel Méndez, legal scholar (b. 1943)
  - Joel Read, Roman Catholic nun and college president (b. 1925)
  - Saucy Sylvia, Canadian-born comedian and pianist (b. 1920)
- May 26
  - Zbigniew Brzezinski, Polish-born diplomat and political scientist (b. 1928)
  - Jim Bunning, baseball pitcher and politician; U.S. Senator from Kentucky from 1999 to 2011 (b. 1931)
  - Robert Curtis, basketball player (b. 1990)
  - Robert J. Parins, judge and football executive (b. 1918)
- May 27
  - Gregg Allman, singer, songwriter, and musician (b. 1947)
  - Fishel Hershkowitz, Czech-born Hasidic rabbi (b. 1922)
  - Robert McCarley, psychiatrist and sleep researcher (b. 1937)
- May 28
  - Ken Ackerman, radio announcer and news anchor (b. 1922)
  - Frank Deford, sportswriter and novelist (b. 1938)
  - Lawrence Jenkins, World War II pilot and memoirist (b. 1924)
  - Benjamin Melendez, gang leader (b. 1952)
  - Pat Mullins, politician (b. 1938)
- May 30
  - Wendell Burton, actor and television executive (b. 1947)
  - Ken Cooper, football player and coach (b. 1937)
  - Tom Graham, football player (b. 1950)
  - Daniel Kucera, Roman Catholic prelate (b. 1923)
  - Robert Michael Morris, actor (b. 1940)
  - Elena Verdugo, actress (b. 1925)
- May 31
  - Tino Insana, actor, screenwriter, and film producer (b. 1948)
  - Fred J. Koenekamp, cinematographer (b. 1922)
  - Fred Kummerow, German-born biochemist and centenarian (b. 1914)
  - John May, politician (b. 1950)

=== June ===
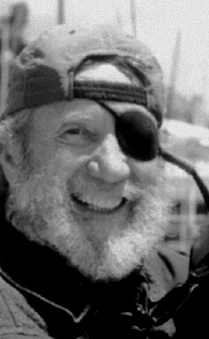
Jack O'Neill

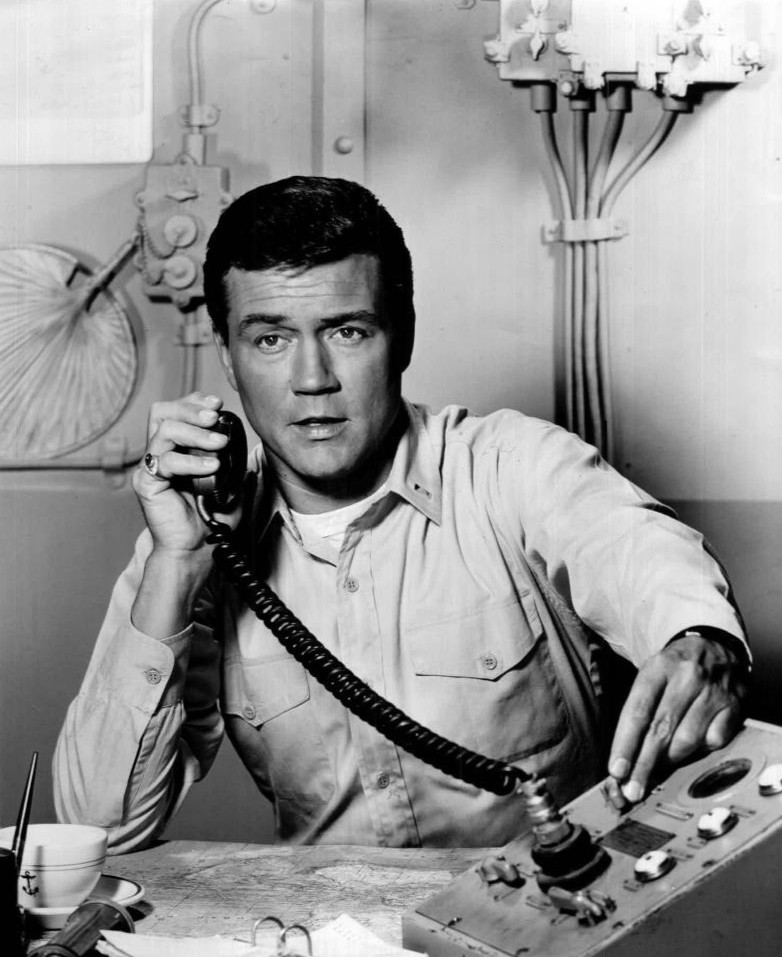
Roger Smith

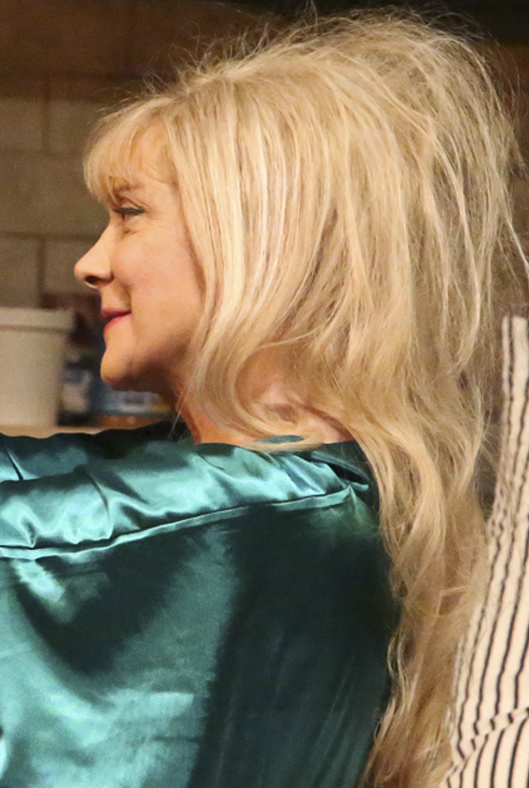
Glenne Headly

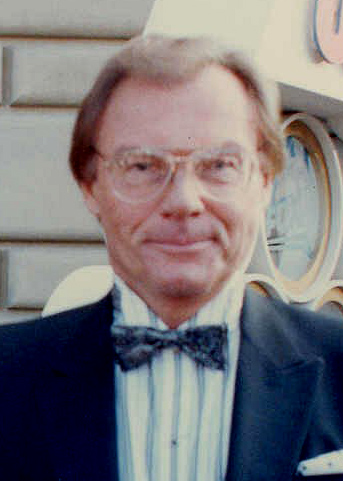
Adam West

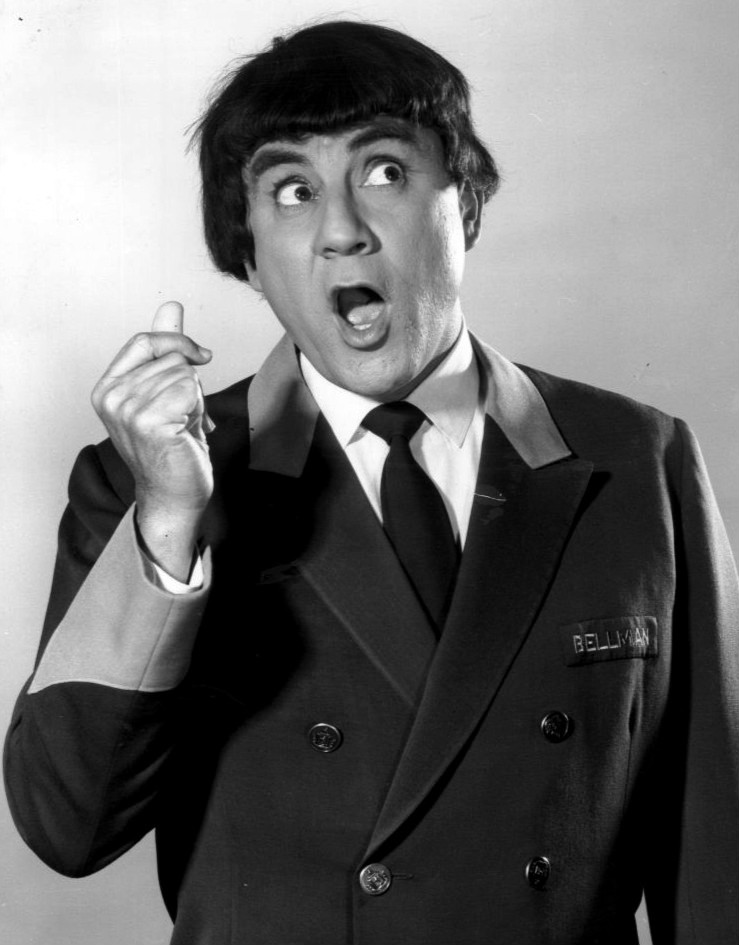
Bill Dana

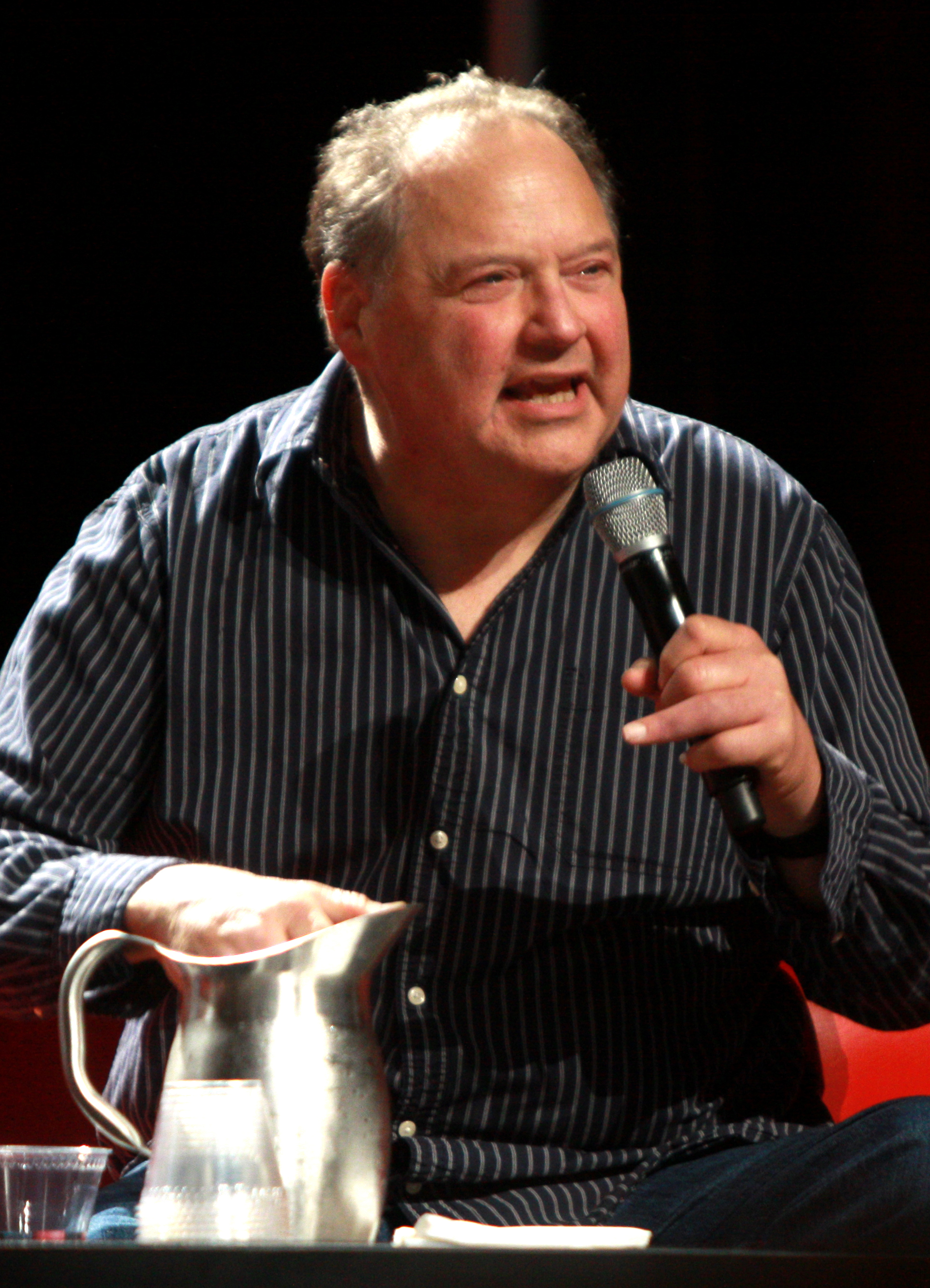
Stephen Furst

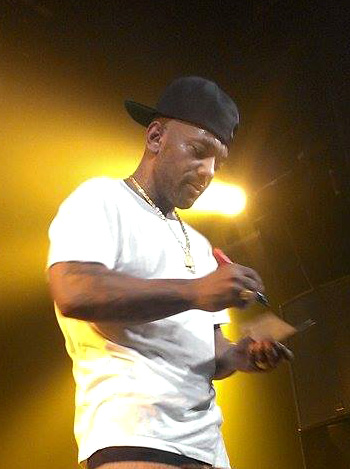
Prodigy

- June 1
  - Jack McCloskey, basketball player, coach, and executive (b. 1925)
  - Charles Simmons, author (b. 1924)
- June 2
  - Gordon Christian, ice hockey player (b. 1927)
  - Iakovos Garmatis, Greek-born Eastern Orthodox metropolitan (b. 1928)
  - Jack O'Neill, businessman (b. 1923)
  - Herm Starrette, baseball player (b. 1936)
- June 3
  - David Choby, Roman Catholic prelate (b. 1947)
  - Sara Ehrman, political activist (b. 1919)
  - James E. Martin, educator and university president (b. 1932)
  - Jimmy Piersall, baseball player (b. 1929)
  - Lawrence Weed, physician and educator (b. 1923)
- June 4
  - Thomas C. Perry, businessman and politician (b. 1941)
  - Roger Smith, actor, producer, and screenwriter (b. 1932)
  - Jack Trout, business and marketing theorist (b. 1935)
- June 5
  - Kathryn Stripling Byer, poet (b. 1944)
  - Victor Gold, journalist and political consultant (b. 1928)
  - Marilyn Hall, Canadian-born television and theatre producer (b. 1927)
  - William Krisel, Chinese-born architect (b. 1924)
  - Rita Riggs, costume designer (b. 1930)
- June 6
  - John Bower, skier (b. 1940)
  - Walter Noll, German-born mathematician (b. 1925)
- June 7
  - James Hardy, football player (b. 1985)
  - Holy Bull, Thoroughbred racehorse (b. 1991)
  - Robert S. Leiken, political scientist (b. 1939)
  - Earl Lestz, film and television executive (b. 1939)
  - Patsy Terrell, politician (b. 1962)
- June 8
  - Ervin A. Gonzalez, lawyer (b. 1960)
  - Glenne Headly, actress (b. 1955)
  - Norro Wilson, country musician, songwriter, and producer (b. 1938)
- June 9
  - Vic Edelbrock Jr., businessman (b. 1936)
  - Adam West, actor (b. 1928)
  - John C. Yoder, judge and politician (b. 1951)
- June 10
  - Herma Hill Kay, law professor and academic administrator (b. 1934)
  - Jerry Nelson, astronomer (b. 1944)
  - Grace Berg Schaible, lawyer and politician (b. 1925)
  - Samuel V. Wilson, U.S. Army general; Director of the Defense Intelligence Agency 1976–77 (b. 1923)
- June 11
  - Herman T. Costello, politician (b. 1920)
  - David Fromkin, lawyer and historian (b. 1932)
  - Rosalie Sorrels, folk singer-songwriter (b. 1933)
- June 12
  - Morton N. Cohen, author and literary scholar (b. 1921)
  - David W. Frank, thespian and educator (b. 1949)
  - Jim Galton, business executive (b. 1924)
  - Marvin Herman Shoob, U.S. federal judge (b. 1923)
- June 13
  - Philip Gossett, musicologist (b. 1941)
  - A. R. Gurney, playwright and novelist (b. 1930)
  - Hansel, Thoroughbred racehorse (b. 1988)
- June 14
  - Arthur J. Jackson, U.S. Marine Corps officer and Medal of Honor recipient (b. 1924)
  - Don Matthews, football player and CFL coach (b. 1939)
- June 15
  - David L. Armstrong, politician (b. 1941)
  - Bill Dana, comedian, actor, and screenwriter (b. 1924)
  - Phyllis A. Kravitch, federal judge (b. 1920)
- June 16
  - John G. Avildsen, film director (b. 1935)
  - Stephen Furst, actor and film and television director (b. 1955)
  - Curt Hanson, politician (b. 1943)
- June 17
  - Elias Burstein, physicist (b. 1917)
  - Gailanne Cariddi, politician (b. 1953)
  - Larry Grantham, football player (b. 1938)
  - Thara Memory, jazz trumpeter (b. 1949)
  - Venus Ramey, Miss America winner, farmer, and activist (b. 1924)
- June 18
  - Hans Breder, German-born artist and educator (b. 1935)
  - Tony Liscio, football player (b. 1940)
  - Chris Murrell, jazz and gospel singer (b. 1956)
  - Simon Nelson, mass murderer (b. 1931)
- June 19
  - Tony DiCicco, soccer player and coach (b. 1948)
  - Otto Warmbier, college student and North Korea detainee (b. 1994)
- June 20
  - Roger D. Abrahams, folklorist (b. 1933)
  - Prodigy, rapper (b. 1974)
- June 21
  - Belton Richard, Cajun accordionist (b. 1939)
  - Robert M. Shoemaker, U.S. Army general (b. 1924)
  - Howard Witt, actor (b. 1932)
- June 22
  - Richard Benson, photographer, printer, and educator (b. 1943)
  - Frank Kush, football player and coach (b. 1929)
  - Keith Loneker, football player and actor (b. 1971)
  - Sheila Michaels, feminist and civil rights activist (b. 1939)
  - John R. Quinn, Roman Catholic prelate (b. 1929)
  - John E. Sarno, physician and writer (b. 1923)
  - Sandy Tatum, attorney and golf administrator (b. 1920)
- June 23
  - Gabe Pressman, television journalist (b. 1924)
  - Meir Zlotowitz, Orthodox Jewish rabbi, author, and translator (b. 1943)
- June 24
  - Loren Janes, stuntman (b. 1931)
  - Parker Lee McDonald, judge (b. 1924)
- June 25
  - Hal Fryar, actor and television personality (b. 1927)
  - Skip Homeier, American actor (b. 1930)
- June 26 – Doug Peterson, yacht designer (b. 1945)
- June 27
  - Geri Allen, jazz pianist, composer, and educator (b. 1957)
  - Peter L. Berger, sociologist and theologian (b. 1929)
  - Better Talk Now, Thoroughbred racehorse (b. 1999)
  - Tom Corcoran, alpine skier (b. 1931)
  - Mary Evelyn Blagg Huey, educator and college president (b. 1922)
  - Anthony Young, baseball pitcher (b. 1966)
- June 28 – Phil Cohran, jazz trumpeter (b. 1927)
- June 29
  - Chuck Renslow, businessman and LGBT activist (b. 1929)
  - Michael Vickery, historian (b. 1931)
- June 30
  - Russ Adams, tennis photographer (b. 1930)
  - Mitchell Henry, football player (b. 1992)
  - Darrall Imhoff, basketball player (b. 1938)
  - Max Runager, football player (b. 1956)

=== July ===
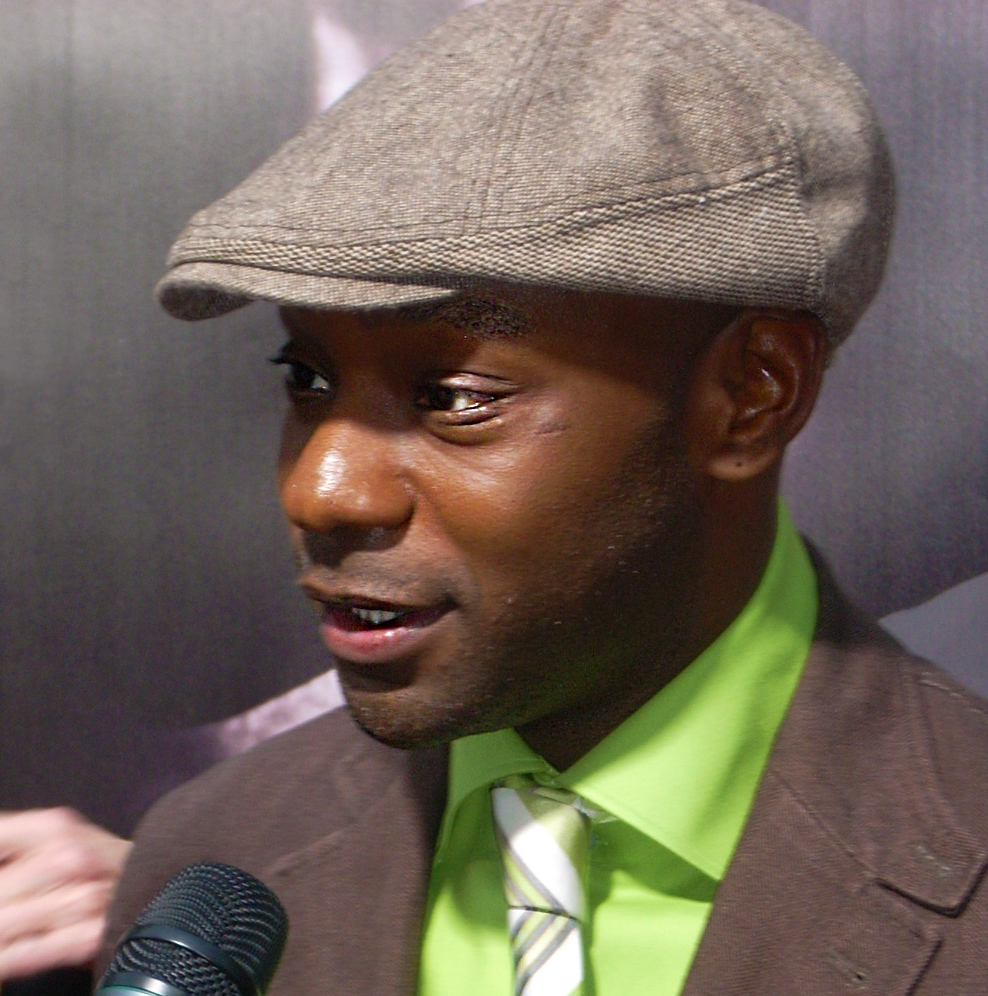
Nelsan Ellis

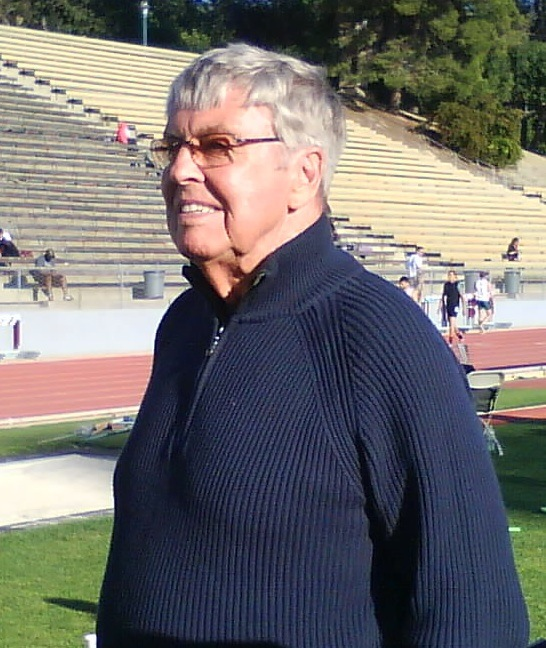
Jim Bush

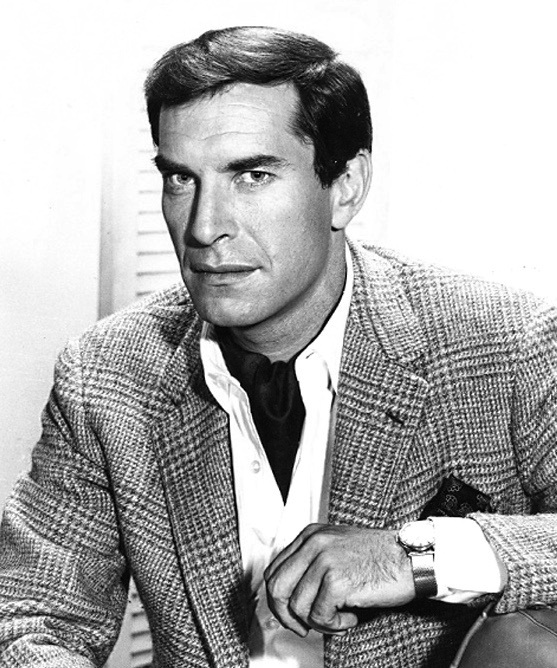
Martin Landau

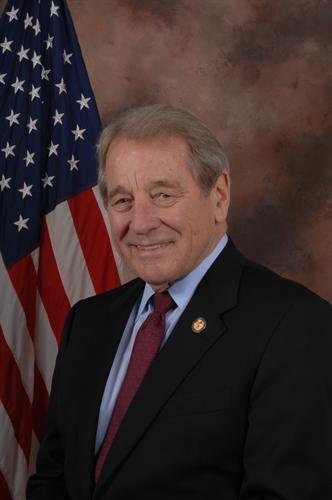
Ralph Regula

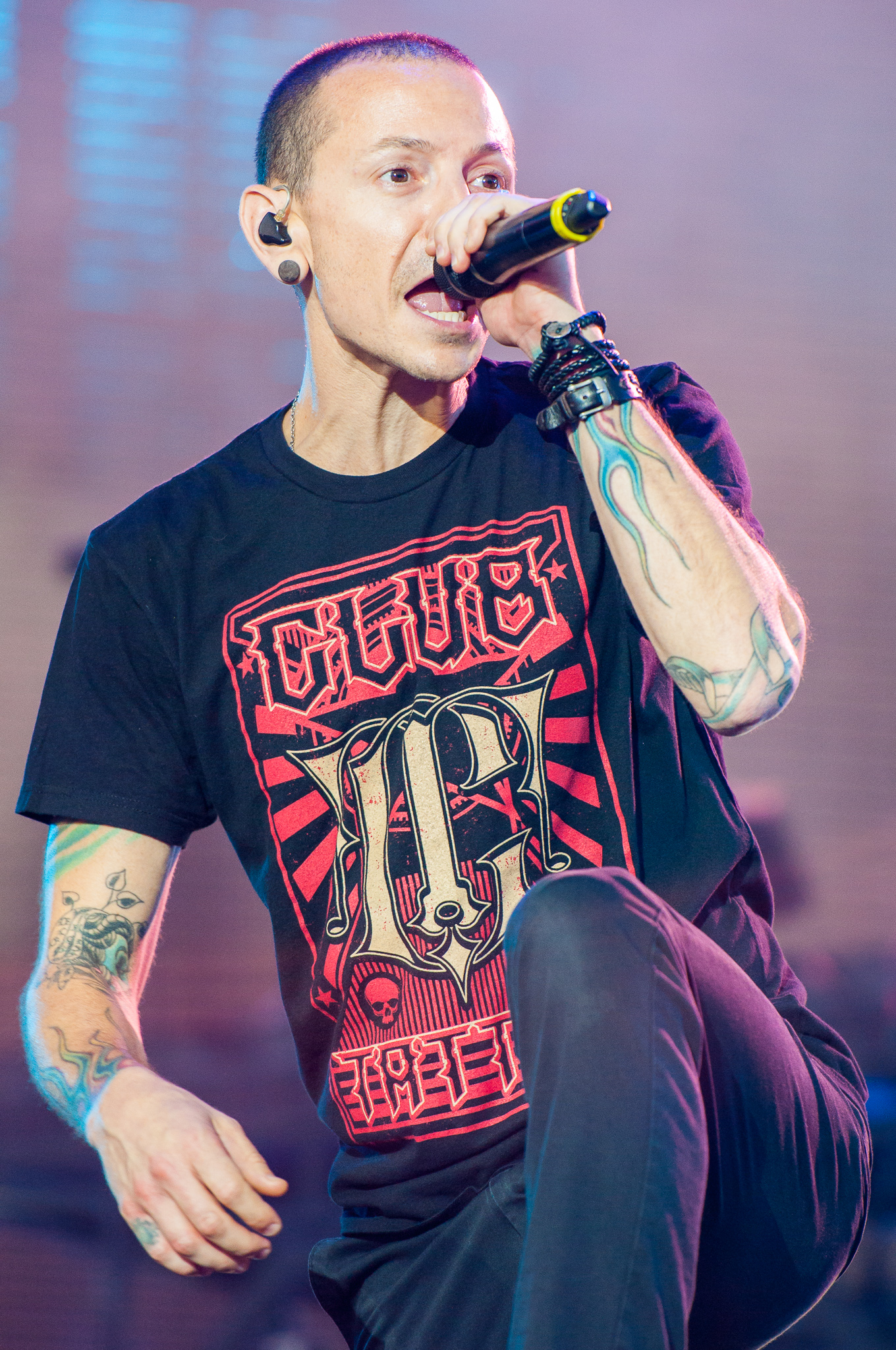
Chester Bennington

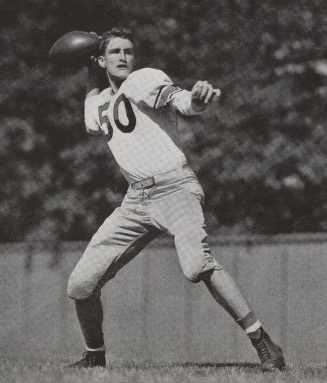
Bob DeMoss

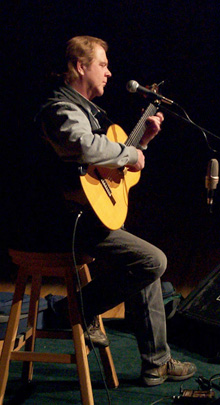
Michael Johnson

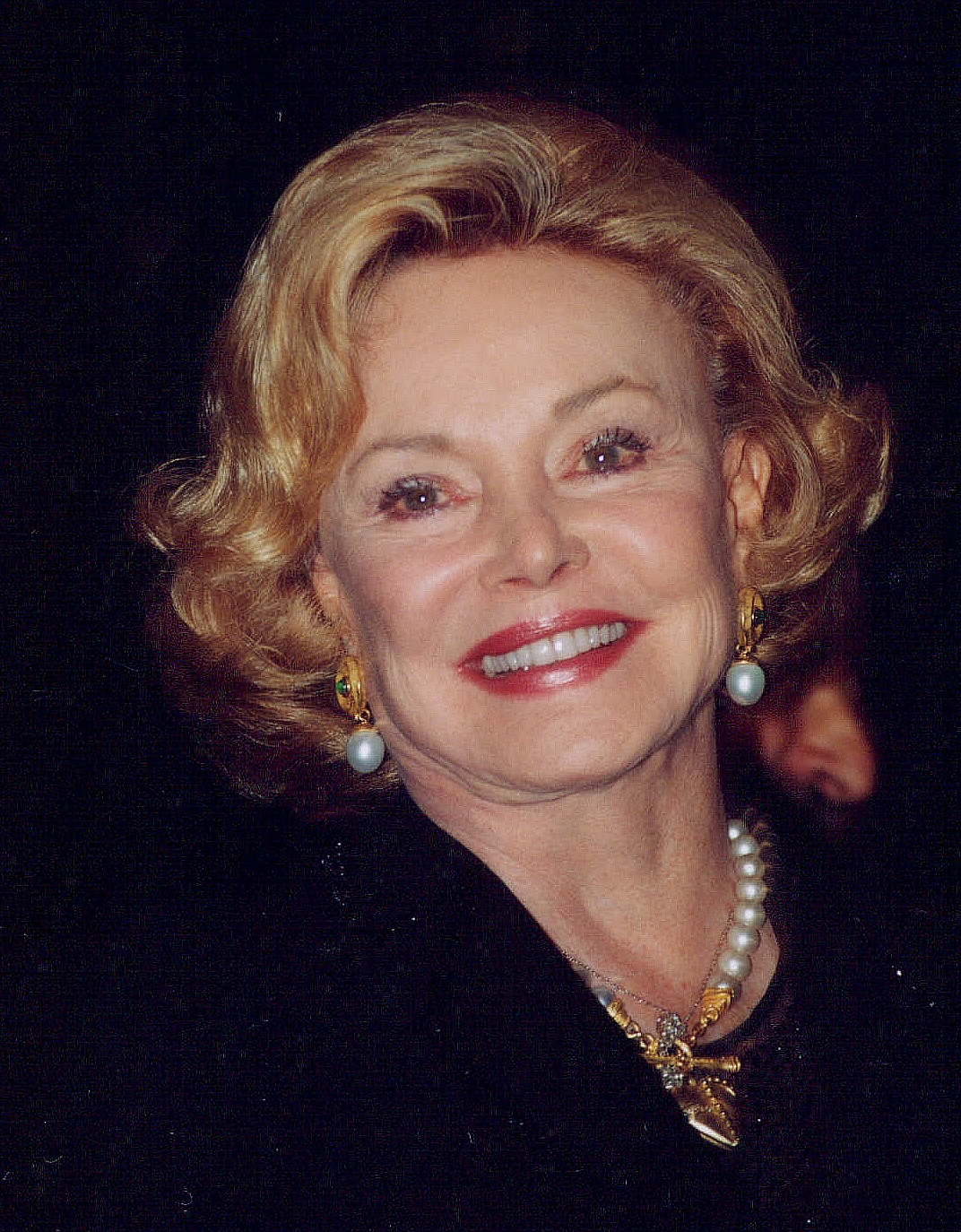
Barbara Sinatra

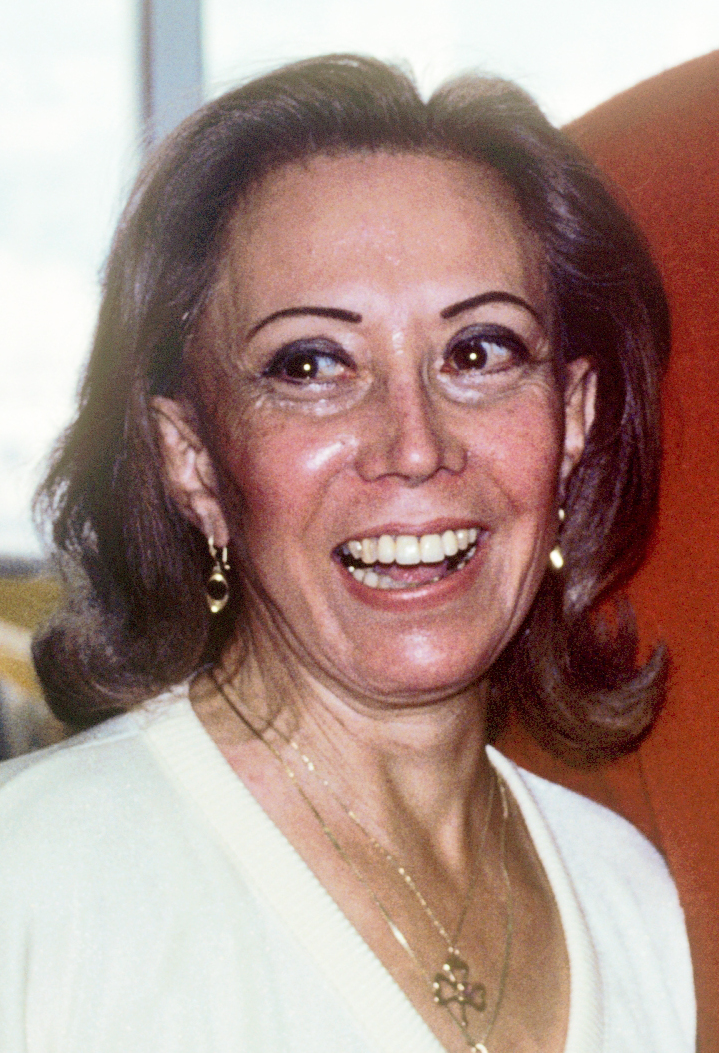
June Foray

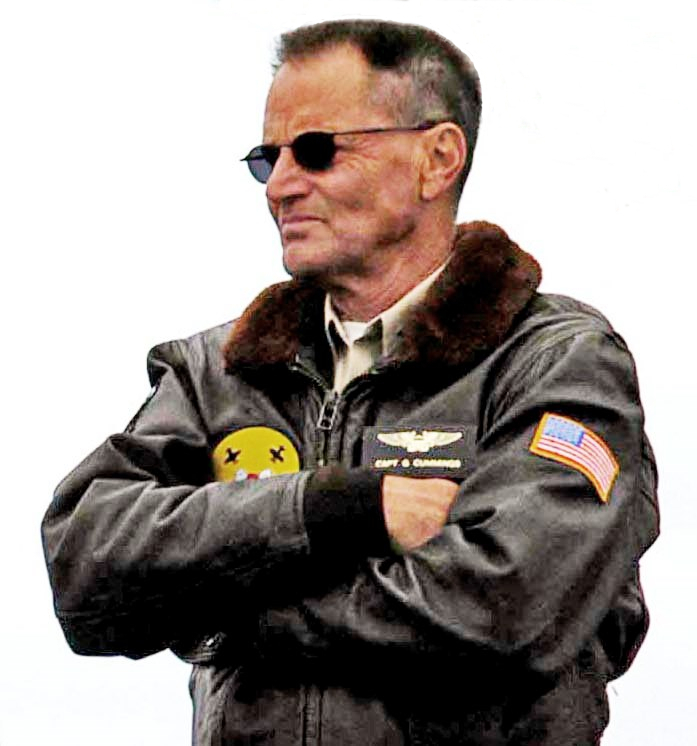
Sam Shepard

- July 1
  - Norman Dorsen, jurist and civil rights activist (b. 1930)
  - Paul Hardin III, academic administrator (b. 1931)
  - Stevie Ryan, actress (b. 1984)
- July 2
  - Jack Collom, poet (b. 1931)
  - David W. Vincent, baseball writer and statistician (b. 1949)
- July 3
  - Spencer Johnson, self-help writer (b. 1938)
  - Theodore Kanavas, politician (b. 1961)
- July 4
  - John Blackwell, jazz and funk drummer (b. 1973)
  - Gene Conley, baseball and basketball player (b. 1930)
  - Ji-Tu Cumbuka, actor (b. 1940)
  - John S. Palmore, judge (b. 1917)
  - David Yewdall, sound editor (b. 1951)
- July 5 – Tinners Way, Thoroughbred racehorse (b. 1990)
- July 6
  - Willie Stevenson Glanton, lawyer and politician (b. 1922)
  - Joan Boocock Lee, British-born voice actress (b. 1922)
  - William Morva, convicted murderer (b. 1982)
- July 7
  - Claude Hall, journalist and magazine editor
  - Diego E. Hernández, U.S. Navy officer (b. 1934)
  - Kenneth Silverman, biographer (b. 1936)
- July 8
  - Nelsan Ellis, actor (b. 1977)
  - Bob Lubbers, comics artist (b. 1922)
- July 9
  - Wally Burr, voice actor and television director (b. 1926)
  - Ed Crawford, football player (b. 1934)
  - Neal Patterson, business executive (b. 1949)
  - Jack Shaheen, cultural critic (b. 1935)
  - David Wilstein, real estate developer and philanthropist (b. 1928)
- July 10
  - Peter Alfond, billionaire investor and philanthropist (b. 1952)
  - Jim Bush, track and field coach (b. 1926)
- July 11
  - Joseph Fire Crow, Cheyenne flutist (b. 1959)
  - George W. BonDurant, preacher and academic administrator (b. 1915)
- July 12
  - Chuck Blazer, soccer administrator (b. 1945)
  - S. Allen Counter, neuroscientist, polar explorer, and university administrator (b. 1944)
  - Sam Glanzman, comics artist and writer (b. 1924)
- July 13
  - Charles Bachman, computer scientist (b. 1924)
  - Keith Baird, Barbadian-born educator and linguist (b. 1923)
  - Gertrude Poe, journalist and lawyer (b. 1915)
  - Carl E. Reichardt, banking executive (b. 1931)
- July 14
  - Mahi Beamer, singer, composer, and dancer (b. 1928)
  - Wm. Theodore de Bary, sinologist (b. 1919)
  - William "Hootie" Johnson, banker and golf administrator (b. 1931)
- July 15
  - Warrick L. Carter, music educator and college administrator (b. 1942)
  - Martin Landau, actor (b. 1928)
  - Babe Parilli, football player (b. 1930)
  - Bob Wolff, sportscaster (b. 1920)
- July 16
  - Jerry Bird, basketball player (b. 1934)
  - Tom Mitchell, football player (b. 1944)
  - Clancy Sigal, writer (b. 1926)
- July 17
  - Evan Helmuth, actor (b. 1977)
  - Raymond Sackler, physician and philanthropist (b. 1920)
- July 18
  - Ben's Cat, Thoroughbred racehorse (b. 2006)
  - Jean Murrell Capers, judge and centenarian (b. 1913)
  - Herbert Needleman, pediatrician and psychiatrist (b. 1927)
  - Andrew Paulson, writer, photographer, and entrepreneur (b. 1958)
  - John Rheinecker, baseball player (b. 1979)
  - Red West, actor, stunt performer, and songwriter (b. 1936)
- July 19
  - Jake Butcher, banker and politician (b. 1936)
  - Charles Weston Houck, federal judge (b. 1933)
  - Ralph Regula, U.S. Representative from Ohio (b. 1924)
  - Fenwick Smith, classical flutist (b. 1949)
- July 20
  - Chester Bennington, rock singer and songwriter (b. 1976)
  - Jesse Kalisher, art photographer (b. 1962)
  - Kenneth Jay Lane, jewelry designer and socialite (b. 1932)
  - Joseph Rago, political writer and journalist (b. 1983)
  - Jonathan Shurberg, lawyer and politician (b. 1963)
- July 21
  - Howard Eichenbaum, psychologist and neuroscientist (b. 1947)
  - John Heard, actor (b. 1945)
  - Lonnie "Bo" Pilgrim, businessman (b. 1928)
  - Stubbs, cat and honorary mayor (b. 1997)
- July 22
  - Margo Chase, graphic designer (b. 1958)
  - Haddon Robinson, evangelical author and seminary leader (b. 1931)
  - Jim Vance, television news anchor (b. 1942)
- July 23
  - Dave Cogdill, politician (b. 1950)
  - Bob DeMoss, football player and coach (b. 1927)
  - Thomas Fleming, historian and novelist (b. 1927)
  - John Kundla, basketball coach (b. 1916)
  - Snooty, manatee (b. 1948)
  - Flo Steinberg, comics publisher (b. 1939)
- July 25
  - Gretel Bergmann, German-born high jumper (b. 1914)
  - Marian Diamond, neuroscientist (b. 1926)
  - Buddy Fletcher, politician (b. 1932)
  - Michael Johnson, singer-songwriter (b. 1944)
  - Barbara Sinatra, model and showgirl (b. 1927)
  - Lyle Smith, football and basketball player and coach (b. 1916)
  - Billy Joe Walker Jr., country and New Age guitarist, songwriter, and record producer (b. 1952)
- July 26
  - Cool "Disco" Dan, graffiti artist (b. 1969)
  - Patti Deutsch, actress and comedian (b. 1943)
  - June Foray, voice actress (b. 1917)
  - Lawrence Pezzulo, diplomat (b. 1926)
  - Ronald Phillips, convicted murderer (b. 1973)
- July 27
  - Cheri Maples, police officer, peace activist, and dharma instructor (b. 1952)
  - D. L. Menard, Cajun musician (b. 1932)
  - Sam Shepard, playwright, actor, screenwriter, and director (b. 1943)
  - Marty Sklar, Disney imagineer (b. 1934)
- July 28
  - John G. Morris, photo editor (b. 1916)
  - Warren Keith Urbom, federal judge (b. 1925)
- July 29
  - Dave Grayson, football player (b. 1939)
  - Lee May, baseball player (b. 1943)
  - Piotr S. Wandycz, Polish-born historian (b. 1923)
- July 30 – Steadman Upham, archaeologist and university president (b. 1949)
- July 31
  - Ray Albright, banker and politician (b. 1934)
  - Chuck Loeb, jazz guitarist (b. 1955)
  - Michael O'Nan, mathematician (b. 1943)

=== August ===
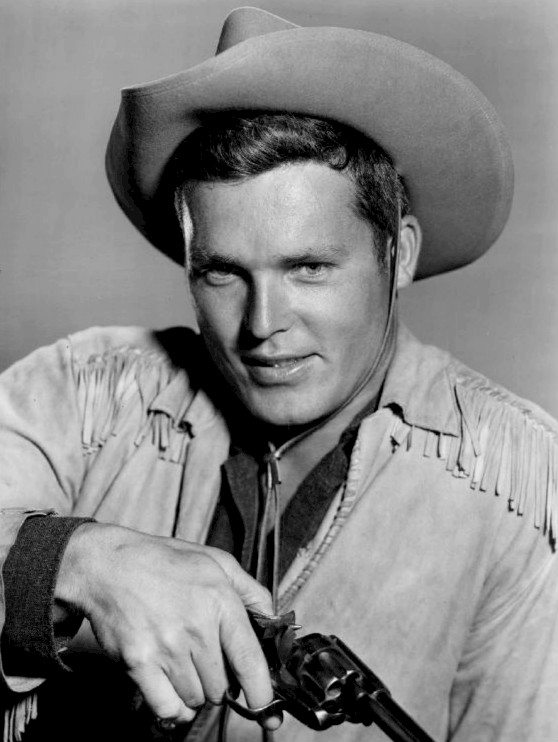
Ty Hardin

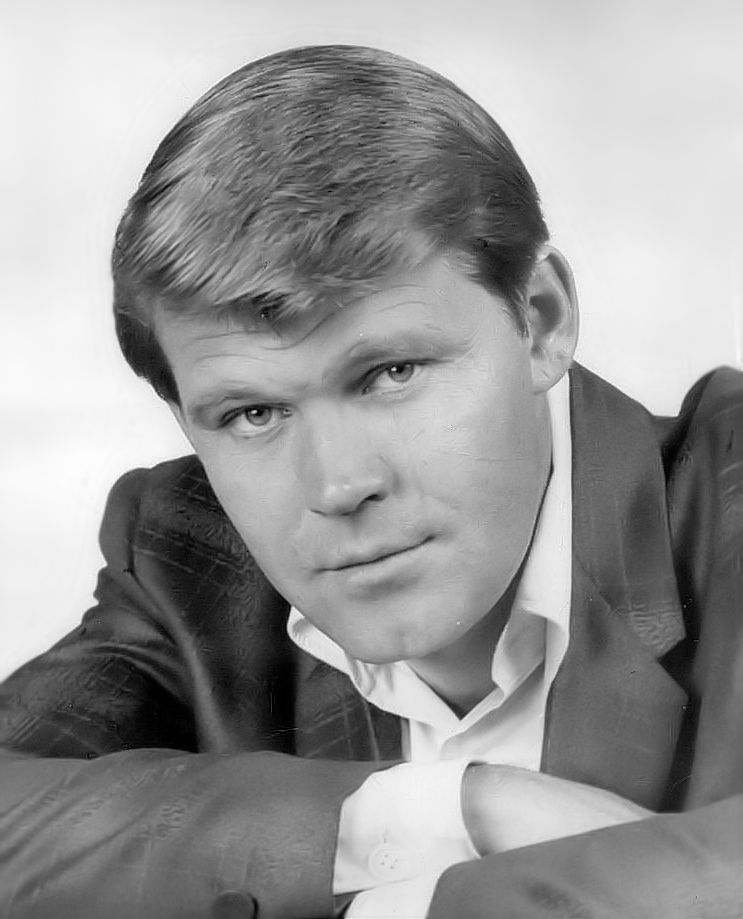
Glen Campbell

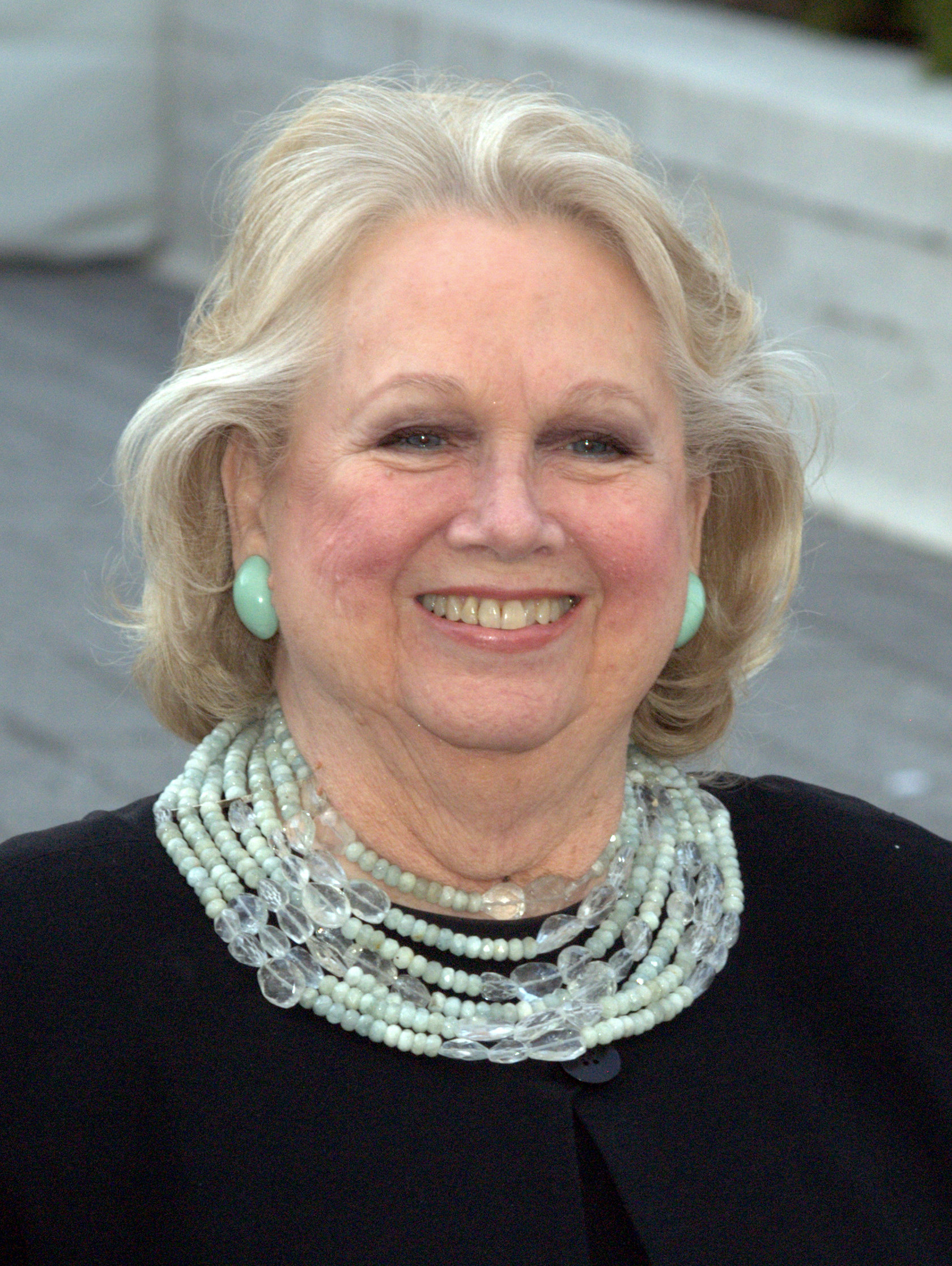
Barbara Cook

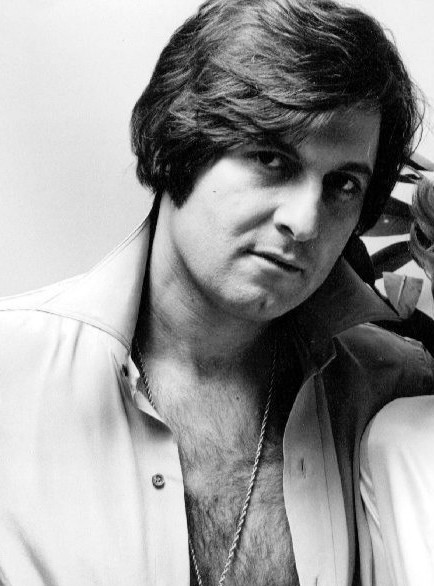
Joseph Bologna

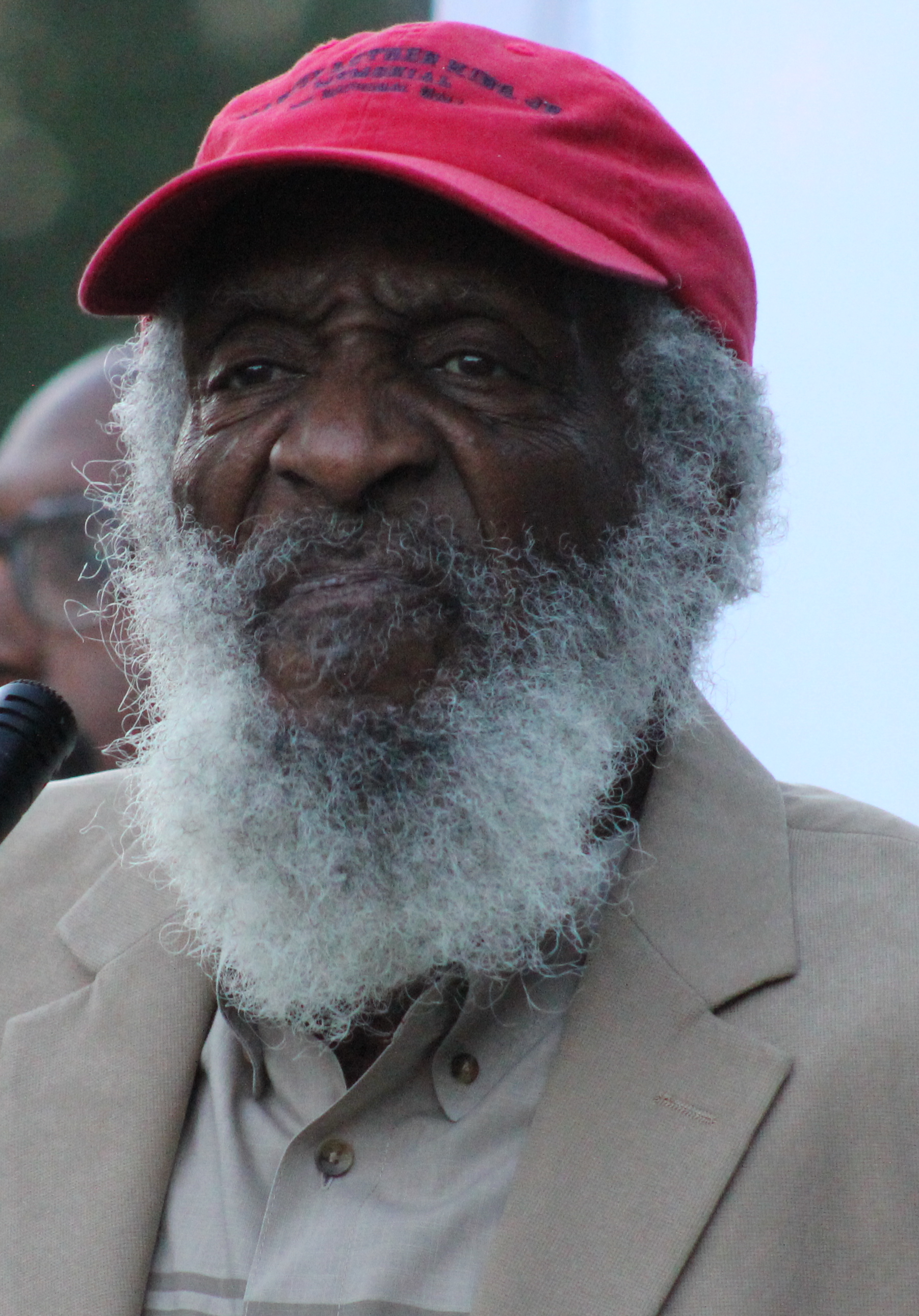
Dick Gregory

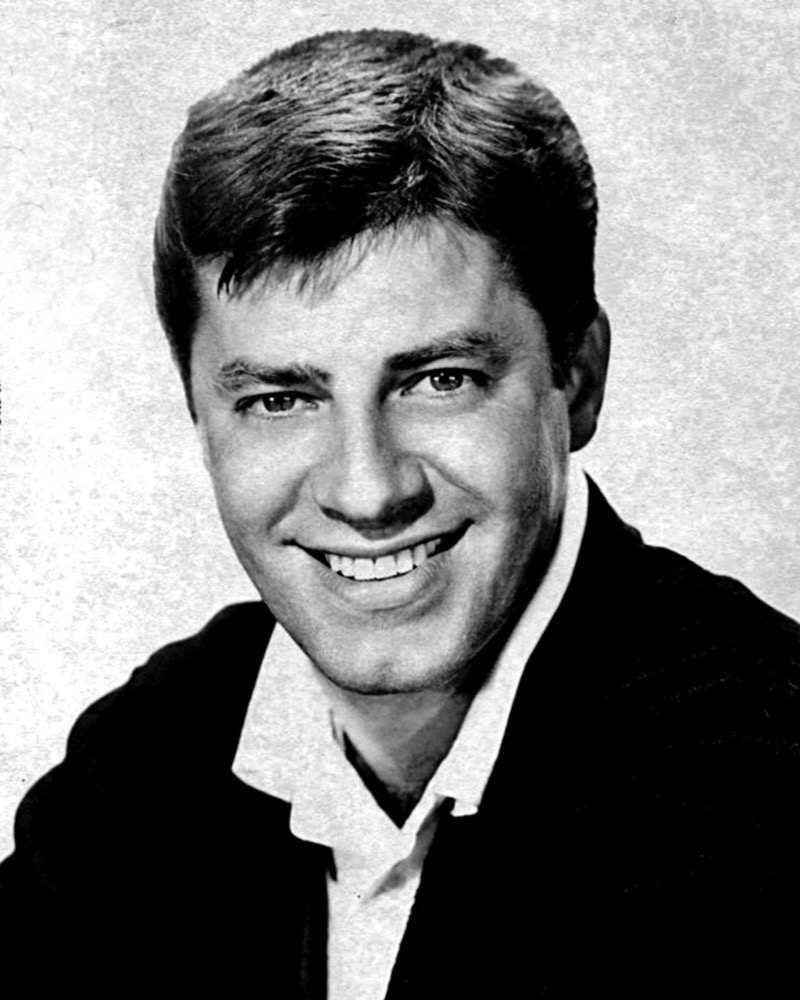
Jerry Lewis

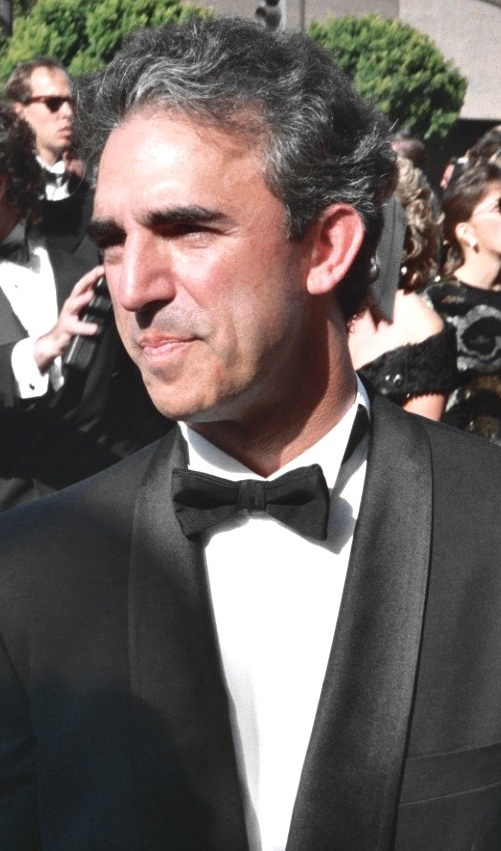
Jay Thomas

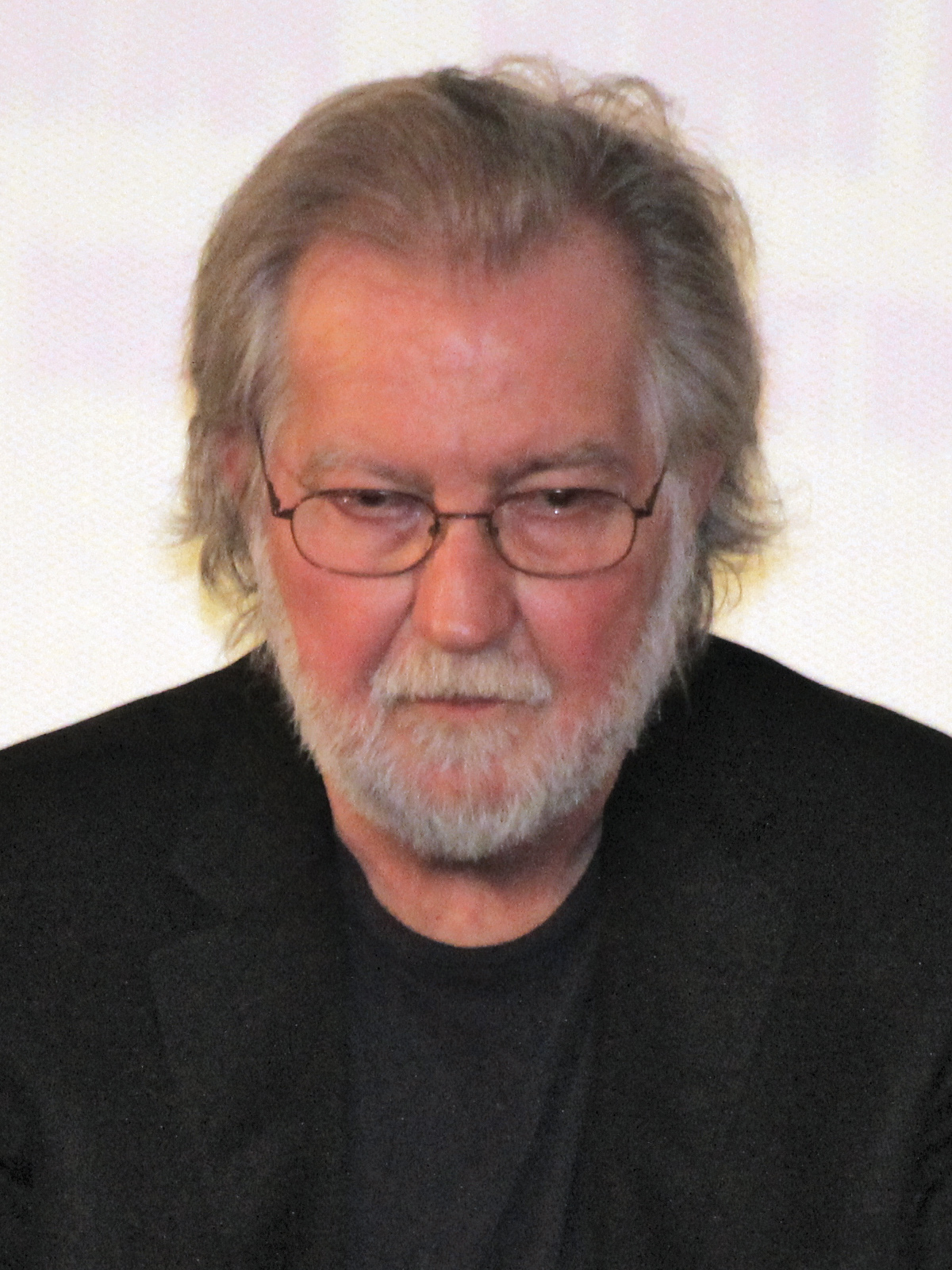
Tobe Hooper

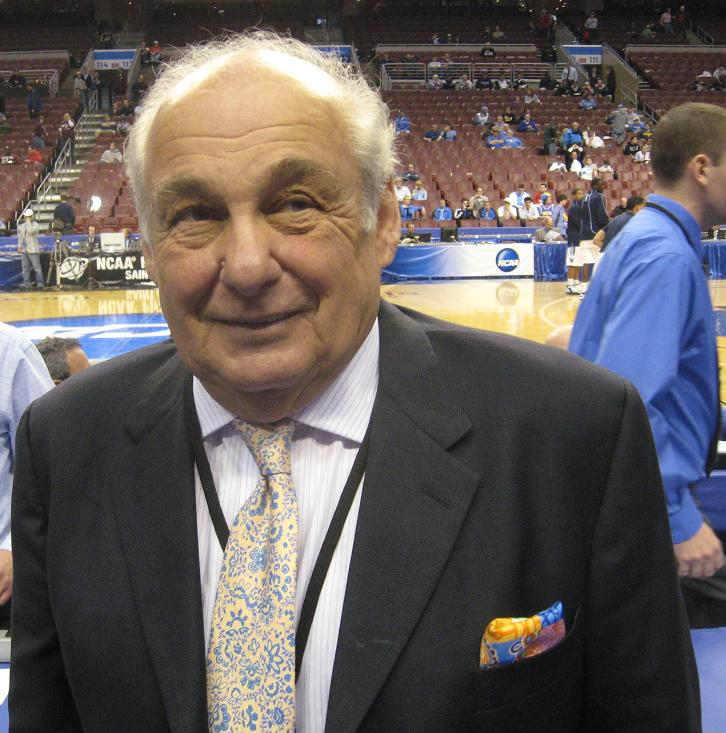
Rollie Massimino

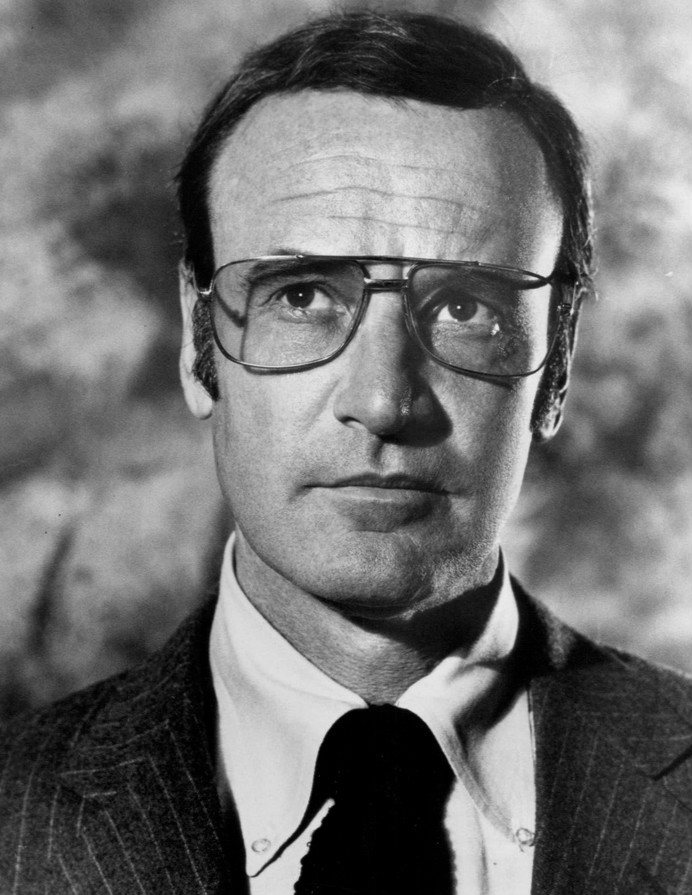
Richard Anderson

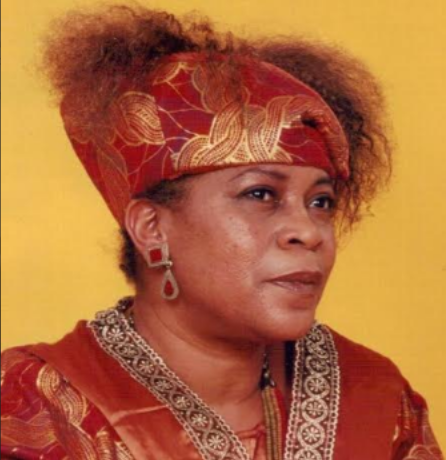
Novella Nelson

- August 1
  - Jeffrey Brotman, attorney and entrepreneur (b. 1942)
  - Mariann Mayberry, actress (b. 1965)
  - Bud Moore, racing driver (b. 1941)
  - John Reaves, football player (b. 1950)
- August 2
  - Marshall Goldman, economist (b. 1930)
  - Judith Jones, book editor and food writer (b. 1924)
  - Daniel Licht, film composer (b. 1957)
  - Jim Marrs, journalist and conspiracy theorist (b. 1943)
  - Ara Parseghian, football player and coach (b. 1923)
- August 3
  - Richard Dudman, journalist (b. 1918)
  - Ty Hardin, actor (b. 1930)
  - Dickie Hemric, basketball player (b. 1933)
  - Alan Peckolick, graphic designer (b. 1940)
- August 4
  - Walter Levin, German-born violinist and music teacher (b. 1924)
  - Jessy Serrata, Tejano singer and musician (b. 1953)
- August 5
  - George Bundy Smith, lawyer and judge (b. 1937)
  - Mark White, lawyer and politician; 43rd Governor of Texas (b. 1940)
- August 6
  - Darren Daulton, baseball player (b. 1962)
  - Dick Locher, cartoonist (b. 1929)
  - David Maslanka, composer (b. 1949)
  - Daniel McKinnon, ice hockey player and Olympic silver medalist (b. 1922)
- August 7
  - Don Baylor, baseball player and manager (b. 1949)
  - Chantek, hybrid orangutan (b. 1977)
  - Patsy Ticer, politician (b. 1935)
- August 8
  - Glen Campbell, country singer-songwriter and guitarist (b. 1936)
  - Barbara Cook, musical theatre singer and actress (b. 1927)
  - Max De Pree, businessman and motivational writer (b. 1924)
  - Arlene Gottfried, photographer (b. 1950)
  - Ken Kaiser, American League umpire (b. 1945)
  - Dick MacPherson, football coach (b. 1930)
  - Cathleen Synge Morawetz, Canadian-born mathematician (b. 1923)
- August 9
  - Al McCandless, politician; U.S. Representative from California (1983–1995) (b. 1927)
  - Robert Joseph Shaheen, Maronite Catholic bishop (b. 1937)
  - Janie Shores, Supreme Court of Alabama justice (b. 1932)
- August 11 – Neil Chayet, lawyer and radio personality (b. 1939)
- August 12 – John F. Russo, politician (b. 1933)
- August 13
  - Joseph Bologna, actor (b. 1934)
  - Nick Mantis, basketball player (b. 1935)
- August 14
  - Frank Broyles, football player and coach (b. 1924)
  - Franklin Cleckley, law professor and judge (b. 1940)
  - Benard Ighner, jazz singer and musician (b. 1945)
- August 15
  - Vern Ehlers, politician; U.S. Representative from Michigan (1993–2011) (b. 1934)
  - Kasatka, killer whale (b. 1976)
- August 16
  - Tom Hawkins, basketball player (b. 1936)
  - Ross Johnson, politician and lawyer (b. 1939)
  - Lester Williams, football player (b. 1959)
- August 17
  - Francis X. DiLorenzo, Roman Catholic prelate (b. 1942)
  - Sonny Landham, actor and stunt performer (b. 1941)
  - M. T. Liggett, folk sculptor (b. 1930)
- August 18
  - Sonny Burgess, rockabilly singer and guitarist (b. 1929)
  - Arthur J. Finkelstein, political consultant (b. 1945)
  - Venero Mangano, mobster (b. 1921)
- August 19
  - Charles R. Bentley, glaciologist and geophysicist (b. 1929)
  - Janusz Glowacki, Polish-born playwright and screenwriter (b. 1938)
  - Dick Gregory, comedian and civil rights activist (b. 1932)
  - Jorge Rodriguez-Chomat, Cuban-born politician and judge (b. 1945)
  - Ed Sharockman, football player (b. 1939)
  - Bea Wain, jazz singer (b. 1917)
- August 20
  - Fredell Lack, classical violinist (b. 1922)
  - Jerry Lewis, comedian, actor, filmmaker, and humanitarian (b. 1926)
  - Shane Sieg, racing driver (b. 1982)
- August 21
  - Dianne de Las Casas, Philippine-born writer and storyteller (b. 1970)
  - Greg Evers, politician (b. 1955)
  - Thomas Meehan, playwright and screenwriter (b. 1929)
  - Don Nichols, motorsport team owner (b. 1924)
  - Felo Ramírez, Cuban-born sportscaster (b. 1923)
- August 22
  - John Abercrombie, jazz guitarist (b. 1944)
  - Thomas W. Blackwell, politician (b. 1958)
  - Jim Whelan, politician (b. 1948)
- August 23
  - George A. Keyworth II, nuclear physicist (b. 1939)
  - Joe Klein, baseball executive (b. 1942)
  - Jack Rosenthal, journalist and editor (b. 1935)
  - Susan Vreeland, novelist (b. 1946)
- August 24
  - Cecil Andrus, politician; 26th and 28th Governor of Idaho (b. 1931)
  - Thomas Docking, lawyer and politician (b. 1954)
  - Charles Robertson, politician (b. 1934)
  - Jay Thomas, actor and talk radio host (b. 1948)
- August 25
  - Margaret Moser, journalist and music critic (b. 1954)
  - Rich Piana, bodybuilder (b. 1971)
- August 26
  - Tobe Hooper, film director, screenwriter and producer (b. 1943)
  - Howard Kaminsky, publisher, novelist, and film producer (b. 1940)
  - Bernard Pomerance, playwright and poet (b. 1940)
  - Lacey E. Putney, politician (b. 1928)
- August 27
  - James Dickson Phillips Jr., federal judge (b. 1922)
  - Syd Silverman, magazine publisher (b. 1932)
- August 28
  - Bobby Boyd, football player (b. 1937)
  - Jud Heathcote, basketball coach (b. 1927)
  - David Torrence, Peruvian-American runner (b. 1985)
- August 29 – Larry Elgart, jazz saxophonist and bandleader (b. 1922)
- August 30
  - Peter Diamondstone, lawyer and politician (b. 1934)
  - Louise Hay, motivational author and publisher (b. 1926)
  - Rollie Massimino, basketball player and coach (b. 1934)
  - Tim Mickelson, rower and Olympic silver medalist (b. 1948)
- August 31
  - Richard Anderson, actor (b. 1926)
  - William Beik, historian (b. 1941)
  - Novella Nelson, actress and singer (b. 1938)

=== September ===
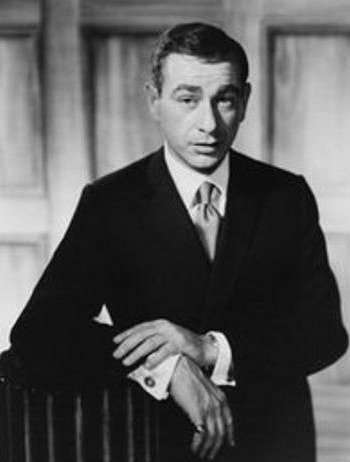
Shelley Berman

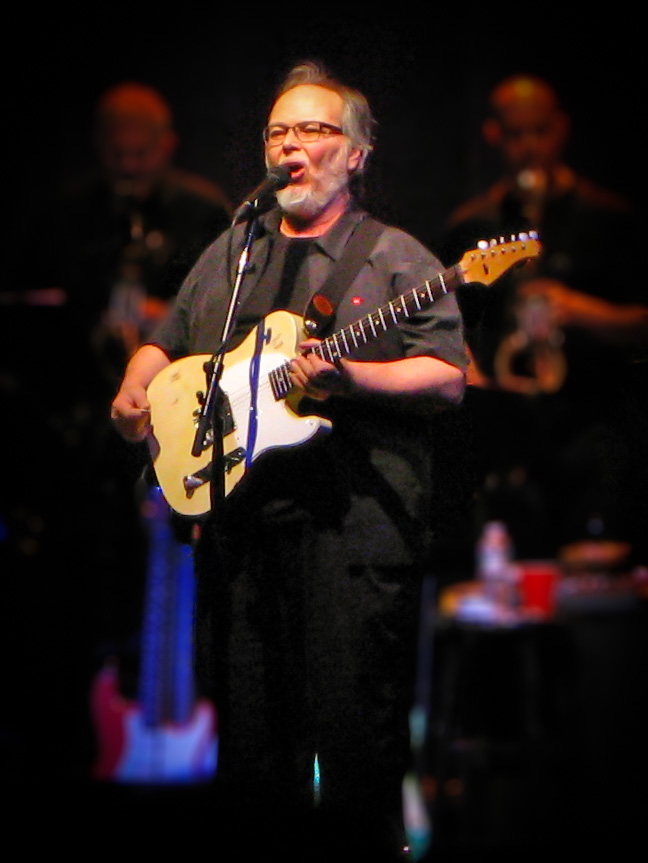
Walter Becker

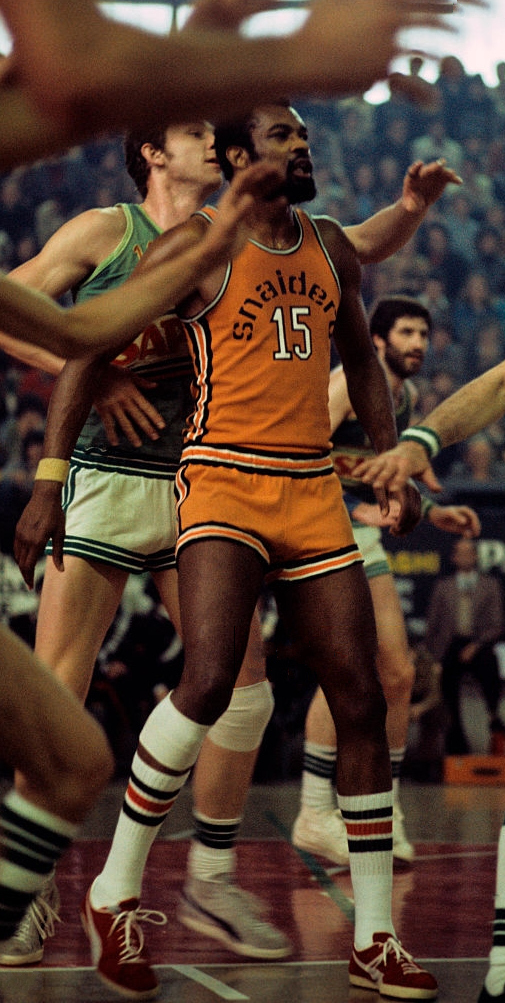
Jim McDaniels

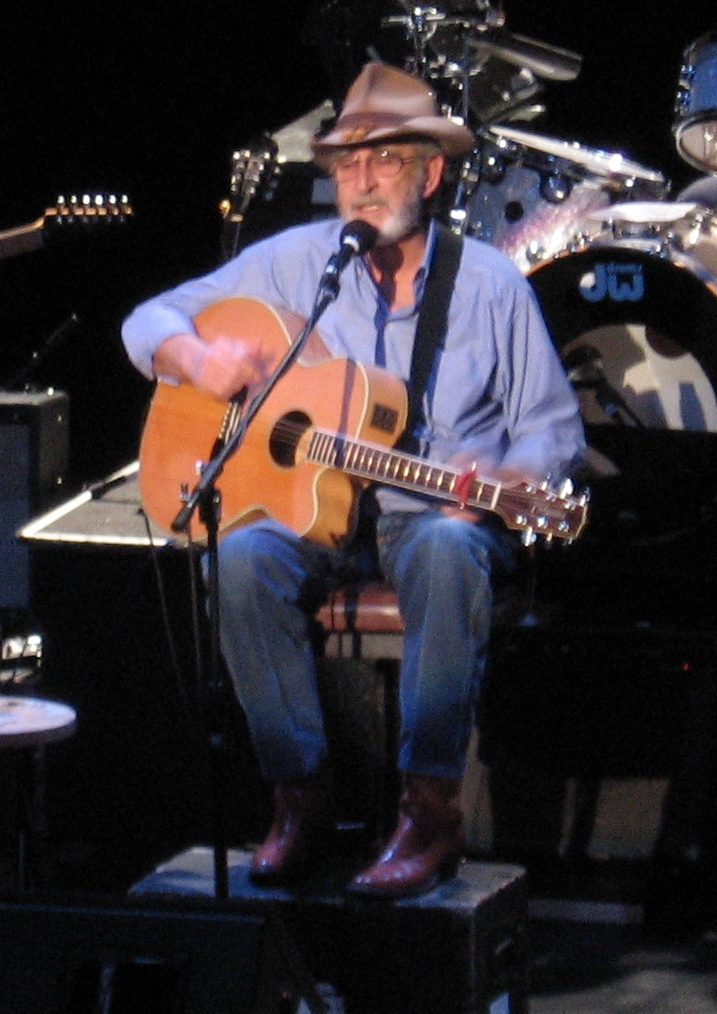
Don Williams

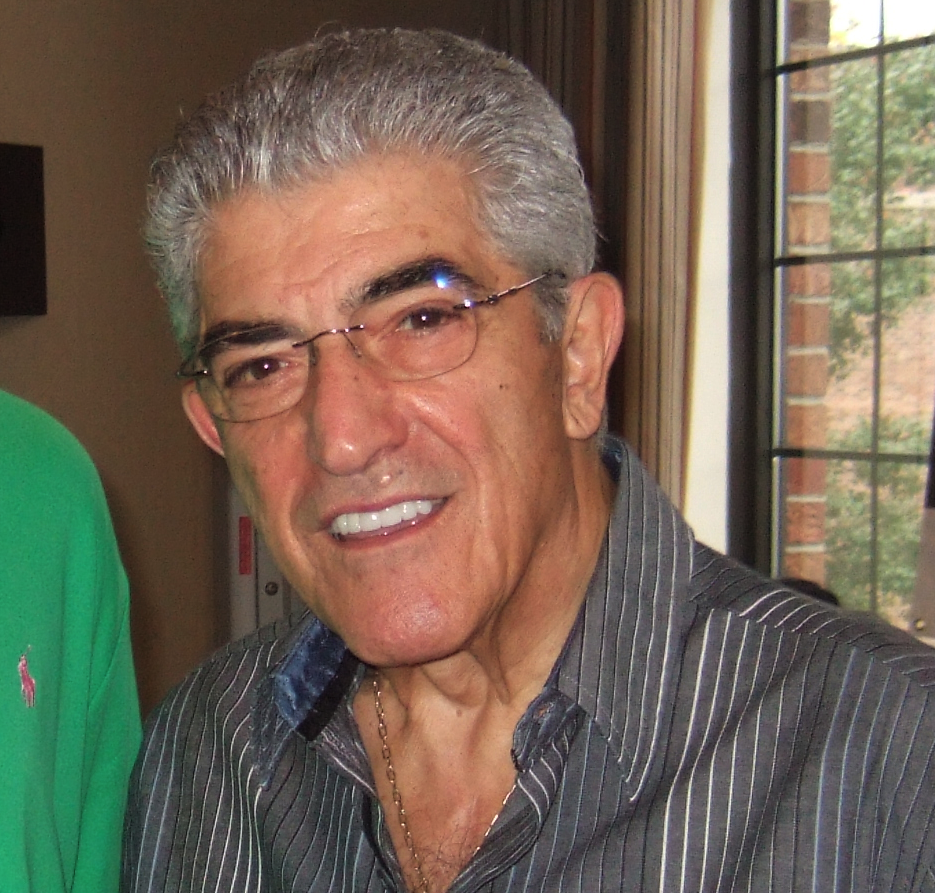
Frank Vincent

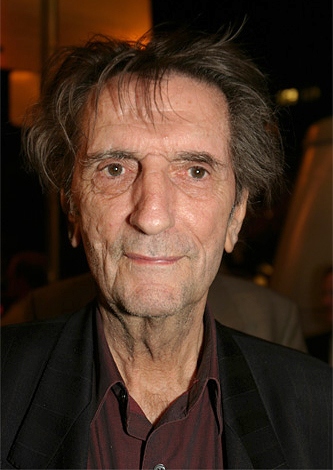
Harry Dean Stanton

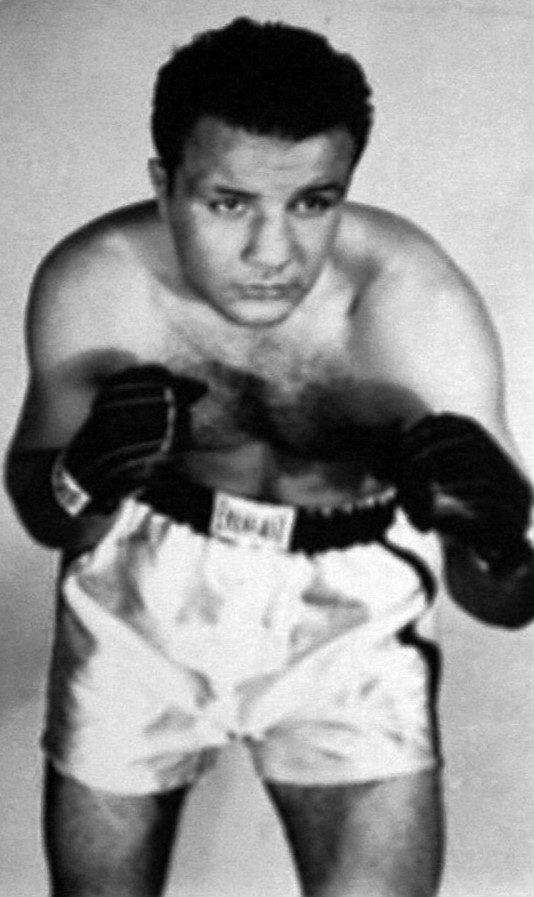
Jake LaMotta

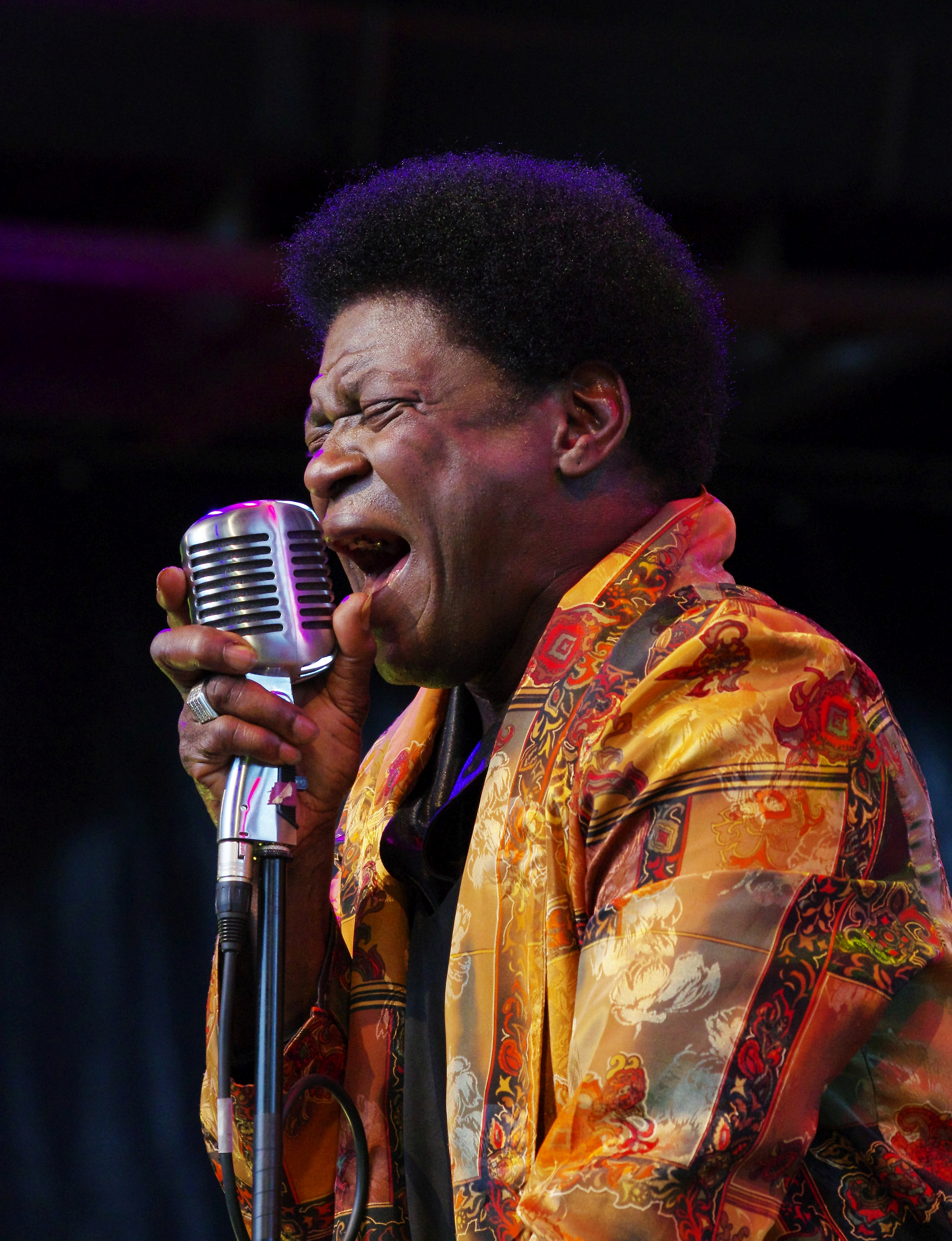
Charles Bradley

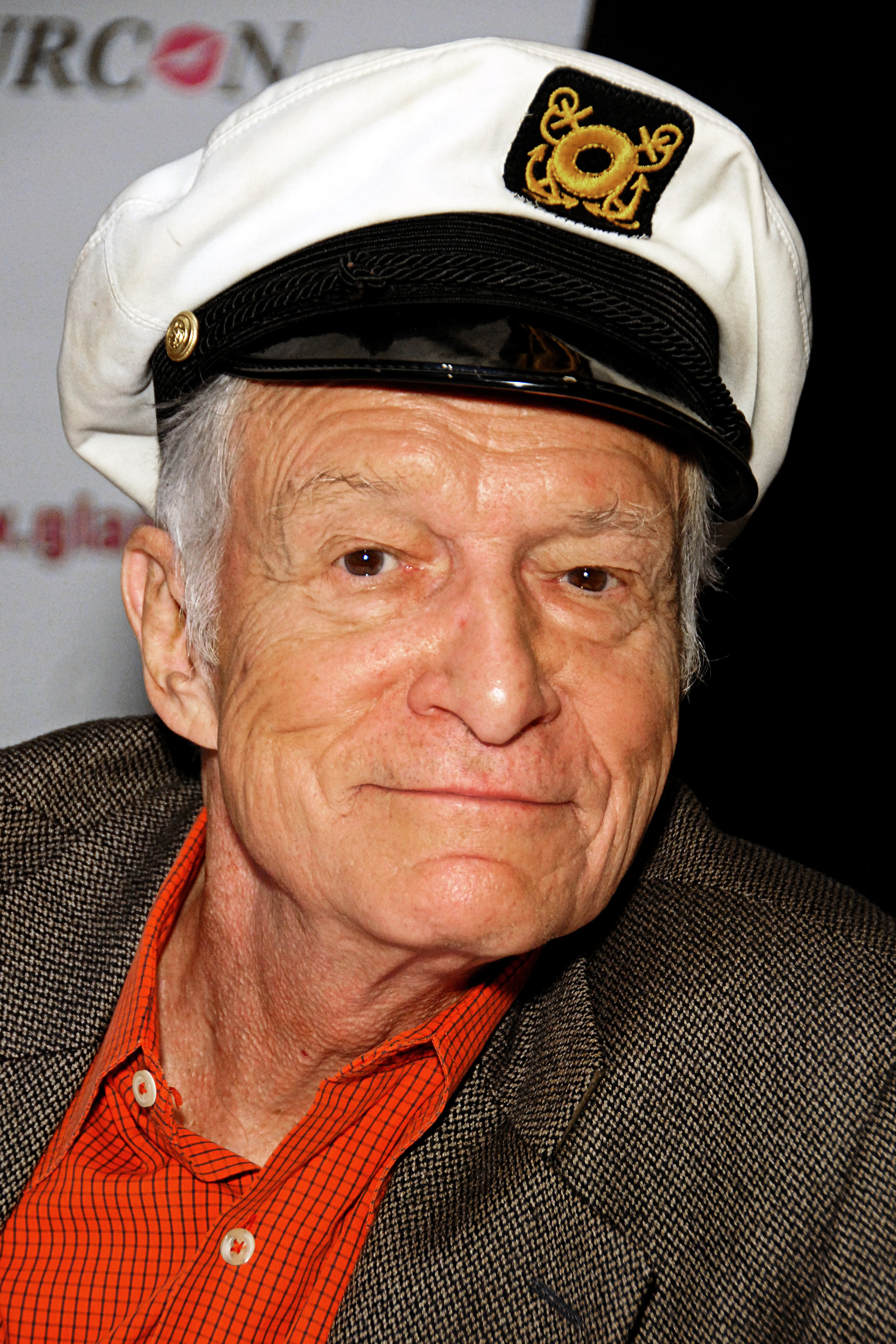
Hugh Hefner

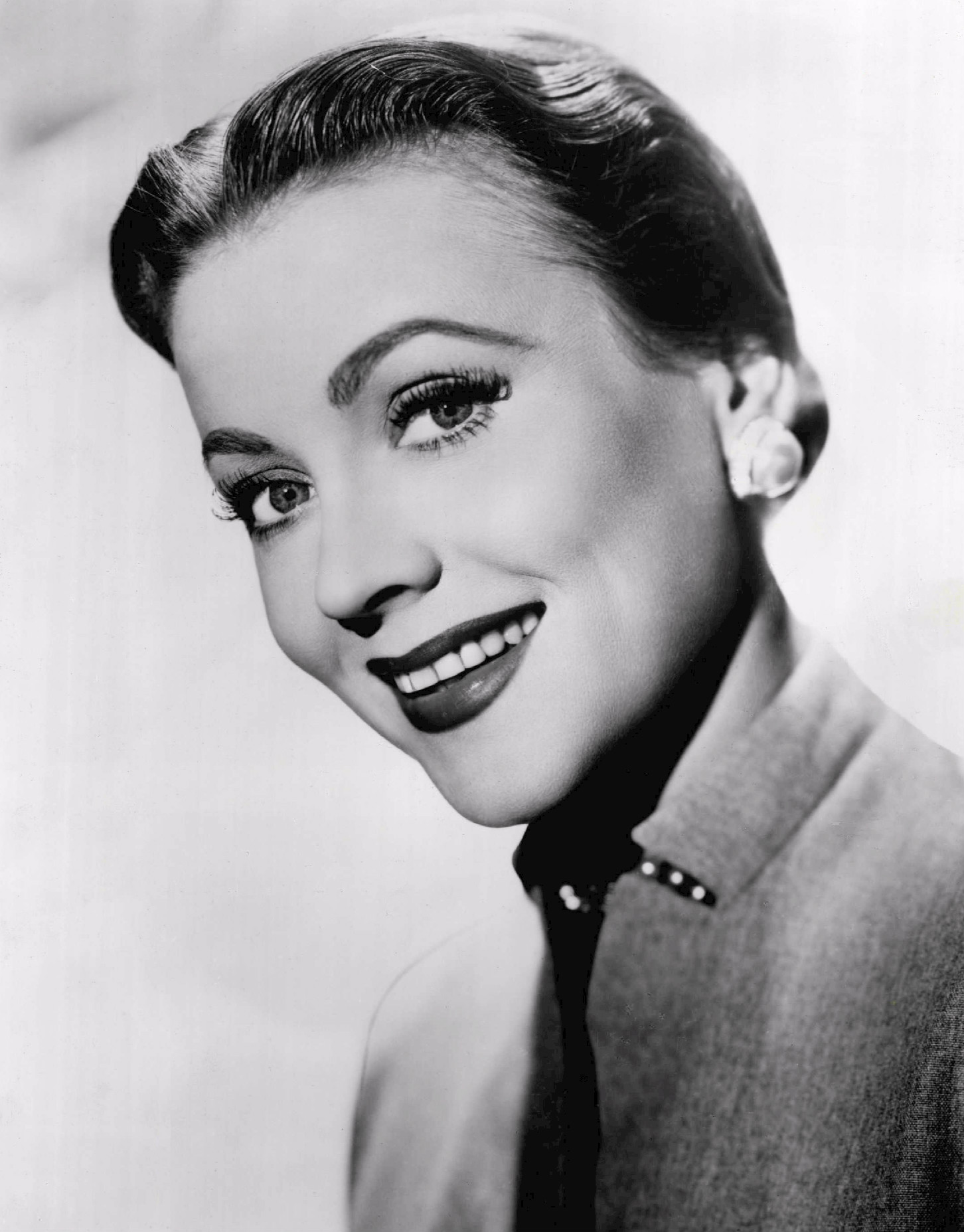
Anne Jeffreys

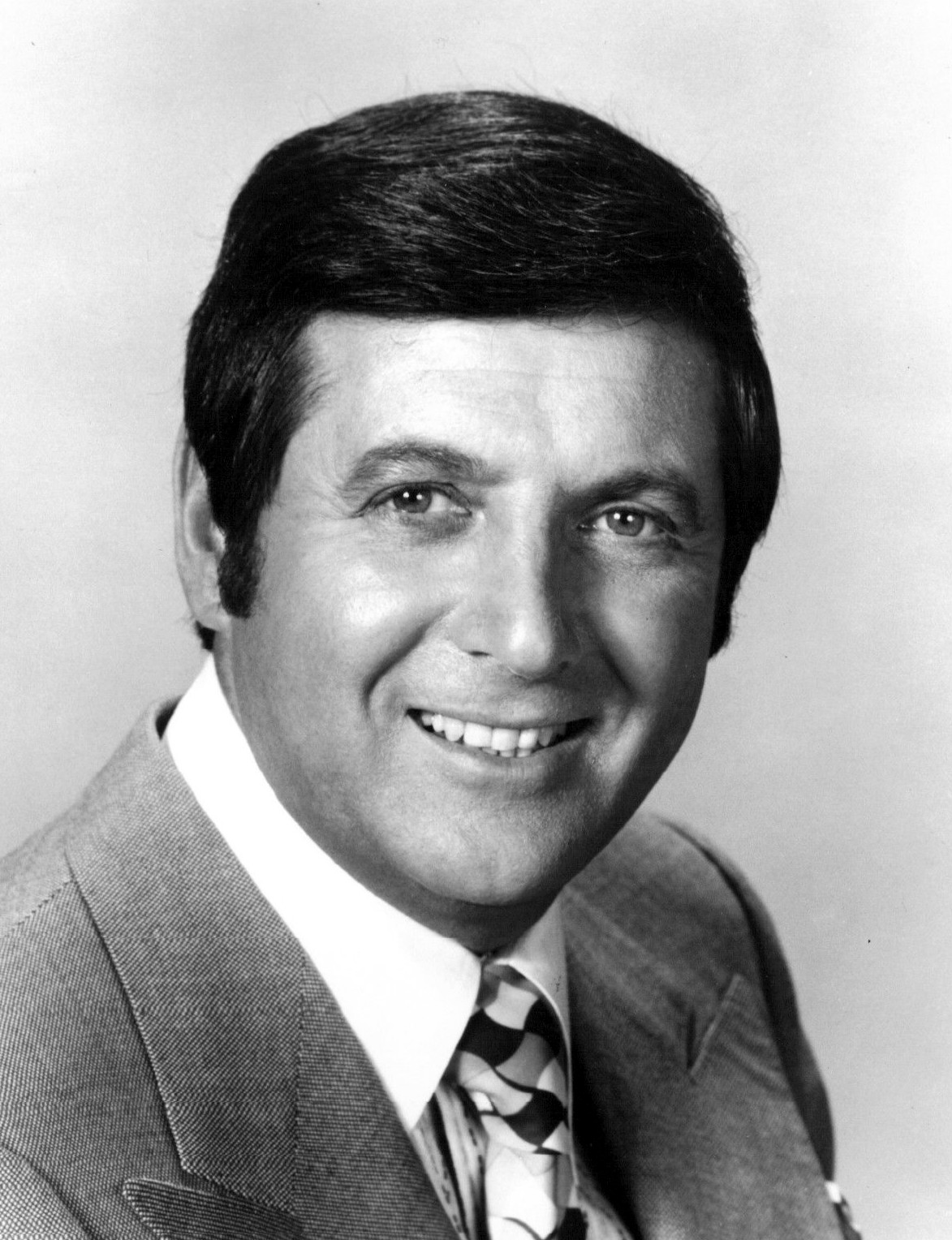
Monty Hall

- September 1
  - Shelley Berman, comedian, actor and writer (b. 1925)
  - Jackie Burkett, football player (b. 1936)
  - Bud George, politician (b. 1927)
  - Paul Moreno, politician (b. 1931)
  - Paul Schaal, baseball player (b. 1943)
- September 2
  - Halim El-Dabh, Egyptian-born composer, musician, and ethnomusicologist (b. 1921)
  - Elizabeth Kemp, actress (b. 1951)
  - Murray Lerner, documentary filmmaker (b. 1927)
  - Michael Simanowitz, politician (b. 1971)
  - Lucky Varela, politician (b. 1935)
  - Drew Wahlroos, football player (b. 1980)
- September 3
  - John Ashbery, poet (b. 1927)
  - Walter Becker, jazz-rock musician, songwriter, and record producer (b. 1950)
  - John Byrne Cooke, bluegrass musician, novelist, and photographer (b. 1940)
  - Dave Hlubek, rock guitarist and songwriter (b. 1951)
  - John P. White, government official (b. 1937)
- September 4
  - Bob Kehoe, soccer player and coach (b. 1928)
  - John Wilson Lewis, political scientist and sinologist (b. 1930)
  - Harry Meshel, politician (b. 1924)
- September 5
  - Nicolaas Bloembergen, Dutch-born physicist (b. 1920)
  - Janice Gardner, American politician (b. 1938)
  - Gina Mason, politician (b. 1960)
  - Gin D. Wong, Chinese-born architect (b. 1922)
  - Tom Wright, baseball player (b. 1923)
- September 6
  - Daniel Federman, medical educator (b. 1928)
  - Walter Guralnick, dentist and centenarian (b. 1916)
  - Jim McDaniels, basketball player (b. 1948)
  - Kate Millett, feminist writer, activist, and artist (b. 1934)
  - Lotfi A. Zadeh, Azerbaijani-born mathematician (b. 1921)
- September 7
  - Jeremiah Goodman, painter and illustrator (b. 1922)
  - Mark P. Mahon, politician (b. 1930)
  - Gene Michael, baseball player, manager, and executive (b. 1938)
  - Charles Owens, football player and golfer (b. 1932)
- September 8
  - Isabelle Daniels, sprinter and Olympic bronze medalist (b. 1937)
  - A. Joseph DeNucci, boxer and politician (b. 1939)
  - Blake Heron, actor (b. 1982)
  - Troy Gentry, singer (b. 1967)
  - Daniel McNeill, politician (b. 1947)
  - Jerry Pournelle, science fiction writer and journalist (b. 1933)
  - Don Williams, country singer, musician, and songwriter (b. 1939)
- September 9
  - Jim Donohue, baseball player (b. 1937)
  - Michael Friedman, composer and lyricist (b. 1975)
  - Oscar E. Huber, politician (b. 1917)
- September 10
  - Xavier Atencio, animator and Disney imagineer (b. 1919)
  - Nancy Dupree, historian (b. 1927)
  - Don Ohlmeyer, television producer and network executive (b. 1945)
  - Len Wein, comics writer and editor (b. 1948)
- September 11
  - Mel Didier, baseball scout (b. 1927)
  - Mark LaMura, actor (b. 1948)
- September 12
  - Charles F. Knight, business executive (b. 1939)
  - Gary I. Wadler, internist and sports physician (b. 1939)
  - Edith Windsor, LGBT rights activist (b. 1929)
- September 13
  - Pete Domenici, politician; U.S. Senator from New Mexico (1973–2009) (b. 1932)
  - Gary Otte, convicted murderer (b. 1971)
  - Frank Vincent, actor (b. 1937)
- September 14
  - George Englund, film producer, director, editor, and screenwriter (b. 1926)
  - Basil Gogos, illustrator (b. 1939)
  - Grant Hart, rock musician and songwriter (b. 1961)
  - Tommy Irvin, politician (b. 1929)
- September 15
  - Herbert W. Kalmbach, attorney and banker (b. 1921)
  - Myrna Lamb, playwright (b. 1930)
  - Harry Dean Stanton, actor and singer (b. 1926)
- September 16
  - Penny Chenery, racehorse owner and breeder (b. 1922)
  - Ted Christopher, racing driver (b. 1958)
  - Ben Dorcy, roadie (b. 1925)
  - Mitchell Flint, lawyer and World War II aviator (b. 1923)
  - Brenda Lewis, operatic soprano and actress (b. 1921)
  - Nabeel Qureshi, Christian apologist (b. 1983)
  - Bucky Scribner, football player (b. 1960)
- September 17
  - Bonnie Angelo, journalist (b. 1924)
  - William F. Goodling, politician; U.S. Representative from Pennsylvania (1975–2001) (b. 1927)
  - Bobby Heenan, professional wrestler, manager, and commentator (b. 1944)
  - Dave Hilton, baseball player (b. 1950)
  - Lucy Ozarin, psychiatrist (b. 1914)
- September 18
  - Ronald E. Carrier, university president (b. 1932)
  - Paul E. Gray, electrical engineer and university president (b. 1932)
  - Paul Horner, writer and humorist (b. 1978)
  - Mark Selby, rock musician, singer, songwriter, and record producer (b. 1961)
  - Pete Turner, photographer (b. 1934)
- September 19
  - Bernie Casey, football player and actor (b. 1939)
  - Jake LaMotta, boxer and comedian (b. 1922)
  - Johnny Sandlin, record producer and engineer (b. 1945)
- September 20
  - William J. Ely, U.S. Army general (b. 1911)
  - Mickey Harrington, baseball player (b. 1934)
  - Garry Hill, baseball pitcher (b. 1946)
  - Ed Phillips, baseball pitcher (b. 1944)
  - Lillian Ross, journalist and author (b. 1918)
- September 21 – Larry J. McKinney, federal judge (b. 1944)
- September 22
  - Rick Shaw, radio and television personality (b. 1938)
  - Daniel Yankelovich, social scientist (b. 1924)
- September 23
  - Charles Bradley, funk and soul singer (b. 1948)
  - Dorothy Eck, politician (b. 1924)
  - Seth Firkins, audio engineer (b. 1981)
  - Elizabeth D. Phillips, university administrator (b. 1945)
  - Samuel H. Young, politician; U.S. Representative from Illinois (1973–1975) (b. 1922)
- September 24
  - Barbara Blaine, anti-pedophile activist (b. 1956)
  - Norman Dyhrenfurth, Swiss-born mountain climber (b. 1918)
  - Albert Innaurato, playwright (b. 1947)
  - Tony Lewis, politician; state legislator from West Virginia
  - Orville Lynn Majors, nurse and serial killer (b. 1961)
  - Joseph M. McDade, politician; U.S. Representative from Pennsylvania (1963–1999) (b. 1931)
  - Robert J. McFarlin, politician (b. 1929)
  - Kit Reed, author (b. 1932)
- September 25
  - Joe Bailon, vehicle customizer (b. 1923)
  - Nora Marks Dauenhauer, Tlingit author, poet, and scholar (b. 1927)
  - Grant H. Palmer, educator and critic of Mormonism (b. 1940)
  - Clarence Purfeerst, politician (b. 1928)
  - Joe Schaffer, football player (b. 1937)
  - Joseph W. Schmitt, spacesuit technician (b. 1916)
  - Jim Walrod, interior design consultant (b. 1961)
  - Elaine Hoffman Watts, klezmer drummer (b. 1932)
- September 26
  - Donnie Corker, transvestite entertainer (b. 1951)
  - Barry Dennen, actor (b. 1938)
  - Alfred Stepan, political scientist (b. 1936)
- September 27
  - CeDell Davis, blues singer and musician (b. 1926)
  - Hugh Hefner, magazine publisher, socialite, and activist (b. 1926)
  - Anne Jeffreys, actress and singer (b. 1923)
  - Red Miller, football coach (b. 1927)
  - Stanley M. Rumbough Jr., businessman, socialite, and philanthropist (b. 1920)
- September 30
  - Monty Hall, Canadian-American game show host (b. 1921)
  - Frank Hamblen, basketball player and coach (b. 1947)
  - Donald Malarkey, U.S. Army soldier of World War II (b. 1921)
  - Tom Paley, folk musician (b. 1928)
  - Lou Reda, documentary filmmaker (b. 1925)
  - Joe Tiller, football player and coach (b. 1942)
  - Vladimir Voevodsky, Russian-American mathematician (b. 1966)

=== October ===
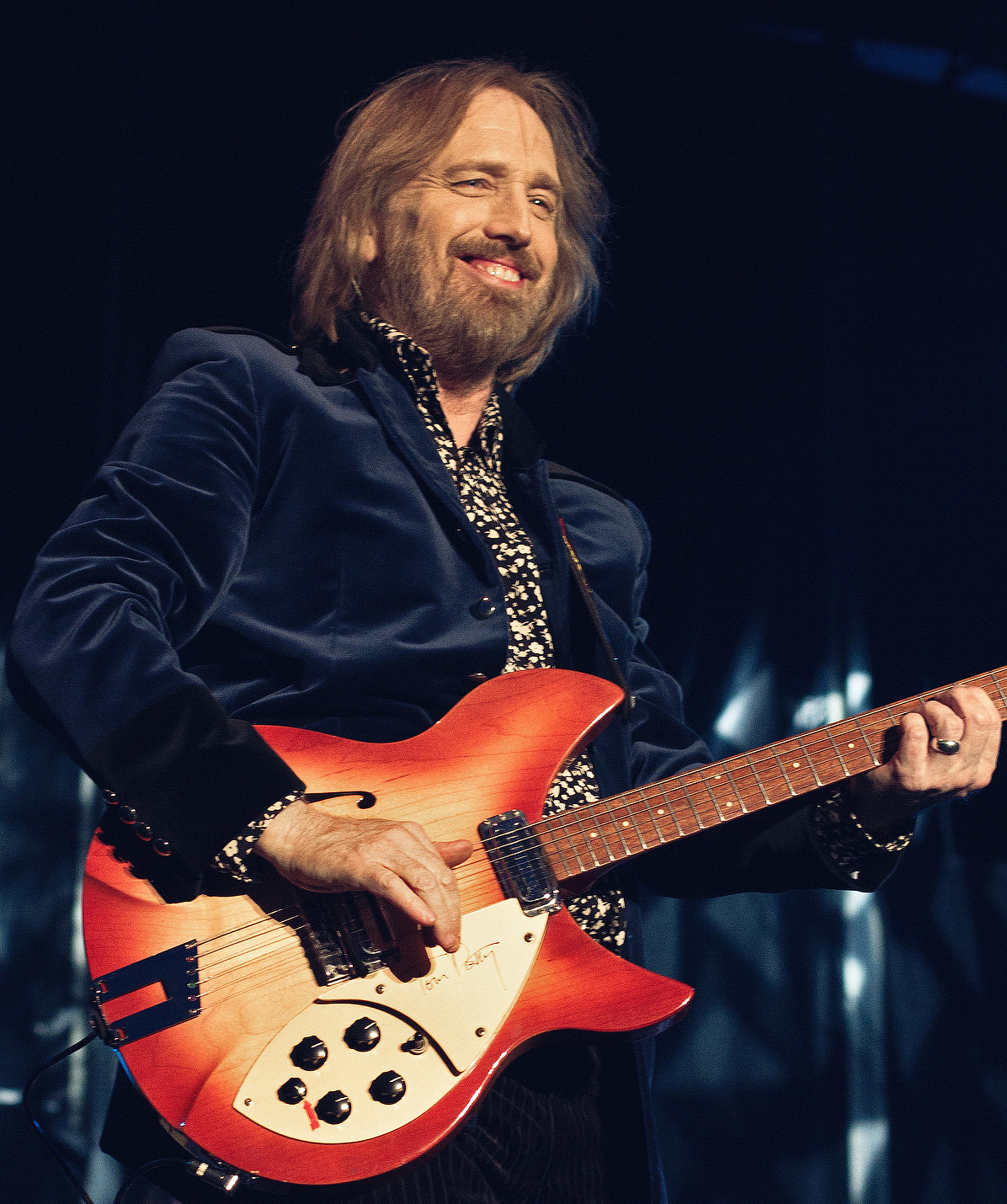
Tom Petty

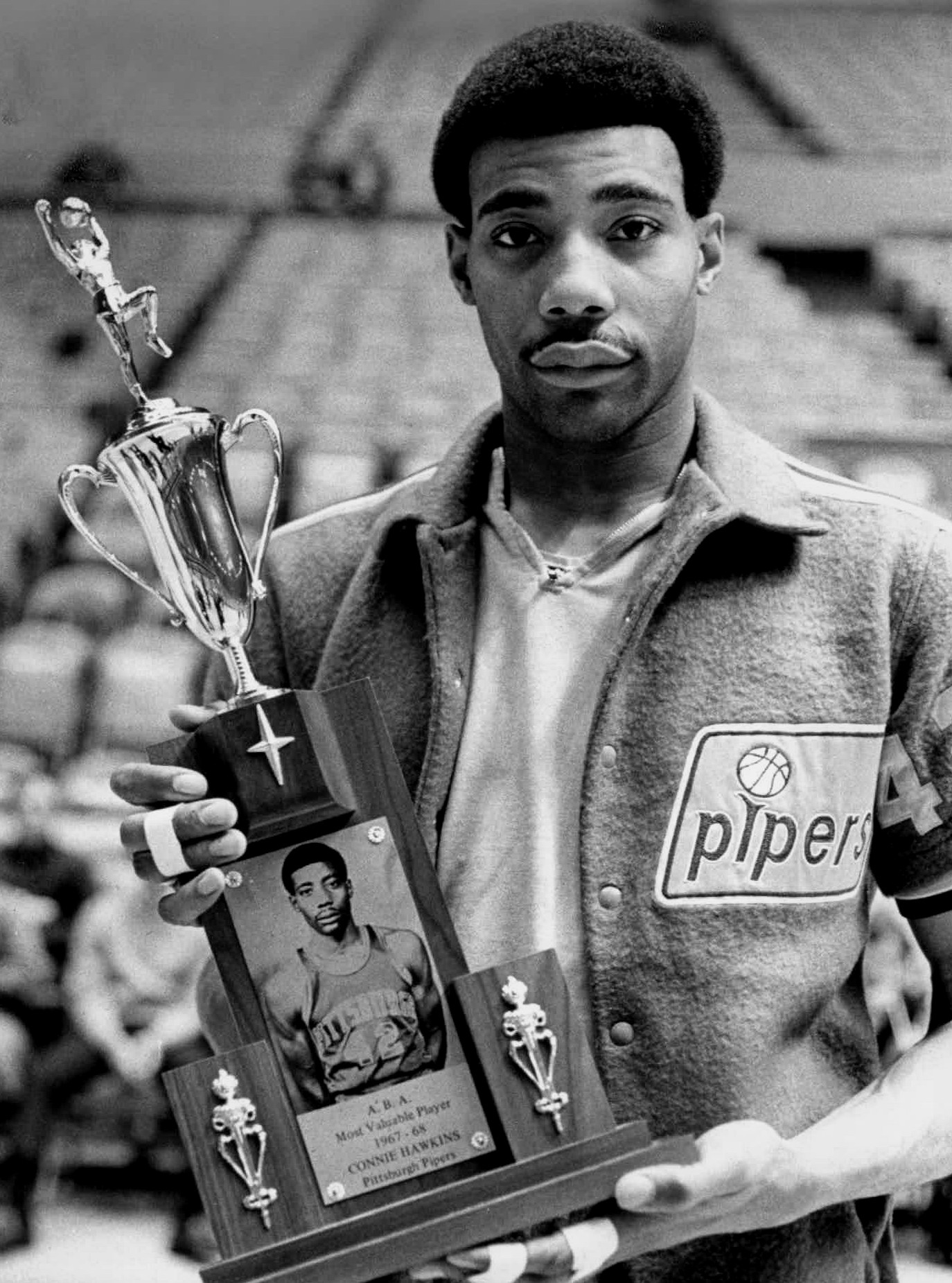
Connie Hawkins

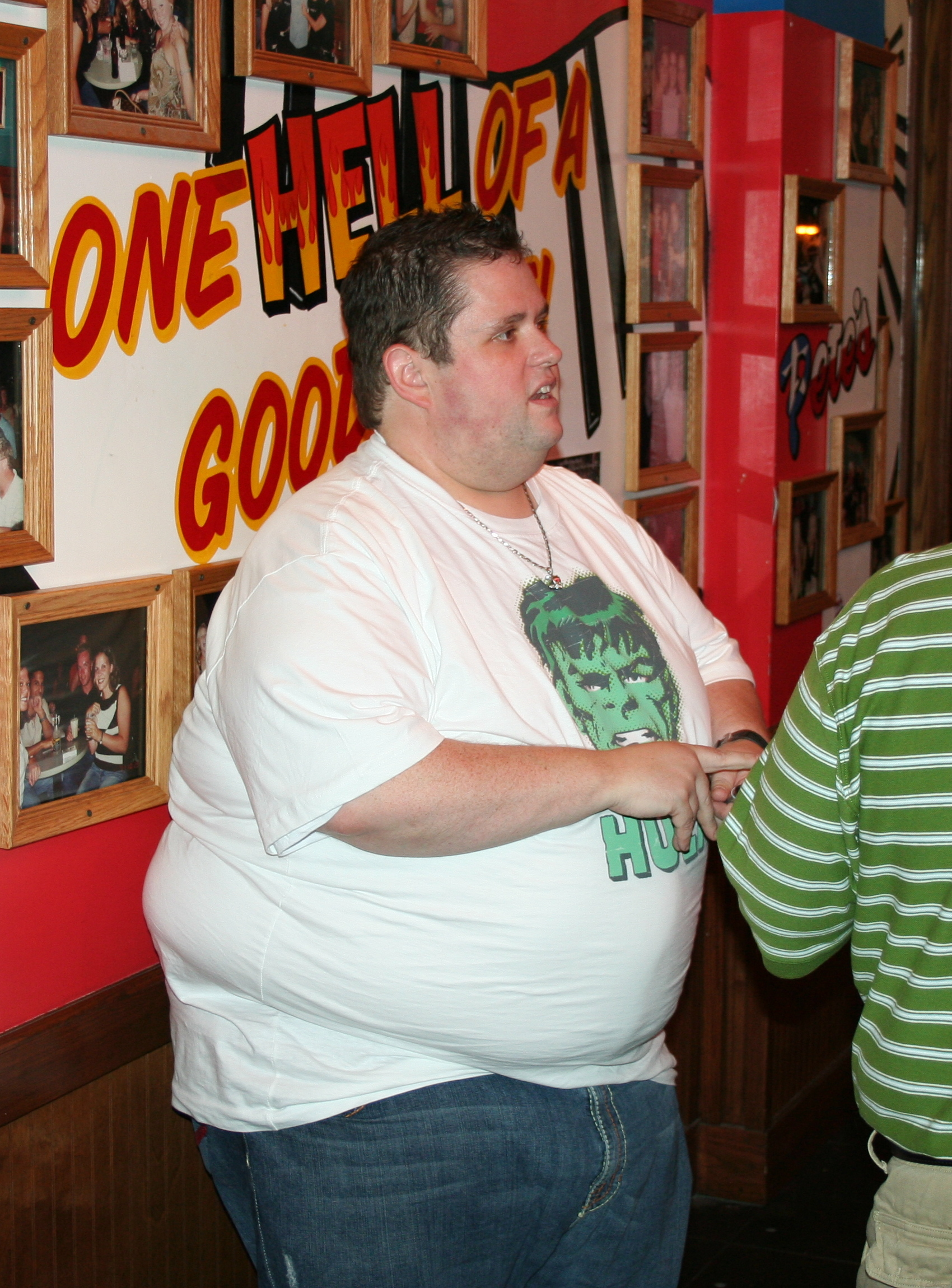
Ralphie May

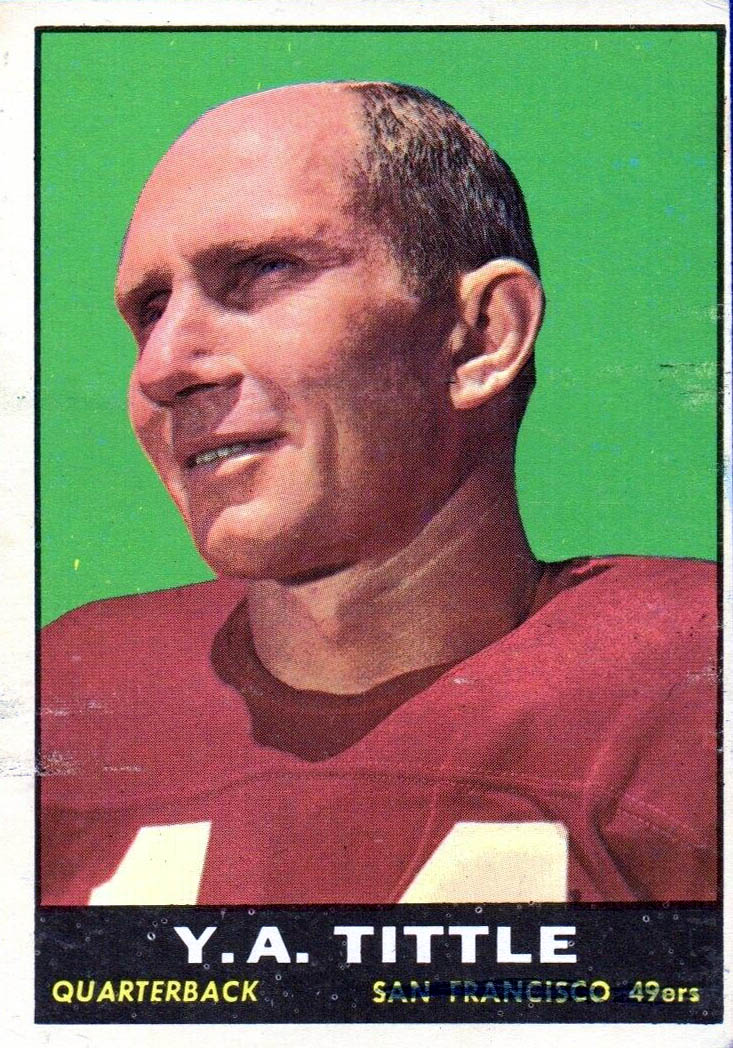
Y. A. Tittle

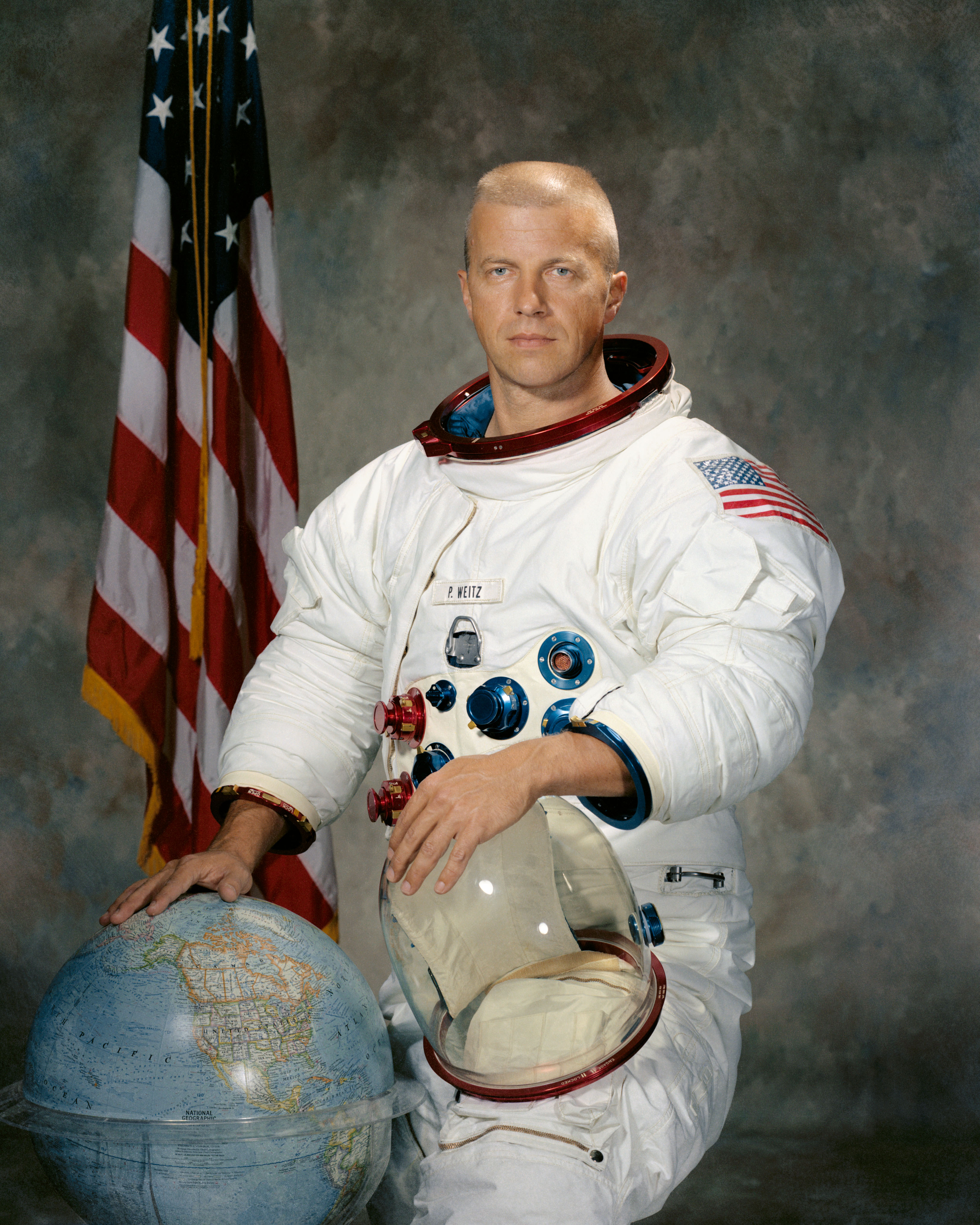
Paul J. Weitz

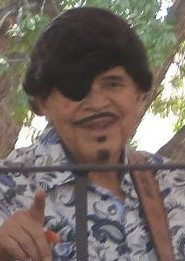
Al Hurricane

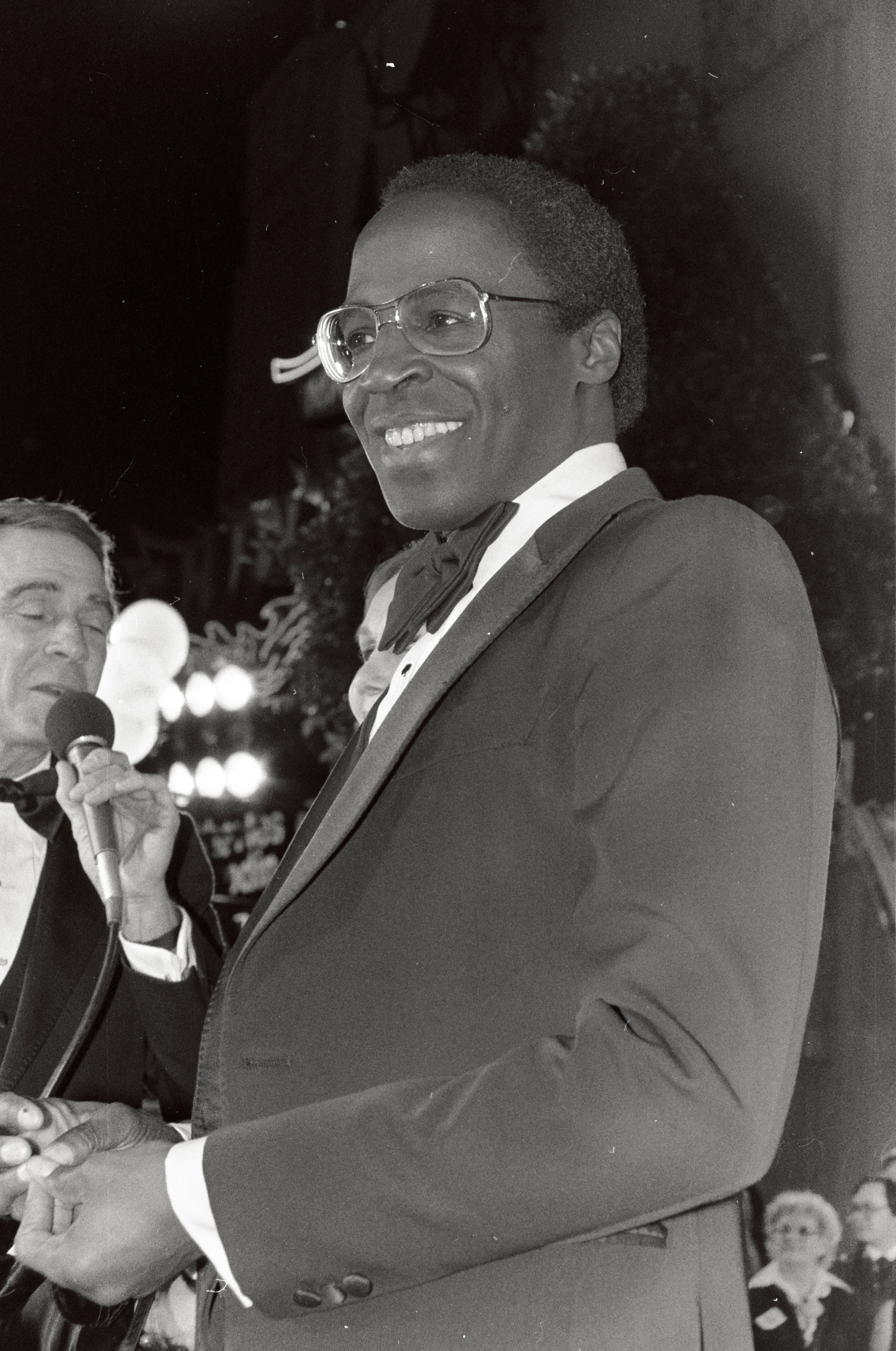
Robert Guillaume

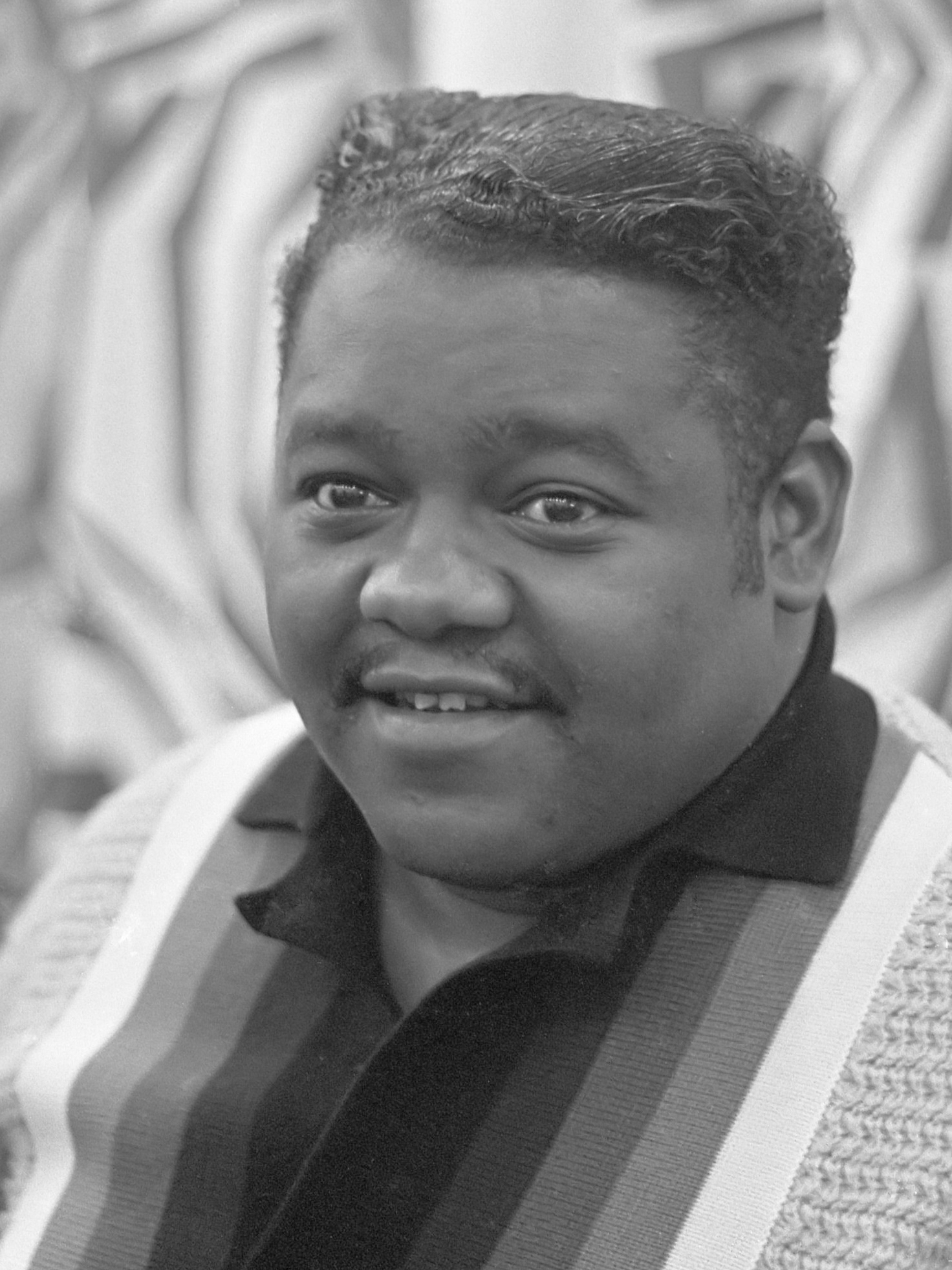
Fats Domino

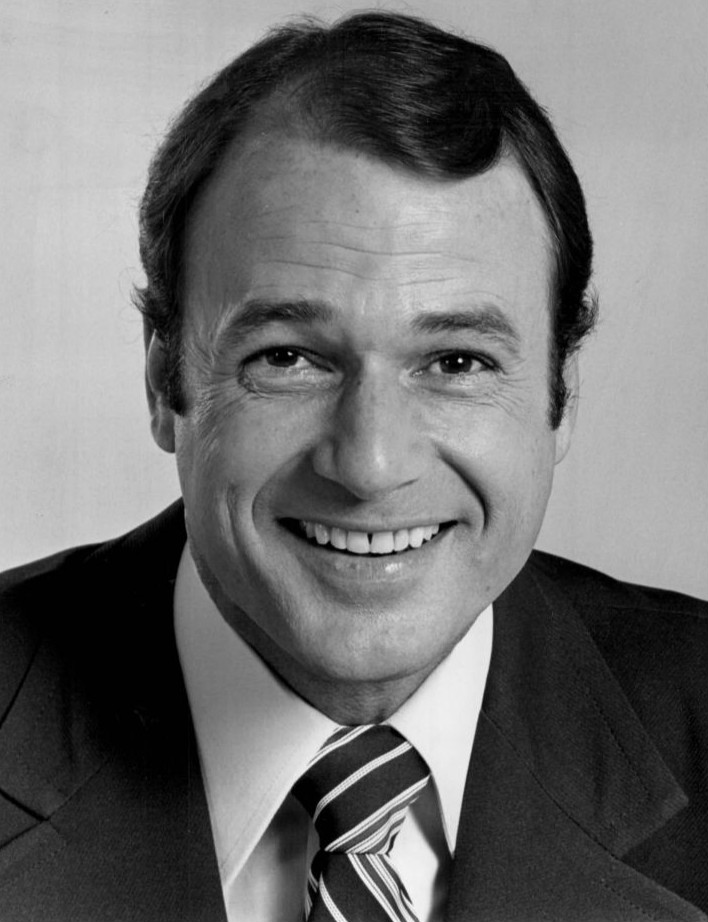
Jack Bannon

- October 1
  - Robert D. Hales, Mormon religious leader (b. 1932)
  - Arthur Janov, psychologist and psychotherapist (b. 1927)
  - Samuel Irving Newhouse Jr., publisher, billionaire, art collector, and philanthropist (b. 1927)
  - Stephen Paddock, mass murderer behind the 2017 Las Vegas Shooting (b. 1953)
  - Dave Strader, sportscaster (b. 1955)
- October 2
  - Solly Hemus, baseball player, coach, and manager (b. 1923)
  - Simon Ostrach, academic scientist and engineer (b. 1923)
  - Paul Otellini, business executive (b. 1950)
  - Jim Patterson, politician (b. 1950)
  - Tom Petty, rock musician, singer, songwriter, and record producer (b. 1950)
  - Barbara Tisserat, lithographer (b. 1951)
  - Robert Yates, NASCAR team owner (b. 1948)
- October 3
  - Bob Gannon, politician (b. 1959)
  - John Herrnstein, baseball and football player (b. 1938)
  - Ninja Jorgensen, Olympic volleyball player (b. 1940)
  - Lance Russell, professional wrestling announcer (b. 1926)
- October 4
  - Rufus Hannah, homeless rights advocate (b. 1954)
  - John Miller, politician; U.S. Representative from Washington (1985–1993) (b. 1938)
  - Jerry Ross, songwriter and record producer (b. 1933)
- October 5 – Nora Johnson, author (b. 1933)
- October 6
  - Connie Hawkins, basketball player (b. 1942)
  - Ralphie May, comedian (b. 1972)
  - Dick Roeding, politician (b. 1930)
  - Bunny Sigler, songwriter and record producer (b. 1941)
  - Judy Stone, journalist and film critic (b. 1924)
- October 7 – Jim Landis, baseball player (b. 1934)
- October 8
  - Edna Dummerth, baseball player (b. 1924)
  - Jerry Kleczka, politician; U.S. Representative from Wisconsin (1984–2005) (b. 1943)
  - Don Lock, baseball player (b. 1936)
  - Grady Tate, jazz drummer and vocalist (b. 1932)
  - Y. A. Tittle, football player (b. 1926)
- October 9
  - ElizaBeth Gilligan, fantasy writer (b. 1962)
  - Dale Hagerman, pharmacist and businessman (b. 1927)
  - Roy Hawes, baseball player (b. 1926)
  - Ben Hawkins, football player (b. 1944)
  - Vincent La Selva, conductor (b. 1929)
  - Bill Puterbaugh, racing driver (b. 1936)
- October 10
  - David Chapman, handball player (b. 1975)
  - Charles E. Gibson Jr., lawyer (b. 1925)
  - Bob Schiller, television writer (b. 1918)
- October 11
  - Don Pedro Colley, actor (b. 1938)
  - James R. Ford, educator, business executive, and politician (b. 1925)
  - Paul Hufnagle, politician (b. 1936)
  - Betty Moczynski, baseball player (b. 1926)
- October 12
  - Ed Long, politician (b. 1934)
  - Robert Lynn Pruett, convicted murderer (b. 1979)
- October 13 – William Lombardy, chess grandmaster and Roman Catholic priest (b. 1937)
- October 14
  - Inside Information, Thoroughbred racehorse (b. 1991)
  - Marian Cannon Schlesinger, painter, author, and centenarian (b. 1912)
  - Daniel Webb, baseball pitcher (b. 1989)
  - Richard Wilbur, poet (b. 1921)
- October 15
  - Dave Bry, music journalist and editor (b. 1970)
  - Burrhead Jones, professional wrestler (b. 1937)
- October 16
  - John Andreason, politician (b. 1929)
- October 17
  - Ed Barnowski, baseball pitcher (b. 1943)
  - Mychael Knight, fashion designer (b. 1978)
  - Michele Marsh, television journalist (b. 1954)
  - Julian May, science fiction, fantasy, and horror writer (b. 1931)
  - Dick Morley, engineer and inventor (b. 1932)
- October 18
  - Brent Briscoe, actor and screenwriter (b. 1961)
  - Helen DeVos, philanthropist (b. 1927)
- October 20
  - Stan Kowalski, professional wrestler (b. 1926)
  - Justin Reed, basketball player (b. 1982)
- October 22
  - Al Hurricane, singer-songwriter and guitarist (b. 1936)
  - Scott Putesky, heavy metal guitarist (b. 1968)
  - Chuck Weber, football player (b. 1930)
- October 23
  - Michael Patrick Driscoll, Roman Catholic prelate (b. 1939)
  - Paul J. Weitz, aviator and astronaut (b. 1932)
- October 24
  - Robert Guillaume, actor (b. 1927)
  - Fats Domino, pianist and singer-songwriter (b. 1928)
- October 25 – Jack Bannon, American actor (b. (1940)
- October 26
  - Shea Norman, gospel singer (b. 1971)
  - Stephen Toulouse, policy specialist and public relations manager (b. 1972)
- October 27 – Joe Taub, businessman, philanthropist and sports owner (b. (1929)
- October 28 – Ronald Getoor, mathematician (b. 1929)
- October 29
  - Muhal Richard Abrams, jazz pianist (b. 1930)
  - Dennis Banks, activist and actor (b. 1937)
  - Richard E. Cavazos, army general (b. 1929)
- October 30 – Judy Martz, politician, 22nd Governor of Montana (b. 1943)
- October 31 – Red Murrell, basketball player (b. 1933)

=== November ===
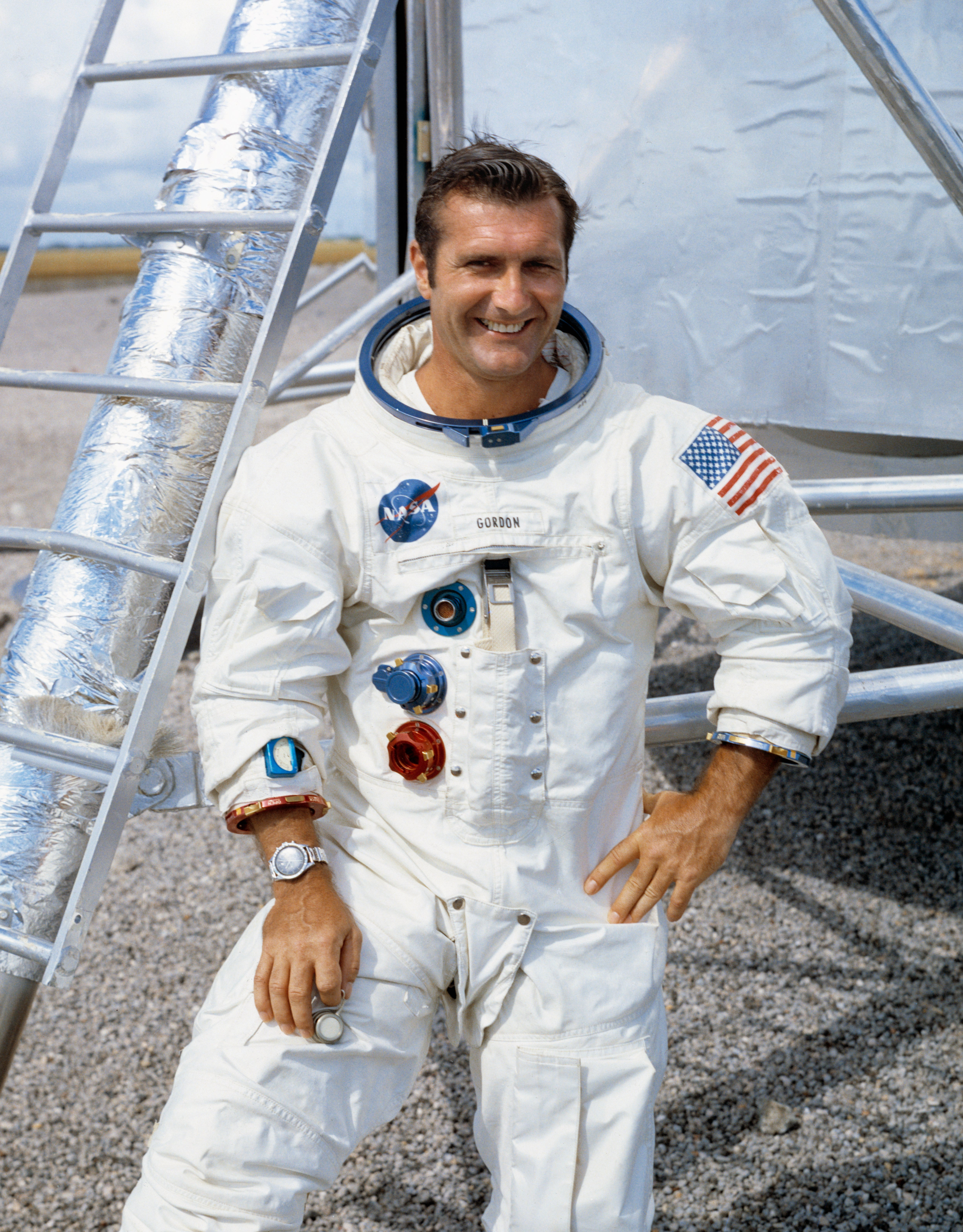
Richard F. Gordon Jr.

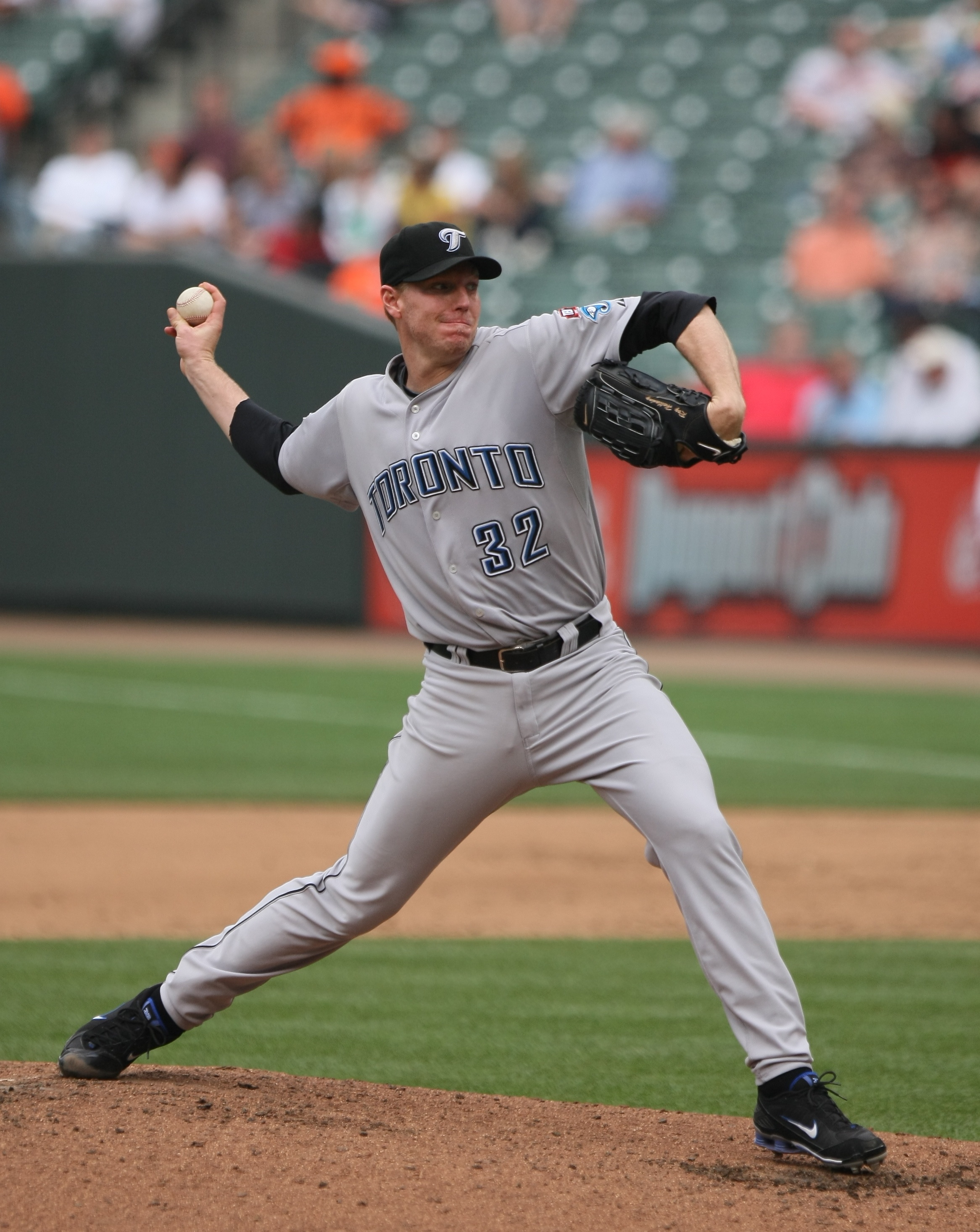
Roy Halladay

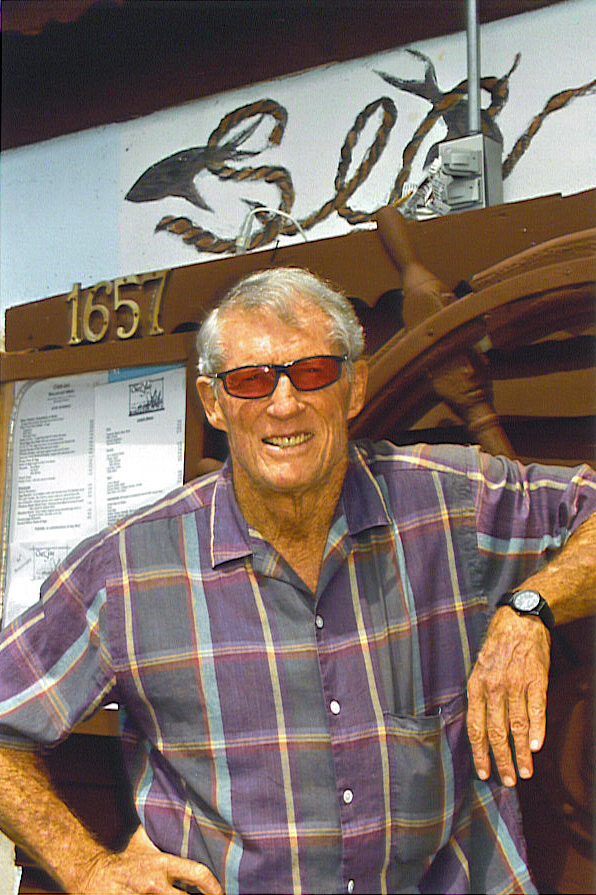
Brad Harris

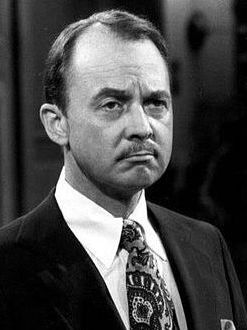
John Hillerman

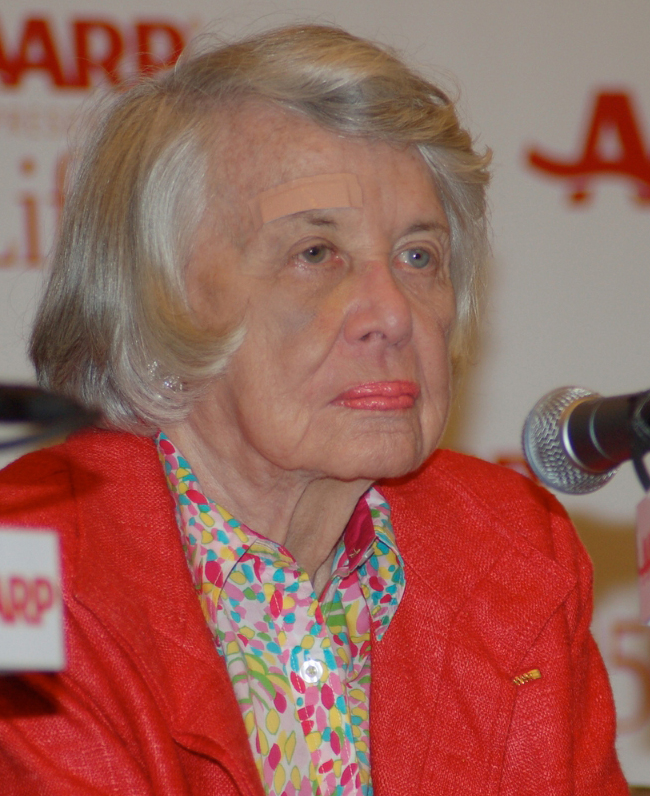
Liz Smith

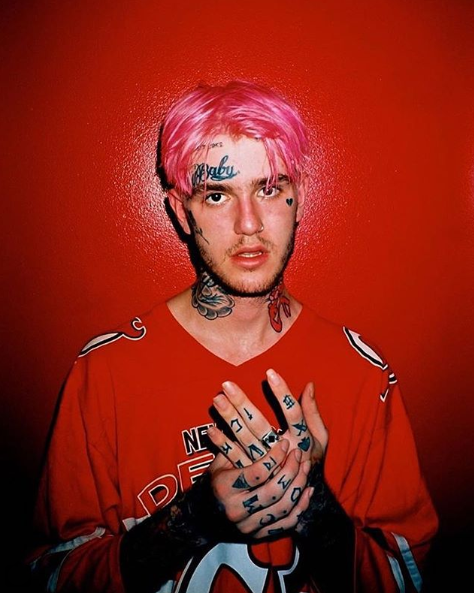
Lil Peep

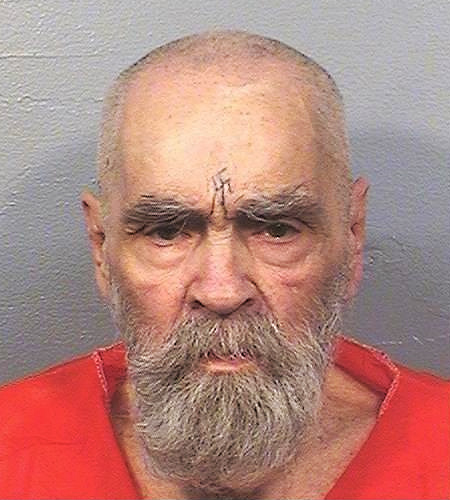
Charles Manson

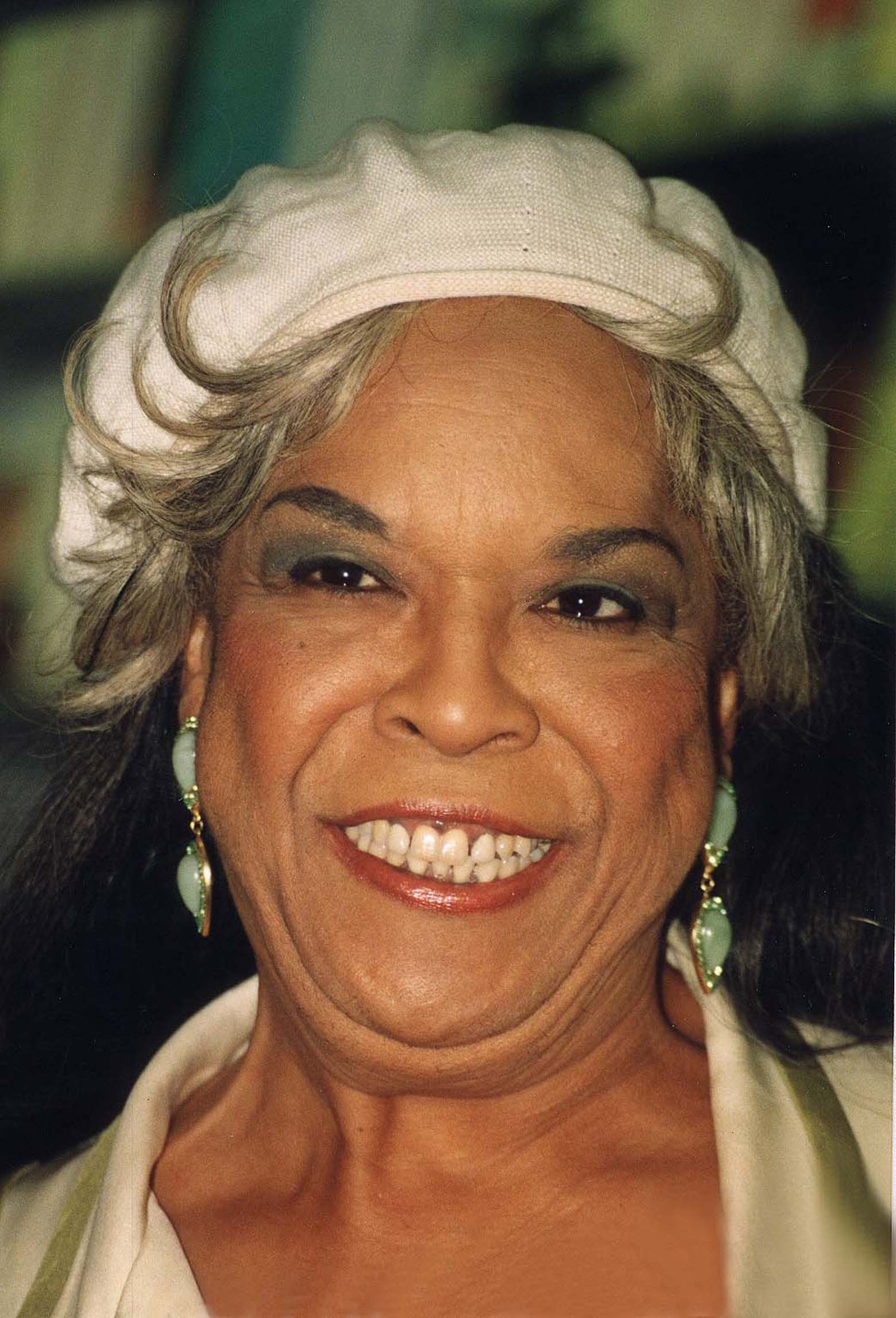
Della Reese

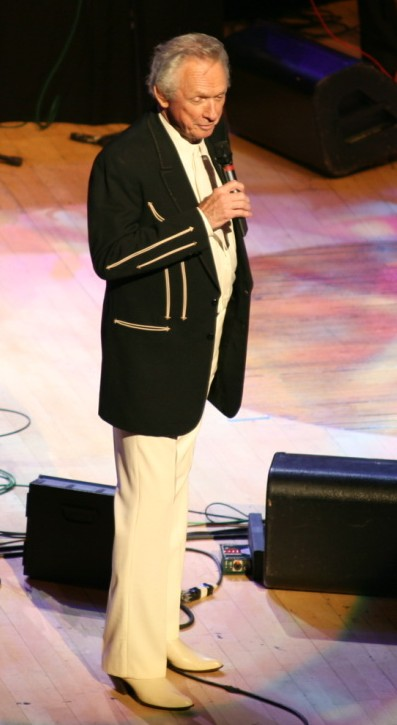
Mel Tillis

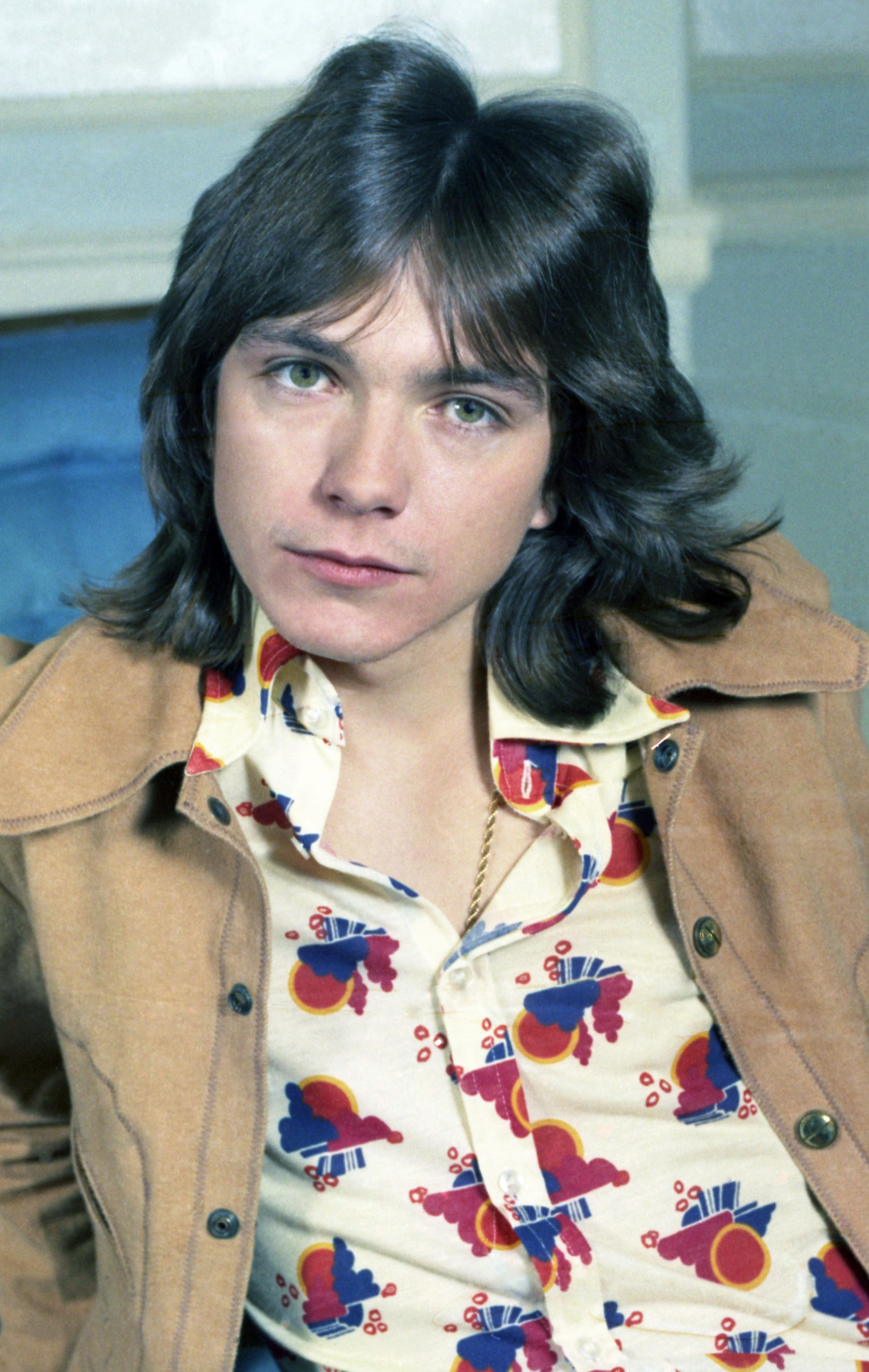
David Cassidy

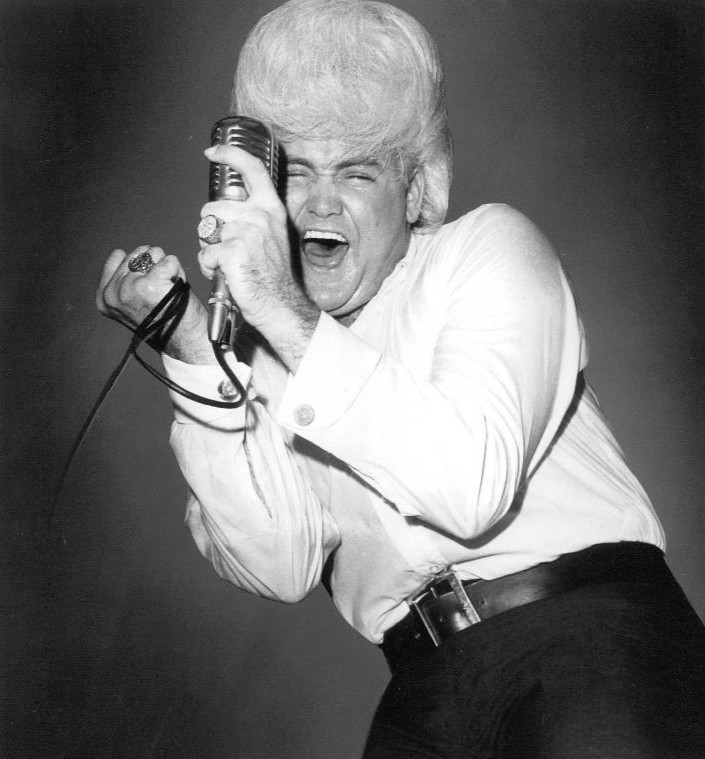
Wayne Cochran

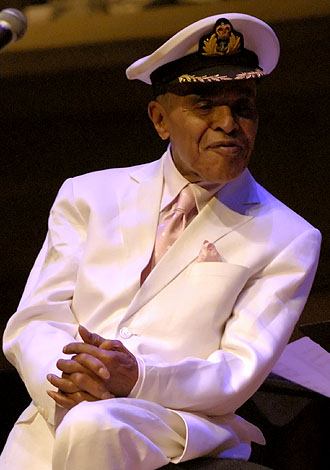
Jon Hendricks

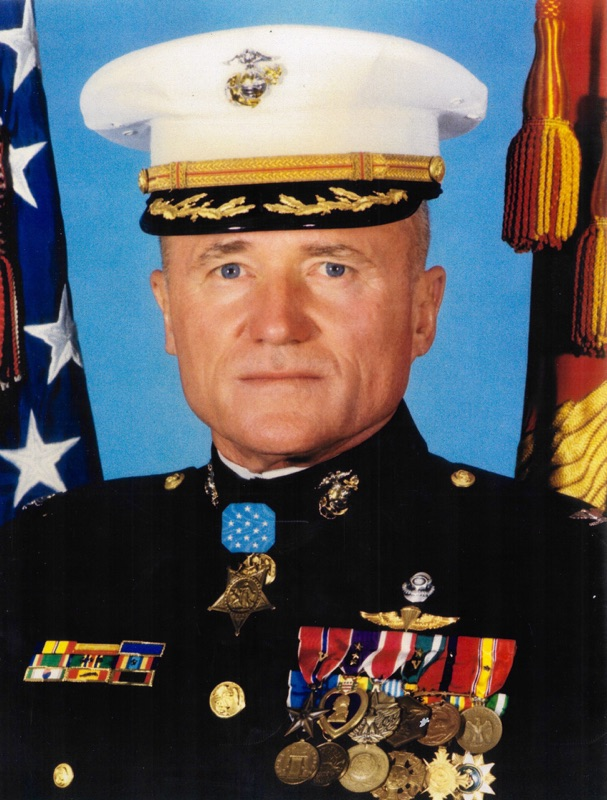
Wesley L. Fox

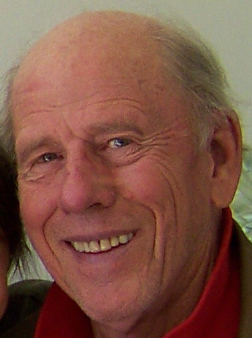
Rance Howard

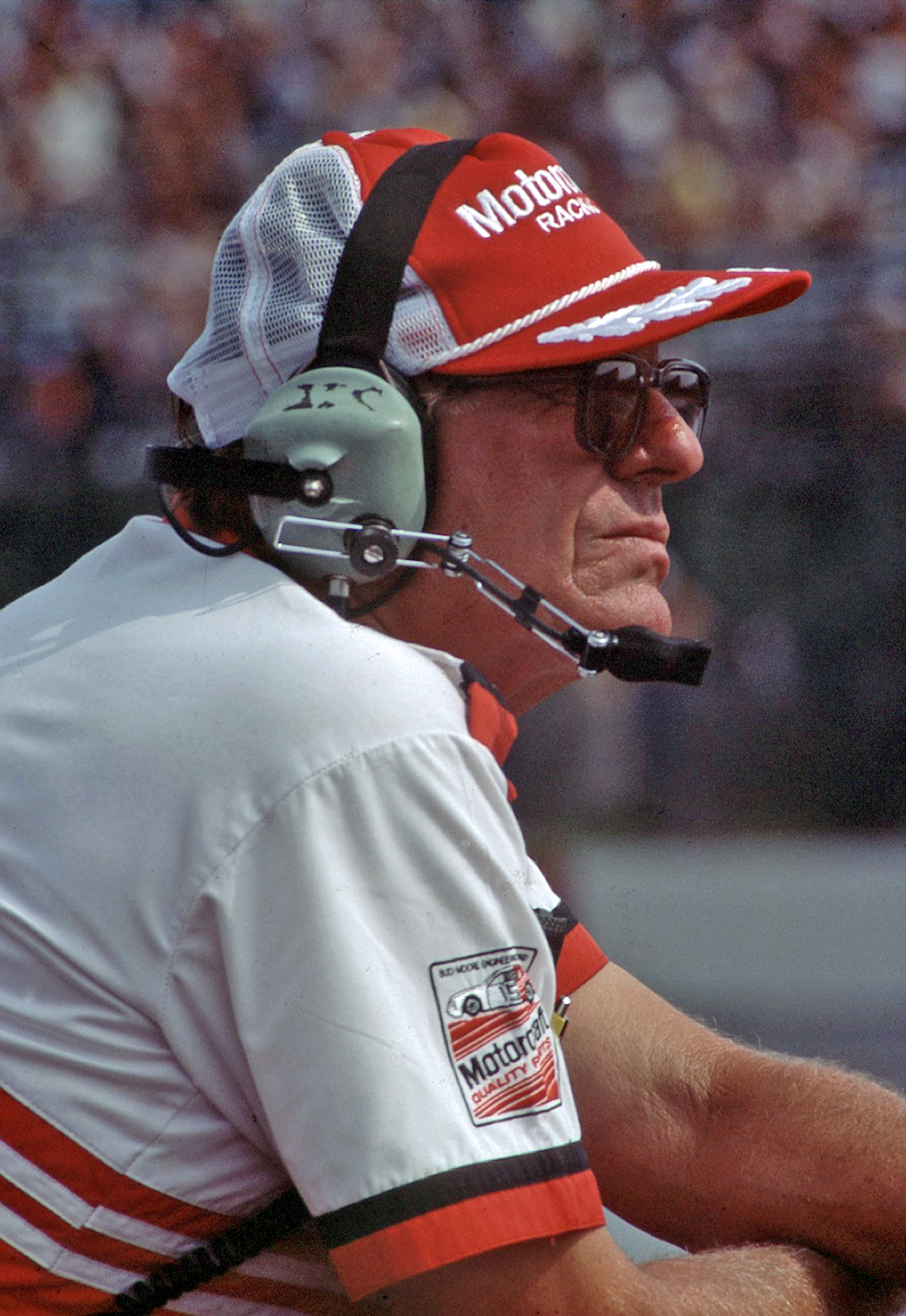
Bud Moore

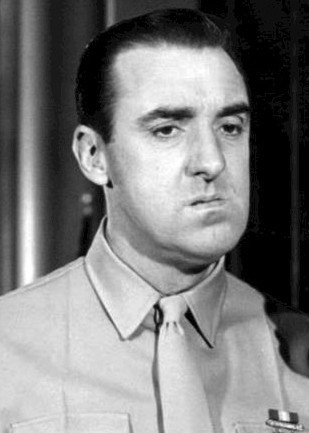
Jim Nabors

- November 1
  - Brad Bufanda, actor (b. 1983)
  - Katie Lee, folk singer, writer, photographer, and environmental activist (b. 1919)
  - John Mecray, realist painter (b. 1937)
  - Richard P. Mills, educator (b. 1944)
  - Paul V. Mullaney, politician and judge (b. 1919)
  - Myron Noodleman, clown (b. 1958)
  - James Tayoun, politician (b. 1930)
- November 2
  - John Paul De Cecco, LGBT writer and academic (b. 1925)
  - Orval H. Hansen, politician; U.S. Representative from Idaho (1969–1975) (b. 1926)
  - William Landau, neurologist (b. 1924)
  - Joan Tisch, billionaire heiress, socialite, and philanthropist (b. 1927)
  - Bill Wilkerson, radio personality and sportscaster (b. 1945)
- November 3
  - Sid Catlett, basketball player (b. 1948)
  - Ed Flanagan, politician (b. 1950)
- November 4
  - C. W. Smith, racing driver and police officer (b. 1947)
  - Anna Diggs Taylor, federal judge (b. 1932)
  - Gene Verble, baseball player and manager (b. 1928)
- November 5
  - Don Eddy, basketball coach (b. 1935)
  - Nancy Friday, author (b. 1933)
  - Robert Knight, R&B singer (b. 1945)
  - Louis Roney, operatic tenor (b. 1921)
  - Vera Shlakman, economist and academic (b. 1909)
  - George Edward Tait, poet and activist (b. 1943)
- November 6
  - Dave Cloutier, football player (b. 1938)
  - Joe Fortunato, football player (b. 1930)
  - Richard F. Gordon Jr., aviator, chemist, and astronaut (b. 1929)
  - Rhona Silver, businesswoman (b. 1951)
  - Rick Stelmaszek, baseball player and coach (b. 1948)
- November 7
  - Debra Chasnoff, documentary filmmaker (b. 1957)
  - Robert De Cormier, music conductor and arranger (b. 1922)
  - Wendell Eugene, jazz trombonist (b. 1923)
  - Roy Halladay, baseball player (b. 1977)
  - Brad Harris, actor and stunt performer (b. 1933)
  - Loren Hightower, dancer and choreographer (b. 1927)
  - Dolores Kendrick, poet (b. 1927)
- November 8
  - John H. Cushman, U.S. Army general (b. 1921)
  - Wood Moy, actor (b. 1918)
  - Don Prince, baseball player (b. 1938)
- November 9
  - Donald S. Coffey, physician and educator (b. 1932)
  - Fred Cole, rock singer, songwriter, and guitarist (b. 1948)
  - Robert Gensburg, lawyer (b. 1939)
  - John Hillerman, actor (b. 1932)
  - Gene Kotlarek, Olympic ski jumper (b. 1940)
  - Chuck Mosley, rock singer, songwriter, and guitarist (b. 1959)
  - Chuck Nergard, politician (b. 1929)
  - Jim Sladky, ice dancer (b. 1947)
- November 11
  - Vanu Bose, electrical engineer and technology executive (b. 1965)
  - Frank Corsaro, theatre and opera director and actor (b. 1924)
  - Gemze de Lappe, ballerina and choreographer (b. 1922)
  - Edward S. Herman, journalist and activist (b. 1925)
  - Nate Hobgood-Chittick, football player (b. 1974)
  - Rance Pless, baseball player (b. 1925)
  - Jeffrey T. Richelson, author and researcher (b. 1949)
- November 12
  - Bobby Baker, political adviser (b. 1928)
  - Tom Cornsweet, psychologist and inventor (b. 1929)
  - Wendy Pepper, fashion designer (b. 1964)
  - John C. Raines, educator and activist (b. 1933)
  - Eric Salzman, composer, music critic, and record producer (b. 1933)
  - Edith Savage-Jennings, civil rights activist (b. 1924)
  - Liz Smith, journalist and gossip columnist (b. 1923)
  - Lawrence R. Yetka, judge (b. 1924)
- November 13
  - Jeff Capel II, basketball coach (b. 1953)
  - Bobby Doerr, baseball player and coach (b. 1918)
  - Thomas J. Hudner Jr., naval aviator (b. 1924)
  - Janet Paula Lupo, model (b. 1950)
  - Haskell Monroe, educator and university administrator (b. 1931)
  - Jim Rivera, baseball player (b. 1921)
- November 14
  - Albert C. Ledner, architect (b. 1924)
  - Nancy Zieman, sewing instructor, writer, and television host (b. 1953)
- November 15
  - Michelle Boisseau, poet (b. 1955)
  - David S. Cunningham Jr., business executive and politician (b. 1935)
  - Robert G. Jahn, physicist and parapsychologist (b. 1930)
  - Lil Peep, rapper and singer (b. 1996)
  - J. Steve Mostyn, lawyer (b. 1971)
  - Eric P. Newman, numismatist and centenarian (b. 1911)
  - Jaroslav Vanek, Czech-born economist (b. 1930)
- November 16
  - John Gambino, Italian-born mobster (b. 1940)
  - William Mayer, composer (b. 1925)
  - Ferdie Pacheco, physician, boxing trainer and commentator (b. 1927)
  - Kenneth Ryskamp, federal judge (b. 1932)
  - Jack Stauffacher, typographer and publisher (b. 1920)
  - Greg Standridge, businessman and politician (b. 1967)
  - Ann Wedgeworth, actress (b. 1934)
- November 17
  - J. C. Caroline, football player (b. 1933)
  - Aijalon Gomes, educator, missionary, and North Korean detainee (b. 1979)
  - Lilli Hornig, Czech-born scientist and feminist (b. 1921)
  - Earle Hyman, actor (b. 1926)
  - Ulrich Petersen, Peruvian-born geologist (b. 1927)
  - Robert D. Raiford, radio broadcaster and actor (b. 1927)
  - Howard Bruner Schaffer, educator and diplomat (b. 1929)
- November 18
  - Bob Borkowski, baseball player (b. 1926)
  - Flawless Sabrina, drag queen and LGBT activist (b. 1939)
  - William Hoeveler, federal judge (b. 1922)
  - Ben Riley, jazz drummer (b. 1933)
  - Ken Shapiro, child actor, television writer, and producer (b. 1942)
- November 19
  - Peter Baldwin, actor, film and television director (b. 1931)
  - Charles Manson, criminal and cult leader (b. 1934)
  - Warren "Pete" Moore, R&B singer, songwriter, and record producer (b. 1938)
  - Pancho Segura, tennis player (b. 1921)
  - Della Reese, jazz and gospel singer, actress, and ordained minister (b. 1931)
  - Mel Tillis, country music singer and songwriter (b. 1932)
- November 20
  - Eugene Domack, geologist (b. 1956)
  - Terry Glenn, football player (b. 1974)
  - Ernestine Petras, baseball player (b. 1924)
- November 21
  - David Cassidy, actor and pop singer (b. 1950)
  - Wayne Cochran, soul singer, songwriter, and record producer (b. 1939)
  - Keith Muxlow, politician (b. 1933)
  - Joseph White, psychologist (b. 1932)
- November 22
  - George Avakian, record producer (b. 1919)
  - Norman Baker, explorer (b. 1928)
  - John Coates Jr., jazz pianist, composer, and arranger (b. 1938)
  - Jon Hendricks, jazz singer and songwriter (b. 1921)
  - Maurice Hinchey, politician (b. 1938)
  - Tommy Keene, rock singer and songwriter (b. 1958)
  - Charles C. McDonald, U.S. Air Force general (b. 1933)
  - Bobbie L. Sterne, politician (b. 1919)
  - Edward C. Taylor, chemist (b. 1923)
- November 23
  - Carol Neblett, operatic soprano (b. 1946)
  - Craig Tieszen, politician (b. 1949)
- November 24
  - Wesley L. Fox, U.S. Marine Corps officer and military writer (b. 1931)
  - Neil Gillman, Canadian-born rabbi and theologian (b. 1933)
  - Stephen Knapp, art photographer (b. 1947)
  - Lowen Kruse, politician (b. 1929)
  - Mitch Margo, doo-wop singer and songwriter (b. 1947)
  - John Thierry, football player (b. 1971)
- November 25
  - John Black, politician (b. 1933)
  - Bertha Calloway, museum director and activist (b. 1925)
  - Edward Fudge, lawyer and Christian theologian (b. 1944)
  - Ken Gray, football player (b. 1936)
  - Rance Howard, actor (b. 1928)
  - Steve "Snapper" Jones, basketball player and broadcaster (b. 1942)
  - John M. Lewellen, politician (b. 1930)
  - Bogdan Maglich, Serbian-born nuclear physicist (b. 1928)
  - Julio Oscar Mechoso, actor (b. 1955)
  - Harry Pregerson, federal judge (b. 1923)
- November 26
  - Ruth Bancroft, gardener, landscape architect and centenarian (b. 1908)
  - Garnett Thomas Eisele, federal judge (b. 1923)
  - Georg Iggers, German-born historian (b. 1926)
  - Peggy Vining, poet (b. 1929)
  - W. Marvin Watson, university president and presidential advisor (b. 1924)
- November 27
  - Bill Harris, politician (b. 1934)
  - Bud Moore, racing driver and NASCAR owner (b. 1925)
  - Robert Popwell, rock and jazz bassist (b. 1950)
  - Warren Spannaus, politician (b. 1930)
- November 28
  - Joseph N. Crowley, university president and cannabis activist (b. 1933)
  - Fritz Graf, National Football League official (b. 1922)
  - Don Moore, politician (b. 1928)
- November 29
  - Jerry Fodor, philosopher and cognitive scientist (b. 1935)
  - Fran Hopper, comics artist (b. 1922)
  - Charles E. Merrill Jr., educator and philanthropist (b. 1920)
  - Robert Walker, blues guitarist (b. 1937)
- November 30
  - Dick Gernert, baseball player, coach, and manager (b. 1928)
  - Gary Ingram, politician (b. 1933)
  - Jim Nabors, actor and singer (b. 1930)
  - Vincent Scully, architectural historian (b. 1920)

=== December ===
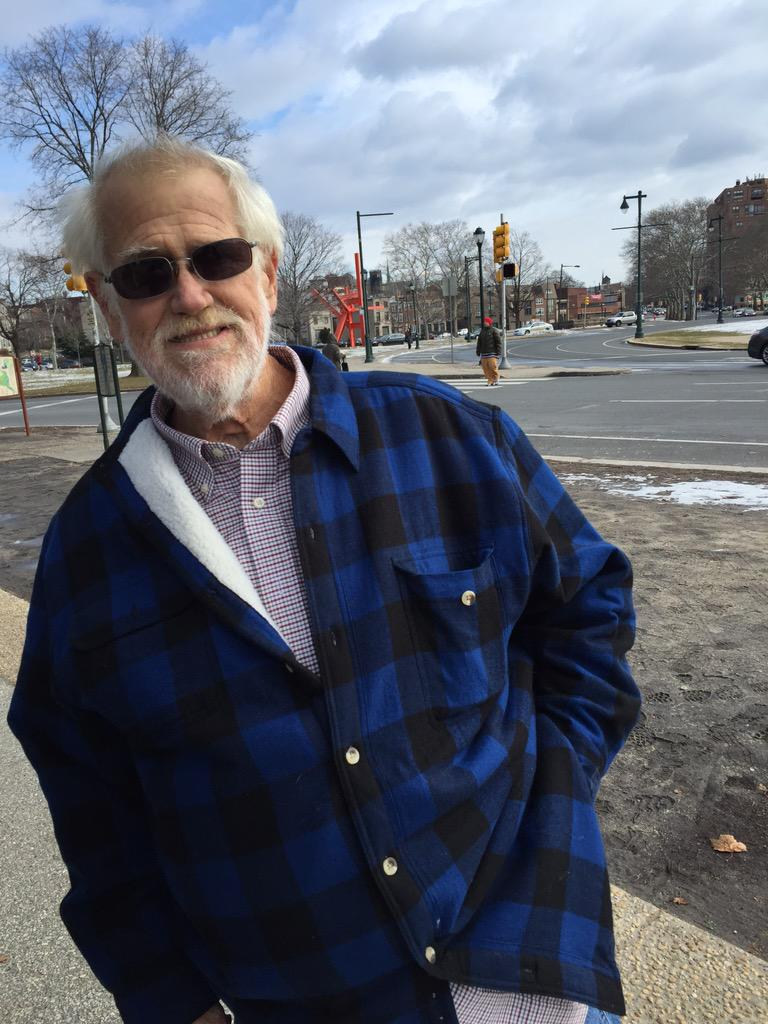
Angry Grandpa

- December 1
  - Arif Dirlik, Turkish-born historian (b. 1940)
  - Perry Wallace, basketball player and legal scholar (b. 1948)
  - Les Whitten, journalist and novelist (b. 1928)
- December 2
  - Mundell Lowe, jazz guitarist (b. 1922)
  - Marianne Means, political columnist and White House correspondent (b. 1934)
- December 3
  - John B. Anderson, politician; U.S. Representative from Illinois (1961–1981) (b. 1922)
  - Ernest A. Finney Jr., judge; South Carolina Supreme Court justice (b. 1931)
  - Leandro Rizzuto, billionaire businessman (b. 1938)
- December 4
  - Mary Louise Hancock, politician (b. 1920)
  - Alexander Harvey II, federal judge (b. 1923)
  - Rudolph G. Wilson, storyteller, writer, and academic (b. 1935)
  - Edward Zemprelli, politician (b. 1925)
- December 5
  - Maurice Green, virologist (b. 1926)
  - Ron Meyer, football coach (b. 1941)
- December 6
  - Conrad Brooks, actor (b. 1931)
  - Charles J. Cella, businessman and race horse owner (b. 1936)
  - William H. Gass, author and educator (b. 1924)
  - Kathleen Karr, author (b. 1946)
  - George E. Killian, basketball coach and administrator (b. 1924)
  - Tracy Stallard, baseball pitcher (b. 1937)
  - Cy Young, Olympic javelin thrower (b. 1928)
- December 7
  - MacDonald Becket, architect (b. 1928)
  - Fred J. Doocy, politician and banker (b. 1913)
  - Morton Estrin, classical pianist (b. 1923)
  - Sunny Murray, jazz drummer (b. 1936)
  - Steve Reevis, actor (b. 1962)
  - Roland Taylor, basketball player (b. 1946)
- December 8
  - James P. Cullen, U.S. Army general (b. 1945)
  - Howard Gottfried, film producer (b. 1923)
  - Tubby Raymond, football and baseball player and coach (b. 1926)
  - Gloria Ann Taylor, soul singer (b. 1944)
  - Morris Zelditch, sociologist (b. 1928)
- December 9
  - James Joseph Brady, lawyer and judge (b. 1944)
  - Allen C. Kelley, economist (b. 1937)
  - Marshall Loeb, business journalist and editor (b. 1929)
  - Joe Newton, track and field coach (b. 1929)
  - Tony Sumpter, football player (b. 1922)
  - Tom Zenk, professional wrestler and bodybuilder (b. 1958)
- December 10
  - Angry Grandpa, Internet personality (b. 1950)
  - Simeon Booker, journalist (b. 1918)
  - Bruce Brown, documentary filmmaker (b. 1937)
  - Curtis W. Harris, minister, civil rights activist, and politician (b. 1924)
  - Ronald W. Hodges, entomologist and lepidopterist (b. 1934)
  - Ray Kassar, business executive (b. 1928)
  - Harold Levine, mathematician
  - Roy Reed, journalist (b. 1930)
- December 11
  - Paul T. Fader, lawyer and politician (b. 1959)
  - Charles Robert Jenkins, U.S. Army soldier and defector to North Korea (b. 1940)
  - Vera Katz, politician (b. 1933)
  - John P. Yates, politician (b. 1921)
- December 12
  - Ken Bracey, baseball pitcher, manager, and scout (b. 1937)
  - Michael Clendenin, journalist (b. 1934)
  - Pat DiNizio, rock singer, songwriter, and guitarist (b. 1955)
  - Marvin Greenberg, mathematician (b. 1935)
  - Ed Lee, politician; 43rd Mayor of San Francisco (b. 1952)
  - Lewis Manilow, attorney, real estate developer, and philanthropist (b. 1927)
  - Willie Pickens, jazz pianist and composer (b. 1931)
  - Anthony Scaduto, journalist and biographer (b. 1932)
- December 13
  - Warrel Dane, heavy metal singer and songwriter (b. 1961)
  - John DeLamater, sociologist and sexologist (b. 1940)
  - Bette Howland, author and critic (b. 1937)
  - Bill Hudson, football player (b. 1935)
  - Dan Johnson, politician and minister (b. 1960)
  - Frank Lary, baseball pitcher (b. 1930)
  - Tommy Nobis, football player (b. 1943)
  - Martin Ransohoff, film and television producer (b. 1927)
  - Paul Yesawich, basketball player (b. 1923)
- December 14
  - Bob Givens, animator (b. 1918)
  - Charles Byron Renfrew, federal judge (b. 1928)
  - R. C. Sproul, Christian pastor and theologian (b. 1939)
  - Marilyn Ware, businesswoman and diplomat (b. 1943)
  - Lones Wigger, Olympic shooter (b. 1937)
- December 15
  - Darlanne Fluegel, actress (b. 1953).
  - Arthur S. Abramson, linguist (b. 1925)
  - Don Hogan Charles, photographer (b. 1938)
  - Pierre Hohenberg, French-American theoretical physicist (b. 1934)
- December 16
  - Ralph Carney, rock singer, songwriter, and musician (b. 1956)
  - Len Ceglarski, ice hockey player and coach (b. 1926)
  - Richard Dobson, country singer and songwriter (b. 1942)
  - E. Hunter Harrison, railway executive (b. 1944)
  - Keely Smith, jazz singer (b. 1928)
  - Robert G. Wilmers, billionaire banker (b. 1934)
- December 17
  - Johnny Fox, magician and stunt performer (b. 1953)
  - Doug Gallagher, baseball pitcher (b. 1940)
  - Bob Glidden, dragster driver (b. 1944)
  - Al Kelley, golfer (b. 1935)
  - Kevin Mahogany, jazz singer (b. 1958)
  - Bennett Malone, politician (b. 1944)
  - Edward Rowny, U.S. Army general and centenarian (b. 1917)
- December 18
  - Janet Benshoof, lawyer and reproductive rights activist (b. 1947)
  - William O. Harbach, television producer and director (b. 1919)
  - Larry Harris, music executive (b. 1947)
  - LeRoy Jolley, horse trainer (b. 1937)
- December 19
  - Clifford Irving, novelist, investigative reporter, and convicted fraudster (b. 1930)
  - Mamie Johnson, baseball pitcher (b. 1935)
  - Ruth McClendon, politician (b. 1943)
  - Jerry A. Moore Jr., Baptist minister and politician (b. 1918)
  - Frank North, football coach (b. 1924)
  - Richard Venture, actor (b. 1923)
  - Leo Welch, blues singer and musician (b. 1932)
- December 20
  - William Agee, business executive (b. 1938)
  - Carolyn Cohen, biologist and biophysicist (b. 1929)
  - Combat Jack, lawyer, hip-hop record producer, writer, and podcaster (b. 1964)
  - Charlie Hennigan, football player (b. 1935)
  - Bernard Francis Law, Roman Catholic prelate and civil rights activist (b. 1931)
  - George Mans, football player and coach and politician (b. 1940)
  - Diane Straus, magazine publisher (b. 1951)
  - Marilyn Tyler, operatic soprano (b. 1926)
- December 21
  - Dick Enberg, sportscaster (b. 1935)
  - March Fong Eu, Chinese-American politician (b. 1922)
  - Jim French, radio host and voice actor (b. 1928)
  - Dominic Frontiere, jazz accordionist, composer, and arranger (b. 1931)
  - D. Bruce MacPherson, Episcopal prelate (b. 1940)
  - Bruce McCandless II, aviator, electrical engineer, and astronaut (b. 1937)
  - Roswell Rudd, jazz trombonist (b. 1935)
  - Jerry Yellin, U.S. Army Air Forces fighter pilot (b. 1924)
- December 22
  - Lou Adler, radio journalist (b. 1929)
  - Pervis Atkins, football player (b. 1935)
  - Hal Bedsole, football player (b. 1941)
  - Viola Davis Brown, nurse and nursing administrator (b. 1930)
  - Domenic Cretara, painter (b. 1946)
  - Joseph F. Timilty, politician (b. 1938)
- December 28 – Rose Marie, actress, singer, and comedian (b. 1923)
- December 30
  - Erica Garner, civil rights activist (b. 1990)

== See also ==
- 2017 in American music
- 2017 in American soccer
- 2017 in American television
- List of American films of 2017
- Timeline of United States history (2010–present)
