= 1924 in the United States =

- Decades: 1900s; 1910s; 1920s; 1930s; 1940s
- See also: History of the United States (1918–1945); Timeline of United States history (1900–1929); List of years in the United States

The following events occurred in the United States in the year 1924.

== Incumbents ==
=== Federal government ===
- President: Calvin Coolidge (R-Massachusetts)
- Vice President: vacant
- Chief Justice: William Howard Taft (Ohio)
- Speaker of the House of Representatives: Frederick H. Gillett (R-Massachusetts)
- Senate Majority Leader:

Henry Cabot Lodge (R-Massachusetts) (until November 9)
vacant (November 9–28)
Charles Curtis (R-Kansas) (starting November 28)

- Congress: 68th

==== State governments ====
Governors and lieutenant governors

=== Governors ===
- Governor of Alabama: William W. Brandon (Democratic)
- Governor of Arizona: George W. P. Hunt (Democratic)
- Governor of Arkansas: Thomas Chipman McRae (Democratic)
- Governor of California: Friend Richardson (Republican)
- Governor of Colorado: William Ellery Sweet (Democratic)
- Governor of Connecticut: Charles A. Templeton (Republican)
- Governor of Delaware: William D. Denney (Republican)
- Governor of Florida: Cary A. Hardee (Democratic)
- Governor of Georgia: Clifford Walker (Democratic)
- Governor of Idaho: Charles C. Moore (Republican)
- Governor of Illinois: Len Small (Republican)
- Governor of Indiana: Warren T. McCray (Republican) (until April 30), Emmett Forrest Branch (Republican) (starting April 30)
- Governor of Iowa: Nathan E. Kendall (Republican)
- Governor of Kansas: Jonathan M. Davis (Democratic)
- Governor of Kentucky: William J. Fields (Democratic)
- Governor of Louisiana: John M. Parker (Democratic) (until May 13), Henry L. Fuqua (Democratic) (starting May 13)
- Governor of Maine: Percival Proctor Baxter (Republican)
- Governor of Maryland: Albert C. Ritchie (Democratic)
- Governor of Massachusetts: Channing H. Cox (Republican)
- Governor of Michigan: Alex Groesbeck (Republican)
- Governor of Minnesota: J. A. O. Preus (Republican)
- Governor of Mississippi:
  - until January 18: Lee M. Russell (Democratic)
  - January 18-22: vacant
  - starting January 22: Henry L. Whitfield (Democratic)
- Governor of Missouri: Arthur M. Hyde (Republican)
- Governor of Montana: Joseph M. Dixon (Republican)
- Governor of Nebraska: Charles W. Bryan (Democratic)
- Governor of Nevada: James G. Scrugham (Democratic)
- Governor of New Hampshire: Fred H. Brown (Democratic)
- Governor of New Jersey: George Sebastian Silzer (Democratic)
- Governor of New Mexico: James F. Hinkle (Democratic)
- Governor of New York: Al Smith (Democratic)
- Governor of North Carolina: Cameron Morrison (Democratic)
- Governor of North Dakota: Ragnvald A. Nestos (Republican)
- Governor of Ohio: A. Victor Donahey (Democratic)
- Governor of Oklahoma: Martin E. Trapp (Democratic)
- Governor of Oregon: Walter M. Pierce (Democratic)
- Governor of Pennsylvania: Gifford Pinchot (Republican)
- Governor of Rhode Island: William S. Flynn (Democratic)
- Governor of South Carolina: Thomas Gordon McLeod (Democratic)
- Governor of South Dakota: William H. McMaster (Republican)
- Governor of Tennessee: Austin Peay (Democratic)
- Governor of Texas: Pat Morris Neff (Democratic)
- Governor of Utah: Charles R. Mabey (Republican)
- Governor of Vermont: Redfield Proctor, Jr. (Republican)
- Governor of Virginia: Elbert Lee Trinkle (Democratic)
- Governor of Washington: Louis Folwell Hart (Republican)
- Governor of West Virginia: Ephraim F. Morgan (Republican)
- Governor of Wisconsin: John J. Blaine (Republican)
- Governor of Wyoming: William B. Ross (Democratic) (until October 2), Frank E. Lucas (Republican) (starting October 2)

=== Lieutenant governors ===
- Lieutenant Governor of Alabama: Charles S. McDowell (Democratic)
- Lieutenant Governor of California: Clement Calhoun Young (Republican)
- Lieutenant Governor of Colorado: Robert F. Rockwell (Republican)
- Lieutenant Governor of Connecticut: Hiram Bingham (Republican)
- Lieutenant Governor of Delaware: J. Danforth Bush (Republican)
- Lieutenant Governor of Idaho: H. C. Baldridge (Republican)
- Lieutenant Governor of Illinois: Fred E. Sterling (Republican)
- Lieutenant Governor of Indiana: Emmett Forrest Branch (Republican) (until April 30), James J. Nejdl (Republican) (starting April 30)
- Lieutenant Governor of Iowa: John Hammill (Republican)
- Lieutenant Governor of Kansas: Ben Sanford Paulen (Republican)
- Lieutenant Governor of Kentucky: Henry Denhardt (Democratic)
- Lieutenant Governor of Louisiana:
  - until April 12: Hewitt Bouanchaud (Democratic)
  - April 12-May 13: Delos R. Johnson (Democratic)
  - starting May 13: Oramel H. Simpson (Democratic)
- Lieutenant Governor of Massachusetts: Alvan T. Fuller (Republican)
- Lieutenant Governor of Michigan: Thomas Read (Republican)
- Lieutenant Governor of Minnesota: Louis L. Collins (Republican)
- Lieutenant Governor of Mississippi: Homer H. Casteel (Democratic) (until January 22), Dennis Murphree (Democratic) (starting January 22)
- Lieutenant Governor of Missouri: Hiram Lloyd (Republican)
- Lieutenant Governor of Montana: Nelson Story Jr. (Republican)
- Lieutenant Governor of Nebraska: Fred G. Johnson (Republican)
- Lieutenant Governor of Nevada: Maurice J. Sullivan (Democratic)
- Lieutenant Governor of New Mexico: Jose A. Baca (Democratic) (until May), vacant (starting May)
- Lieutenant Governor of New York: George R. Lunn (Democratic) (until end of December 31)
- Lieutenant Governor of North Carolina: William B. Cooper (Democratic)
- Lieutenant Governor of North Dakota: Frank H. Hyland (Republican)
- Lieutenant Governor of Ohio: Earl D. Bloom (Democratic)
- Lieutenant Governor of Oklahoma: vacant
- Lieutenant Governor of Pennsylvania: David J. Davis (Republican)
- Lieutenant Governor of Rhode Island: Felix A. Toupin (Republican)
- Lieutenant Governor of South Carolina: E. B. Jackson (Democratic)
- Lieutenant Governor of South Dakota: Carl Gunderson (Republican)
- Lieutenant Governor of Tennessee: Eugene J. Bryan (Democratic)
- Lieutenant Governor of Texas: Thomas Whitfield Davidson (Democratic)
- Lieutenant Governor of Vermont: Franklin S. Billings (Republican)
- Lieutenant Governor of Virginia: Junius Edgar West (Democratic)
- Lieutenant Governor of Washington: William J. Coyle (Republican)
- Lieutenant Governor of Wisconsin: George F. Comings (Republican)

== Events ==
=== January–March ===
- January 10 – American media company Cohn-Brandt-Cohn (CBC) Film Sales Corporation (founded 1918) officially reorganizes as Columbia Pictures Corporation.
- February 8 – Capital punishment: Gee Jon suffers the first state execution using a gas chamber in the United States, at Nevada State Prison.
- February 9 – Canada's National Hockey League expands to the United States for the first time with the inclusion of the Boston Bruins.
- February 12 – Rhapsody in Blue, by George Gershwin, is first performed in New York City, at Aeolian Hall.
- February 14 – International Business Machines (IBM) is founded in New York State.
- February 16–26 – Dock strikes break out in various U.S. harbors.
- February 22 – Calvin Coolidge becomes the first president of the United States to deliver a radio broadcast from the White House.
- March 8 – The Castle Gate mine disaster kills 172 coal miners in Utah.

=== April–June ===
- April 16 – American media company Metro Goldwyn Mayer (MGM) is founded in Los Angeles, California, through the merger of Metro Pictures, Goldwyn Pictures, and Louis B. Mayer Pictures.
- May 3 – The Aleph Zadik Aleph, the oldest Jewish youth fraternity, is founded in Omaha, Nebraska.
- May 10 – J. Edgar Hoover is appointed head of the Federal Bureau of Investigation.
- May 21 – University of Chicago students Richard Loeb and Nathan Leopold, Jr. murder 14-year-old Bobby Franks, in a thrill killing. The event will inspire the 1929 play Rope.
- May 26 – The Asian Exclusion Act is enacted, banning all Asian immigration to the United States. It was a slap in the face to Japan after their participation as a principal ally in WWI, and is seen as the spark that spurred Japan's alliance with Germany and down the path to World War II.
- June 2 – U.S. President Calvin Coolidge signs the Indian Citizenship Act of 1924 into law, granting citizenship to all Native Americans born within the territorial limits of the United States.
- June 12 – Rondout Heist: Six men of the Egan's Rats gang rob a mail train in Rondout, Illinois; the robbery is later found to have been an inside job.
- June 23 – American airman Russell L. Maughan flies from New York to San Francisco in 21 hours and 48 minutes on a dawn-to-dusk flight in a Curtiss pursuit.
- June 24–July 9 – The 1924 Democratic National Convention takes a record 103 ballots to nominate John W. Davis of West Virginia as Democratic Party candidate to oppose Calvin Coolidge in the presidential election.

=== July–September ===
- July 12 through September 18 - The * United States occupation of the Dominican Republic, which began in 1916, ends as the Dominican government is reestablish under a Third Republic with Horacio Vásquez as the new president and American armed forces withdrawing from the country.
- September 9 – The Hanapepe massacre occurs on Kauai, Hawaii.
- September 24 – First case report in the Los Angeles pneumonic plague outbreak

=== October–December ===
- October 9 – Soldier Field, the home of the Chicago Bears opens.
- October 10
  - The Alpha Delta Gamma fraternity is founded at the Lake Shore Campus of Loyola University, Chicago.
  - The Washington Senators defeat the New York Giants (baseball), 4 games to 3.
- November – The last known sighting of a California grizzly bear is recorded, by Colonel John R. White at Sequoia National Park.
- November 4
  - 1924 United States presidential election: Republican Calvin Coolidge defeats Democrat John W. Davis and Progressive Wisconsin Senator Robert M. La Follette
  - Nellie Tayloe Ross of Wyoming is elected as the first woman governor in the United States.
- November 15 – In Los Angeles, silent film director Thomas Ince ("The Father of the Western") meets publishing tycoon William Randolph Hearst to work out a deal. When Ince dies a few days later, reportedly of a heart attack, rumors soon surface that he was murdered by Hearst.
- November 27 – In New York City, the first Macy's Thanksgiving Day Parade (formerly known as the Macy's Christmas Parade) is held.
- December 1 – George Gershwin's Lady Be, Good, including the song "Fascinating Rhythm", (book by Guy Bolton and Fred Thompson, lyrics by Ira Gershwin) premieres in New York City.

=== Undated ===
- Alice Vanderbilt Morris, a wealthy heiress, founds the International Auxiliary Language Association in New York City.
- U.S. bootleggers begin to use Thompson submachine guns.
- The earth inductor compass is developed by Morris Titterington at the Pioneer Instrument Company in Brooklyn, New York.

=== Ongoing ===
- Lochner era (c. 1897–c. 1937)
- U.S. occupation of Haiti (1915–1934)
- Prohibition (1920–1933)
- Roaring Twenties (1920–1929)

== Births ==
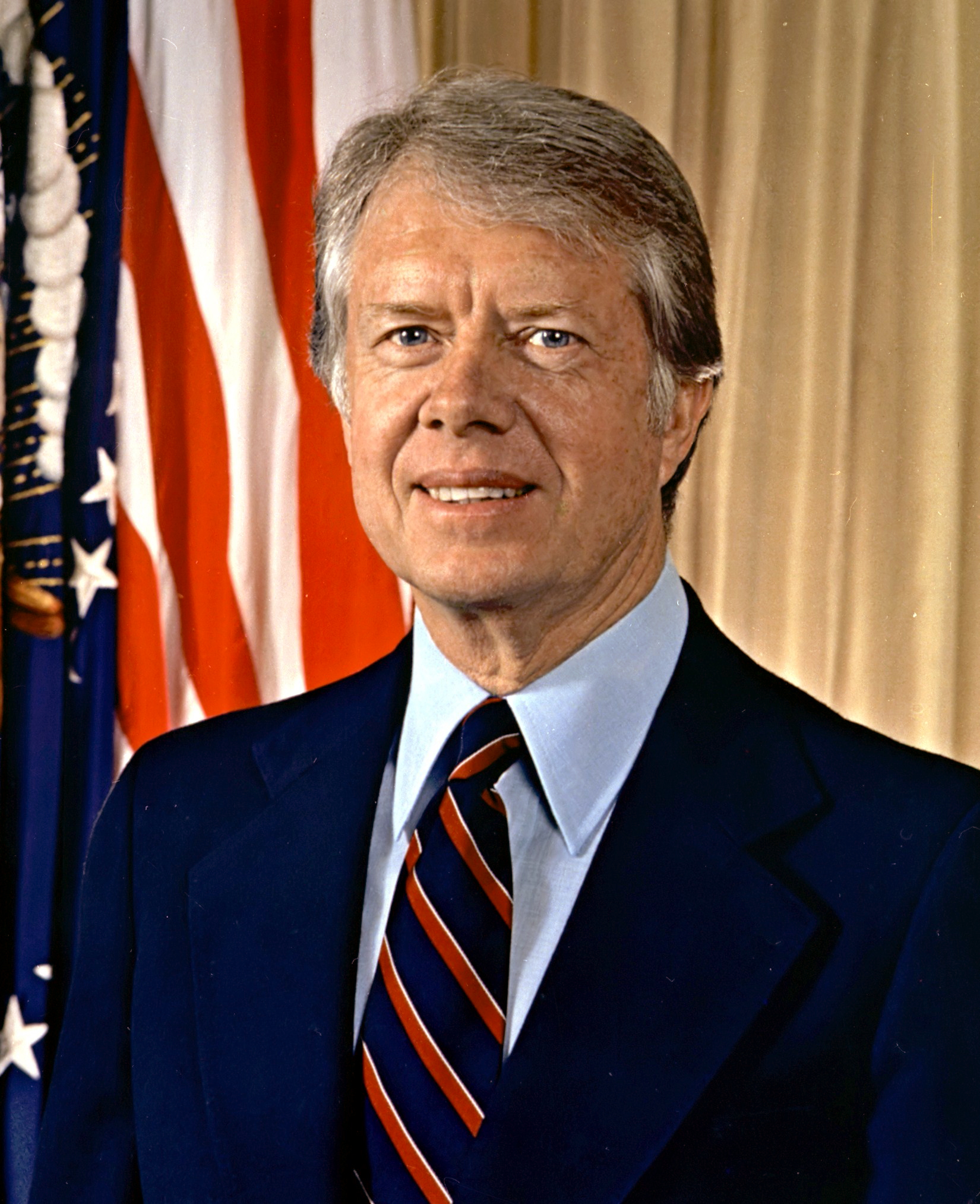
Jimmy Carter, the 39th president (1977–1981)

George H. W. Bush, the 41st president (1989–1993)

Two U.S. presidents were born in the year 1924

=== January ===
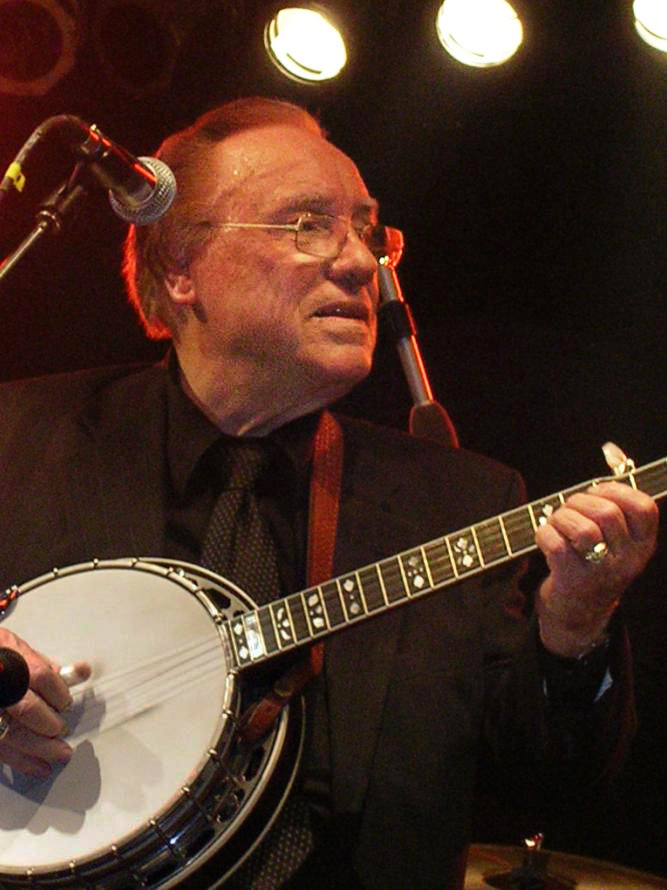
Earl Scruggs

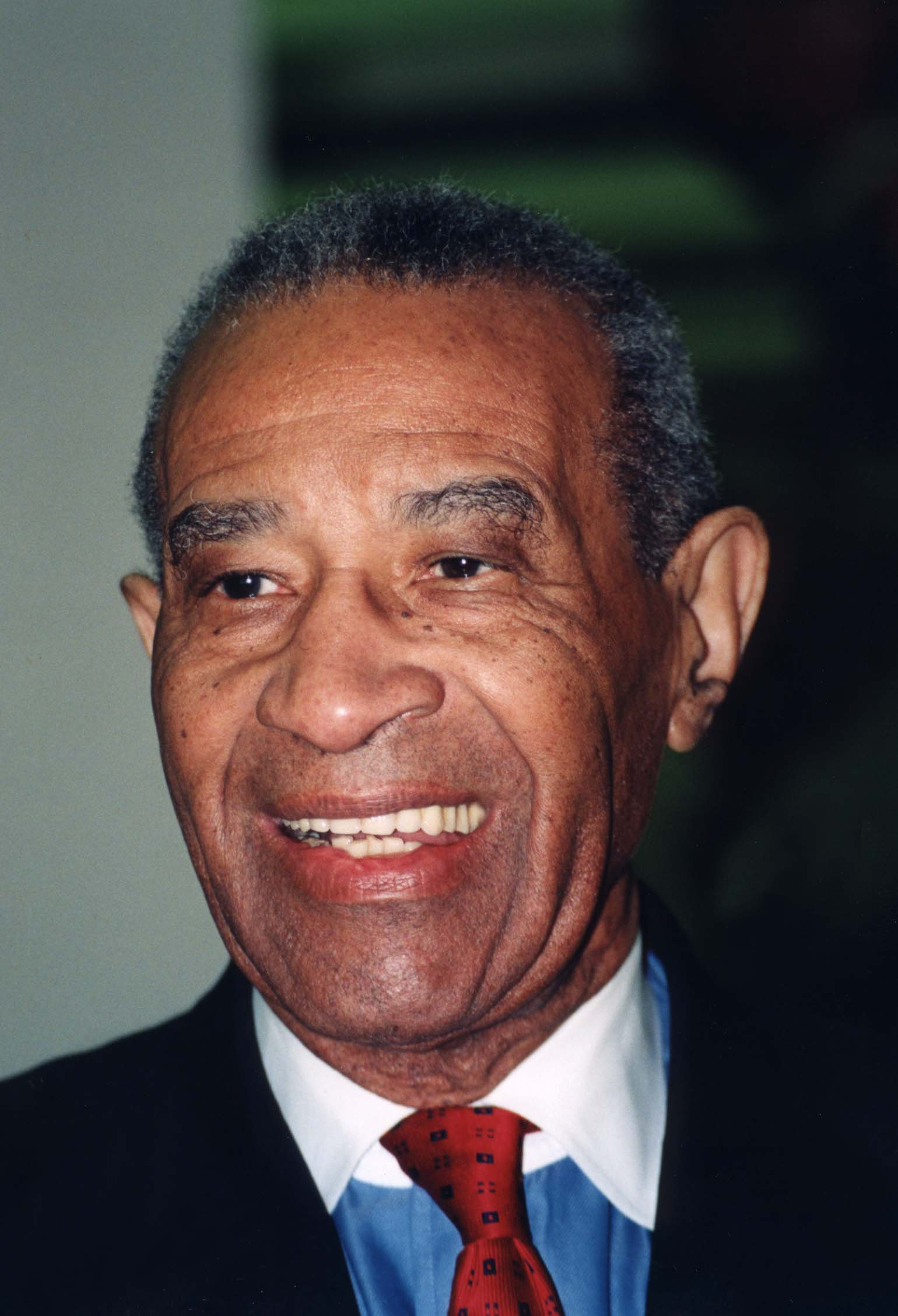
Max Roach

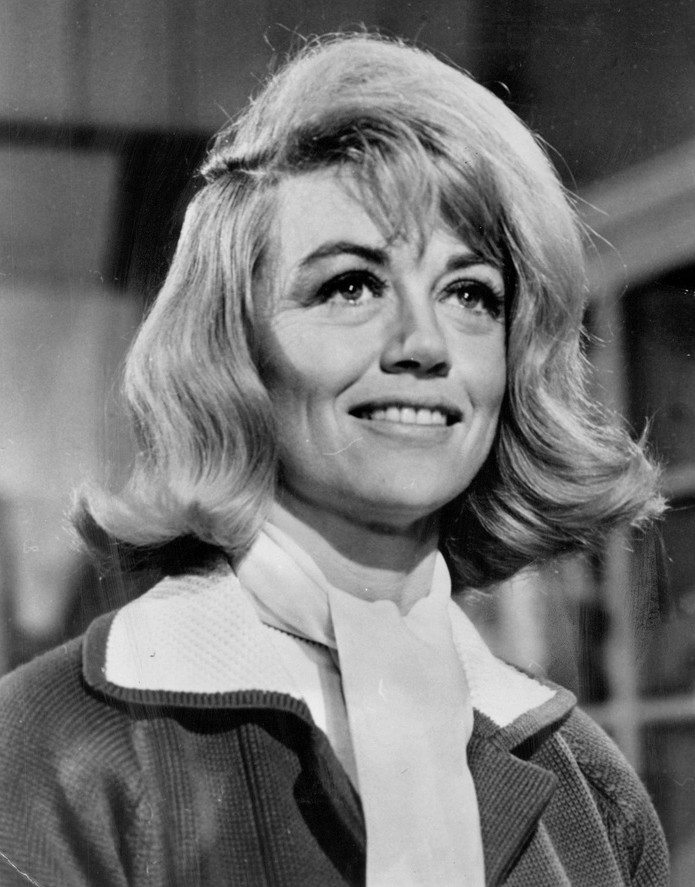
Dorothy Malone

- January 1 – Charlie Munger, businessman and philanthropist (d. 2023)
- January 4
  - Walter Ris, freestyle swimmer (d. 1989)
  - Charles Thone, politician (d. 2018)
- January 5 – Glenn Boyer, historian and author (d. 2013)
- January 6 – Earl Scruggs, musician (d. 2012)
- January 7 – Gene L. Coon, screenwriter and producer (d. 1973)
- January 8 – James Clinkscales Hill, jurist (d. 2017)
- January 9 – Mary Kaye, guitarist and singer (d. 2007)
- January 10
  - Earl Bakken, engineer and businessman, inventor of the modern Artificial pacemaker (d. 2018)
  - Max Roach, African-American percussionist, drummer and composer (d. 2007)
- January 11
  - Don Cherry, pop singer (d. 2018)
  - Sam B. Hall Jr., politician (d. 1994)
  - Slim Harpo, musician (d. 1970)
- January 12 – Chris Chase (also known as Irene Kane), model, film actress, writer and journalist (d. 2013)
- January 13 – Lillian B. Rubin, writer, professor, psychotherapist and sociologist (d. 2014)
- January 14
  - Carole Cook, actress and singer (d. 2023)
  - Guy Williams, actor (d. 1989)
- January 19 – Nicholas Colasanto, actor and television director (d. 1985)
- January 23 – Frank Lautenberg, politician (d. 2013)
- January 25
  - Lou Groza, American football player and coach (d. 2000)
  - Rollie Seltz, basketball player (d. 2022)
  - Speedy West, musician (d. 2003)
- January 26 – Annette Strauss, philanthropist and politician (d. 1998)
- January 28 – Betty Tucker, baseball player (d. 2012)
- January 30
  - Lloyd Alexander, writer (d. 2007)
  - Dorothy Malone, actress (d. 2018)

=== February ===
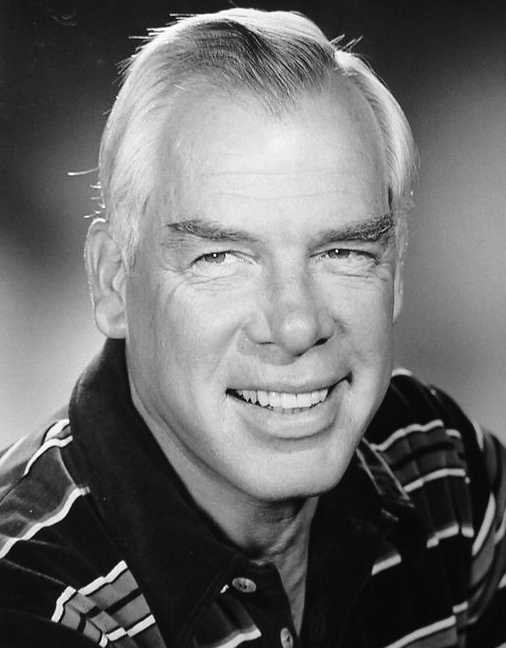
Lee Marvin

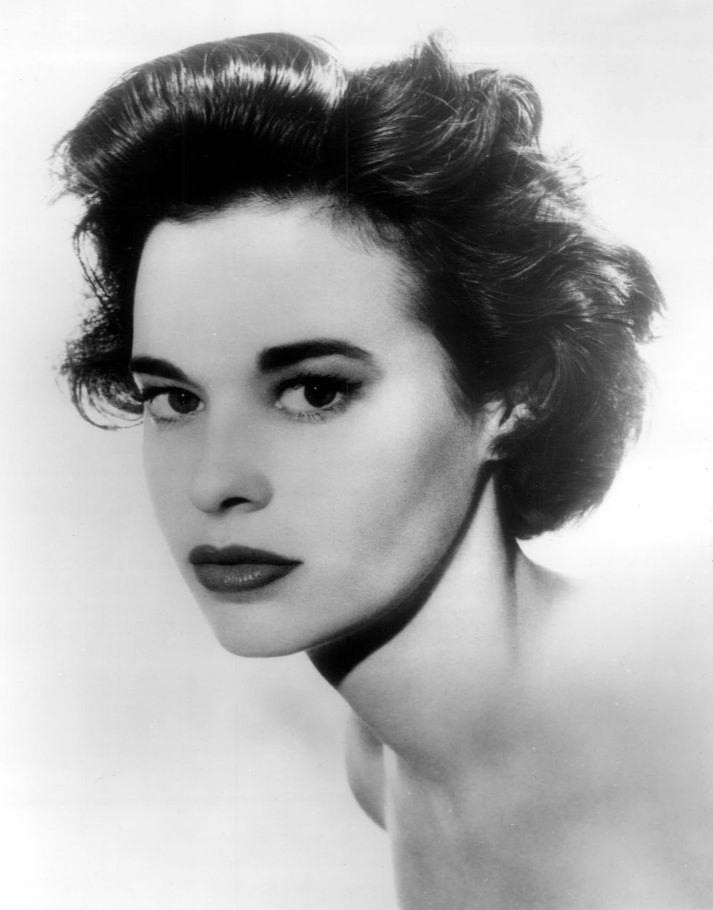
Gloria Vanderbilt

- February 1 – Richard Hooker, writer and surgeon (d. 1997)
- February 4 – Dorothy Harrell, professional baseball player (d. 2011)
- February 7 – Catherine Small Long, politician (d. 2019)
- February 8 – Joe Black, African-American baseball player (d. 2002)
- February 10 – Randy Van Horne, singer and musician (d. 2007)
- February 11 – Budge Patty, tennis player (d. 2021)
- February 14 – Gabe Pressman, journalist (d. 2017)
- February 15 – Toni Arden, singer (d. 2012)
- February 16 – Frank Saul, basketball player (d. 2019)
- February 17 – Margaret Truman, novelist and only child of U.S. President Harry S. Truman and Bess Truman (d. 2008)
- February 19 – Lee Marvin, actor (d. 1987)
- February 20
  - Donald M. Fraser, politician (d. 2019)
  - Gerson Goldhaber, German-American physicist and astrophysicist (d. 2010)
  - Gloria Vanderbilt, socialite, artist and fashion designer (d. 2019)
- February 21 – William Hathaway, politician and lawyer (d. 2013)
- February 28
  - Bettye Ackerman, actress (d. 2006)
  - Christopher C. Kraft Jr., aerospace engineer (d. 2019)
- February 29 – Al Rosen, baseball player (d. 2015)

=== March ===
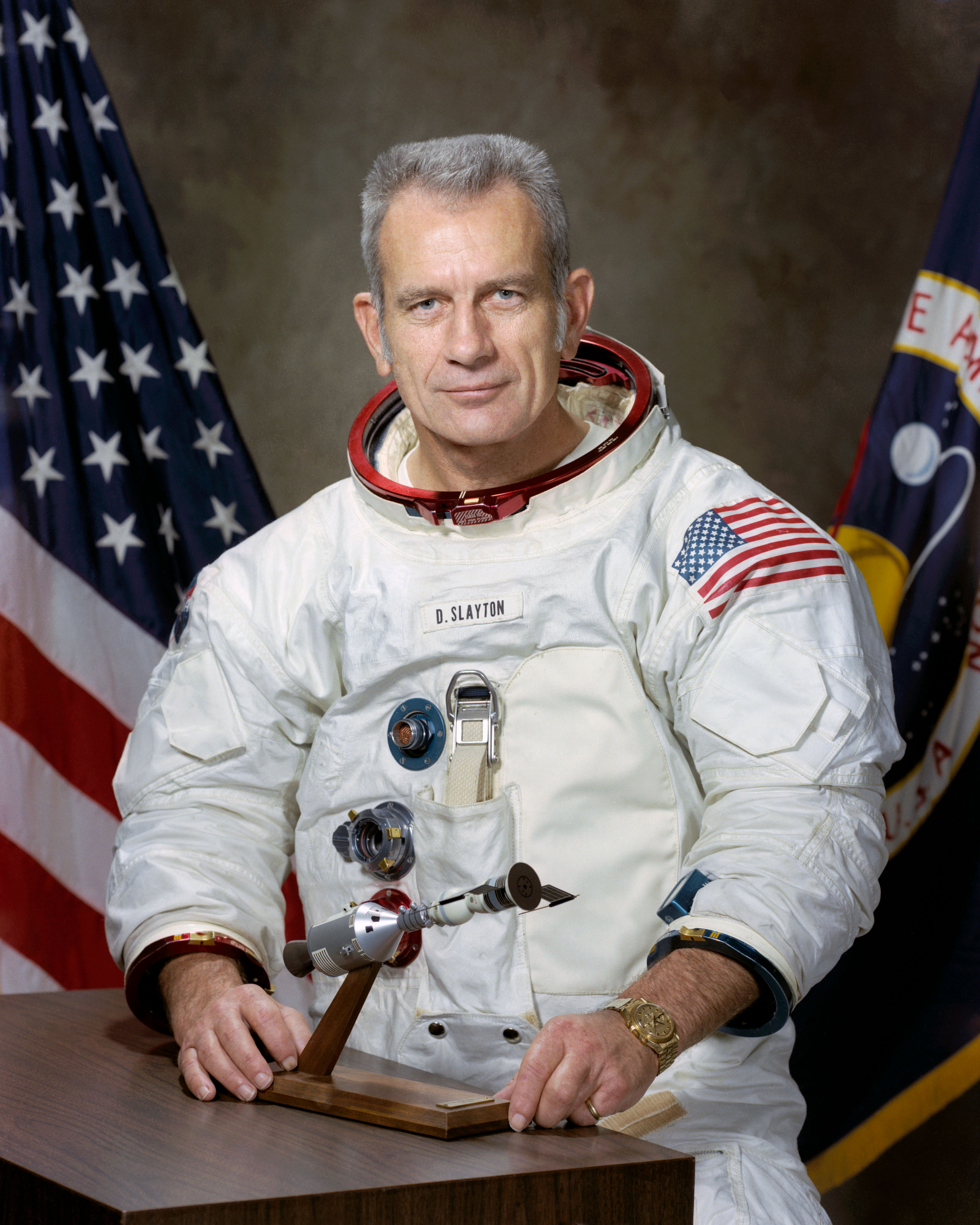
Deke Slayton

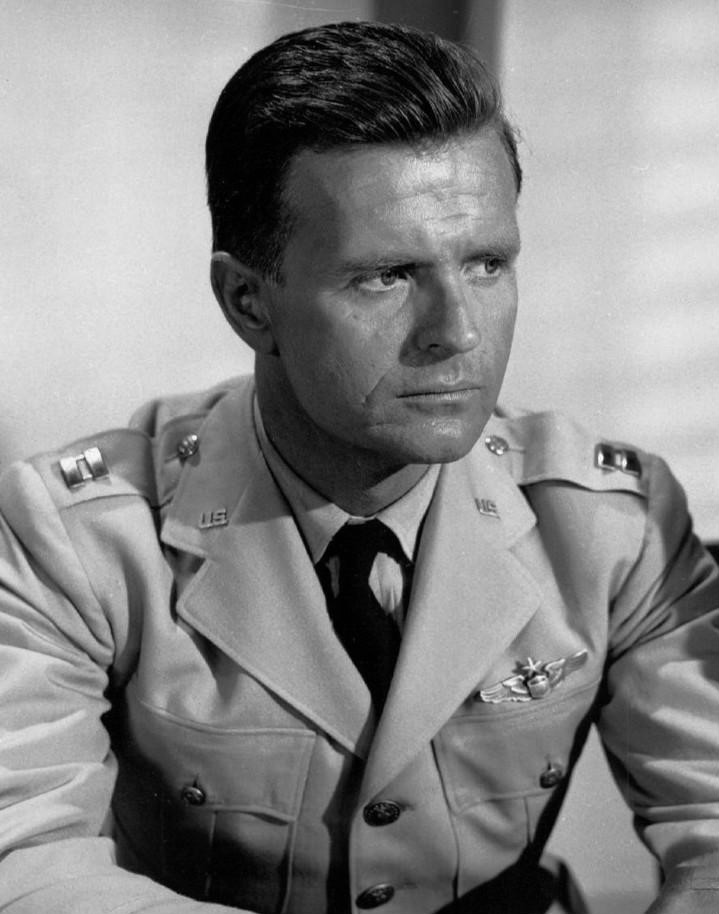
Philip Abbott

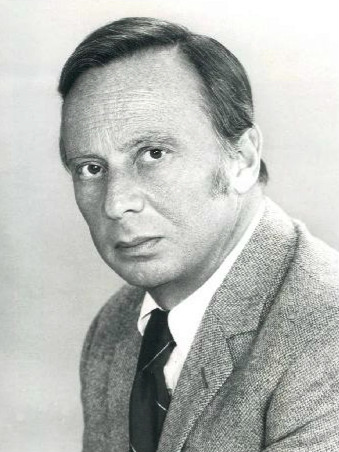
Norman Fell

- March 1 – Deke Slayton, American astronaut (d. 1993)
- March 3 – Isadore Singer, American mathematician (d. 2021)
- March 4 – Kenneth O'Donnell, American political consultant, aide to U.S. President John F. Kennedy (d. 1977)
- March 6
  - Ed Mierkowicz, American baseball player (d. 2017)
  - William H. Webster, American lawyer and jurist (d. 2025)
- March 9
  - Herbert Gold, American novelist (d. 2023)
  - George Haines, American swimmer and coach (d. 2006)
  - William Hamilton, American theologian (d. 2012)
  - Ben Schadler, American basketball player (d. 2015)
- March 17 – Edith Savage-Jennings, African-American civil rights leader (d. 2017)
- March 20 – Philip Abbott, American actor (d. 1998)
- March 22
  - Al Neuharth, American businessman and journalist (d. 2013)
  - Bill Wendell, American TV announcer (d. 1999)
  - Lionel Wilson, American voice actor (d. 2003)
- March 23 – Bette Nesmith Graham, American typist, commercial artist, and inventor (d. 1980)
- March 24
  - Lois Andrews, American actress (d. 1968)
  - Norman Fell, American actor (d. 1998)
- March 25
  - Roberts Blossom, American actor and poet (d. 2011)
  - Julia Perry, African-American composer (d. 1979)
- March 27 – Sarah Vaughan, African-American jazz singer (d. 1990)
- March 28 – Byrd Baylor, American novelist, essayist and author (d. 2021)
- March 29 – Jimmy Work, American singer-songwriter (d. 2018)
- March 31 – Kathleen O'Malley, American actress (d. 2019)

=== April ===
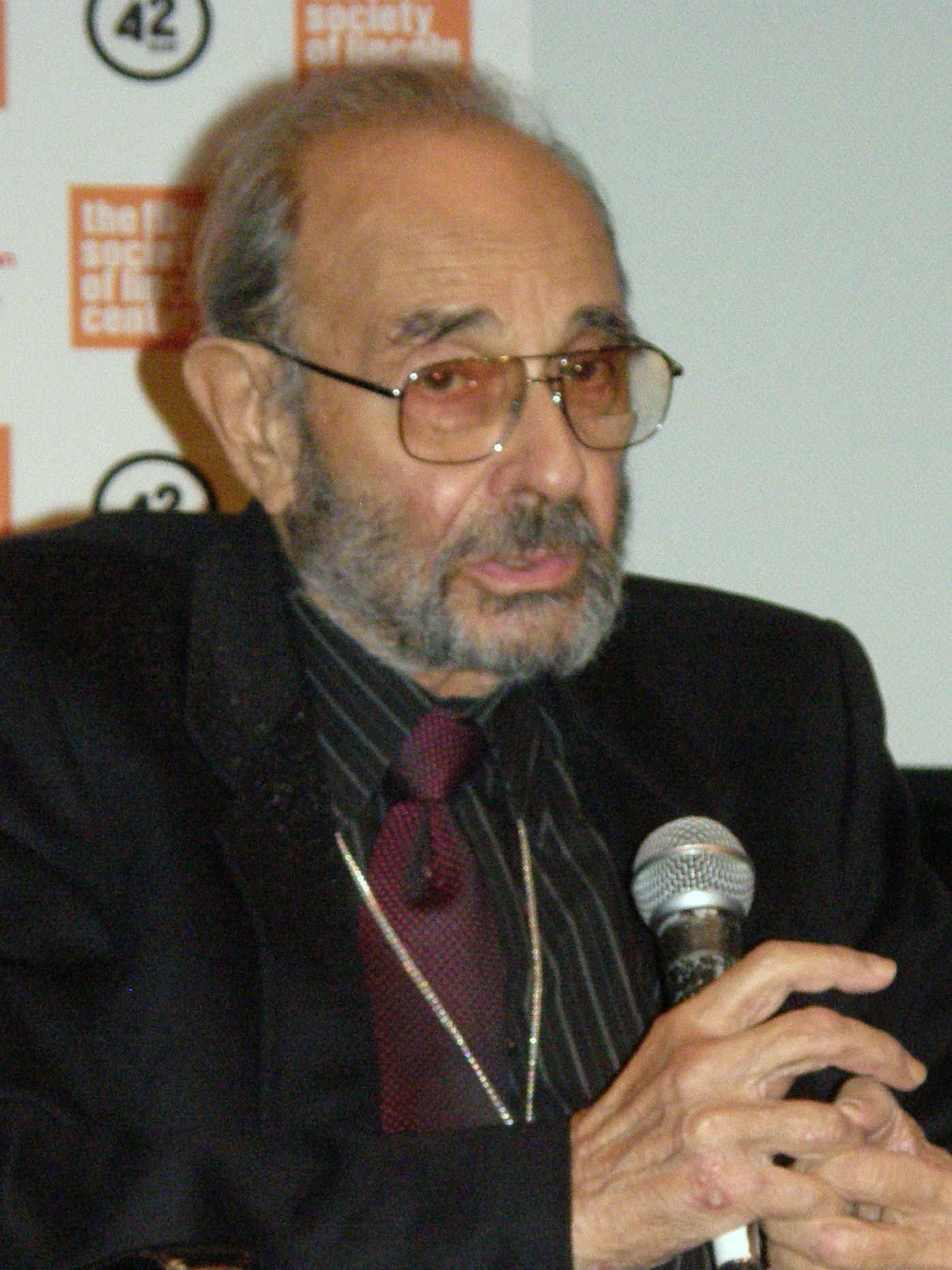
Stanley Donen

- April 1 – Brendan Byrne, American politician, statesman, and prosecutor (d. 2018)
- April 2 – Delwin Jones, American politician (d. 2018)
- April 3 – Marlon Brando, American actor (d. 2004)
- April 4
  - Gil Hodges, American baseball player (d. 1972)
  - Joye Hummel, American comic book author (d. 2021)
  - Noreen Nash, American actress (d. 2023)
- April 5 – John Fraser Hart, American geographer (d. 2024)
- April 6 – Jimmy Roberts, American singer (d. 1999)
- April 8 – Bob Mann, American football player (d. 2006)
- April 9 – Milburn G. Apt, American test pilot (d. 1956)
- April 13
  - Jack Chick, American fundamentalist Christian illustrator and publisher (d. 2016)
  - Stanley Donen, American film director and choreographer (d. 2019)
- April 14 – Shorty Rogers, American jazz trumpeter (d. 1994)
- April 16
  - Henry Mancini, American composer and arranger (d. 1994)
  - Rudy Pompilli, American musician (d. 1976)
- April 18
  - Clarence "Gatemouth" Brown, American blues musician (d. 2005)
  - Henry Hyde, American politician (d. 2007)
  - Jim Zapp, American baseball player (d. 2016)
- April 23
  - Chuck Harmon, American baseball player and scout (d. 2019)
  - Bobby Rosengarden, American jazz drummer (d. 2007)
- April 25 – Art Schallock, American baseball player (d. 2025)
- April 28
  - Blossom Dearie, American jazz singer and pianist. (d. 2009)
  - Emily W. Sunstein, American campaigner, political activist and biographer (d. 2007)
- April 30 – Sheldon Harnick, American lyricist (d. 2023)

=== May ===
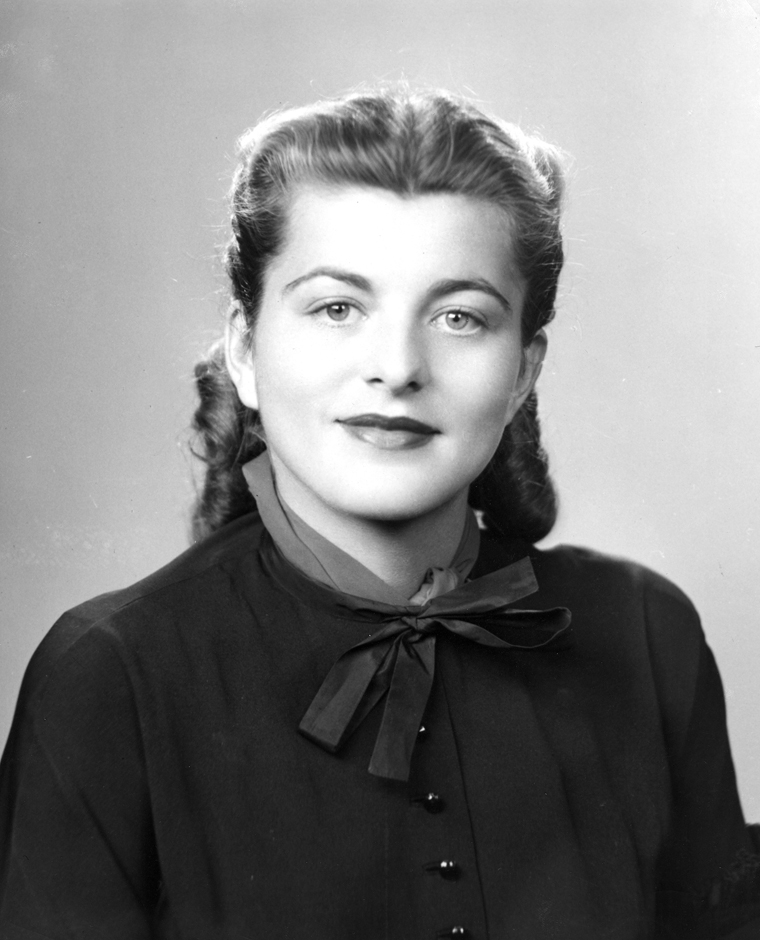
Patricia Kennedy Lawford

- May 1
  - Art Fleming, American actor and game show host (d. 1995)
  - Evelyn Boyd Granville, American mathematician, computer scientist and academic (d. 2023)
  - Big Maybelle, American R&B singer (d. 1972)
- May 2 – Ladislava Bakanic, American gymnast (d. 2021)
- May 3 – Isadore Singer, American mathematician (d. 2021)
- May 6 – Patricia Kennedy Lawford, American socialite (d. 2006)
- May 11 – Ninfa Laurenzo, American businessman, founder of Ninfa's (d. 2001)
- May 16 – Frank Mankiewicz, American journalist, presidential campaign press secretary (d. 2014)
- May 18
  - Jack Barlow, American country music singer (d. 2011)
  - Priscilla Pointer, American actress
  - Jack Whitaker, American sportscaster (d. 2019)
- May 21 – Peggy Cass, American actress and comedian (d. 1999)
- May 24 – Philip Pearlstein, American soldier, painter (d. 2022)
- May 29 – Pepper Paire, American female baseball player (d. 2013)
- May 31 – Patricia Roberts Harris, American administrator (d. 1985)

=== June ===
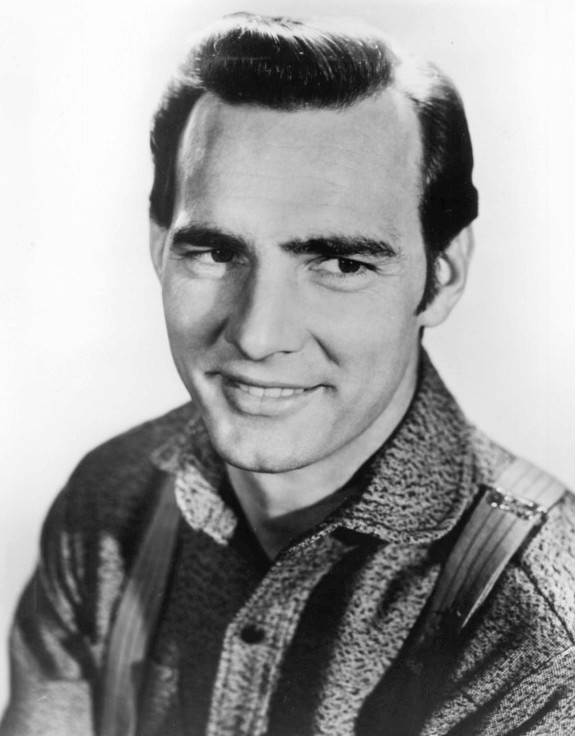
Dennis Weaver

George H. W. Bush

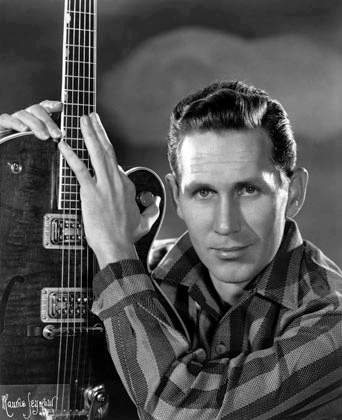
Chet Atkins

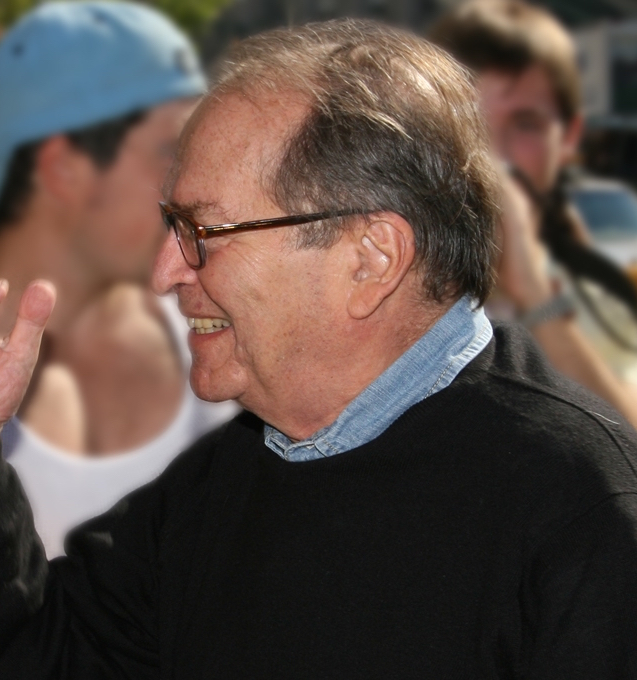
Sidney Lumet

- June 1 – William Sloane Coffin, American clergyman (d. 2006)
- June 3
  - Bernard Glasser, American film producer, director (d. 2014)
  - Herk Harvey, American film director (d. 1996)
  - Jimmy Rogers, American musician (d. 1997)
- June 4 – Dennis Weaver, American actor (d. 2006)
- June 5
  - Lou Brissie, baseball player and scout (d. 2013)
  - Art Donovan, American football player and radio host (d. 2013)
- June 6
  - Robert Abernathy, American science fiction author (d. 1990)
  - W. Marvin Watson, American presidential advisor, Postmaster General (d. 2017)
- June 7 – Edward Field, poet and author (d. 2026)
- June 8
  - Sheldon Allman, American-Canadian actor and singer-songwriter (d. 2002)
  - Lyn Nofziger, American journalist and author (d. 2006)
  - David Pines, American physicist (d. 2018)
- June 12 – George H. W. Bush, American politician, 41st president of the United States from 1989 to 1993 & 43rd vice president of the United States from 1981 to 1989 (d. 2018)
- June 20 – Chet Atkins, American guitarist, record producer (d. 2001)
- June 22 – John C. Whitcomb, American theologian (d. 2020)
- June 23
  - Frank Bolle, American comic strip artist, comic book artist and illustrator (d. 2020)
  - June Brooks, American businesswoman (d. 2010)
- June 24
  - Leonard Everett Fisher, American artist known best for children's books (d. 2024)
  - Yoshito Takamine, American politician (d. 2015)
- June 25
  - Martin J. Klein, American historian and physicist (d. 2009)
  - Sidney Lumet, American film director (d. 2011)
- June 27
  - Charles Norman Shay, American Penobscot tribal elder, writer and decorated veteran of both World War II and the Korean War (d. 2025)
  - Paul Conrad, American cartoonist (d. 2010)
- June 26
  - Richard Bull, American actor (d. 2014)
  - James W. McCord Jr., American CIA officer (d. 2017)
- June 29
  - Philip H. Hoff, American politician (d. 2018)
  - Ezra Laderman, American composer (d. 2015)

=== July ===
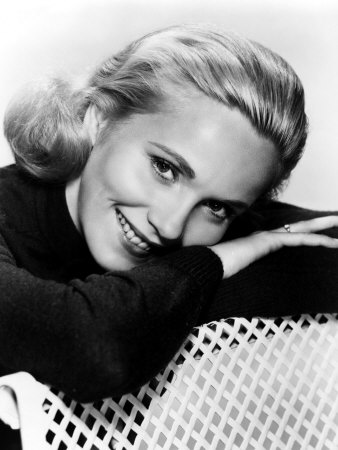
Eva Marie Saint

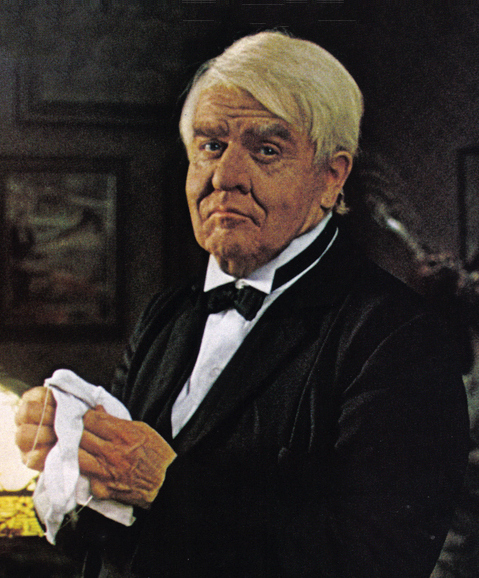
Pat Hingle

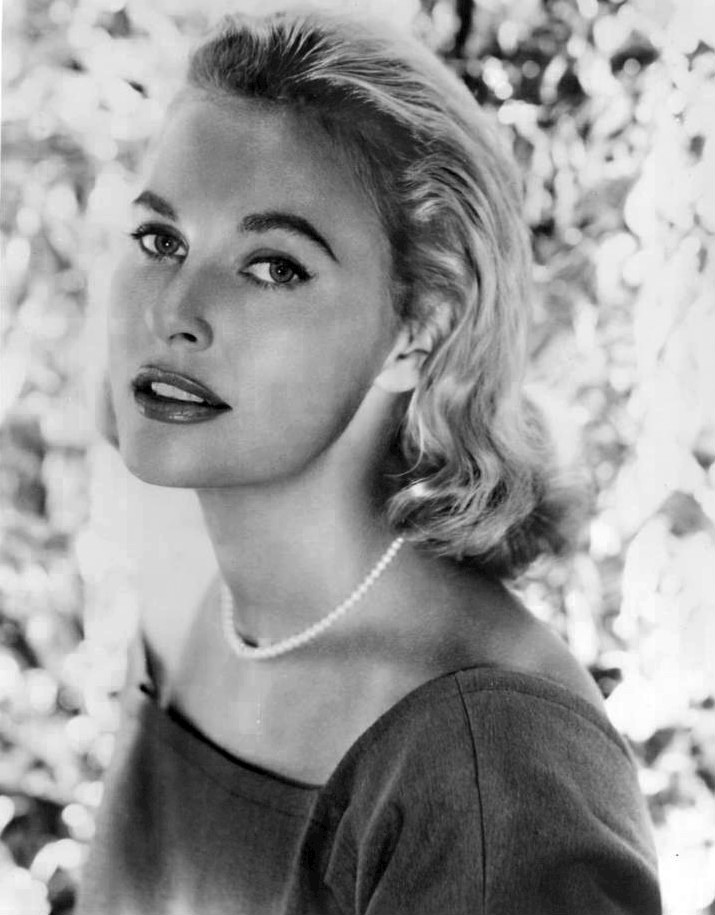
Lola Albright

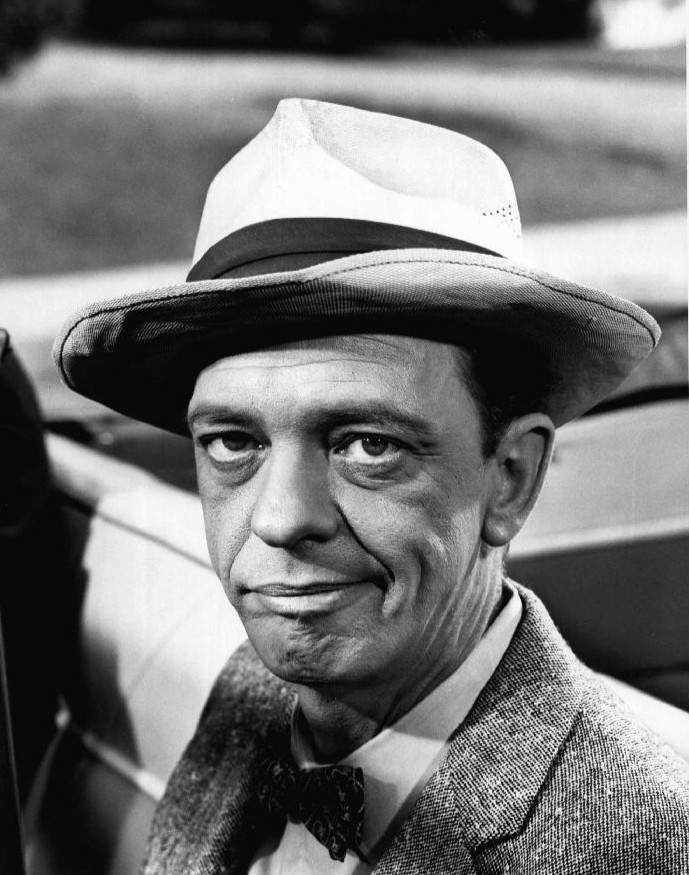
Don Knotts

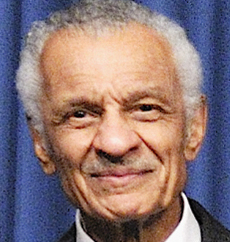
C. T. Vivian

- July 1
  - Ralph Parr, American double-flying ace (d. 2012)
  - Curtis W. Harris, American minister, civil rights activist and Virginia politician (d. 2017)
  - Richard Longaker, American political scientist (d. 2018)
- July 2 – Charley Winner, American football player (d. 2023)
- July 4
  - Eva Marie Saint, American actress (d. 2026)
  - Harry Stewart Jr., American fighter pilot (d. 2025)
- July 6
  - Ernest Graves Jr., United States Army officer (d. 2019)
  - Robert Michael White, American military aircraft test pilot, fighter pilot, electrical engineer and major general (d. 2010)
- July 7 – Sam Cathcart, American football halfback, defensive back (d. 2015)
- July 8 – Charles C. Droz, American politician (d. 2025)
- July 10 – Gloria Stroock, American actress (d. 2024)
- July 11
  - F. James Rutherford, American science professor (d. 2021)
  - Oscar Wyatt, American businessman, self-made millionaire (d. 2025)
  - Al Federoff, American professional baseball infielder, manager (d. 2011)
- July 12 – Shirley Neil Pettis, American politician (d. 2016)
- July 14
  - Val Avery, American character actor (d. 2009)
  - Warren Giese, American football player, coach and politician (d. 2013)
- July 15 – Jeremiah Denton, American politician (d. 2014)
- July 16
  - James L. Greenfield, American journalist and public official (d. 2024)
  - Bess Myerson, American politician, model and television actress (d. 2014)
- July 18 – Will D. Campbell, American minister, author and activist (d. 2013)
- July 19
  - Pat Hingle, American actor (d. 2009)
  - Frank Ivancie, American businessman and politician (d. 2019)
  - Arthur Rankin Jr., American film director, producer and co-founder of Rankin/Bass Productions (d. 2014)
- July 20 – Lola Albright, American singer, actress (d. 2017)
- July 21 – Don Knotts, American comedic actor (d. 2006)
- July 22 – Margaret Whiting, American singer (d. 2011)
- July 23 – Avern Cohn, American judge (d. 2022)
- July 24 – Paul Meier, American statistician (d. 2011)
- July 25 – Frank Church, American politician (d. 1984)
- July 28
  - Anne Braden, American civil rights activist (d. 2006)
  - C. T. Vivian, American civil rights activist, minister and author (d. 2020)
- July 29
  - Lillian Faralla, American female professional baseball player (d. 2019)
  - Robert Horton, American actor, singer (d. 2016)
- July 30 – William H. Gass, American novelist (d. 2017)

=== August ===
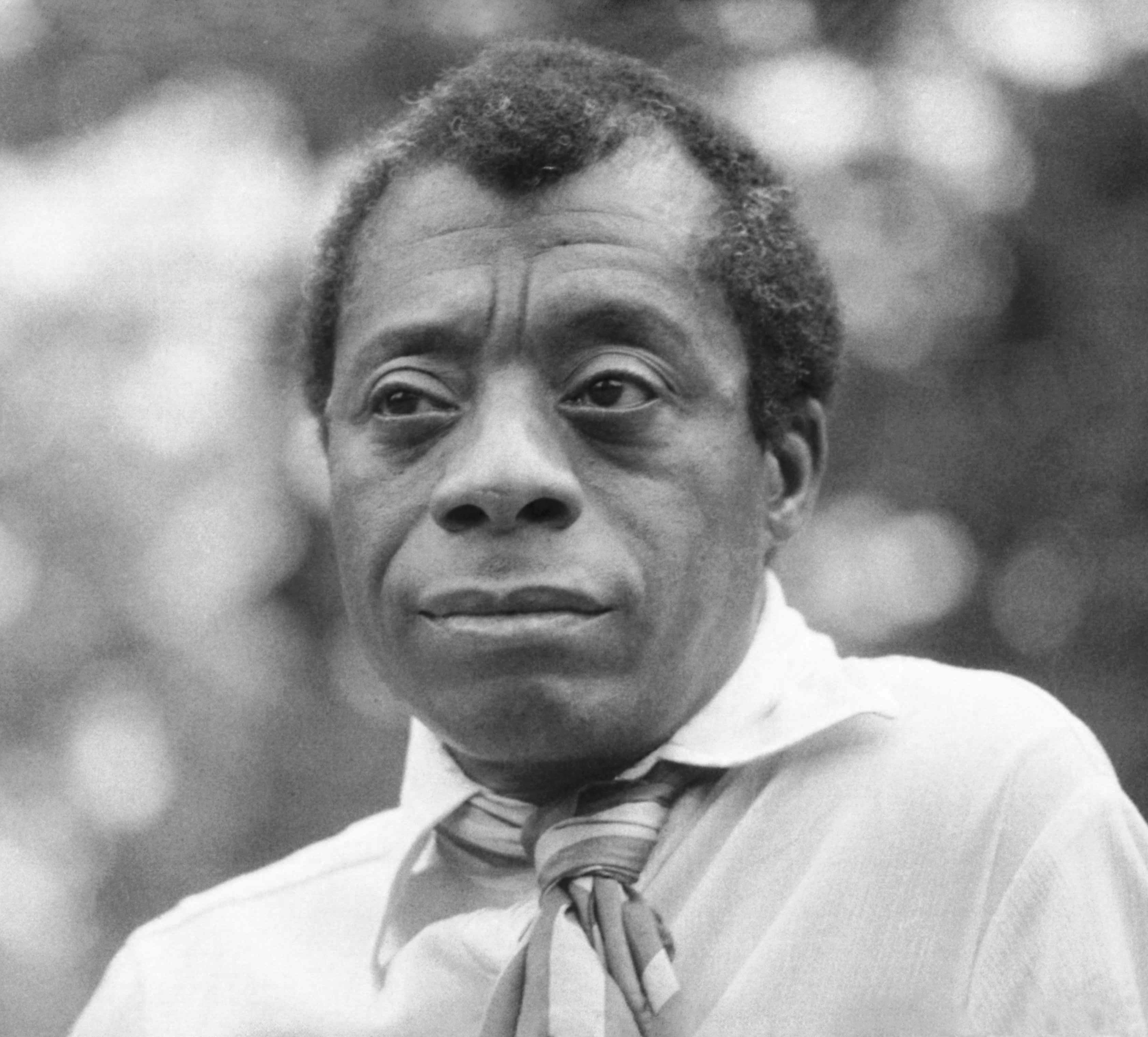
James Baldwin

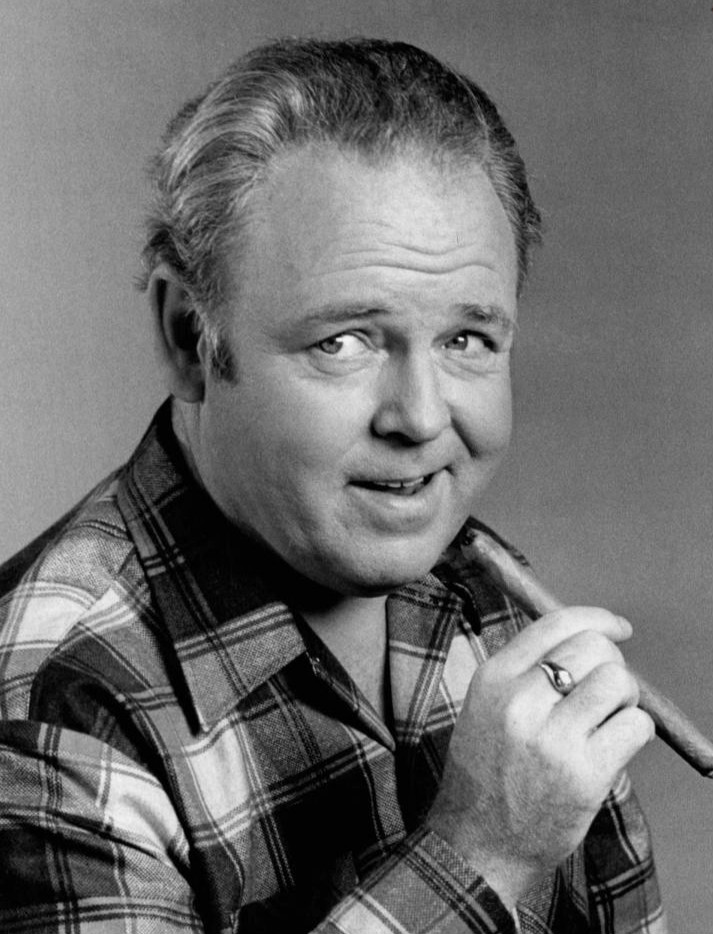
Carroll O'Connor

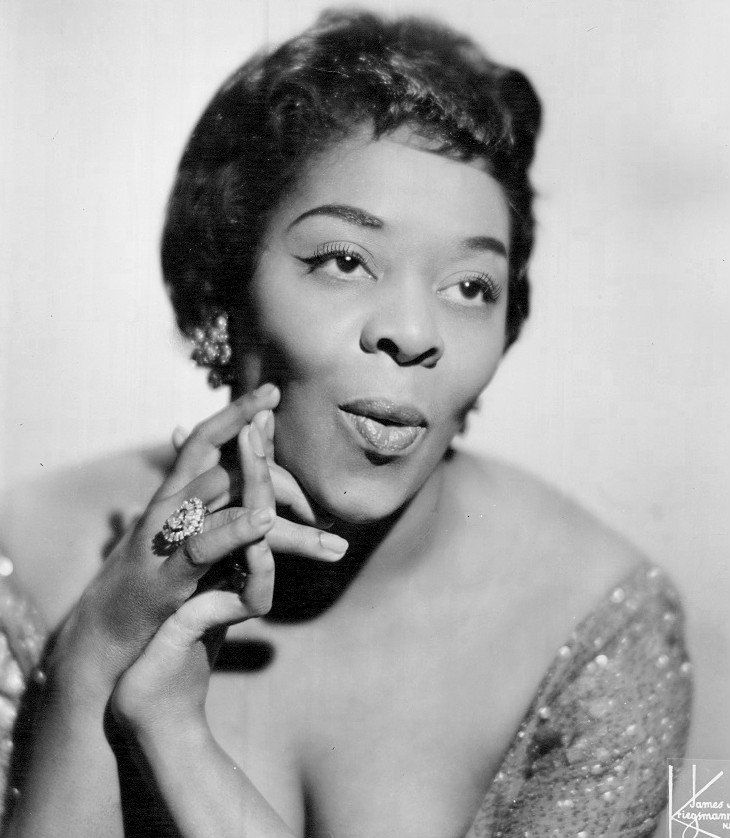
Dinah Washington

- August 1
  - Marcia Mae Jones, American actress (d. 2007)
  - Frank Havens, American canoeist (d. 2018)
  - Michael Stewart, American playwright, stage librettist (d. 1987)
- August 2
  - James Baldwin, African-American author and civil rights activist (d. 1987)
  - Joe Harnell, American pianist and composer (d. 2005)
  - Carroll O'Connor, American actor, producer and director (d. 2001)
- August 3 – Leon Uris, American writer (d. 2003)
- August 6 – Ella Jenkins, American folk singer of children's music (d. 2024)
- August 8 – Gene Deitch, American illustrator, animator and film director (d. 2020)
- August 9 – Marta Becket, American dancer (d. 2017)
- August 10 – Martha Hyer, American actress (d. 2014)
- August 15 – Phyllis Schlafly, American activist (d. 2016)
- August 16
  - Fess Parker, American actor and businessman (d. 2010)
  - Inez Voyce, American female baseball player (d. 2022)
  - Benny Bartlett, American child actor and musician (d. 1999)
- August 17
  - Evan S. Connell, Jr., American fiction writer and poet (d. 2013)
  - Charles Simmons, American author (d. 2017)
- August 18 – Frank Logue, 25th mayor of New Haven, Connecticut (d. 2010)
- August 20 – Frank Joseph Guarini, American politician (d. 2026)
- August 23
  - Elaine Sturtevant, American artist (d. 2014)
  - Robert Solow, American economist, Nobel Prize laureate (d. 2023)
- August 24 – Louis Teicher, American pianist (Ferrante & Teicher) (d. 2008)
- August 26 – Barbara Staff, American political activist (d. 2019)
- August 28 – Peggy Ryan, American dancer (d. 2004)
- August 29
  - Clyde Scott, American athlete (d. 2018)
  - Dinah Washington, African-American singer, pianist (d. 1963)
- August 31
  - Buddy Hackett, American actor, comedian (d. 2003)
  - Thomas J. Hudner Jr., American naval aviator (d. 2017)

=== September ===
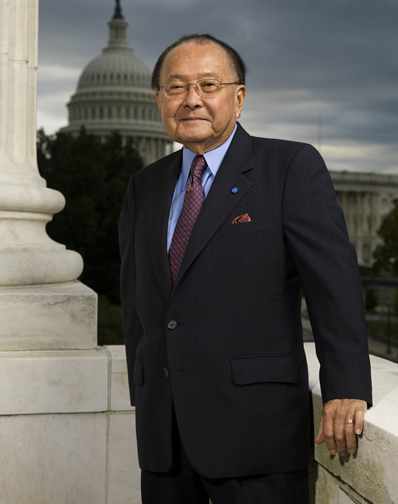
Daniel Inouye

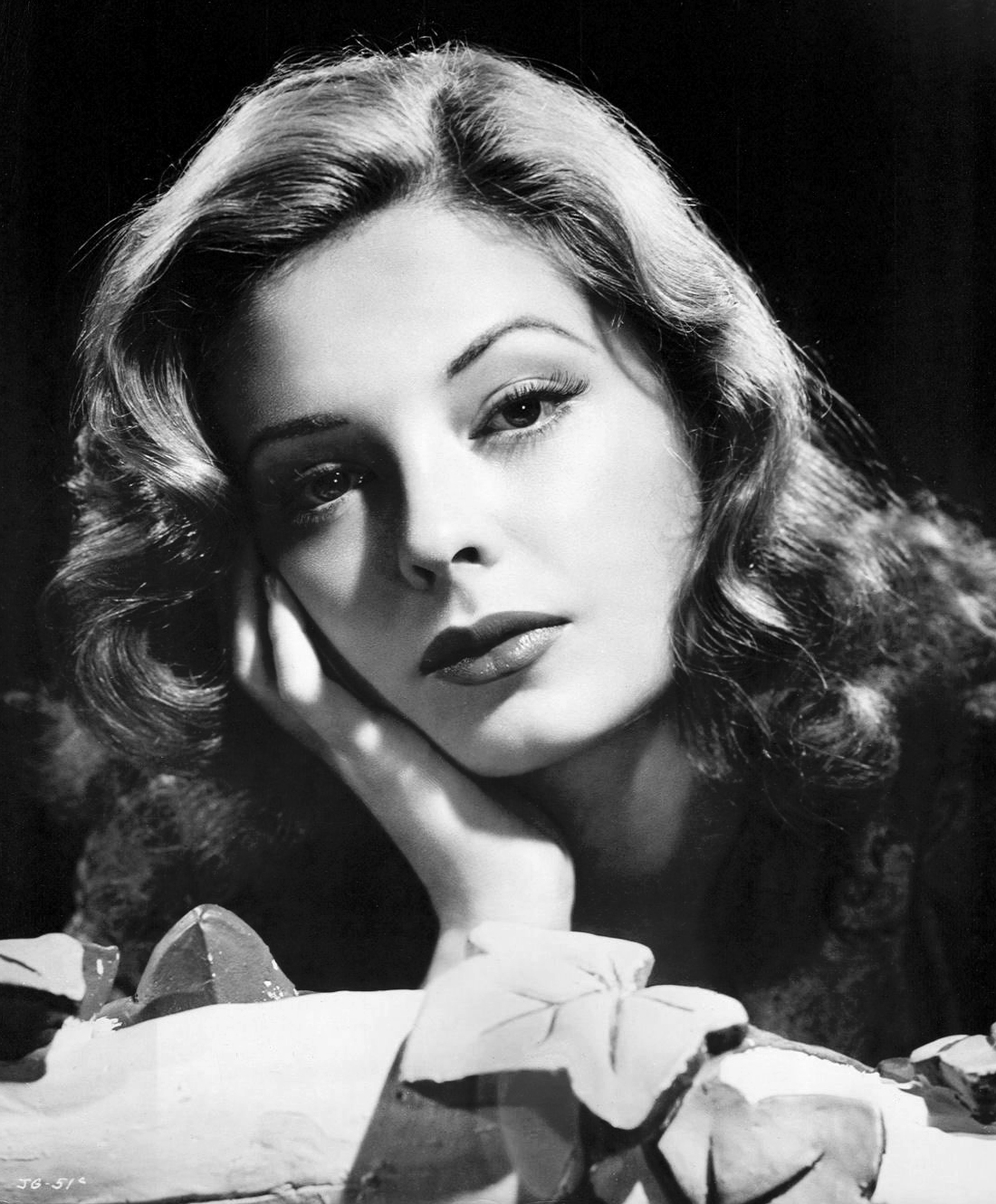
Jane Greer

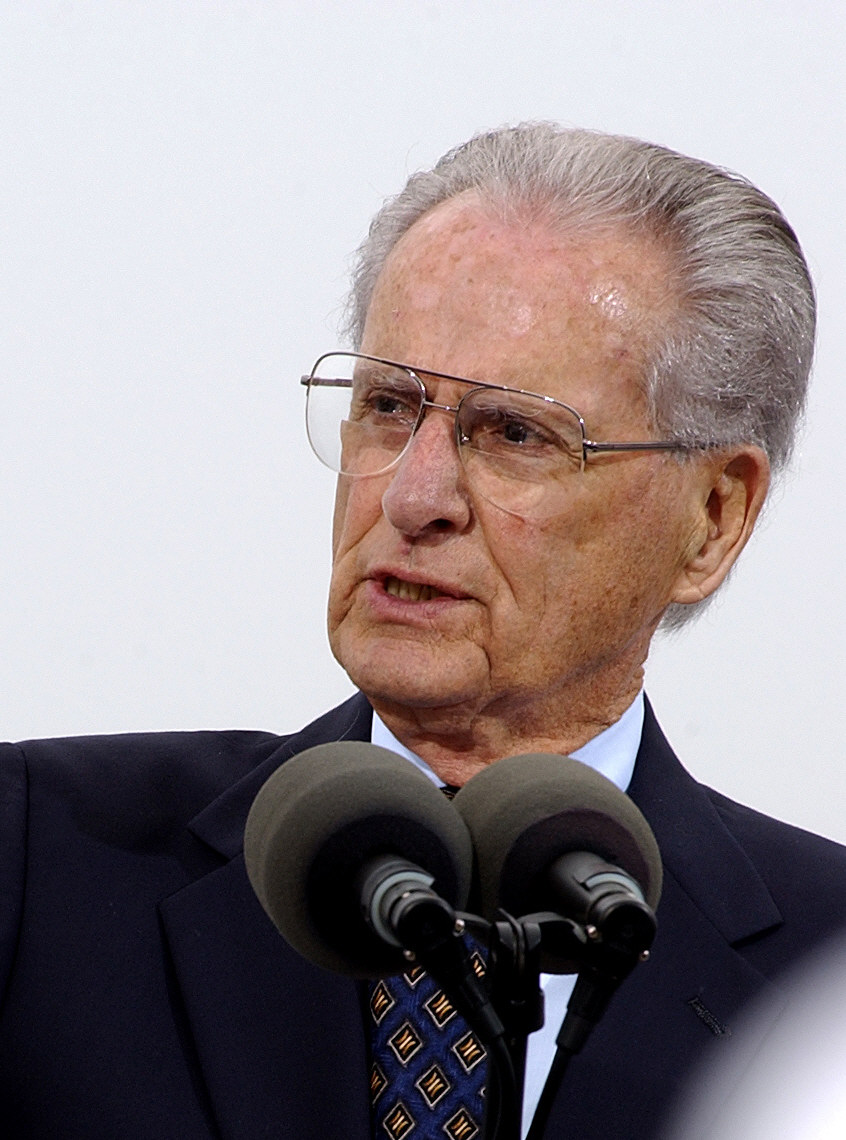
Jerry Coleman

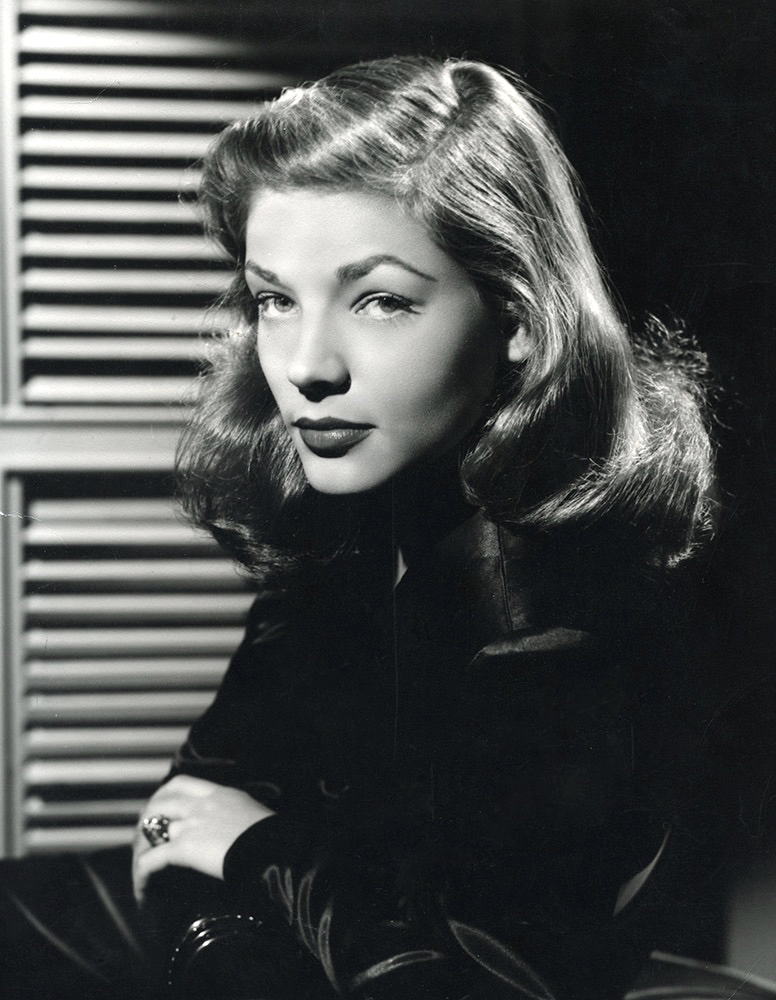
Lauren Bacall

- September 2 – Sidney Phillips, American physician, WW2 Marine documentary consultant (d. 2015)
- September 3 – Mary Grace Canfield, American actress (d. 2014)
- September 5
  - Paul Dietzel, American college football coach (d. 2013)
  - Roy Andrew Miller, American linguist (d. 2014)
- September 6
  - John Melcher, American politician (d. 2018)
  - Dale E. Wolf, American businessman and politician (d. 2021)
- September 7 – Daniel Inouye, American politician (d. 2012)
- September 8 – Wendell H. Ford, American politician (d. 2015)
- September 9
  - Jane Greer, actress (d. 2001)
  - Sylvia Miles, actress (d. 2019)
  - Russell M. Nelson, heart surgeon and religious leader (d. 2025)
- September 11
  - Daniel Akaka, soldier, engineer and politician (d. 2018)
  - Tom Landry, football player and coach (d. 2000)
- September 12 – Howard C. Nielson, politician (d. 2021)
- September 13 – Scott Brady, actor (d. 1985)
- September 14 – Jerry Coleman, baseball player, manager, broadcaster, and Marine aviator (d. 2014)
- September 15 – Bobby Short, entertainer (d. 2005)
- September 16 – Lauren Bacall, actress (d. 2014)
- September 20
  - Gogi Grant, singer (d. 2016)
  - Helen Grayco, singer, actress (d. 2022)
- September 22
  - J. William Middendorf, soldier and politician (d. 2025)
  - Gerald Schoenfeld, chairman (d. 2008)
- September 27
  - Wendell Bell, futurist (d. 2019)
  - Fred Singer, Austrian-American physicist and academic (d. 2020)
- September 28 – Merwin Coad, politician (d. 2025)
- September 30
  - Truman Capote, author (d. 1984)
  - Georgiana Young, actress (d. 2007)

=== October ===
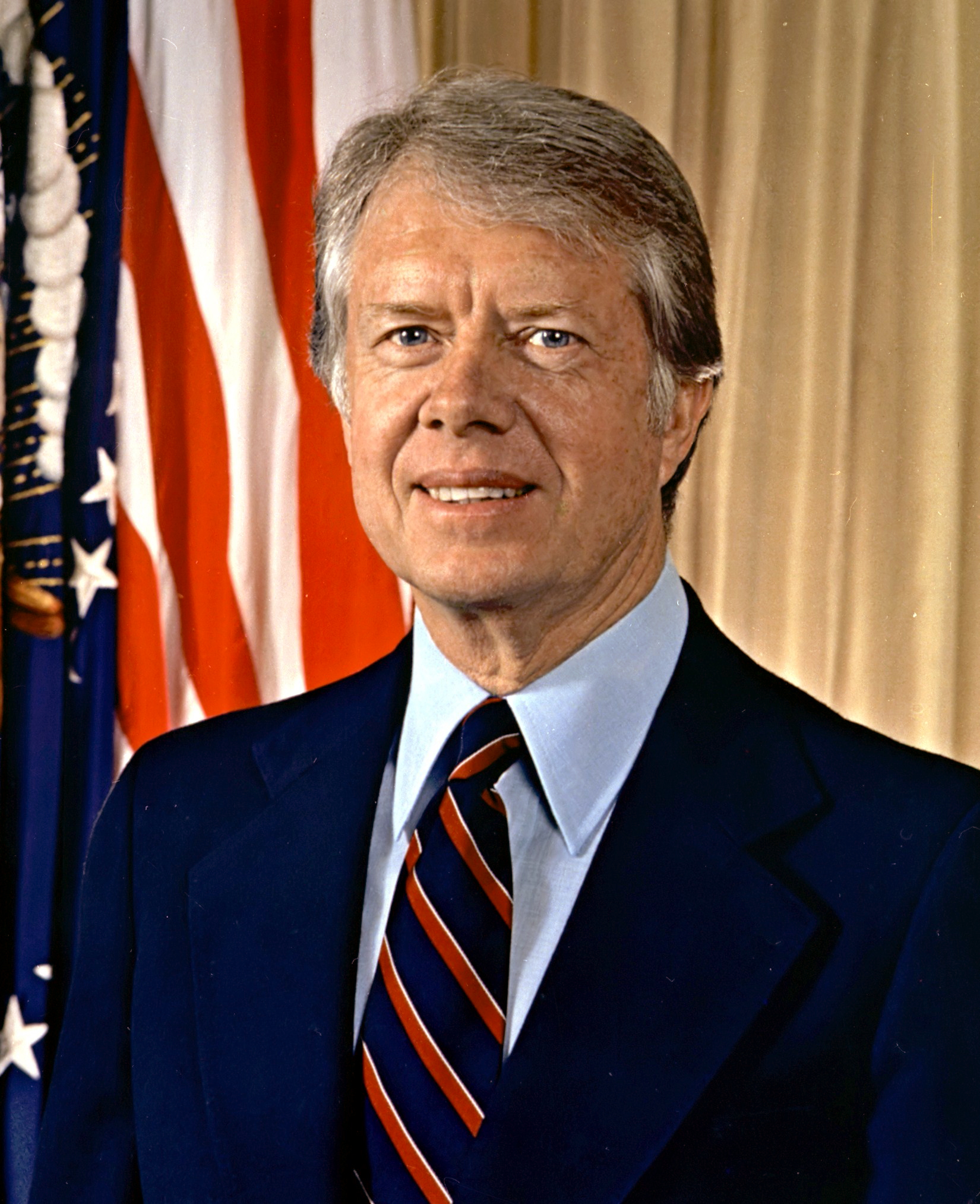
Jimmy Carter

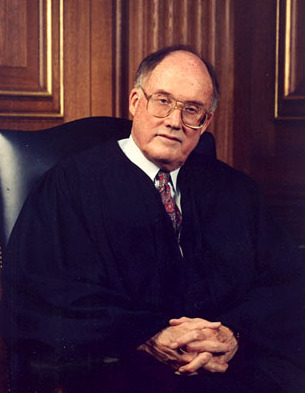
William Rehnquist

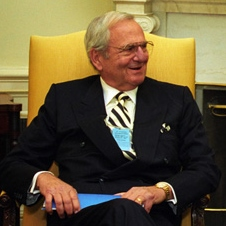
Lee Iacocca

- October 1
  - Jimmy Carter, 39th president of the United States from 1977 to 1981 (d. 2024)
  - William Rehnquist, 16th Chief Justice of the Supreme Court (d. 2005)
  - Roger Williams, American pianist (d. 2011)
- October 2 – Ruby Stephens, American female baseball player (d. 1996)
- October 3 – Harvey Kurtzman, American editor, cartoonist and creator of Mad (d. 1993)
- October 5 – Bill Dana, American comedian, actor, screenwriter (d. 2017)
- October 7 – Joyce Reynolds, American actress (d. 2019)
- October 9 – Arnie Risen, American basketball player (d. 2012)
- October 10
  - David Shepherd, American producer, director and actor (d. 2018)
  - Ed Wood, American filmmaker, actor, writer, producer and director (d. 1978)
- October 11 – Mal Whitfield, American Olympic athlete (d. 2015)
- October 13 – Terry Gibbs, American vibraphone player and bandleader
- October 14 – Robert Webber, American actor (d. 1989)
- October 15
  - Warren Miller, American ski and snowboarding filmmaker (d. 2018)
  - Lee Iacocca, American automobile executive (d. 2019)
  - Mark Lenard, American actor (d. 1996)
- October 17 – Fredd Wayne, American actor (d. 2018)
- October 18
  - Arthur J. Jackson, American military officer (d. 2017)
  - Buddy MacMaster, American artist (d. 2014)
- October 21 – Joyce Randolph, American actress (d. 2024)
- October 25
  - Billy Barty, American actor (d. 2000)
  - Bobby Brown, baseball player (b. 2021)
  - Earl Palmer, American R&B drummer (d. 2008)
  - Weston E. Vivian, American politician (d. 2020)
- October 27 – Bonnie Lou, American singer (d. 2015)

=== November ===
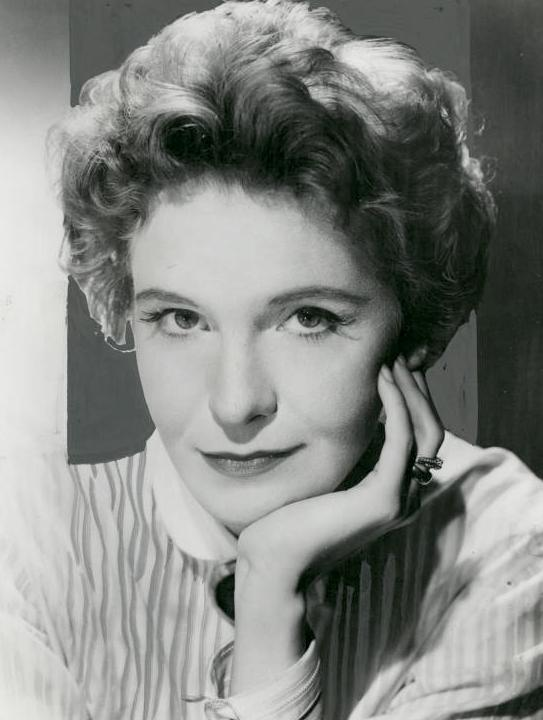
Geraldine Page

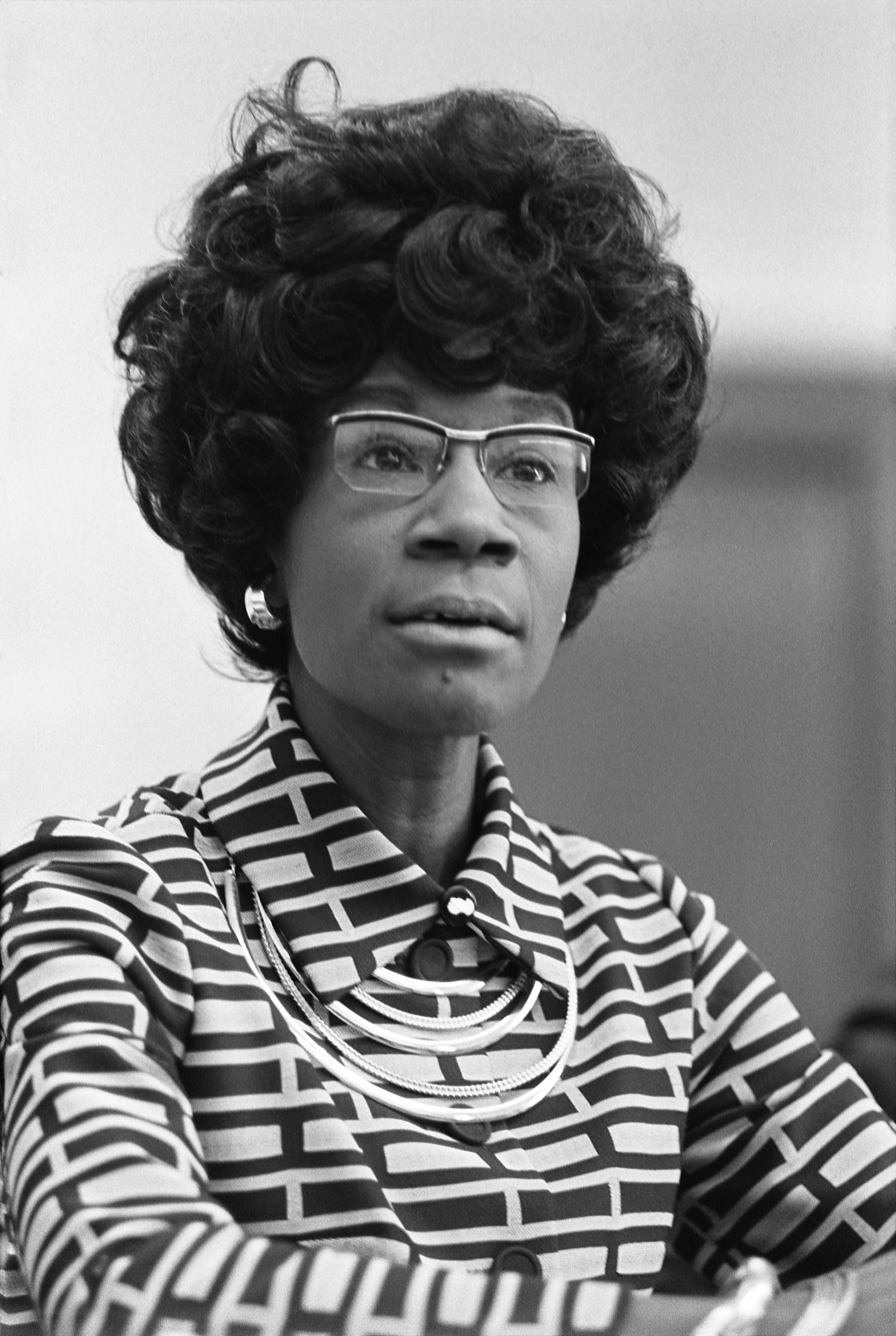
Shirley Chisholm

- November 6
  - Harlon Block, U.S. Marine flag raiser on Iwo Jima (d. 1945)
- November 10 – Russell Johnson, American actor (d. 2014)
- November 11 – Leonard D. Wexler, American judge (d. 2018)
- November 13 – Edward F. Welch, Jr., American admiral (d. 2008)
- November 16 – Sam Farber, American businessman, co-founder of OXO (d. 2013)
- November 19 – J. D. Sumner, American gospel singer (d. 1998)
- November 20 – Mark Miller, American actor (d. 2022)
- November 21 – Joseph Campanella, American actor (d. 2018)
- November 22
  - Geraldine Page, American actress (d. 1987)
  - Robert M. Young, American film director and producer (d. 2024)
- November 24
  - James M. Burns, American attorney and judge (d. 2001)
  - Joanne Winter, American female professional baseball pitcher, LPGA player (d. 1996)
- November 25 – Paul Desmond, American jazz alto saxophonist and composer (d. 1977)
- November 26 – Ruth Bradley Holmes, linguist (d. 2021)
- November 28 – Calvin J. Spann, African-American Tuskegee Airman, fighter pilot (d. 2015)
- November 29 – Irv Noren, American baseball and basketball player (d. 2019)
- November 30
  - Shirley Chisholm, American politician (d. 2005)
  - Allan Sherman, American comedy writer, television producer and song parodist (d. 1973)

=== December ===
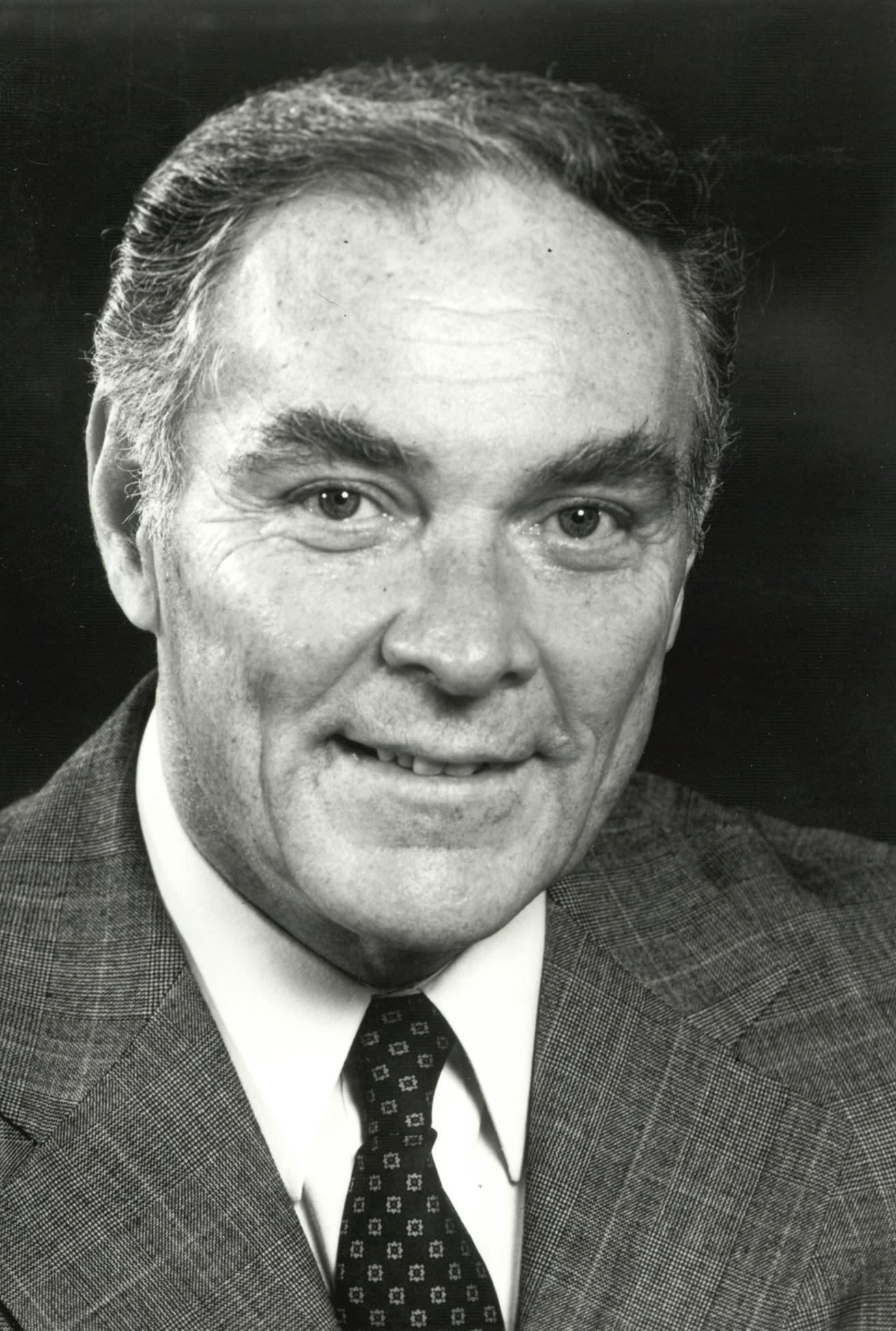
Alexander Haig

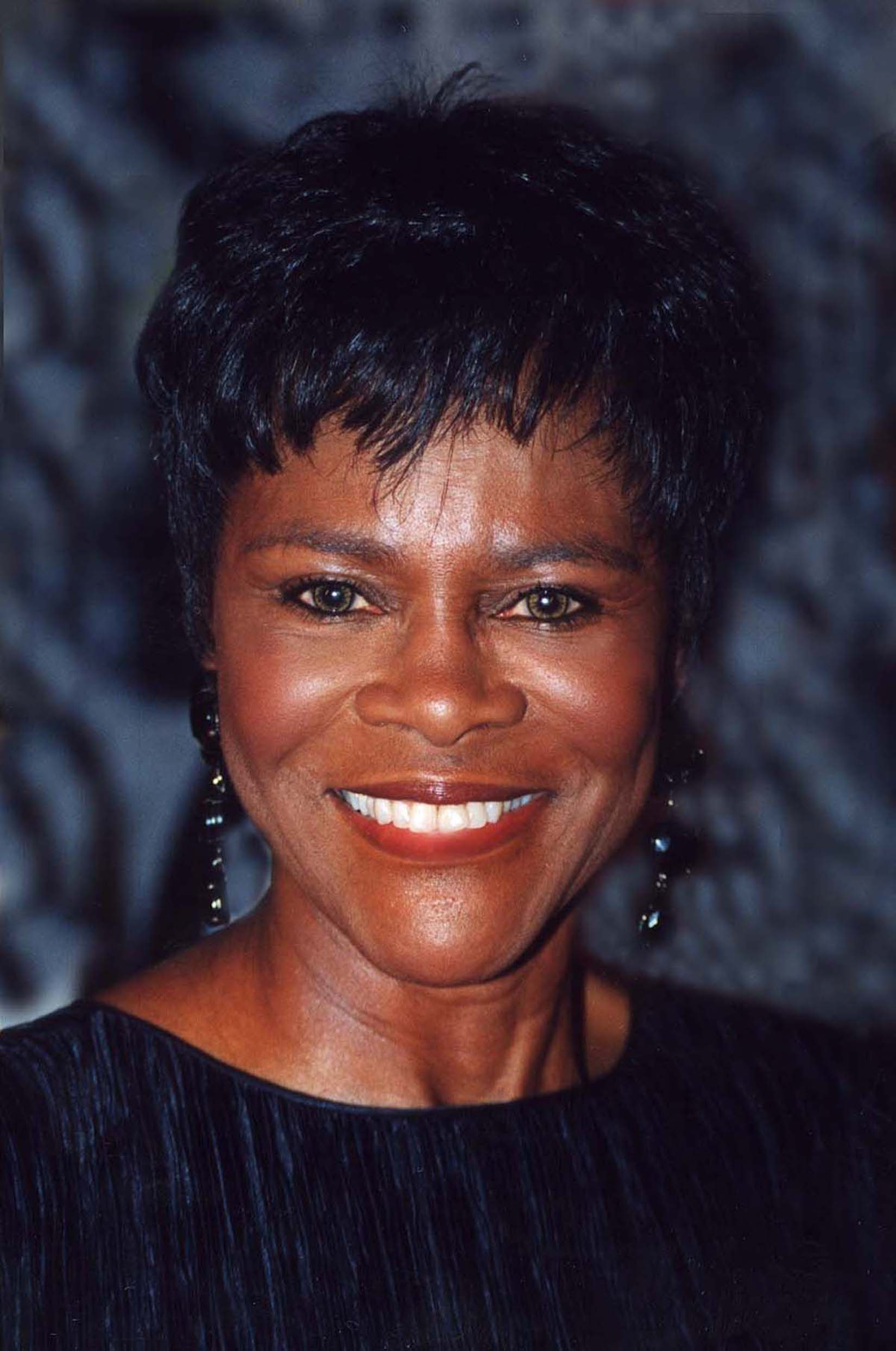
Cicely Tyson

- December 2 – Alexander Haig, American politician, U.S. Secretary of State (d. 2010)
- December 4 – John C. Portman Jr., American architect (d. 2017)
- December 6 – Wally Cox, American actor (d. 1973)
- December 9 – Frank Sturgis, one of the five Watergate burglars whose capture led to the end of the American Presidency of Richard Nixon (d. 1993)
- December 12 – Ed Koch, American politician (d. 2013)
- December 13
  - Robert Coogan, American actor (d. 1978)
  - Maria Riva, American actress (d. 2025)
- December 17 – Margaret Wigiser, American female professional baseball player (d. 2019)
- December 19 – Cicely Tyson, American actress (d. 2021)
- December 23 – Bob Kurland, American basketball player (d. 2013)
- December 25 – Rod Serling, American television screenwriter (The Twilight Zone) (d. 1975)
- December 26 – Frank Broyles, American college football coach, athletic director (d. 2017)
- December 27
  - James A. McClure, American politician (d. 2011)
  - Frank North, American football coach (d. 2017)
- December 29 – Dub Jones, American football player (d. 2024)
- December 31
  - Frank J. Kelley, 50th Michigan Attorney General (d. 2021)
  - Taylor Mead, American actor (d. 2013)
  - J. Donald Monan, American academic administrator (d. 2017)
  - Lawrence W. Pierce, American judge (d. 2020)
  - Robert Ravenstahl, American politician (d. 2015)

== Deaths ==
- January 4 – John Peters, baseball shortstop (born 1850)
- January 12 – William V. Allen, U.S. Senator from Nebraska from 1893 to 1899. (born 1847)
- January 13 – Albert Abrams, quack doctor (born 1863)
- January 14 – Luther Emmett Holt, pediatrician (born 1855)
- February 1 – Maurice Prendergast, painter (born 1858)
- February 3 – Woodrow Wilson, 28th president of the United States from 1913 to 1921 and historian (born 1856)
- February 8 – Henry B. Quinby, governor of New Hampshire (born 1846)
- February 16
  - Henry Bacon, Beaux-Arts architect of the Lincoln Memorial (born 1866)
  - John William Kendrick, railroad executive (born 1853)
- March 9 – Daniel Ridgway Knight, painter (born 1839)
- March 13 – Josephine St. Pierre Ruffin, African American civil rights campaigner and publisher (born 1842)
- April 1 – Frank Capone, gangster, shot by police (born 1895)
- April 7 – Marcus A. Smith, U.S. Senator from Arizona from 1912 to 1921 (born 1851)
- April 17 – Jane Kelley Adams, educator (born 1852)
- April 19 – Paul Boyton, extreme water sports pioneer (born 1848 in Ireland)
- April 14 – Louis Sullivan, architect, "father of skyscrapers" (born 1856)
- April 18 – Frank Xavier Leyendecker, illustrator (born 1877)
- April 20 – Caroline Ingalls (b. Caroline Lake Quiner), pioneer, mother of author Laura Ingalls Wilder (born 1839)
- April 21 – Eleonora Duse, Italian actress (born 1858 in Italy)
- April 23 – Bertram Goodhue, neo-gothic architect (born 1869)
- April 24 – G. Stanley Hall, psychologist (born 1844)
- April 27 – Maecenas Eason Benton, U.S. Representative from Missouri (born 1848)
- May 5 – Kate Claxton, stage actress (born 1848)
- May 10 – George Kennan, explorer (born 1845)
- May 11 – Moses Fleetwood Walker, baseball pitcher and Black nationalist (born 1856)
- May 13 – Alva Smith, Nebraska politician (born 1850)
- May 31 – Charles Stockton, admiral (born 1845)
- July 6 – Black Benny (Williams), bass drummer (born. c.1890)
- July 14 – Isabella Stewart Gardner, art collector and philanthropist (born 1840)
- July 23 – Frank Frost Abbott, classical scholar (born 1860)
- August 7 – John Edward Bruce ("Bruce Grit"), African American slave and historian (born 1856)
- August 25 – Velma Caldwell Melville, editor and writer (born 1858)
- September 1 – Samuel Baldwin Marks Young, general, first Chief of Staff of the United States Army (born 1840)
- September 15 – Frank Chance, baseball player (born 1877)
- September 17 – John Martin Schaeberle, German-born astronomer (born 1853 in Germany)
- September 25 – Lotta Crabtree, stage actress (born 1847)
- October 25 – Laura Jean Libbey, novelist (born 1862)
- October 27 – Percy Haughton, baseball player and coach (born 1876)
- October 29 – Frances Hodgson Burnett, children's novelist (born 1849 in the United Kingdom)
- November 3 – Cornelius Cole, U.S. Senator from California from 1867 to 1873 (born 1822)
- November 9 – Henry Cabot Lodge, U.S. Senator from Massachusetts from 1893 to 1924 (born 1850)
- November 10 – Dean O'Banion, gangster, killed (born 1892)
- November 19 – Thomas H. Ince, silent film producer, "father of the Western" (born 1882)
- November 21 – Florence Harding, née Kling, First Lady of the United States from 1921 to 1923 as wife of Warren G. Harding, 29th president (born 1860)
- December 6 – Gene Stratton-Porter, novelist and naturalist (born 1863)
- December 13 – Samuel Gompers, labor leader (born 1850)
- December 15
  - T. Frank Appleby, United States Congressman from New Jersey from 1921 to 1923. (born 1864)
  - William Herbert Carruth, linguist and poet (born 1859)
- December 19 – Stephen Warfield Gambrill, U.S. Congressman for Maryland's 5th District (born 1873)

== See also ==
- List of American films of 1924
- Timeline of United States history (1900–1929)
