= New Jersey Women's Hall of Fame =

Honorary organization established in 2011

Coordinates: 40.221545°N 74.762745°W

The New Jersey Women's Hall of Fame was established in 2011, by the YWCA of Trenton, in Trenton, New Jersey.

Inductions into the hall of fame occur at the Annual Induction Gala, which is held in the Spring. Each inductee receives the Gerber Daisy Award, created in 2011 by Boehm Porcelain, of Trenton, for the hall of fame. The inaugural class was inducted on March 31, 2011.

The YWCA of Trenton—sponsor of the hall—was founded in 1904, to empower women, eliminate racism, and promote peace, justice, freedom, and dignity for everyone.

== Inductees ==
New Jersey Women's Hall of Fame
Name	Image	Birth–Death	Year	Area of achievement	Ref(s)
Kim Guadagno		(b. 1959)	2011	Lt. Governor of the State of New Jersey	
Mary Jo Abbondanza		(b. 1946)	2011	Executive Director of Health Promotions at St. Francis Medical Center	
Edith Savage-Jennings		(1924–2017)	2011	Civil-rights and women's rights	
Meta Griffith		(1909–2010)	2011	Business woman, community activist	
Brenda Ross-Dulan		(b. 1960)	2011	Wells Fargo	
Christina Seix		(b. 1950)	2011	Investment counselor, founder of Christina Seix Academy prep school for underserved kids	
Elise Tretola		(b. 1966)	2011	Founded a non-profit organization to serve the needs of people with disabilities	
Lynne Azarchi		(b. 1963)	2012	Creator of Kidsbridge Tolerance Museum	
Mary Higgins Clark		(1927–2020)	2012	Novelist	
Carmen M. Garcia		(b. 1958)	2012	Former Chief Judge of Trenton Municipal Court; member of the New Jersey State Patrol Board	
Lillian Harrington		(b. 1934)	2012	Sister Harrington is a member of the Religious Teachers Filippini and president of Villa Victoria Academy	
Anne LaBate		(b. 1953)	2012	Community volunteerism; president of Segal LaBate Commercial Real Estate	
Alice Paul		(1885–1977)	2012	Women's Right Suffragist and author of the Equal Rights Amendment	
C. Vivian Stringer		(b. 1948)	2012	Head coach of the Rutgers Women’s Basketball Team	
Lisa P. Jackson		(b. 1962)	2013	Administrator of the U.S. EPA	
Amy B. Mansue		(b. 1964)	2013	President and CEO of Children's Specialized Hospital	
Becky Halstead		(b. 1959)	2013	Retired United States Army Brigadier general; first woman graduate of United States Military Academy to rise to the rank of general officer	
Eleanor V. Horne		(b. 1945)	2013	Second Vice Chair to NNSTOY (National State Teachers of the Year) Board of Directors; community activist and retired Vice President of Educational Testing Service	
June Ballinger		(b. 1949)	2013	Executive Artistic Director, Passage Theater Company	
Gloria Bonilla-Santiago		(b. 1954)	2013	Board of Governors Distinguished Service Professor Rutgers University	
Mary G. Roebling		(1905–1994)	2013	Chairwoman of National State Bank; first woman head of a national bank	
Beverly Richardson		(b. 1946)	2014	Vice President, Burlington County College	
Ivonne Diaz-Claisse		(b. 1967)	2014	President of HISPA (Hispanics Inspiring Students' Performance and Achievement)	
Mildred B. Gershen		(1927–2018)	2014	President and CEO of Moderate Income Management Company	
Hazel Gluck		(b. 1934)	2014	Partner, MBI GluckShaw	
Kim C. Hanemann		(b. 1963)	2014	Vice President of Delivery Projects & Construction, PSE&G	
Nina D. Melker		(b. 1961)	2014	Sr. Vice President of Hopewell Valley Community Bank	
Etta Rudolf Denk		(b. 1961)	2015	Senior VP Bank of America New Jersey	
Jennifer A. Downing		(b. 1972)	2015	Chief Assistant Prosecutor Mercer County Prosecutor's Office	
Caren S. Franzini		(1959–2017)	2015	Financial/economic advisor, former Chief Executive Officer of the New Jersey Economic Development Authority	
Patricia A. Hartpence		(b. 1956)	2015	Assistant Vice President for Corporate Giving NJM Insurance Group	
Virginia Long		(b. 1942)	2015	Legal counsel, retired justice of the Supreme Court of New Jersey	
Sheila Gallagher-Montone		(b. 1956)	2015	Retired Times of Trenton publisher	

== See also ==
- New Jersey Hall of Fame
- Sports Hall of Fame of New Jersey
