= Carmen M. Garcia =

Former Chief Judge of Trenton Municipal Court

Judge of the Trenton Municipal Court
- In office 1998–2004

Personal details
- Born: 1957 or 1958 (age 67–68)
- Education: St. Joseph's University (BS); Rutgers University (JD)

Carmen M. Garcia (born 1957/1958) is the former chief judge of Trenton Municipal Court. She was inducted into the New Jersey Women's Hall of Fame in 2012.

== Early life and education ==
Garcia grew up in Camden and Pennsauken Township, New Jersey. Garcia received a Bachelor of Science from Saint Joseph's University. She also received her Juris Doctor from Rutgers University School of Law in Camden.

== Career ==
Early in her career, Garcia worked as a law clerk to United States District Judge Joseph H. Rodriguez. Garcia served as Assistant Counsel to New Jersey Governor Thomas Kean from 1987 to 1988. She served as a Municipal Judge in Trenton, New Jersey, until 2004.

In 2004, Garcia was appointed to the New Jersey state parole board as an Associate Board Member. The next year she became one of two state parole board members assigned to review matters involving juvenile offenders. In 2008, Governor Jon Corzine nominated Garcia for reappointment to the New Jersey state parole board. The state senate confirmed Garcia's nomination giving her a six-year term.

=== Memberships and associations ===
As of 2013, Garcia served as Chief Diversity Officer of the New Jersey Women Lawyers Association. Garcia is also a Trustee to the Hispanic Bar Association of New Jersey and a member of the Capital Health Regional Hospital System Board of Directors.

=== Honors ===
Garcia was inducted into the New Jersey Women's Hall of Fame in 2012 and the Camden Catholic High School Hall of Fame in 2015.

== See also ==
- List of Hispanic and Latino American jurists
