= Alva Smith =

American politician

Alva Lorenzo Smith (5 January 1850, Grant County, Wisconsin – 13 May 1924, Omaha, Nebraska) was a member of the Nebraska State Senate from 1885 to 1886 as a member of the Republican Party.
