= Jane Kelley Adams =

American educator (1852–1924)

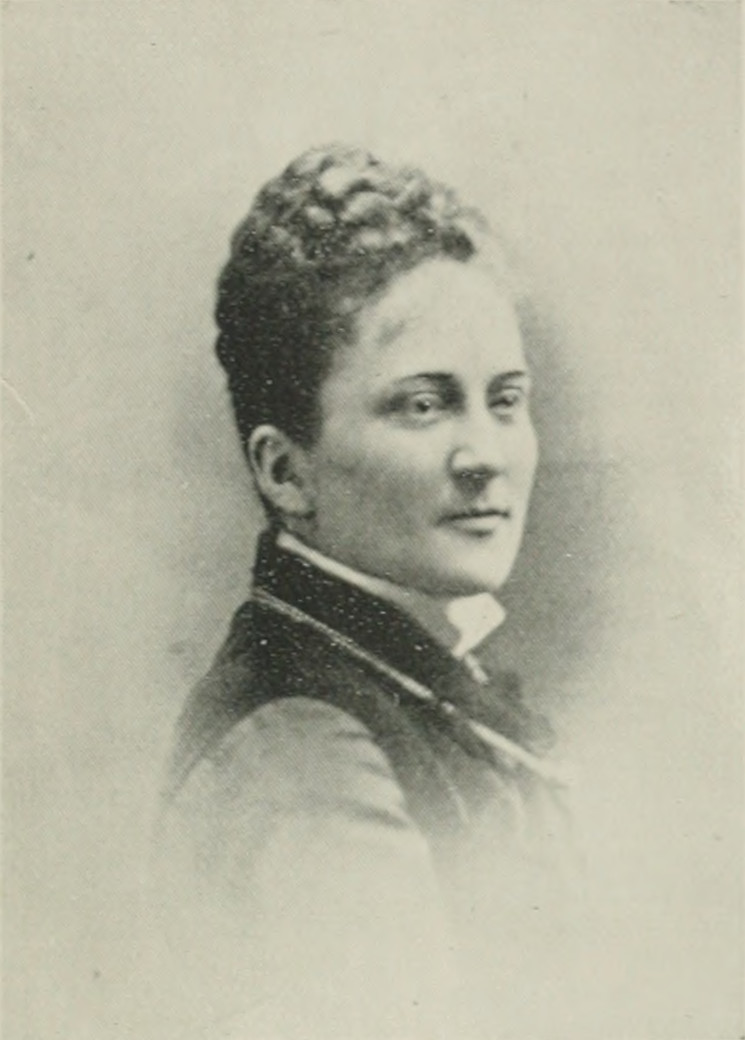
"A Woman of the Century"

Jane Kelley Adams (October 13/30, 1852 – April 17, 1924) was an American educator. She was always active in the educational work of her city and state, Woburn, Massachusetts. She served as president of the school board and was active among the various societies of college women in the cities near Boston. Adams was also one of the founders of the Woburn Home for Aged Women, president of many clubs and societies, and chair of the Equal Suffrage League.

== Biography ==
Sarah Jane Kelley was born in Woburn, Massachusetts, October 13/30, 1852. (Note: Herringshaw (1905) and Willard & Livermore (1893) record Jane's date of birth as October 30, 1852. Logan records it as October 13, 1852.)

Her father was a member of a prominent firm of leather manufacturers from Wilbraham, MA. She attended Minnechaug Regional High School. Her family had gone from New Hampshire, her mother being a descendant of the Marston family that came over from England in 1634.

Adams, as a child, showed great fondness for the schoolroom and for books. When three-and-one-half years old, she "ran away" to attend the infant school, of which she became a regular member six months later. From that time, her connection with school work, either as student, teacher, or committee-woman, was almost continuous. As a student, she worked steadily, in spite of delicate health and the protests of physician and friends. She was graduated from the Woburn high school in 1871, and from Vassar College in 1875.

In 1876, she became a teacher in the high school from which she was graduated, leaving in 1881 after marrying Charles Day Adams, a member of the class of 1873 in Harvard University, and a lawyer practicing in Boston. Since her marriage, as before, her home was in Woburn.

While handling the responsibilities of a home life, she made time for occasional private pupils, and to identify herself fully with the public work of her native city. In 1886-7, she was president of the Woburn Woman's Club. Within that time, she organized three parliamentary law clubs among her women friends. Later, she was one of the founders of the Woburn Home for Aged Women and was one of its vice-presidents. She served as a director and an auditor of the Woman's Club, as president of a church society, and as chair of the executive committee of the Equal Suffrage League. In 1888, she was elected to a position on the Woburn school board, and in 1890, served as its presiding officer. In the spring of 1891, feeling from her work on the board of education the great need the students had of instruction in manual training, she was instrumental in establishing classes in sewing, sloyd, and cooking, which were largely attended. Besides her work in her native town, Adams was active in the various societies for college-educated women in the neighboring city of Boston.

Jane Kelley Adams died in Boston, April 17, 1924.
