= Wendell Bell =

American sociologist and futurist (1924–2019)

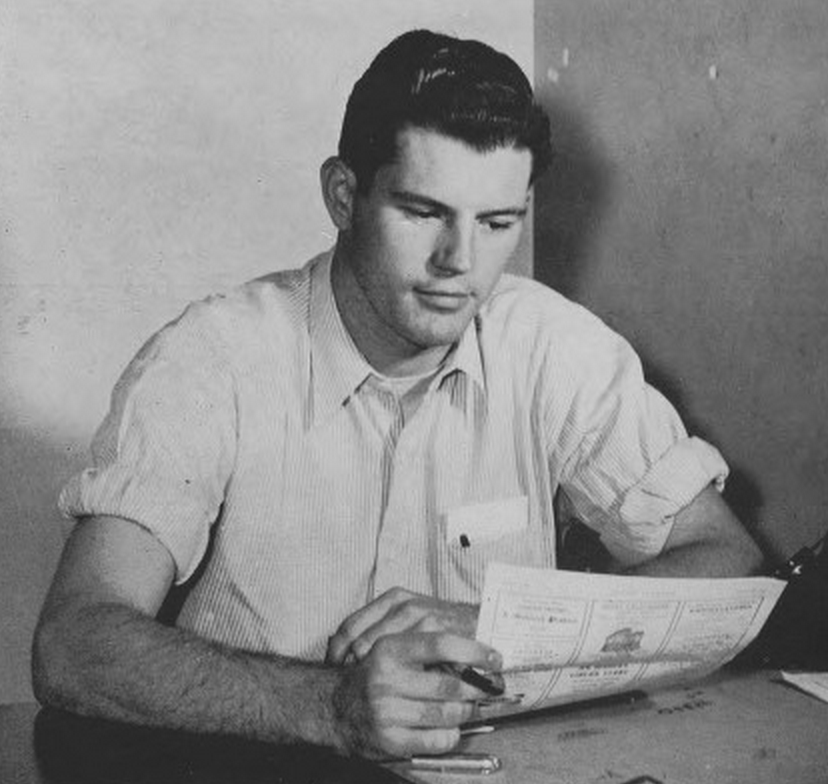
- Bell circa 1948 at Fresno State University
- Born: September 27, 1924
- Died: November 3, 2019 (aged 95)
- Occupations: Futurist, Professor Emeritus of Sociology
- Awards: Lifetime Achievement Award (World Futures Studies Federation, 2005)

Academic background
- Education: California State University, Fresno, UCLA

Academic work
- Discipline: Sociology, Futures Studies
- Institutions: Yale University, Stanford University, Northwestern University, UCLA
- Notable works: The Foundations of Futures Studies

Wendell Bell (September 27, 1924 – November 3, 2019) was a futurist and Professor Emeritus of Sociology at Yale University. His areas of specialization included sociology, social class, race, family life and future studies.

== Early career ==
During World War II, Bell was a naval aviator and served in the Philippines.

Bell graduated in Social Sciences from California State University, Fresno in 1948. He then attained his Ph.D. from UCLA in 1952 and served on the faculties of Stanford University (1952–4; directed Stanford Survey Research Facility), Northwestern University (1954–57), and UCLA (1957–63; headed West Indies Study Program). From 1963 to 1964, he was a Fellow at the Center for Advanced Study in the Behavioral Sciences at Stanford, California.

== Yale career ==
Joining the Yale faculty in 1963, Bell went on to become chairman of the Yale Department of Sociology and helped found the Yale Program of African American Studies. He retired from Yale in 1995.

== Research interests ==
While Bell's early research interests focused on the sociology of US cities, and some later research interests focused on the sociology of Caribbean countries (Bell served as president of the Caribbean Studies Association from 1979 to 1980), Bell is primarily known for his research and other works as a futurist.

== Futurist career ==
Bell worked as a professional futurist for over 40 years. The World Futures Studies Federation awarded him a Lifetime Achievement Award in 2005. In 2008, the Association of Professional Futurists selected Bell's two-volume work The Foundations of Futures Studies as one of the ten most important futures studies books.
