= Richard Longaker =

American political scientist (1924–2018)

Richard Pancoast Longaker (July 1, 1924 – September 22, 2018) was an American political scientist, who was a professor at UCLA and a university administrator at Johns Hopkins University.

Longaker was born in Philadelphia in 1924. He attended Amherst College in 1942, before serving in the U.S. military during World War II from 1943 to 1945. Longaker completed a Bachelor of Arts degree at Swarthmore College in 1949, and a Master of Arts degree in American history at the University of Wisconsin in 1950, where his thesis discussed Anti-Catholicism in the United States, 1919-1929. Longaker completed a PhD in political science in 1953 at Cornell University, where he was a student of presidential scholar Clinton Rossiter. His doctoral thesis examined President Andrew Jackson and the judiciary.

Longaker was a professor at UC Riverside in 1954-55, and at Kenyon College in 1953-54 and 1955-60. He was hired as an associate professor of political science at UCLA in 1961, and taught courses on the U.S. Presidency and on Public Law. He served as chairman of the Department of Political Science at UCLA from 1963 to 1967.

Longaker left UCLA to join Johns Hopkins University in 1976, where he served as provost and vice president of academic affairs until 1986. In this role, he helped to found the Center for Talented Youth in 1979 and the Johns Hopkins School of Nursing in 1983.

He died in September 2018 at the age of 94.

== Works ==
Longaker's published works include:

- Andrew Jackson and the Judiciary (1955)
- The President as International Leader (1956)
- The Presidency and Individual Liberties (1961)
- Moulding a Republic: The Federalist Papers (1965)
- Contemporary Communism: Theory and Practice (1965), with Howard Swearer
- American Constitutional Government (1967)
- Conflict, Politics, and Freedom (1968), with Charles Quigley
- The Politics of Neglect: The Environmental Crisis (1971) (editor)
- High School Law Program: Attorney's Source Book (1973)
