= Barbara Staff =

American political activist (1924–2019)

Barbara Ruth Wright Staff
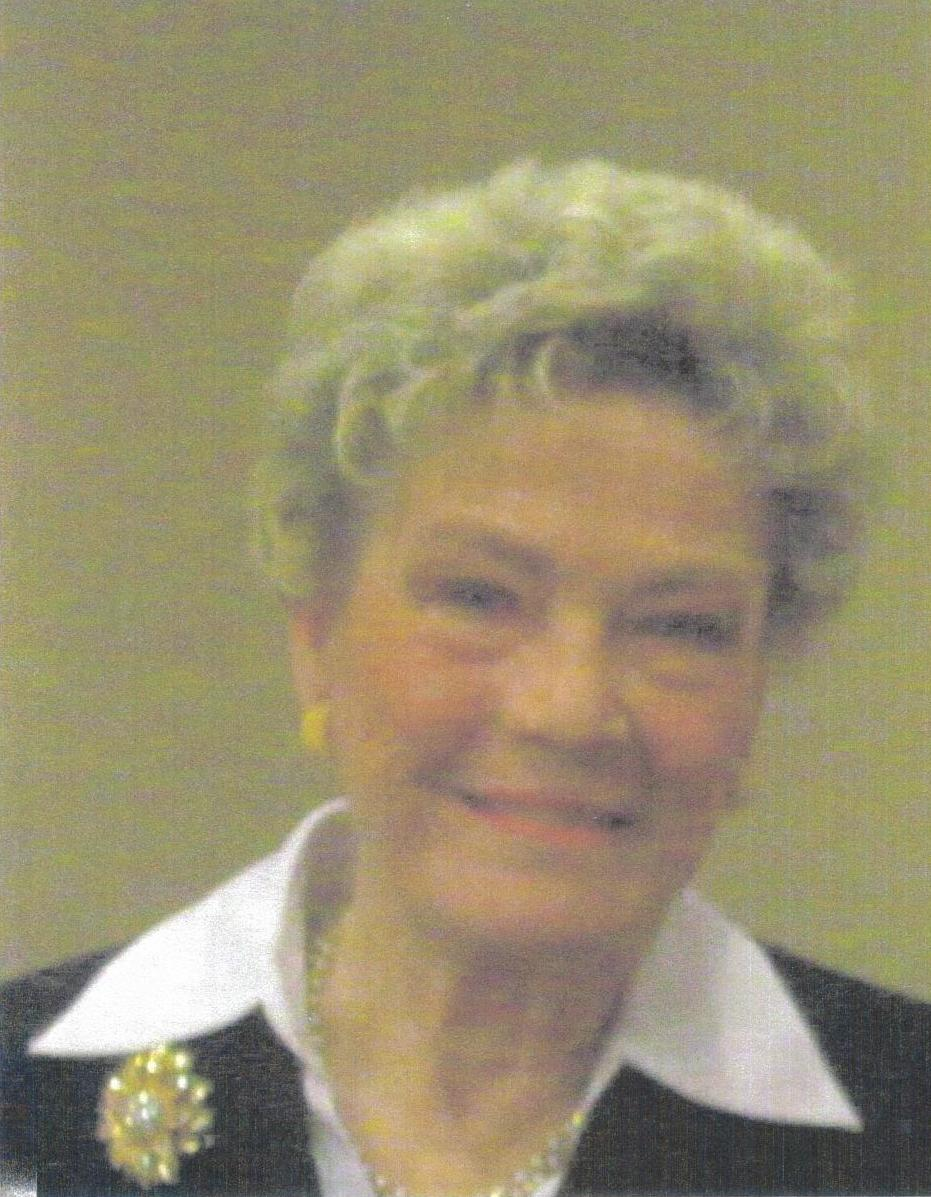
- Staff (2010)
- Born: Barbara Ruth Wright; August 26, 1924; Cleburne, Johnson County; Texas, USA
- Died: July 29, 2019 (aged 94)
- Education: Crozier Technical High School North Texas State University Southern Methodist University
- Occupations: Political activist Ronald W. Reagan Texas co-chairman, 1976
- Political party: Republican
- Spouse: William Stewart Staff (deceased)
- Children: Susan S. Causey; Barbara Ellen Kimberly (deceased)

Barbara Ruth Staff (August 26, 1924 – July 29, 2019) was an American political activist for the Republican Party who was one of three co-chairs of the 1976 presidential primary campaign for Ronald Reagan in Texas, along with Ernest Angelo Jr., former mayor of Midland, and Ray Barnhart, a former state legislator and a Republican chairman.

Staff died in July 2019 in Plano, Texas at the age of 94.
