= Edith Savage-Jennings =

American civil rights leader (1924–2017)

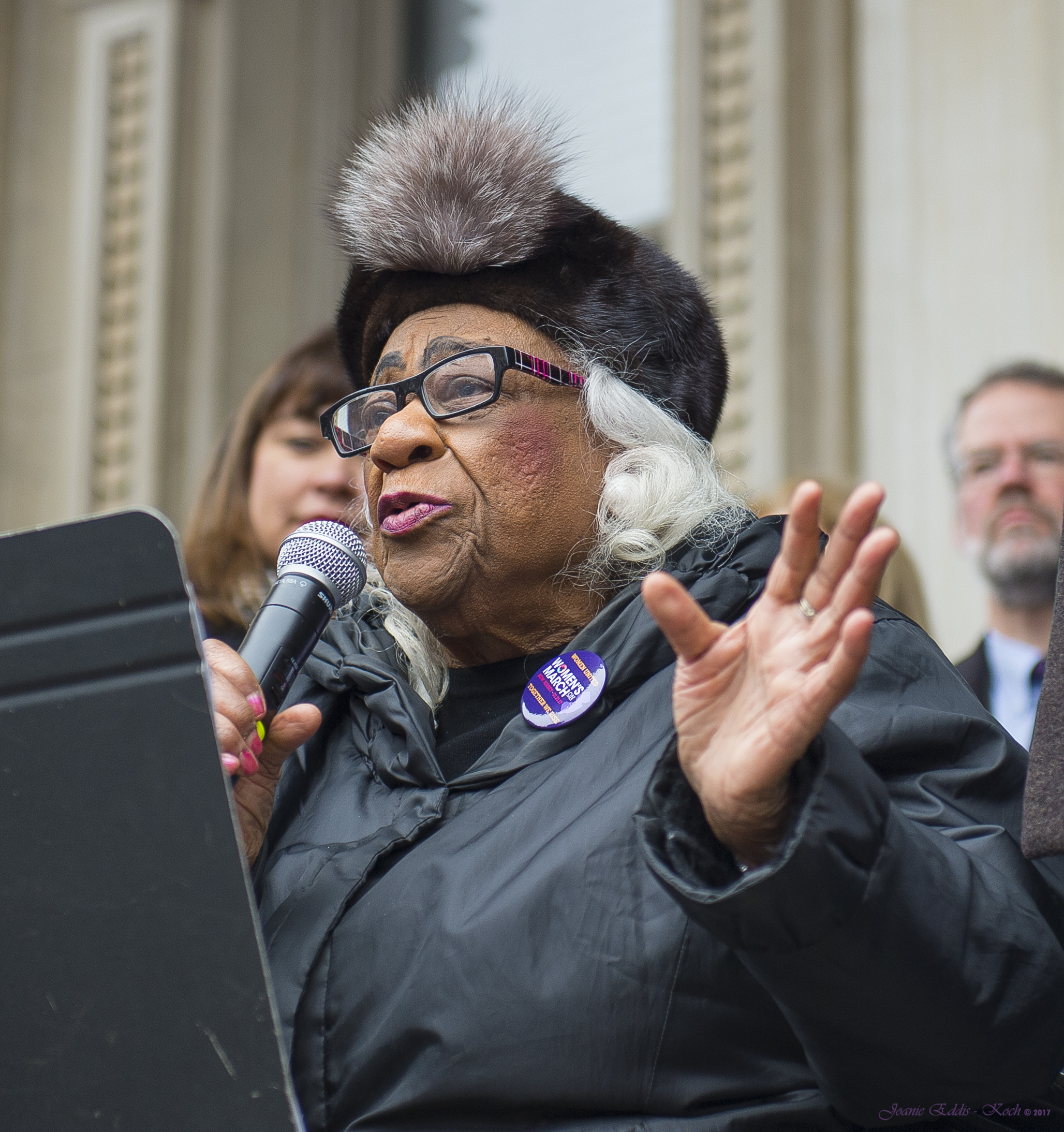
- Edith Savage-Jennings speaking in the 2017 Women's March in Trenton, New Jersey
- Born: Edith Mae Savage; March 17, 1924; Jacksonville, Florida, U.S.
- Died: November 12, 2017 (aged 93); Trenton, New Jersey, U.S.
- Known for: Activist
- Spouse: C. Donald Jennings (1993-2011; his death)

Edith Mae Savage-Jennings (March 17, 1924 – November 12, 2017) was an American civil rights leader from New Jersey. She was known for her association with civil rights leader Martin Luther King Jr.

She was notable for being a guest to the White House under every president of the United States from Franklin D. Roosevelt through Barack Obama. She was inducted into the New Jersey Women's Hall of Fame in 2011.

== Early life ==
Savage was born in 1924 at Jacksonville, Florida, one of six children in her family. Her parents died when she was two years old. Following the death of her parents, Savage and her siblings went to live with her aunt, who moved the family to New Jersey.

At age 10, Savage met First Lady Eleanor Roosevelt when she was selected to hand the First Lady flowers on behalf of the New Jersey State Federation of Colored Women's Clubs. Although told not to say anything, Savage thanked Roosevelt which led to the two becoming pen pals for the remainder of Roosevelt's life.

At 12 years old, she joined the National Association for the Advancement of Colored People (NAACP).

== Civil rights leader ==
At only 13 years old, Savage helped to integrate the Capital Theater in Trenton, New Jersey, when she refused to sit in the balcony, which was the designated seating area for blacks. Savage's first job was in the sheriff's office, where she continued to speak out against discrimination.

In 1957, while Savage was raising funds for King's Southern Leadership Conference, she was introduced to civil rights leader Martin Luther King Jr. King and his wife, Coretta Scott King, became Savage's close friends. After Martin's death, Savage worked with Coretta to found the King Center.

In 1964, Savage and then first lady of New Jersey Helen Meyner went on a presidential mission to integrate a school in Mississippi. Savage and Meyner met with local women in an effort to convince the locals to allow for the school to be integrated peacefully. Later that same year, she organized the New Jersey Democratic Coalition.

In 2017, she was a keynote speaker at the Women's March in Trenton.

== Other activities ==
Savage was the coordinator of the Mid-Atlantic States Poor People's Campaign of SCLC in 1968. President Jimmy Carter appointed her as a U.S. Delegate at the World Women’s Conference in Houston, Texas, in 1977.

Besides promoting civil rights, Savage wanted to combat problems in the African-American community through education. She believed the importance of parenting and mentoring to give children role models.

== Personal life ==
On October 28, 1993, Savage married C. Donald Jennings. Rosa Parks attended the wedding and Coretta Scott King served as maid of honor. Her husband died on June 19, 2011, at age 94.

== Death ==
Savage died on November 12, 2017, at her home in Trenton, New Jersey, at the age of 93.

== Awards and honors ==
Savage received more than 100 awards and honors for her work in Civil Rights. She was inducted into the New Jersey Women's Hall of Fame in 2011. The city of Trenton proclaimed February 19, 2016, as Edith Savage-Jennings Day.

Savage was a guest to the White House under every president of the United States from Franklin Delano Roosevelt through Barack Obama.
