= 1 Buck =

- Film poster
- Directed by: Fabien Dufils
- Written by: Fabien Dufils
- Produced by: Matt Allen; Mitch Dickman; Michael Haskins
- Cinematography: Stéphane Vallée
- Edited by: Olivier Wicki
- Music by: David Imbault
- Production company: Mad Street Motion Pictures
- Distributed by: Gravitas Ventures
- Release dates: January 10, 2017 (Calcutta International Cult Film Festival); September 22, 2017 (U.S.)
- Running time: 89 minutes
- Country: United States
- Language: English

1 Buck is a 2017 American thriller film directed by Fabien Dufils. It is Defils feature directorial debut.

== Cast ==
- John Freeman as Harry Maggio
- Cassi Colvin as Sonia
- Katie Lynne Ryan as Amara
- Darren Kendrick as Jay
- Will Green as Jordan
- River Faught as Bill
- Peter Tahoe as Rex
- Charlotte Bjornbak as Maria
- Melissa Schumacher as Samantha
- Tony Sallemi as Christian
- Kassandra Mahea as Cassie
- Raylee Magill as Janet
- Peggy Fields Richardson as Kate Pinkle
- Robin Zamora as Thomas

== Release ==
The film was released to Video on Demand on 21 September 2017.

== Reception ==
Elizabeth Kerr of The Hollywood Reporter wrote, "It's not quite as clever as it thinks it is, or as original, but it does manage a strong sense of morbid curiosity as to how events will shake out."

Gary Goldstein of the Los Angeles Times wrote that "Dufils vividly captures the locale's seedy, swampy vibe, with its dive bars, shabby homes, ubiquitous convenience stores and underground fight spots. If only there were a more compelling, engaging narrative to match."
