= Archview Investment Group LP =

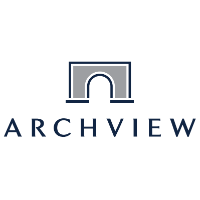
- Company type: Limited Partnership
- Industry: Investment management
- Founded: 2009
- Headquarters: 750 Washington Blvd, Stamford, Connecticut
- Area served: Worldwide
- Key people: Jeffrey Jacob (Founding Principal); John Humphrey (Founding Principal)
- Number of employees: 11-50
- Website: http://www.archviewlp.com/

Archview Investment Group LP was an institutional alternative investment firm based out of Stamford, Connecticut. The firm was founded in 2009 by Founding Principals Jeffrey Jacob and John Humphrey.

== History ==
Archview was founded in 2009 by Jeffrey Jacob and John Humphrey. Upon the firm's inception, Archview focused chiefly on corporate credit and distressed corporate assets. Jacob and Humphrey brought several of their colleagues from Citigroup to join them at Archview, calling it a “spin-off” more than a “start-up.”

Archview was part of a group of creditors to offer a $1 billion loan to Puerto Rico in 2017, during the aftermath of Hurricane Maria. The loan was rejected by the Puerto Rican fiscal agency for unfavorable conditions.

In December 2017, Bloomberg News reported that the firm was shutting down and would begin returning money to investors the following year.

== Management ==
Jeffrey Jacob and John Humphrey are Founding Principals and Co-Chief of Investment Officers of Archview Investment Group. Prior to founding Archview, both Jacob and Humphrey worked at Citigroup and Merrill Lynch & Co.
