= 1998 United States gubernatorial elections =

- November 3, 1998

38 governorships 36 states; 2 territories
	Majority party	Minority party
Party	Republican	Democratic
Seats before	32	17
Seats after	31	17
Seat change	▼1	Steady
Popular vote	29,585,254	25,245,493
Percentage	51.06%	43.57%
Seats up	24	11
Seats won	23	11
	Third party	Fourth party
Party	Reform	Independent
Seats before	0	1
Seats after	1	1
Seat change	▲1	Steady
Popular vote	1,640,051	472,794
Percentage	2.83%	0.82%
Seats up	0	1
Seats won	1	1
- Map of the results Democratic gain Republican gain Democratic hold Republican hold Reform gain Independent hold No election

United States gubernatorial elections were held on November 3, 1998, in 36 states and two territories. Going into the election cycle, 24 of the seats were held by Republicans, 11 by Democrats, and one by an independent. The elections changed the national balance of power by the loss of one Republican and the gain of one Independent, although political party dominance was shifted in nine states. Democrats gained open seats in California and Iowa and defeated incumbents Fob James of Alabama and David Beasley of South Carolina, while Republicans won open seats in Colorado, Florida, Nebraska, and Nevada and the Reform Party won an open Republican governorship in Minnesota. By the end of the election, 23 seats were held by Republicans, 11 by Democrats, one by the Reform Party, and one by an independent.

The elections coincided with the midterm elections for the United States Senate and the United States House of Representatives. With the exception of two states (New Hampshire and Vermont), the governors elected in this election served four-year terms. New Hampshire and Vermont's governors would serve two-year terms.

As of 2026, this election marked the most recent cycle in which Alabama and South Carolina elected Democrats to their respective governorships. This is also the last time that someone other than a Democrat or a Republican was elected governor in Maine and Minnesota. This would be the last time a non-independent third-party candidate would be elected governor of any state, as well as the last time an independent would be elected governor of a state until the 2010 election in Rhode Island. This was the last midterm election until 2022 in which the political party not holding the White House suffered net losses of governorships.

== Election results ==
=== States ===
State	Incumbent	Party	First elected	Result	Candidates
Alabama	Fob James	Republican	1978 (Note: James served as a Democrat for his first term. He had returned to the Republican Party by the time he was elected governor again in 1994.); 1982 (retired); 1994	Incumbent lost re-election. Democratic gain.	✓ Don Siegelman (Democratic) 57.9%; Fob James (Republican) 42.1%
Alaska	Tony Knowles	Democratic	1994	Incumbent re-elected.	✓ Tony Knowles (Democratic) 51.3%; Robin L. Taylor (Write-in) 18.3%; John Howard Lindauer (Republican) 17.9%; Ray Metcalfe (Republican Moderate) 6.1%; Desa Jacobsson (Green) 3.0%; Sylvia Sullivan (AK Independence) 1.9%
Arizona	Jane Dee Hull	Republican	1997 (Note: Hull took office after her predecessor (Fife Symington) resigned.)	Incumbent elected to full term.	✓ Jane Dee Hull (Republican) 60.9%; Paul Johnson (Democratic) 35.5%; Katherine Gallant (Libertarian) 2.7%
Arkansas	Mike Huckabee	Republican	1996 (Note: Huckabee took office after his predecessor (Jim Guy Tucker) resigned.)	Incumbent elected to full term.	✓ Mike Huckabee (Republican) 59.8%; Bill Bristow (Democratic) 38.7%; Keith Carle (Reform) 1.6%
California	Pete Wilson	Republican	1990	Incumbent term-limited. Democratic gain.	✓ Gray Davis (Democratic) 58.0%; Dan Lungren (Republican) 38.4%; Daniel Hamburg (Green) 1.2%
Colorado	Roy Romer	Democratic	1986	Incumbent term-limited. Republican gain.	✓ Bill Owens (Republican) 49.0%; Gail Schoettler (Democratic) 48.4%; Sandra D. Johnson (Libertarian) 1.7%
Connecticut	John G. Rowland	Republican	1994	Incumbent re-elected.	✓ John G. Rowland (Republican) 62.9%; Barbara Kennelly (Democratic) 35.4%
Florida	Lawton Chiles	Democratic	1990	Incumbent term-limited. Incumbent died December 12, 1998. (Note: Chiles was succeeded by lieutenant governor Buddy MacKay to finish the final weeks of his term.); Republican gain.	✓ Jeb Bush (Republican) 55.3%; Buddy MacKay (Democratic) 44.7%
Georgia	Zell Miller	Democratic	1990	Incumbent term-limited. Democratic hold.	✓ Roy Barnes (Democratic) 52.5%; Guy Millner (Republican) 44.1%; Jack Cashin (Libertarian) 3.4%
Hawaii	Ben Cayetano	Democratic	1994	Incumbent re-elected.	✓ Ben Cayetano (Democratic) 50.1%; Linda Lingle (Republican) 48.8%; George Peabody (Libertarian) 1.1%
Idaho	Phil Batt	Republican	1994	Incumbent retired. Republican hold.	✓ Dirk Kempthorne (Republican) 67.7%; Robert C. Huntley (Democratic) 29.1%; Peter Rickards (Independent) 3.2%
Illinois	Jim Edgar	Republican	1990	Incumbent retired. Republican hold.	✓ George Ryan (Republican) 51.0%; Glenn Poshard (Democratic) 47.5%; Lawrence Redmond (Reform) 1.5%
Iowa	Terry Branstad	Republican	1982	Incumbent retired. Democratic gain.	✓ Tom Vilsack (Democratic) 52.3%; Jim Ross Lightfoot (Republican) 46.5%
Kansas	Bill Graves	Republican	1994	Incumbent re-elected.	✓ Bill Graves (Republican) 73.4%; Tom Sawyer (Democratic) 22.6%; Kirt Poovey (Constitution) 2.9%; Darrel King (Reform) 1.1%
Maine	Angus King	Independent	1994	Incumbent re-elected.	✓ Angus King (Independent) 58.6%; James B. Longley Jr. (Republican) 18.9%; Thomas J. Connolly (Democratic) 12.0%; Pat LaMarche (Green) 6.8%; William P. Clarke Jr. (Constitution) 3.6%
Maryland	Parris Glendening	Democratic	1994	Incumbent re-elected.	✓ Parris Glendening (Democratic) 55.1%; Ellen Sauerbrey (Republican) 44.8%
Massachusetts	Paul Cellucci	Republican	1997 (Note: Cellucci took office after his predecessor (Bill Weld) resigned.)	Incumbent elected to full term.	✓ Paul Cellucci (Republican) 50.8%; Scott Harshbarger (Democratic) 47.4%; Dean Cook (Libertarian) 1.7%
Michigan	John Engler	Republican	1990	Incumbent re-elected.	✓ John Engler (Republican) 62.2%; Geoffrey Fieger (Democratic) 37.8%
Minnesota	Arne Carlson	Republican	1990	Incumbent retired. Reform gain.	✓ Jesse Ventura (Reform) 37.0%; Norm Coleman (Republican) 34.3%; Skip Humphrey (Democratic) 28.1%
Nebraska	Ben Nelson	Democratic	1990	Incumbent term-limited. Republican gain.	✓ Mike Johanns (Republican) 53.9%; Bill Hoppner (Democratic) 46.0%
Nevada	Bob Miller	Democratic	1989 (Note: Miller took office after his predecessor (Richard Bryan) resigned. He was subsequently elected in the 1990 Nevada gubernatorial election.)	Incumbent term-limited. Republican gain.	✓ Kenny Guinn (Republican) 51.6%; Jan Laverty Jones (Democratic) 42.0%; Chuck Horne (Independent American) 1.7%; Terry C. Savage (Libertarian) 1.7%
New Hampshire	Jeanne Shaheen	Democratic	1996	Incumbent re-elected.	✓ Jeanne Shaheen (Democratic) 66.1%; Jay Lucas (Republican) 30.9%; Ken Blevens (Libertarian) 2.7%
New Mexico	Gary Johnson	Republican	1994	Incumbent re-elected.	✓ Gary Johnson (Republican) 54.5%; Martin Chávez (Democratic) 45.5%
New York	George Pataki	Republican	1994	Incumbent re-elected.	✓ George Pataki (Republican) 54.3%; Peter Vallone Sr. (Democratic) 33.2%; Tom Golisano (Independence) 7.7%; Betsy McCaughey (Liberal) 1.6%; Michael Reynolds (Right to Life) 1.2%; Al Lewis (Green) 1.1%
Ohio	George Voinovich	Republican	1990	Incumbent term-limited. Republican hold.	✓ Bob Taft (Republican) 50.0%; Lee Fisher (Democratic) 44.7%; John R. Mitchel (Reform) 3.3%; Zanna Feitler (Natural Law) 1.9%
Oklahoma	Frank Keating	Republican	1994	Incumbent re-elected.	✓ Frank Keating (Republican) 57.9%; Laura Boyd (Democratic) 40.9%; Hoppy Heidelberg (Reform) 1.2%
Oregon	John Kitzhaber	Democratic	1994	Incumbent re-elected.	✓ John Kitzhaber (Democratic) 64.4%; Bill Sizemore (Republican) 30.0%; Richard P. Burke (Libertarian) 1.8%; Blair Bobier (Pacific Green) 1.4%
Pennsylvania	Tom Ridge	Republican	1994	Incumbent re-elected.	✓ Tom Ridge (Republican) 57.4%; Ivan Itkin (Democratic) 31.0%; Peg Luksik (Constitution) 10.4%; Ken Krawchuk (Libertarian) 1.1%
Rhode Island	Lincoln Almond	Republican	1994	Incumbent re-elected.	✓ Lincoln Almond (Republican) 51.0%; Myrth York (Democratic) 42.1%; Robert J. Healey (Cool Moose) 6.3%
South Carolina	David Beasley	Republican	1994	Incumbent lost re-election. Democratic gain.	✓ Jim Hodges (Democratic) 53.2%; David Beasley (Republican) 45.2%; Timothy Moultrie (Libertarian) 1.4%
South Dakota	Bill Janklow	Republican	1978; 1986 (term-limited); 1994	Incumbent re-elected.	✓ Bill Janklow (Republican) 64.0%; Bernie Hunhoff (Democratic) 32.8%; Bob Newland (Libertarian) 1.7%; Ronald Wieczorek (Independent) 1.4%
Tennessee	Don Sundquist	Republican	1994	Incumbent re-elected.	✓ Don Sundquist (Republican) 68.6%; John Jay Hooker (Democratic) 29.5%
Texas	George W. Bush	Republican	1994	Incumbent re-elected.	✓ George W. Bush (Republican) 68.2%; Garry Mauro (Democratic) 31.2%
Vermont	Howard Dean	Democratic	1991 (Note: Dean took office after his predecessor (Richard Snelling) died. He was subsequently elected in the 1992 Vermont gubernatorial election.)	Incumbent re-elected.	✓ Howard Dean (Democratic) 55.7%; Ruth Dwyer (Republican) 41.1%; Joel Williams (Grassroots) 1.5%; Amy Berkey (Libertarian) 1.0%
Wisconsin	Tommy Thompson	Republican	1986	Incumbent re-elected.	✓ Tommy Thompson (Republican) 59.7%; Ed Garvey (Democratic) 38.7%
Wyoming	Jim Geringer	Republican	1994	Incumbent re-elected.	✓ Jim Geringer (Republican) 55.6%; John Vinich (Democratic) 40.5%; Dave Dawson (Libertarian) 3.9%

=== Territories and federal district ===
Territory	Incumbent	Party	First elected	Result	Candidates
District of Columbia	Marion Barry	Democratic	1994	Incumbent retired. Democratic hold.	✓ Anthony A. Williams (Democratic) 66.2%; Carol Schwartz (Republican) 30.2%; John Gloster (Statehood Green) 1.7%
Guam	Carl Gutierrez	Democratic	1994	Incumbent re-elected.	✓ Carl Gutierrez (Democratic) 51.2%; Joseph F. Ada (Republican) 44.8%
U.S. Virgin Islands	Roy Schneider	Independent	1994	Incumbent lost re-election. Democratic gain.	✓ Charles Turnbull (Democratic) 58.9%; Roy Schneider (Independent) 41.1%

== Closest races ==
States where the margin of victory was under 1%:

1. Colorado, 0.6%

States where the margin of victory was under 5%:

1. Hawaii, 1.3%
2. Minnesota, 2.7%
3. Massachusetts, 3.4%
4. Illinois, 3.5%

States where the margin of victory was under 10%:

1. Ohio, 5.3%
2. Iowa, 5.8%
3. Guam, 6.4%
4. Nebraska, 7.9%
5. South Carolina, 8.0%
6. Georgia, 8.4%
7. Rhode Island, 8.9%
8. New Mexico, 9.0%
9. Nevada, 9.6%

== Alabama ==
1998 Alabama gubernatorial election
- November 3, 1998
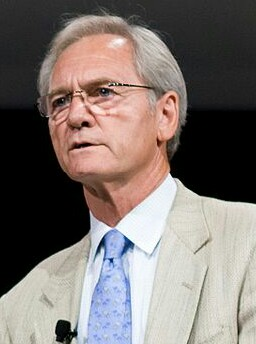

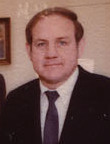
Nominee	Don Siegelman	Fob James
Party	Democratic	Republican
Popular vote	752,087	546,504
Percentage	57.92%	42.08%
- County results Siegelman: 50–60% 60–70% 70–80% 80–90% James: 50–60%
Governor before election
Fob James
Republican
Elected Governor
Don Siegelman
Democratic

The Alabama gubernatorial election of 1998 was held on November 3, 1998, to select the governor of Alabama. The election saw incumbent Governor Fob James (R) against Lieutenant Governor Don Siegelman (D). The result saw Don Siegelman win a decisive victory over Fob James. This was the second of three consecutive Alabama gubernatorial elections in which the incumbent was defeated. As of 2026, this was the last time that a Democrat was elected governor of Alabama.

== Alaska ==
1998 Alaska gubernatorial election
- November 3, 1998
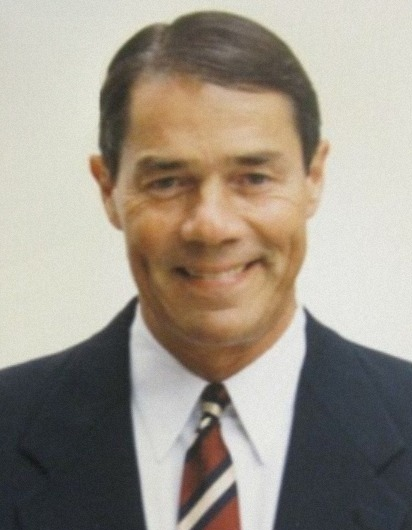

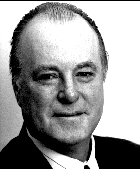

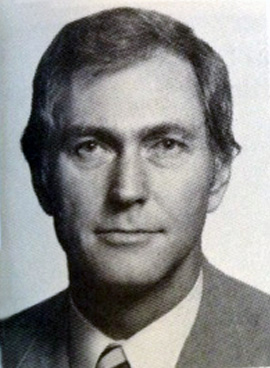

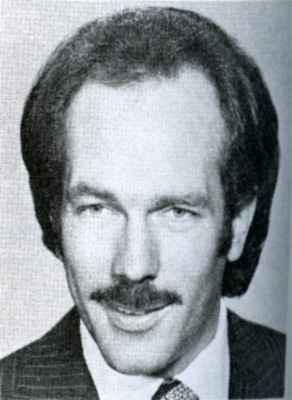
Nominee	Tony Knowles	Robin L. Taylor (write-in)
Party	Democratic	Republican
Alliance		Alaska Republican
Running mate	Fran Ulmer	none
Popular vote	112,879	40,209
Percentage	51.27%	18.26%
Nominee	John H. Lindauer	Ray Metcalfe
Party	Republican	Republican Moderate
Running mate	Jerry Ward	Clyde Baxley
Popular vote	39,331	13,540
Percentage	17.86%	6.15%
- Results by state house district Knowles: 30–40% 40–50% 50–60% 60–70% 70–80% Write-In: (Note: Since the vast majority of the write-in votes were towards Republican Robin L. Taylor, he likely won the Ketchikan district. However, the original election report does not separate the write-in votes by candidate, so it cannot be known for sure.) 40–50%
Governor before election
Tony Knowles
Democratic
Elected Governor
Tony Knowles
Democratic

The 1998 Alaska gubernatorial general election took place on November 3, 1998. The election resulted in a landslide for the Democratic incumbent, Tony Knowles, who had won the 1994 gubernatorial election by only 536 votes. Jim Sykes, founder of the Green Party of Alaska, ran on that party's ticket, but Desa Jacobsson later replaced him on the ballot.

== Arizona ==
1998 Arizona gubernatorial election
- November 3, 1998
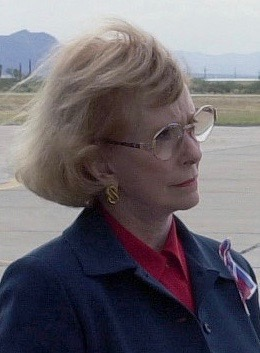

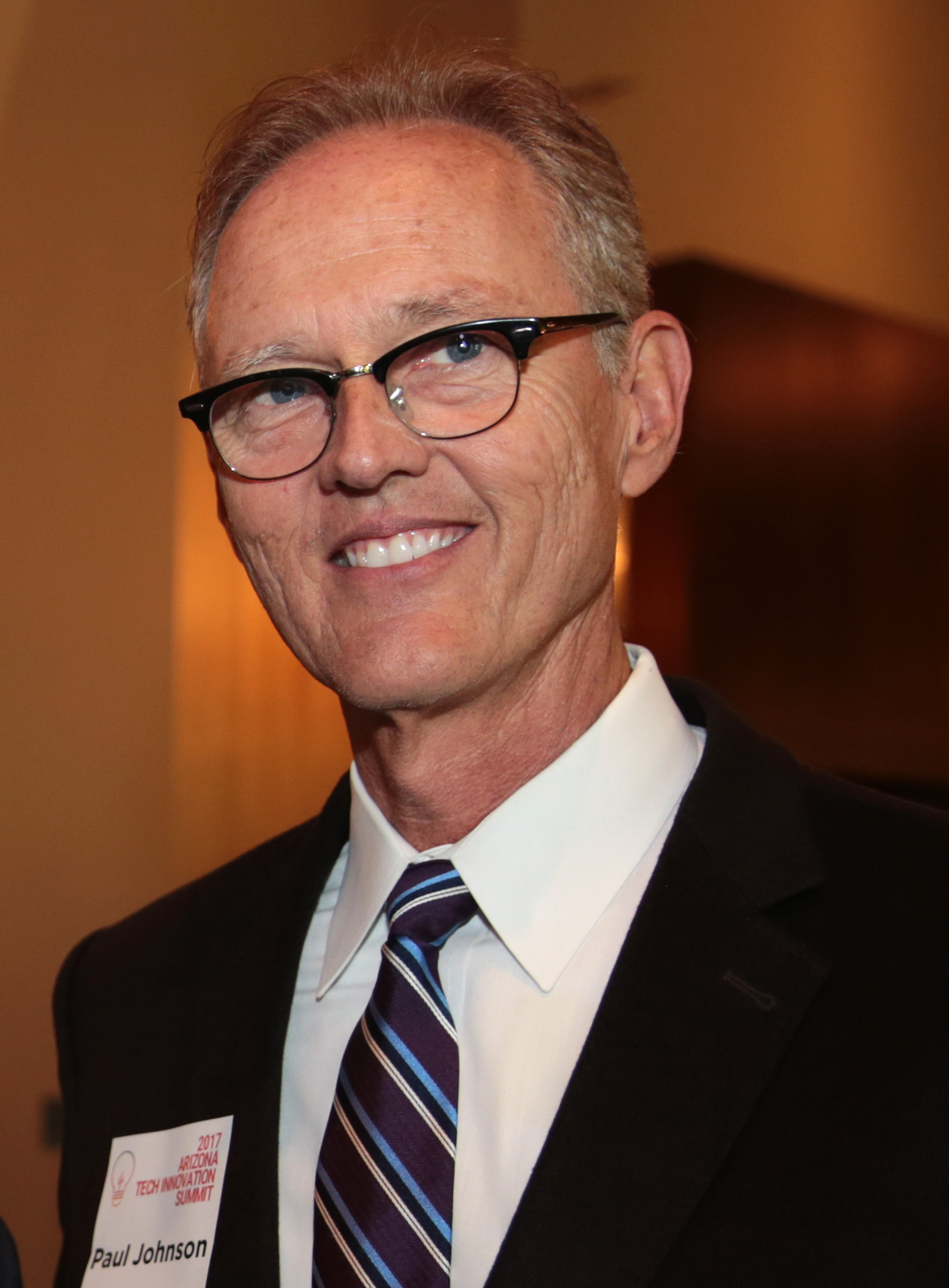
Nominee	Jane Dee Hull	Paul Johnson
Party	Republican	Democratic
Popular vote	620,188	361,552
Percentage	60.9%	35.5%
- County results Hull: 40–50% 50–60% 60–70% Johnson: 50–60%
Governor before election
Jane Dee Hull
Republican
Elected Governor
Jane Dee Hull
Republican

The 1998 Arizona gubernatorial election took place on November 3, 1998, for the post of Governor of Arizona. Jane Dee Hull, the incumbent Republican Governor of Arizona, defeated the Democratic nominee and Mayor of Phoenix, Paul Johnson in a landslide victory. Hull became the first woman to win a gubernatorial election in Arizona, although not the first woman to serve as governor of Arizona, (a distinction held by Democrat Rose Mofford, who ascended to the position in 1988 upon Republican Evan Mecham's impeachment and removal from office, and who served until 1990, declining to run for a full term).

== Arkansas ==
1998 Arkansas gubernatorial election
- November 3, 1998
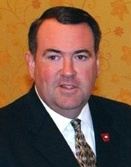

Nominee	Mike Huckabee	Bill Bristow
Party	Republican	Democratic
Popular vote	421,989	272,923
Percentage	59.77%	38.66%
- County results Huckabee: 40–50% 50–60% 60–70% 70–80% Bristow: 50–60%
Governor before election
Mike Huckabee
Republican
Elected Governor
Mike Huckabee
Republican

The 1998 Arkansas gubernatorial election took place on November 3, 1998, for the post of Governor of Arkansas. Incumbent Republican governor Mike Huckabee defeated Democratic nominee Bill Bristow to win a full term in office.

== California ==
1998 California gubernatorial election
- November 3, 1998
- Turnout: 41.43%
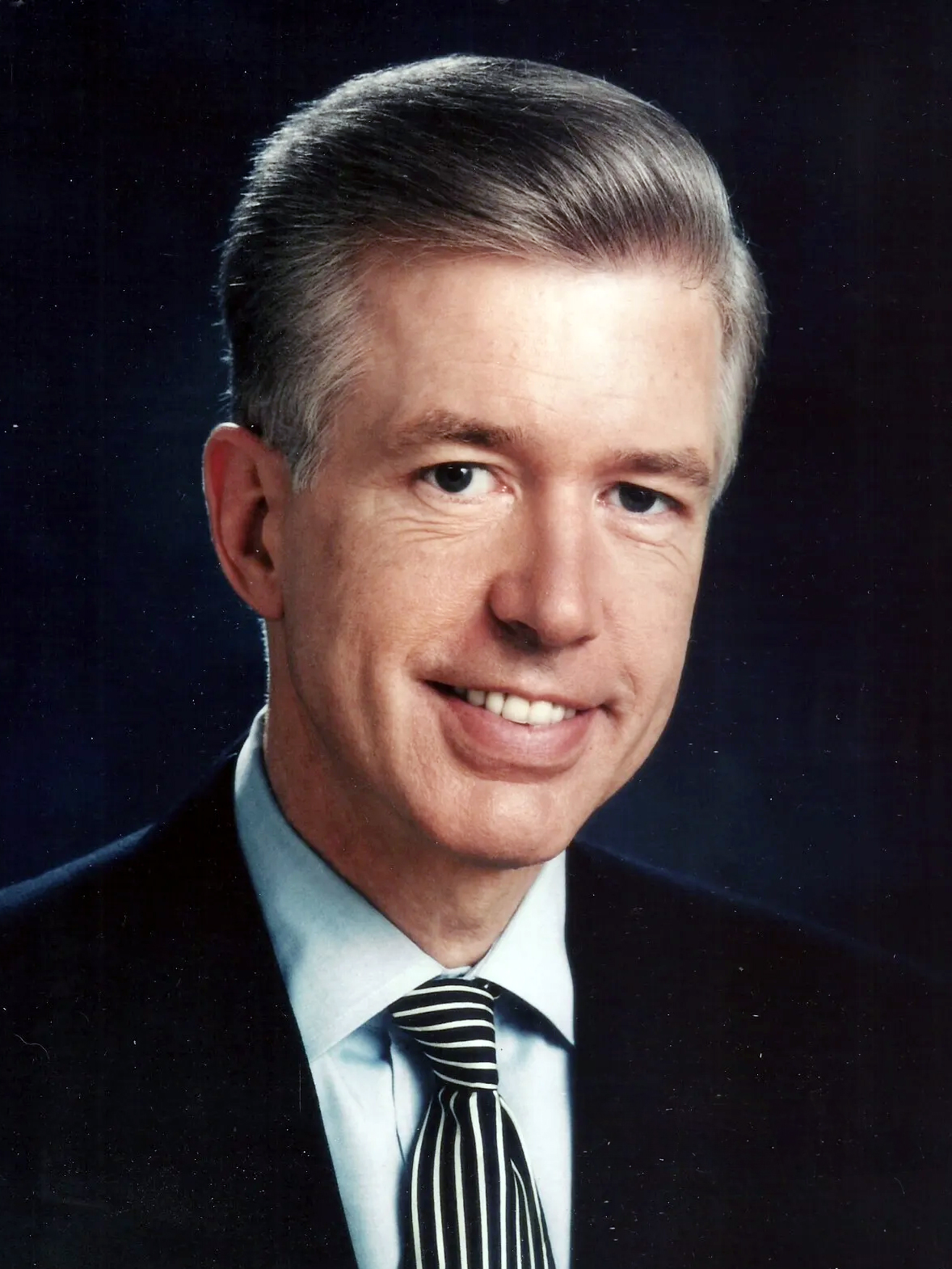

Nominee	Gray Davis	Dan Lungren
Party	Democratic	Republican
Popular vote	4,860,702	3,218,030
Percentage	57.97%	38.38%
- Davis: 40-50% 50–60% 60–70% 70–80% 80–90% Lungren: 40–50% 50–60%
Governor before election
Pete Wilson
Republican
Elected Governor
Gray Davis
Democratic

The 1998 California gubernatorial election was an election that occurred on November 3, 1998, resulting in the election of Lieutenant Governor Gray Davis as the state's first Democratic governor in 16 years. Davis won the general election by an almost 20% margin over his closest opponent, Republican Attorney General Dan Lungren. Davis succeeded Pete Wilson who was term limited. The 1998 California gubernatorial election featured the state's only gubernatorial blanket primary, a practice which was later struck down in United States Supreme Court in California Democratic Party v. Jones in 2000.

== Colorado ==
1998 Colorado gubernatorial election
- November 3, 1998
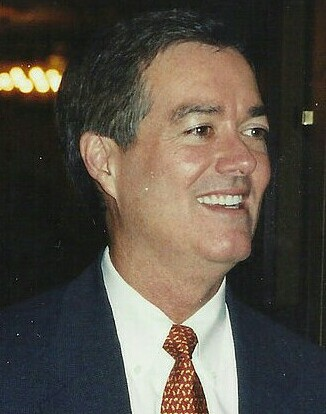

Nominee	Bill Owens	Gail Schoettler
Party	Republican	Democratic
Running mate	Joe Rogers	Bernie Buescher
Popular vote	648,202	639,905
Percentage	49.04%	48.42%
- County results Owens: 40–50% 50–60% 60–70% Schoettler: 40–50% 50–60% 60–70%
Governor before election
Roy Romer
Democratic
Elected Governor
Bill Owens
Republican

The 1998 Colorado gubernatorial election was held on November 3, 1998, to select the governor of the state of Colorado. Under newly applicable term limits, incumbent Governor Roy Romer, a Democrat, was unable to seek re-election. Lieutenant Governor Gail Schoettler, ran to succeed Romer, and won the Democratic primary; her running mate, Bernie Buescher, won the lieutenant-gubernatorial primary unopposed. In the Republican primary, Bill Owens, the State Treasurer, and his eventual running mate, Joe Rogers, won their respective primaries by wide margins.

In the general election, Owens narrowly defeated Schoettler, aided by a strong performance by Republican U.S. Senator Ben Nighthorse Campbell in his re-election campaign. Owens's narrow election meant that he was the first Republican Governor in 24 years, and Rogers's election made him the second Black Lieutenant Governor in the state's history, after George L. Brown, who was elected in 1974. This was also the last election in which Colorado held separate primary elections for governor and lieutenant governor; following a statutory change in 2000, gubernatorial candidates selected their running mates prior to the primary.

== Connecticut ==
1998 Connecticut gubernatorial election
- November 3, 1998
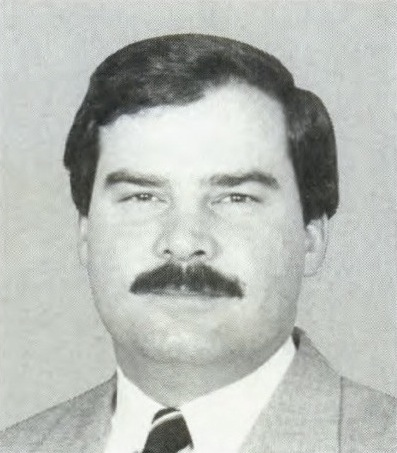

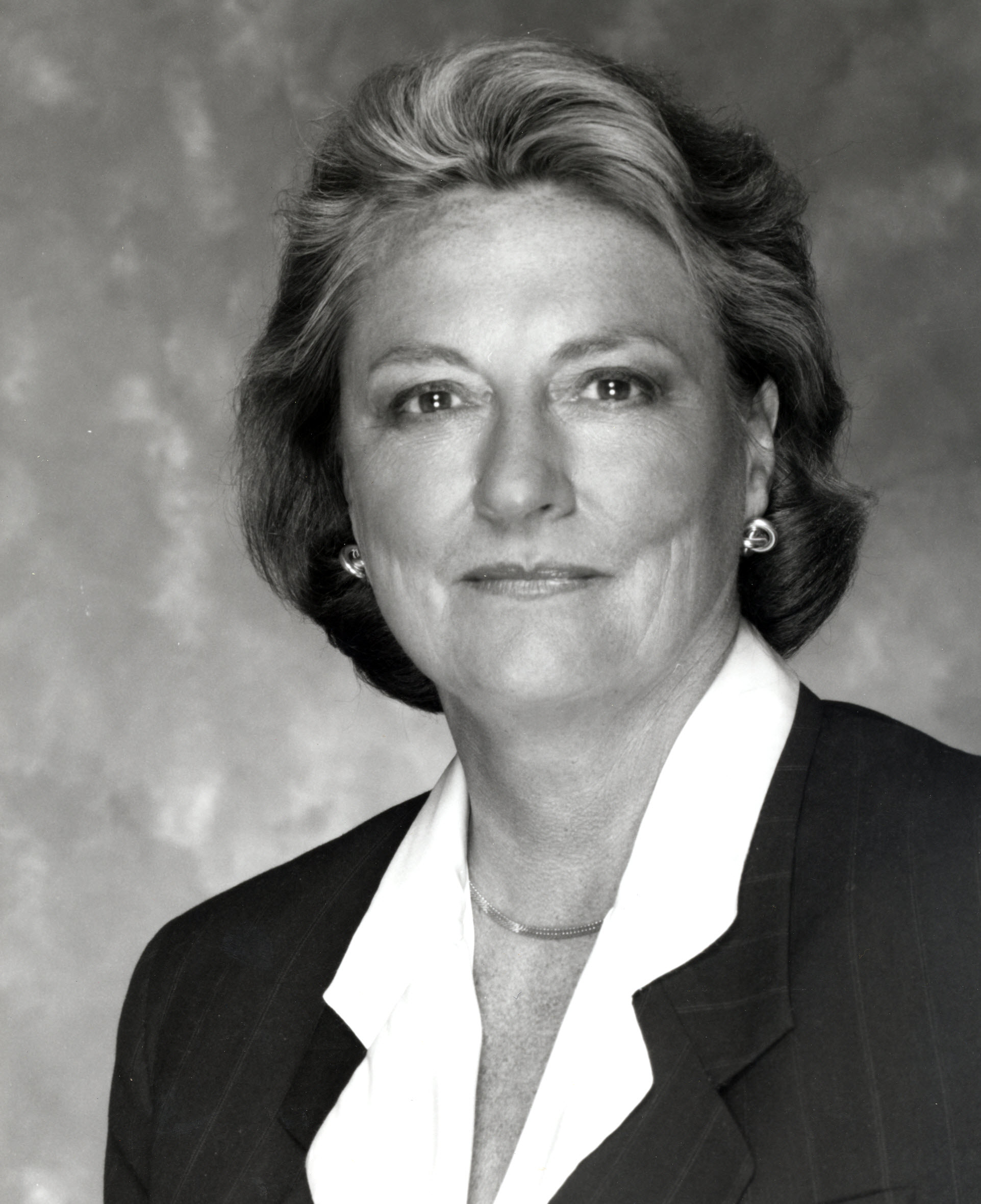
Nominee	John G. Rowland	Barbara B. Kennelly
Party	Republican	Democratic
Running mate	Jodi Rell	Joe Courtney
Popular vote	628,707	354,187
Percentage	62.9%	35.4%
- Rowland: 40–50% 50–60% 60–70% 70–80% 80–90% Kennelly: 40–50% 50–60% 60–70% 70–80%
Governor before election
John G. Rowland
Republican
Elected Governor
John G. Rowland
Republican

The 1998 Connecticut gubernatorial election took place on November 3, 1998, and incumbent Republican Governor John G. Rowland won re-election against Democratic Candidate United States Congresswoman Barbara B. Kennelly. This election was the first time since 1944 that an incumbent Republican Governor of Connecticut was re-elected.

== Florida ==
1998 Florida gubernatorial election
- November 3, 1998
- Turnout: 49.5%
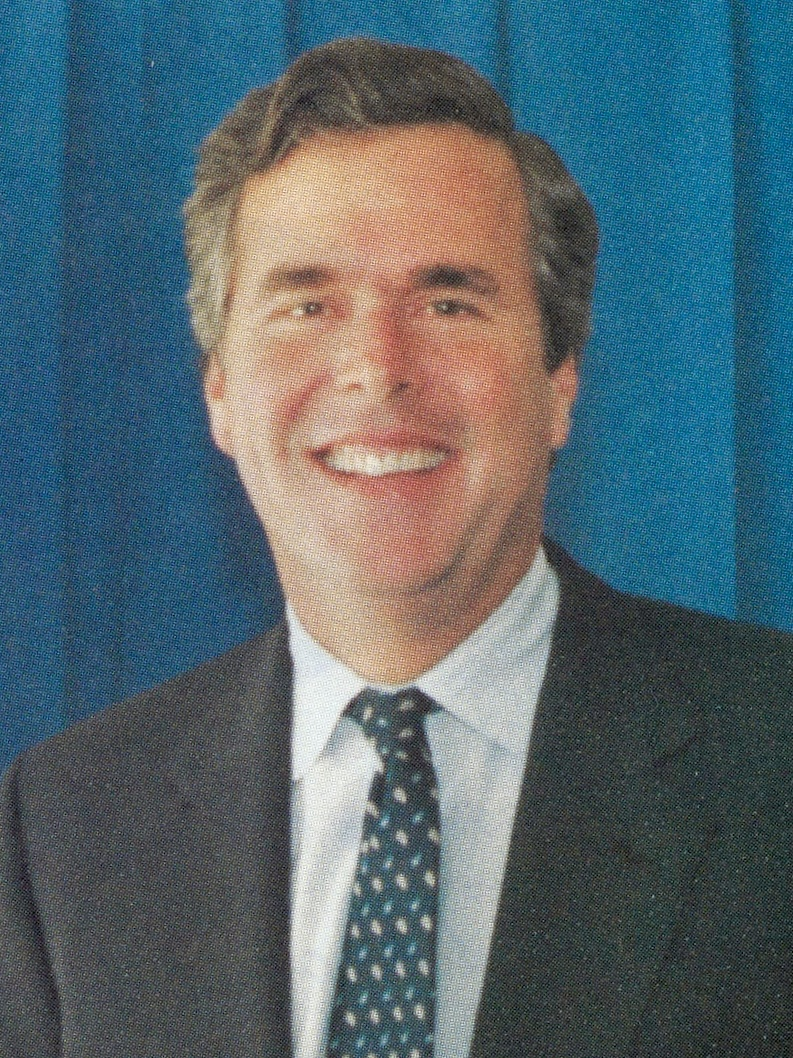

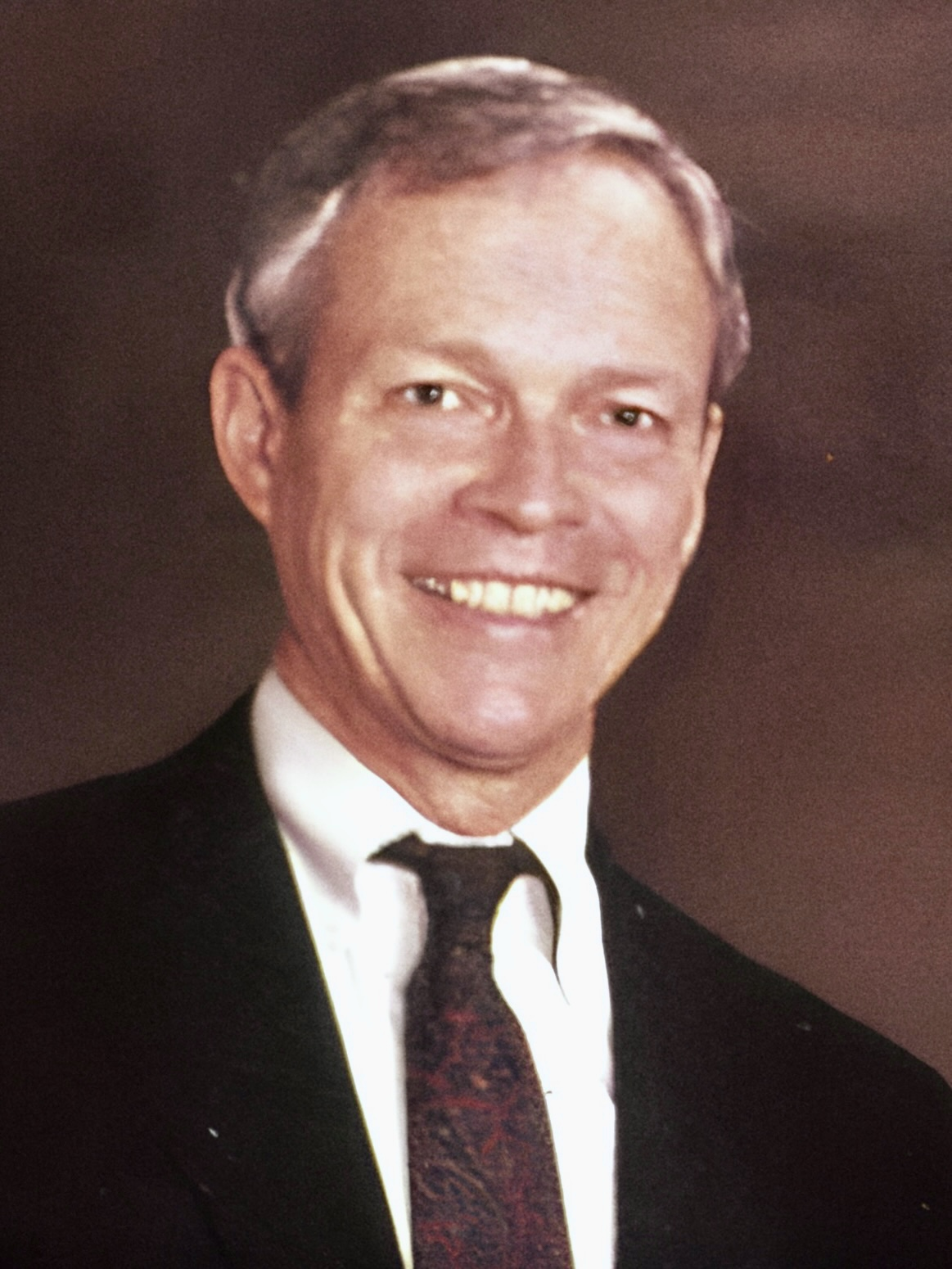
Nominee	Jeb Bush	Buddy MacKay
Party	Republican	Democratic
Running mate	Frank Brogan	Rick Dantzler
Popular vote	2,191,105	1,773,054
Percentage	55.27%	44.72%
- Bush: 50–60% 60–70% 70–80% 80–90% >90% MacKay: 50–60% 60–70% 70–80% 80–90% >90% Tie: 40–50% 50% No votes
Governor before election
Lawton Chiles
Democratic
Elected Governor
Jeb Bush
Republican

The 1998 Florida gubernatorial election was held on November 3, 1998, to determine the Governor for the State of Florida. Two-term Democratic incumbent Governor Lawton Chiles was term-limited and could not run for re-election. John Ellis "Jeb" Bush, who had previously run for governor in 1994 was the Republican nominee, and incumbent Lieutenant Governor Kenneth Hood "Buddy" MacKay was the Democratic nominee. Bush defeated MacKay by nearly 11% of the vote, and won his first of two terms as governor.

== Georgia ==
1998 Georgia gubernatorial election
- November 3, 1998
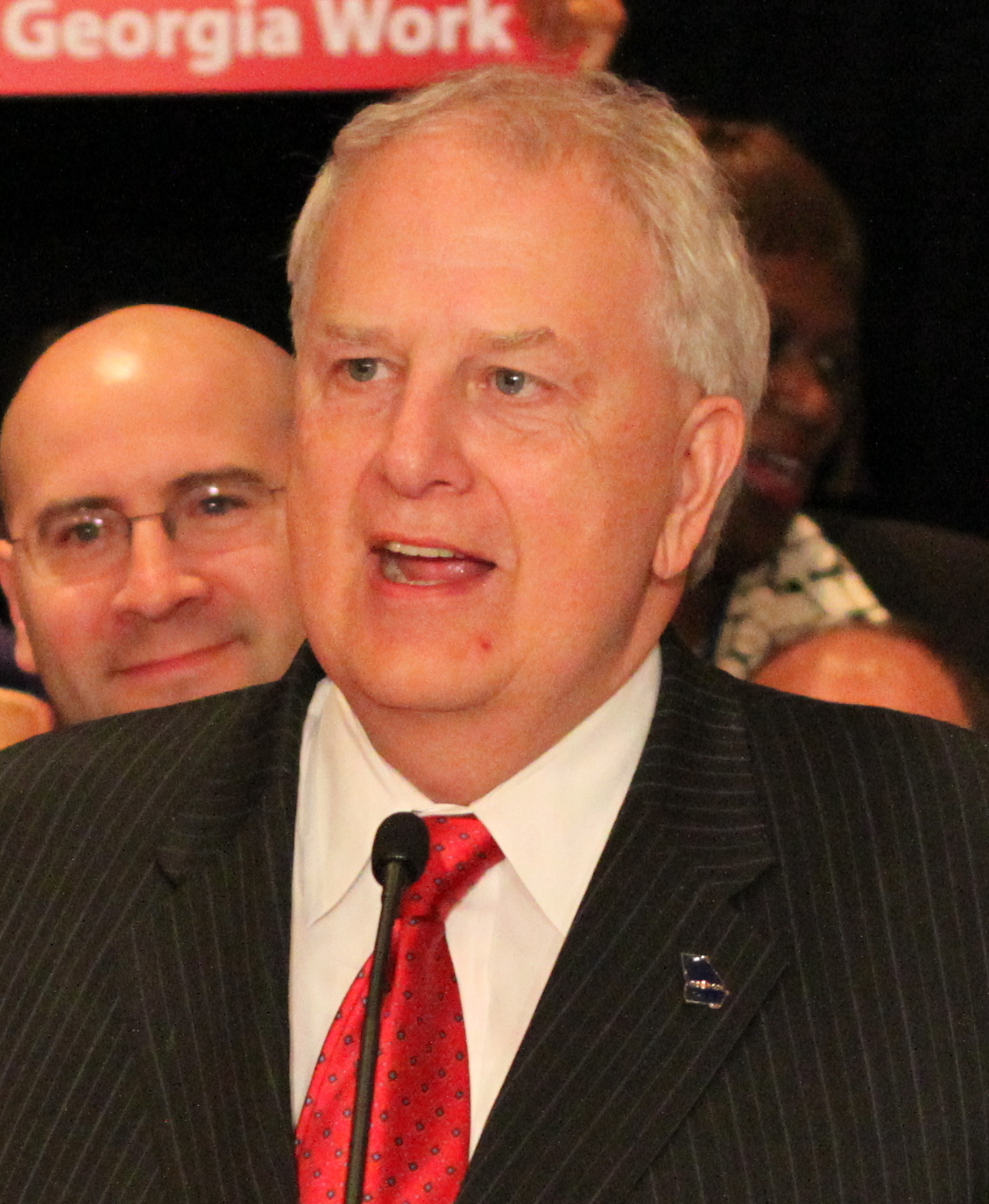

Nominee	Roy Barnes	Guy Millner
Party	Democratic	Republican
Popular vote	941,076	790,201
Percentage	52.49%	44.08%
- County results Barnes: 40-50% 50–60% 60–70% 70–80% 80–90% Millner: 40–50% 50–60% 60–70%
Governor before election
Zell Miller
Democratic
Elected Governor
Roy Barnes
Democratic

The 1998 Georgia gubernatorial election was held on November 3, 1998. Incumbent Democratic governor Zell Miller was unable to seek re-election due to term limits, therefore creating an open seat. To replace him, State Representative Roy Barnes won the Democratic Party's nomination after a close and highly contested primary election, while businessman Guy Millner, who had run for governor and the United States Senate in the previous four years, won the nomination of the Republican Party.

In the general election, Barnes was able to defeat Millner by a margin of victory larger than Governor Miller's victory over Millner four years prior, which was in part due to the unpopularity and controversy of Mitch Skandalakis, the Republican nominee for Lieutenant Governor of Georgia.

== Hawaii ==
1998 Hawaii gubernatorial election
- November 3, 1998
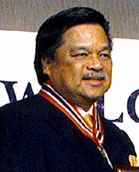

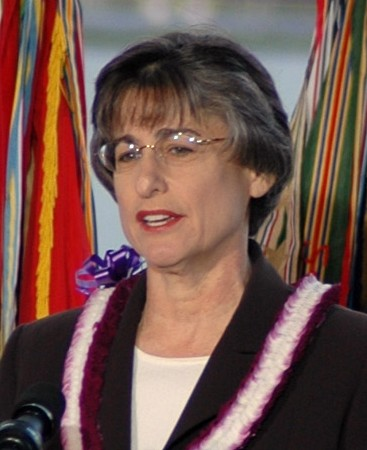
Nominee	Ben Cayetano	Linda Lingle
Party	Democratic	Republican
Running mate	Mazie Hirono	Stan Koki
Popular vote	204,206	198,952
Percentage	50.1%	48.8%
- County results Cayetano: 50–60% Lingle: 40–50% 50–60%
Governor before election
Ben Cayetano
Democratic
Elected Governor
Ben Cayetano
Democratic

The 1998 Hawaii gubernatorial election was held on November 3, 1998. Incumbent Democratic Governor of Hawaii Ben Cayetano ran for re-election to a second and final term, and he was contested by Maui Mayor Linda Lingle. The race between Cayetano and Lingle was close, with Lingle holding a sizable polling advantage. Ultimately, Cayetano narrowly won re-election to a second term in the closest gubernatorial election in Hawaii's history.

== Idaho ==
1998 Idaho gubernatorial election
- November 3, 1998
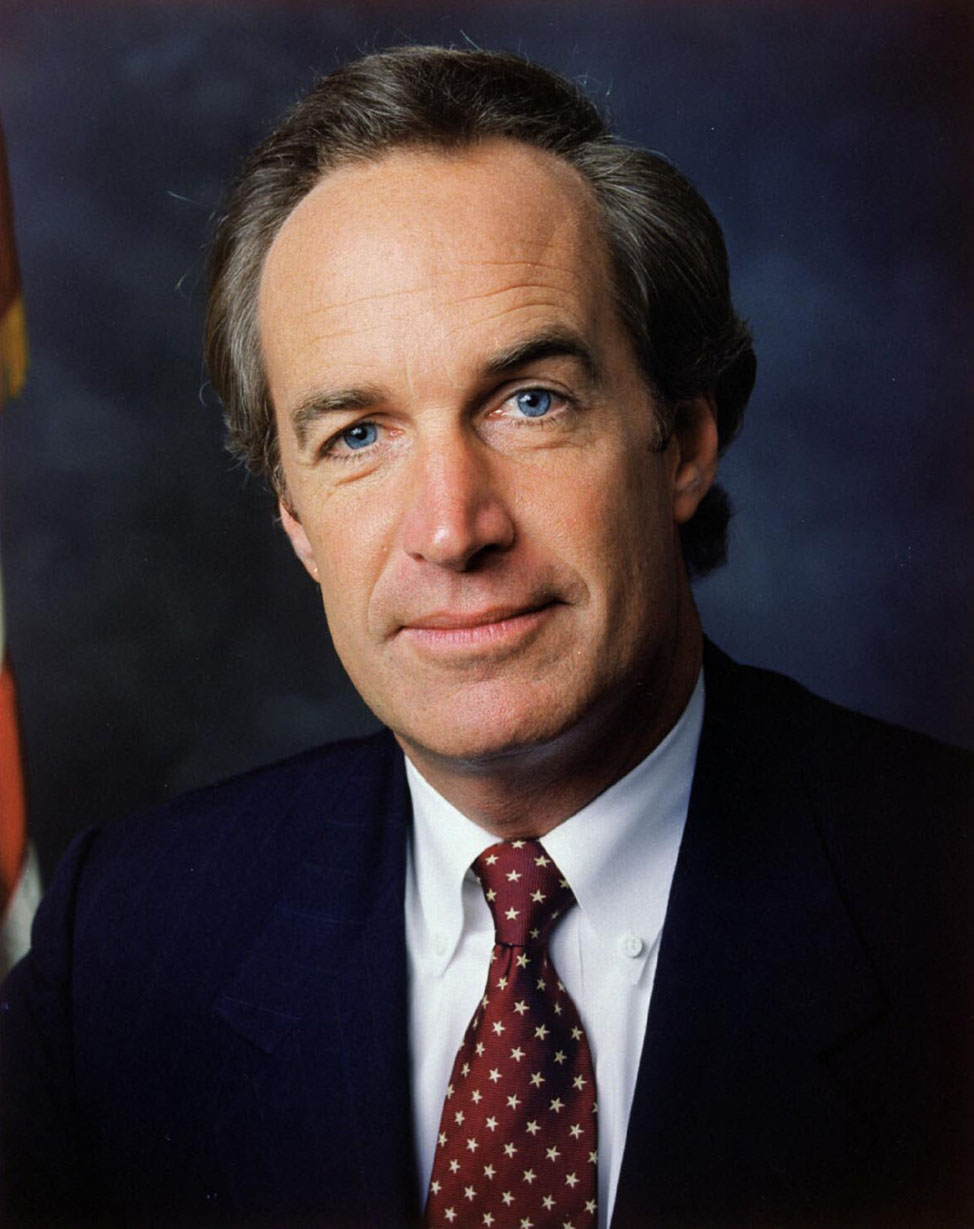

Nominee	Dirk Kempthorne	Robert Huntley
Party	Republican	Democratic
Popular vote	258,095	110,815
Percentage	67.7%	29.1%
- County results Kempthorne: 50–60% 60–70% 70–80% 80–90% Huntley: 50–60%
Governor before election
Phil Batt
Republican
Elected Governor
Dirk Kempthorne
Republican

The 1998 Idaho gubernatorial election was held on November 3, 1998, to elect the Governor of Idaho. Phil Batt, the Republican incumbent, chose not to run for a second term. The Republican nominee, United States Senator Dirk Kempthorne, handily defeated the Democratic nominee, former Idaho Supreme Court justice Robert C. Huntley, to keep the seat in GOP hands.

== Illinois ==
1998 Illinois gubernatorial election
- November 3, 1998
- Turnout: 49.72% ▼1.05 pp
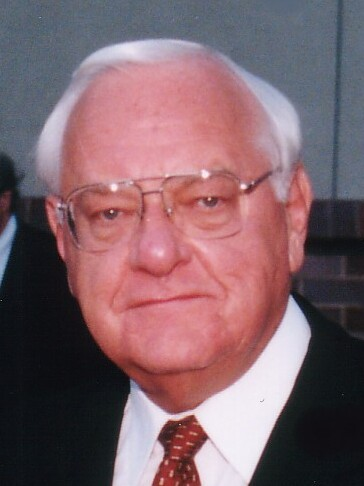

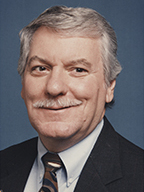
Nominee	George Ryan	Glenn Poshard
Party	Republican	Democratic
Running mate	Corinne Wood	Mary Lou Kearns
Popular vote	1,714,094	1,594,191
Percentage	51.03%	47.46%
- Ryan: 40–50% 50–60% 60–70% 70–80% Poshard: 50–60% 60–70% 70–80% 80–90%
Governor before election
Jim Edgar
Republican
Elected Governor
George Ryan
Republican

The 1998 Illinois gubernatorial election took place on November 3, 1998. Incumbent Republican Governor Jim Edgar did not run for a third term in office. Republican nominee George Ryan, the Illinois Secretary of State, narrowly won the election against Democratic Congressman Glenn Poshard.

With this election Corinne Wood became the first female lieutenant governor of the state.

== Iowa ==
1998 Iowa gubernatorial election
- November 3, 1998
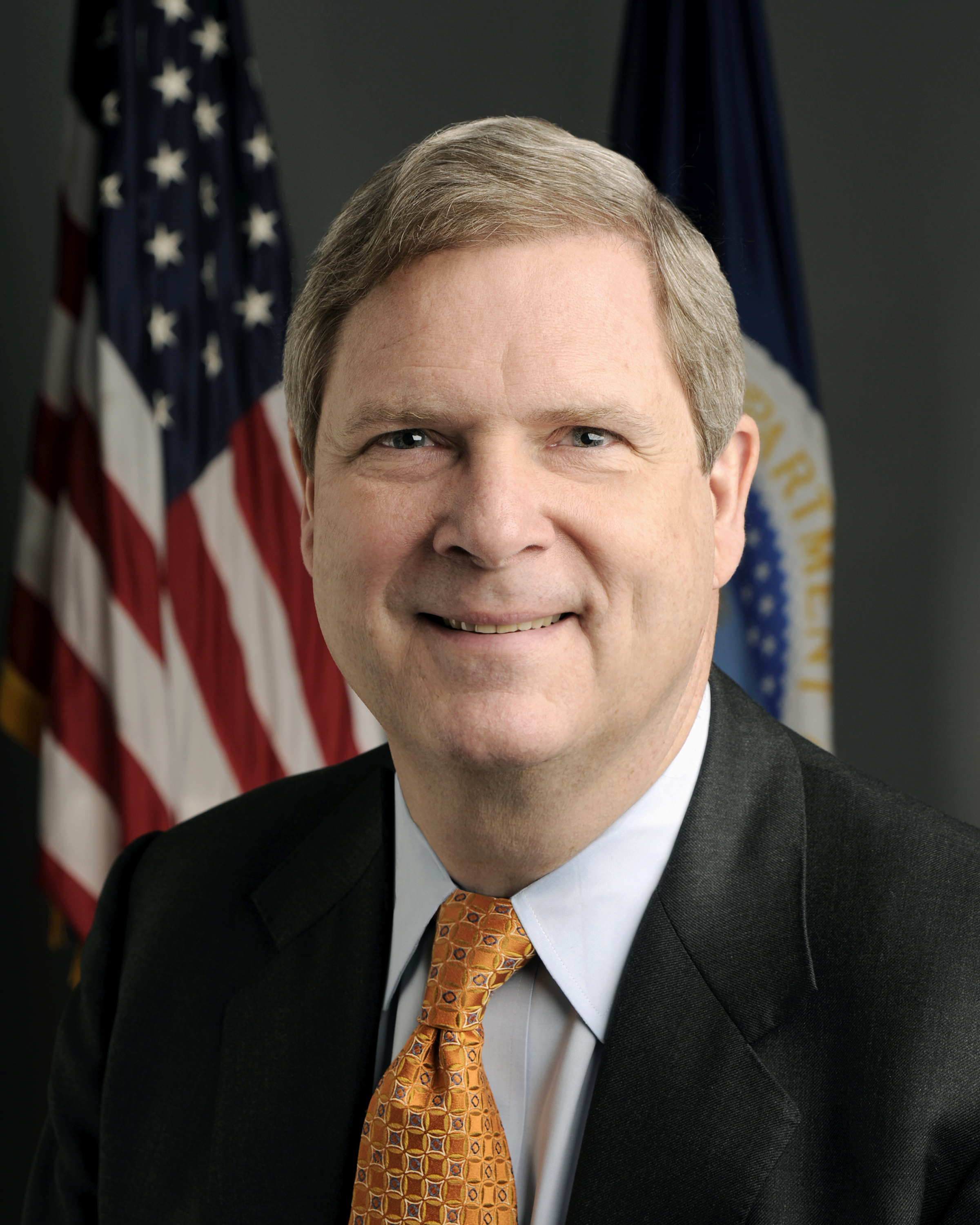

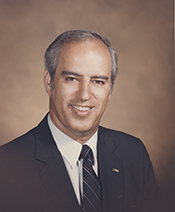
Nominee	Tom Vilsack	Jim Ross Lightfoot
Party	Democratic	Republican
Popular vote	500,231	444,787
Percentage	52.3%	46.5%
- County results Vilsack: 40–50% 50–60% 60–70% Lightfoot: 40–50% 50–60% 60–70% 70–80% 80–90%
Governor before election
Terry Branstad
Republican
Elected Governor
Tom Vilsack
Democratic

The 1998 Iowa gubernatorial election took place on November 3, 1998. Incumbent Republican Governor Terry Branstad did not seek re-election to a fifth consecutive term; he later successfully ran again in 2010 and 2014.

== Kansas ==
1998 Kansas gubernatorial election
- November 3, 1998
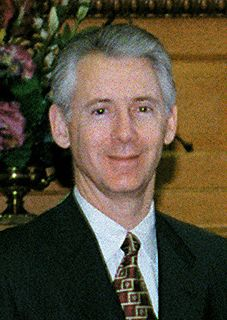

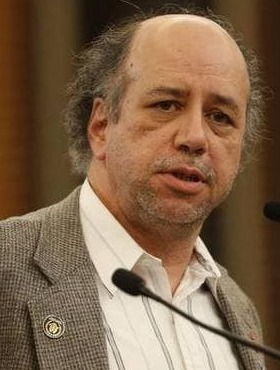
Nominee	Bill Graves	Tom Sawyer
Party	Republican	Democratic
Running mate	Gary Sherrer	Elizabeth Baker
Popular vote	544,882	168,243
Percentage	73.4%	22.7%
- County results Graves: 50–60% 60–70% 70–80% 80–90%
Governor before election
Bill Graves
Republican
Elected Governor
Bill Graves
Republican

The 1998 Kansas gubernatorial election took place on November 3, 1998. Incumbent Republican Governor Bill Graves won re-election in a 50% landslide over his opponent, State Representative Tom Sawyer. Graves also became the first Republican incumbent Governor of Kansas to win reelection since John Anderson Jr.'s reelection victory in 1962.

== Maine ==
1998 Maine gubernatorial election
- November 3, 1998
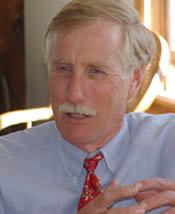

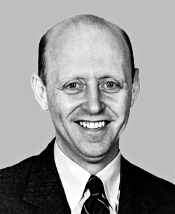

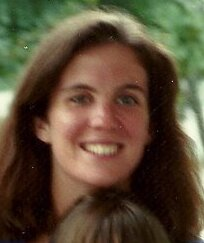
Nominee	Angus King	James B. Longley Jr.
Party	Independent	Republican
Popular vote	246,772	79,716
Percentage	58.61%	18.93%
Nominee	Tom Connolly	Pat LaMarche
Party	Democratic	Green
Popular vote	50,506	28,722
Percentage	12.00%	6.82%
- King: 30–40% 40–50% 50–60% 60–70% Longley: 30–40% 40–50% 50–60% >90% Connolly: 50–60% Clarke: 30–40% Tie: 40–50% 50%
Governor before election
Angus King
Independent
Elected Governor
Angus King
Independent

The 1998 Maine gubernatorial election took place on November 3, 1998, to elect the governor of Maine. Incumbent Independent governor Angus King won re-election to a second term, defeating Republican nominee James B. Longley Jr., Democratic nominee Thomas J. Connolly, Green Independent nominee Pat LaMarche and Taxpayers' Party nominee William P. Clarke Jr.

== Maryland ==
1998 Maryland gubernatorial election
- November 3, 1998
- Turnout: 60.59% ▼0.08%

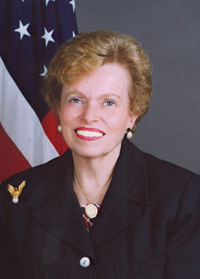
Nominee	Parris Glendening	Ellen Sauerbrey
Party	Democratic	Republican
Running mate	Kathleen Kennedy Townsend	Richard D. Bennett
Popular vote	846,972	688,357
Percentage	55.14%	44.82%
- County results Glendening: 50–60% 60–70% 70–80% 80–90% Sauerbrey: 50–60% 60–70%
Governor before election
Parris Glendening
Democratic
Elected Governor
Parris Glendening
Democratic

The 1998 Maryland gubernatorial election was held on November 3, 1998. Incumbent Democratic governor Parris Glendening sought re-election. Governor Glendening emerged victorious from the Democratic primary after defeating several candidates. Former state delegate Ellen Sauerbrey, who was the 1994 Republican nominee for governor, ran again for governor and won her party's nomination. The election between Glendening and Sauerbrey four years prior was extremely contentious, and ended with the Sauerbrey campaign challenging the results. Ultimately, despite the controversial nature of the previous election, Governor Glendening comfortably beat back Sauerbrey's spirited challenge, winning his second and final term as governor.

== Massachusetts ==
1998 Massachusetts gubernatorial election
- November 2, 1998
- Turnout: 51.19% ▼18.86
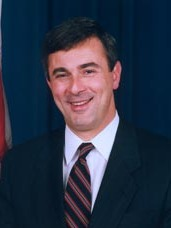

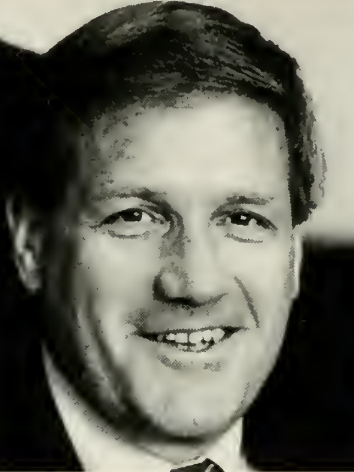
Nominee	Paul Cellucci	Scott Harshbarger
Party	Republican	Democratic
Running mate	Jane Swift	Warren Tolman
Popular vote	967,160	901,843
Percentage	49.98%	46.60%
- Cellucci: 40–50% 50–60% 60–70% 70–80% Harshbarger: 40–50% 50–60% 60–70% 70–80%
Governor before election
Paul Cellucci (acting)
Republican
Elected Governor
Paul Cellucci
Republican

The 1998 Massachusetts gubernatorial election was held on November 3, 1998. Acting Governor Paul Cellucci was elected to his first term as Governor of Massachusetts.

== Michigan ==
1998 Michigan gubernatorial election
- November 3, 1998
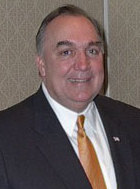

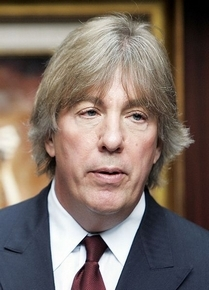
Nominee	John Engler	Geoffrey Fieger
Party	Republican	Democratic
Running mate	Dick Posthumus	Jim Agee
Popular vote	1,883,005	1,143,574
Percentage	62.2%	37.8%
- County results Engler: 50–60% 60–70% 70–80% 80–90% Fieger: 50–60%
Governor before election
John Engler
Republican
Elected Governor
John Engler
Republican

The 1998 Michigan gubernatorial election was held on November 3, 1998, to elect the Governor and Lieutenant Governor of the state of Michigan. Incumbent Governor John Engler, a member of the Republican Party, was re-elected over Democratic Party nominee Geoffrey Fieger, a lawyer who had represented the assisted suicide advocate Jack Kevorkian.

== Minnesota ==
1998 Minnesota gubernatorial election
- November 3, 1998
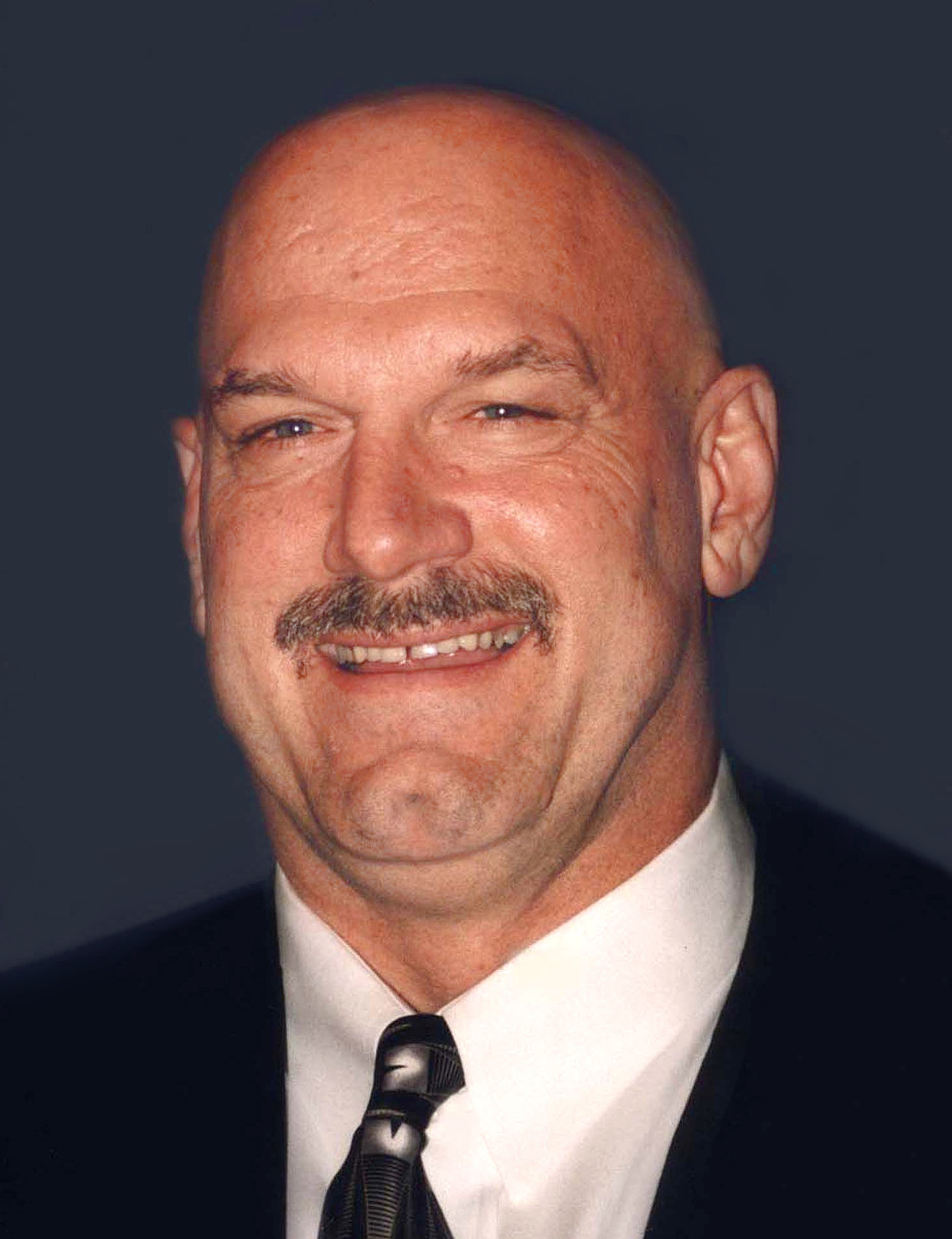

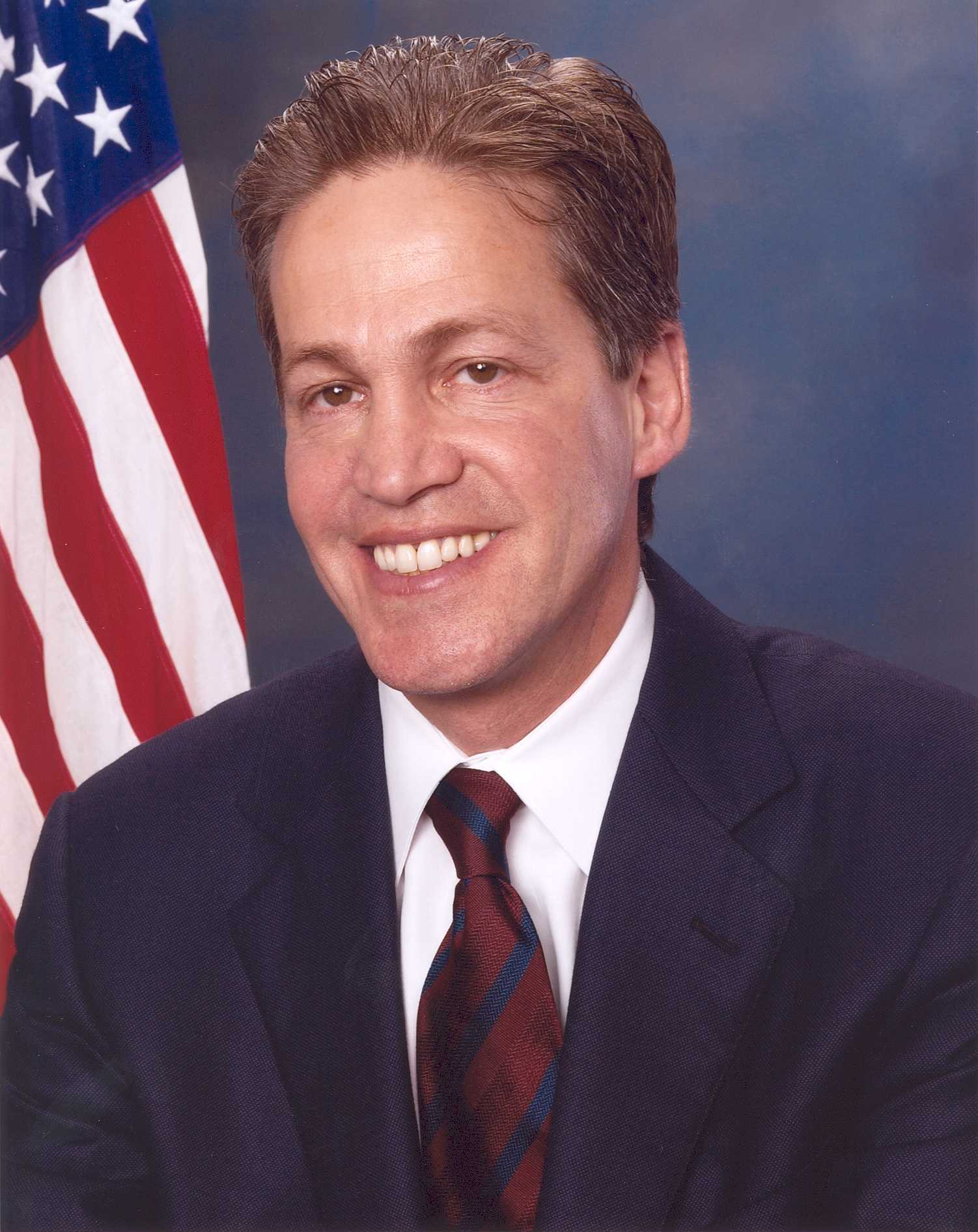

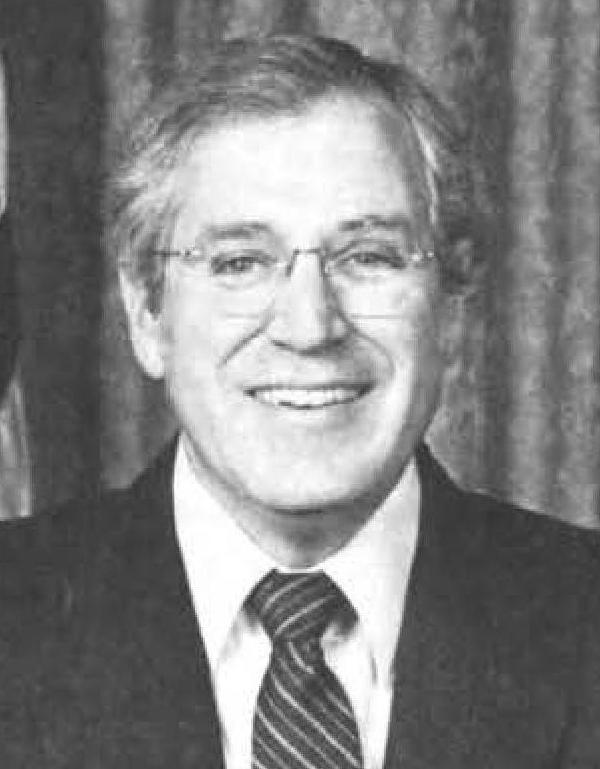
Nominee	Jesse Ventura	Norm Coleman	Skip Humphrey
Party	Reform	Republican	Democratic (DFL)
Running mate	Mae Schunk	Gen Olson	Roger Moe
Popular vote	773,713	717,350	587,528
Percentage	36.99%	34.29%	28.09%
- Ventura: 30–40% 40–50% 50–60% 60–70% 70–80% 80–90% >90% Coleman: 30–40% 40–50% 50–60% 60–70% 70–80% 80–90% >90% Humphrey: 30–40% 40–50% 50–60% 60–70% 70–80% 80–90% >90% Other: 40–50% 60–70% Tie: 30–40% 40–50% 50% No votes
Governor before election
Arne Carlson
Republican
Elected Governor
Jesse Ventura
Reform

The 1998 Minnesota gubernatorial election took place on November 3, 1998. Reform Party candidate Jesse Ventura, the former mayor of Brooklyn Park and a former professional wrestler, won office, defeating Republican St. Paul mayor Norm Coleman and DFL state attorney general Skip Humphrey. He succeeded Republican incumbent Arne Carlson. Ventura's victory as a third-party candidate was considered a historic major upset.

== Nebraska ==
1998 Nebraska gubernatorial election
- November 3, 1998
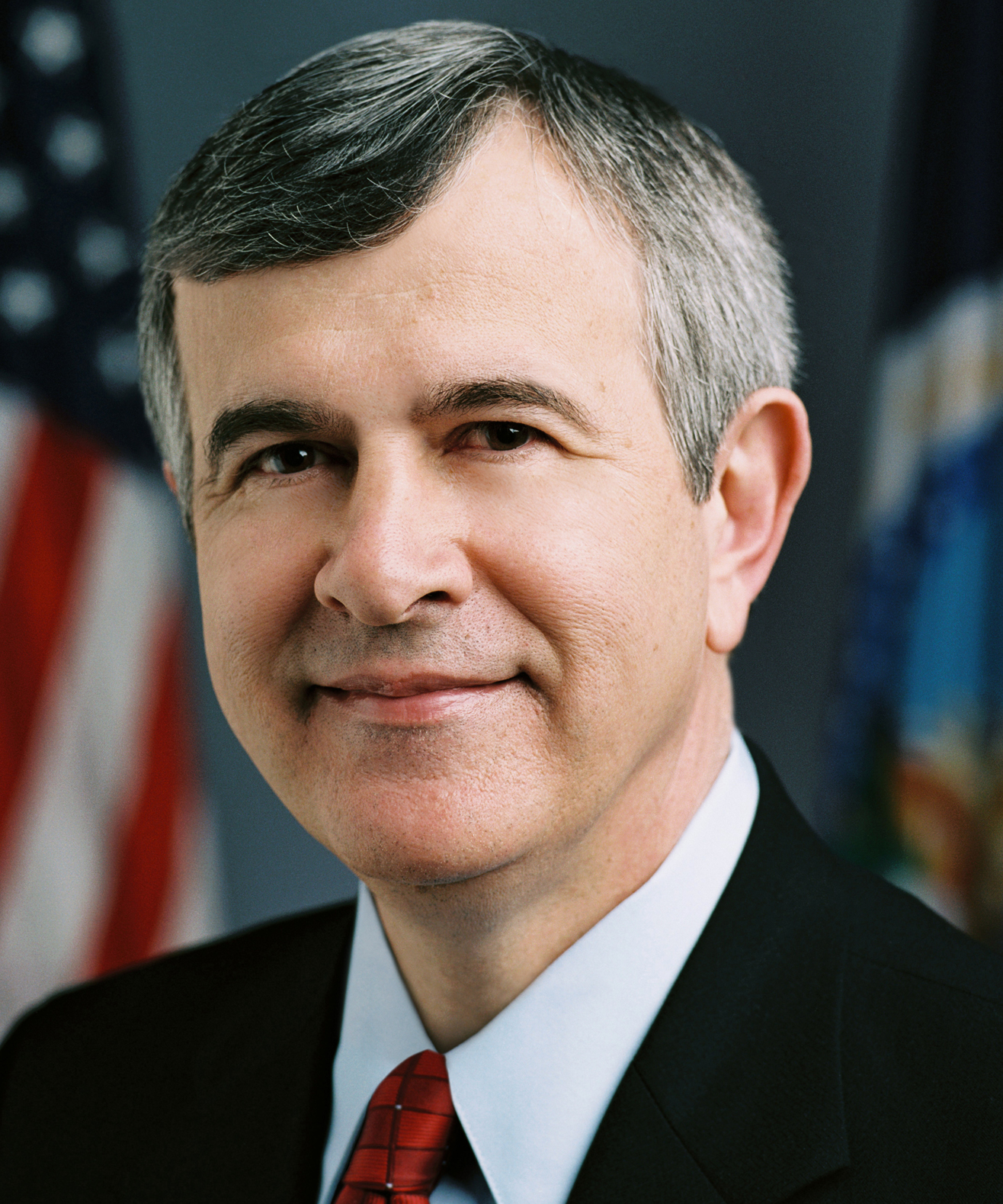

Nominee	Mike Johanns	Bill Hoppner
Party	Republican	Democratic
Running mate	David Maurstad	Pam Bataillon
Popular vote	293,910	250,678
Percentage	53.90%	45.98%
- County results Johanns: 50–60% 60–70% 70–80% Hoppner: 50–60% 60–70% 70–80%
Governor before election
Ben Nelson
Democratic
Elected Governor
Mike Johanns
Republican

The 1998 Nebraska gubernatorial election was held on November 3, 1998. Term limits prevented incumbent Governor Ben Nelson, a Democrat, from seeking a third term in office. Republican nominee Mike Johanns, Mayor of Lincoln, defeated Democratic nominee, attorney Bill Hoppner. As of 2024, this was the last gubernatorial election in Nebraska in which the margin of victory was within single digits. Johanns later served Nebraska in the United States Senate with Nelson from 2009 to 2013.

== Nevada ==
1998 Nevada gubernatorial election
- November 3, 1998
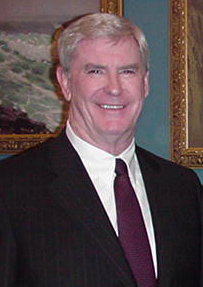

Nominee	Kenny Guinn	Jan Laverty Jones
Party	Republican	Democratic
Popular vote	223,892	182,281
Percentage	51.6%	42.0%
- County results Guinn: 40–50% 50–60% 60–70% 70–80% Jones: 40–50%
Governor before election
Bob Miller
Democratic
Elected Governor
Kenny Guinn
Republican

The 1998 Nevada gubernatorial election occurred on November 3, 1998. Incumbent Democrat Bob Miller was term limited. Republican nominee Kenny Guinn defeated Democratic nominee Jan Laverty Jones to become Governor of Nevada.

This was the first open seat Nevada gubernatorial election since 1978, with Guinn becoming the first Republican elected as Nevada Governor since Robert List was elected in that same election.

== New Hampshire ==
1998 New Hampshire gubernatorial election
- November 3, 1998
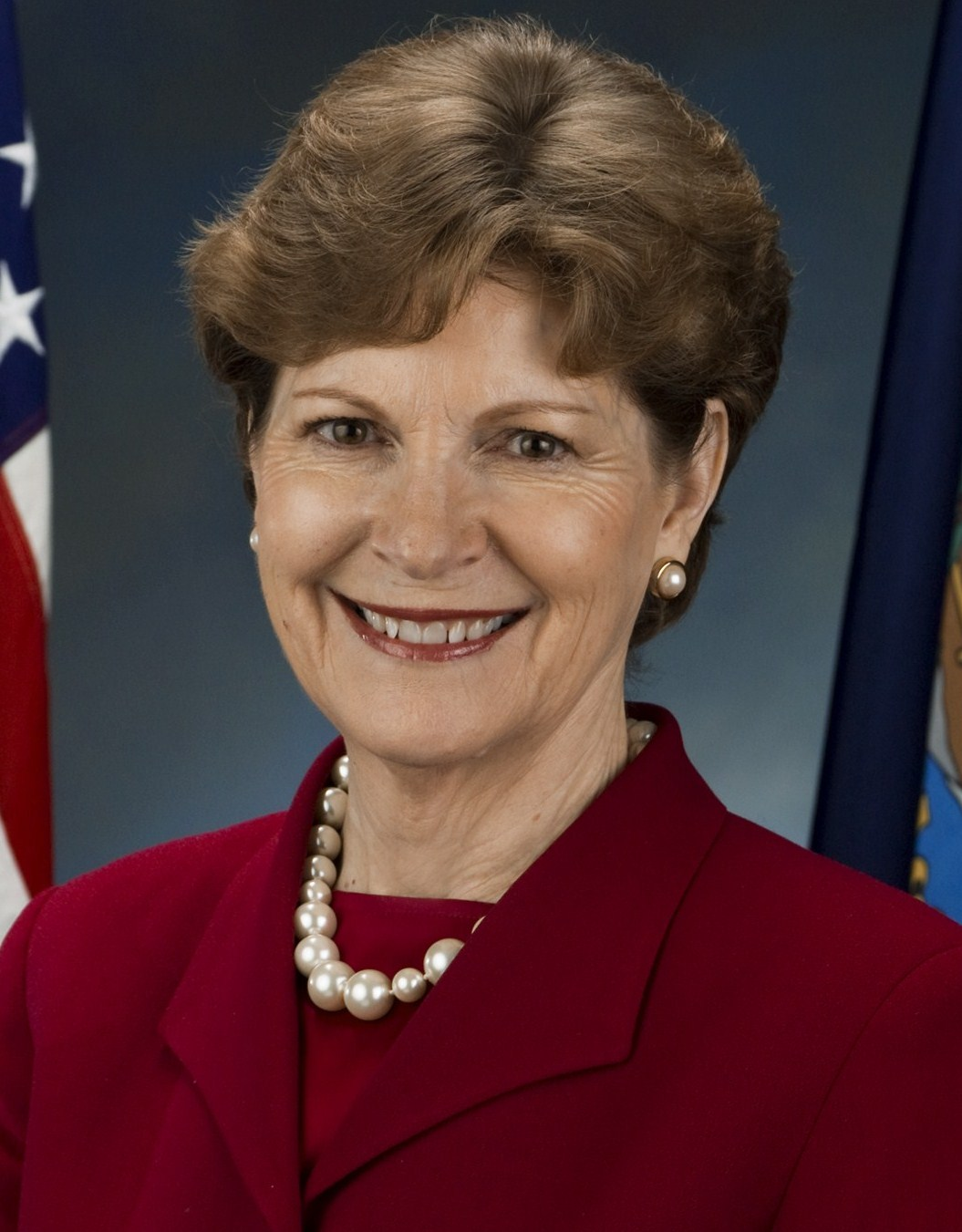

Nominee	Jeanne Shaheen	Jay Lucas
Party	Democratic	Republican
Popular vote	210,769	98,473
Percentage	66.1%	30.9%
- Shaheen: 40–50% 50–60% 60–70% 70–80% 80–90% >90% Lucas: 40–50% 50–60%
Governor before election
Jeanne Shaheen
Democratic
Elected Governor
Jeanne Shaheen
Democratic

The 1998 New Hampshire gubernatorial election took place on November 3, 1998. Former Governor Jeanne Shaheen won re-election. She defeated Jay Lucas, who had defeated Jim Rubens and Emile Beaulieu for the Republican nomination.

== New Mexico ==
1998 New Mexico gubernatorial election
- November 3, 1998
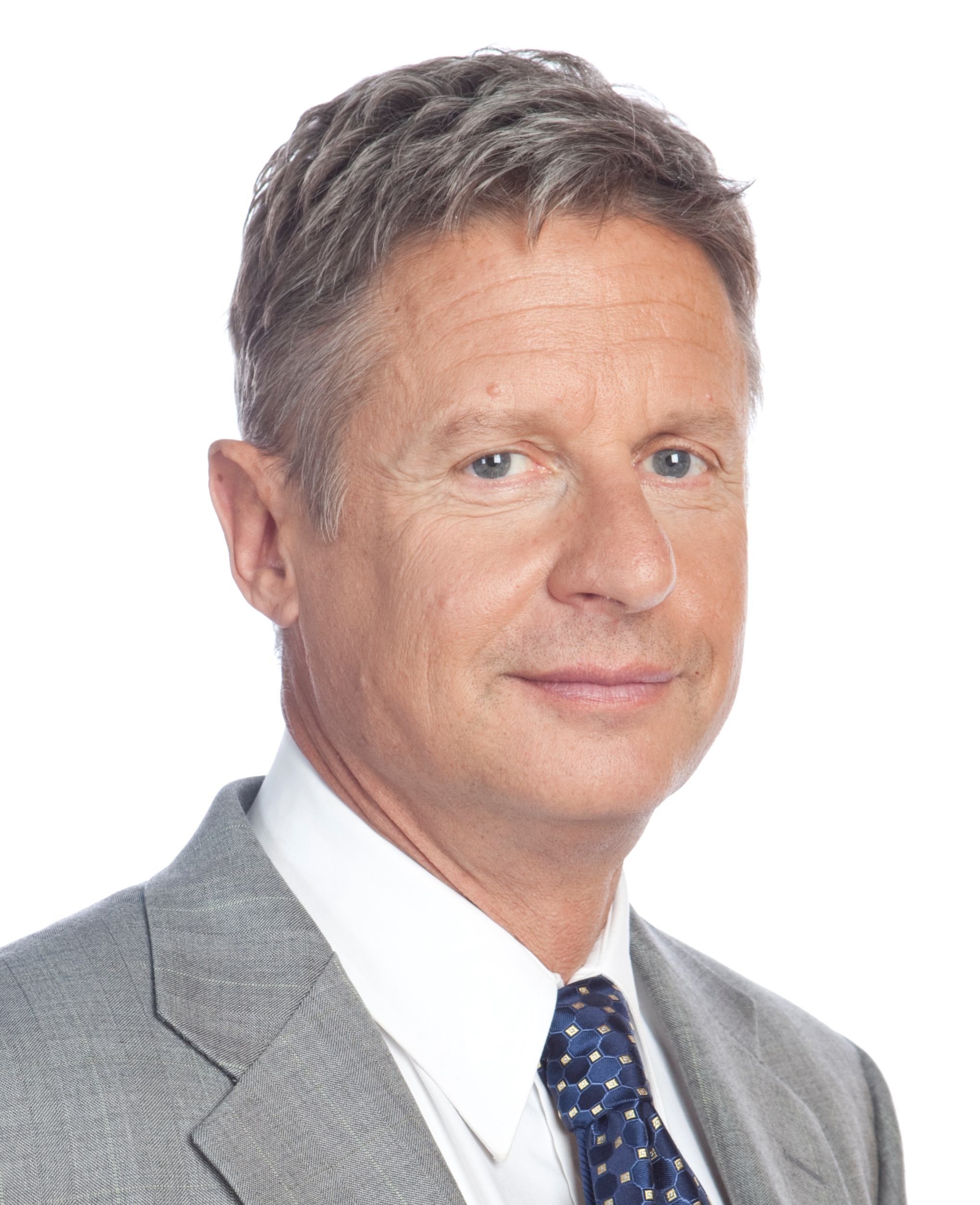

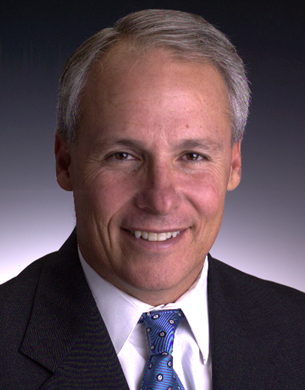
Nominee	Gary Johnson	Martin Chávez
Party	Republican	Democratic
Running mate	Walter Bradley	Diane Denish
Popular vote	271,948	226,755
Percentage	54.53%	45.47%
- County results Johnson: 50–60% 60–70% 70–80% Chávez: 50–60% 60–70% 70–80%
Governor before election
Gary Johnson
Republican
Elected Governor
Gary Johnson
Republican

The 1998 New Mexico gubernatorial election was a contest to elect the next governor of New Mexico. The winner of the election would serve a term from January 1, 1999, until January 1, 2003. Incumbent Republican (now Libertarian) Governor Gary Johnson was re-elected to a second term. As of 2026, this is the last time a non-Hispanic was elected governor of New Mexico.

== New York ==
1998 New York gubernatorial election
- November 3, 1998
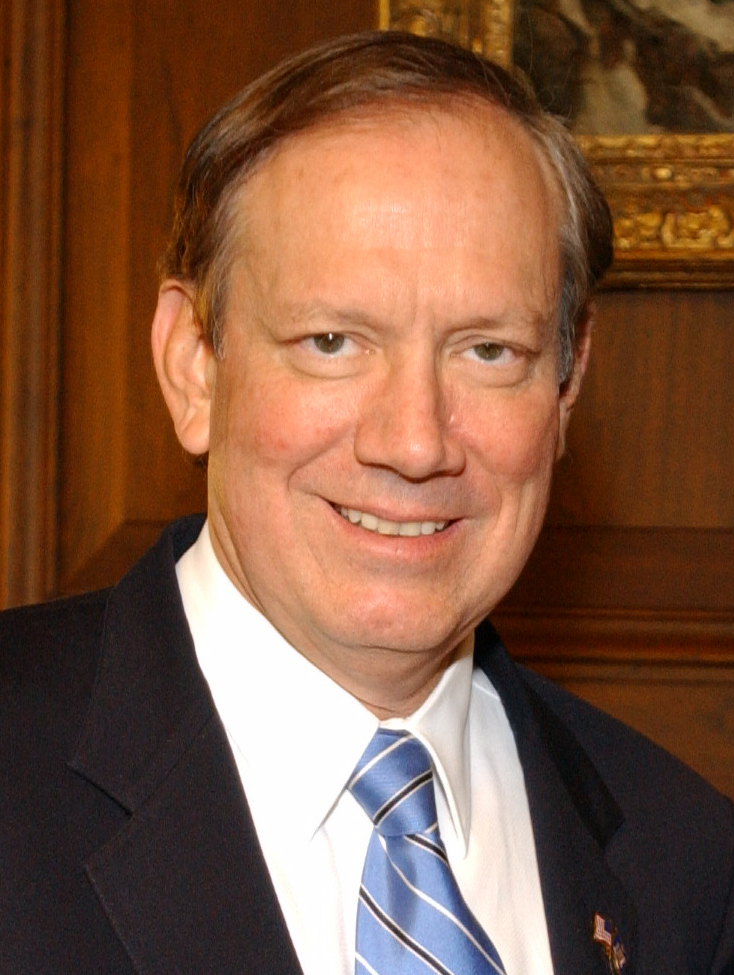

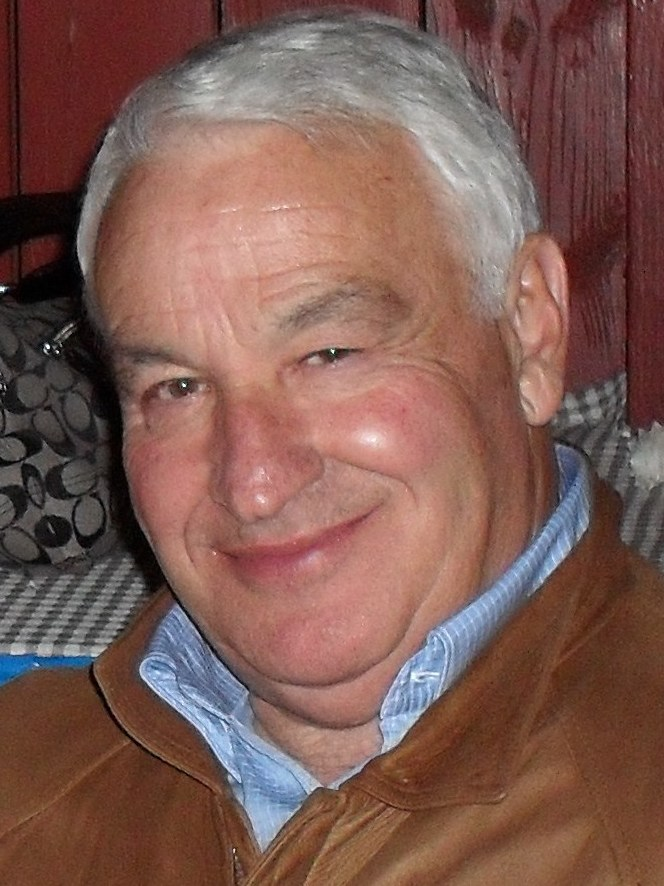
Nominee	George Pataki	Peter Vallone Sr.	Tom Golisano
Party	Republican	Democratic	Independence
Alliance	Conservative	Working Families
Running mate	Mary Donohue	Sandra Frankel	Laureen Oliver
Popular vote	2,571,991	1,570,317	364,056
Percentage	54.32%	33.16%	7.69%
- County results Pataki: 40–50% 50–60% 60–70% 70–80% Vallone: 50–60% 60–70% 70–80%
Governor before election
George Pataki
Republican
Elected Governor
George Pataki
Republican

The 1998 New York gubernatorial election was an election for the state governorship held on November 3, 1998. Incumbent Republican governor George Pataki was re-elected with 54.3% of the vote.

== Ohio ==
1998 Ohio gubernatorial election
- November 3, 1998
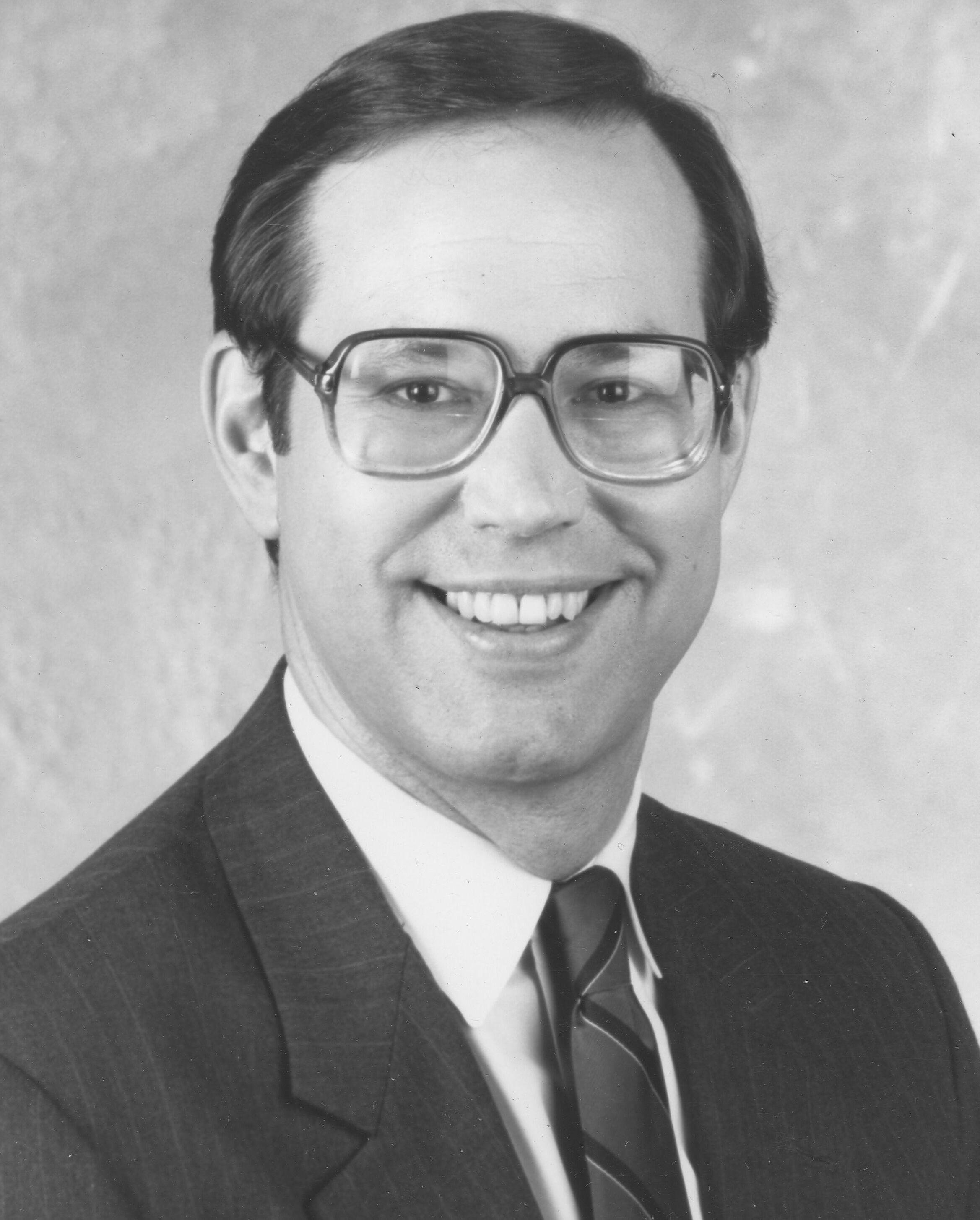

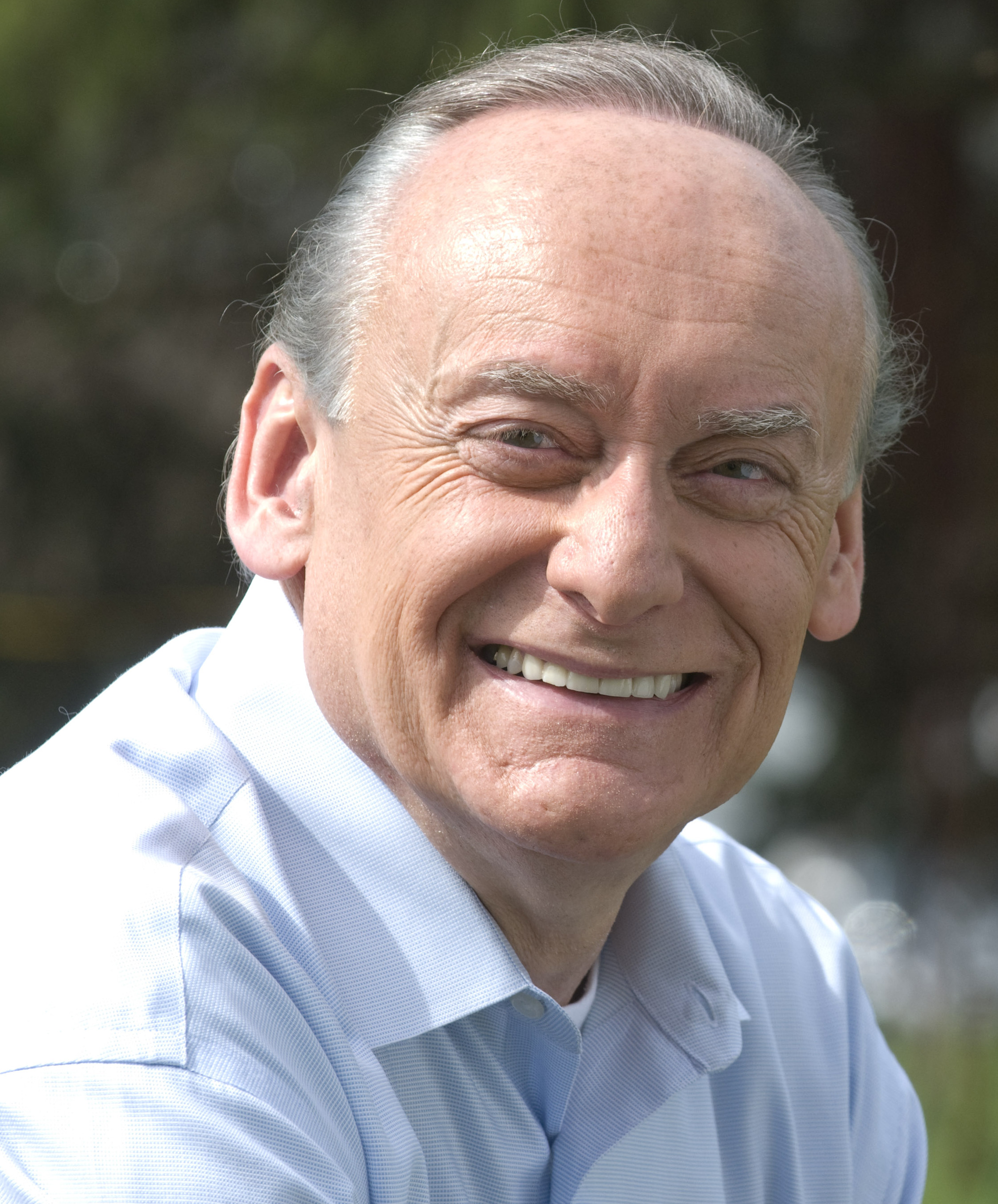
Nominee	Bob Taft	Lee Fisher
Party	Republican	Democratic
Popular vote	1,678,721	1,498,956
Percentage	50.0%	44.6%
- County results Taft: 40–50% 50–60% 60–70% Fisher: 40–50% 50–60%
Governor before election
George Voinovich
Republican
Elected Governor
Bob Taft
Republican

The 1998 Ohio gubernatorial election was held on November 3, 1998. Incumbent Republican Governor of Ohio George Voinovich could not seek a third term as Governor due to term limits, and ran for the United States Senate instead. To replace him, former Attorney General of Ohio Lee Fisher and Ohio Secretary of State Bob Taft won the Democratic and Republican primaries, respectively. Taft and Fisher faced off in a highly competitive general election, and in the end, Taft (a great-grandson of U.S. President and Supreme Court Chief Justice William Howard Taft) beat out Fisher by a narrow margin, making this gubernatorial election one of Ohio's closest.

== Oklahoma ==
1998 Oklahoma gubernatorial election
- November 3, 1998
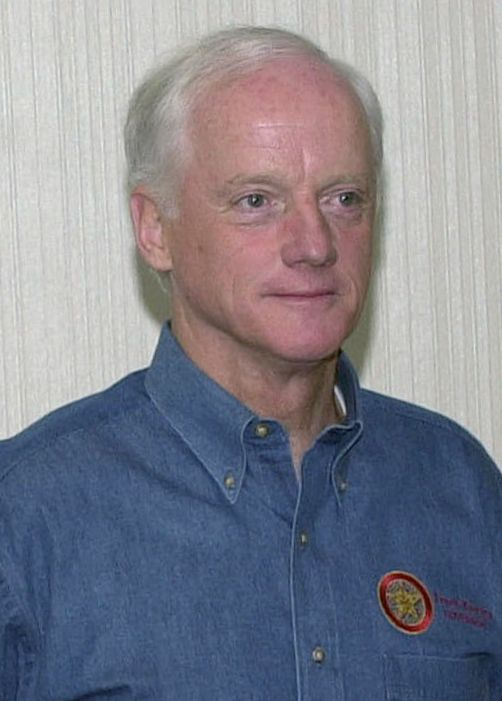

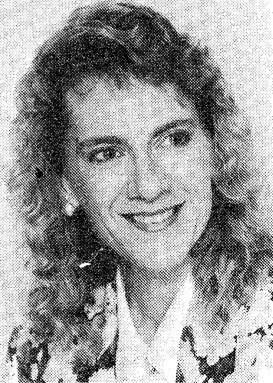
Nominee	Frank Keating	Laura Boyd
Party	Republican	Democratic
Popular vote	505,498	357,552
Percentage	57.9%	40.9%
- County results Keating: 40–50% 50–60% 60–70% 70–80% Boyd: 40–50% 50–60% 60–70%
Governor before election
Frank Keating
Republican
Elected Governor
Frank Keating
Republican

The 1998 Oklahoma gubernatorial election was held on November 3, 1998, and was a race for Governor of Oklahoma. Incumbent Republican Frank Keating won re-election in a landslide against Democratic State Representative Laura Boyd. The Reform Party, the first alternative party to be able to run a candidate for governor in the state since 1970, had Hoppy Heidelberg as its candidate. Heidelberg was removed from a gubernatorial debate that he disrupted after not being allowed to be a participant.

== Oregon ==
1998 Oregon gubernatorial election
- November 3, 1998
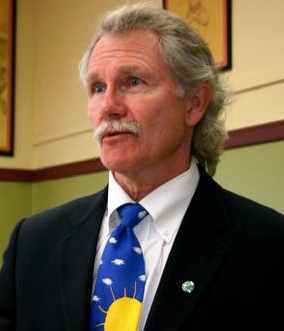

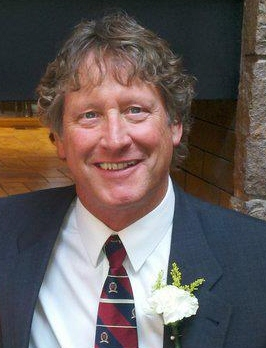
Nominee	John Kitzhaber	Bill Sizemore
Party	Democratic	Republican
Popular vote	717,061	334,001
Percentage	64.4%	30.0%
- County results Kitzhaber: 40–50% 50–60% 60–70% 70–80% Sizemore: 50–60%
Governor before election
John Kitzhaber
Democratic
Elected Governor
John Kitzhaber
Democratic

The 1998 Oregon gubernatorial election took place on November 3, 1998. Democratic nominee John Kitzhaber easily defeated Republican Bill Sizemore to win a second term. Kitzhaber won 35 out of 36 counties, the only county won by Sizemore was Malheur County. This is the only gubernatorial election since 1982 in Oregon in which the margin of victory was in double digits. It is also the most recent election in which any county in Eastern Oregon or Southern Oregon voted for the Democratic nominee, and the most recent gubernatorial election in which a candidate would win while carrying the majority of the state's counties. Sizemore would run again for governor in the 2022 election, but would lose in the Republican primary.

This election was the first time where an incumbent Democratic Governor of Oregon was re-elected since 1906.

== Pennsylvania ==
1998 Pennsylvania gubernatorial election
- November 3, 1998
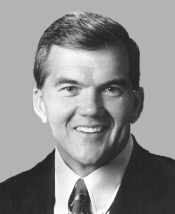

Nominee	Tom Ridge	Ivan Itkin	Peg Luksik
Party	Republican	Democratic	Constitution
Running mate	Mark Schweiker	Marjorie Margolies-Mezvinsky	Jim Clymer
Popular vote	1,736,844	938,745	315,761
Percentage	57.4%	31.0%	10.4%
- Ridge: 30–40% 40–50% 50–60% 60–70% 70–80% 80–90% >90% Itkin: 30–40% 40–50% 50–60% 60–70% 70–80% 80–90% >90% Luksik: 30–40% 40–50% 50–60% 60–70% Tie: 30–40% 40–50% 50–60% No data
Governor before election
Tom Ridge
Republican
Elected Governor
Tom Ridge
Republican

The 1998 Pennsylvania gubernatorial election was held on November 3, 1998. The candidates were incumbent Republican Tom Ridge, Democrat Ivan Itkin, Constitutionalist Peg Luksik and Libertarian Ken Krawchuk. Ridge, a popular moderate, won with 57 percent of the votes cast.

== Rhode Island ==
1998 Rhode Island gubernatorial election
- November 3, 1998
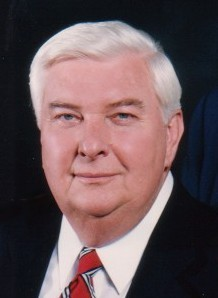

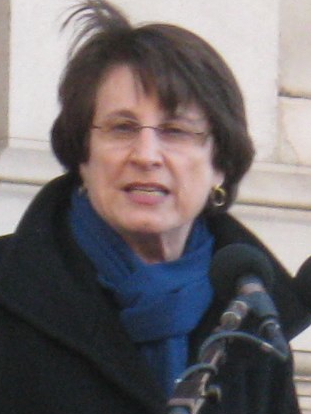

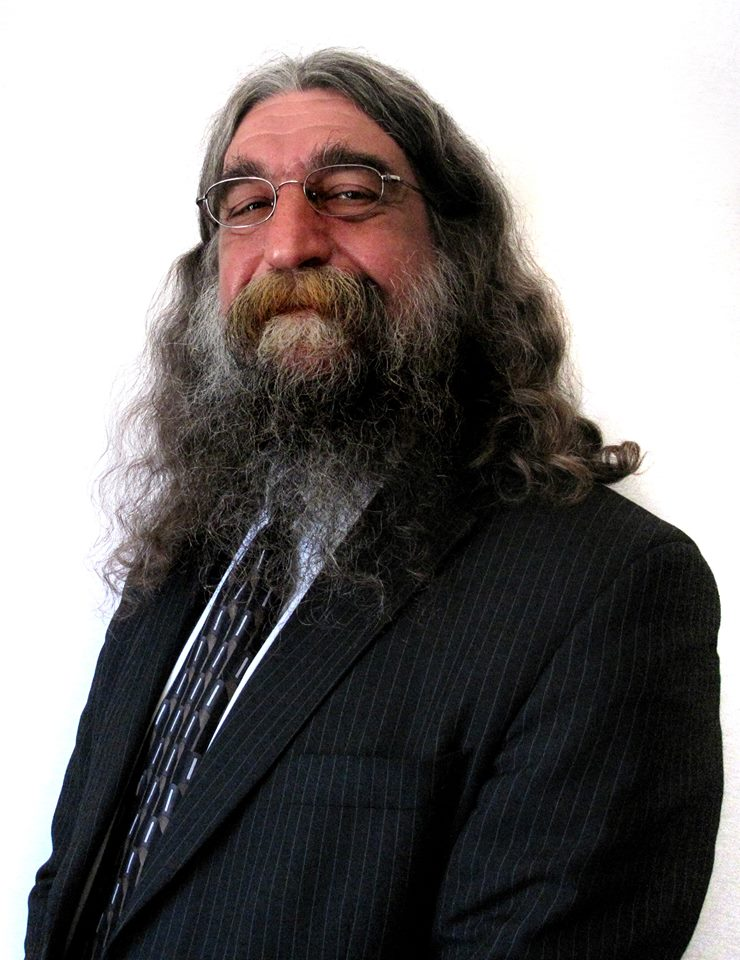
Nominee	Lincoln Almond	Myrth York	Robert J. Healey
Party	Republican	Democratic	Cool Moose
Popular vote	156,180	129,105	19,250
Percentage	51.0%	42.1%	6.3%
- Almond: 40–50% 50–60% 60–70% York: 40–50% 50–60%
Governor before election
Lincoln Almond
Republican
Elected Governor
Lincoln Almond
Republican

The 1998 Rhode Island gubernatorial election took place on November 3, 1998. Incumbent Republican governor Lincoln Almond defeated Democratic nominee Myrth York in a rematch of the 1994 race.

== South Carolina ==
1998 South Carolina gubernatorial election
- November 3, 1998
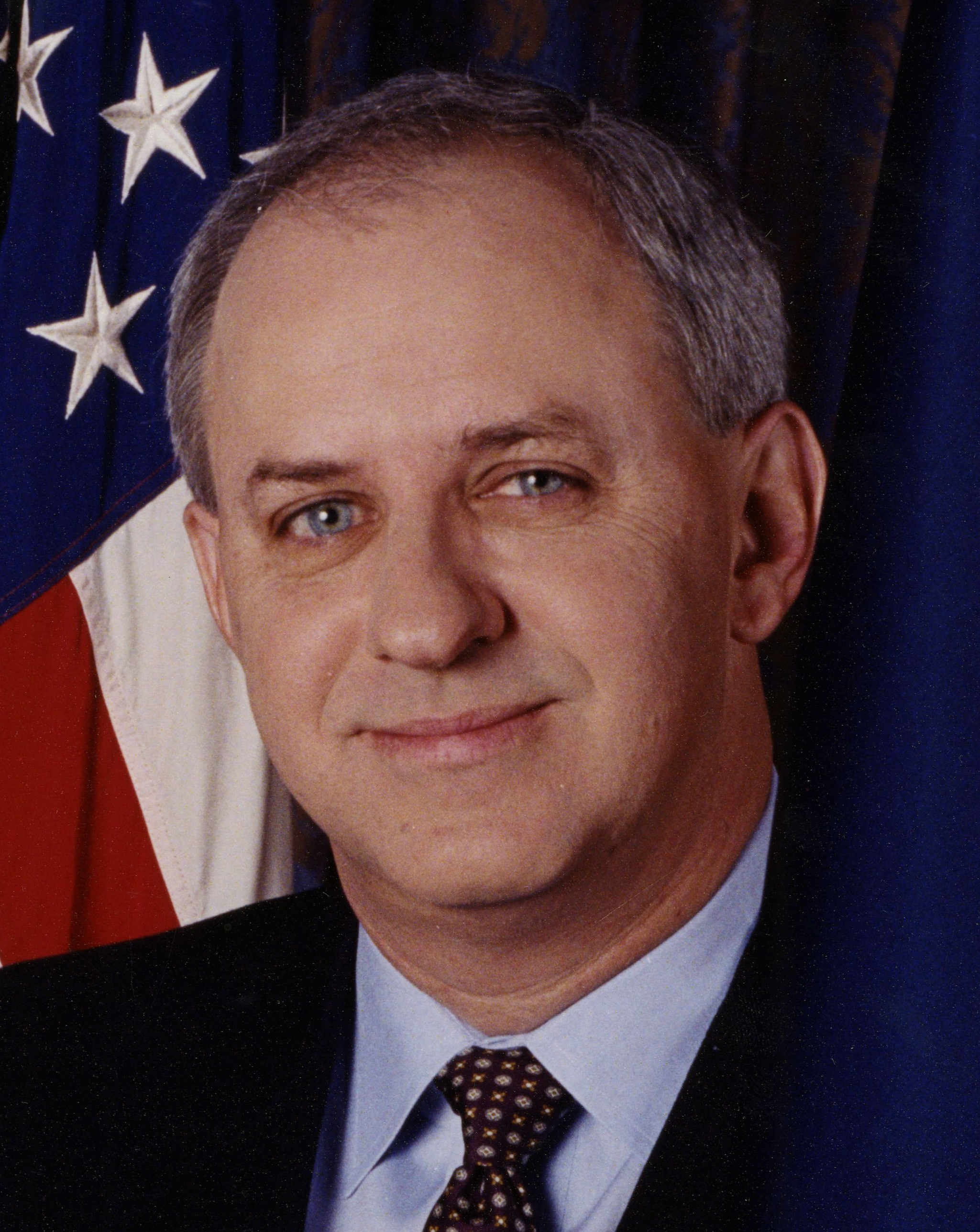

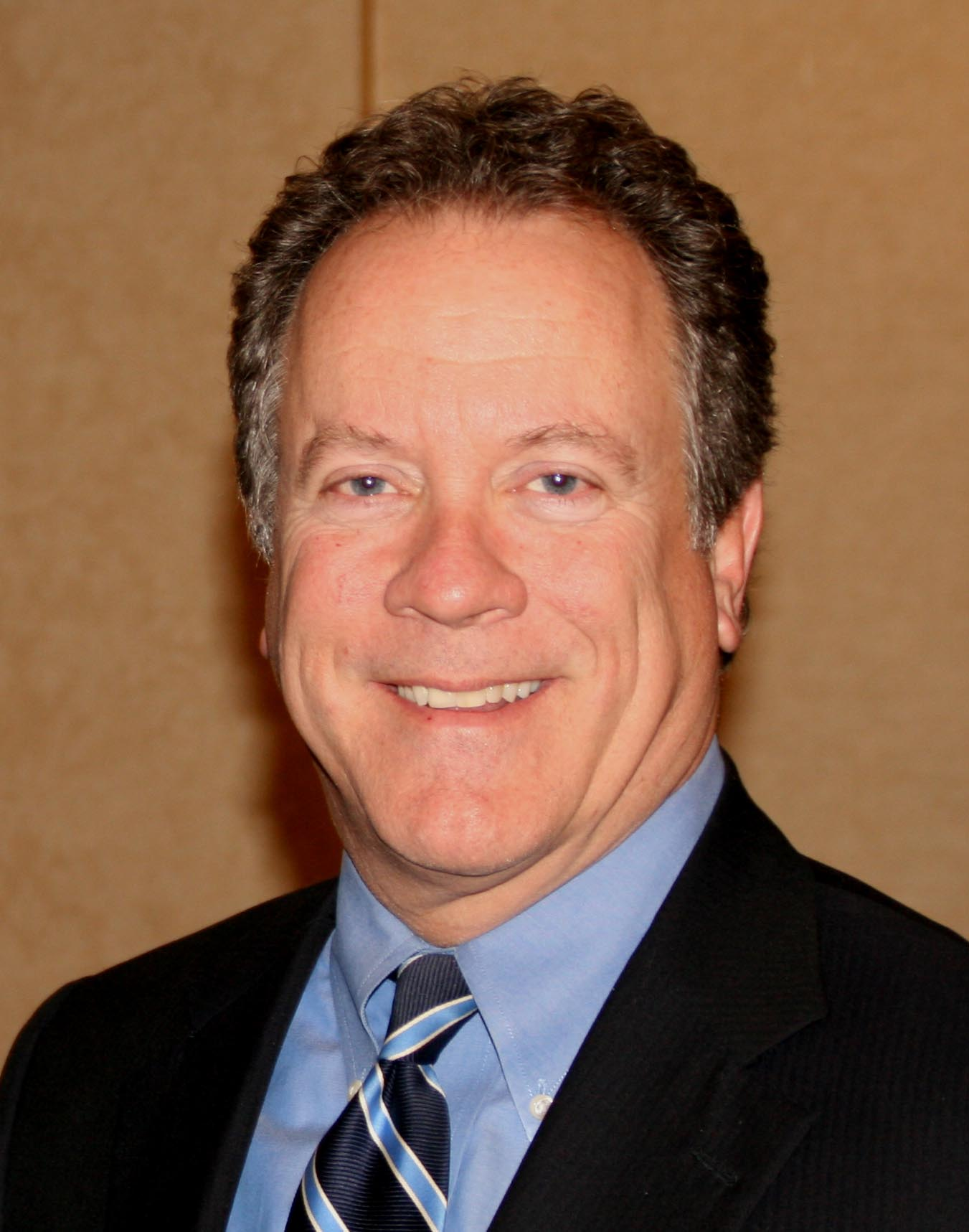
Nominee	Jim Hodges	David Beasley
Party	Democratic	Republican
Popular vote	570,070	484,088
Percentage	53.2%	45.2%
- County results Hodges: 50–60% 60–70% 70–80% Beasley: 40–50% 50–60%
Governor before election
David Beasley
Republican
Elected Governor
Jim Hodges
Democratic

The 1998 South Carolina gubernatorial election was held on November 3, 1998, to select the governor of the state of South Carolina. Jim Hodges, the Democratic nominee, handily defeated Republican governor David Beasley to become the 114th governor of South Carolina. Beasley was the first incumbent governor to be defeated for reelection since Daniel Henry Chamberlain in the disputed election of 1876. As of 2022, this was the last time that a Democrat was elected Governor of South Carolina.

== South Dakota ==
1998 South Dakota gubernatorial election
- November 3, 1998
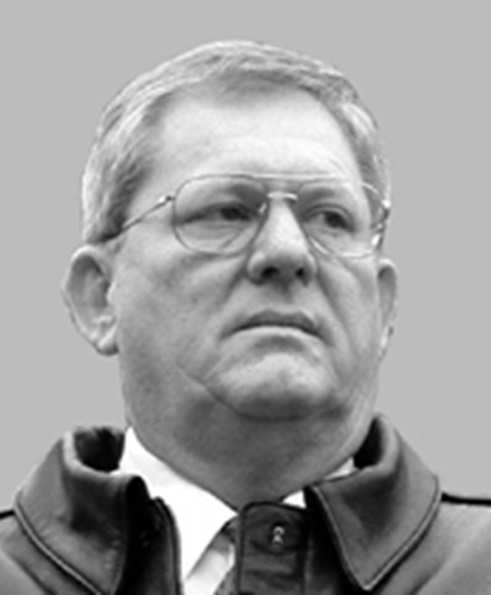

Nominee	Bill Janklow	Bernie Hunhoff
Party	Republican	Democratic
Running mate	Carole Hillard	Elsie Meeks
Popular vote	166,621	85,473
Percentage	64.0%	32.9%
- County results Janklow: 40–50% 50–60% 60–70% 70–80% 80–90% Hunhoff: 50–60% 60–70% 80–90%
Governor before election
Bill Janklow
Republican
Elected Governor
Bill Janklow
Republican

The 1998 South Dakota gubernatorial election took place on November 3, 1998, to elect a Governor of South Dakota. Republican incumbent Bill Janklow was re-elected, defeating Democratic nominee Bernie Hunhoff.

== Tennessee ==
1998 Tennessee gubernatorial election
- November 3, 1998
- Turnout: 32.53% ▼24.09 pp
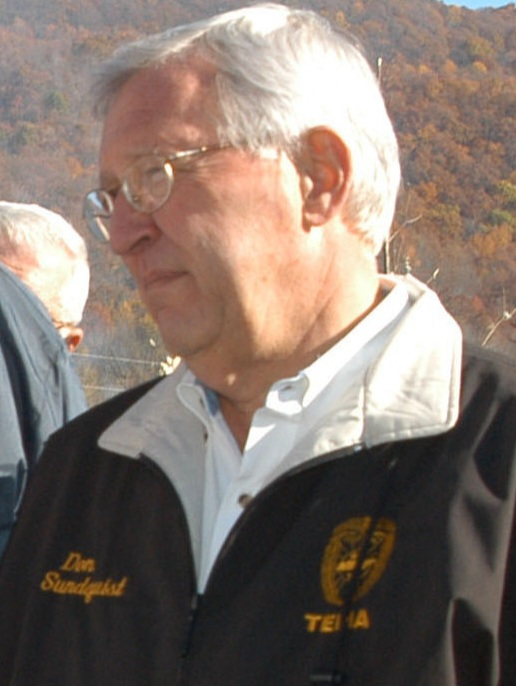

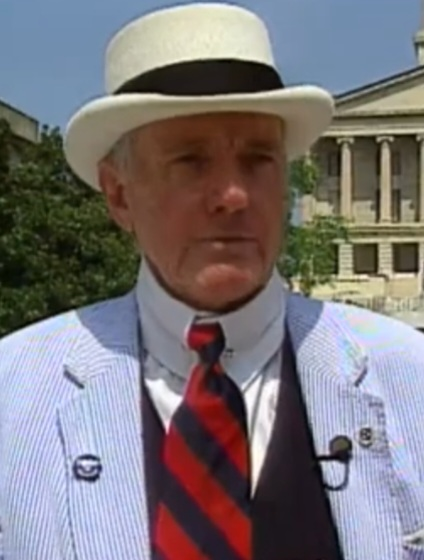
Nominee	Don Sundquist	John Jay Hooker
Party	Republican	Democratic
Popular vote	669,973	287,750
Percentage	68.63%	29.48%
- County results Sundquist: 40–50% 50–60% 60–70% 70–80% 80–90% Hooker: 40–50% 60–70%
Governor before election
Don Sundquist
Republican
Elected Governor
Don Sundquist
Republican

The 1998 Tennessee gubernatorial election took place on November 3, 1998, to elect the governor of Tennessee. Incumbent Republican governor Don Sundquist won re-election, defeating Democratic candidate John Jay Hooker.

Sundquist became the first Republican gubernatorial nominee to get over 60% of the vote since Dewitt Clinton Senter did in 1869. Sundquist carried all but two counties (Lake and Van Buren).

== Texas ==
1998 Texas gubernatorial election
- November 3, 1998
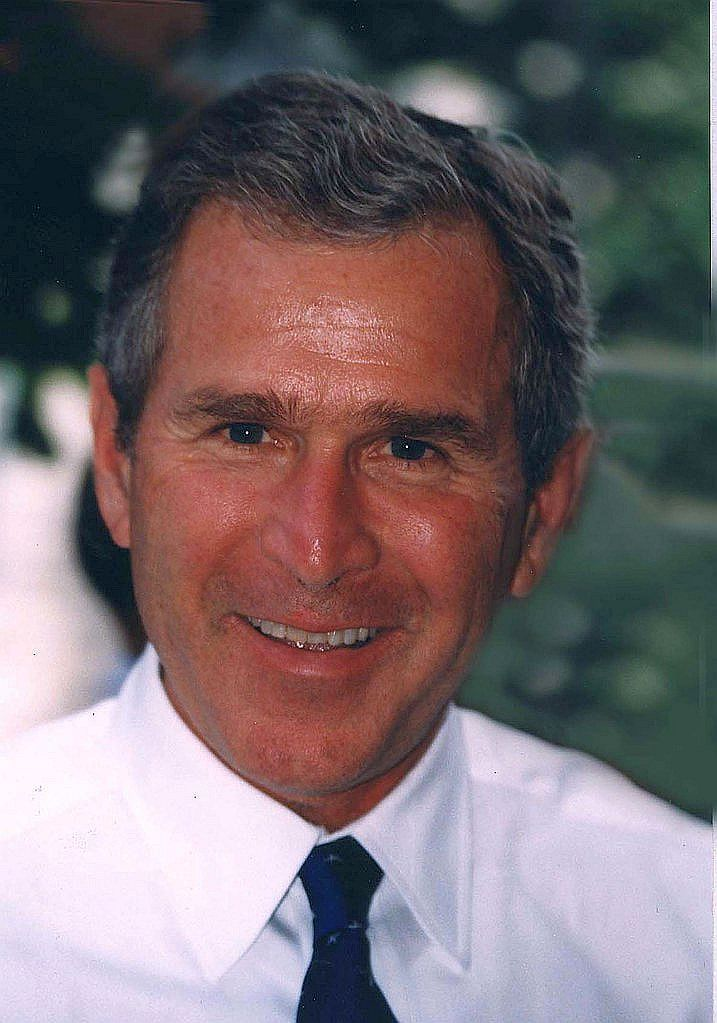

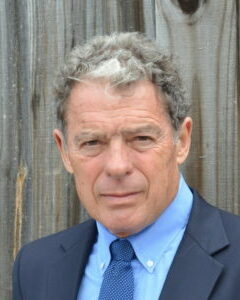
Nominee	George W. Bush	Garry Mauro
Party	Republican	Democratic
Popular vote	2,550,821	1,165,592
Percentage	68.2%	31.2%
- County results Bush: 50–60% 60–70% 70–80% 80–90% >90% Mauro: 40–50% 50–60% 60–70% 70–80%
Governor before election
George W. Bush
Republican
Elected Governor
George W. Bush
Republican

The 1998 Texas gubernatorial election was held on November 3, 1998, to elect the governor of Texas. Incumbent Republican governor George W. Bush was re-elected in a landslide over four-term Democratic Texas Land Commissioner Garry Mauro, winning 68% of the vote to Mauro's 31%. Bush carried 239 counties, while Mauro carried just 15. Exit polls revealed that Bush won 27% of the African-American vote, which was the highest percentage for any Republican statewide candidate, and 49% of the Latino vote. Bush was sworn in for a second term as governor on January 19, 1999.

== Vermont ==
1998 Vermont gubernatorial election
- November 3, 1998
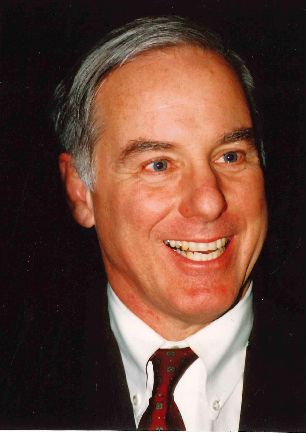

Nominee	Howard Dean	Ruth Dwyer
Party	Democratic	Republican
Popular vote	121,425	89,726
Percentage	55.7%	41.1%
- Dean: 40-50% 50-60% 60-70% 70-80% 80-90% Dwyer: 40-50% 50-60% 60-70% 70-80% 80-90% >90%
Governor before election
Howard Dean
Democratic
Elected Governor
Howard Dean
Democratic

The 1998 Vermont gubernatorial election took place on November 3, 1998. Incumbent Democrat Howard Dean ran successfully for re-election to a fourth full term as Governor of Vermont, defeating Republican candidate Ruth Dwyer.

== Wisconsin ==
1998 Wisconsin gubernatorial election
- November 3, 1998
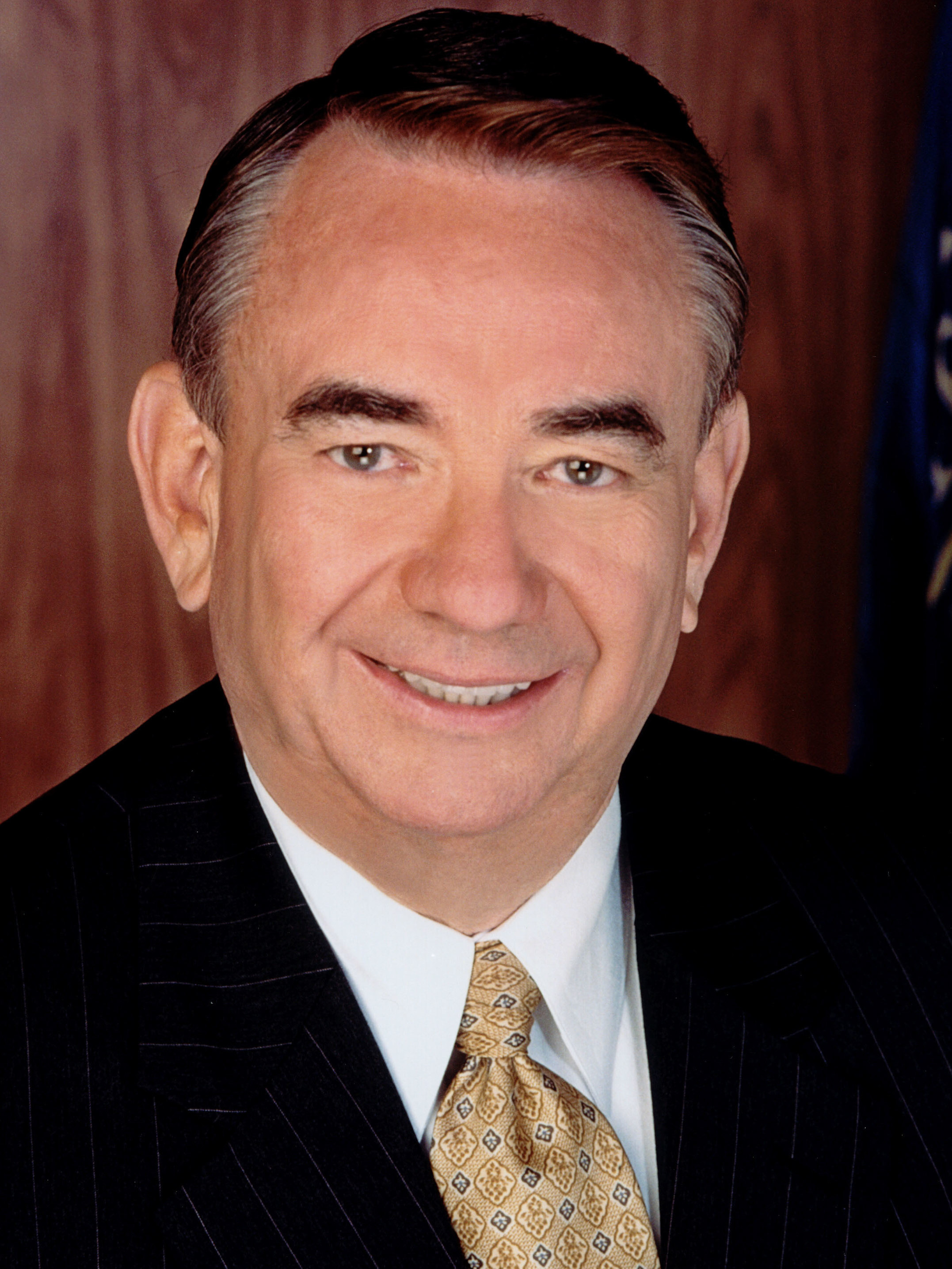

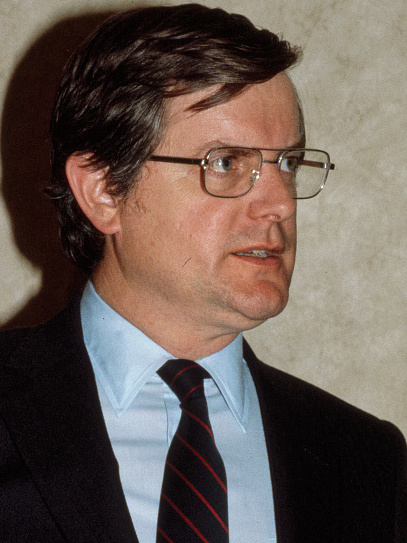
Nominee	Tommy Thompson	Ed Garvey
Party	Republican	Democratic
Running mate	Scott McCallum	Barbara Lawton
Popular vote	1,047,716	679,553
Percentage	59.66%	38.70%
- Thompson: 40–50% 50–60% 60–70% 70–80% 80–90% >90% Garvey: 40–50% 50–60% 60–70% 70–80% 80–90% >90% Tie
Governor before election
Tommy Thompson
Republican
Elected Governor
Tommy Thompson
Republican

The 1998 Wisconsin gubernatorial election was held on November 3, 1998. Incumbent Governor Tommy Thompson won re-election for the third time with nearly 60% of the vote. As of 2022, this is most recent gubernatorial election in which Milwaukee, Rock, Portage, and Iowa counties voted for the Republican candidate, and the most recent where the winner garnered a double digit margin of victory. Gary George unsuccessfully sought the Democratic nomination.

== Wyoming ==
1998 Wyoming gubernatorial election
- November 3, 1998
- Turnout: 73.01% Registered ▼11.50% 38.56% of Total Population ▼5.75%
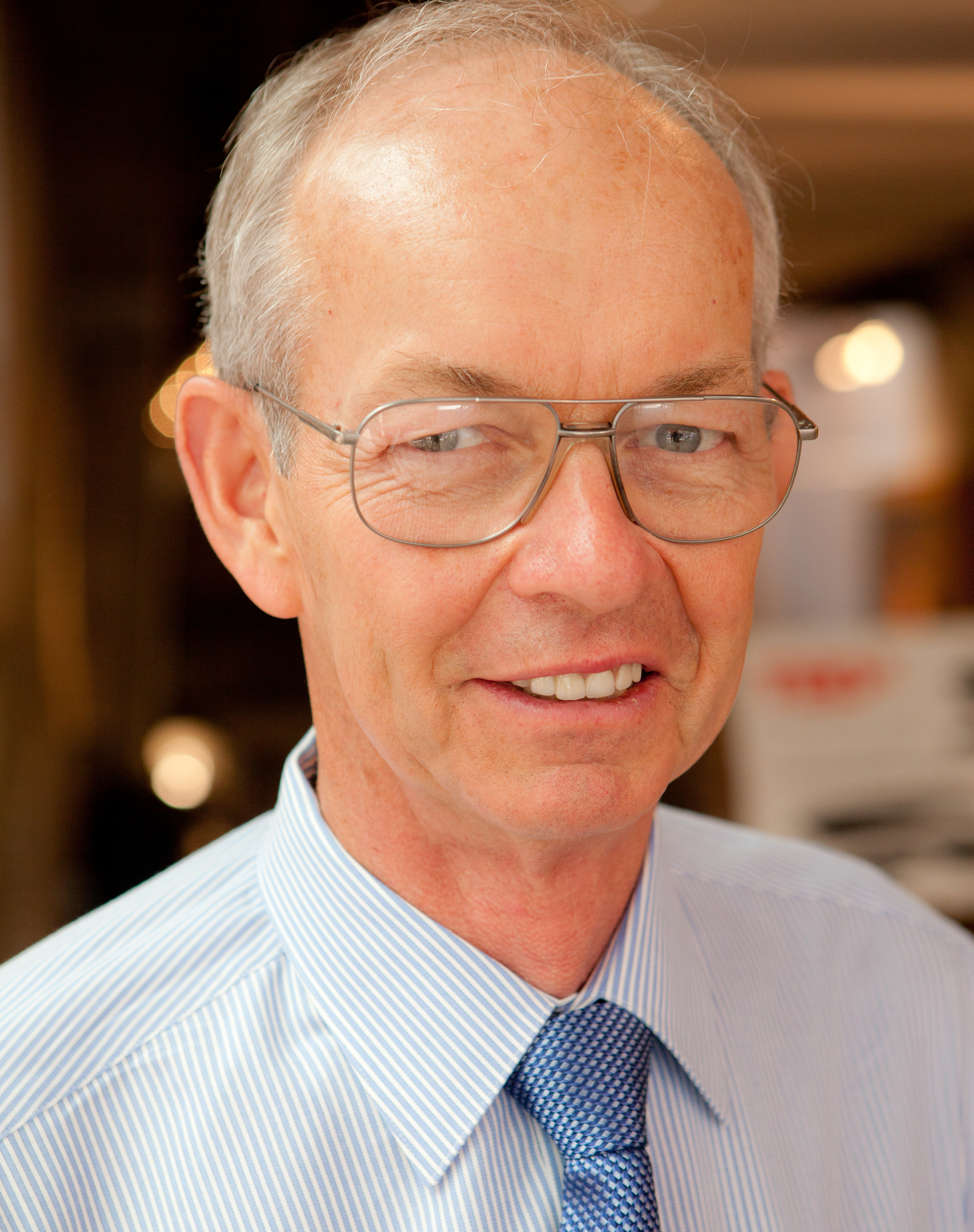

Nominee	Jim Geringer	John Vinich
Party	Republican	Democratic
Popular vote	97,235	70,754
Percentage	55.60%	40.46%
- County results Geringer: 40–50% 50–60% 60–70% 70–80% Vinich: 40–50% 50–60%
Governor before election
Jim Geringer
Republican
Elected Governor
Jim Geringer
Republican

The 1998 Wyoming gubernatorial election took place on November 3, 1998. Incumbent Republican Jim Geringer ran successfully for re-election to a second term as Governor of Wyoming, defeating Democratic nominee John Vinich.

== Territories and federal district ==
=== District of Columbia ===
1998 United States gubernatorial elections
- November 3, 1998
- Turnout: 40.2%
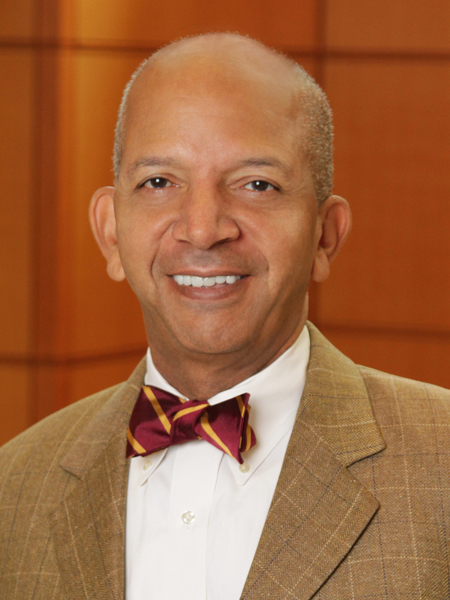

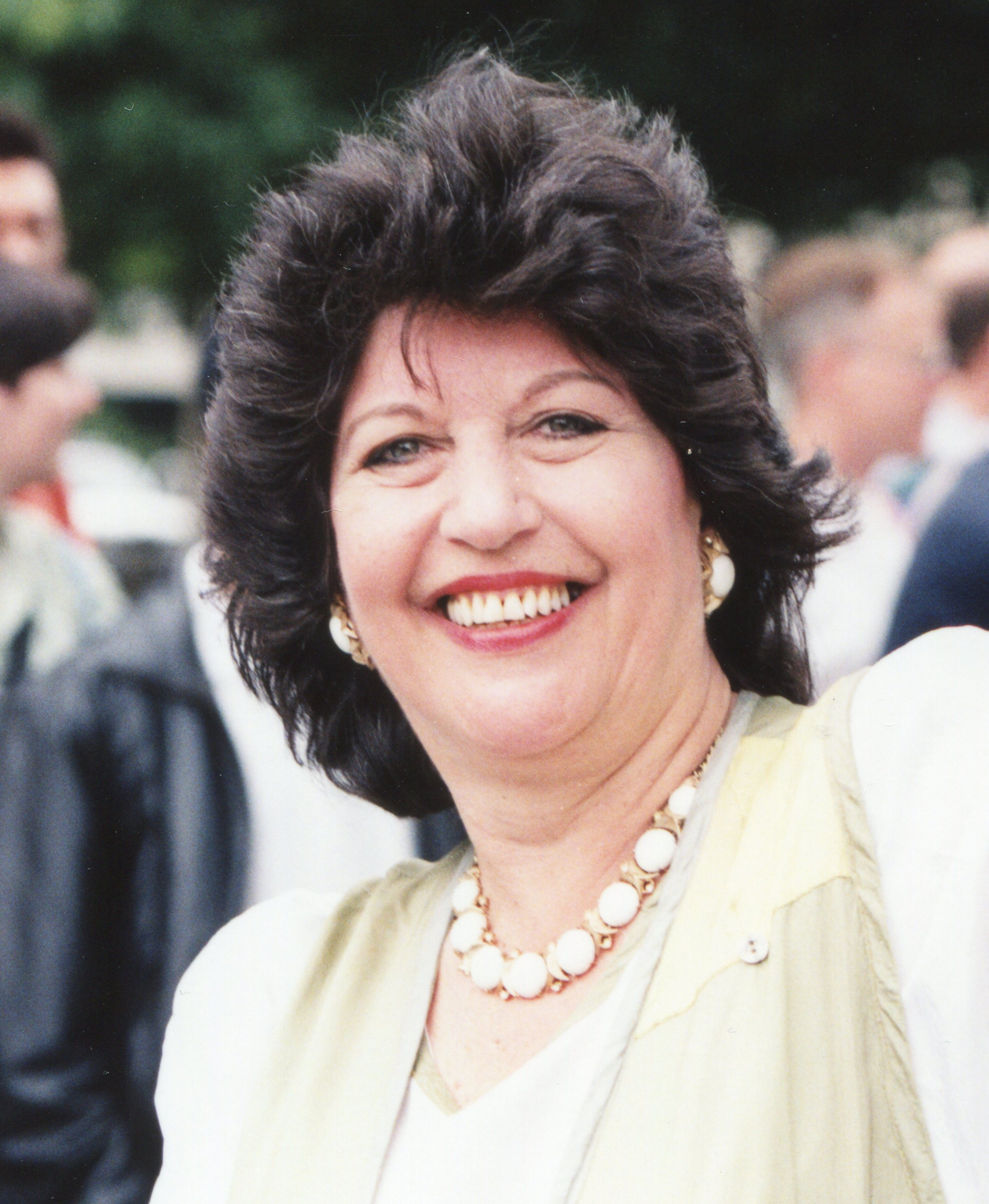
Nominee	Anthony A. Williams	Carol Schwartz
Party	Democratic	Republican
Popular vote	92,504	42,280
Percentage	66.2%	30.2%
Mayor before election
Marion Barry
Democratic
Elected mayor
Anthony A. Williams
Democratic

On November 3, 1998, Washington, D.C., held an election for its mayor. The Democratic candidate, Anthony A. Williams, defeated Republican candidate Carol Schwartz. The parties' primary elections had been held on September 15, 1998.

=== Guam ===
1998 United States gubernatorial elections
- November 3, 1998
- Gubernatorial election
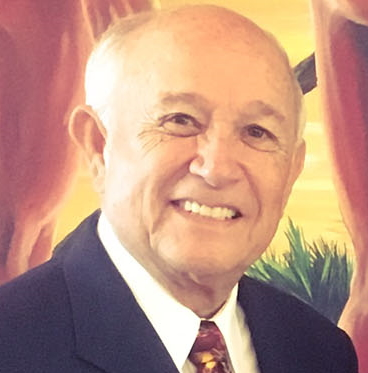

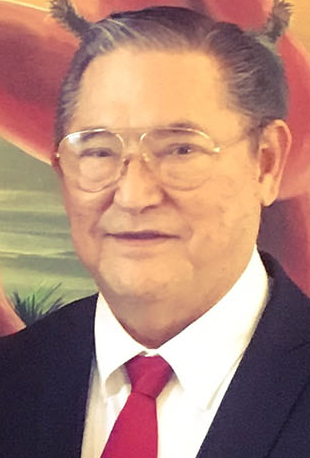
Nominee	Carl Gutierrez	Joseph Franklin Ada
Party	Democratic	Republican
Running mate	Madeleine Bordallo	Felix Perez Camacho
Popular vote	24,250	21,200
Percentage	51.88%	45.35%
Governor before election
Carl Gutierrez
Democratic
Elected Governor
Carl Gutierrez
Democratic

=== U.S. Virgin Islands ===
On election day, 3 November 1998, Democratic nominee Charles Wesley Turnbull won the election by a margin of 5,804 votes against his opponent Governor Roy Schneider, thereby gaining Democratic control over the governorship. Turnbull was sworn in as the 6th Governor of the United States Virgin Islands on 4 January 1999.

Candidate	Running mate	Party	Votes	%
Charles W. Turnbull	Gerard Luz James	Democratic Party	19,795	59.09
Roy Schneider	Juan Centeno	Republican Party	13,640	40.72
Write in			64	0.19
Total			33,499	100.00

== See also ==
- 1998 United States elections
  - 1998 United States Senate elections
  - 1998 United States House of Representatives elections
