= Bernie Hunhoff =

American politician (born 1951)

Member of the South Dakota Senate from the 18th district
- In office January 13, 2015 – January 10, 2017
- Preceded by: Jean Hunhoff
- Succeeded by: Craig Kennedy

Member of the South Dakota House of Representatives from the 18th district
- In office January 13, 2009 – January 13, 2015 Serving with Mike Stevens (2013–2015), Nick Moser (2009–2013)
- Preceded by: Jean Hunhoff
- Succeeded by: Jean Hunhoff

Member of the South Dakota Senate from the 18th district
- In office January 12, 1993 – January 12, 1999
- Preceded by: Elmer Bietz
- Succeeded by: Garry Moore

Personal details
- Born: September 5, 1951 (age 75) Yankton, South Dakota, U.S.
- Party: Democratic
- Education: University of South Dakota, Springfield; Mount Marty College (BA)

Bernie P. Hunhoff (born September 5, 1951) is an American politician and a former Democratic member of the South Dakota Senate representing District 18 from 1993 to 1999 and 2015 to 2017. Hunhoff was also a member of the South Dakota House of Representatives for District 18 from 2009 to 2015. He served as the House minority leader during that time.

Hunhoff is also a writer and journalist. He wrote for the Madison Daily Leader and the Watertown Public Opinion in South Dakota before starting his own weekly paper, the Missouri Valley Observer, in 1978. In 1985 he founded South Dakota Magazine, a bimonthly journal that explores the history, culture and geography of the state. He has also authored and co-authored several books, including Uniquely South Dakota, South Dakota Curiosities and South Dakota's Best Stories.

He married Myrna Mulloy in 1974. They have two children, Katie and Christian, and six grandchildren. They live in Yankton.

== Education ==
Hunhoff attended University of South Dakota-Springfield and earned his BA from Mount Marty College in 1974. He is a 1969 graduate of Yankton High School and attended rural country schools.

== Elections ==
- 2012 When incumbent Republican Representative Nick Moser left the Legislature and left a District 18 seat open, Hunhoff ran in the June 5, 2012 Democratic Primary; in the four-way November 6, 2012 General election, Hunhoff took the first seat with 5,589 votes (31.4%) and Republican nominee Mike Stevens took the second seat ahead of Republican nominee Thomas Stotz and Democratic nominee Charlie Gross.
- 1992 When Senate District 18 incumbent Republican Senator Elmer Bietz left the seat open, Hunhoff ran in the June 2, 1992 Democratic Primary and placed first by eight votes with 1,074 votes (50.2%), including an election recount that did not change the result; and won the November 3, 1992 General election with 6,349 votes (68.94%) against Republican nominee Clifford Groseth.
- 1994 Hunhoff was unopposed for both the June 7, 1994 Democratic Primary and the November 8, 1994 General election, winning with 7,024 votes.
- 1996 Hunhoff was unopposed for both the 1996 Democratic Primary and the November 5, 1996 General election, winning with 7,103 votes.
- 1998 To challenge incumbent Republican Governor of South Dakota Bill Janklow, Hunhoff won the 1998 Democratic Primary, but lost the November 3, 1998 South Dakota Gubernatorial election to Governor Janklow and his running mate Carole Hillard. Hunhoff's running mate was Elsie Meeks, the first Native American woman to be a nominee for statewide office in the state.
- 2008 When House District 18 incumbent Republican Representative Charlotte Gilson left the Legislature and left a District 18 seat open, Hunhoff ran in the June 3, 2008 Democratic Primary; in the four-way November 4, 2008 General election Hunhoff took the first seat with 6,014 votes (34%) and Republican nominee Nick Moser took the second seat ahead of incumbent Democratic Representative and former Senator Garry Moore and Republican nominee Daniel Rupiper.
- 2010 Hunhoff ran in the June 8, 2010 Democratic Primary; in the four-way November 2, 2010 General election, incumbent Republican Representative Moser took the first seat and Hunhoff took the second seat with 4,957 votes (31.9%) ahead of former Representative Charlotte Gilson and fellow Democratic nominee Jay Williams.
- 2014 Hunhoff ran unopposed in the June 3rd, 2014 Democratic Primary. Hunhoff than ran for the District 18 Senate seat, which was held by his sister-in-law Republican Jean Hunhoff. In the November 4, 2014 General election, Hunhoff defeated Republican nominee Matt Stone; Hunhoff won with 4,300 votes.

Party political offices
Preceded by Jim Beddow	Democratic nominee for Governor of South Dakota; 1998	Succeeded by Jim Abbott
