= Nick Moser =

American politician

Member of the South Dakota House of Representatives from the 18th district
- In office January 13, 2009 – January 8, 2013
- Preceded by: Charlotte Gilson; Garry Moore
- Succeeded by: Mike Stevens

Personal details
- Born: April 14, 1983 (age 43)
- Party: Republican

Nick Moser (born April 14, 1983) is an American politician who served in the South Dakota House of Representatives from the 18th district from 2009 to 2013.
