= 1998 South Dakota gubernatorial election =

- November 3, 1998
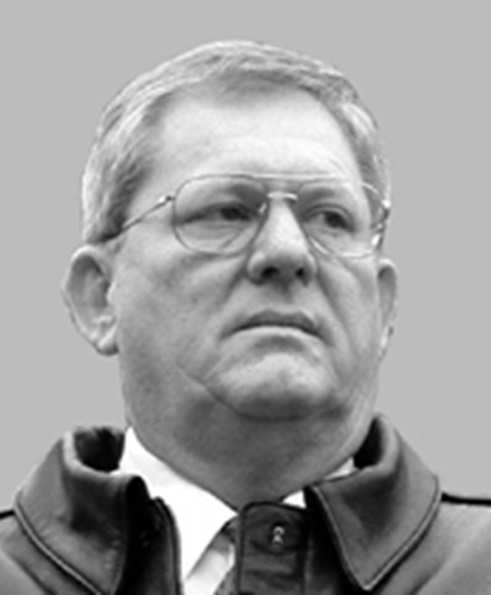

Nominee	Bill Janklow	Bernie Hunhoff
Party	Republican	Democratic
Running mate	Carole Hillard	Elsie Meeks
Popular vote	166,621	85,473
Percentage	64.04%	32.85%
- County results Janklow: 40–50% 50–60% 60–70% 70–80% 80–90% Hunhoff: 50–60% 60–70% 80–90%
Governor before election
Bill Janklow
Republican
Elected Governor
Bill Janklow
Republican

The 1998 South Dakota gubernatorial election took place on November 3, 1998, to elect a Governor of South Dakota. Republican incumbent Bill Janklow was re-elected, defeating Democratic nominee Bernie Hunhoff.

== General election ==
=== Results ===
South Dakota gubernatorial election, 1998
Party	Candidate	Votes	%	±%
Republican	Bill Janklow (incumbent)	166,621	64.04%	+8.68%
Democratic	Bernie Hunhoff	85,473	32.85%	−7.67%
Libertarian	Bob Newland	4,389	1.69%	−2.43%
Independent	Ronald Wieczorek	3,704	1.42%	
Majority		81,148	31.19%	+16.35%
Turnout		260,187		
Republican hold		Swing		
