= Garry Moore (South Dakota politician) =

American politician

Member of the South Dakota House of Representatives from the 18th district
- Incumbent
- Assumed office 2006
- Preceded by: N/A

Personal details
- Born: May 14, 1949 (age 77) Yankton, South Dakota, U.S.
- Party: Democratic
- Spouse: Connie S. Kast
- Occupation: salesman

Garry A. Moore is a Democratic member of the South Dakota House of Representatives, representing the 18th district since 2006. He previously served from 1990 through 1998. He was a member of the South Dakota Senate from 1998 through 2006, serving as Minority Leader.
