= Deaths in January 2017 =

The following is a list of notable deaths in January 2017.

Entries for each day are listed alphabetically by surname. A typical entry lists information in the following sequence:

- Name, age, country of citizenship at birth, subsequent country of citizenship (if applicable), reason for notability, cause of death (if known), and reference.

== January 2017 ==
=== 1 ===
- Sir Tony Atkinson, 72, British economist, multiple myeloma.
- Steve Browne, 52, English footballer (Yeovil Town, Slough Town).
- Hilarion Capucci, 94, Syrian Melkite Catholic hierarch, Patriarchal Vicar of Jerusalem (1965–1974).
- Jewel Plummer Cobb, 92, American biologist.
- Bill Craig, 71, American swimmer, Olympic champion (1964), complications from pneumonia.
- Yvon Dupuis, 90, Canadian politician.
- Peter Farmer, 75, British set designer.
- Karl Gerstner, 86, Swiss typographer.
- Stuart Hamilton, 87, Canadian pianist, vocal coach and broadcaster, prostate cancer.
- Aleksander Jackowski, 96, Polish anthropologist and ethnographer.
- Jean Le Lan, 79, French cyclist.
- Lorne Loomer, 79, Canadian rower, Olympic champion (1956).
- Mel Lopez, 81, Filipino politician.
- Bill Marshall, 77, Canadian film and theatre producer, co-founder of the Toronto International Film Festival, cardiac arrest.
- Lane Meddick, 92, British actor.
- George Miller, 87, Scottish cricketer (national team).
- Memo Morales, 79, Venezuelan singer, heart attack.
- Moruca, 84, Spanish football player and coach (Racing de Santander).
- Yaakov Neeman, 77, Israeli lawyer and politician, Minister of Justice (1996, 2009–2013) and Finance (1997–1998).
- Emmanuel Niyonkuru, 54, Burundian politician, Senator (since 2015) and Minister of Water and Environment (since 2015), shot.
- Derek Parfit, 74, English philosopher (Reasons and Persons).
- Sir Jeremy Reilly, 82, British army general.
- Abis Rizvi, 49, Indian businessman and film producer (Roar: Tigers of the Sundarbans), shot.
- Samuel Schweber, 80, Argentinian chess player, International Master.
- Jeremy Stone, 81, American scientist and arms control activist.
- Aleksander Tšutšelov, 83, Estonian sailor, Olympic silver medalist (1960).
- Talat Tunçalp, 101, Turkish Olympic racing cyclist (1936) and president of the Turkish Cycling Federation (1950–1968).
- Abu Omar al-Turkistani, Chinese Islamist militant.
- Bogdan Tuszyński, 84, Polish sports journalist and reporter (Polskie Radio).
- Sylvester Uphus, 89, American politician, member of the Minnesota House of Representatives (1983–1993).
- Robert Vallée, 94, French mathematician.
- Frederick E. Vollrath, 76, American lieutenant general.
- Alfonso Wong, 93, Hong Kong cartoonist (Old Master Q), organ failure.

=== 2 ===
- Auriel Andrew, 69, Australian country singer.
- René Ballet, 88, French journalist and author.
- John Berger, 90, English art critic and painter.
- Albert Brewer, 88, American politician, Governor of Alabama (1968–1971).
- François Chérèque, 60, French labor unionist (CFDT), leukemia.
- Ian Davison, 79, English cricketer (Nottinghamshire).
- Eric E. Dawson, 79, American politician.
- Barbara Fei, 85, Hong Kong opera singer.
- Richard Gee, 83, Australian federal judge, Family Court (1980–1999), drowning.
- Anthony Goldstone, 72, English pianist.
- Tom Harpur, 87, Canadian classicist, theologian, priest, and journalist.
- Travis Hirschi, 81, American sociologist.
- Richard Machowicz, 51, American Navy SEAL and television host (Future Weapons, Deadliest Warrior), brain cancer.
- Ron Smith, 72, Canadian ice hockey player (New York Rangers).
- Daryl Spencer, 88, American baseball player (New York/San Francisco Giants, St. Louis Cardinals).
- István Tatár, 58, Hungarian Olympic sprinter (1980, 1988).
- Viktor Tsaryov, 85, Russian football player and coach (Dynamo Moscow, Soviet Union national team).
- Jean Vuarnet, 83, French alpine skier, Olympic champion (1960), stroke.
- Brian Widlake, 85, British broadcaster (The Money Programme).

=== 3 ===
- Vida Alves, 88, Brazilian actress (Sua Vida Me Pertence), multiple organ failure.
- Augusto Barreto, 93, Portuguese Olympic fencer (1952).
- Enzo Benedetti, 85, Italian footballer (Palermo).
- Rodney Bennett, 81, British television director (Doctor Who).
- Martin Brandtner, 78, American Marine Corps general.
- Ivo Brešan, 80, Croatian writer (How the War Started on My Island).
- Tony Bromell, 84, Irish politician.
- Mike Buchanan, 84, Canadian ice hockey player (Chicago Blackhawks).
- Kevin Casey, 40, Irish broadcaster (WLR FM), cancer.
- Charles J. Colgan, 90, American politician, member of the Virginia Senate (1976–2016), vascular ailment.
- Murray Crafter, 86, Australian professional golfer.
- J. Dewey Daane, 98, American economist.
- George M. Dennison, 81, American university administrator, President of the University of Montana (1990–2010), non-Hodgkin lymphoma.
- Cecilia González Gómez, 55, Mexican politician, Deputy of Congress (2012–2015), heart attack.
- Russ Gorman, 90, Australian politician, MHR for Chifley (1983–1984) and Greenway (1984–1996).
- Edward P. Kirby, 88, American politician.
- Shigeru Kōyama, 87, Japanese actor (Samurai Rebellion, Black Rain, Beyond Outrage), complications from pneumonia.
- Gilberto Martínez, 82, Colombian Olympian
- Rolf Noskwith, 97, German-born British businessman and codebreaker (World War II).
- Peter Pollen, 89, Canadian politician, Mayor of Victoria, British Columbia (1971–1975, 1981–1985).
- H. S. Mahadeva Prasad, 58, Indian politician, MLA (since 1994), heart attack.
- John W. Slaby, 82, American politician.
- Rosemary Stevenson, 80, American baseball player (Grand Rapids Chicks).
- Alan Surgal, 100, American screenwriter (Mickey One).
- Igor Volk, 79, Ukrainian-born Russian cosmonaut and test pilot (Soyuz T-12).

=== 4 ===
- Hisham Al-Otaibi, 70, Kuwaiti politician, Minister of Finance (1998–1999).
- LeRoy G. Bernstein, 86, American politician.
- Heinz Billing, 102, German physicist and computer scientist.
- William J. Cason, 92, American politician, member of the Missouri Senate (1960–1976).
- John Cummings, 73, British politician, MP for Easington (1987–2010), lung cancer.
- Willie Evans, 79, American football player (University at Buffalo).
- Abdul Halim Jaffer Khan, 89, Indian sitar player and composer, cardiac arrest.
- Bruce Hugo, 71, American politician, member of the Oregon House of Representatives (1983–1993).
- Bade Fateh Ali Khan, 82, Pakistani singer, lung disease.
- Sandra Landy, 78, British contract bridge player, meningitis.
- Carl E. Misch, 69, American prosthodontist, cancer.
- Jordi Pagans i Monsalvatje, 84, Spanish painter.
- Ezio Pascutti, 79, Italian footballer (Bologna).
- Art Pennington, 93, American baseball player (Chicago American Giants, Birmingham Black Barons).
- Georges Prêtre, 92, French orchestral and opera conductor.
- Lois Rice, 83, American business executive.
- Milt Schmidt, 98, Canadian Hall of Fame ice hockey player, coach and general manager (Boston Bruins, Washington Capitals), stroke.
- Anna Senkoro, 54, Tanzanian politician.
- Gabriel Tanginye, 66, South Sudanese rebel leader, killed in Civil War.
- Vlastimir Trajković, 69, Serbian composer.
- Anthony Tu Shihua, 97, Chinese prelate from Chinese Patriotic Catholic Association, illegitimate Bishop of Hanyang (since 1959).
- Veronica Steele, 69, Irish cheesemaker.
- Sir Douglas Wass, 93, British civil servant, Permanent Secretary to HM Treasury (1974–1983).
- Paul Went, 67, English footballer (Charlton Athletic, Leyton Orient, Portsmouth).
- Wayne Westner, 55, South African golfer, suicide by gunshot.

=== 5 ===
- David Alexander, 90, British Royal Marines general.
- Graham Atkinson, 73, English footballer (Oxford United), cancer.
- Spartak Belyaev, 93, Russian theoretical physicist.
- Leonardo Benevolo, 93, Italian architect and city planner.
- Géori Boué, 98, French operatic soprano.
- Luc Coene, 69, Belgian economist.
- Tullio De Mauro, 84, Italian linguist and politician, Minister of Education (2000–2001).
- Paul Goble, 83, English-born American author and illustrator (Tipi: Home of the Nomadic Buffalo Hunters, The Girl Who Loved Wild Horses), Parkinson's disease.
- Gangmumei Kamei, 77, Indian academic and politician.
- Gerald E. McClearn, 89, American behavior geneticist.
- Frank Murphy, 69, Irish Olympic middle-distance runner (1968, 1972), European Championship silver medalist (1969).
- Alfonso Humberto Robles Cota, 85, Mexican Roman Catholic prelate, Bishop of Tepic (1981–2008).
- Stanley Russ, 86, American politician, member of the Arkansas Senate (1975–2001), myeloid leukemia.
- Jorge Sanguinetti, 82, Uruguayan politician, Minister of Transport (1985–1989).
- Jill Saward, 51, British sexual assault awareness campaigner, subarachnoid haemorrhage.
- Marzio Strassoldo, 77, Italian politician, President of the Province of Udine (2001–2007).
- Rafiq Subaie, 86, Syrian actor, writer and director.
- Harry Taylor, 81, English footballer (Newcastle United).
- Christopher Weeramantry, 90, Sri Lankan judge, vice-president of the International Court of Justice (1997–2000).
- Bill West (racing driver), 89, American racing driver.
- Peter Weston, 72, British science fiction fanzine editor, cancer.
- Kurt Wigartz, 83, Swedish Olympic gymnast (1952, 1956, 1960).
- John Wightman, 78, American politician, Mayor of Lexington, Nebraska (1992–1995), member of the Nebraska Legislature (2007–2015).

=== 6 ===
- Yaron Ben-Dov, 46, Israeli footballer (Ironi Rishon LeZion, Maccabi Netanya, Hapoel Tel Aviv).
- Audrey Grevious, 86, American civil rights activist.
- Awad Moukhtar Halloudah, 85, Egyptian Olympic swimmer.
- John Hubbard, 85, American-born British artist.
- Greg Jelks, 55, American-Australian Olympic baseball player (2000), (Philadelphia Phillies).
- Kosei Kamo, 84, Japanese tennis player, winner of the 1955 U.S. Open, heart attack.
- Una Kroll, 91, British nun and Anglican priest.
- Les Lazarowitz, 75, American sound mixer (Taxi Driver, Raging Bull, Groundhog Day), cancer.
- Joseba Leizaola, 86, Spanish politician, President of the Basque Parliament (1990–1998).
- Octavio Lepage, 93, Venezuelan politician, Acting President (1993).
- Ivar A. Mjør, 83, Norwegian dental researcher.
- Ramón Martínez Pérez, 87, Spanish footballer (Sevilla, Granada, national team).
- Bayezid Osman, 92, Turkish royal, 44th Head of the Imperial House of Osman (since 2009).
- Ghaith Pharaon, 76, Saudi businessman.
- Ricardo Piglia, 75, Argentine author, amyotrophic lateral sclerosis.
- Sylvester Potts, 78, American singer and composer (The Contours).
- Om Puri, 66, Indian actor (Ardh Satya, City of Joy, East Is East), heart attack.
- Bob Sadowski, 79, American baseball player (Los Angeles Angels, Chicago White Sox).
- Tilikum, 35, American-held orca, subject of Blackfish, bacterial infection.
- Valerij Verhušin, 56, Macedonian Olympic wrestler.
- Gavin Whittaker, 46, Australian rugby league footballer (Canterbury Bulldogs, Gold Coast Chargers), stomach cancer.
- Francine York, 80, American actress (Days of Our Lives, Batman, The Family Man), cancer.

=== 7 ===
- Sadie Allen, 86–87, Welsh artist.
- Cheick Fantamady Camara, 57, Guinean film director (Il va pleuvoir sur Conakry).
- Bill Champion, 69, American baseball player (Milwaukee Brewers, Philadelphia Phillies).
- Lucina da Costa Gomez-Matheeuws, 87, Dutch Antillean politician, Prime Minister of the Netherlands Antilles (1977).
- Kay Cuthbert, 91, British Olympic diver (1948).
- John Deely, 74, American philosopher, cancer.
- Ramanuja Devanathan, 57, Indian Sanskrit scholar.
- Refik Erduran, 88, Turkish playwright, columnist and writer.
- Carlos Fernández Gondín, 78, Cuban politician, Minister of the Interior (since 2015).
- Stein Gauslaa, 68, Norwegian journalist and civil servant.
- Marvin Gettleman, 83, American historian.
- Nat Hentoff, 91, American political philosopher, columnist and music critic (The Village Voice, Down Beat).
- Eddie Kamae, 89, American ukuleleist (Sons of Hawaii).
- Jerzy Kossela, 74, Polish guitarist and vocalist (Niebiesko-Czarni, Czerwone Gitary).
- Lelio Lagorio, 91, Italian politician, President of Tuscany (1970–1978), Minister of Defence (1980–1983) and Sport and Spectacles (1983–1986).
- Abdul Hafeez Lakho, 87, Pakistani lawyer.
- Betty Lasky, 94, American film historian, pneumonia.
- Mildred Meacham, 92, American baseball player (AAGBPL).
- Barbara Mitcalfe, 88, New Zealand conservationist and botanist.
- Mike Ovey, 58, British Anglican clergyman and academic administrator (Oak Hill College), heart attack.
- Roger Parsons, 90, British chemist.
- Einfrid Perstølen, 99, Norwegian psychiatrist and language proponent.
- Dan Porter, 86, American baseball player (Washington Senators).
- Murray Ryan, 94, American politician, member of the New Mexico House of Representatives (1969–1999).
- Michael Scanlan, 85, American Roman Catholic priest and academic administrator.
- Sir Bruce Slane, 85, New Zealand public servant, Privacy Commissioner (1993–2003).
- Mário Soares, 92, Portuguese politician, President (1986–1996) and Prime Minister (1976–1978, 1983–1985).
- Lech Trzeciakowski, 85, Polish historian.
- Alice Whitty, 82, Canadian Olympic high jumper (1956).
- Laurel Woodcock, 56, Canadian artist and academic.

=== 8 ===
- Dominique Appia, 90, Swiss painter.
- Buddy Bregman, 86, American arranger, producer, and composer.
- Jackie Brown, 73, American baseball player and coach (Texas Rangers).
- James C. Christensen, 74, American fantasy artist, cancer.
- Colin Cameron Davies, 92, Spanish-born Kenyan Roman Catholic prelate, Bishop of Ngong (1964–2002).
- Jerry DeLucca, 80, American football player (Boston Patriots, Buffalo Bills, Philadelphia Eagles).
- Dicky van Ekris, 84, Dutch Olympic swimmer.
- Klaib Al-Fawwaz, 66, Jordanian diplomat and politician, Minister of State for Cabinet Affairs (2011–2012).
- Nicolai Gedda, 91, Swedish operatic tenor.
- Miriam Goldberg, 100, American newspaper publisher (Intermountain Jewish News).
- Mary Ann Green, 52–53, American tribal leader and politician, Chairperson of the Augustine Band of Cahuilla Indians (1988–2016).
- Svennik Høyer, 85, Norwegian political scientist.
- Roy Innis, 82, American civil rights activist, Parkinson's disease.
- Elspeth Kennedy, 85, New Zealand sharebroker and community leader.
- Abdulkadir Kure, 60, Nigerian politician, Governor of Niger State (1999–2007).
- Sir James Mancham, 77, Seychellois politician, President (1976–1977).
- Rod Mason, 76, British jazz trumpeter.
- Jovanka Nikolić, 64, Serbian writer.
- Zacharie Noah, 79, Cameroonian footballer (Stade Saint-Germain, Sedan-Torcy).
- Ruth Perry, 77, Liberian politician, interim Head of State as Chairwoman of the Council of State (1996–1997).
- Pioneer Cabin Tree, c.1000, American giant sequoia tree, storm damage.
- Akbar Hashemi Rafsanjani, 82, Iranian politician, President (1989–1997).
- Peter Sarstedt, 75, English singer-songwriter ("Where Do You Go To (My Lovely)?"), progressive supranuclear palsy.
- Colin Shortis, 82, British army general.
- Nigel Spearing, 86, British politician, MP for Acton (1970–1974) and Newham South (1974–1979), Alzheimer's disease.
- Laurie Topp, 93, English footballer (Hendon).
- Eli Zelkha, 66, Iranian-born American entrepreneur, inventor of ambient intelligence.

=== 9 ===
- Qari Saifullah Akhtar, Pakistani Al-Qaeda militant.
- Zygmunt Bauman, 91, Polish-British sociologist.
- Jacques F. Benders, 92, Dutch mathematician.
- Lester Bookbinder, 87, American photographer.
- Rodney H. Brady, 83, American businessman (Deseret Management Corporation) and academic administrator (Weber State University).
- Charles Bragg, 85, American artist.
- Roberto Cabañas, 55, Paraguayan footballer (New York Cosmos, Boca Juniors), cardiac arrest.
- Michael Chamberlain, 72, New Zealand-born Australian pastor, exonerated in the death of Azaria Chamberlain, complications from leukaemia.
- Crazy Toones, 45, American hip-hop record producer and DJ, heart attack.
- Ugo Crescenzi, 86, Italian politician, first President of Abruzzo (1970–1972, 1973–1974), member of the Chamber of Deputies (1987–1992), kidney failure.
- Ulf Dinkelspiel, 77, Swedish politician, Minister of European Affairs and Foreign Trade (1991–1994), cancer.
- Patrick Flores, 87, American Roman Catholic prelate, Archbishop of San Antonio (1979–2004), pneumonia and heart failure.
- Gerry Glaude, 89, Canadian ice hockey player (Chicoutimi Saguenéens).
- Daan van Golden, 80, Dutch artist.
- Mary Emily Gonsalves, 97, Pakistani Roman Catholic nun.
- Jens Christian Magnus, 96, Norwegian politician and resistance activist.
- Wayne O. Manning, 95, American politician.
- Edward Margolies, 91, American author.
- Aaron Martin, 75, American football player (Los Angeles Rams, Philadelphia Eagles, Washington Redskins, Bridgeport Jets).
- Bob McCullough, 85, Australian sports administrator, President of the Australian Paralympic Committee (1994–1996).
- Terry Ramshaw, 74, English rugby league footballer (Featherstone Rovers, Wakefield Trinity).
- Gerry Rinaldi, 72, Canadian Olympic alpine skier (1968).
- John Sailhamer, 70, American evangelical Old Testament scholar, Parkinson's disease.
- Ann Savage, 70, British astronomer, cancer.
- Teresa Ann Savoy, 61, British-born Italian actress (Caligula, Salon Kitty), cancer.
- Ali Shariatmadari, 93, Iranian politician and academic, Minister of Culture (1979).
- Warren Allen Smith, 95, American author, atheist, and gay-rights activist, signatory of Humanist Manifesto II.
- Claude Steiner, 81, French-born American psychologist.
- René Thomas, 88, Belgian biologist.
- Russell Trood, 68, Australian politician and academic, Senator for Queensland (2005–2011), thyroid cancer.
- Brown Turei, 92, New Zealand Anglican co-primate, Archbishop and Pihopa o Aotearoa (since 2006).
- Timothy Well, 55, American professional wrestler (WWF, PNW, WCW), kidney failure.
- T. K. Whitaker, 100, Irish economist and public servant.

=== 10 ===
- Hiag Akmakjian, 91, American author, painter and photographer, lung cancer.
- Horst Astroth, 93, German Olympic racewalker (1960).
- Oddvar Barlie, 87, Norwegian Olympic sport wrestler (1960).
- Ronald Buxton, 93, British politician, MP for Leyton (1965–1966).
- Fernand Decanali, 91, French racing cyclist, Olympic champion (1948).
- Leonard French, 88, Australian glass artist.
- Steve Fryar, 63, American rodeo performer.
- William Goodhart, Baron Goodhart, 83, British lawyer and politician.
- Buddy Greco, 90, American singer, actor (The Girl Who Knew Too Much) and pianist.
- Josef Grumser, 82, Austrian Olympic boxer.
- Roman Herzog, 82, German politician, President (1994–1999), Judge of the Federal Constitutional Court (1983–1994).
- Clare Hollingworth, 105, British journalist (The Daily Telegraph), broke news of German invasion of Poland.
- Achmad Kurniawan, 37, Indonesian footballer (Arema Cronus), complications from a heart attack.
- Claude Lebey, 93, French food critic.
- Steven McDonald, 59, American police detective (NYPD), heart attack.
- Ryszard Parulski, 78, Polish fencer, Olympic silver medalist (1964).
- Võ Quý, 87, Vietnamese zoologist.
- Manlio Rocchetti, 73, Italian make-up artist (Driving Miss Daisy, Lonesome Dove, Gangs of New York), Oscar and Emmy winner (1989).
- Tony Rosato, 62, Italian-born Canadian actor (Saturday Night Live, SCTV, Night Heat), heart attack.
- Oliver Smithies, 91, British-American geneticist, laureate of the Nobel Prize in Physiology or Medicine (2007).
- Kenny Wharram, 83, Canadian ice hockey player (Chicago Blackhawks).

=== 11 ===
- Tommy Allsup, 85, American rockabilly and swing guitarist, complications from hernia surgery.
- Pierre Arpaillange, 92, French author, senior judge and politician, Minister of Justice (1988–1990).
- Hilary Bailey, 79, British writer.
- Tony Booth, 83, British poster artist (The Beatles), cancer.
- Carole Byard, 75, American visual artist.
- Alan Drysdall, 82, English geologist.
- James Fairfax, 83, Australian business executive and philanthropist.
- Peter Fenix, 77, South African cricketer.
- James Ferguson-Lees, 88, British ornithologist (British Birds).
- Brian Fletcher, 69, British jockey, winner of the Grand National (1968, 1973, 1974), cancer.
- Henry Foner, 97, American social activist.
- Katherine Fryer, 106, British artist.
- Victor Griffin, 92, Irish Anglican clergyman and theologian.
- Conrad Hilberry, 88, American poet, complications from cancer and pneumonia.
- Newman Hoar, 96, New Zealand cricketer.
- Mark Josephson, 73, American cardiologist, cancer.
- Victor Lownes, 88, American businessman (Playboy).
- Charles Lyell, 3rd Baron Lyell, 77, British peer.
- Arthur Manuel, 66, Canadian Neskonlith chief, indigenous rights and environmental activist.
- Nikolay Neprimerov, 95, Russian physicist.
- Robert Pierre Sarrabère, 90, French Roman Catholic prelate, Bishop of Aire and Dax (1978–2002).
- Adenan Satem, 72, Malaysian politician, Chief Minister of Sarawak (since 2014), heart attack.
- Saeeduzzaman Siddiqui, 78, Pakistani jurist and politician, Governor of Sindh (since 2016).
- Akio Takamori, 66, Japanese-born American sculptor, cancer.
- François Van der Elst, 62, Belgian footballer (Anderlecht, West Ham United, national team), heart attack.
- Christopher Chubasco Wilkins, 48, American murderer, execution by lethal injection.
- Kenyon Wright, 84, Scottish Episcopal priest and political campaigner.

=== 12 ===
- Giulio Angioni, 77, Italian writer (Le fiamme di Toledo, Assandira) and anthropologist.
- Andrey Arkhipov, 85, Russian Olympic rower.
- Meir Banai, 55, Israeli singer, cancer.
- Carlos Ferreira, 85, Portuguese Olympic sailor.
- Eduardo Blasco Ferrer, 60, Spanish-Italian linguist.
- William Peter Blatty, 89, American novelist and screenwriter (The Exorcist, Legion, A Shot in the Dark), Oscar winner (1974), multiple myeloma.
- Gerry Gersten, 89, American cartoonist.
- Robin Hyman, 85, British publisher.
- Anthony King, 82, Canadian-born British political scientist and commentator.
- Mototaka Kohama, 84, Japanese basketball coach, pneumonia.
- Gerry MacTaggart, 86, Canadian football player (Hamilton Tiger-Cats).
- Milton Metz, 95, American radio and television host.
- Karima Mokhtar, 82, Egyptian actress.
- Vsevolod Murakhovsky, 90, Ukrainian-born Russian politician, First Deputy Premier of the Soviet Union (1985–1989).
- Jill Roe, 76, Australian historian and academic.
- Frank Spellman, 94, American weightlifter, Olympic champion (1948).
- Martha Swope, 88, American photographer, Parkinson's disease.
- Graham Taylor, 72, English football player and manager (Watford, Aston Villa, national team), heart attack.

=== 13 ===
- Gilberto Agustoni, 94, Swiss Roman Catholic cardinal, Prefect of Apostolic Signatura (1992–1998).
- Antony Armstrong-Jones, 1st Earl of Snowdon, 86, English photographer and filmmaker.
- Walter Benz, 85, German mathematician.
- Jerome A. Berson, 92, American chemist.
- Hans Berliner, 87, German-born American computer scientist and chess player.
- Bernard d'Abrera, 76, Australian entomologist.
- Mark Fisher, 48, British writer, cultural theorist and music journalist (The Wire, Fact), suicide by hanging.
- Dick Gautier, 85, American actor and singer (Get Smart, Transformers, When Things Were Rotten).
- Horacio Guarany, 91, Argentine folkloric singer and writer, cardiac arrest.
- Sir John Hanson, 78, British diplomat and historian.
- Robert H. Hughes, 91, American politician.
- Alan Jabbour, 74, American fiddler and folklorist (Library of Congress).
- John Jacobs, 91, English golfer, founder of the PGA European Tour.
- Zainuri Kamaruddin, 50, Malaysian Islamist militant, air strike.
- Magic Alex, 74, Greek electronics engineer (The Beatles, Apple Electronics), complications from pneumonia.
- David Modell, 56, American businessman (Baltimore Ravens), lung cancer.
- Anton Nanut, 84, Slovenian conductor.
- Albert H. Owens Jr., 90, American oncologist.
- Ari Rath, 92, Austrian-born Israeli journalist (The Jerusalem Post).
- Nicodemo Scarfo, 87, American mobster, boss of the Philadelphia crime family (1981–1991).
- Fumiko Shiraga, 49, Japanese-German pianist, breast cancer.
- Jan Stoeckart, 89, Dutch composer, conductor and trombonist.
- Udo Ulfkotte, 56, German political scientist and journalist (Frankfurter Allgemeine Zeitung), heart attack.

=== 14 ===
- Surjit Singh Barnala, 91, Indian politician, Chief Minister of Punjab (1985–1987), Governor of Uttarakhand (2000–2003) and Tamil Nadu (2004–2011).
- John Boudreaux, 80, American drummer.
- Barry Cassin, 92, Irish actor (Mystic Knights of Tir Na Nog, The Count of Monte Cristo, Byzantium).
- Phoebe Cole, 61, American artist.
- Mohammed bin Faisal Al Saud, 82, Saudi royal and businessman.
- Miroslav Horčic, 95, Czech Olympic sprinter.
- Alex Jones, 75, American Roman Catholic deacon.
- Eldar Kuliev, 65, Kyrgyz-born Russian screenwriter and author.
- Herbert Mies, 87, German politician, Chairman of the Communist Party (1973–1989).
- Deepal Silva, 49, Sri Lankan singer, heart attack.
- Kevin Starr, 76, American historian and librarian, heart attack.
- Yama Buddha, 29, Nepalese rapper, suicide by hanging.
- Yee Tit Kwan, 90, Singaporean Olympian
- Zhou Youguang, 111, Chinese linguist and supercentenarian, developed the pinyin romanization system.

=== 15 ===
- Isidro Baldenegro López, 50, Mexican Rarámuri farmer and environmental leader, shot.
- George Beall, 79, American attorney, prosecuted Spiro Agnew for corruption.
- Ciel Bergman, 78, American painter.
- Babette Cole, 66, English children's author.
- Terry Cryer, 82, British jazz and blues photographer.
- Roman Darowski, 81, Polish philosopher.
- John Davis, 78, British anthropologist.
- Richard Divall, 71, Australian conductor and musicologist.
- Dermot Gallagher, 72, Irish civil servant and diplomat.
- Luis Gámir, 74, Spanish politician, Minister of Trade and Tourism (1980).
- Gorky González Quiñones, 77, Mexican potter.
- Han Peixin, 95, Chinese politician, Governor of Jiangsu (1982–1983).
- Kozo Kinomoto, 68, Japanese footballer and sports executive (Japan Football League), heart failure.
- Thandi Klaasen, 85, South African jazz singer, pancreatic cancer.
- Vicki Lansky, 75, American author and publisher, cirrhosis.
- Eddie Long, 63, American pastor (New Birth Missionary Baptist Church), cancer.
- Mieczyslaw Malinski, 93, Polish theologian.
- Nasir al-Din Nasir Hunzai, 99, Pakistani writer and poet.
- Erwin Obermair, 70, Austrian astronomer.
- Paul C. Paris, 86, American metallurgist.
- David Poythress, 73, American military officer and politician, Secretary of State of Georgia (1979–1983).
- Robert Rodman, 76, American computer scientist, complications from inclusion body myositis.
- Shutaro Shoji, 83, Japanese Olympic basketball player (1956, 1960).
- Dale Smith, 88, American rodeo performer.
- Jimmy Snuka, 73, Fijian-born American professional wrestler (WWF, AWA, PNW), stomach cancer.
- Jan Szczepański, 77, Polish boxer, Olympic champion (1972).
- Greg Trooper, 61, American singer-songwriter, pancreatic cancer.
- Aleksandr Yezhevsky, 101, Soviet engineer and statesman.

=== 16 ===
- Carolyn Allport, 66, Australian historian and trade unionist.
- James R. Ambrose, 94, American aerospace executive (Ford Aerospace).
- Amin Nasir, 48, Singaporean football player (Woodlands Wellington, national team) and manager (Hougang United), colon cancer.
- Gene Cernan, 82, American astronaut (Apollo 10, Apollo 17), last person to walk on the Moon.
- Jack Eames, 94, Australian football player (Richmond).
- Roland Glavany, 94, French army general.
- Gerd Grochowski, 60, German opera singer.
- Phyllis Harrison-Ross, 80, American psychiatrist, lung cancer.
- William A. Hilliard, 89, American journalist (The Oregonian).
- Franz Jarnach, 73, German actor (Dittsche) and keyboardist (The Rattles), heart attack.
- Cuthbert Johnson, 70, British musician, liturgist and Benedictine abbot.
- Peter Jones, 83, Australian politician, member of the Western Australian Legislative Assembly (1974–1986).
- Kerry McNamara, 76, Namibian architect and political activist, cancer.
- Jiří Navrátil, 93, Czech Scout leader, President of Junák.
- Dan O'Brien Sr., 87, American baseball executive (Texas Rangers, Seattle Mariners, Cleveland Indians).
- William Onyeabor, 70, Nigerian singer-songwriter.
- Charles "Bobo" Shaw, 69, American jazz drummer.
- C. V. Vishveshwara, 78, Indian physicist.
- Brian Whitehouse, 81, English footballer (West Bromwich Albion, Crystal Palace).
- Steve Wright, 66, American bass guitarist (The Greg Kihn Band), heart attack.

=== 17 ===
- M. M. Ruhul Amin, 74, Bangladeshi judge, Chief Justice (2008–2009).
- Brenda C. Barnes, 63, American businesswoman, CEO of PepsiCo (1996–1997) and Sara Lee (2005–2010), stroke.
- Philip Bond, 82, British actor (Doctor Who, The Onedin Line).
- David P. Buckson, 96, American lawyer and politician, Governor of Delaware (1960–1961).
- Tirrel Burton, 86, American football player and coach (Michigan).
- Paul Chernoff, 74, American mathematician.
- Colo, 60, American-bred western gorilla, oldest gorilla in captivity.
- Mario Fasino, 96, Italian politician, President of Sicily (1969–1972), President of the Sicilian Regional Assembly (1974–1976).
- Heng Freylinger, 90, Luxembourger wrestler, competitor at 1952 Summer Olympics.
- Pascal Garray, 51, Belgian comics artist (Benoît Brisefer, The Smurfs).
- Herbert Gauls, 86, German photographer.
- Alenka Goljevšček, 85, Slovenian writer.
- Tokio Kano, 82, Japanese politician, member of the House of Councillors (since 1998), heart failure.
- Lucy Killea, 94, American politician, member of the California State Senate (1982–1996).
- William Margold, 73, American pornographic actor and director.
- Kenneth McNenny, 81, American politician, member of the South Dakota House of Representatives (1987–2000) and Senate (2005–2008).
- Gene Olaff, 96, American soccer player (Brooklyn Hispano).
- Malcolm Peat, 84, Canadian academic.
- Steven Plaut, 65, American-born Israeli economist and academic.
- Robert Timlin, 84, American federal judge, U.S. District Court for the Central District of California (since 1994).
- Daniel Vischer, 67, Swiss politician, member of the National Council (2003–2015), cancer.

=== 18 ===
- Peter Abrahams, 97, South African-born Jamaican writer (Mine Boy).
- Red Adams, 95, American baseball player (Chicago Cubs) and coach (Los Angeles Dodgers).
- María Nsué Angüe, 71–72, Equatorial Guinean writer and politician.
- Yosl Bergner, 96, Austrian-born Israeli painter.
- Ion Besoiu, 85, Romanian actor (Toate pînzele sus).
- Obed Dlamini, 79, Swazi politician, Prime Minister (1989–1993).
- Ed Dyck, 66, Canadian ice hockey player (Vancouver Canucks, Indianapolis Racers), cancer.
- Ronan Fanning, 75, Irish historian, cancer.
- Gullow Gjeseth, 79, Norwegian military officer.
- Rachael Heyhoe Flint, Baroness Heyhoe Flint, 77, English cricketer (women's national team), businesswoman and philanthropist.
- Zohurul Hoque, 90, Indian Islamic scholar.
- Yuji Ijiri, 81, Japanese-born American accounting academic.
- Janet Jacobs, 88, American baseball player (Racine Belles).
- Jung Mikyung, 56, South Korean novelist.
- Mike Kellie, 69, English drummer (Spooky Tooth, The Only Ones) and record producer.
- Peter Kippax, 76, English cricketer (Yorkshire, MCC), Alzheimer's disease.
- Hanns Kreisel, 85, German mycologist.
- John Levee, 92, American painter.
- André Léveillé, 83, Canadian politician.
- John Little, 86, Canadian-born Scottish footballer (Rangers, Morton, Scotland national team).
- Hubert Lucot, 81, French author.
- Lawrence S. Margolis, 81, American judge, United States Court of Federal Claims (1982–1997).
- Władysław Markiewicz, 97, Polish sociologist.
- Harry Minor, 88, American baseball player and manager (New York Mets).
- Ymer Pampuri, 72, Albanian Olympic weightlifter (1972).
- Roberta Peters, 86, American coloratura soprano, Parkinson's disease.
- David Spicer, 70, American organist.
- Dick Starr, 95, American baseball player (St. Louis Browns).
- Robert Texier, 86, French Olympic rower.
- Juan Thomas, 90, Spanish Olympic sports shooter.
- Samuel Widmer, 69, Swiss physician, psychiatrist and psychotherapist (psycholytic therapy).
- Ståle Wikshåland, 63, Norwegian musicologist, blood clot.

=== 19 ===
- Jalal Allakhverdiyev, 87, Azerbaijani mathematician.
- Wayne Barrett, 71, American journalist (The Village Voice), lung cancer.
- Loalwa Braz, 63, Brazilian singer-songwriter ("Lambada"), burns.
- Thibaut Cuisset, 58, French photographer.
- Miguel Ferrer, 61, American actor (RoboCop, Mulan, Twin Peaks), heart failure and complications of throat cancer.
- Eddie Filgate, 101, Irish politician, TD (1977–1982).
- Ralph F. Fiske, 85, Canadian politician, member of the Nova Scotia House of Assembly (1970–1974).
- Roderick Ham, 91, British architect.
- Terry Hershey, 94, American conservationist and environmentalist.
- Craig Howard, 64, American football coach (Oregon Tech, Southern Oregon).
- Roman Jarymowycz, 72, Austrian-born Canadian soldier and educator.
- Rafael Kadyrov, 47, Russian ice hockey referee, brain tumor.
- Jan Kruis, 83, Dutch cartoonist (Jack, Jacky and the Juniors).
- Kinsey Milleson, 82, American politician.
- Ger van Mourik, 85, Dutch footballer (Ajax).
- Joyce Murland, 79, Canadian wheelchair athlete, Paralympic silver medalist (1972, 1976).
- Paul Ornstein, 92, Hungarian-born American psychoanalyst.
- Edwin Pope, 88, American journalist (The Miami Herald, Athens Banner-Herald), cancer.
- Walt Streuli, 81, American baseball player (Detroit Tigers).
- Guillaume Van Tongerloo, 83, Belgian Olympic cyclist.
- Giovanni Vastola, 78, Italian footballer (Vicenza, Bologna).
- James S. Vlasto, 82, American public servant.
- H. Boyd Woodruff, 99, American microbiologist.
- Teori Zavascki, 68, Brazilian Supreme Court judge, Operation Car Wash reporter, plane crash.

=== 20 ===
- Bruno Amoroso, 80, Italian-born Danish economist.
- Robert Anker, 70, Dutch writer.
- José Luis Astigarraga Lizarralde, 76, Spanish-born Peruvian Roman Catholic prelate, Vicar Apostolic of Yurimaguas (1991–2016).
- Jack August, 63, American historian, specialist in the history of Arizona, liver failure.
- Leendert Bosch, 92, Dutch biochemist.
- Hans Breukhoven, 70, Dutch businessman, founder of the Free Record Shop, pancreatic cancer.
- Joy Coghill, 90, Canadian actress (Da Vinci's Inquest), heart failure.
- Bill Fischer, 89, American football player (Chicago Cardinals).
- Ahmed Gailani, 84, Afghan Qadiriyya leader and politician, founded National Islamic Front of Afghanistan.
- Michael Goldberg, 73, American sports executive (NBCA).
- Judith Palache Gregory, 84, American writer.
- Adele Howe, 65, American computer scientist.
- Klaus Huhn, 88, German sports journalist and writer.
- Naděžda Kavalírová, 93, Czech political prisoner and activist, head of the Institute for the Study of Totalitarian Regimes (2007–2013).
- Alec Devon Kreider, 25, American convicted murderer, suicide by hanging.
- Charles Liteky, 85, American military chaplain and peace activist.
- Harry J. Middleton, 95, American writer and library director.
- Joey Powers, 82, American singer-songwriter.
- Czesław Rajtar, 87, Polish footballer
- Sergio Reolon, 65, Italian politician.
- Colin Rushmere, 79, South African conservationist and cricketer.
- Carlos Alberto Silva, 77, Brazilian football manager (Guarani, Porto, national team).
- Chuck Stewart, 89, American jazz photographer.
- Tommy Tate, 72, American soul singer and songwriter.
- Emma Tennant, 79, British author, posterior cortical atrophy.
- Frank Thomas, 80, French songwriter.
- John Watkiss, 55, British comic artist (Deadman) and concept artist (Tarzan, Atlantis: The Lost Empire), cancer.

=== 21 ===
- Marc Baecke, 60, Belgian footballer (Beveren, national team).
- Alexinia Baldwin, 91, American educator.
- Biruta Baumane, 94, Latvian artist.
- Mark Baumer, 33, American environmental activist, traffic collision.
- Erika Böhm-Vitense, 93, German-born American astronomer.
- Vivien Casagrande, 74, American biologist.
- Byron Dobell, 89, American editor and writer, complications from Parkinson's disease.
- Bernd Drechsel, 63, German Olympic wrestler (1972).
- Jamshid Giunashvili, 86, Georgian linguist and Iranologist.
- Crispin Gonzalez, 80, American ceramicist.
- Vahit Melih Halefoğlu, 97, Turkish diplomat, Minister of Foreign Affairs (1983–1987).
- Yuri Karash, 53, Russian journalist, heart attack.
- José de Jesús Madera Uribe, 89, American Roman Catholic prelate, Bishop of Fresno (1980–1991) and Auxiliary Bishop for the Military Services, USA (1991–2004).
- Hiroki Matsukata, 74, Japanese actor (Battles Without Honor and Humanity, Shogun's Samurai), complications from lymphoma.
- Walter "Junie" Morrison, 62, American Hall of Fame musician (Ohio Players, Parliament-Funkadelic) and record producer.
- William Albert Norris, 89, American judge, United States Court of Appeals for the Ninth Circuit (1980–1994).
- Shirley Paget, Marchioness of Anglesey, 92, British public servant and writer.
- Ernst Petzold, 87, German theologian.
- Maggie Roche, 65, American singer-songwriter (The Roches), cancer.
- Francesco Saverio Salerno, 88, Italian Roman Catholic prelate, Secretary of Apostolic Signatura (1998–2003).
- Dave Shipperley, 64, English footballer (Charlton Athletic, Gillingham).
- Harry E. T. Thayer, 89, American diplomat, Ambassador to Singapore (1980–1985), Director of the American Institute in Taiwan (1984–1986).
- Veljo Tormis, 86, Estonian composer.
- Ken Wright, 70, American baseball player (Kansas City Royals).

=== 22 ===
- Merete Armand, 61, Norwegian actress.
- J. S. G. Boggs, 62, American artist.
- Pietro Bottaccioli, 88, Italian Roman Catholic prelate, Bishop of Gubbio (1989–2004).
- Dan Caspi, 71, Romanian-born Israeli media theorist and academic.
- İlhan Cavcav, 81, Turkish football executive, chairman of Gençlerbirliği S.K. (since 1978), brain hemorrhage.
- Chen Yu-mei, 50, Taiwanese politician.
- Giovanni Corrieri, 96, Italian bicycle racer.
- Søren Elung Jensen, 88, Danish actor (Det støver stadig, King Lear), lung cancer.
- Cristina Adela Foișor, 49, Romanian chess player, International Master.
- Jean Georgakarakos, 76, French music producer.
- Moshe Gershuni, 80, Israeli painter and sculptor.
- Jared J. Grantham, 80, American physician and nephrologist.
- Aleksander Kan, 91, Russian-born Swedish historian.
- Evelyn Kawamoto, 83, American swimmer, Olympic bronze medalist (1952).
- Lisbeth Korsmo, 69, Norwegian speed skater, Olympic bronze medalist (1976).
- Jaki Liebezeit, 78, German drummer (Can), pneumonia.
- Naqsh Lyallpuri, 88, Indian poet and songwriter.
- Katharine Macmillan, Viscountess Macmillan of Ovenden, 96, British politician and aristocrat.
- Andy Marte, 33, Dominican baseball player (Atlanta Braves, Cleveland Indians, Arizona Diamondbacks), traffic collision.
- Masaya Nakamura, 91, Japanese businessman, founder of Namco.
- Lev Navrozov, 88, Russian writer, historian and dissident.
- Werner Nekes, 72, German film director.
- Glenn D. Paige, 87, American political scientist.
- Francisco Palmeiro, 84, Portuguese footballer (Benfica).
- József Torgyán, 84, Hungarian politician, Minister of Agriculture (1998–2001).
- Alexis S. Troubetzkoy, 82, Russian writer and educator.
- Yordano Ventura, 25, Dominican baseball player (Kansas City Royals), traffic collision.
- Pete Overend Watts, 69, English bass guitarist (Mott the Hoople), throat cancer.
- Rudolf Wille, 79, German mathematician.

=== 23 ===
- Volodymyr Bezkorovainy, 72, Ukrainian vice admiral, Commander of the Navy (1993–1996).
- Bimba Bosé, 41, Italian-born Spanish model, designer, singer and actress (El cónsul de Sodoma), breast cancer.
- Kay Cornelius, 84, American novelist.
- Preben Dabelsteen, 91, Danish badminton player, Thomas Cup silver medalist (1949).
- Earl Foreman, 92, American lawyer and sports executive (Washington Whips, Virginia Squires, Major Indoor Soccer League).
- Bobby Freeman, 76, American singer and songwriter ("Do You Want to Dance"), heart attack.
- Dmytro Grabovskyy, 31, Ukrainian bicycle racer, heart attack.
- Ralph Guglielmi, 83, American football player (Washington Redskins, New York Giants).
- Ted Haggis, 92, Canadian sprinter.
- Mustafa Imamović, 76, Bosnian historian.
- Kang Ki-sop, North Korean politician, Director of General Civil Aviation Administration (since 2010). (death announced on this date)
- Leon Katz, 97, American playwright.
- Gorden Kaye, 75, English actor ('Allo 'Allo!, Brazil, Coronation Street), kidney failure.
- Kudditji Kngwarreye, 78, Australian Aboriginal artist.
- Erland Kolding Nielsen, 70, Danish academic, Director General of the Royal Library.
- Leslie Koo, 62, Taiwanese business executive (Taiwan Cement Corporation), fall.
- Boško Krunić, 87, Serbian politician (League of Communists of Yugoslavia), Chairman of the Presidium (1987–1988).
- Li Kwan-ha, 79, Hong Kong police officer, Commissioner of the Royal Hong Kong Police (1989–1994), fall.
- Bernard Redmont, 98, American journalist.
- Douglas Reeman, 92, British author.
- Anatol Roshko, 93, Canadian-born American physicist and engineer.
- Ruth Samuelson, 57, American politician, member of the North Carolina General Assembly (2007–2015), ovarian cancer.
- David Sayer, 80, English cricketer (Kent).
- Franz Schelle, 87, German Olympic bobsledder (1956, 1964).
- Betty Tebbs, 98, British women's rights activist.
- Andrew Telegdi, 70, Hungarian-born Canadian politician, MP for Waterloo (1993–2008).
- Marvell Thomas, 75, American keyboardist.
- Serhiy Tovstoplet, 79, Ukrainian Olympic swimmer (1960).
- Jaroslav Vacek, 73, Czech Indologist.
- Herman Vanden Berghe, 83, Belgian geneticist.
- Mary Webster, 81, American actress (The Delicate Delinquent, The Tin Star, Master of the World).
- G. A. Wells, 90, British professor of German.

=== 24 ===
- Dan Adamescu, 68, Romanian businessman (Unirea Shopping Center).
- Fred André, 75, Dutch football player and manager (Telstar).
- Ronald Kent Campbell, 82, American politician.
- Chuck Canfield, 84, American businessman and politician, Mayor of Rochester, Minnesota (1996–2003).
- Lualemaga Faoa, American Samoan judge and politician, Paramount Chief of Aasu, Governor of Western District (since 2013).
- Robert Folsom, 89, American politician, Mayor of Dallas, Texas (1976–1981).
- Helena Kmieć, 25, Polish Roman Catholic missionary.
- Martin Nicholas Lohmuller, 97, American Roman Catholic prelate, Auxiliary Bishop of Philadelphia (1970–1994).
- Manu Maniapoto, 81, New Zealand rugby union player (Bay of Plenty, Māori national team).
- Porfirio Méndez, 50, Paraguayan Olympic athlete.
- Morris Nettles, 64, American baseball player (California Angels).
- Gil Ray, 60, American drummer (Game Theory, The Loud Family), cancer.
- Jeffrey Rubinoff, 71, Canadian sculptor.
- Butch Trucks, 69, American drummer (The Allman Brothers Band), suicide by gunshot.
- Carlos Verdejo, 82, Chilean footballer (Santiago Wanderers).
- Chuck Weyant, 93, American racecar driver.
- Adlyn White, 87, Jamaican religious leader.
- Philip D. Winn, 91, American politician.
- Peter Woodman, 73, Irish archaeologist.

=== 25 ===
- Arne Asper, 93, Norwegian businessman.
- William Lacy Carter, 91, American politician, member of the Tennessee House of Representatives (1970–1974).
- Stephen P. Cohen, 71, Canadian academic, male breast cancer.
- Ann Dandrow, 80, American politician, member of the Connecticut House of Representatives (1986–2002).
- Ronnie Davis, 66, Jamaican reggae singer.
- Đinh Xuân Lâm, 91, Vietnamese educator and historian.
- Buchi Emecheta, 72, Nigerian novelist (The Bride Price, The Joys of Motherhood, Gwendolen).
- Charles Reis Felix, 93, American writer.
- Shunji Fujimura, 82, Japanese actor (Monkey, Death Note, Black Butler), heart failure.
- Robert Garcia, 84, American politician, member of the U.S. House of Representatives from New York's 21st congressional district (1978–1990), emphysema-induced infection.
- Kevin Geer, 64, American actor (Twelve Angry Men, The Pelican Brief, The Contender), heart attack.
- Sir John Hurt, 77, British actor (Alien, The Elephant Man, Midnight Express), BAFTA winner (1979, 1981), pancreatic cancer.
- Jun Izumida, 51, Japanese professional wrestler (AJPW, Pro Wrestling Noah), heart attack.
- Katja of Sweden, 97, Swedish fashion designer.
- Jean-Pierre Sohahong-Kombet, 81, Central African diplomat, Minister of Foreign Affairs (1981), cancer.
- Nicolae Lupan, 95, Moldovan author and journalist.
- Harry Mathews, 86, American novelist and poet.
- Jack Mendelsohn, 90, American cartoonist and screenwriter (Yellow Submarine, Rowan & Martin's Laugh-In, Teenage Mutant Ninja Turtles), lung cancer.
- Mary Tyler Moore, 80, American actress (The Dick Van Dyke Show, The Mary Tyler Moore Show, Ordinary People), 7-time Emmy winner, cardiopulmonary arrest.
- Jacques Moreau, 83, French politician, MEP (1979–1984).
- Siewert Öholm, 77, Swedish journalist and television presenter, liver cancer.
- Arturo Pérez de Alejo Rodríguez, 66, Cuban dissident.
- Mike Peyton, 96, British cartoonist.
- Ivan Pritargov, 64, Bulgarian footballer (Chernomorets Burgas, CSKA Sofia, national team), stroke.
- Marcel Prud'homme, 82, Canadian politician, MP (1964–1993) and Senator (1993–2009).
- Sir Nigel Rodley, 75, British human rights professor and lawyer.
- Raúl Valerio, 90, Mexican actor.
- Margaret Wall, Baroness Wall of New Barnet, 75, British trade unionist and peer.

=== 26 ===
- Ramdas Agarwal, 79, Indian politician.
- Bakhti Belaïb, 64, Algerian politician, Minister of Trade (1996–1999, and since 2015), cancer.
- Anne-Marie Colchen, 91, French track and field athlete and basketball player, European high jump champion (1946) and basketball world championship bronze medalist (1953).
- Saloua Raouda Choucair, 100, Lebanese painter and sculptor.
- Mike Connors, 91, American actor (Mannix, The Ten Commandments, Tightrope!), leukemia.
- Sir Tam Dalyell, 84, Scottish politician, MP for West Lothian (1962–1983) and Linlithgow (1983–2005), Father of the House (2001–2005).
- Lindy Delapenha, 89, Jamaican football player (Middlesbrough) and sports broadcaster.
- Sherman Friedland, 83, American-born Canadian clarinetist and conductor.
- Martin Froy, 90, British painter.
- Hal Geer, 100, American producer and filmmaker (Looney Tunes).
- Raynald Guay, 83, Canadian politician, MP (1963–1980).
- Barbara Hale, 94, American actress (Perry Mason, Airport, The Window), complications from COPD.
- Barbara Howard, 96, Canadian sprinter and educator.
- Montserrat Julió, 87, Spanish film and television actress (A Land for All).
- Alexander Kadakin, 67, Russian diplomat, Ambassador to India (1999–2004, since 2009), heart failure.
- Leonard Linkow, 90, American dentist.
- Paul Lanneau, 91, Belgian Roman Catholic prelate, Auxiliary Bishop of Mechelen-Brussels (1982–2002).
- David Mantell, 82, English cricketer (Sussex).
- Ken Mason, 97, British medical and legal scholar.
- Fred Parslow, 84, Australian stage and television actor (Alvin Purple).
- Mario Quintero, 93, Cuban Olympic basketball player (1948, 1952).
- Luciano Ravaglia, 94, Italian engineer.
- Charles Recher, 66, American artist, stroke.
- David Rose, 92, British television producer (Z-Cars), founder of FilmFour.
- Dame Laurie Salas, 94, New Zealand women's rights and peace activist.
- Miikka Toivola, 67, Finnish footballer (HJK Helsinki, national team).
- Jun-ichi Tomizawa, 92, Japanese molecular geneticist.
- Michael Tönnies, 57, German footballer (MSV Duisburg).
- Marvin Weissman, 90, American diplomat.

=== 27 ===
- Pierre Albertini, 75, French Olympic judoka.
- Wim Anderiesen Jr., 85, Dutch footballer (Ajax).
- Valery Bolotov, 46, Russian-born Ukrainian militant leader, Head of the Lugansk People's Republic (2014).
- Stan Boreson, 91, American comedian and television host.
- Bob Bowman, 86, American baseball player (Philadelphia Phillies).
- Henry-Louis de La Grange, 92, French musicologist, biographer of Gustav Mahler.
- Gwen Gillen, 76, American sculptor, dementia.
- Wanda Hjort Heger, 95, Norwegian resistance activist.
- Bob Holiday, 84, American actor (It's a Bird...It's a Plane...It's Superman).
- Atanas Kirov, 70, Bulgarian weightlifter, world champion (1973, 1974, 1975).
- Ján Kobezda, 41, Slovak ice hockey player and coach (HK Dukla Trenčín), heart attack.
- Petr Kop, 79, Czech volleyball player, Olympic silver medalist (1964).
- Robert Ellis Miller, 89, American film director (Reuben, Reuben, The Heart Is a Lonely Hunter, Any Wednesday).
- Ney Nogueira, 80, Brazilian Olympic water polo player.
- Dario Palazzani, 62, Italian Olympic sport shooter.
- Yevdokiya Pasko, 97, Russian military officer and pilot, Hero of the Soviet Union.
- Brunhilde Pomsel, 106, German broadcaster and secretary to Joseph Goebbels.
- Geoffrey Raisman, 77, British neuroscientist.
- Tatiana Repeikina, 43, Russian footballer (Ryazan VDV, Zvezda Perm).
- Emmanuelle Riva, 89, French actress (Amour, Thérèse Desqueyroux, Hiroshima mon amour), BAFTA winner (2013), cancer.
- Arthur H. Rosenfeld, 90, American physicist.
- Charles Shackleford, 50, American basketball player (New Jersey Nets, Philadelphia 76ers).
- Billy Simpson, 87, Northern Irish footballer (Linfield, Rangers).
- Gisella Sofio, 85, Italian actress (Accidents to the Taxes!!, La liceale, The Big Heart of Girls).
- Betty Stanhope-Cole, 79, Canadian golfer, cancer.
- Paul Steffen, 87, Luxembourgian Olympic footballer.
- Jack Thrasher, 80, American immunotoxicologist.
- Frank Tidy, 84, English cinematographer (The Duellists, Under Siege, Chain Reaction), dementia.

=== 28 ===
- Kazem Afrandnia, 71, Iranian actor, stroke.
- Evelyn Ammons, 79, American politician.
- Mohammed Bello Abubakar, 93, Nigerian Muslim preacher and polygamist.
- Sir Christopher Bland, 78, British-Irish businessman, Chairman of the BBC (1996–2001), and Olympic fencer, prostate cancer.
- Jean Bogaerts, 92, Belgian racing cyclist.
- Edgar Britt, 103, Australian jockey.
- Iain D. Campbell, 53, British religious leader (Free Church of Scotland), suicide by hanging.
- Renzo Canestrari, 92, Italian psychiatrist.
- Alexander Chancellor, 77, British journalist (The Spectator).
- Lubomír Doležel, 94, Czech literary theorist.
- Sabine Eggerth, 73, German actress.
- Jaakko Elo, 91, Finnish urologist.
- Pat Fothergill, 80, British roboticist.
- Guitar Gable, 79, American blues musician.
- Jean Griswold, 86, American businesswoman.
- Sang Chul Lee, 92, Canadian Christian minister, Moderator of the United Church of Canada (1988–1990).
- Charles LeMaistre, 92, American academic administrator, Chancellor of University of Texas System (1971–1978).
- Many Clouds, 9, Irish-bred British-trained racehorse, Grand National winner (2015), pulmonary haemorrhage.
- John N. Mather, 74, American mathematician.
- Bharati Mukherjee, 76, Indian-born American writer (Jasmine) and academic, complications from rheumatoid arthritis and takotsubo cardiomyopathy.
- Sterling Newberry, 101, American inventor.
- Geoff Nicholls, 68, English keyboardist (Black Sabbath, Quartz), lung cancer.
- Lennart Nilsson, 94, Swedish photographer.
- Anthony J. Perpich, 84, American politician, member of the Minnesota Senate (1967–1976).
- Richard Portman, 82, American sound mixer (The Godfather, Star Wars, The Deer Hunter), Oscar winner (1979), complications from a fall.
- Günter Ropohl, 77, German philosopher of technology.
- William Schwarzer, 91, American federal judge.
- Thomas Joseph Simpson, 95, Canadian World War II veteran.
- Dan Spiegle, 96, American comic book artist (Hopalong Cassidy, Scooby-Doo, Jonah Hex).
- John J. Stamos, 92, American judge.
- Darryl Sutton, 64, Australian VFL footballer (North Melbourne), pneumonia.
- Salvatore Tatarella, 69, Italian politician, MEP (1994–1999).
- Alexander Tikhanovich, 64, Belarusian pop singer (Verasy).
- Stuart Timmons, 60, American gay historian and activist, cardiac arrest.
- Ion Ungureanu, 81, Moldovan actor (That Sweet Word: Liberty!) and politician, MP (1990–1994).

=== 29 ===
- Sir Harold Atcherley, 98, British businessman and arts administrator.
- Ruslan Barburoș, 38, Moldovan footballer (Sheriff).
- Oscar Bolaño, 65, Colombian footballer.
- Pat Corr, 89, Northern Irish footballer.
- Edmund Eiden, 95, American football player (Detroit Lions).
- Willy Fossli, 85, Norwegian footballer (Asker).
- Harald Friedrich, 69, German physicist.
- Joop Gouweleeuw, 76, Dutch Olympic judoka (1964).
- Joseph Mélèze-Modrzejewski, 86, Polish-French historian.
- Howard Frank Mosher, 74, American author (Where the Rivers Flow North), cancer.
- Ko Ni, 64, Burmese lawyer, shot.
- Boris Nikolov, 87, Bulgarian boxer, Olympic bronze medalist (1952).
- William Owens, 36, American Navy SEAL soldier, shot.
- Stanislaw Padewski, 84, Polish-Ukrainian Roman Catholic prelate, Bishop of Kharkiv-Zaporizhia (2002–2009).
- Leonard H. Perroots, 83, American military officer, Director of the Defense Intelligence Agency (1985–1988).
- Michael Rainey, 76, Australian-born British fashion designer.
- Elkin Ramírez, 54, Colombian singer-songwriter (Kraken), brain cancer.
- Mario Reading, 63, British writer and translator, cancer.
- Olav Smidsrød, 80, Norwegian biochemist.
- Elliot Sperling, 66, American historian.
- Leo Taylor, 68, American football player (Calgary Stampeders).

=== 30 ===
- Dore Ashton, 89, American writer and critic.
- Marta Becket, 92, American dancer.
- Winnett Boyd, 100, Canadian engineer.
- Don Coleman, 88, American football player (Michigan State).
- Carmen Contreras Bozak, 97, American World War II veteran, first Puerto Rican woman to serve in the Women's Army Corps.
- Eiður Svanberg Guðnason, 77, Icelandic politician and diplomat, Ambassador to Australia (2003–2007).
- Walter Hautzig, 95, Austrian-born American pianist.
- Gilbert Henderson, 90, Canadian Olympic sports shooter (1960).
- Albert Paul Linnell, 94, American astronomer.
- Doris Lockness, 106, American aviation pioneer.
- Aito Mäkinen, 90, Finnish film director (Onnelliset leikit).
- Mario R. Ramil, 70, Filipino-born American justice, Associate Justice of the Hawaii State Supreme Court (1993–2002), cancer.
- Cesar C. Raval, 92, Filipino Roman Catholic prelate, Bishop of Bangued (1988–1992).
- Harold Rosen, 90, American electrical engineer, complications from a stroke.
- Johnny Wahlqvist, 43, Swedish powerlifter, heart illness.

=== 31 ===
- Konstantin Arsenović, 76, Serbian politician and military official.
- Thomas Barlow, 76, American politician, member of the U.S. House of Representatives from Kentucky's 1st congressional district (1993–1995).
- Grethe Bartram, 92, Danish war criminal.
- John Beasley, 86, Australian racing cyclist.
- Matilde Capuis, 104, Italian organist, pianist and composer.
- Trice Harvey, 80, American politician, member of the California State Assembly (1986–1996), injuries sustained in a fall.
- Kang Bong-kyun, 74, South Korean politician, Minister of Finance (1999–2000).
- Deke Leonard, 72, Welsh rock guitarist (Man).
- Paul McBlane, 53, Australian rugby league referee, heart attack.
- Jim Mitchener, 87, Canadian football player.
- Frank Pellegrino, 72, American actor (Goodfellas, The Sopranos) and restaurateur (Rao's), lung cancer.
- Annie Saumont, 89, French author and translator.
- John Schroeder, 82, British composer, songwriter and record producer (Helen Shapiro, Sounds Orchestral, Status Quo).
- Sheldon Schultz, 94, American physicist.
- David Shepard, 76, American film preservationist.
- Rob Stewart, 37, Canadian filmmaker (Sharkwater), drowned.
- Bobby Watson, 86, American basketball player (Kentucky Wildcats, Minneapolis Lakers, Milwaukee Hawks).
- John Wetton, 67, British singer-songwriter ("Only Time Will Tell", "Heat of the Moment") and bass guitarist (Asia, King Crimson), colorectal cancer.
- Tokitenkū Yoshiaki, 37, Mongolian sumo wrestler, lymphoma.
