= Fantamady =

Fantamady is both a given name and a surname. Notable people with the name include:

- Fantamady Keita (born 1949), Malian footballer
- Cheick Fantamady Camara (1960–2017), Guinean film director
- Cheick Fantamady Diarra (born 1992), Malian footballer
