= Suicide of Randy Potter =

2017 death and subsequent discovery of body

Coordinates: 39.3142°N 94.7039°W

Randy Potter
- Image of Potter distributed after his disappearance
- Born: Randall Wayne Potter; February 13, 1963; Town 'n' Country, Florida, U.S.
- Disappeared: January 17, 2017 (aged 53); Lenexa, Kansas, U.S.
- Died: January 17, 2017 (aged 53); Kansas City International Airport, Kansas City, Missouri, U.S.
- Cause of death: Suicide by gunshot
- Body discovered: September 12, 2017
- Citizenship: U.S.

On September 12, 2017, police investigating a report of a foul odor emanating from a parked truck at Kansas City International Airport (KCI) discovered a heavily decomposed body under a blanket in the front seat. The race and sex could not be determined at first, but it was later identified as Randall Wayne "Randy" Potter (February 13, 1963 – January 17, 2017), who had last been seen leaving his Lenexa, Kansas, home one morning the previous January. He had been reported missing after he failed to arrive at his job that day; his death was ruled a suicide.

Potter's family, who had been searching for him and his truck since his disappearance and keeping the media's attention on the case, were outraged that his body was found at the airport parking lot, an area authorities told them they had searched immediately after they reported him missing. His wife believes that he had purposely taken his life at the airport on the expectation his family would look for him there first. The Kansas City Aviation Department, which runs the airport, apologized to the Potters and promised to investigate how the contractor that manages its parking lots allowed the body to remain undiscovered for almost eight months.

Lenexa police said that since they had not found any evidence that Potter had taken a flight from the airport, and no one had expressed any concern that he might be suicidally inclined, they did not investigate further at the airport as they assumed the authorities there were regularly checking for Potter's truck. The Kansas City Star found that there were other instances of apparently abandoned vehicles remaining in the airport lots for months in the face of apparent official indifference. An editorial in the newspaper recalled a similar incident in 1994 where a woman had found the body of her husband, who had also taken his own life, in the trunk of his car, five days after police at the airport had found the car parked there and returned it to her.

== Disappearance ==
Potter, originally from Town 'n' Country, Florida, had met his wife, Carolina, in her native Sicily while he was stationed there with the United States Navy. After marrying and starting a family in Sicily, they moved back to the U.S. in the 1990s. From Florida, the Potters had moved to Lenexa, Kansas, where Potter worked as a project engineer at T-Mobile and hunted and fished in his spare time. Carolina was a flight attendant, working flights to the East Coast from Kansas City International Airport.

In mid-January 2017, Potter took several days off work to stay at home with his son Matthew, who was sick. Matthew recalls that the two did nothing unusual, mostly staying at home and watching television; he did not see anything atypical in his father's behavior or demeanor. Randy planned to return to work on January 17, and as was his practice, laid out his work clothing the previous evening before retiring.

The next morning, Potter awoke at his usual time. Matthew recalls hearing his father feed the family dogs outside. Around 7 a.m. he left for work in his company-issued 2014 white Dodge Ram pickup truck.

A few hours later, the family received a call from T-Mobile, asking where Randy was as he had not come to work. Calls to his phone were not answered. Carolina Potter found that he had left his work clothes where he had hung them in the bathroom the night before, but his pajamas and the slippers he had put on after rising were still missing, suggesting he had left the house wearing them. She said this was unlike him. The family reported him missing to Lenexa police later that day.

== Search ==
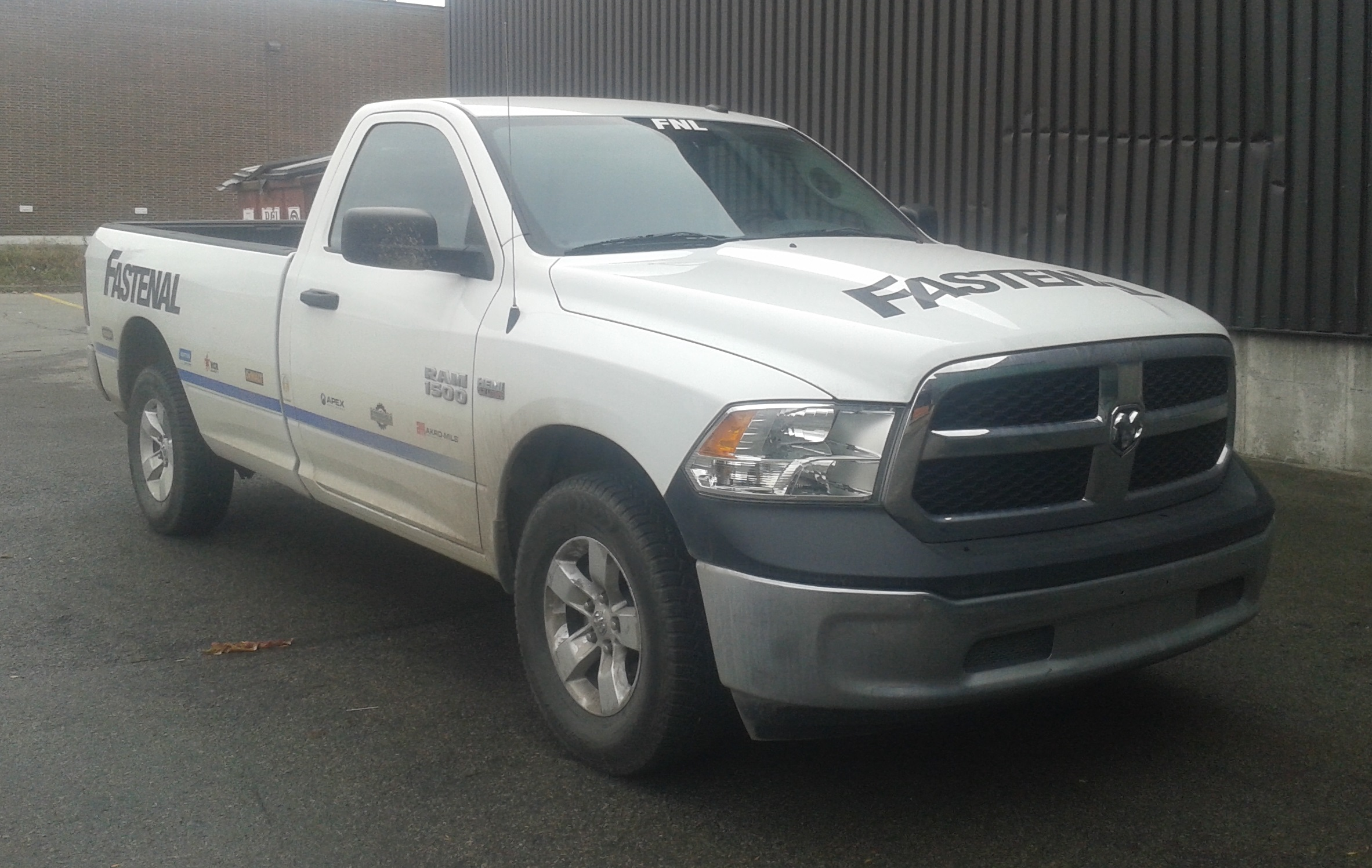
A white Dodge Ram pickup truck similar to Potter's

The family began organizing search parties on its own, and set up a Facebook page. Melissa Alderman, a niece of Potter's from Florida who flew up to assist them, suggested that he might have flown somewhere, so they went to the airport, approximately a 45-minute drive from Lenexa, and looked through the parking lots there. They gave airport police the license plate number of Randy's truck, and they were told it would be checked for regularly as the police recorded the plate number of every vehicle in the lots.

The Lenexa police, however, found no record that Randy had flown anywhere or left the country after checking with federal authorities. They therefore concentrated their search on the greater Kansas City metropolitan area. Joe Underhill, a private investigator hired by the family, looked through lakes and parks in both Kansas and Missouri where Potter might have gone to hunt, fish, or just walk. The Potters' daughter Nichole took fliers and passed them out on trips out of the area, as far away as Denver.

== Discovery of body ==
On the morning of September 12, police at the airport received a report of a foul smell coming from a vehicle parked in Economy Lot B, 2 1/2 miles (4.0 km) north of the terminal buildings, connected to them by a shuttle bus. Inside they found a body covered in a blanket, so decomposed that neither the race nor sex were obvious, along with a gun and a parking lot entry ticket dated January 17. The vehicle was Randy Potter's missing truck and the gun was one that belonged to him, one he usually kept at home. The body was soon identified as his, with suicide the likely manner of death, and his family was notified the next day.

== Reaction ==
Potter's family criticized the airport authorities for having missed the presence of the truck for eight months, especially as the airport police had assured them that if it was there it would be found within the day due to the license-plate identification system, which was claimed to work even when a vehicle with only one plate was parked with that plate at its rear, not visible to passing cars. "How many thousands of people drove by the vehicle?" Alderman asked. "How many people walked by?"

The family also criticized the airport authorities for Potter's body being allowed to remain in the truck, with windows and doors closed, for the rest of the winter and throughout the summer. During those latter months, they noted, temperatures in the area had exceeded 100 °F (38 °C) on several occasions. "I feel awful for thinking about him inside that truck", Carolina told The Washington Post.

At a later memorial service for her husband, Carolina said that while she still did not understand what might have motivated Randy, whom she described as very private with his emotions, to kill himself, she believed he had gone to the airport to do so in order that his body would be found quickly. When she had to go work flights, it was always Randy who would drive her to the airport and return there to pick her up when she was able to get back to Kansas City. "I am beyond mad" about the situation, she told the Kansas City Star. Alderman, too, whose initial theory about where her uncle might have gone turned out to be correct, was angry that instead he "sat there and baked for eight months..."

Three days after the body was found, the Potter family and professionals they had hired to assist with the search and the aftermath of the discovery held a news conference to ask why it had taken so long, since they were dissatisfied with the lack of explanation from the city's Aviation Department. "He could have been found a lot sooner if everybody had done their job", Carolina said. "They dropped the ball", said Underhill, the family's private investigator, who drove past the airport almost every day he was searching and believed he could have found the truck if he had gone into the parking lots to search. "It's amazing that he wasn't found in June or July", agreed John Picerno, the family's lawyer. "Our goal is to find out what happened and why".

The elected city officials who oversee the Aviation Department agreed. "It's obvious someone dropped the ball here", said City Councilman Dan Fowler, echoing Underhill. Teresa Loar, another council member who, like Fowler, sits on the council's Airport Committee, said she would talk with airport officials to "find out what fell through the cracks here".

== Investigations ==
"The City of Kansas City and its Aviation Department express our deepest sympathies to the family and friends of Randy Potter. We wish them peace during this difficult time", a city spokesman said in response to the family's news conference. The city government, he went on to say, was working with the Aviation Department and SP Plus, the government contractor that manages the airport's 25,000 parking spaces, to find out what had happened.

While the airport was outside its jurisdiction, a spokesman for Lenexa police, the first law enforcement agency the Potters notified after Randy failed to show up for work, said that no information given to it would have led investigators to look for him there. "[The airport] was never pointed to as a place that he might be, any more than the local mall," Danny Chavez told People. Once the police ruled out Randy's presence on a flight, they, too, saw no reason to ask airport authorities to look closely in their parking lots. Nor was there "any indication that he was endangered or suicidal" when the family reported him missing, he added. It was, in fact, the opinion of "multiple people" police talked to that Randy had simply decided to leave his job and family and thus was still alive, Chavez added.

According to the Star, SP Plus, a Chicago-based logistical support company which operates parking lots at 53 other airports around the country in addition to KCI, including Washington Dulles and Chicago O'Hare, is contractually obligated to take an inventory of all the license plates of vehicles in the lots at least once a day. That is done just after midnight, when there are the fewest vehicles parked at any time of day. The intent is to allow motorists who may have lost or mislaid their entry tickets while traveling to nevertheless pay the correct amount for the time they parked, by looking up the vehicle's license plate to see how long it was parked.

Local residents who frequently flew for business told the Star that they had seen other instances where cars had been allowed to remain in the lots for months due to apparent indifference from management. One man who passed through the airport almost weekly said he had seen an Audi with a flat tire in the same space near the airport's Terminal B since January; as of the week Potter's body was found, it was still there despite his having reported it twice to airport police in the preceding month. A Lawrence, Kansas, man related how in 2015 an airport shuttle bus driver had pointed out to him cars that had been parked in lots for months.

One man from Blue Springs, Missouri, emailed the newspaper to say that several years earlier, he had seen a minivan with all four tires flat slowly gather dust in the Terminal B parking lot at the airport over the course of several months. When he finally reported it, he was told that while police would check on it, it was not unusual for cars to be parked in the airport lots for months at a time. "If KCI doesn't notice a vehicle with four flat tires, you would have to think airport parking would be a great place for a criminal to abandon a stolen vehicle or hide a body", he wrote.

"I don't want people thinking they can do this on a regular basis", councilwoman Loar agreed. In a written statement to the Star, SP Plus said it was cooperating fully with the city. It noted that Economy Lot B has nearly 6,000 spaces, and there is no maximum time limit for vehicles parked there. Loar responded that she saw that as "part of the problem ... [T]here's no prohibition—you can park out there as long as you want".

In an editorial, the Star agreed. "The fact that there's no limit on the length of time a vehicle can sit in long-term parking is an invitation to dumping cars there, and that does sometimes happen", it wrote. The editors recalled that something similar had happened before. In 1994, airport police had recovered the car of a missing man from another parking lot and returned it to his wife. Five days later, she found his body in the trunk, also a suicide; police had not checked the vehicle's interior when they found it because in that case, too, they believed the man was still alive.

An SP Plus spokesman told the newspaper that the company does attempt to contact the registered owner when it finds a vehicle has been in the lot for a long period of time. If letters go unanswered, after a certain additional period of time the vehicle is considered legally abandoned and towed to the police impound lot.

== See also ==
- Deaths in January 2017
- Lists of solved missing person cases
- Suicide in the United States
