= David Mantell =

English cricketer

Personal information
- Full name: David Norman Mantell
- Born: 22 July 1934; Acton, Middlesex, England
- Died: 26 January 2017 (aged 82); Bexhill-on-Sea, East Sussex, England
- Batting: Right-handed
- Role: Wicket-keeper

Domestic team information
- Years: Team
- 1954–1958: Sussex

Career statistics
Competition	First-class
Matches	26
Runs scored	150
Batting average	6.00
100s/50s	–/–
Top score	34
Balls bowled	–
Wickets	–
Bowling average	–
5 wickets in innings	–
10 wickets in match	–
Best bowling	–
Catches/stumpings	28/2
- Source: Cricinfo, 13 March 2012

David Norman Mantell (22 July 1934 – 26 January 2017) was an English cricketer. Mantell was a right-handed batsman who fielded as a wicket-keeper. He was born at Acton, Middlesex.

Mantell made his first-class debut for Sussex against Cambridge University in 1954. He made 25 further first-class appearances for the county, the last of which came against Essex in the 1958 County Championship. In his 26 first-class matches for Sussex, he scored a total of 150 runs at an average of 6.00, with a high score of 34. Behind the stumps he took 28 catches and made 2 stumpings. Mantell found his opportunities limited, and when the regular Sussex wicketkeeper Rupert Webb announced he would retire from full-time cricket at the end of the 1958 season, Sussex encouraged Jim Parks, a far better batsman than Mantell, to take up wicketkeeping; that led Mantell to leave the county at the end of the 1958 season.

He died on 26 January 2017 at the age of 82.
