= Jacques Moreau =

French politician

- Born: 25 August 1933; Saint-Estèphe, Gironde, France
- Died: 25 January 2017 (aged 83); Paris, France
- Occupation: Politician
- Political party: Socialist Party

Jacques Moreau (25 August 1933 – 25 January 2017) was a French politician. He served as a Socialist Member of the European Parliament from 1979 to 1984.
