= Peter Fenix =

South African cricketer and businessman

Personal information
- Born: 1 February 1939
- Died: 11 January 2017 (aged 77)
- Source: Cricinfo, 18 April 2018

Peter Fenix (1 February 1939 – 11 January 2017) was a South African businessman and cricketer. He played 57 first-class matches for Border and Eastern Province between 1958 and 1972.
