= Lualemaga Faoa =

American Samoan politician

Lualemaga Etuati Tilotilo Faoa (died January 24, 2017) was an American Samoan politician.

Faoa served in the American Samoa Senate and as paramount chief from Aasu, American Samoa. He also served as associate judge and as governor Western District. Faoa died after a short illness in a hospital in Pago Pago, American Samoa.
