= Leo Taylor (Canadian football) =

American gridiron football player (1948–2017)

Profile
- Position: Halfback

Personal information
- Born: October 27, 1948; El Campo, Texas, U.S.
- Died: January 29, 2017 (aged 68)
- Listed height: 5 ft 10 in (1.78 m)
- Listed weight: 185 lb (84 kg)

Career information
- High school: Yates (Houston, Texas)
- College: North Texas

Career history
- 1970–1971: Calgary Stampeders

Awards and highlights
- Grey Cup champion (1971)

Leo Taylor (October 27, 1948 – January 29, 2017) was an American football halfback who played for the Calgary Stampeders. He won the Grey Cup with them in 1971. He played college football at North Texas State University, now known as the University of North Texas.
