= Jack Thrasher =

Jack Dwayne Thrasher
- Born: 13 August 1936
- Died: 27 January 2017 (aged 80)
- Education: California State University, Long Beach, UCLA
- Scientific career
- Fields: Immunotoxicology, environmental toxicology
- Workplaces: University of Colorado, UCLA
- Thesis: The mouse duodenal progenitor population: size, distribution, cell types and age changes as revealed by Thymidine-H³ and autoradiography. (1964)

Jack Dwayne Thrasher (August 13, 1936 – January 27, 2017) was an American immunotoxicologist. His area of expertise was primarily the toxicity of formaldehyde, as well as chlorpyrifos, and he has acted as an expert witness and consultant since 1984. He obtained his bachelor's degree from California State University, Long Beach, after which he traveled to UCLA for five years, during which time he published a paper about the effects of administering thymidine to mice. After he obtained his PhD in 1964, he became an assistant professor at the University of Colorado, Denver, before switching to the Department of Anatomy at the University of California, Los Angeles from 1966 to 1972. While at UCLA, he published a number of papers about the epithelium of various parts of the mouse. The numerous companies he has worked for include Millipore Corporation, which he worked for from 1973 to 1975 as an Application Specialist and Project Manager. More recently, Dr. Thrasher has testified in a court case in which the plaintiff alleged that exposure to fragrances and cosmetics caused her to develop toxic encephalopathy and impairment of her sense of smell due to multiple chemical sensitivity, and has voiced opposition to the practice of treating plants with pesticides, particularly tralomethrin, saying "this practice is insanity."
