= Jack August =

American historian (1954–2017)

Jack L. August (January 7, 1954 – January 20, 2017) was Arizona's state historian. He was considered to be an expert on the politics of water.

== Early life ==
August grew up in Philadelphia, Pennsylvania, the eldest of five children. As a boy was friends with the film director John Waters, with whom he attended a private elementary school. August was also attacked by a bear as a child, leaving a tiny scar, from falling down to hide from the bear in his parents car.

== Education ==
August attended Yale University, on a full scholarship as a swimmer, from which he received his bachelor's degree in history. He later received a master's degree from the University of Arizona and a Ph.D from the University of New Mexico.

== Career ==
August was named historian and director of Institutional Advancement at the Arizona Capitol Museum in early 2016.

== Selected publications ==
- Desert Bloom or Desert Doom?: Carl Hayden and the Origins of the Central Arizona Project, 1922-1964. Prescott, Arizona: Sharlot Hall Museum, 1996. OCLC 49756478
- Vision in the Desert: Carl Hayden and Hydropolitics in the American Southwest. Fort Worth: Texas Christian University Press, 1999. OCLC 38747393
- Dividing Western Waters: Mark Wilmer and Arizona V. California. Fort Worth, TX: TCU Press, 2007. ISBN 9780875653549 OCLC 77830462
- Snell and Wilmer: An Institutional Biography of the New West. Fort Worth, TX: TCU Press, 2013. ISBN 9780875655659 OCLC 840927783
- The Norton Trilogy. Fort Worth, TX: TCU Press, 2013. ISBN 9780875655475 OCLC 811778739
