= Stephen P. Cohen (Middle East scholar) =

American academic

- Born: May 28, 1945; Quebec
- Died: January 25, 2017 (aged 71); Teaneck, New Jersey
- Education: Harvard University
- Occupation: Middle Eastern affairs scholar

Stephen Philip Cohen (May 28, 1945 – January 25, 2017) was a scholar on Middle Eastern affairs. In 1979, he founded the Institute for Middle East Peace and Development and served as president of that institute. The Institute is based at the Graduate Center of the City University of New York.

== Life and career ==
Cohen was born in Quebec on May 28, 1945 to parents of Lithuanian and Romanian-Jewish descent. He obtained a bachelor's degree from McGill University and later earned his Ph.D. at Harvard University in social psychology. Early on he concerned himself with problem-solving workshops between Israelis and Palestinians. He published a book on small group interaction between the two groups.

He has taught at Harvard University, Hebrew University, Princeton University and Lehigh University. In the 1970s he was an intermediary between Egypt's Anwar Sadat and Israel's Moshe Dayan. In this time he also organized the first meetings between Shimon Peres and Anwar Sadat and between Yitzhak Rabin, Shimon Peres and Abba Eban with the leaders of the National Democratic Party (Egypt). Dayan and the future United Nations Secretary-General Boutros Boutros Ghali encouraged him to establish the institute that would become the Institute for Middle East Peace and Development. He developed and maintained relationships with Arab heads of states and Israeli office-holders from the Labor Party and the Likud Party. From 1990 to 2000 Cohen served on the staff of the Center for Middle East Peace and Economic Cooperation, not to be confused with the above cited organization on Middle Eastern affairs.

Cohen was a longtime resident of Teaneck, New Jersey, where he died at the age of 71 on January 25, 2017 from male breast cancer.
