= Malcolm Peat =

Canadian academic

- Born: April 4, 1932; Dundee, Scotland
- Died: January 17, 2017 (aged 84); Italy
- Education: University of Manitoba
- Known for: International Development, Disability, Rehabilitation, Community Based Rehabilitation, Community Development, Physical Therapy, University Educational Development
- Scientific career
- Fields: Rehabilitation, Community Based Rehabilitation, Physical Therapy, Human Anatomy, International Development, Movement Analysis
- Workplaces: Glasgow Royal Infirmary, University of Manitoba, University of Western Ontario, Queen's University

Malcolm Peat, MBE (April 4, 1932 – January 17, 2017) was a Scottish-Canadian academic. He was a Professor Emeritus of Queen's University. He was a pioneer in the development of Physical Therapy and Rehabilitation academically in Canada and was responsible for the design, development, implementation and evaluation of disability and rehabilitation practices throughout the world. He was the first Canadian physical therapist to obtain a doctoral qualification and to assume Directorship of a Canadian university school of rehabilitation (University of Western Ontario), and the first to develop and implement university graduate studies in Rehabilitation in Canada.

== Education ==
- Primary and Secondary, The Gordon School, Huntly, Scotland
- MCSP (Member Chartered Society of Physiotherapy), Bath School of Physiotherapy, 1953
- DipTP (Diploma, Teacher in Physiotherapy), Royal Infirmary, Glasgow, Scotland, 1959
- BPT, School of Medical Rehabilitation, University of Manitoba, 1972
- MSc, Department of Anatomy, University of Manitoba, 1974
- PhD, Department of Anatomy, University of Manitoba, 1976

== Early Professional ==
Between 1960 and 1970 Peat was Advisor to the Foreign and Commonwealth Office and British Advisor to the Ministries of Health in South and South East Asia. His involvement in the British International Development Program in India, Burma, Thailand and the Philippines, for the Government of the United Kingdom, included developed educational programs in Rehabilitation in Southeast and South Asia. For this work he was named a Member of the Order of the British Empire (MBE).

Peat’s early academic professional contributions in Canada were in human movement analysis with seminal contributions made in electromyographic and anatomical studies of the shoulder and normal and pathological gait analysis.

== Academic Posts ==
Peat began his academic career in 1971 as Lecturer, then Assistant Professor in the School of Medical Rehabilitation, Faculty of Medicine, University of Manitoba From 1976 to 1984, he was Associate Professor, then Professor and Director of the Program in Physical Therapy, Faculty of Medicine, University of Western Ontario. In 1984, he became Professor and Director of the School of Rehabilitation Therapy, and Associate Dean of the Faculty of Health Sciences at Queen’s University, Kingston, Ontario. He also was the Associate Dean, Office of International Programs until his retirement.

== International Development ==
Peat has been responsible for furthering the design, development, implementation and evaluation of disability and rehabilitation worldwide. He was the Founding Executive Director of the International. Centre for the Advancement of Community Based Rehabilitation, a Centre of Excellence funded by Foreign Affairs, Government of Canada. Many of these activities have been in Asia, in Countries of Conflict and Post-Conflict in Central and Eastern Europe, and Central America. He has worked with Ministries of Health in various countries in the development of disability policies, policy frameworks and legislation for community based rehabilitation (CBR), scope of practice guidelines, and the formal establishment of CBR within public health systems. Peat also strengthened the capacity of universities and civil society groups in the development of curricula for personnel (students and faculty) and in preparing professionals for community practice. Peat’s extensive experience in policy development, human resources planning, gender equity, training, legislation and accreditation in the area of disability and CBR within health, social and education sectors have made him highly respected in the international community.

Peat died suddenly on 17 January 2017 while on a vacation cruise in Italy. He was 84.

== Awards and honours ==
- 1982, Silver Quill Award for Scientific Writing, Canadian Physiotherapy Association
- 1983, Robins Memorial Lecturer, Rancho Los Amigos Hospital, now the Rancho Los Amigos National Rehabilitation Center, University of Southern California
- 1983, Convocation Keynote Speaker, University of Southern California
- 1983, British Council Fellowship
- 1984, Special Award for Outstanding Contributions in Education, Ontario Physiotherapy Association
- 1985, Enid Graham Memorial Lecturer, Canadian Physiotherapy Association
- 1988, Blue Star Award for Teaching Excellence, Rehabilitation Therapy Society, Queen's University
- 2004, Distinguished Service Award, Queen's University
- 2007, DSc honoris causa, Queen's University, Kingston, Ontario

== Awards for International Development ==
- 1964, Award of Appreciation, Foundation for the Welfare of the Crippled, Bangkok
- 1967, Member of the Order of the British Empire (MBE). Appointed by H.R.H. Queen Elizabeth II to the Order of the British Empire in recognition of service to the field of rehabilitation on behalf of her Majesty's government.
- 1970, Award of Appreciation, Philippine Physical Therapy Association
- 1986, British Council Fellowship
- 1988, Invitation Lecture Award, Seth G.S. Medical College, University of Bombay
- 1993, Dr. Dhygude memorial Oration, Seth G.S. Medical College, University of Bombay
- 1996, Award of Appreciation, City of Sarajevo, Bosnia and Herzegovina
- 2005, MD honoris causa, Riga Stradiņš University, Rīga, Latvia
