= Robert H. Hughes =

American politician

Robert Higgins Hughes

Member of the Texas House of Representatives
- In office January 8, 1957 – August 31, 1963

Personal details
- Born: November 26, 1925 Dallas, Texas, U.S.
- Died: January 13, 2017 (aged 91) San Miguel de Allende, Guanajuato, Mexico
- Party: Democratic
- Spouse(s): Ann Hansson; Kay
- Profession: lawyer

Robert Higgins Hughes (born November 26, 1925 - January 13, 2017) was an American politician. He served as a Democratic member in the Texas House of Representatives from 1957 to 1963.
