= Czesław Rajtar =

Polish footballer

Personal information
- Date of birth: 26 May 1929
- Place of birth: Kraków, Poland
- Date of death: 20 January 2017 (aged 87)
- Place of death: Kraków, Poland
- Height: 1.62 m (5 ft 4 in)
- Position: Forward

Senior career*
Years	Team	Apps	(Gls)
1945–1949	Krowodrza Kraków		
1949–1957	Cracovia		
1957	Wanda Kraków		

International career
1952	Poland	1	(0)
- * Club domestic league appearances and goals

Czesław Rajtar (26 May 1929 – 20 January 2017) was a Polish footballer who played as a forward. He played in one match for the Poland national football team in 1952.
