= Aleksander Kan =

Russian history professor (1925-2017)

Aleksander Sergeevich Kan (31 October 1925 - 22 January 2017) was a Russian born historian and professor at Uppsala University in Sweden.

== Biography ==
Aleksander Kan was born in Moscow. During World War II he served as an interpreter in the Soviet Army 1944 – 1945. In the Soviet Union he wrote several books about the history of Scandinavia from a Marxist standpoint. He emigrated with his family to Sweden in 1987 with help from the Swedish Prime Minister Ingvar Carlsson, and became a Swedish citizen in 1992.

In the Spring of 1987, Kan was a Fellow at the Swedish Collegium for Advanced Study in Uppsala, Sweden.

He was a member of the Norwegian Academy of Science and Letters.
