= Francesco Saverio Salerno =

Francesco Saverio Salerno (August 27, 1928 – January 21, 2017) was a Catholic bishop.

Ordained to the priesthood in 1952, Salerno was named titular bishop of Cerveteri and secretary of the Apostolic Signatura, Italy, in 1997. He served as secretary from 1998 to 2003.
