= Yuri Karash =

Russian space policy expert and journalist

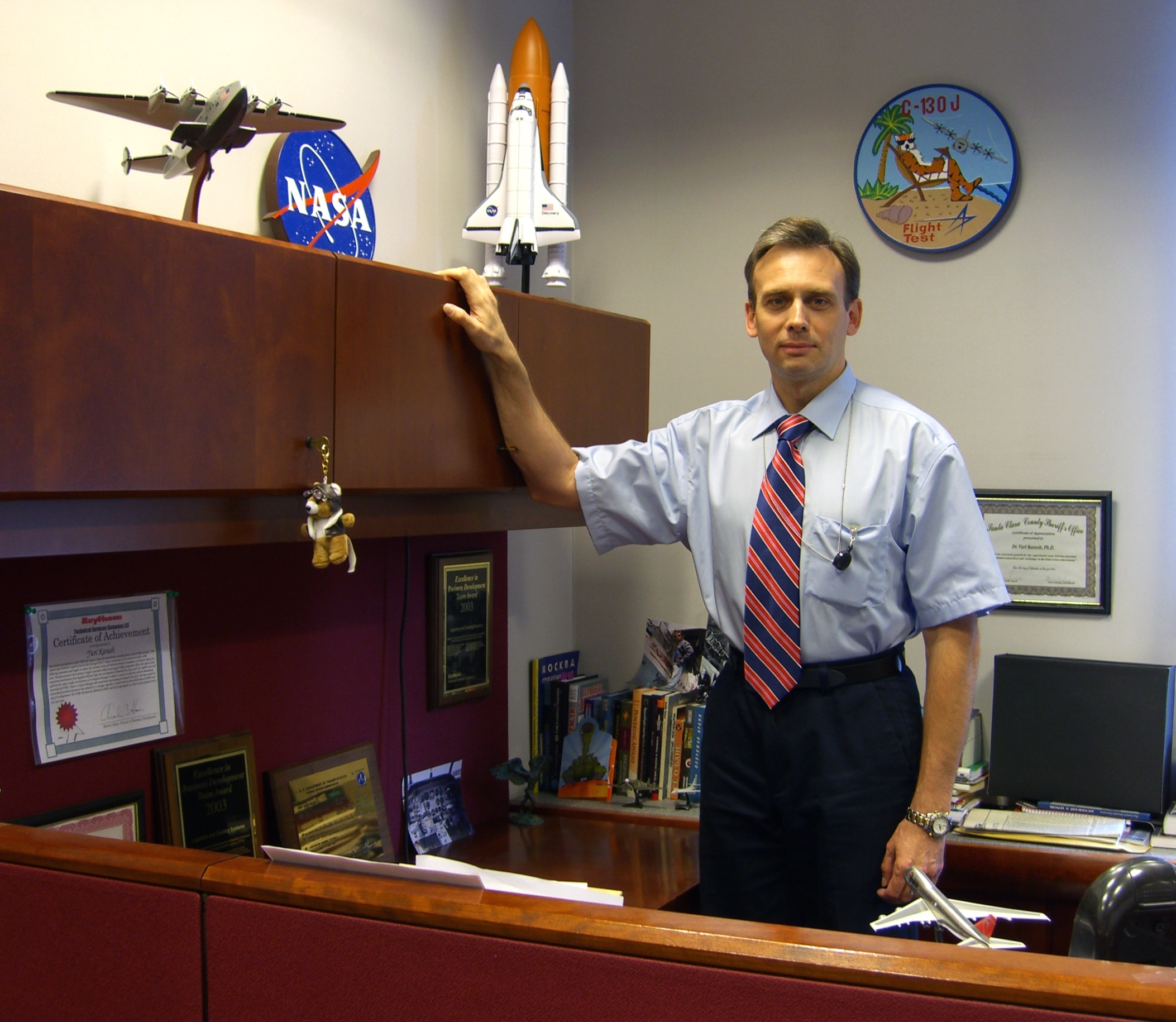
- Yuri Karash
- Born: 16 June 1963; Leningrad, Soviet Union
- Died: 21 January 2017 (aged 53); United States
- Citizenship: Russian
- Scientific career
- Fields: Astronautics

Yuri Yurevich Karash (Russian: Юрий Юрьевич Караш; 16 June 1963 – 21 January 2017) was a Russian space policy expert and journalist.

== Academic background ==
In 1990, Karash was one of the finalists in the Soviet Journalist-in-Space project and a candidate for space flight. In 1992, while already having a Russian Candidate of Sciences degree, he graduated from the Paul H. Nitze School of Advanced International Studies (SAIS) at Johns Hopkins University in Washington, D.C., with Masters of International Public Policy degree. The same year he was accepted for PhD training at the School of International Service in the American University in Washington, D.C. During his studies at SIS he also took classes at the Space Policy Institute at George Washington University. He got his PhD in International Relations with concentration in Space Policy issues in 1997. His dissertation was published by the American Institute of Aeronautics and Astronautics under the title: The Superpower Odyssey. A Russian Perspective on Space Cooperation. In 2000, Karash became a corresponding member of the Tsiolkovskiy Russian Academy of Cosmonautics.

== Flight experience ==
In 1985–1989, Yuri Karash was an aerobatic pilot at the Chkalov Central Flight Club in Moscow. In 1994–1995, he took flight training at the Bay Bridge Aviation flight school in Maryland and became the first Russian citizen to be rated by the U.S. Federal Aviation Administration as a Commercial Pilot with Single Engine, Multiengine and Instrument Flight Rules ratings. In 2010, Karash got a Certificate of Course Completion after successfully completing the "Flight Crew Transition Course Up To and Including Simulator" on Airbus A320 at the Airbus Training and Flight Operations Center in Toulouse, France.

== Space policy and journalistic experience ==
Since 2000, Karash has been intensively involved in the development of the Russian space policy through his numerous articles and presentations in the Russian mass media. He proposed a concept of the hybrid 'fly by – orbital' crewed/automatic mission to Mars (Mars Piloted Orbial Station – MARPOST) as the most realizable in the current Russian economic conditions.

Karash has a considerable experience working for the Russian and foreign mass media. He worked as a special correspondent for The Washington Times newspaper and Space.com internet paper. His articles covering space and political developments were published by the Los Angeles Times, The New York Times, Chicago Tribune, Baltimore Sun, San Francisco Chronicle, Florida Today and Space News newspapers.

He also wrote for Russian newspapers on space policy issues, including Nezavisimaya Gazeta and Izvestia, while also consulting Russkaya Sluzhba Novostey (Russian News Service), as well as Mayak, Vesti FM, Kommersant FM, Business FM, Komsomolskaya Pravda FM radio stations, BBC, CBC, Russia Today, TVC, RBK TV radio stations and TV channels on space issues.

== Death ==
Karash died after suffering a heart attack on 21 January 2017.
