= Jim Mitchener =

Canadian football player (1929–2017)

Profile
- Position: Halfback

Personal information
- Born: March 19, 1929; Donavon, Saskatchewan, Canada
- Died: January 31, 2017 (aged 87); Augusta, Georgia, U.S.
- Listed height: 6 ft 0 in (1.83 m)
- Listed weight: 190 lb (86 kg)

Career history
- 1948: Calgary Stampeders
- 1952–1956: Montreal Alouettes
- 1956–1957: BC Lions

Awards and highlights
- Grey Cup champion (1948)

James Walter Mitchener (March 19, 1929 – January 31, 2017) was a Canadian professional football player who played for the Calgary Stampeders, Montreal Alouettes, and BC Lions. He won the Grey Cup with the Stampeders in 1948.

== Career ==
Mitchener played junior football with the McGill University Redmen. Mitchener resided in South Carolina and was one of the last surviving members of the 1948 Grey Cup championship team. After graduating from both McGill University and McGill Medical School, Mitchener worked as a pathologist at University Hospital for many years where he helped establish the Epidemiology Department. Early in his career, he taught Pathology at the Medical College of Georgia. Mitchener retired from Port Huron Hospital. Mitchener died on January 31, 2017.
