= Roman Darowski =

Roman Darowski (12 August 1935 – 15 January 2017) was a Jesuit priest, philosopher, and professor in the Faculty of Philosophy at the Jesuit University of Philosophy and Education Ignatianum in Kraków.

== Biography ==
Darowski entered the Jesuit Order in 1951 and was ordained priest in Warsaw in 1961. He studied philosophy at the Jesuit Faculty of Philosophy in Kraków from 1955 to 1958 and theology at the Jesuit Faculty of Theology: Bobolanum in Warsaw from 1958 to 1962. Afterwards, he continued his philosophical studies at the Gregorian University in Rome from 1963 to 1966, where he obtained a Ph.D., and in Munich from 1966/67. Since 1990 he had been a full professor (professor ordinarius).

Since 1967, Darowski had been a lecturer in philosophy, mainly in philosophical anthropology, at the Jesuit Faculty of Philosophy in Kraków, now Akademia Ignatianum. He would then become a dean of the Faculty of Philosophy (1968–1982, 1994–1997, and 2001–2007); rector of the Jesuit College in Kraków (1978–1984); founder and the first editor (1996–2006) of a multilingual review called Forum Philosophicum; and member of the Committee for the History of Science and Technology of the Polish Academy of Sciences.

Darowski published mainly in the field of philosophical anthropology and in the field of the history of philosophy in Poland, especially that of the Jesuits. He has published 15 books and over 300 articles – over 50 of them in foreign languages.

== Philosophy ==
Darowski's philosophical views are presented most clearly in his books: Filozofia człowieka [Philosophy of Man, 5 Polish editions] and Philosophical Anthropology. Outline of fundamental problems, 2014.

Darowski's philosophy takes its inspiration from the Aristotelian and Thomistic traditions. He also takes into consideration new currents of philosophical thought, especially the personalistic and axiological tendencies, but also, in some fashion, the dialogical one (cf. Philosophical Anthropology, especially the chapter entitled “Human Being as a Dialogical Being”, pp. 123–126). He does not avoid the new achievements of the life sciences; instead, he attempts to integrate them with philosophy (cf. the chapters entitled “Human Corporeality”, pp. 38–43, and “The Origin of Human Being”, pp. 95–99 of the work just mentioned). Especially in its initial stages, there are many elements in his application of his method resembling a phenomenological description.

== Principal publications ==
- Człowiek świat [Man and World], Kraków 1972.
- La théorie marxiste de la vérité, Rome 1973.
- Człowiek: istnienie i działanie [Man: his existence and his activity], Kraków 1974.
- Filozofia w szkołach jezuickich w Polsce w XVI wieku [Philosophy in the Jesuit Schools in Poland in the 16th Century], Kraków 1994.
- Filozofia człowieka [Philosophical Anthropology], Kraków 1995.
- Studia z filozofii jezuitów w Polsce w XVII i XVIII wieku [Studies in the Philosophy of the Jesuits in Poland in the 17th and 18th Centuries], Kraków 1998.
- Studies in the Philosophy of the Jesuits in Poland in the 16th to 18th Centuries, Cracow 1999.
- Filozofia jezuitów w Polsce w XX wieku [Philosophy of the Jesuits in Poland in the 20th Century], Kraków 2001.
- Szczepanowice nad Dunajcem. Dzieje wsi, parafii katolickiej i gminy kalwińskiej [Szczepanowice on the Dunajec River. History of the Village, Catholic Parish and Calvinist Community], second enlarged ed., Kraków 2004 (summaries, p. 502–505, 554–555).
- Szczepanowice nad Dunajcem, ed. R. Darowski, Kraków 2005.
- Philosophiae & Musicae. Liber Jubilaris Prof. S. Ziemiański septuagesimum quintum annum celebranti dicatus, ed. R. Darowski, Kraków 2006.
- „Tezy z całej filozofii” z Krakowskiego Kolegium Jezuitów (1894), Kraków 2007. – «Theses ex universa philosophia» e Cracoviensi Collegio Maximo Societatis Jesu (1894). Introductio, Reproductio textus originalis 190 thesium; Traductio polona.
- Polish Contributions to World Philosophy, in: The Contribution of Polish Science and Technology to World Heritage, ed. by I. Stasiewicz-Jasiukowa, Kraków-Warszawa 2010, pp. 257–285.
- Ks. Piotr Skarga SJ (1536–1612). Życie i dziedzictwo [Fr. Piotr Skarga SJ (1536–1612). Life and Heritage. Ed. by R. Darowski and S. Ziemiański], Kraków 2012.
- The Perennial Value of Peter Skarga’s Legacy, ibidem, pp. 419–436.
- Filozofia jezuitów na ziemiach dawnej Rzeczypospolitej w XIX wieku [Philosophy of the Jesuits on the territories of the former Commonwealth: Poland, Lithuania, Belarus and Ukraine in the 19th century], Kraków 2013.
- Philosophical Anthropology. Outline of fundamental problems, Kraków 2014.
- Filozofia człowieka [Philosophy of Man], 5th ed., Kraków 2015 (Table of contents – Theses, p. 281–284; Table des matières – Thèses, p. 285–288).
- Fragmenta philosophica. Selected Papers by Roman Darowski SJ Published on His 80th Birthday, Kraków 2015.

== Sources ==
- Philosophia vitam alere. Studia Prof. R. Darowski septuagenario dicata, ed. S. Ziemiański, Kraków 2005.
- Prof. Roman Darowski, S.J. On the Occasion of his Seventieth Year, ”Forum Philosophicum”, 10: 2005, pp. 253–255.
- Biography, Bibliography etc. in: Fragmenta philosophica, pp. 11–131.
- Who’s Who in the World, 19th Edition, 2002 – Marquis Who's Who (USA).
- International Who’s Who of Intellectuals, 13th Edition, Cambridge 1998.
- Dictionary of International Biography, 29th Edition, 2001.
- Who’s Who in the 21st Century, Cambridge 2002, and posterior editions of above-mentioned books.
- "Prof. ord. dr habil. Roman Darowski SJ". darowski.jezuici.pl.
