= Jun-ichi Tomizawa =

Japanese molecular geneticist

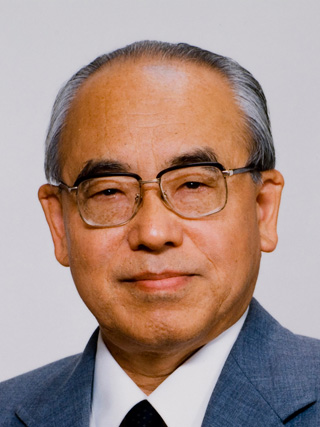
- Born: June 24, 1924; Tokyo, Japan
- Died: January 26, 2017 (aged 92); Mishima, Shizuoka, Japan
- Education: University of Tokyo
- Occupation: Molecular geneticist

Jun'ichi Tomizawa (Japanese: 富澤 純一 Tomizawa Jun'ichi; June 24, 1924 – January 26, 2017, in Mishima, Shizuoka, Japan) was a Japanese molecular geneticist.

== Life and work ==
Tomizawa completed his pharmacology studies at the University of Tokyo in 1947 under the guidance of Morizo Ishidate. Following that, he worked at the Japanese National Institute of Health, conducting research on DNA replication in bacteriophages. From 1957, he collaborated with Alfred Day Hershey at the Carnegie Institution of Washington and later with Cyrus Levinthal at the Massachusetts Institute of Technology. Returning to the Japanese National Institute of Health in 1960, he assumed leadership of the Chemistry Department in 1961 and conducted courses on bacteriophage biology at Kanazawa University.

In 1965, Tomizawa was appointed as a professor and head of the Biology Department at Osaka University. He later moved to the United States in 1971 to work at the National Institutes of Health. From 1989 until his retirement in 1997, Tomizawa served as the Director of the National Institute of Genetics in Mishima. Additionally, from 1996 to 2006, he served as the founding editor of the scientific journal Genes to Cells, the official publication of the Japanese Society for Molecular Biology.

Tomizawa was recognized as a pioneer in molecular biology in Japan. He significantly contributed to understanding the mechanisms of gene replication, notably discovering replication control through RNA. According to the Scopus database (as of October 2019), Tomizawa had an h-index of 43. He actively supported and mentored numerous doctoral and postdoctoral students. Moreover, he donated 150 million yen from his private funds to establish a program benefiting young scientists in life sciences.

For his contributions, Tomizawa received several honors: he was elected to the American Academy of Arts and Sciences in 1971, the Japan Academy of Sciences in 1990, and the National Academy of Sciences in 1995. He was awarded the Asahi Prize in 1986 and was named a Person of Cultural Merit in 2000.

== Literature ==
- Ogawa, Hideyuki; Ogawa, Tomoko (2018-07-13). "In memory of Jun‐ichi Tomizawa, Professor Emeritus of the National Institute of Genetics". Genes to Cells. 23 (7): 508–511. doi:10.1111/gtc.12595. ISSN 1356-9597.
