= Il va pleuvoir sur Conakry =

- Directed by: Cheick Fantamady Camara
- Screenplay by: Cheik Fantamady Camara
- Produced by: C.O.P. Films, Les films Djoliba
- Starring: Balla Moussa Keita, Alex Ogou, Tella Kpomahou, Fatoumata Diawara
- Cinematography: Robert Millié
- Edited by: Joëlle Dufour
- Music by: Ismaël Sy Savané
- Release date: 23 May 2007 (Cannes Film Festival)
- Running time: 113 minutes
- Countries: France; Guinea

Il va pleuvoir sur Conakry is a 2007 French film.

== Synopsis ==
BB works as a political cartoonist at a liberal newspaper and is in love with the boss' lovely, talented computer scientist daughter, Kesso. But his choice meets with stiff opposition from his strict Muslim father Karamako, who is the guardian of the ancestral tradition of their village as well as imam of Conakry. Karamako's dream inspired insistence that BB go to Saudi Arabia to study to become an imam, against the young man's wishes, further complicates the relationship, especially when Kesso becomes pregnant with BB's child.

== Awards ==
- Ouidah (Benín) 2008
- Verona 2007
- Tübingen-Stuttgart 2007
- Songes d'une nuit DV 2007
- FESPACO 2007
