= Crispin Gonzalez =

American ceramicist and educator (1936–2017)

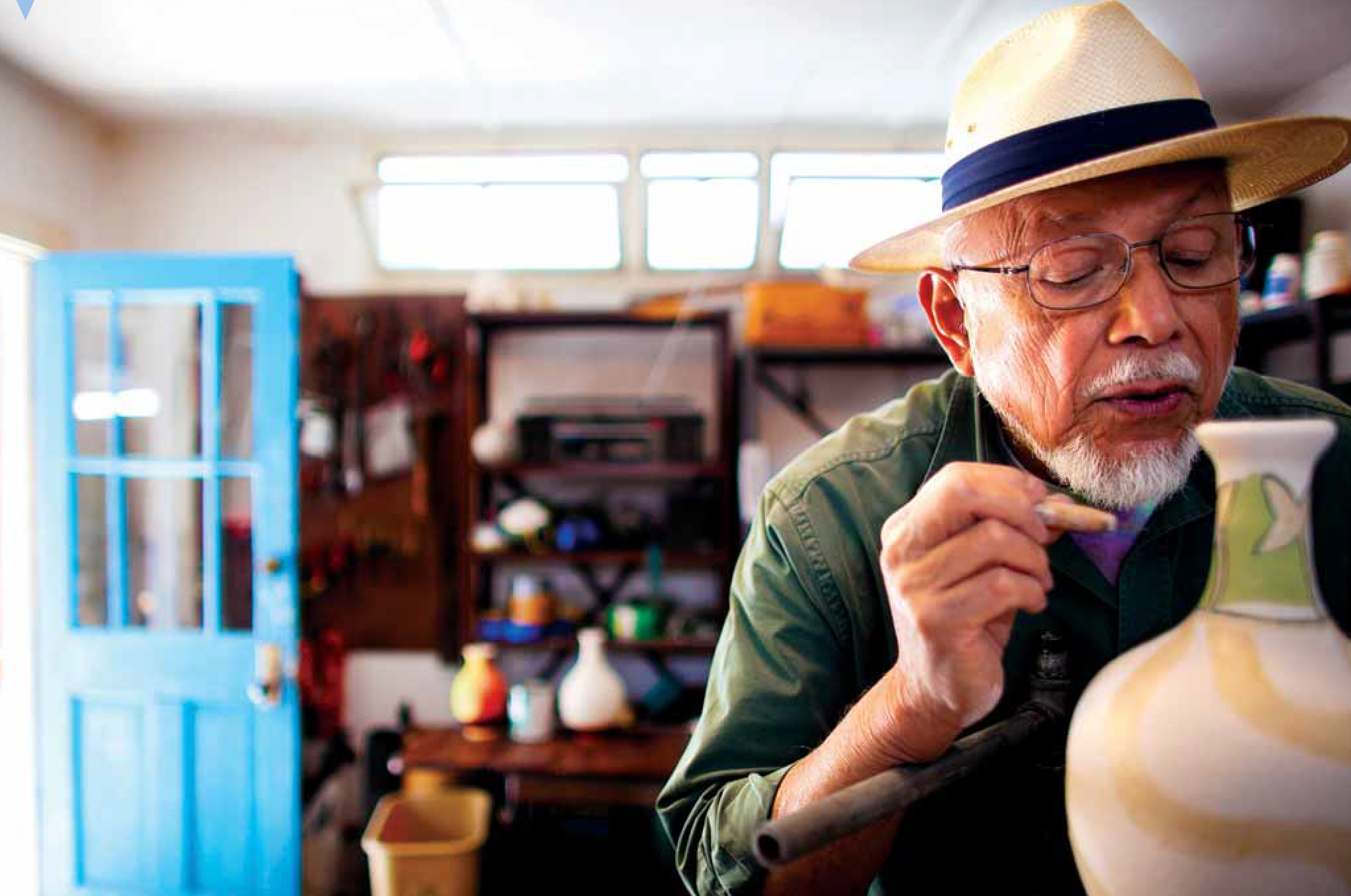
- Gonzalez in his Claremont studio
- Born: April 13, 1936; Claremont, California, U.S.
- Died: January 21, 2017 (aged 80); Claremont, California, U.S.
- Education: Mt. San Antonio College; California State University, Fullerton; Claremont Graduate University (MFA)
- Known for: Ceramic art
- Notable work: Ocean Boogie, Drive By
- Style: Traditional motifs with contemporary ceramic techniques
- Movement: Chicano art movement
- Awards: Purchase Award, 24th Ceramic National Exhibition

Crispin Gonzalez (April 13, 1936 – January 21, 2017) was an American ceramicist known for his innovative approach to ceramic art.

His works often incorporate traditional Indigenous, Mexican, and Asian motifs, combined with contemporary themes and experimental glazing techniques. Gonzalez's career spanned over thirty-three years as a professor of ceramics at Chaffey College and other institutions, where he mentored a generation of artists, many of whom have continued his legacy in ceramics.

== Early life and education ==
Gonzalez was born in and raised in Claremont, California. He attended Claremont High School, played varsity football, and later pursued higher education in art and ceramics at Mt. San Antonio College and California State University, Fullerton, where he studied under Jerry Rothman. He received his Master of Fine Arts degree from Claremont Graduate University, where he studied with notable ceramicists, including Henry Takemoto, Paul Soldner, and Peter Voulkos.

== Career and teaching ==
Gonzalez began his teaching career as an adjunct professor at California State University, Los Angeles, the University of Southern California, and Pitzer College between 1968 and 1971. In 1971, he secured a full-time position at Chaffey College, where he taught for thirty-three years until his retirement in 2004. At Chaffey, Gonzalez developed specialized courses in kiln-building and glaze techniques, influencing many students to pursue higher degrees in ceramics and establish their own studios. His teaching style and technical expertise left a lasting impact on his students and the ceramics community at large.

== Artistic style and themes ==
Gonzalez's work is characterized by its technical complexity and thematic depth. He often combined traditional Native American, Aztec, and Mayan patterns with contemporary forms and techniques. His Ocean Boogie series, inspired by marine life, and his Drive By series, which memorializes victims of shootings in Los Angeles, exemplify his ability to fuse personal narrative with broader social themes. He also revived traditional ceramic forms, drawing decorative motifs from ancient Greece and historical glazes from Korea and Japan.

== Exhibitions and collections ==
Gonzalez's work has been featured in numerous exhibitions, including the 24th Ceramic National Exhibition at the Everson Museum of Art in Syracuse, New York, where he received a Purchase Award. His work was also exhibited at the International Pottery Design Competition in Nagoya, Japan, and the Scripps Annual Invitational. His pieces are part of several permanent collections, such as the Marer Collection of Contemporary Ceramics at Scripps College, the Sam Maloof collection, and the American Museum of Ceramic Art.

== Legacy ==
In addition to his artistic contributions, Gonzalez served as a mentor and advisor within the ceramics community, participating in the American Museum of Ceramic Art's acquisition board. His influence can be seen in the works of many contemporary ceramicists who cite his teaching and guidance as pivotal in their careers.

One of them, Mary Beirele, a former student and now ceramics teacher, describes Gonzalez's impact as extending beyond Chaffey College, guiding many art students toward professional careers. She notes his unique teaching approach, which encouraged students to discover their own artistic expression, and his willingness to devote additional time to help with complex ceramic techniques. Beirele also mentions his generosity, as he often contributed both his work and time to benefit the community. She credits Gonzalez with inspiring important changes in her life and expresses appreciation for his influence.

== Personal life ==
In addition to his work in ceramics, he was involved in woodworking, kite building, and music.

=== Death ===
Gonzalez died on January 21, 2017, at the age of 80. He was celebrated for his contributions to ceramics and his role as a mentor at Chaffey College for over three decades. A memorial service was held on March 18, 2017, in Claremont, California.

== Selected works ==
- Ocean Boogie (1980s)
- Drive By (1990s)
