= Hiag Akmakjian =

American novelist

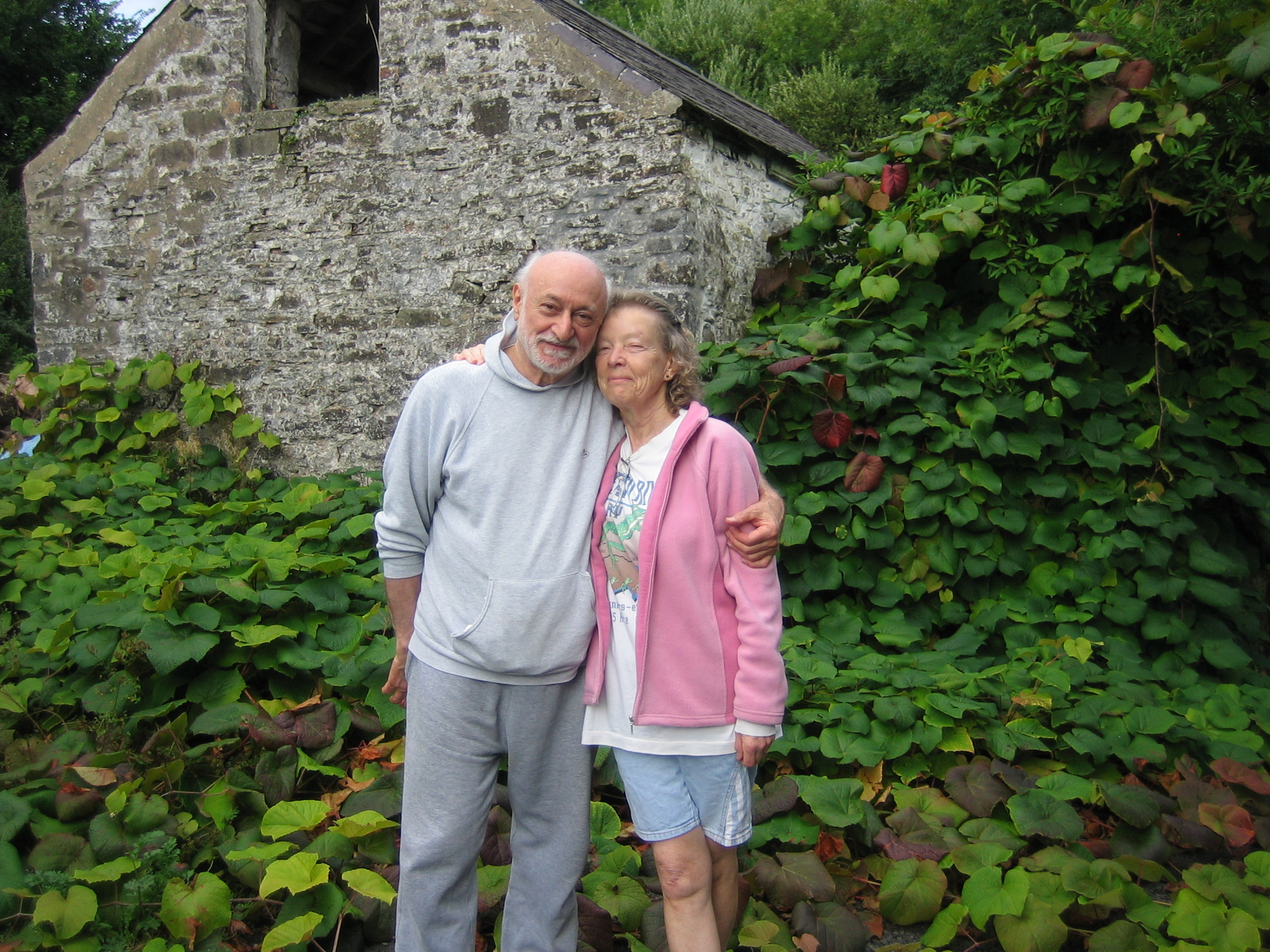
Hiag and Margaret Akmakjian

Hiag Akmakjian (July 17, 1926 – January 10, 2017) was an American published author, painter and photographer.

== Biography ==
Born in Jersey City, New Jersey, Akmakjian grew up during the Great Depression as one of three sons of Ervant and Vartanoush Akmakjian, refugees from the Armenian genocide. After serving in the U.S. Army during World War II, he graduated from Columbia University in 1948, and then moved to France where he studied at the Sorbonne by means of the G.I. Bill while simultaneously attending Académie de la Grande Chaumière, an art school in Montparnasse. Upon his return to America in the early 1950s, Akmakjian attempted to be a painter in the abstract expressionism style, but grew tired of the art scene and started studying photography. He also studied psychoanalysis at the Washington Institute in New York City, and then began to practice in New York, while also working as an editor at a New York publishing house.

In retirement he moved to the south of France where he resumed painting in a more Impressionism style. Later on he moved to Wales after marrying his English wife, Margaret.

=== Career ===
His interest in psychology and child development led to his writing The Natural Way to Raise a Healthy Child in 1975, a book that was selected by the Book of the Month Club, the Psychiatry and Social Sciences Book Club and the Psychology Today Book Club. Then an idea to write about Edward Weston prompted him to move to California, though the book never developed beyond the notes stage. However, having written a book about child rearing, he was given an opportunity to write a weekly Q&A column on infant and child development called "The Good Enough Parent" in the Monterey, California Herald.

He continued furthering his photography studies, during which time he befriended Ansel Adams in the late 1970s to early 1980s. Years later he was interviewed by BBC Radio to talk about recorded tapes he made with Ansel Adams.

In 1979 he wrote Snow Falling from a Bamboo Leaf: The Art of Haiku.

In the late-1990s he wrote his first novel, 30,000 Mornings. It was published in Germany in 1999 under the title Gedanken eines Supermodels nach dem dritten Glas Wodka.

== Death ==
Akmakjian was married to his wife Margaret and lived in Wales until his death from lung cancer on January 10, 2017. They had a son, Nicolas.

== Works ==
=== Novels ===
- 30,000 Mornings, Viking/Penguin, London, 1999
- "Name Dropping: The Cedar Bar in the 1950s", riverrun Publishing, New York, 2012
- "Cleo", riverrun Publishing, New York, 2016

=== Non-fiction books ===
- The Natural Way to Raise a Healthy Child, Praeger, New York, 1975
- Snow Falling from a Bamboo Leaf, Capra Press, Santa Barbara, 1979
- Writing to Get Published, riverrun Publishing, New York, 2011
- Babyloving, riverrun Publishing, New York, 2015

=== Short stories ===
- Gite, published in The Flash (edited by Peter Wild); Social Disease UK, London 2007
- Sunday, published in The Empty Page: Fiction inspired by Sonic Youth (edited by Peter Wild); Serpent's Tail, London, 2008
- A Room on the Left Bank, published in 3:AM London, New York, Paris (edited by Andrew Stevens); published by Social Disease UK, London 2008

=== Publications ===
- Psychoanalysis and the Future of Literary Criticism, The Psychoanalytic Review, 1962
- The Unfabulous Civil War, published in The Realist, December 1961
- Hemingway and Haiku in The Columbia University Forum, Spring 1966 and reprinted in Japan-America Forum No.1, 1967
- Treatment Guide for Psychoanalysis and Psychoanalytic Psychotherapy, The Psychoanalytic Press, 1969
- Awakening Your Child’s Consciousness, Health and Consciousness, 1977
- Barns, published in Monterey Life Magazine, November 1980
- Photo Mecca: The Carmel Mystique, published in Monterey Life Magazine, March 1981

=== Books edited ===
- The Years of Bitterness and Pride; FSA photographs 1935–1943; published by McGraw-Hill, New York, 1975

=== Books designed ===
- Jean Renoir; Essays, Conversations, Reviews, by Penelope Gilliat, published by McGraw-Hill 1975

=== Photographs published ===
- Portfolio, published in Monterey Life Magazine, August 1981
