= Alexinia Baldwin =

American educator (1925–2017)

Alexinia Young Baldwin
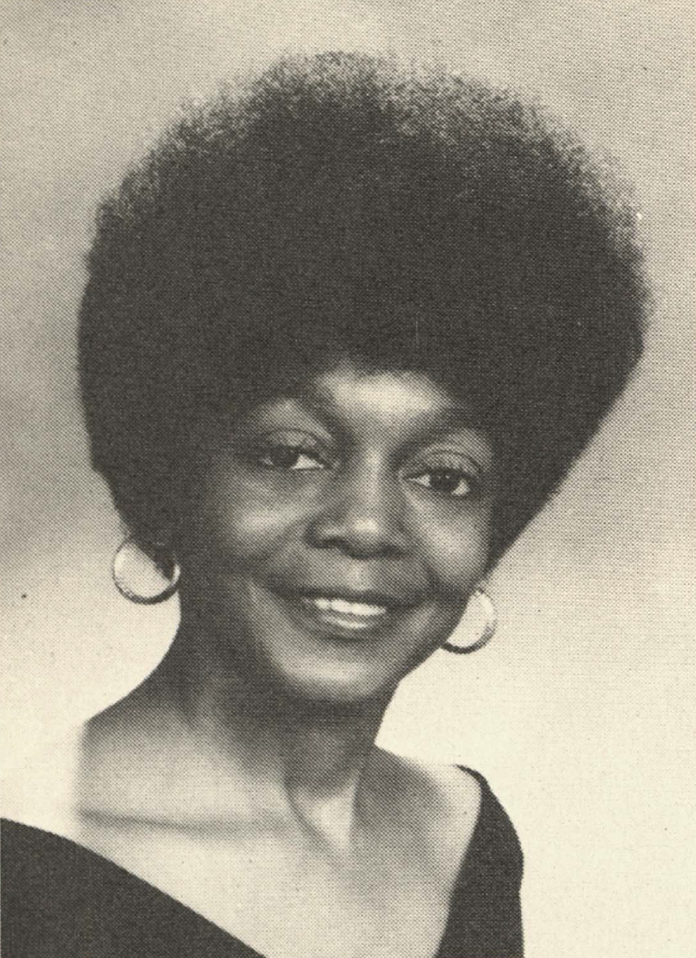
- Baldwin circa 1976
- Born: Alexinia Young Baldwin; February 3, 1925; Alabama, US
- Died: January 21, 2017 (aged 91); Mansfield, Connecticut, US
- Education: Tuskegee University, University of Michigan, University of Connecticut
- Occupations: Educator, author
- Employer(s): University of Connecticut, SUNY Albany

Alexinia Young Baldwin (February 3, 1925 – January 21, 2017) was an American educator and professor at the University of Connecticut who dedicated her research to the study of underserved gifted children. Baldwin is known for the creation of the Baldwin Identification Matrix, an assessment model for identifying giftedness in African American and other historically underrepresented students in gifted education.

== Biography ==
Alexinia Young Baldwin was born in Alabama on February 3, 1925. She received her B.S. from Tuskegee University, M.A. from University of Michigan, and Ph.D. from the Neag School of Education at the University of Connecticut. She taught in the first program for gifted African American students in Alabama.

In 1957, Alexinia Young Baldwin and her husband were successful in a civil liberties suit against the city of Birmingham, Alabama, after being arrested in a white waiting room at the Birmingham Train Terminal.

At the University of Connecticut's Neag School, Baldwin studied under Joseph Renzulli. After receiving her Ph.D. in 1971, Baldwin became a professor at University at Albany, SUNY. She returned to the University of Connecticut in 1988 and served as a professor at the Neag School until her retirement in 2003.

Baldwin served on the board of directors of the National Association for Gifted Children, president of the Association for the Gifted (1978–1979), and as a US delegate to the World Council for the Gifted and Talented (1981–2003).

Baldwin died on January 21, 2017, in Mansfield Center, Connecticut. She was 91 years old.

== Publications ==
- Baldwin Identification Matrix Inservice Kit for the Identification of Gifted & Talented Students (1977)
- Baldwin, Alexinia Y., and Wilma Vialle. The Many Faces of Giftedness: Lifting the Masks (1999)
- Culturally Diverse and Underserved Populations of Gifted Students (2004)
