= Wayne O. Manning =

American politician (1921–2017)

Member of the Florida House of Representatives from Holmes County
- In office 1957

Personal details
- Born: December 5, 1921 Ponce de Leon, Florida, U.S.
- Died: January 9, 2017 (aged 95)
- Party: Democratic
- Education: University of Florida

Wayne O. Manning (December 5, 1921 – January 9, 2017) was an American politician. He served as a Democratic member of the Florida House of Representatives.

== Life and career ==
Manning was born in Ponce de Leon, Florida. He attended the University of Florida and served in the United States Army during World War II.

Manning served in the Florida House of Representatives in 1957.

Manning died on January 9, 2017, at the age of 95.
