= Rupert Webb =

English cricketer (1922–2018)

Rupert Thomas Webb (11 July 1922 – 27 August 2018) was an English cricketer who played first-class cricket for Sussex from 1948 to 1960. He was born in Harrow, Middlesex.

Webb was Sussex's regular wicketkeeper between 1950 and 1958. In all, he played in 255 first-class matches for the county, plus one for the Marylebone Cricket Club in 1959 when he was no longer playing regularly for Sussex.
