= Kevin Casey (broadcaster) =

Irish radio presenter

- Born: 1976; Killarney, County Kerry
- Died: 3 January 2017 (aged 40–41); Dunmore East, Waterford
- Occupation: Sports Broadcaster / Journalist
- Known for: Broadcaster

Kevin Casey (1976 – 3 January 2017) was an Irish radio presenter, who primarily worked for WLR FM.

== Personal life ==
Casey was born in Killarney, County Kerry, and played for Glenflesk GAA. He died on 3 January 2017 of cancer. He had a wife and three children. His death was announced by WLR FM on 4 January 2017.

== Career ==
Casey worked primarily as a broadcaster for WLR FM, although he also worked as a freelancer for Raidió Teilifís Éireann, Newstalk 106 and Today FM. He covered the 1999 Rugby World Cup for RTE and The Irish World newspaper. He worked for two years as a sports editor for Radio Kerry, and later, in 2008, became the sports editor for WLR FM. In 2010, he won the GAA MacNamee award, named after Pádraig MacNamee, for his documentary on Waterford GAA's win at the 1959 All-Ireland Senior Football Championship. He also won the 2015 GAA MacNamee Award for Best GAA Related Radio Programme. His WLR FM documentary was on Maurice Shanahan, who had retired from GAA after suffering from depression, but had returned to win the 2015 All-Ireland Senior Football Championship. In October 2016, the documentary also won a PPI National Radio Award.
