= Thomas Joseph Simpson =

Canadian recipient of the Distinguished Service Medal

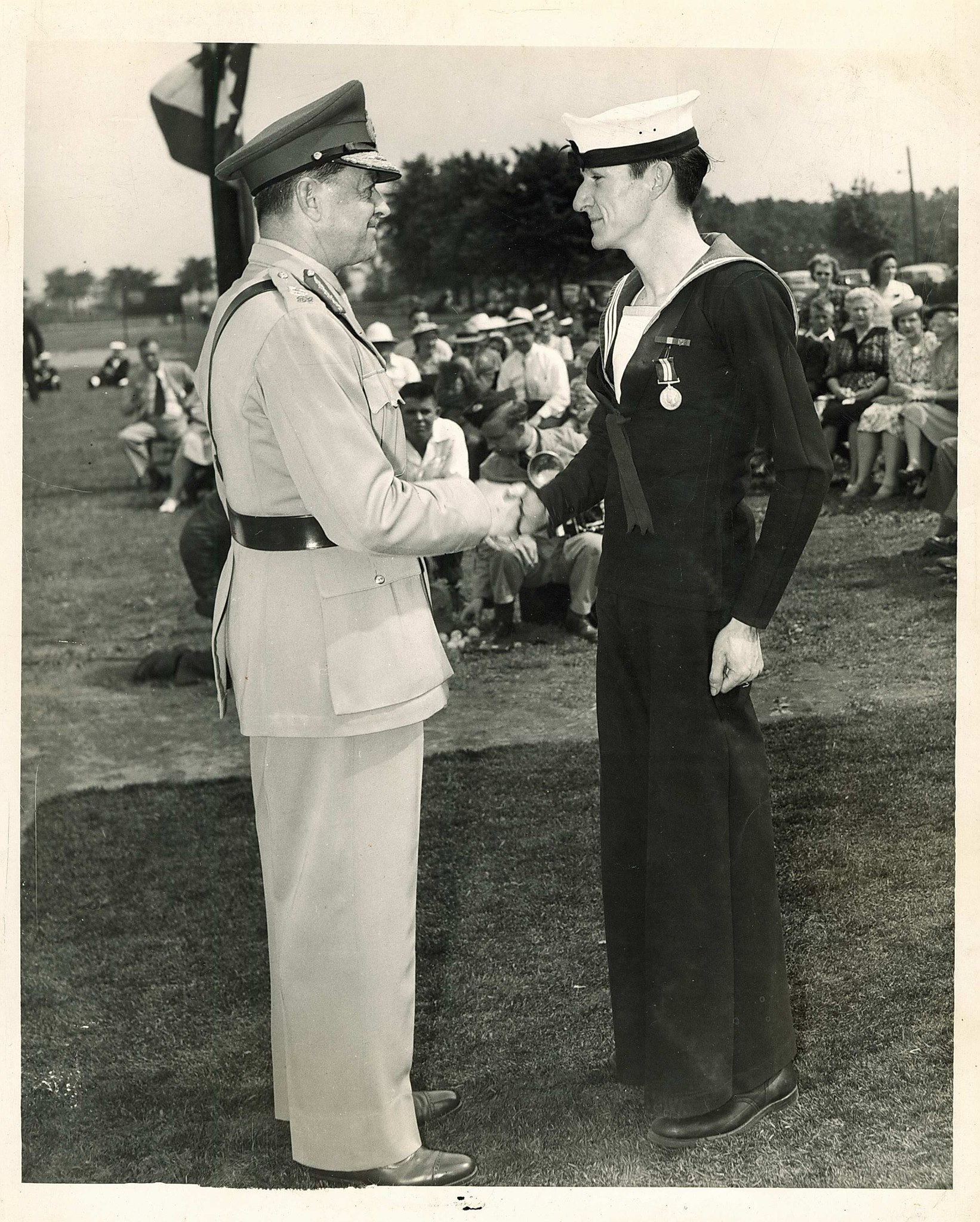
- Born: November 6, 1921; Windsor, Ontario
- Died: January 28, 2017 (aged 95); Windsor, Ontario
- Military career
- Allegiance: Canada
- Branch: Royal Canadian Navy
- Rank: Able seaman
- Service number: V-46636
- Conflicts: Battle of the Atlantic
- Awards: Distinguished Service Medal; Italy Star; France and Germany Star; 1939-1945 Star; Queen Elizabeth II Diamond Jubilee Medal

Thomas Joseph Simpson (November 6, 1921 – January 28, 2017) was one of the first radar operators in Royal Canadian Navy history. Simpson was credited with having "saved hundreds of lives by locating U-boat 1302" and a recipient of the Royal Navy's Distinguished Service Medal (United Kingdom).

== Role in sinking U-boat 1302 ==
His role in March 1945 helped sink the German U-boat 1302—that was fully loaded with 14 torpedoes—in St George's Channel between Ireland and the United Kingdom. Simpson, then 23, was aboard His Majesty's Canadian Ship HMCS La Hulloise, that was sailing with HMC ships Strathadam and Thetford Mines in Escort Group 25.

Their task was to protect a 31-ship convoy that was sailing from Halifax in Canada to England. Even though the Battle of the Atlantic was nearly over, the U-boats were still posing a constant threat there.

The Royal Canadian Navy website comments:

As one of the Royal Canadian Navy's (RCN) first radar operators, Simpson’s role in hunting U-boats was vital in keeping the shipping lanes open and the waters around the United Kingdom and Canada safe. His job required constant alertness for days on end, because at any moment a German torpedo could come racing silently from the depths.

At 3 a.m. on March 7, he picked up a radar contact in St George's Channel. He was twice dismissed by the officer of the watch. He spoke to the captain. On the captain ordering the 20-inch searchlight to check, a periscope and snorkel came into view. The subsequent attack is reported by the Royal Canadian Navy site. Some 48 submariners were lost, and Simpson was reported as being "haunted by his actions for years". Yet,

On the other hand, he had been instrumental in saving hundreds of lives that night as his attention to duty ended the reign of terror by U-boat 1302.

Returning to Liverpool, England, Simpson was called before the Admiralty Board and questioned about the events and, specifically, his actions during his watch that night. The Royal Canadian Navy recommended Simpson for a Mention in Dispatches, but the Royal Navy opted for higher recognition. George Simpson, Commodore Western Approaches, and a decorated submariner, described Simpson’s role as “an outstanding piece of work.” “The detection of the periscope and the snorkel was invaluable in the successful prosecution of the attack.”

== Service history ==
Simpson enlisted in the Royal Canadian Navy at HMCS Hunter in Windsor, Ontario, as a radar operator during the Second World War in 1942. He trained as a radar operator in Esquimalt, British Columbia, and later Halifax, Nova Scotia, before serving on the corvette HMCS Shawinigan and frigates HMCS Toronto, and HMCS La Hulloise in the Battle of the Atlantic. He died on January 28, 2017.

== Awards ==
On March 7, 1945, La Hulloise along with two other Canadian River-class frigates, Strathadam and Thetford Mines, sank the German submarine U-1302 (originally thought to be U-775) in the St George's Channel. In August the event was recognised by the awarding of medals to a number of the officers and men of the three frigates, Simpson included.

He was one of the 114 Canadians to receive the Distinguished Service Medal (DSM) for World War II service.
