= Abdul Hafeez Lakho =

- Born: 10 May 1928; Karachi, Pakistan
- Died: 7 January 2017 (aged 88); Karachi, Pakistan
- Occupation: Lawyer
- Political party: Pakistan Peoples Party

Abdul Hafeez Lakho (1928–2017) was a Pakistani lawyer and defence lawyer of former prime minister Zulfikar Ali Bhutto. He died at the age of 87.

He briefly served as a pilot in Pakistan Air Force but later resigned to pursue a career as a lawyer. He was a political activist and supporter of Zulfikar Ali Bhutto. He was awarded the highest civilian award of Sitara-e-Imtiaz in recognition of his services for the protection of human rights in the 1990s.

== Award ==
- Sitara-e-Imtiaz, for protection of human rights.
