= Mario Reading =

British author

Mario Gilbert Priester-Reading (10 August 1953 – 29 January 2017) was a British author.

Reading was born in Bournemouth in 1953, son of Gordon and Lieselotte Reading. He was brought up in England, Germany, and the South of France, and educated at Rugby School and at the University of East Anglia, where he studied Comparative Literature under Malcolm Bradbury and Angus Wilson.

His novels include The Music-Makers, and the bestselling Antichrist Trilogy (which has sold more than a million copies in 39 countries), comprising The Nostradamus Prophecies, The Mayan Codex, and The Third Antichrist. His newest series of novels features photojournalist John "The Templar" Hart: The Templar Prophecy came out in 2014, The Templar Inheritance in April 2015, and The Templar Succession, appeared in April 2016.

After years of battling cancer, Reading died on 29 January 2017.

== Novels ==
- The Music-Makers
- The Nostradamus Prophecies
- The Mayan Codex
- The Third Antichrist
- The Templar Prophecy
- The Templar Inheritance
- The Templar Succession
- The Occupation Secret

== Non-Fiction ==
- The Dictionary Of Cinema
- The Movie Companion
- The Watkins Dictionary Of Dreams
- Nostradamus: The Complete Prophecies For The Future
- Nostradamus: The Good News
- The Complete Prophecies Of Nostradamus
- Nostradamus: The Top 100 Prophecies
