= William Lacy Carter =

American politician and businessman

William Lacy Carter Jr. (December 2, 1925 – January 25, 2017) was an American politician and businessman.

Born in Memphis, Tennessee, Carter served in the United States Navy during World War II and the Korean War. Carter owned a beer distributorship in Chattanooga, Tennessee. From 1971 to 1974, Carter served in the Tennessee House of Representatives and was a Republican. Carter died at his home in Chattanooga, Tennessee.
