= Adele Howe =

American computer scientist

Adele E. Howe (1961 – January 20, 2017) was an American computer scientist specializing in artificial intelligence. She was one of the developers of the Planning Domain Definition Language for automated planning and scheduling, and was also known for her work on metasearch engines. She was a Professor Laureate in the College of Natural Sciences at Colorado State University.

== Education and career ==
Howe majored in computer science and engineering at the University of Pennsylvania, graduating in 1983. She went to the University of Massachusetts Amherst for graduate study in computer and information science, earning a master's degree in 1987 and completing her Ph.D. in 1993.

She joined Colorado State University as an assistant professor in 1992, earned tenure as an associate professor in 1998, and was promoted to full professor in 2003. She was named Professor Laureate in 2010.

== Recognition ==
Howe was named a Fellow of the Association for the Advancement of Artificial Intelligence (AAAI) in 2015. In 2016, the International Conference on Automated Planning and Scheduling (ICAPS) gave Howe their inaugural Distinguished Service Award.
