= Harald Friedrich =

German physicist

Harald Friedrich (19 May 1947 – 29 January 2017) was a German physicist specializing in theoretical atomic physics.

Friedrich was born in Berlin and grew up in Australia. He studied physics at Kiel University and the University of Freiburg, and completed his doctoral studies in 1975 at the University of Münster with a dissertation on the microscopic description of the scattering of light and medium-weight nuclei. Subsequently, he was a postdoctoral student at the University of Oxford. In 1980, he habilitated as a professor at the University of Münster and was at Caltech from 1981 to 1983 on a Heisenberg scholarship. He taught at LMU Munich and the University of Tübingen before becoming a professor at the Technical University of Munich in 1987.

Among other institutions, he was a guest lecturer at the Institute for Theoretical Atomic Physics at the Center for Astrophysics | Harvard & Smithsonian and at the Australian National University in Canberra.

Friedrich initially dealt with theoretical nuclear physics before switching to atomic physics. In the 1980s, he studied quantum chaos phenomena in highly excited atoms and their semi-classical treatment, in part with his doctoral student Dieter Wintgen. He is also well-known through his textbook on theoretical atomic physics.

== Publications ==
- Friedrich, Harald; Trost, Johannes (2004). "Working with WKB waves far from the semiclassical limit". Physics Reports. 397 (6). Elsevier BV: 359–449. Bibcode:2004PhR...397..359F. doi:10.1016/j.physrep.2004.04.001. ISSN 0370-1573.
- Friedrich, Harald; Jacoby, Georg; Meister, Carlo G. (27 February 2002). "Quantum reflection by Casimir–van der Waals potential tails". Physical Review A. 65 (3) 032902. American Physical Society (APS). Bibcode:2002PhRvA..65c2902F. doi:10.1103/physreva.65.032902. ISSN 1050-2947.
- Friedrich, Harald; Wintgen, Hieter (1989). "The hydrogen atom in a uniform magnetic field — An example of chaos". Physics Reports. 183 (2). Elsevier BV: 37–79. Bibcode:1989PhR...183...37F. doi:10.1016/0370-1573(89)90121-x. ISSN 0370-1573.
- Buck, B.; Friedrich, H.; Wheatley, C. (1977). "Local potential models for the scattering of complex nuclei". Nuclear Physics A. 275 (1). Elsevier BV: 246–268. Bibcode:1977NuPhA.275..246B. doi:10.1016/0375-9474(77)90287-1. ISSN 0375-9474.
- Friedrich, Harald (1990). Theoretische Atomphysik (in German). BerlinHeidelbergNew YorkLondonParisTokyoHong KongBarcelona: Springer. ISBN 3-540-52982-9. OCLC 75171621.
  - English edition: Friedrich, Harald (2017). Theoretical atomic physics. Cham, Switzerland: Springer. ISBN 978-3-319-47769-5. OCLC 987617695.
- Friedrich, Harald (1997). Classical, semiclassical and quantum dynamics in atoms. Berlin New York: Springer. ISBN 3-540-63004-X. OCLC 37011235..
