= Ronald Kent Campbell =

American politician

Member of the Kansas House of Representatives
- In office 1985–1992

Personal details
- Born: July 15, 1934 Cloud County, Kansas, U.S.
- Died: January 24, 2017 (aged 82) Colorado Springs, Colorado, U.S.
- Party: Democratic

Ronald Kent Campbell (July 15, 1934 – January 24, 2017), also known as Kent Campbell, was an American politician. He served as a Democratic member of the Kansas House of Representatives.

== Life and career ==
Campbell was born in Cloud County, Kansas.

Campbell served in the Kansas House of Representatives from 1985 to 1992.

Campbell died on January 24, 2017, in Colorado Springs, Colorado, at the age of 82.
