= Mario R. Ramil =

American judge

Associate Justice of the Supreme Court of Hawaii
- In office 1993–2002

Personal details
- Born: June 21, 1946 Novaliches, Quezon City, Philippines
- Died: January 30, 2017 (aged 70)
- Cause of death: Cancer
- Spouse: Judy
- Children: 2
- Education: California State University, Hayward; University of California, Hastings College of the Law (JD)
- Profession: Judge

Mario R. Ramil (June 21, 1946 – January 30, 2017) was an associate justice of the Hawaii State Supreme Court and was the second Filipino American in the United States to rise to the office. He served his tenure from 1993 to 2002.

Ramil was born and raised in the Novaliches, Quezon City, Philippines. Ramil's family immigrated to the San Francisco Bay Area when he was ten years old. He received his bachelor's degree in 1972 from California State University, Hayward and his Juris Doctor (J.D.) degree in 1975 from University of California Hastings College of the Law. He moved to Hawaii in 1975 upon graduation from Hastings and joined the Attorney General's office, becoming Deputy Attorney General a year later. He became the state's insurance commissioner in the early 1980s, Director of Labor in 1987, and in 1993 was sworn in as an associate justice of the Supreme Court. In 2002, he retired from his post, after two decades in public service, and entered private practice at Imanaka, Kudo and Fujimoto. Ramil was married to wife Judy, and two children, Jon and Bradley. Ramil died from cancer.
