= Bernard Redmont =

American journalist (1918–2017)

- Born: Bernard Rothenberg; November 8, 1918; New York City, U.S.
- Died: January 23, 2017 (aged 98)
- Education: City College of New York; Columbia University Graduate School of Journalism (MS)
- Occupation: Journalist

Bernard Sidney Redmont (November 8, 1918 – January 23, 2017) was an American journalist and Professor of Journalism and later Dean of the College of Communication at Boston University.

== Education and early career ==
Born Bernard Rothenberg in New York City, Redmont earned his bachelor's degree at the City College of New York (CCNY), Redmont received an M.S. from the Columbia University Graduate School of Journalism in 1939 and was awarded the school's highest honor, the Pulitzer Traveling Fellowship. He began his work in the profession of journalism at the old Brooklyn Daily Eagle at the age of 18. Redmont was a reporter and telegraph editor on the Herkimer, NY Evening Telegram in 1940 and 1941. After World War II broke out, he enlisted in the Marines and served as a Combat Correspondent in the Marshall Islands. During and immediately after the war, he served as head of the News Division of the Office of the Coordinator of Inter-American Affairs (OCIAA), sometimes known as "the Rockefeller Agency."

== Foreign correspondent in Latin America and Europe ==
Redmont, who has a reading and speaking knowledge of French and Spanish, began his work as a foreign correspondent during his Pulitzer Traveling Fellowship in Europe and later in Mexico City. He was bureau chief for World Report (later U.S. News & World Report), in Buenos Aires in the late 1940s, during the dictatorship of Juan Peron and his wife Evita Peron, and Paris in the early 1950s. Continuing his reporting from Paris, he was head of the English desk of the Agence France-Presse for many years. In 1961, Redmont served as President of the Anglo-American Press Association.

== Broadcasting career as a foreign correspondent ==
Redmont's broadcasting career began with the Canadian Broadcasting Corporation (CBC) and continued with Westinghouse Broadcasting Corporation (Group W). During his time as Paris correspondent for Group W, he was granted an interview by a leading North Vietnamese diplomat in Paris, breaking the story which led to the Paris peace negotiations. Redmont also covered the rise and fall of Charles De Gaulle, the Prague Spring and Soviet invasion of Czechoslovakia, the Six-Day War and the Yom Kippur War, and the struggles for human rights of Andrei Sakharov, Anatoly Sharansky, and other Soviet dissidents. He covered other major stories in Europe, the Middle East, Latin America, and the former USSR. Redmont was Bureau Chief for CBS News and reported on both radio and television from Moscow (1976–1979) and Paris (1980–1981).

== Career in journalism education ==
After his return to the United States in the early 1980s, Redmont became Professor of Journalism and later Dean of the College of Communication at Boston University and served there through the 1980s. He is now Dean Emeritus of the College of Communication. During his academic career, he lectured widely in the U.S., France, Britain, Italy, Morocco, Russia, and China. Redmont is the author of Risks Worth Taking: The Odyssey of a Foreign Correspondent (University Press of America, 1992). He contributed regularly to the now-defunct Television Quarterly. He has become active in both the Executive Service Corps of New England and the International Executive Service Corps, offering volunteer consulting in public relations and strategic planning services to nonprofit organizations and offering journalism training to television stations in newly democratized Bulgaria and Albania after the fall of the Iron Curtain.

== Honors and awards ==
Redmont is a decorated (Purple Heart) veteran of World War II during which he served as a Combat Correspondent in the U.S Marine Corps in the Marshall Islands. He received the 1973 Overseas Press Club of America (OPC) Award for Best Radio Reporting from Abroad for his Vietnam Peace Talks story. He had received a previous award from the OPC in 1968 for his coverage of the Six-Day War in 1967. Redmont holds an honorary degree (Doctor of Humane Letters) from Florida International University. He received the Columbia University Alumni Award "for the advancement of responsible journalism in all its forms" in 1986 and the City College of New York Townsend Harris Medal "for distinguished contributions in his chosen field of work and to the welfare of his fellow men" in 1991. Redmont was awarded the Legion of Honour in 1973 by French President Georges Pompidou. In January 2011, he was promoted from "Chevalier" (Knight) to "Officier" (Officer) of the Legion of Honour by French President Nicolas Sarkozy.

== Sources ==
- Who's Who in America, 2009 and previous editions
- Who's Who in American Education, 2009 and previous editions
- American Society of the French Legion of Honor Newsletter Vol. 11 #2 (2004), p. 2.
- Biographies issued by CBS News 1976–81 and by Group W Westinghouse Broadcasting 1960–1976.
- News release, Boston University Office of Public Relations, 1982.
- Bernard S. Redmont, Risks Worth Taking: The Odyssey of a Foreign Correspondent (University Press of America, 1992)
