= Cheick Fantamady Camara =

Guinean film director

- Born: 1960; Conakry, Guinea
- Died: January 7, 2017 (aged 57)
- Citizenship: Guinean
- Education: Institut national de l'audiovisuel École nationale supérieure Louis-Lumière
- Occupation: Film director
- Years active: 2000-2017
- Awards: Il va pleuvoir sur Conakry won the 2007 Panafrican Film and Television Festival of Ouagadougou

Cheick Fantamady Camara (1960 – January 7, 2017) was an award-winning Guinean film director. He was the director of two short films and two feature films. His 2006 film Il va pleuvoir sur Conakry won the 2007 Panafrican Film and Television Festival of Ouagadougou in Burkina Faso and the 2008 Prix Ousmane Sembène at the Khouribga African Cinema Festival in Morocco.

== Early life ==
Cheick Fantamady Camara was born in 1960 in Conakry, Guinea. While living in France in his 40s, he took a course in screenwriting at the Institut national de l'audiovisuel, graduating in 1997. A year later, in 1998, he studied film directing at the École nationale supérieure Louis-Lumière.

== Career ==
Camara began by directing two short films: Konorofili in 2000 and Bé Kunko in 2004. He subsequently directed two feature films: Il va pleuvoir sur Conakry in 2006 and Morbayssa in 2010.

Camara won the Prix RFI du Public at the 2007 Panafrican Film and Television Festival of Ouagadougou in Burkina Faso and the 2008 Prix Ousmane Sembène at the Khouribga African Cinema Festival in Morocco for Il va pleuvoir sur Conakry.

== Death ==
Camara died on January 7, 2017, at the age of 57.
