= Culture of South Dakota =

The culture of the U.S. state of South Dakota exhibits influences from many different sources. American Indians, the cultures of the American West and Midwest, and the customs and traditions of many of the state's various immigrant groups have all contributed to South Dakota art, music, and literature.

== Roots and influences ==
Much of South Dakota's culture reflects the state's American Indian, rural, Western, and European roots.

== Festivals ==
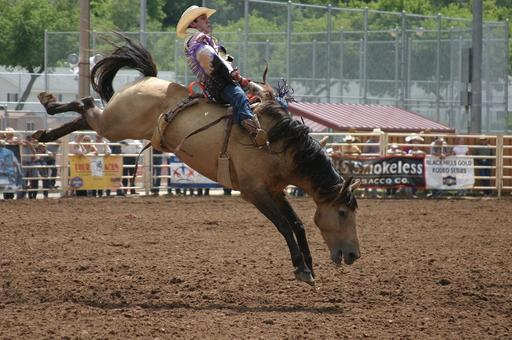
A rodeo at Days of '76 in Deadwood.

A number of annual events celebrating the state's ethnic and historical heritage take place around the state, such as Days of '76 in Deadwood, Czech Days in Tabor, the annual St. Patrick's Day and Cinco de Mayo festivities in Sioux Falls, and Riverboat Days in Yankton. Many pow wows are held yearly throughout the state, and Custer State Park's Buffalo Roundup, in which volunteers on horseback gather the park's herd of around 1,500 bison, is a popular annual event.

Annual arts and crafts festivals include the Brookings Summer Arts Festival and the Sidewalk Arts Festival in downtown Sioux Falls.

In the annual Crazy Horse Volksmarch near Custer, nearly 15,000 hikers complete a 6.2 miles (10.0 km) hike that nears the top of the Crazy Horse Memorial.

Many counties and towns in the state hold annual fairs. The Sioux Empire Fair, in Sioux Falls, is the largest fair in the state, with an annual attendance of over 250,000. The South Dakota State Fair is another large annual event; it is held in Huron at the end of the summer.

The Sturgis Motorcycle Rally is an annual event in Sturgis. In 2006, the rally was attended by 450,000 people.

== Literature ==
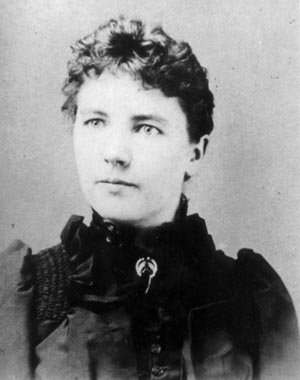
Author Laura Ingalls Wilder used her experiences growing up near De Smet as the basis for four of her novels.

Laura Ingalls Wilder, whose semi-autobiographical books center around her experiences as a child and young adult on the frontier, is one of South Dakota's best-known writers. She used her experiences growing up on a homestead near De Smet as the basis for four of her novels: By the Shores of Silver Lake, The Long Winter, Little Town on the Prairie, and The First Four Years. Wilder's childhood home, built by her father, has been preserved and is open to the public in De Smet.

Another author from the state who wrote about the area's early period of settlement was Ole Edvart Rølvaag. Rølvaag was a Norwegian immigrant who came to Elk Point to work as a farm hand in 1896, later studying English at Augustana College (at the time located in Canton). Rølvaag later wrote a number of novels, many of which centered on the struggles of immigrants in Dakota to simultaneously make a living and preserve their heritage in a foreign country. Rølvaag's novels include Giants of the Earth: A Saga of the Prairie, Peder Victorious, and Their Fathers' God.

Novelist Frederick Manfred, who identified as "Siouxland" a region encompassing western Iowa, southern Minnesota, and eastern South Dakota, set a number of his novels in South Dakota, including The Golden Bowl (Manfred) (during the Dust Bowl) and King of Spades (during the Black Hills Gold Rush).

Black Elk, whose narration of the Indian Wars and Ghost Dance movement and thoughts on Native American religion forms the basis of the book Black Elk Speaks.

Paul Goble, a native of England who has lived in Rapid City since 1977, is an author and illustrator of children's books, most of which involve American Indian topics. He has published 29 books, and was awarded the Caldecott Medal for The Girl Who Loved Wild Horses and a Regina Medal for his body of work.

== Painting and illustrating ==
The work of some of the oldest painters and artists in South Dakota can be seen in the numerous petroglyphs in many areas of the state, particularly in the Black Hills. Some of these paintings and carvings are between 3,000 and 5,000 years old. The petroglyphs may be classified as painted, incised (scratched into the stone), or pecked (chipped out of the stone). Most of the scenes either depict humans with their arms raised or animal subjects. Although most of the evidence of the culture and identity of these early artists has long since disappeared, the styles used in the petroglyphs bear numerous similarities with later cultures, even as recent as contemporary Sioux artwork.

Beginning in the 1830s several painters and illustrators began producing paintings and sketchs of the area and inhabitants around Fort Pierre. One of the first non-Indian artists in the area, George Catlin arrived in the area in 1832 and completed a number of sketches and portraits of local tribes, Indian dances, and bison hunts during the 15 days he spent at Ft. Pierre. Several years later, Swiss artist Karl Bodmer traveled up the Missouri River and for a time lived among the tribes of central South Dakota. During this period, Bodmer completed a number of highly detailed landscapes and portraits of local Indians.

Harvey Dunn grew up on a homestead near Manchester in the late 19th century. After attending college at South Dakota State University, Dunn enjoyed a successful career as an illustrator for periodicals such as Harper's and The Saturday Evening Post. While most of his career was spent as an illustrator whose work rarely recalled his rural upbringing, late in life Dunn completed a number of paintings depicting his memories of life in rural Dakota Territory. Dunn agreed to exhibit these painting, mostly depicting scenes of frontier life, at an exhibition in De Smet in 1950. The exhibition was a great success, with over 5,000 people attending it throughout the summer, and Dunn agreed to donate the works to South Dakota State. They are currently displayed at the South Dakota Art Museum on the campus of SDSU in Brookings.

Oscar Howe was born on the Crow Creek Indian Reservation and won fame for his watercolor paintings. Howe was one of the first Native American painters to produce works heavily influenced by abstraction, as opposed to ones relying on more traditional styles.

There are currently several accomplished artists from South Dakota. Terry Redlin, originally from Watertown, is a painter of rural and wildlife scenes. Many of Redlin's works are on display at the Redlin Art Center in Watertown. Dick Termes, who resides in Spearfish, is renowned for his Termespheres. They are scenes painted on a sphere that can be viewed from any angle. He credits M. C. Escher and Buckminster Fuller as having strong influences on his work.

== See also ==
- List of people from South Dakota
