= South Dakota Magazine =

- Editor: Katie Hunhoff
- Frequency: Bimonthly
- Founded: 1985
- Country: United States
- Based in: Yankton, South Dakota
- Language: English
- Website: southdakotamagazine.com
- ISSN: 0886-2680

South Dakota Magazine is a bi-monthly magazine publication that explores the culture, events, history, characters, landscape and communities of South Dakota. Bernie Hunhoff founded the magazine in 1985 after several years in the newspaper business. His daughter, Katie Hunhoff, is now the editor and publisher. The magazine has also produced several books featuring South Dakota stories, photography, and interesting places.

The magazine headquarters are located at 410 E 3rd St in Yankton, South Dakota, in a historic brick building built in the 1870s by Dakota Territorial Governor John L. Pennington.

Bernie Hunhoff and South Dakota Magazine have been recognized with numerous awards for their efforts in promoting South Dakota, including the 2011 A.H. Pankow Award and the South Dakota Humanities Council's award for Distinguished Achievement in the Humanities.
