= Upper Midwest =

Region in the northern portion of the Midwestern United States

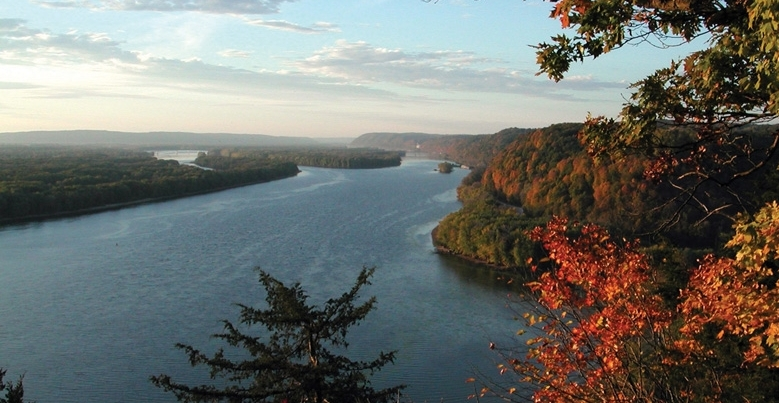
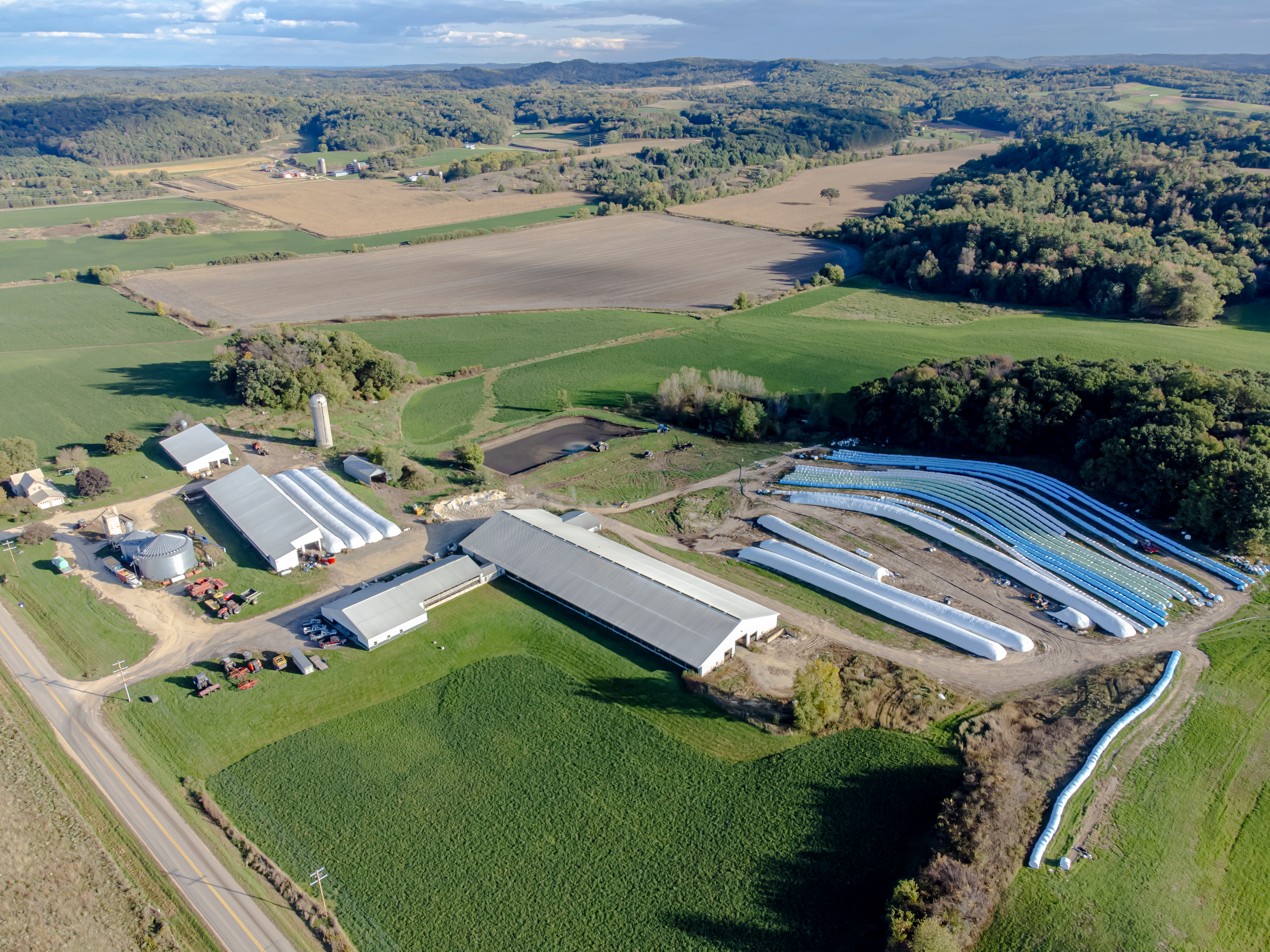
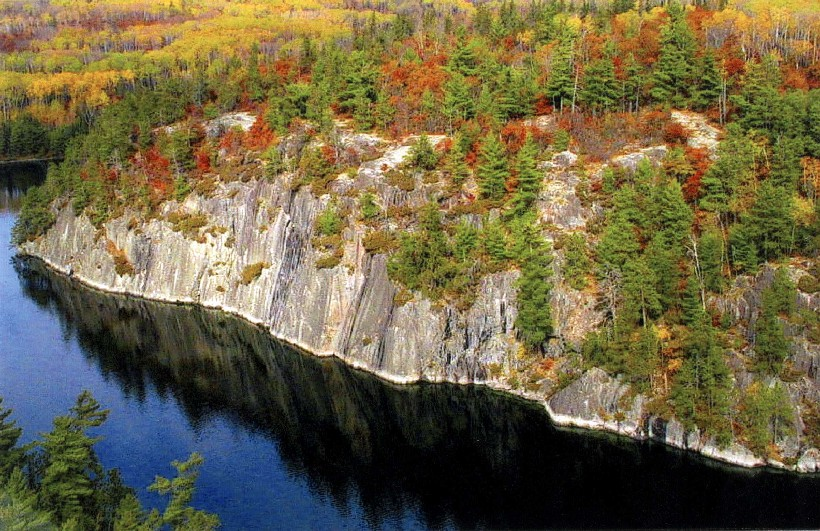
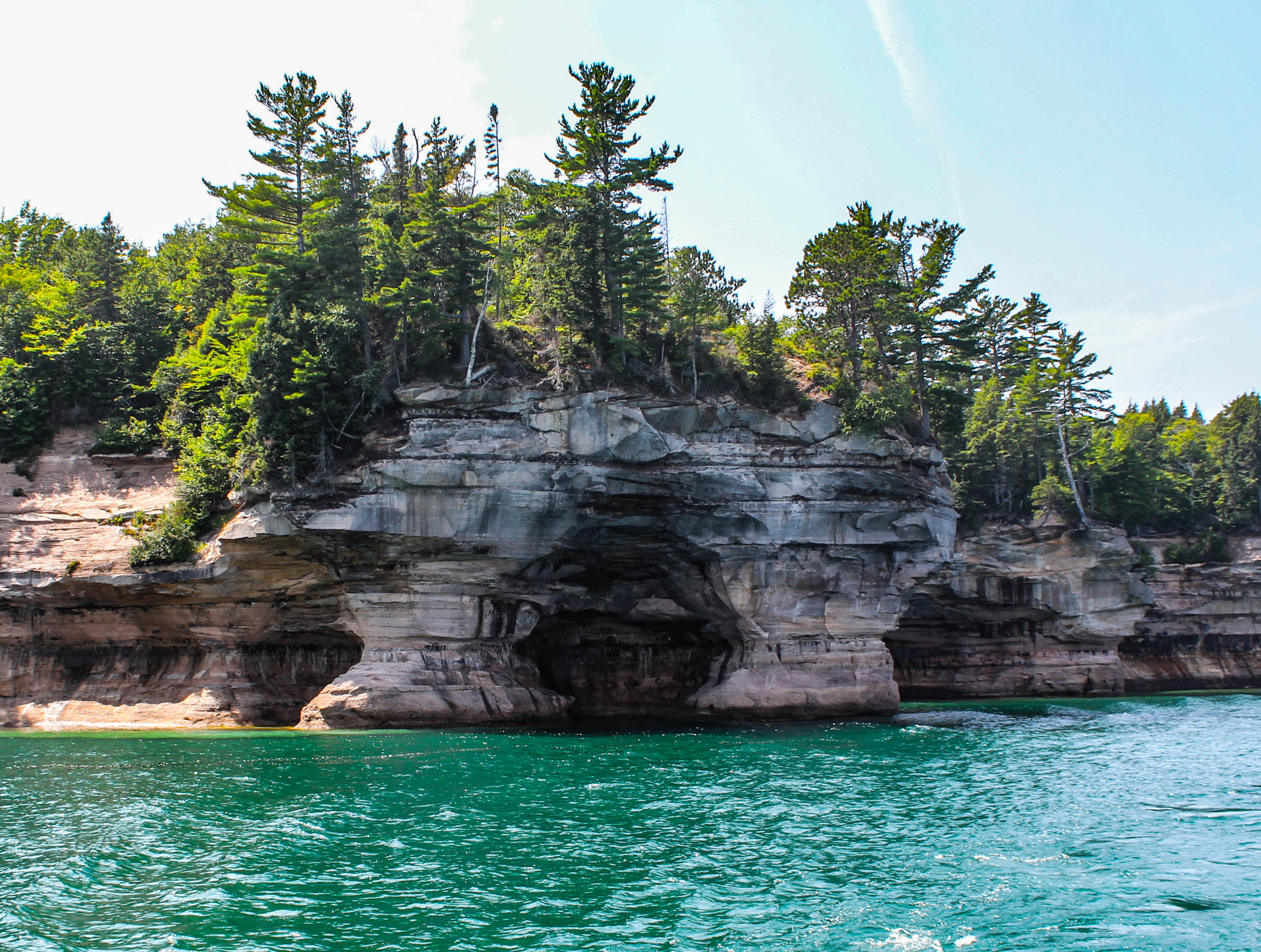
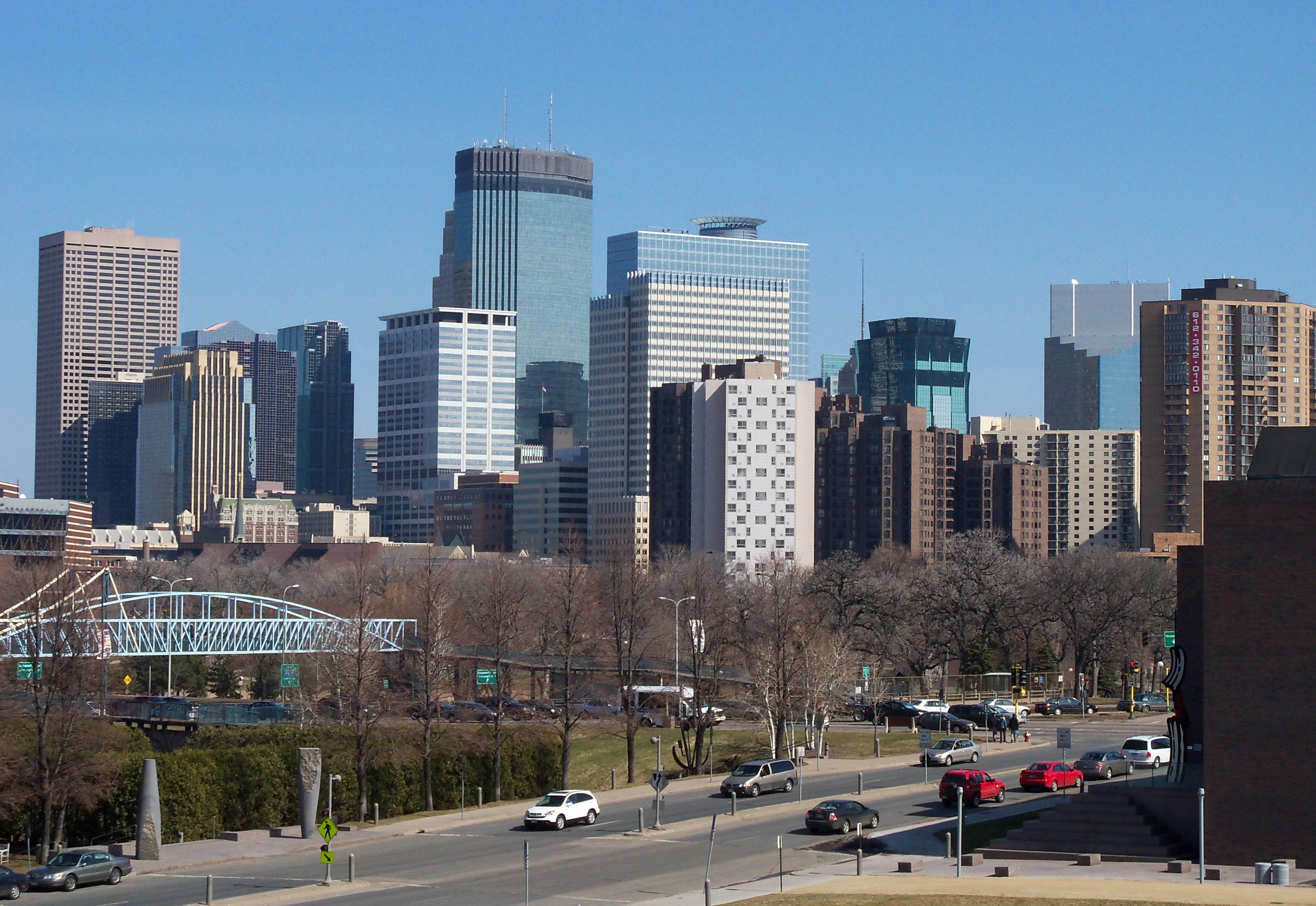
- Mississippi River viewed from Effigy Mounds National Monument in Iowa Dairy Farm in Wisconsin Voyageurs National Park Sheyenne National Grassland Pictured Rocks National Lakeshore Detroit Minneapolis

- Map of the United States with the Upper Midwest highlighted (as defined by the National Weather Service)
- Demonym: Upper Midwesterner

The Upper Midwest is a northern subregion of the U.S. Census Bureau's Midwestern United States. Although the exact boundaries are not uniformly agreed upon, the region is usually defined to include the states of Iowa, Michigan, Minnesota and Wisconsin, North Dakota, and South Dakota; some definitions include parts of Nebraska and Illinois.

== Definitions ==
The National Centers for Environmental Information considers the Upper Midwest climate region to include Iowa, Michigan, Minnesota, and Wisconsin.

The United States Geological Survey uses two different Upper Midwest regions:

- The USGS Upper Midwest Environmental Sciences Center considers it to be the six states of Illinois, Indiana, Iowa, Michigan, Minnesota and Wisconsin, which comprise the watersheds of the Upper Mississippi River and upper Great Lakes.
- The USGS Mineral Resources Program considers the area to contain Illinois, Indiana, Michigan, Minnesota and Wisconsin.

The Association for Institutional Research in the Upper Midwest includes the states of Iowa, Minnesota, North Dakota, South Dakota, Wisconsin and the upper peninsula of Michigan in the region. According to the Library of Congress, the Upper Midwest includes the states of Minnesota, Wisconsin and Michigan.

== Climate ==
The region has dramatic variations between summer and winter temperatures: summers are hot, and winters are very cold. For example, Sioux Falls averages 25 days each year with temperatures above 90 °F (32 °C) and 45 days each year with temperatures below 5 °F (−15 °C). Mitchell, South Dakota has a record high of 116 °F (47 °C) and a record low of −39 °F (−39 °C).

The growing season is shorter, cooler and drier in areas farther north and west. The region's western boundary is sometimes considered to be determined by where the climate becomes too dry to support growing non-irrigated crops other than small grains or hay grass.

== Dialect ==
The Inland North dialect, most prominently characterized by the Northern Cities Vowel Shift, is centered in the eastern part of the Upper Midwest, including Wisconsin, Michigan and the northern parts of Illinois and Ohio; it extends beyond the Midwest into Central and Western New York. North Central American English (also known as "Upper Midwestern"), is spoken in Minnesota, parts of Wisconsin and Iowa, the Upper Peninsula of Michigan, portions of Montana and the Dakotas. The Upper Midwestern monophthong is attributed to the high degree of Scandinavian and German immigration to the region in the late nineteenth century.

== Politics ==
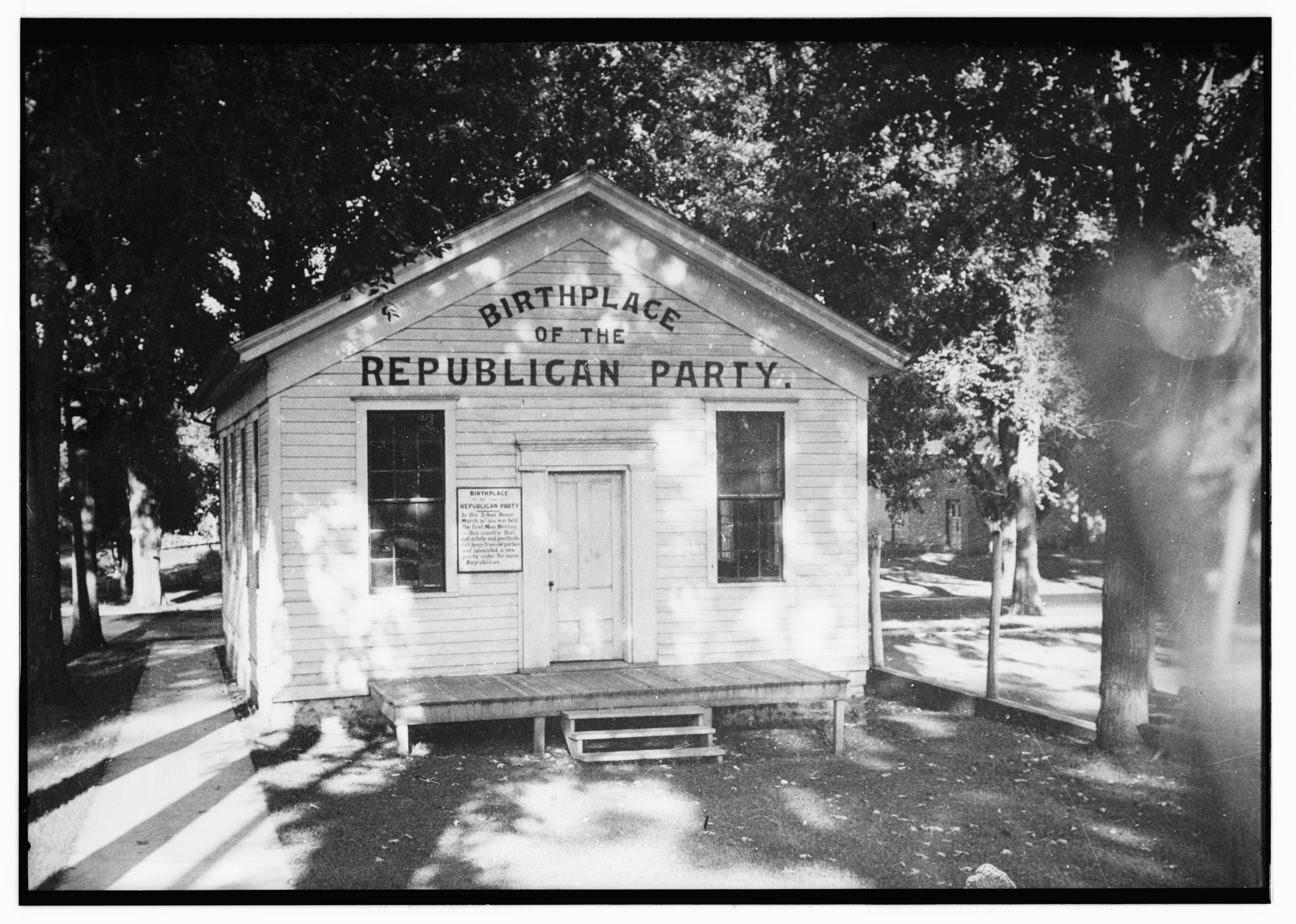
The upper Midwest, particularly Wisconsin, was the birthplace of the Republican Party. (An old photo of the Little White Schoolhouse)

The Upper Midwest in the 20th-century was dominated by the Republican Party and was the heartland of the early Progressive movement, the region supporting Theodore Roosevelt's Progressive Party of 1912 and Robert La Follette's Progressive party of 1924.

During the 1930s and 1940s the Upper Midwestern States were dominated by third parties such as the Minnesota Farmer-Labor party, Wisconsin Progressive Party, and the North Dakotan Nonpartisan League. In 1938, the National Progressives of America emerged out of the Wisconsin Progressive Party.

The region continues to be favorable to the Democratic Party and moderate Republicans, with Minnesota favoring each Democratic presidential candidate since 1976 and Wisconsin from 1988 to 2012 (and again in 2020). Minnesota narrowly supported native Walter Mondale in 1984 in an election where Ronald Reagan won every other state. Michigan and Illinois also often favor Democratic candidates. However, beginning with the 2010 midterm elections, Republicans experienced substantial gains in state legislative and executive offices in Iowa, Minnesota, Wisconsin, and Michigan. This trend continued through 2016. From 2018, Democrats regained some control of the region. Upper Midwest states closest to the Great Lakes favor Democrats, and Democratic state trifecta governments formed in Minnesota and Michigan in 2022, though both were broken in 2024. Great Plains states in the region continue to favor Republicans, with GOP state trifecta governments in the Dakota's and Iowa. In 2023, the region had three Democratic governors (in Minnesota, Michigan, and Wisconsin) and three Republican governors (in North Dakota, South Dakota, and Iowa).

In the 2020 presidential election, Democrat Joe Biden won the electoral votes of the Blue Wall states of Wisconsin, Michigan, and Minnesota. Republican Donald Trump won the electoral votes of Iowa, North Dakota, and South Dakota.

Every American state elects two U.S. senators to a six-year term. After the November 2020 election, Minnesota and Michigan had two Democratic senators, while North Dakota, South Dakota and Iowa had two Republican senators. Wisconsin is the only state in the Upper Midwest that has elected one Republican and one Democratic senator.

== Industry and tourism ==
The economy of the region was largely based upon the mining of iron and copper, as well as a very large timber industry. Mechanization has sharply reduced employment in those areas, and the economy is increasingly based on tourism. Popular interest in the environment and environmentalism, added to traditional interests in hunting and fishing, has attracted a large urban audience who live within driving range.

=== Agriculture ===
A harvest in South Dakota, 1898, Corn Belt.

The USDA reported that corn, soybean, sunflower and sugar beet crops saw harvest gains in 2018, but were still below the five-year averages. In North Dakota, for example, 49% of corn was harvested by November 4 compared with the five-year average of 97%. This was in part due to weather conditions in October that affected the harvest.

== See also ==
- Louisiana (New France)
- North Star
- Northern Tier (United States)
- 100th meridian west
- Siouxland
- Northwoods
- Rust Belt
- Culture:
  - Culture of Iowa
  - Culture of Michigan
  - Culture of Minnesota
  - Culture of North Dakota
  - Culture of South Dakota
  - Culture of Wisconsin
- NFC North, a National Football League division encompassing three of the four teams in the region
