= List of people from Rapid City, South Dakota =

The following is a list of people who were born in, residents of, or otherwise closely associated with Rapid City, South Dakota, and its surrounding metropolitan area, including Meade County, South Dakota, and Pennington County, South Dakota.

- James Abourezk, born in Wood, South Dakota; US representative and senator
- Maxine Asher, born in Chicago, Illinois; head of the controversial American World University, formerly based in Rapid City
- Ellis Yarnal Berry, born in Larchwood, Iowa; newspaper publisher; US representative
- John Boland, born in Rapid City; mayor of Rapid City, South Dakota senator, and businessman
- Joseph H. Bottum, born in Faulkton, South Dakota; former US senator
- Moses Brings Plenty, born on the Pine Ridge Indian Reservation; Lakota Sioux actor
- Mark Cady, born in Rapid City; chief justice of the Iowa Supreme Court
- Raymond W. Carpenter, United States Army major general; acting director of the Army National Guard
- Francis H. Case, born in Everly, Iowa; former columnist for the Rapid City Journal; US representative
- Charles J. Chaput, born in Concordia, Kansas; fourth Roman Catholic bishop of Rapid City
- Brandon Claussen, born in Rapid City, Major League Baseball pitcher with the Washington Nationals
- Dave Collins, former Major League Baseball player and coach
- Levi L. Conant, born in Littleton, Massachusetts; former professor at the South Dakota School of Mines
- Crazy Horse, leader of the Oglala Sioux tribe
- Blase Joseph Cupich, born in Omaha, Nebraska; fifth Catholic bishop of Rapid City
- Ella Cara Deloria, born in North Dakota; anthropologist
- Harold Joseph Dimmerling, born in Braddock, Pennsylvania; third Catholic bishop of Rapid City
- Sean Doolittle, born in Rapid City, Major League Baseball pitcher and pitching coach
- Helen Duhamel, resident of Rapid City, businesswoman
- John Dutton, football player
- David Dyson, born in Rapid City; bassist and record producer
- Mark Ellis, Major League Baseball player; attended Stevens High School
- Richard E. Ellsworth, United States Air Force, born in Erie, Pennsylvania; commander stationed near Rapid City for whom Ellsworth Air Force Base is named
- Layne Flack, born in Rapid City; professional poker player
- Keith Foulke, born in Rapid City; former Major League Baseball pitcher
- Harry Gandy, born in Churubusco, Indiana; former member of the United States House of Representatives from South Dakota
- Paul Goble, born in Heslemere, England; author and illustrator of children's books, resides in Rapid City
- Dick Green, born in Sioux City, Iowa; resides in Rapid City; second baseman for the Kansas City and Oakland Athletics for 11 years in the 60s and 70s
- Becky Hammon, former resident of Rapid City; former player for the Women's National Basketball Association's New York Liberty and current head coach of the Las Vegas Aces; played for Russian women's Olympic basketball team in 2008
- Carroll Hardy, from Sturgis, South Dakota; former major league baseball player
- Carole Hillard, resident of Rapid City; lieutenant governor of South Dakota
- Jeremy Hinzman, born in Rapid City; Iraq War soldier turned war resister, seeking refugee status in Canada
- Michael Owen Jackels, Roman Catholic bishop
- Patricia Kenner, born in Triumph, Minnesota; member of the South Dakota House of Representatives and Rapid City Board of Education
- John K. Konenkamp, born in Brooklyn, New York; member of the South Dakota Supreme Court; former deputy state's attorney in Rapid City
- Tomi Lahren, born in Rapid City; conservative political commentator
- Randy Lewis, two-time NCAA wrestling champion; 1984 Olympic gold medalist
- Kerry Ligtenberg, born in Rapid City; major league baseball pitcher
- William Tibertus McCarty, born in Crawford County, Pennsylvania; second Catholic bishop of Rapid City
- Alice McCoy, member of the South Dakota State Legislature from Pennington County
- Valentine McGillycuddy, former mayor of Rapid City; dean of the South Dakota School of Mines
- Tatanka Means, born February 19, 1985 in Rapid City, actor and comedian, of Oglala Lakota, Omaha, Yankton Dakota, and Diné descent
- Walter Dale Miller, born in Viewfield, South Dakota; former governor of South Dakota; retired near New Underwood
- Benjamin Munson, physician who performed abortions in Rapid City, both before and after legalization
- Chester Allan Poage, lived with his mother and his sister in Rapid City before moving back to Norton, Kansas and onward to Spearfish, South Dakota before his March 2000 murder
- Shams-ul-Huda Shams, born in Afghanistan; South Dakota School of Mines alumnus; former president of the Afghan Social Democratic Party
- Anthony Allen Shore, born in Rapid City; Serial killer known as the “Tourniquet Killer”; executed in Texas in 2018 for four murders
- Thomas Patten Stafford, born in Weatherford, Oklahoma; astronaut; United States Air Force general, formerly assigned to Ellsworth Air Force Base
- John Stariha, born in Austria; first Roman Catholic bishop of Rapid City
- Jim Sykes, born in Rapid City; radio journalist, producer, and Alaskan politician
- Karen Thurman, born in Rapid City; Democratic political activist; former U.S. representative (Florida)
- Alice Ivers Tubbs, frontier gambler known as "Poker Alice" who died in Rapid City in 1930
- Shane Van Boening, world champion pool player, 9-ball world champion 2022
- Adam Vinatieri, born in Yankton, South Dakota; placekicker for the Indianapolis Colts and the New England Patriots
- Ben Vinson III, president of the American Historical Association and former president of Howard University
- Korczak Ziolkowski, from Keystone; sculptor of Crazy Horse Memorial in Pennington County
