= List of people from South Dakota =

State flag of South Dakota

Location of South Dakota in the United States

This is a list of prominent people who were born in or lived for a significant period in U.S. state of South Dakota. For a larger list by location, see People from South Dakota.

== Academia ==
- Vine Deloria Jr., American Indian author, theologian, historian, and activist
- Alvin Hansen, economist, Harvard professor; born in Viborg
- Arthur Larson, law professor, U.S. undersecretary of labor; born in Sioux Falls
- Ernest O. Lawrence, inventor of cyclotron, winner of 1939 Nobel Prize for Physics; born in Canton
- Lawrence Lessig, internet activist, Harvard Law School professor; born in Rapid City
- Theodore Schultz, economist, winner of 1979 Nobel Prize for Economics; born in Arlington

== Actors and filmmakers ==
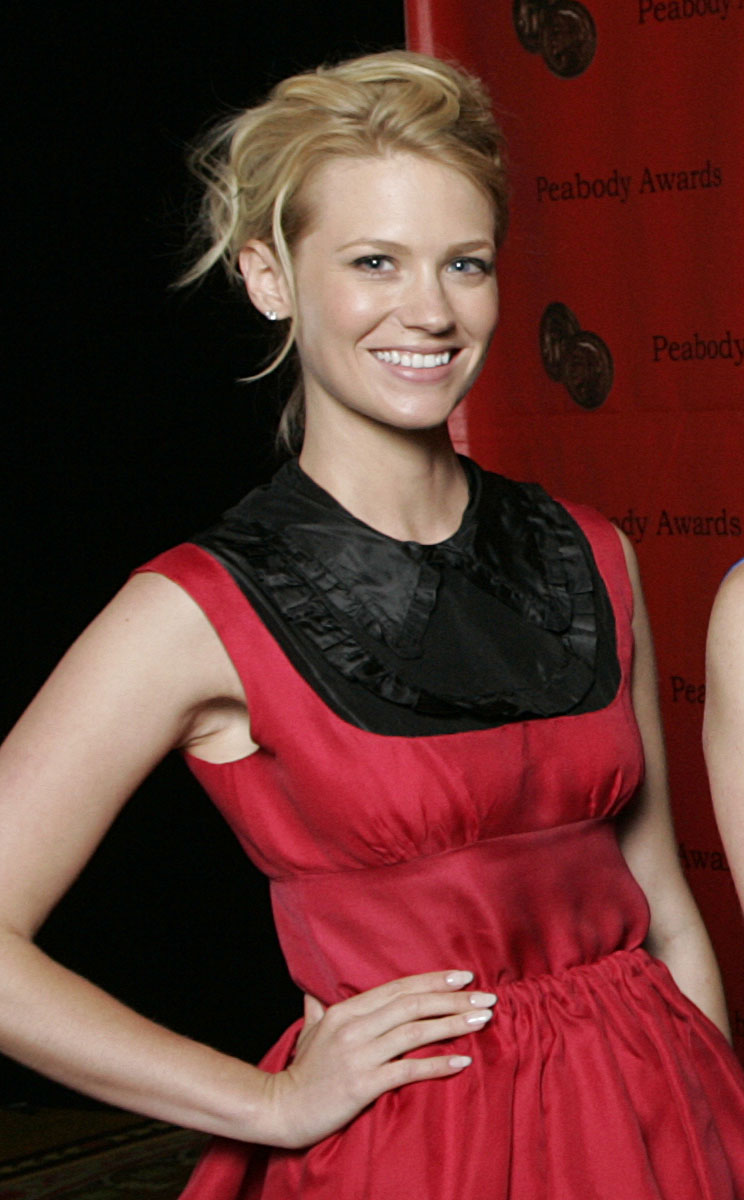
January Jones

- Angela Aames (1956–1988), actress; born in Pierre
- Catherine Bach (born 1954), actress; grew up in South Dakota
- Bruce Baillie (1931–2020), experimental filmmaker; born in Aberdeen
- Rachael Bella (born 1984), actress; born in Vermillion
- Shannon Bolin (1917–2016), actress, singer; born in Spencer
- Moses Brings Plenty (born 1969), actor; born on the Pine Ridge Indian Reservation
- Christopher Cain (born 1943), actor, director, screenwriter; born in Sioux Falls
- Leslie Carlson (1933–2014), actor; born in Mitchell
- Sean Covel(born 1976), film producer; grew up in Edgemont
- Harvey B. Dunn (1894–1968), actor; born in Yankton
- Judith Evelyn (1913–1967), actress; born in Seneca
- Amy Hill (born 1953), actress; born in Deadwood
- Candace Hilligoss (born 1935), actress; born in Huron
- Ron Holgate (born 1937), actor; opera singer; born in Aberdeen
- January Jones (born 1978), actress; born in Hecla
- Cheryl Ladd (born 1951), actress; born in Huron
- Eddie Little Sky (1926–1997), actor; born on the Pine Ridge Indian Reservation
- Cliff Lyons (1901–1974), stuntman, actor; born in Lake County
- Beth Maitland (born 1958), actress; born in Rapid City
- Gail Matthius (born 1953), actress, voice actress; born in New York City
- Russell Means (1939–2012), actor, left-wing activist; born in Wanblee
- John Miljan (1892–1960), actor; born in Lead City
- Debra Mooney (born 1947), actress; born in Aberdeen
- Conrad A. Nervig (1889–1980), Oscar-winning film editor; born in Grant County
- Gary Owens (1934–2015), voice actor, disc jockey; born in Mitchell
- Dorothy Provine (1937–2010), actress, singer, dancer, comedian; born in Deadwood
- Gene Roth (1903–1976), actor; born in Redfield
- Chic Sale (1885–1936), actor, vaudevillian; born in Huron
- Eddie Spears (born 1982), actor; born in Lower Brulé Tribe, South Dakota
- Michael Spears (born 1977), actor; born in Lower Brulé Tribe, South Dakota
- Michael Steinberg (born 1959), director, writer; born in Rapid City
- Joan Tabor (1932–1968), actress; born in Sioux Falls
- Delores Taylor (1939–2018), actress, writer, director; born in Winner
- Casey Tibbs (1929–1990), cowboy, rodeo performer, actor; born in Fort Pierre
- Mamie Van Doren (born 1931), actress; born in Rowena
- Jerry verDorn (1949–2022), actor; born in Sioux Falls
- John War Eagle (1901–1991), actor; born on the Yankton Indian Reservation
- Alfred L. Werker (1896–1975), director; born in Deadwood
- Floyd Red Crow Westerman (1936–2007), actor, left-wing activist; born on the Lake Traverse Indian Reservation
- Timmy Williams (born 1981), actor, comedian; born in Watertown

== Artists ==
- Peggy Detmers, sculptor of wildlife in metal, attended South Dakota State
- Harvey Dunn, painter, born in Manchester
- James Earle Fraser, sculptor; spent much of his life in Mitchell
- Paul Goble, author and illustrator of children's books; lives in Rapid City
- Mary GrandPré, illustrator, born in South Dakota
- Bill Groethe, photographer, born in Rapid City
- Oscar Howe (1915–1983), Native American artist; born in South Dakota
- Terry Redlin (1937–2016), wildlife artist; born in Watertown
- Dick Termes, painter of Termespheres; lives in Spearfish

== Authors and poets ==
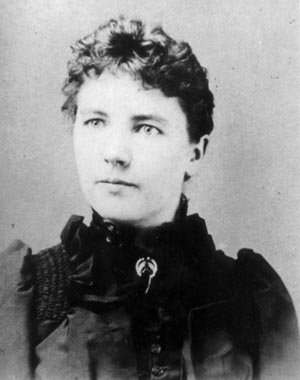
Laura Ingalls Wilder

- Jacob M. Appel, author, wrote Coulrophobia & Fata Morgana while living in Sioux Falls
- L. Frank Baum (1856–1919) author; lived in Aberdeen
- Joseph Bottum (born 1959), essayist and poet; born in Vermillion
- Charles Badger Clark (1883–1957), poet laureate of South Dakota
- Allison Hedge Coke (born 1958), American Book Award-winning poet, writer; South Dakota resident
- Elizabeth Cook-Lynn (born 1930), author; born in Fort Thompson
- Pete Dexter (born 1943), author, screenwriter and journalist, attended University of South Dakota
- David Allan Evans (born 1940), poet laureate of South Dakota
- Joseph Hansen (1923–2004), author, best known for mystery novels; born in Aberdeen
- Cameron Hawley (1905–1969), author, Executive Suite, Cash McCall; born in Howard
- Patrick Hicks (born 1970), novelist and poet, Writer-in-Residence at Augustana University
- Adam Johnson (born 1967), writer, author of The Orphan Master's Son (2012); born in South Dakota, Lakota heritage
- Bill Johnson (born late 1950s), science-fiction writer; born in South Dakota
- Herbert Arthur Krause (1905–1976), historian, professor at Augustana
- Rose Wilder Lane (1886–1968), journalist, travel writer, novelist; born in De Smet
- Gaylord Larsen (born 1932), mystery writer; born in Canova
- Joseph Marshall III, Pen Award-winning author; co-founder of Sinte Gleska College; born on the Rosebud Indian Reservation
- Emily St. James (born 1982), writer, author of Woodworking (2025); born in Armour
- Laura Ingalls Wilder (1867–1957), author, best known for Little House on the Prairie; lived in De Smet

== Business ==
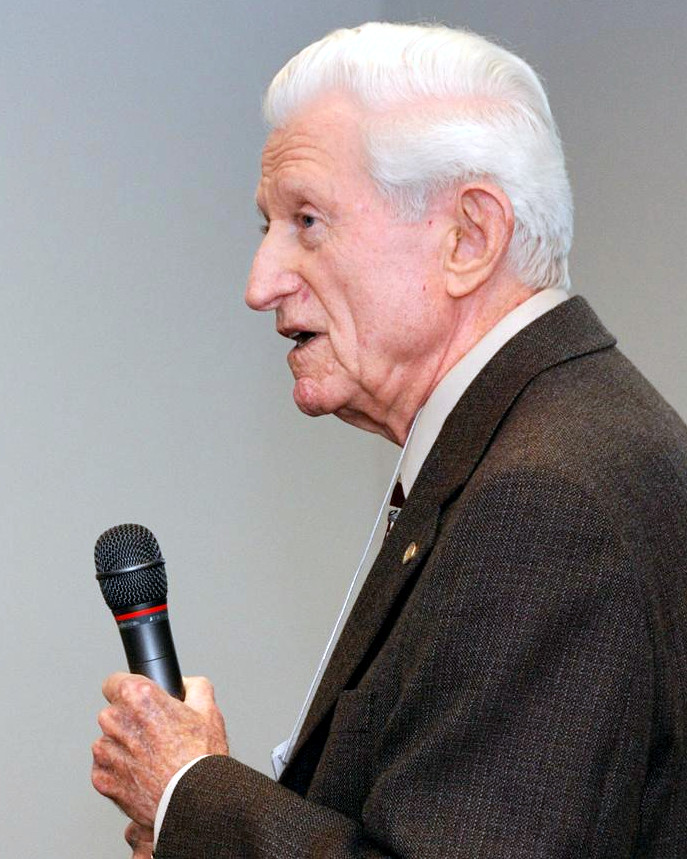
Gene Amdahl

- Gene Amdahl (1922–2015), chief architect of IBM mainframe computer; born in Flandreau
- Al Neuharth (1924–2013), founder of USA Today, born in Eureka
- Lee Raymond (born 1938), CEO and chairman of ExxonMobil Corporation; born in Watertown
- Joseph Robbie, owned NFL's Miami Dolphins; born in Sisseton
- Tom Patterson, founder of Tommy John, born in Milbank

== Military ==
- Oscar Randolph Fladmark (1922–1955), WWII and Korean War pilot; Distinguished Flying Cross recipient; lived in Sioux Falls, born in Moe
- David C. Jones (1921–2013), retired U.S. Air Force general, former chairman of Joint Chiefs of Staff; born in Aberdeen
- Touch the Clouds (c. 1837–1905), Native American chief; later Indian scout and sergeant in the US army

== Music ==
- Joey Clement, band member of Selena Gomez & the Scene; born in Rapid City
- Shawn Colvin (born 1956), Grammy Award-winning musician; born in Vermillion
- Mark Craney (1952–2005), drummer for Jethro Tull, Jean Luc-Ponty, Eric Burdon
- Myron Floren (1919–2005), accordionist, The Lawrence Welk Show; born in Roslyn
- Gary Mule Deer (born 1940), comedian and country musician; born in Deadwood, lives in Spearfish
- Keith Olsen (1945–2020), record producer and sound engineer; born in Sioux Falls
- Jess Thomas (1927–1993), opera singer; born in Hot Springs
- Frank Waln, Sicangu Lakota rapper
- Abby Whiteside (1881–1956), piano teacher, attended University of South Dakota

== Native Americans ==
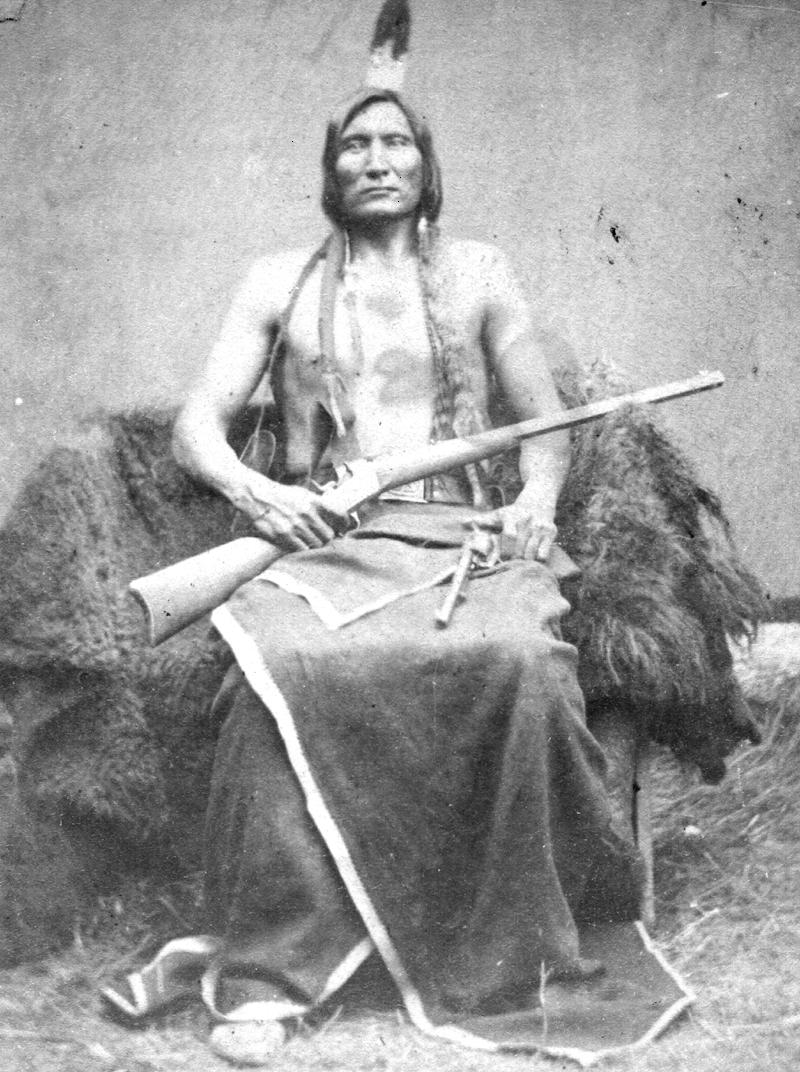
Touch the Clouds

- Gertrude Bonnin (Zitkala-Sa) (1876–1938), Lakota writer and activist; born on Yankton Sioux Reservation
- Crazy Horse (c. 1840–1877), Oglala Lakota war leader
- Russell Means (1939–2012), Native American activist; born in Pine Ridge
- Maria Pearson (1932–2003), Yankton Sioux activist who helped establish the Native American Graves Protection and Repatriation Act
- Rain-in-the-Face (c. 1835–1905), Hunkpapa Lakota chief
- Red Cloud (1822–1909), Oglala Lakota chief
- Sitting Bull (c. 1831–1890), Hunkpapa Lakota chief
- Touch the Clouds (c. 1837–1905), Miniconjou Teton Lakota chief known for his great size
- Floyd "Red Crow" Westerman (1936–2007), musician, activist and actor; born on Sisseton-Wahpeton Dakota Sioux reservation

== Politics and government ==
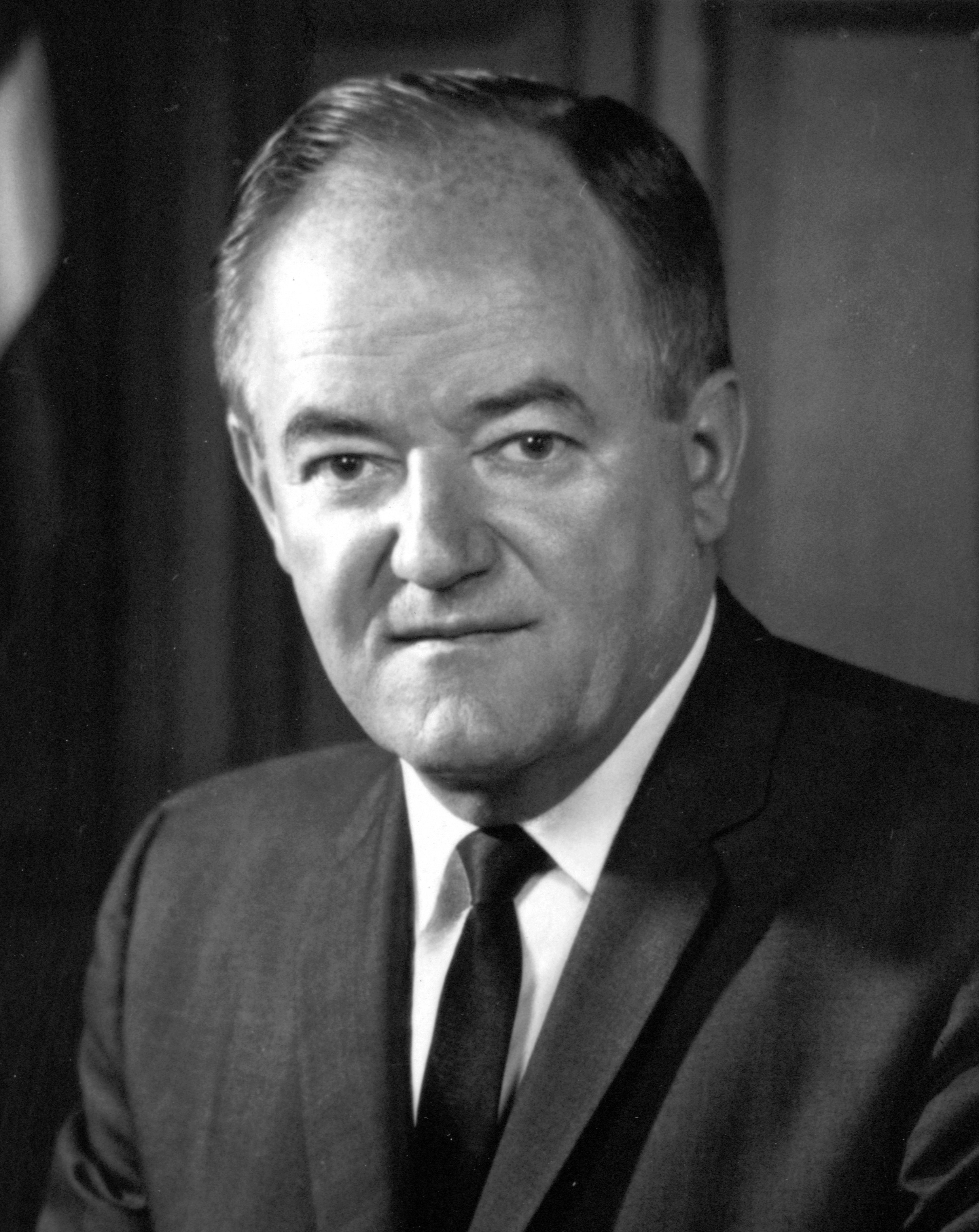
Hubert Humphrey

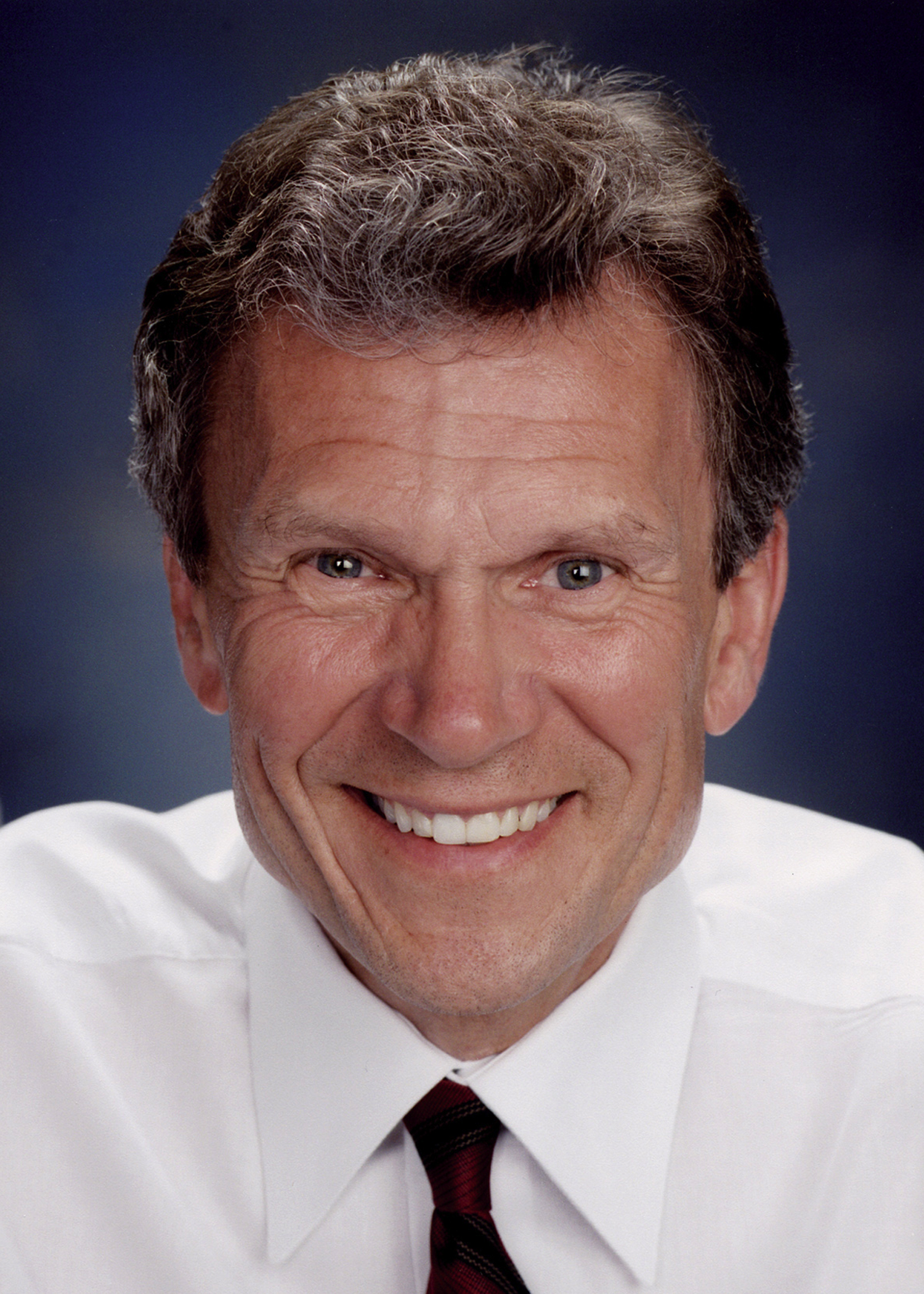
Tom Daschle

- Jim Abdnor (1923–2012), second Lebanese U.S. representative and senator; born in Kennebec
- James Abourezk (born 1931), first Lebanese U.S. representative and senator; born in Wood
- Clinton Presba Anderson, U.S. secretary of agriculture; born in Centerville
- Tom Daschle (born 1947), U.S. majority leader of United States Senate; born in Aberdeen
- J. James Exon (1921–2005), U.S. senator for Nebraska, governor of Nebraska; born in Geddes
- Joe Foss (1915–2003), Medal of Honor recipient, 20th governor of South Dakota, first commissioner of the American Football League; born in Sioux Falls
- Ralph A. Gamble (1885–1959), U.S. representative for New York; born in Yankton
- John Hamre (born 1950), U.S. deputy secretary of defense; born in Watertown
- Hubert Humphrey (1911–1978), U.S. senator, 38th vice president of the U.S., 1968 Democratic presidential candidate; born in Wallace
- Muriel Humphrey Brown, U.S. senator from Minnesota, Second Lady of the United States; born in Huron
- Bill Janklow (1939–2012), governor 1979–1987 and 1995–2003; moved as teen to Flandreau
- Brendan Johnson (born 1975), 40th U.S. attorney for the District of South Dakota; born in Vermillion
- Tim Johnson (born 1946), U.S. senator from South Dakota 1997–2015; born in Canton
- Arthur Larson (1910–1993), U.S. under secretary of labor, lawyer, law professor; born in Sioux Falls
- George McGovern (1922–2012), U.S. senator from South Dakota, 1972 Democratic presidential candidate; born in Avon
- Karl E. Mundt (1900–1974), U.S. senator and U.S. representative; born in Humboldt
- Kristi Noem (born 1971), first female governor of South Dakota and U.S. representative from South Dakota; born in Watertown
- Larry Pressler (born 1942), three-term U.S. senator from South Dakota; born in Humboldt
- Gladys Pyle (1890–1989), first female U.S. senator from South Dakota; born in Huron
- Mike Rounds (born 1954), current U.S. senator from South Dakota, former governor; born in Huron
- Stephanie Herseth Sandlin (born 1970), U.S. representative from South Dakota; born in Houghton
- Edward John Thye (1896–1969), U.S. senator from Minnesota and 26th governor of Minnesota; born in Frederick

== Science ==
- Bob Burris (1914–2010), biochemist; elected to the NAS; contributed to our understanding of biological nitrogen fixation; born in Brookings
- Ernest O. Lawrence (1901–1958), physicist, Nobel Prize winner, built first cyclotron; born in Canton
- John Mortvedt (1932–2012), agronomist and soil scientist who was the world's leading expert on micronutrients; born and raised on a farm near Dell Rapids

== Sports ==
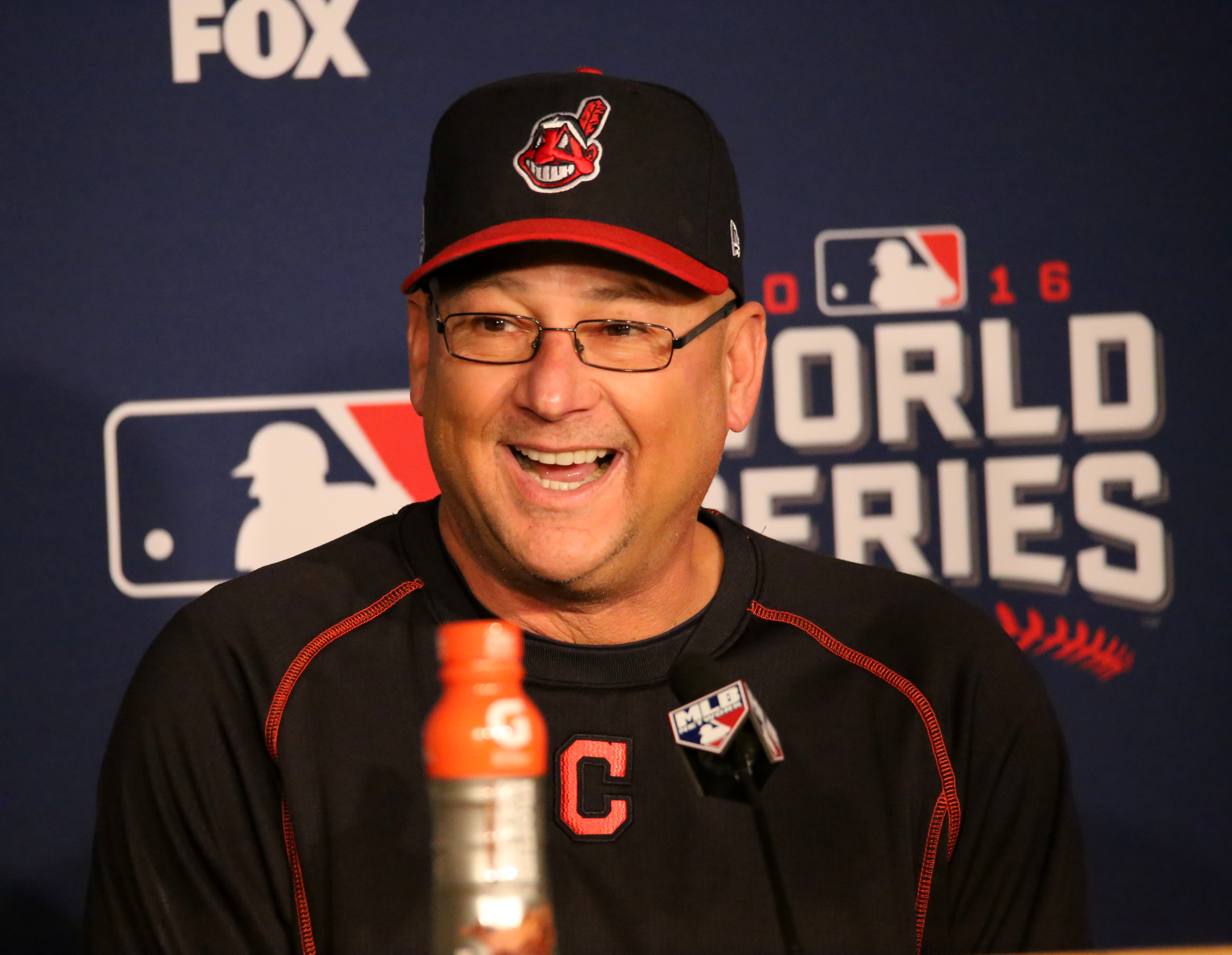
Terry Francona

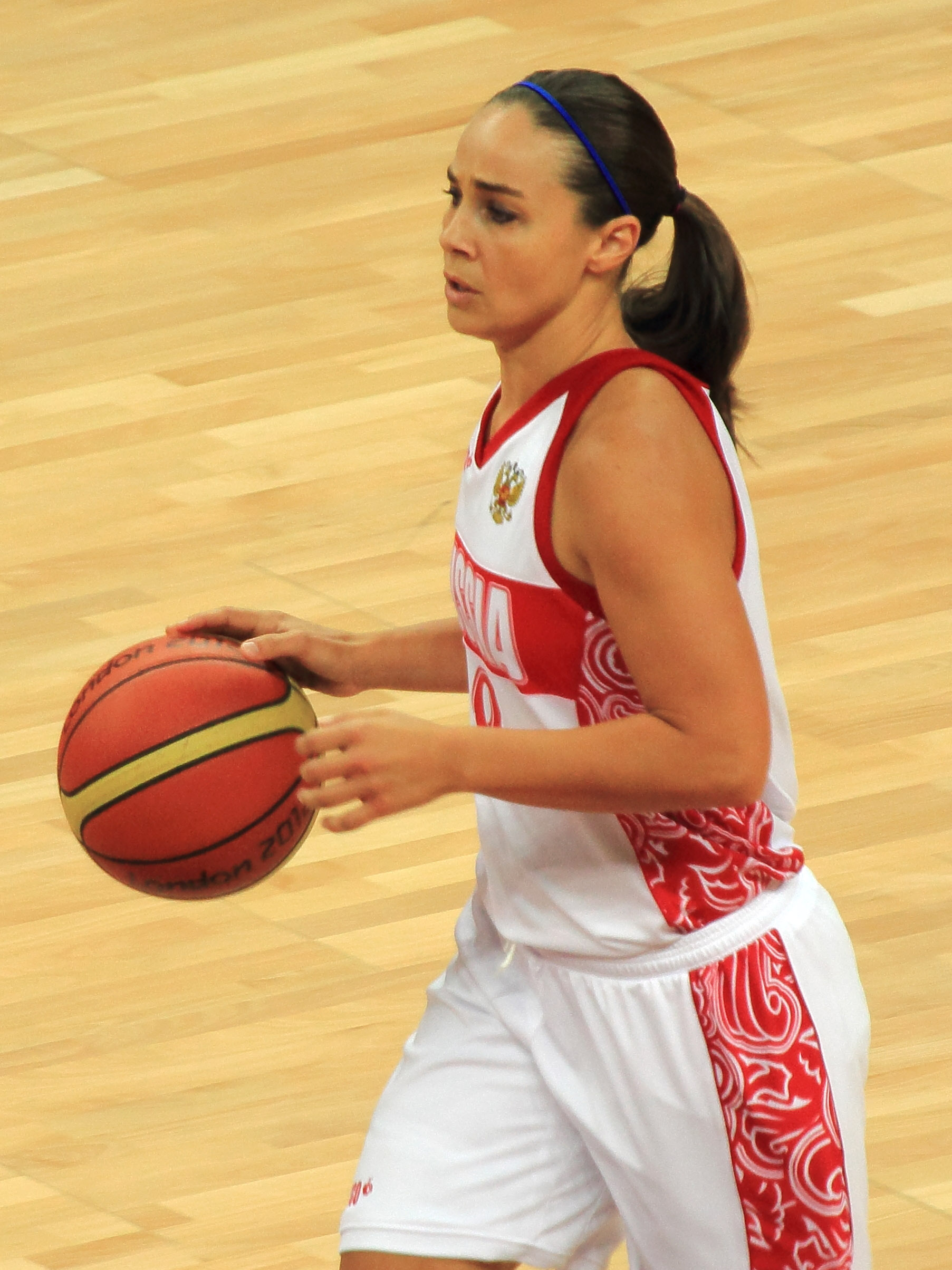
Becky Hammon

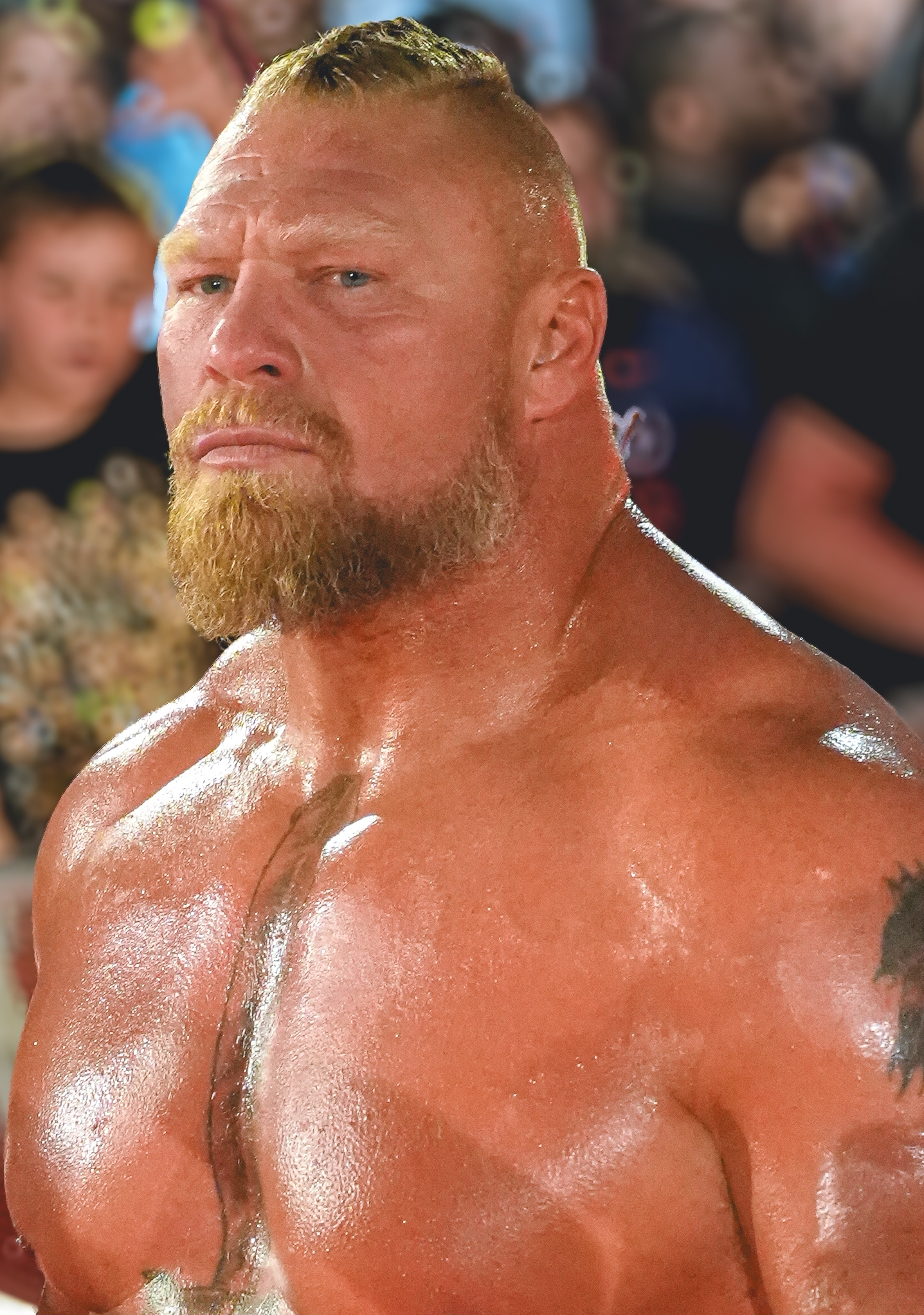
Brock Lesnar

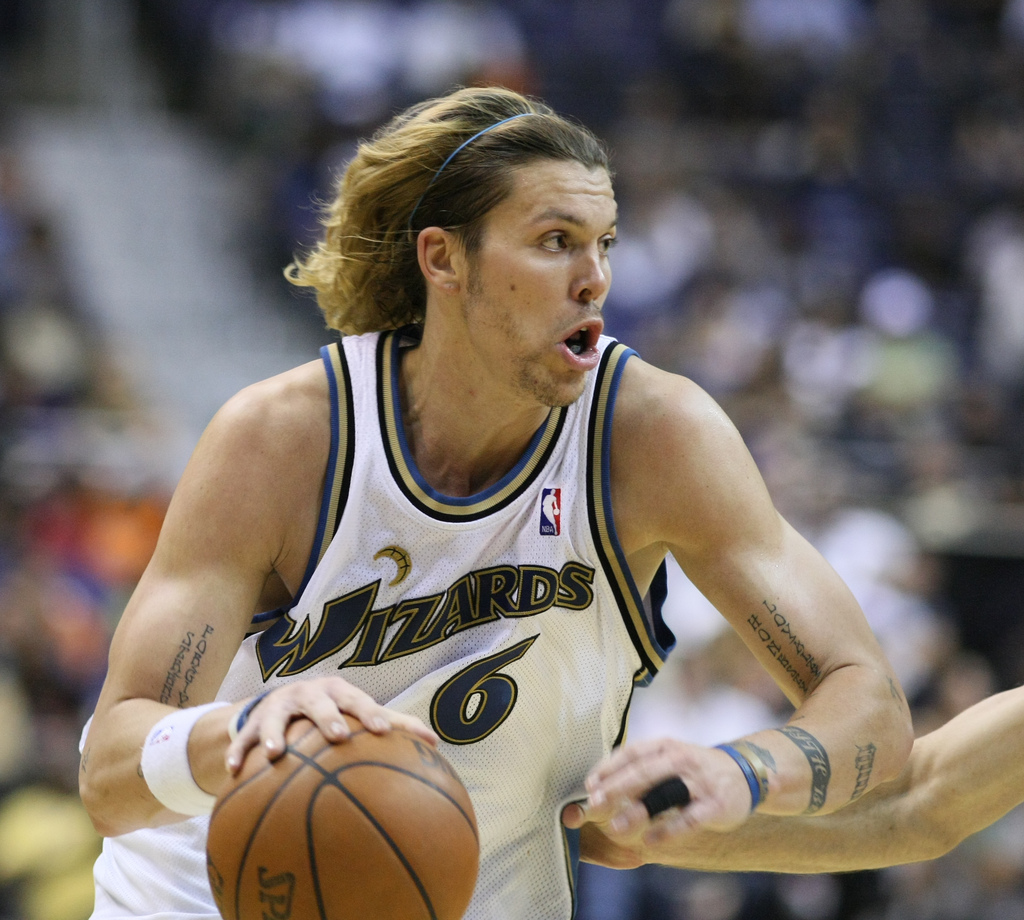
Mike Miller

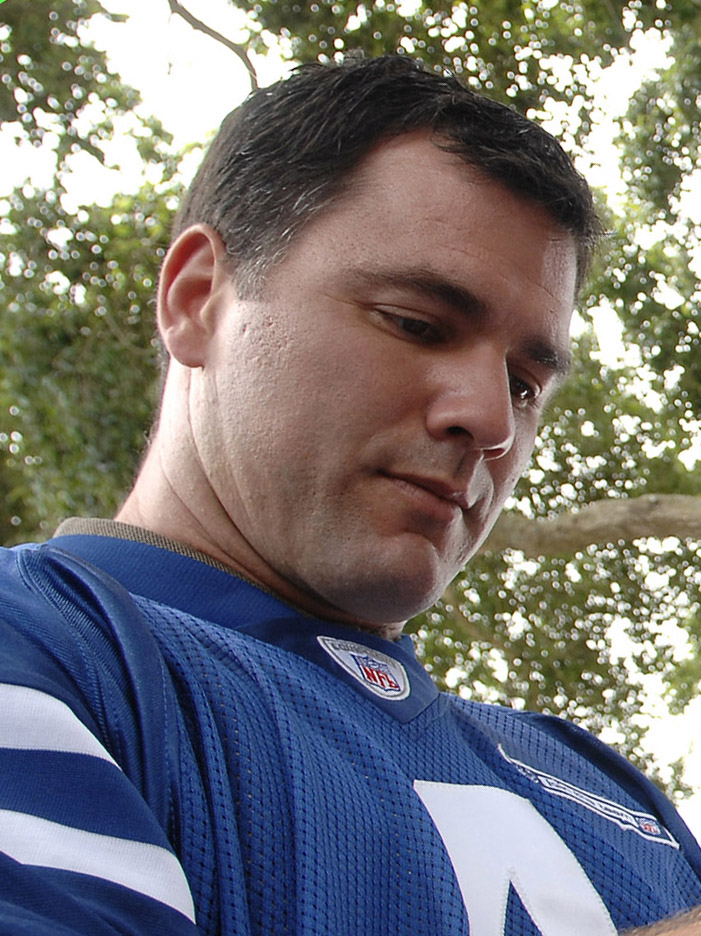
Adam Vinatieri

- Sparky Anderson (1934–2010), Baseball Hall of Fame manager of Cincinnati Reds and Detroit Tigers; born in Bridgewater
- Michael Andrew (born 1999), Olympic swimmer; raised in Aberdeen
- Shayna Baszler (born 1980), mixed martial artist; born in Sioux Falls
- James Bausch (1906–1974), athlete, decathlon gold medalist at 1932 Summer Olympics; born in Marion
- Curt Byrum (born 1958), professional golfer, PGA Tour; Onida
- Tom Byrum (born 1960), professional golfer, PGA Tour, PGA Tour Champions; Onida
- Dallas Clark (born 1979), tight end for the Tampa Bay Buccaneers; born in Sioux Falls
- Dave Collins, baseball player; born in Rapid City
- Jessi Combs (1980–2019), professional racer, female land-speed world record holder, and TV personality; born in Rockerville
- Sean Doolittle (born 1986), baseball player; born in Rapid City
- Justin Duchscherer (born 1977), baseball player; born in Aberdeen
- Mark Ellis (born 1977), baseball player; Rapid City
- Keith Foulke (born 1972), baseball player, relief pitcher for 2004 World Series champion Boston Red Sox; born on Air Force base in South Dakota
- Terry Francona (born 1959), baseball player, manager of the Boston Red Sox and Cleveland Indians; born in Aberdeen
- Chad Greenway (born 1983), linebacker for the Minnesota Vikings; born in Mount Vernon
- Marlene Hagge (1934–2023), golfer, member of World Golf Hall of Fame; born in Eureka
- Becky Hammon (born 1977), basketball player and coach; born in Rapid City
- Clare Jacobs (1886–1971), athlete, pole vault bronze medalist in 1908 Olympics; born in Madison
- Dennis Koslowski (born 1959), Greco-Roman wrestler, two-time Olympic medalist; born in Watertown
- Duane Koslowski (born 1959), Greco-Roman wrestler, former Olympian; born in Watertown
- Jason Kubel (born 1982), outfielder for the Arizona Diamondbacks; born in Belle Fourche
- Ward Lambert (1888–1958), college basketball coach; born in Deadwood
- Ben Leber, football player; attended high school in Vermillion
- Brock Lesnar (born 1977), UFC fighter and WWE professional wrestler; born in Webster
- Randy Lewis (born 1959), freestyle wrestler, 1984 Los Angeles Olympics gold medalist; born in Rapid City
- Clarence "Pug" Manders (1913–1985), pro football running back; born in Milbank
- Jack Manders (1909–1977), pro football running back; born in Milbank
- Mike Martz (born 1951), former NFL head coach and offensive coordinator; born in Sioux Falls
- Lincoln McIlravy (born 1974), freestyle wrestler, 2000 Sydney Olympics bronze medalist; born in Rapid City
- David Michaud (born 1988), UFC fighter; born in Pine Ridge
- Derek Miles (born 1972), Olympic pole vaulter; from Tea
- Tim Miles (born 1966), Big Ten basketball coach; born in Huron
- Mike Miller (born 1980), pro basketball player; born in Mitchell
- Billy Mills (born 1938), athlete, gold medalist in 1964 Olympics; born in Pine Ridge
- Dale Moss (born 1988), football player and model; born in Brandon
- Gene Okerlund (1942–2019), professional wrestling commentator; born in Brookings
- Eric Piatkowski (born 1970), pro basketball player; attended high school in Rapid City
- Riley Reiff, football player for Minnesota Vikings; from Parkston
- Jared Reiner, basketball player; from Tripp
- Darwin Robinson, NFL running back; from Redfield
- Bill Scherr (born 1961), freestyle wrestler, World Champion, four-time World medalist and Olympic bronze medalist; born in Eureka
- Wilbur Thompson (1921–2013), athlete, 1948 Summer Olympics gold medalist in shot put; born in Frankfort
- Derrek Tuszka (born 1997), pro football linebacker for the Denver Broncos; born in Warner
- Shane Van Boening (born 1983), professional pool player; born in Rapid City
- Norm Van Brocklin (1926–1983), football player; born in Eagle Butte
- Adam Vinatieri (born 1972), NFL placekicker; born in Yankton
- Brandon Wegher (born 1990), football player; born in Dakota Dunes
- Grey Zabel (born 2002), NFL offensive lineman for the Seattle Seahawks; born in Pierre

== Television ==
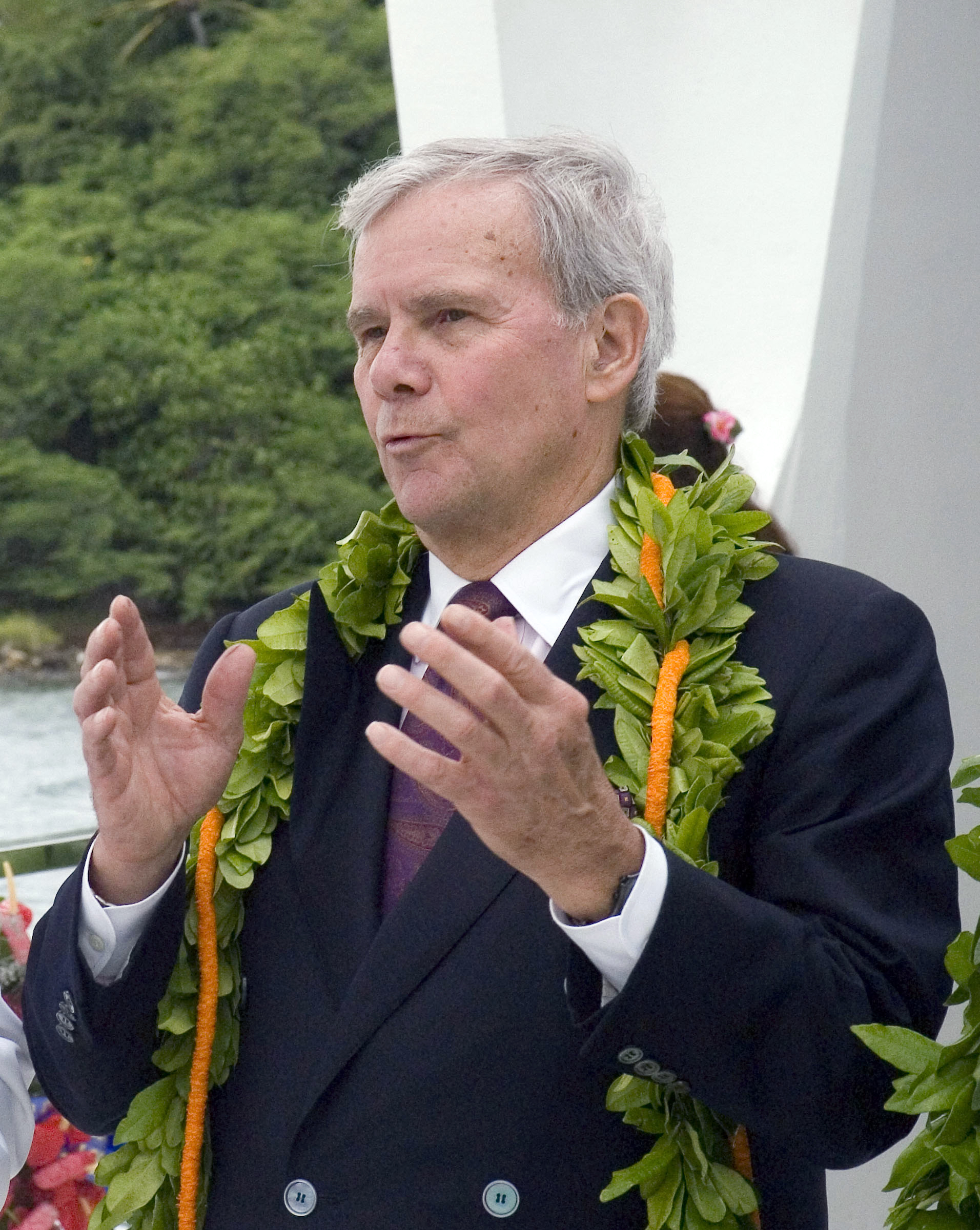
Tom Brokaw

- Bob Barker (1923–2023), television game show host; raised on the Rosebud Indian Reservation
- Tom Brokaw (born 1940), television journalist, former NBC Nightly News anchor; born in Webster
- Don Fedderson (1913–1994), television producer and creator, My Three Sons, Family Affair, The Millionaire; born in Beresford
- Mary Hart (born 1950), television personality (Entertainment Tonight); from Madison, and Sioux Falls
- Chelsea Houska (born 1991), television personality (Teen Mom 2)
- Tomi Lahren (born 1992), conservative political commentator, host of TheBlaze's Tomi; raised in Rapid City
- Pat O'Brien (born 1948), sports commentator, television personality (Access Hollywood); born in Sioux Falls
- Gary Owens (1934–2015), announcer for Rowan & Martin's Laugh-In, radio disc jockey, voice actor; born in Mitchell

== Uncategorized ==
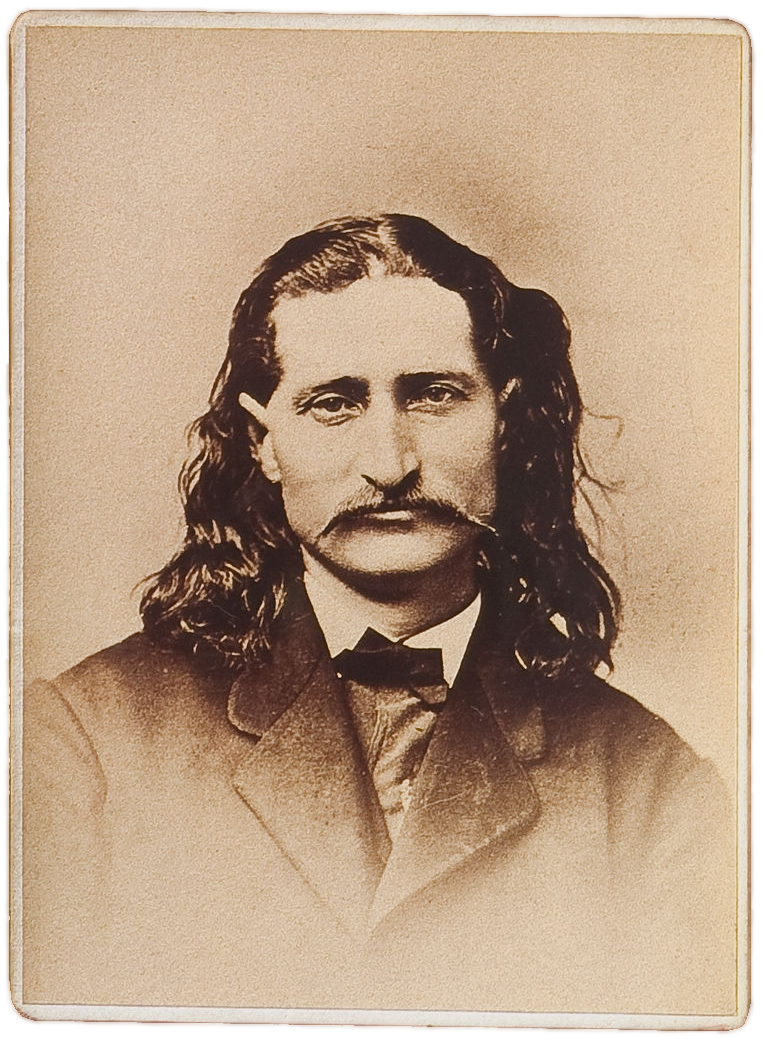
Wild Bill Hickok

- Helen Morton Barker, social reformer
- Gutzon Borglum, sculptor of Mount Rushmore
- Seth Bullock, first sheriff of Deadwood
- Billy Etbauer, rodeo cowboy; born in Huron
- Alvin Hansen, economist; born in Viborg
- Wild Bill Hickok, Wild West lawman; lived in Deadwood
- Calamity Jane, Wild West figure; lived in Deadwood
- Frank Leahy, Notre Dame football coach; attended school in Winner
- Lawrence Lessig, political activist; from Rapid City
- Boyd McDonald, pornographer
- Vernon C. Miller, outlaw and Huron lawman
- Peter Norbeck, South Dakota governor and senator
- Mary E. Norton (1833–1916), Congregational minister and home missionary worker
- William H. Parker, longtime Los Angeles police chief; born in Lead
- James "Scotty" Philip, rancher
- James Edward Zimmerman, inventor; born in Lantry
- Korczak Ziółkowski, sculptor of Crazy Horse Memorial

== See also ==
- List of people from Rapid City, South Dakota
- List of South Dakota suffragists
- List of University of South Dakota people
