= Dan Davis (writer) =

American author and former fugitive

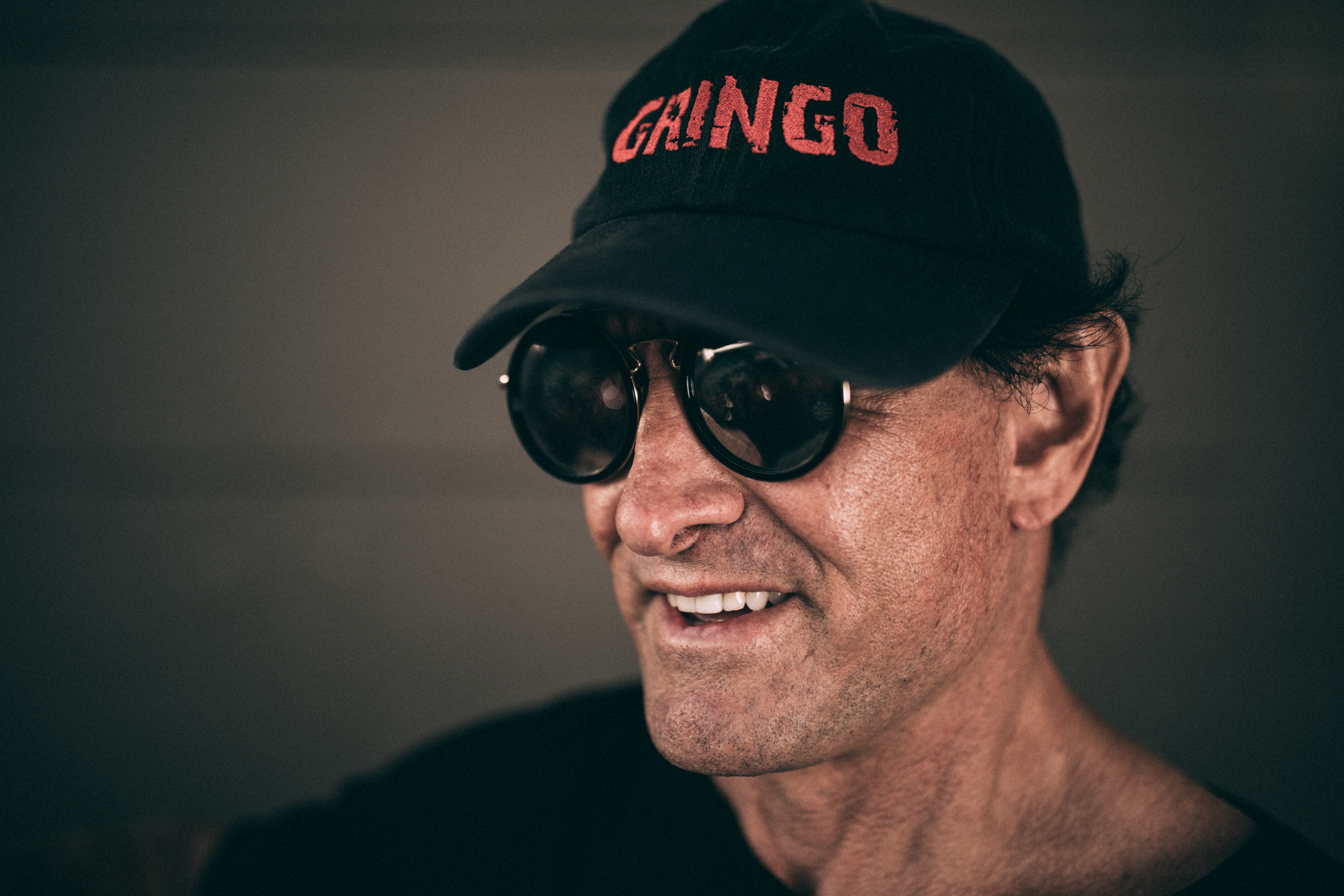
- Davis in 2018
- Born: Daniel E. Davis; July 10, 1953 (age 73); Pierre, South Dakota, US
- Education: Black Hills State University, University of Nevada, Las Vegas
- Occupation: Author
- Writing career
- Pen name: Dan "Tito" Davis
- Genre: Autobiography
- Website: Official website

Dan "Tito" Davis (born 1953) is an American writer. Davis was a fugitive from US authorities between 1994 and 2007, when he was renditioned back to the US from Venezuela. He is the author of the book Gringo: My Life on the Edge as an International Fugitive.

== Education and early life ==
Dan Davis was born in South Dakota. He was on the wrestling team in high school and became a professional horse jockey afterwards. Davis began selling legal ephedrine pills (white crosses) in 1972, starting with Black Hills State College, before transferring to University of Nevada, Las Vegas where he supplied legal ephedrine pills to the Bandidos Motorcycle Club. He spent five years in prison during the 1980s for tax fraud.

== Fugitive years ==
In 1998 Davis was indicted on state and federal charges, including conspiracy to distribute methamphetamines and marijuana, with additional narcotics charges from 1994—which Davis claims were the result of a friend of his framing him with 2 pounds (0.91 kg) of meth. After living in hiding in the US he then fled to Mexico in 1994, where he eluded discovery by US and Mexican officials. He was discovered again in 2006 living and working in the Margarita Islands of Venezuela. He was arrested and deported by Venezuelan authorities under unusual circumstances in 2007, and arrested for the pending American drug charges by US officials upon his return to American soil. Davis and his Venezuelan lawyers have stated that they believe the deportation was actually an example of kidnapping and illegal rendition. It is alleged that the US government paid up to $2 million for Davis's rendition. During his time on the run, he lived in more than fifty countries, spending much of his time in Colombia under the protection of the Medellin Cartel. In 2008 he was sentenced to ten years in prison.

== Writing career ==
In 2017 with author Peter Conti, Davis co-authored a book on his fugitive years entitled Gringo: My Life on the Edge as an International Fugitive. The book was the number one bestseller on Amazon's Hot New Releases bestseller list. He has toured internationally in support of the book. Davis is also in talks to turn his book into a movie, based in part upon the 500 additional pages he wrote that did not appear in the final manuscript. In 2018, Gringo: My Life on the Edge as an International Fugitive won the Readers' Favorite Gold Medal award in the Non-Fiction Autobiography category On January 4, 2019, Davis sailed to the Antarctic Peninsula on board the Polar Latitudes operated expedition vessel MS Island Sky and completed a seven-continent book tour in Port Lockroy, Antarctica.

== See also ==
- List of fugitives from justice who disappeared
