= Tipi: Home of the Nomadic Buffalo Hunters =

2007 picture book by Paul Goble

- Author: Paul Goble
- Illustrator: Paul Goble
- Genre: Children's book
- Publisher: World Wisdom
- Publication date: 2007
- Publication place: United States
- Pages: 120
- ISBN: 1-933316-39-X
- OCLC: 76828780
- Dewey Decimal: 728.089/97078 22
- LC Class: E98.D9 G63 2007

Tipi: Home of the Nomadic Buffalo Hunters is an illustrated, non-fiction, young adult picture book by Caldecott-winning author and illustrator Paul Goble. It was published by World Wisdom Books in 2007.

== Content ==
Tipi: Home of the Nomadic Buffalo Hunters is a reference book that documents the history and construction, as well as culture and spiritual significance of the tipi to the Plains Indians. The material is covered at both the large and small scale; offering information on the Plain Indians in general as well as individual tribes (including diagrams and illustrations of specific famous tipis).

When asked about the book, Goble explained "This book is the kind of book I began looking for, but never found. So I have made it for you."

== Awards ==
This book has been nominated for several awards, including:

- Child/Young-Adult Non-Fiction (2007), MIPA
- Nature (2007), MIPA
- Juvenile Nonfiction (2007), ForeWord Magazine
- Interior Design, Children's/Young Adult (2008), Publishers Marketing Association
