= Black Hills State University =

Public university in Spearfish, South Dakota, US

- Former names: Dakota Territorial Normal School (1883–1941); Black Hills Teachers College (1941–1964); Black Hills State College (1964–1989)
- Motto: Where Anything is Possible
- Type: Public university
- Established: 1883; 143 years ago
- Academic affiliations: Space-grant
- President: Steve Elliot
- Provost: Pamela Carriveau
- Students: 3,346 (fall 2024)
- Undergraduates: 3,198 (fall 2024)
- Postgraduates: 148 (fall 2024)
- Location: Spearfish, South Dakota, United States; 44°29′49.63″N 103°52′22.18″W
- Campus: Rural
- Colors: Green and Gold
- Nickname: Yellow Jackets
- Sporting affiliations: NCAA Division II – Rocky Mountain
- Mascot: Sting the Yellow Jacket
- Website: www.bhsu.edu

Black Hills State University (BHSU) is a public university in Spearfish, South Dakota, United States. Close to 4,000 students attend classes at its 123-acre (50 ha) campus in Spearfish, with a satellite campus in Rapid City which is shared with South Dakota State University, and through distance offerings. BHSU is governed by the South Dakota Board of Regents.

== History ==
The predecessor to Black Hills State University operated from 1881 to 1883 and was called Dakota College or Dakota Academy. Dakota College was funded by the Congregational Church and was not affiliated with BHSU. In 1883, in support for a new normal school, John Mauer put up a plot of land west of Spearfish Creek for sale for $800. Joseph Ramsdell collected money from donors and bought the land for $790.85. John Wolzmuth, Frank J. Washabaugh, and E.M. Bowman also gathered funds for the school. Established by the Dakota Territorial Legislature, the new school was called Dakota Territorial Normal School, and a temporary building was constructed in late 1883. Van Buren Baker became the first administrator and teacher at the school on April 14, 1884; he left Spearfish in December after leaving the school nearly bankrupt. The school reopened in September 1885 under the leadership of Fayette Cook; 70 students were enrolled at that time. The coursework initially consisted of high school classes and one year beyond high school. The Normal School Main Building was constructed in 1887 and stood until 1925. A laboratory school was opened in 1895 and lasted until 1963.

By 1924, the school was authorized to adopt a four-year curriculum leading to a Bachelor of Science in Education degree. As a result of the outbreak of World War II in Europe, BHSU created a 12-week civil aeronautics course, which had 44 graduates in its first year. Most of the graduates went directly to the military. When the US entered the war in 1941, the course was cut down to eight weeks. Known informally as a teacher's college during the 1920s and 1930s, the name was officially changed to Black Hills Teachers College in 1941. During Russel E. Jonas's presidency from 1942 to 1967, several new additions to the campus were made, including new dorms, an additional library, and a three-story classroom building. On July 1, 1964, in recognition of the broadening educational opportunities offered by the college, the legislature officially changed the name to Black Hills State College. BHSU had its first enrollment of 2,000 students for the 1968–69 academic year; this was partially due to draft evasion by men during the Vietnam War. In October 1969 students protested on campus against the war. The local Veterans Club chartered an airplane to drop leaflets that read "America, love it or leave it" on the protesting students. In 1970, Richard Gibb of the South Dakota higher education commission proposed that BHSU be changed from a four-year college and into a junior college under a larger university system to be established in Rapid City; he also proposed that the secondary teachers' masters program be scrapped. The legislative branch of Spearfish, along with contemporary BHSU president Meredith Freeman, argued that population growth made it necessary for BHSU to remain an independent four-year university, and that financial complications might arise as a result of the change. The Board of Regents ruled that while BHSU would remain a four-year college, the master's program would be withdrawn. As a result, summer enrollment, especially by education majors, dropped significantly.

An additional library that included an art gallery and museum exhibits was opened in 1973. George H. W. Bush visited BHSU during his campaign for President of the United States and drew controversy when, asked if he believed that the Black Hills should be returned to the Lakota people, he replied that he did not. The state legislature changed the college's name to Black Hills State University, effective July 1, 1989. Additions to the campus during the 1990s included housing for married students, the Donald E. Young Sports and Fitness Center, and an expansion on the student union. Additions to campus during the 2000s included campus beautification of the walkway between Meier Hall, Woodburn Hall, and the Young Center; the Flickema Gardens; expansion of the David B. Miller Yellow Jacket Student Union; the Joy (Proctor) Krautschun Alumni/Foundation Welcome Center; Crow Peak Residence Hall, remodel of Jonas Science Building, and a new residence for the university's president. In October 2022, an expansive remodel of the E.Y. Berry Library was completed.

Laurie S. Nichols was named the 11th President of Black Hills State University in December 2019.

== Academics ==
Black Hills State University is organized into three colleges: the College of Liberal Arts, the College of Business and Natural Sciences, and the College of Education and Behavioral Sciences. The university offers a number of degrees to students including over 120 majors and minors, 8 master's degree programs, 7 associate degree programs, and 17 pre-professional programs.

=== College of Liberal Arts ===
The College of Liberal Arts is divided into two Schools: the School of Arts and Humanities and the School of Math and Social Sciences. The mission of the College of Liberal Arts is to prepare undergraduate students for public school teaching, graduate school, law school, or other occupations with degrees in graphic design and communication, music, mass communication, American Indian studies, political science, and history. The college also offers services for students such as the Writing Assistance Center and the Math Assistance Center.

The college supports outreach through its Center for American Indian Studies (CAIS) and Center for Conservation of Biological Resources (CCBR). Finally, the college contributes to the progress of the university, serves the needs of relevant disciplines and professions, and enhances the quality of life in our state and region through service activities.

=== College of Business and Natural Sciences ===
The College of Business and Natural Sciences is organized in two Schools: the School of Business and the School of Natural Sciences. The mission of the College of Business and Natural Sciences at Black Hills State University is to develop business and natural science graduates who can compete effectively in a dynamic global environment through innovative instruction, mentoring, research, and service in degree programs such as Business Administration, Professional Accountancy, Applied Health Sciences, Biology and Chemistry. The Department of Military Science is also housed in the college.

To further support the college and its mission, the South Dakota Center for Enterprise Opportunity (SD CEO); the Center for Economic Education (CEE); the Center for Business, Entrepreneurship, and Tourism (CBET); the South Dakota Small Business Innovation Research Program; WestCore; Black Hills Herbarium; and the Center for the Conservation of Biological Resources (CCBR) provide outreach and service to the local community, state, and region.

=== College of Education and Behavioral Sciences ===
The College of Education and Behavioral Sciences is organized into two Schools: the School of Education and the School of Behavioral Sciences. The mission of the College is to provide a student-centered and supportive environment for students to learn and to prepare for successful careers through a degree in Psychology, Sociology, Human Services, Exercise Science, Outdoor Education, Physical Education, Elementary Education, Special Education, or Middle Level and High School Teaching.

Students in the college have the opportunity to partake in field placements, internships, and mentored research opportunities.

=== Accreditation ===
The university is accredited by the Commission on Institutions of Higher Education of the North Central Association of Colleges and Schools, the Association to Advance Collegiate Schools of Business, the National Council for the Accreditation of Teacher Education, and the National Association of Schools of Music. The university is also a member of the American Association of State Colleges and Universities (AASCU) and the National Commission on Accrediting (ACU).

== Campus ==
Undergraduate demographics as of Fall 2023
Race and ethnicity	Total
White	80%
Unknown	6%
American Indian/Alaska Native	4%
Hispanic	4%
Black	2%
International student	2%
Two or more races	2%
Asian	1%
Economic diversity
Low-income (Note: The percentage of students who received an income-based federal Pell grant intended for low-income students.)	32%
Affluent (Note: The percentage of students who are a part of the American middle class at the bare minimum.)	68%

The Black Hills State University campus consists of 123 acres (50 ha) and 20 main buildings in addition to Ida Henton Park and Lyle Hare Stadium.

Construction was completed in 2009 for the Student Union expansion that has more than doubled the amount of space available for students. An $8-million science building opened in 2011. The 26,000-square-foot (2,400 m^{2}) science building is located west of the current Jonas Science wing. Clare and Josef Meier Hall, a state-of-the-art a music and classroom building, was added in the center of campus in 2003. This 44,919-square-foot (4,173.1 m^{2}) building includes a 280-seat recital hall, choir and band rooms, faculty studios, classrooms, soundproof practice rooms, conference rooms, instrument storage areas, keyboard, listening and piano labs and faculty offices.

A majority of the university's instructional programs and offices are housed in Woodburn Hall, Wenona Cook Hall, Jonas Hall, and the Donald E. Young Sports and Fitness Center. The E.Y. Berry Library-Learning Center, the first South Dakota library to implement electronic catalog system, contains learning resources, both print and electronic.

Six residence halls and an eight-building apartment complex accommodate nearly 1000 students. The David B. Miller Yellow Jacket Student Union serves the social and recreational needs of the students. The Donald E. Young Sports and Fitness Center provides fitness facilities and an aquatics center, as well as classrooms and faculty offices. The Joy (Proctor) Krautschun Alumni Foundation Welcome Center offers space for alumni, students and the community to hold campus and community meetings and events.

In 2017, the University re-graded a steep hill to a gentle slope on the southwest side of campus. This extensive landscaping project created the opportunity for an ADA-accessible walkway connecting campus with the Spearfish community along St. Joe Street. The sidewalk adjoins the city walk/bike path and leads to the campus green that is used for campus and community events. On April 24, 2017, Black Hills State University officially named the newly renovated hillside on campus "Oyate Wicaka Wita," (pronounced Ohyah'tay weecha'ka Weeta) a Lakota name meaning People/Nation Gathering Place.

== Athletics ==
The athletic teams of BHSU are known as the Yellow Jackets. The university is a member of the NCAA and participates in the Rocky Mountain Athletic Conference (RMAC). The men's athletic teams include basketball, cross country, football, and track & field. The women's athletic teams include basketball, cross country, golf, soccer, softball, track & field, triathlon, and volleyball. In addition, BHSU also has recreation sports and rodeo. BHSU rodeo teams are members of the National Intercollegiate Rodeo Association (NIRA).

== Student life ==
=== Campus media ===
BHSU is home to the student-run radio station KBHU-FM, TV station KBHU-TV and student newspaper The Jacket Journal.

== Notable people ==
=== Alumni ===
- Zac Alcorn, former NFL tight end
- Jillian Balow, Wyoming superintendent of public instruction, effective 2015, graduate studies in 2000
- Raymond W. Carpenter, United States Army Major General who served as acting Director of the Army National Guard
- Dan Davis, writer and international fugitive
- Steve Harshman, Class of 1986, 64th Speaker of the Wyoming House of Representatives, Jan, 2017–present
- Ryan Maher, South Dakota politician
- Benjamin Munson, pre-Roe v. Wade abortion provider
- Clint Roberts, The Marlboro Man and U.S. Representative from South Dakota from 1981 to 1983
- Creighton Leland Robertson, Episcopal bishop of South Dakota
- Brian Shaw, leading American strongman, four-time winner of the World's Strongest Man (2011, 2013, 2015, and 2016) competition
- Sean Sherman, chef and author
- Roger Tellinghuisen, 27th Attorney General of South Dakota
- Dick Termes, artist
- Bruce Williams and Terry Ree, members of the comedy duo Williams and Ree
- Sarah Eagle Heart, Emmy Award-winning producer, writer, and activist

=== Presidents ===
1. Fayette L. Cook (1885–1919)
2. Ethelburt Cooke Woodburn (1919–1942)
3. Russel E. Jonas (1942–1967)
4. Meredith N. Freeman (1967–1976)
5. Maurice Fitzgerald (1976–1977)
6. J. Gilbert Hause (1977–1985)
7. Clifford Trump (1985–1994)
8. Thomas Flickema (1994–2006)
9. Kay Schallenkamp (2006–2014)
10. Tom Jackson, Jr. (2014–2019)
11. Laurie Nichols (2019–2023)
12. Steve Elliot (2023-present)
