= Tom Jackson Jr. =

American academic

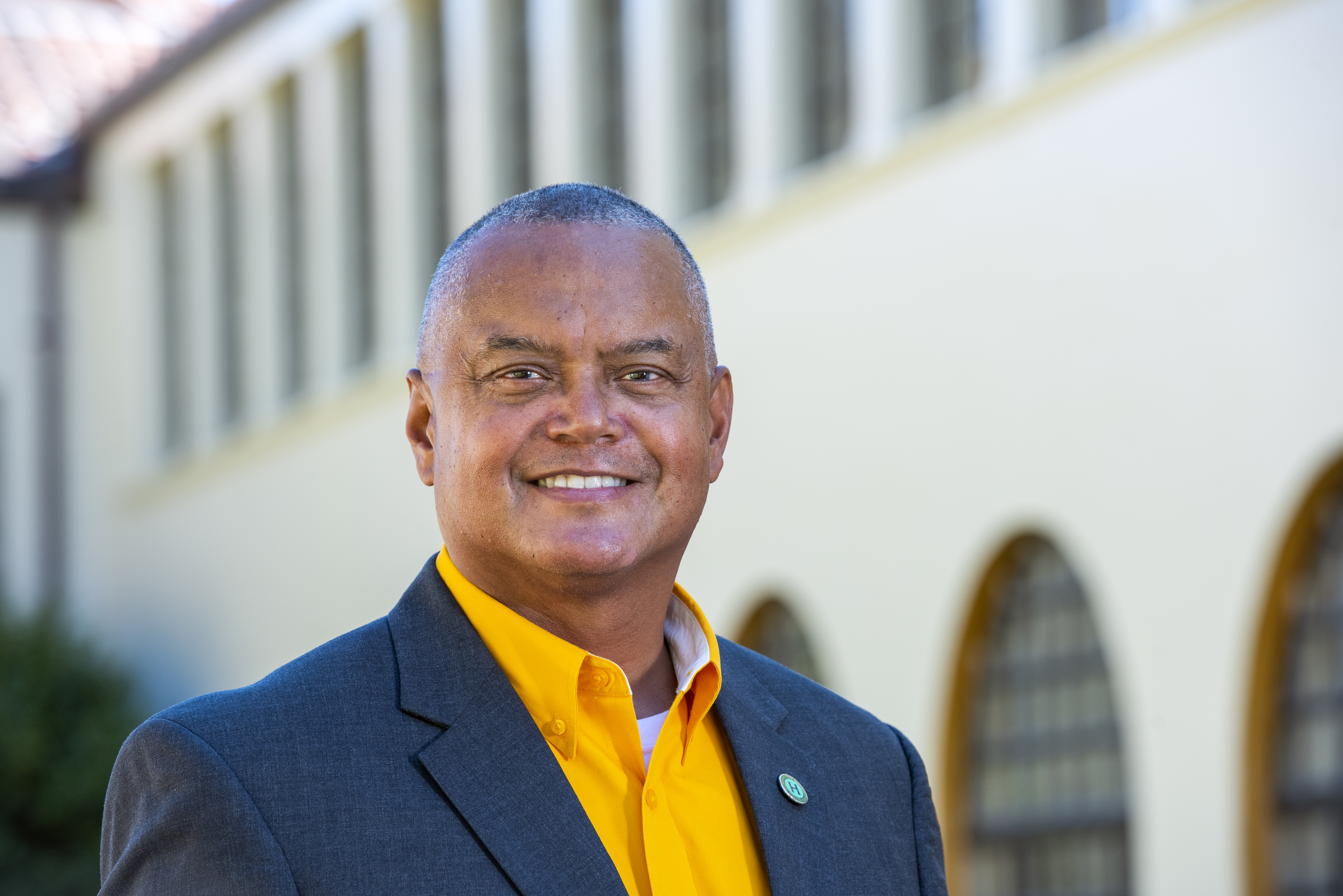

8th President of Cal Poly Humboldt
- In office June 30, 2019 – August 26, 2024
- Preceded by: Lisa Rossbacher
- Succeeded by: Michael E. Spagna

10th President of Black Hills State University
- In office July 3, 2014 – June 29, 2019
- Preceded by: Kay Schallenkamp
- Succeeded by: Laurie Nichols

Personal details
- Born: December 18, 1959 (age 66) Seattle, Washington
- Spouse: Mona Kumar Jackson
- Children: 2
- Education: Highline Community College (AA); Southwest State University (BS); University of La Verne (MS, EdD)
- Website: Office of the President

Tom Jackson Jr. (born December 18, 1959) is an American academic who served as president of California Polytechnic University Humboldt from fall 2019 to August 2024. He is best known for overseeing the university's transition to a polytechnic.

He was previously president of Black Hills State University in Spearfish, South Dakota, vice president for student affairs at the University of Louisville in Louisville, Kentucky, and president of the American College Personnel Association (ACPA).

== Early life and education ==
Jackson was born December 18, 1959, in Seattle, Washington. Jackson received his AA in general studies in 1982 from Highline College, his BS in business management/personnel in 1985 from Southwest State University, his MS in counseling/student personnel (CACREP) in 1987, and his EdD in educational management from the University of La Verne in 1995. Jackson attended Harvard University's Institute for Educational Management (IEM) in 2005.

== Career ==
Jackson's career includes experience at colleges and universities throughout the United States including serving as President of the American College Personnel Association (ACPA).

Top priorities for Jackson in leadership positions have been internationalism, service to veterans, and expanding education opportunities.

Jackson was named the top "Rising Accounts of Higher Education Presidents to Follow on Twitter" by higher education blogger Josie Alhquist. On Thursday April 24, 2024 the General Faculty of Cal Poly Humboldt passed a vote of "no confidence" in President Tom Jackson and his chief of staff, Mark Johnson, in a resolution that demands their immediate resignation because of their mishandling of student protests. On April 29, 2024, 320 members of Cal Poly Humboldt's faculty and staff called for the "immediate termination" of President Jackson and his Chief of Staff Mark Johnson. On July 11, Jackson announced he would be stepping down as President of Cal Poly Humboldt.

== Military service and community involvement ==
Jackson is a veteran and serves as a member of the Rapid City Economic Development Corporation, First Interstate Bank's Advisory Board, Spearfish Economic Development Corporation, Spearfish Chamber of Commerce, and as a Board Member of Lead365.
