= Laurie Nichols =

American academic administrator

Laurie Stenberg Nichols
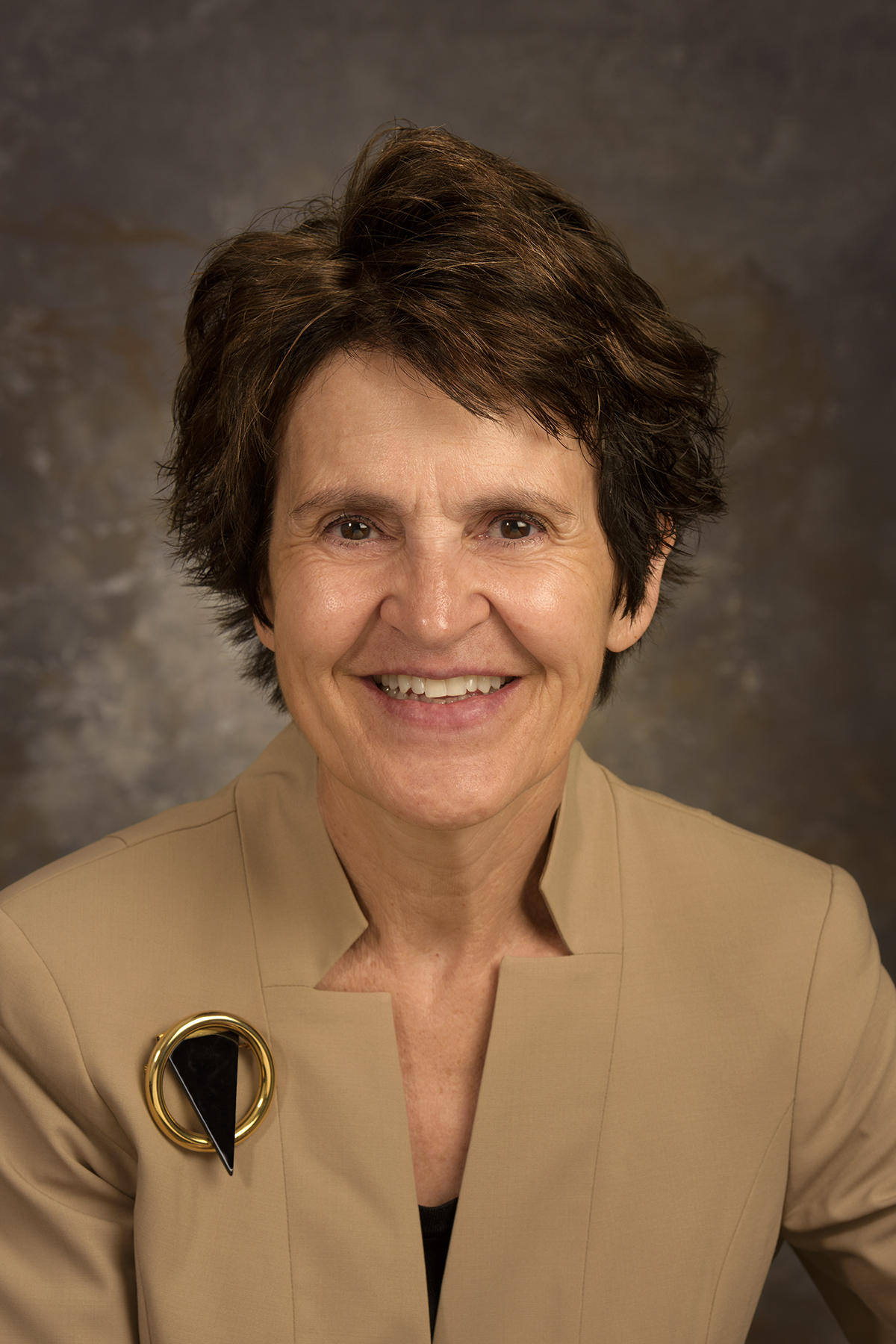
- Nichols in 2016

Interim President of Northern State University
- In office May 23, 2025 – January 5, 2026
- Preceded by: Neal Schnoor
- Succeeded by: Dr. Alan LaFave

11th President of Black Hills State University
- In office July 1, 2019 – December 11, 2023
- Preceded by: Tom Jackson Jr.
- Succeeded by: Steve Elliot

26th President of University of Wyoming
- In office May 16, 2016 – June 30, 2019
- Preceded by: Richard McGinity
- Succeeded by: Neil Theobald

Personal details
- Born: Laurie Ann Stenberg Colman, South Dakota, U.S.
- Spouse: Tim Nichols
- Children: 2
- Education: South Dakota State University (BS); Colorado State University (MEd); Ohio State University (PhD)

Academic background
- Thesis: Factors associated with the professional socialization relationships of secondary male and female home economics educators (1988)
- Doctoral advisor: Janet F. Laster

Laurie Nichols is a retired American academic administrator previously serving as the interim president at Northern State University. Nichols was also the 11th president of Black Hills State University and the 26th president of the University of Wyoming.

== Early life and education ==
Nichols was born in Colman, South Dakota. She earned a Bachelor of Science degree from South Dakota State University in 1978, followed by a master in education from Colorado State University in 1984 and a PhD in family and consumer sciences education from Ohio State University in 1988.

== Career ==
Nichols began her career at the University of Idaho. She was the dean of the College of Education and Human Sciences at South Dakota State University from 1994 to 2008, and interim president of Northern State University from August 2008 to June 2009. She was the provost and executive vice president for academic affairs at South Dakota State University from 2009 to 2016 and then was appointed the 26th president of the University of Wyoming in 2016.

Nichols served as the president of the University of Wyoming from May 16, 2016, to June 30, 2019, when she was abruptly fired by the Wyoming Board of Regents. Nichols has been the subject of an ongoing investigation, which found that Nichols had displayed a pattern of verbal abuse during her tenure at the university. She assumed the presidency of Black Hills State University in 2019, initially on an interim basis. Her appointment as president was confirmed by the South Dakota Board of Regents in December 2019. Nichols retired in December 2023 after 5 years as President. She was appointed interim president of Northern State University in the Summer of 2025 and served until the appointment of Dr. Alan LaFave in January of 2026.

== Personal life ==
With her husband Tim, Nichols has two daughters.
