= Benjamin Munson =

American physician

Hugh Benjamin Munson (January 26, 1916 – July 27, 2003) was a physician who performed abortions in Rapid City, South Dakota, both before and after legalization.

Munson was born in Central City, South Dakota to James and Rena Gilligan Munson. He graduated from Black Hills Teachers College, attended the University of South Dakota School of Medicine, and graduated from the George Washington University School of Medicine.

Munson's practice was illegal prior to the Roe vs. Wade U.S. Supreme Court decision in 1973. Until his retirement in 1986, he was the only physician in South Dakota to perform abortions.

Munson opened his practice in 1967. He was arrested in 1969 after performing an abortion on a 19-year-old patient. Munson challenged his conviction, winning in circuit court. The state appealed, and the South Dakota Supreme Court ruled against him. He appealed this decision, which was rendered moot by Roe.

In 1973, Munson discharged a 28-year-old patient, Linda Padfield, after an incomplete abortion. She died of sepsis three days later. Munson was charged with culpable negligence. Seventh Circuit Judge Merton Tice, Jr. instructed the jury to acquit, saying that the state's case was inadequate because prosecutors could not prove that Munson intended harm to his patient. Then-Attorney General Bill Janklow contended that Munson's culpability was clear.

Munson died at age 87 in a nursing home in Burlington, Vermont, of complications of Alzheimer's disease.

Munson was the father of one-time Rapid City mayor Jerry Munson.
