= The Girl Who Loved Wild Horses =

Children's picture book by Paul Goble

- Cover with The Caldecott Medal on it
- Author: Paul Goble
- Illustrator: Paul Goble
- Genre: Children’s book
- Publisher: Bradbury Press, Simon & Schuster
- Publication date: 1978
- Publication place: United States
- Media type: Print
- Pages: 31 pp
- ISBN: 978-0-689-71696-6

The Girl Who Loved Wild Horses, written and illustrated by Paul Goble, is a children's picture book originally released by Bradbury Press in 1978. It was the recipient of the Caldecott Medal for illustration in 1979. As of 1993, the book has been published by Simon & Schuster.

== Description ==
The book's 31 pages contains full-color, double-paged pen-and-ink and watercolor illustrations, reproduced in combined line and halftone lithograph. The font of the text is set in 12 pt. Century Schoolbook. Each page measures 8"x10".

== Plot ==
The story focuses on a young Native American girl who has a deep affinity for wild horses. She cares for the horses that her tribe relies on for the nomadic hunting of buffalo. One day, the herd stampedes due to a thunderstorm, while the girl is among them. She climbs onto the back of one of the horses, and is carried far away from their usual grazing grounds. The next day, the girl awakes to see a beautiful spotted stallion who identifies himself as the leader of all the wild horses, and welcomes her to live with them. Meanwhile, the girl's tribe searches for her. About one year later, two hunters spot the girl riding with the horses, but she is driven away with the rest of the herd. The hunters return to the tribe with this news, and riders are sent in pursuit. The stallion defends the girl, but she is caught when her horse stumbles. The girl returns home, but is sad to leave the horses. She falls ill with no sign of improvement. The girl asks if she can return, and her parents honor her wish to live among the wild horses again. Each year, she would return to her parents with the gift of a colt. Then one year, she does not return. When the hunters see the wild horses again, they see a mare riding alongside the stallion. They believe this horse to be the girl transformed, which brings the tribe great pride to know they have one of their own riding among them.

== Writing and illustration ==
The book features illustrations with colorful ethnographic imagery of the Plains Indians of North America typical of Goble's work. The artwork features "Goble's trademark style-thin white space outlining the stylized figures in glorious traditional Plains Indian garb". Many of the illustrations depict groups of plants and animals found in the grassland regions of North America, such as prairie dogs, bison, badgers, birds, insects, and lizards. The storytelling and corresponding art combine to show the close relationship with nature typical of traditional Native American myths, folklore, and visual arts.

== Critical reception ==
The Girl Who Loved Wild Horses has been viewed favorably by critics, particularly for its artwork and positive portrayal of Native American culture. School Library Journal expressed that "the real strength of the book lies in the highly detailed, full-page lithographs finely printed in bright colors" and "the illustrations alone make this worth owning". The New York Times has referred to Goble as a "fine artist", having an "energetic, hard-edged dexterity" to his style, who "creates panoramas of the wild horses and their environment that are both dramatic and beautifully detailed". In The New York Times review of the book by Georgess McHargue, she declares that "anyone who admires Indian culture will appreciate this fully authentic portrayal of Plains camps, customs and costumes". The Horn Book Magazine has said "both storytelling and art express the harmony with and love of nature which characterizes Native American culture". According to Kirkus Reviews, "Goble tells the story soberly, allowing it to settle, to find its own level", with illustrations "in the familiar striking Goble style, but softened out here and there with masses of flowers and foliage".

== Awards ==
The book received the Caldecott Medal for illustration in 1979. It was included in the Scholastic Corporation's "200 for 2000" list of best children's book of the millennium.

== See also ==
- Plains Indians
- Bison hunting
- Native American mythology
- Horse culture
- Feral horse
- Mustang

Awards
Preceded by Noah's Ark	Caldecott Medal recipient 1979	Succeeded by Ox-Cart Man
