= Dick Termes =

American painter

- Termes in his art gallery.
- Education: BS Art BHSU, MA Art University of Wyoming, MFA Otis College of Art and Design
- Known for: Painting
- Notable work: Termespheres
- Movement: Perspective
- Website: Official Website

Dick Termes is an American artist who uses a six-point perspective system that he devised to create unique paintings on large spheres called Termespheres. He is the world's leading spherical artist. In 2014, Dick was inducted into the South Dakota Hall of Fame. He currently lives and works in Spearfish, South Dakota.

== Termespheres ==
Termespheres are paintings on spherical canvases that capture an entire environment (up, down, left, right, front and back). Their style was inspired by Termes's desire to "paint the total picture." Termespheres are typically hung by small chains and rotated with electric ceiling motors to reveal a complete, closed universe as the spheres slowly rotate.

One of his termespheres is most famously used on the cover of an edition of A Brief History of Time of the late physicist Stephen Hawking.

== Workshops and lectures ==
Termes conducts lectures and workshops for schools, universities, and the general public, revealing the connections between art and math/science in his work.

== Personal life and education ==
In 2012, this design of Termes' was proposed as the new flag of South Dakota by Representative Bernie Hunhoff, although no change was ultimately made.

Dick Termes was born in California, where his father worked in a shipyard.

He received a B.S. with an art major from Black Hills State University in 1964, a master's degree in art in 1969 from the University of Wyoming (the time when the idea for the Termesphere was first developed) and Masters of Fine Arts at Otis Art Institute of Los Angeles County, 1971. He joined the South Dakota State Arts Council in 1972.

In 1979, he married puppeteer Markie Stolz. They have two sons, Lang and Kabe.

== Awards ==
- South Dakota Hall of Fame Induction, Chamberlain SD. 2014
- Rushmore Honors Award, Rapid City SD. 2006
- Breckenridge Festival of Film, Documentary TERMESPHERES: TOTAL WORLDS 2001
- Governor's Award for Distinction in Creative Achievement 1999
- S.D. Museum of Art- Artistic Achievement Citation, 1986
- Four South Dakota Arts Council Fellowship Grants, 1976-80-84-94
- Three Semesters paid by Otis Art Institute, Los Angeles Ca.1969–71 for MFA
