= Paul Goble (writer and illustrator) =

British-American writer and illustrator

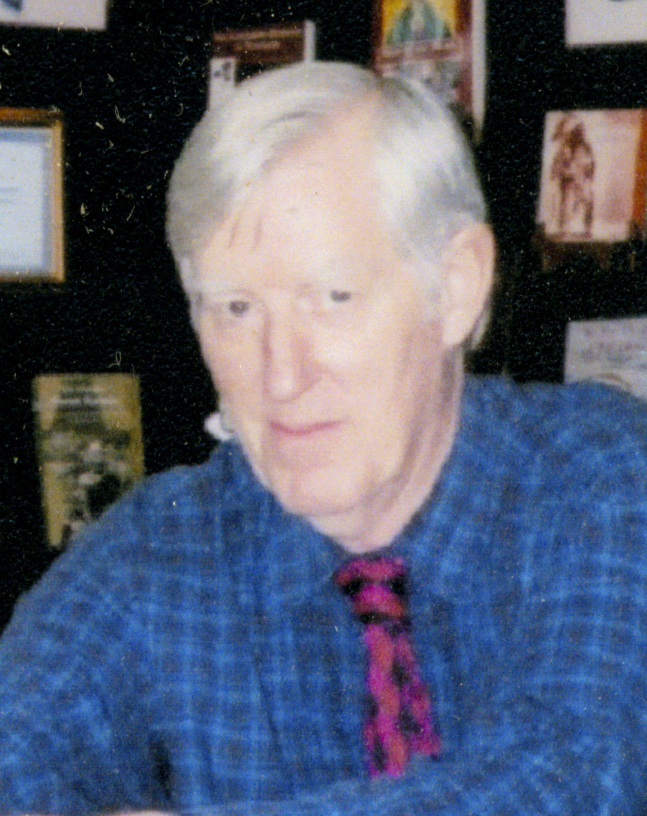
- Goble in 2008
- Born: 27 September 1933; Haslemere, England
- Died: 5 January 2017 (aged 83); Rapid City, South Dakota, U.S.
- Occupations: Illustrator, writer
- Spouses: Dorothy Lee (m. 1960; div. 1978); Janet Tiller (m. 1978; died 2014)
- Writing career
- Genre: Children's picture books
- Subject: Native Americans
- Notable work: The Girl Who Loved Wild Horses
- Notable awards: Caldecott Medal; 1979

Paul Goble (27 September 1933 – 5 January 2017) was a British-American writer and illustrator of children's books, especially Native American stories. His book The Girl Who Loved Wild Horses won a Caldecott Medal in 1979.

== Biography ==
Goble was born in Haslemere, England. He grew up in Oxford where his father was a harpsichord maker, and his mother a professional musician. Goble studied at the Central School of Art in London and then worked as an art teacher, as a furniture designer and as an industrial consultant. His first children's book, Red Hawk's Account of Custer's Last Battle, was published in 1969.

In 1977, he moved to the Black Hills in South Dakota and became closely acquainted with Chief Edgar Red Cloud. Goble was greatly influenced by Plains Indian culture and his subsequent children's books reflect this.

In 1979, Goble received the Caldecott Medal award, presented each year for the most distinguished children's picture book, for his 1978 book The Girl Who Loved Wild Horses. Most of his books, retellings of ancient stories, are told from the perspectives of different tribes among the Native Nations.

Goble became a U.S. citizen in 1984. He died of Parkinson's disease on 5 January 2017, aged 83.

A biography, Paul Goble: Storyteller, written by University of Manitoba professor Gregory Bryan, was published shortly after Goble's death.

== Personal life ==
Goble was married twice. His first wife, Dorothy Lee (sister of actress Barbara Lee), whom he married in England in 1960, was credited as co-author on several of his books. They had two children before divorcing in 1978. Later that same year in South Dakota he married Janet Tiller, with whom he had a son. Janet Goble died in July 2014.

== Artwork ==
Illustrations by Goble are held in various collections, including that of the Library of Congress.

== Awards ==
- Caldecott Medal (1979)
- Regina Medal (2006)
- Honorary Doctor of Humane Letters, South Dakota State University
- Children's Book Council Children's Choice (2004)
- Library of Congress' Children's Book of the Year

== Publications ==
- The Boy & His Mud Horses (World Wisdom, 2010) ISBN 978-1-935493-11-2
- The Earth Made New (World Wisdom, 2009) ISBN 978-1-933316-67-3
- Tipi: Home of the Nomadic Buffalo Hunters (World Wisdom, 2007)
- All Our Relatives: Traditional Native American Thoughts About Nature (World Wisdom, 2005)
- The Gospel of the Redman (World Wisdom, 2005)
- Song of Creation (Eerdmans Books for Young Readers, 2004)
- Mystic Horse (HarperCollins, 2003) Children's Book Council Children's Choice
- Storm Maker’s Tipi (Atheneum/Richard Jackson Books, 2001)
- Paul Goble Gallery: Three Native American Stories (Simon & Schuster Children's Publishing, 1999)
- Iktomi Loses His Eyes (Scholastic, 1999)
- Iktomi and the Coyote: A Plains Indian Story (Orchard Books, 1998)
- The Legend of the White Buffalo Woman (National Geographic Children's Books, 1998)
- The Return of the Buffaloes: A Plains Indian Story about Famine and Renewal of the Earth (National Geographic Children's Books, 1996)
- Remaking the Earth: A Creation Story from the Great Plains of North America (Scholastic, 1996)
- The Art of Paul Goble, Author-Illustrator (Center, 1995)
- Iktomi and the Buzzard: A Plains Indian Story (Orchard Books, 1994)
- Hau Kola: Hello Friend (R.C. Owen, 1994)
- Adopted by the Eagles: A Plains Indian Story of Friendship and Treachery (1994)
- The Lost Children: The Boys Who Were Neglected (Simon & Schuster Children's Publishing, 1993)
- Crow Chief: A Plains Indian Story (Orchard Books, 1992)
- Love Flute (Bradbury Press, 1992)
- I Sing for the Animals (Bradbury Press, 1991)
- Iktomi & the Buffalo Skull (Orchard Books, 1991)
- Iktomi and the Ducks: A Plains Indian Story (Orchard Books, 1990)
- Dream Wolf (Atheneum/Richard Jackson Books, 1990)
- Beyond the Ridge (Simon & Schuster Children's Publishing, 1989)
- Iktomi and the Berries: A Plains Indian Story (Orchard Books, 1989)
- Iktomi and the Boulder: A Plains Indian Story (Orchard Books, 1988)
- Her Seven Brothers (Aladdin, 1988)
- Death of the Iron Horse (Atheneum/Richard Jackson Books, 1987)
- The Great Race of the Birds and Animals (Bradbury Press, 1985)
- Buffalo Woman (Bradbury Press, 1984)
- Star Boy (Atheneum/Richard Jackson Books, 1983)
- The Gift of the Sacred Dog (Bradbury Press, 1980) (this book was shown on the PBS TV series Reading Rainbow 17 June 1983)
- The Girl Who Loved Wild Horses (Scholastic Book Services, 1979) Caldecott Medal
- The Friendly Wolf (Simon & Schuster, 1974) (with Dorothy Goble)
- Lone Bull’s Horse Raid (Bradbury Press, 1973) (with Dorothy Goble)
- Hundreds in the Hands: Brave Eagle's Account of the Fetterman Fight, 21 December 1866 (Macmillan, 1972) (with Dorothy Goble)
- Red Hawk's Account of Custer's Last Battle: The Battle of the Little Bighorn, 25 June 1876 (Pantheon Books, 1969) (with Dorothy Goble)

== Translated work ==
- Vahşi atları seven kız [The girl who loved wild horses] (Maya Kitap, 2016) (translated into Turkish by Şeyda Uysal)
