= Raymond W. Carpenter =

United States Army general

Carpenter, Raymond W.
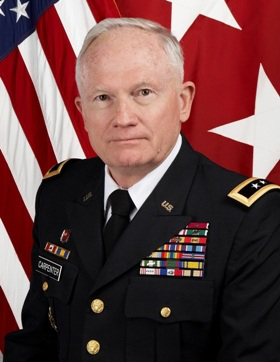
- Major General Carpenter as acting Director, Army National Guard
- Born: 1948 (age 77–78); Sturgis, South Dakota, U.S.
- Military career
- Allegiance: United States of America
- Branch: United States Army
- Service years: 1967–1974: NCO; 1974–2011: Officer
- Rank: Major general
- Units: South Dakota Army National Guard; Army National Guard
- Commands: 842nd Engineer Company; 109th Engineer Battalion; 109th Engineer Group; Director, Army National Guard
- Conflicts: Vietnam War
- Awards: Distinguished Service Medal (U.S. Army); Legion of Merit; Meritorious Service Medal; Army Commendation Medal; Army Achievement Medal; Army Reserve Component Achievement Medal; National Defense Service Medal; Vietnam Service Medal; Global War on Terrorism Service Medal; Humanitarian Service Medal; Armed Forces Reserve Medal; Army Service Ribbon; Army Reserve Components Overseas Training Ribbon; Vietnam Campaign Medal; South Dakota Achievement Ribbon

Raymond W. Carpenter (born 1948) is a retired United States Army major general who served as acting Director of the Army National Guard.

== Early life and education ==
Raymond W. Carpenter was born in Sturgis, South Dakota in 1948, and graduated from Sturgis Brown High School in 1966.

In 1967 he joined the South Dakota Army National Guard as a member of the 109th Engineer Battalion.

In 1975 Carpenter completed a Bachelor of Business Administration degree in business at Black Hills State University. He received a Master of Business Administration degree from the University of South Dakota in 1994. Carpenter is a graduate of the Engineer Officer Basic and Advanced Courses, and the United States Army Command and General Staff College. He is also a 1997 graduate of the United States Army War College.

== Vietnam War ==
Carpenter transferred to the United States Navy, was trained as a Vietnamese linguist at the Defense Language Institute, and served at the Naval Support Facility in Da Nang Air Base, South Vietnam.

== Post-Vietnam War ==
Upon returning to the United States, Carpenter continued his service in the South Dakota Army National Guard, receiving his commission as a second lieutenant of Engineers in 1974. He carried out several assignments in the 842nd Engineer Company, and commanded the company from 1978 to 1982.

He continued to advance in positions of more rank and responsibility, including executive officer of Task Force Rushmore, a 5,000 soldier organization which was sent to Panama on a humanitarian mission in 1993 and built 27 kilometers of road while rebuilding 10 schools and 14 clinics. He then commanded the 109th Engineer Battalion from 1993 to 1995.

After serving as director of personnel and director of human resources for the South Dakota Army National Guard, Carpenter commanded the 109th Engineer Group from 1998 to 1999.

After serving as the South Dakota Army National Guard's chief of staff from 2000 to 2003, Carpenter was promoted to brigadier general and assigned as the organization's assistant adjutant general – Army. From 2004 to 2006, Carpenter simultaneously served as deputy commander of the Maneuver Support Center at Fort Leonard Wood, Missouri.

== National Guard Bureau ==
In April, 2006 Carpenter was assigned as special assistant to the director of the Army National Guard at the National Guard Bureau. He was promoted to major general in December 2006. In April, 2009 he was assigned as acting deputy director of the Army National Guard.

In May 2009 Carpenter became acting Director of the Army National Guard, following the retirement of Clyde A. Vaughn. Timothy J. Kadavy succeeded Carpenter as deputy director.

The United States Senate did not act on the nomination of the individual named to succeed Vaughn, Joseph Taluto, who retired in 2010. As a result, Carpenter continued to serve as acting director until he retired in November 2011. He was succeeded by William E. Ingram, Jr.

== Civilian career ==
In November 2021, Carpenter became a civilian aide to the United States Secretary of the Army.

== Awards and decorations ==
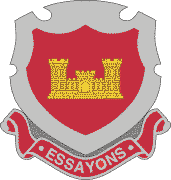
Army Staff Identification Badge
United States Army Corps of Engineers Distinctive Unit Insignia

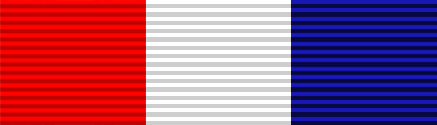
Army Distinguished Service Medal
Legion of Merit with one bronze oak leaf cluster
Meritorious Service Medal with silver oak leaf cluster
Army Commendation Medal with two oak leaf clusters
Army Achievement Medal with three oak leaf clusters
Army Reserve Component Achievement Medal (with 1 Silver and 3 Bronze Oak Leaf Clusters)
National Defense Service Medal with two bronze service stars
Vietnam Service Medal with four service stars
Global War on Terrorism Service Medal
Humanitarian Service Medal
Armed Forces Reserve Medal with gold Hourglass device
Army Service Ribbon
Army Reserve Components Overseas Training Ribbon with bronze award numeral 4
Vietnam Campaign Medal
South Dakota Achievement Ribbon
South Dakota Distinguished Service Award
South Dakota Recruiting Medal
South Dakota Service Medal (with Service Device)
South Dakota Desert Storm Ribbon
South Dakota Distinguished Unit Award with oak leaf cluster
South Dakota Unit Citation

=== Other awards ===
Carpenter is a 1999 recipient of the Silver De Fleury Medal from the Army Engineer Association. In 2012 he received the Raymond S. McLain Medal from the Association of the United States Army.

== Chronological list of officer assignments ==
1. July 1974 – August 1974, Platoon Leader, Detachment 1, 842d Engineer Company, South Dakota Army National Guard, Belle Fourche, South Dakota
2. August 1974 – October 1974, Student, Engineer School, Engineer Officer Basic Course, Fort Belvoir, Virginia
3. October 1974 – June 1976, Platoon Leader, Detachment 1, 842d Engineer Company, South Dakota Army National Guard, Belle Fourche, South Dakota
4. July 1976 – October 1978, Platoon Leader, Detachment 3, 842d Engineer Company, South Dakota Army National Guard, Deadwood, South Dakota
5. November 1978 – July 1982, Company Commander, 842d Engineer Company, South Dakota Army National Guard, Spearfish, South Dakota
6. August 1982 – April 1985, S-4, Headquarters, Headquarters Detachment, 109th Engineer Battalion, South Dakota Army National Guard, Sturgis, South Dakota
7. April 1985 – July 1986, Executive Officer, Headquarters, Headquarters Detachment, 109th Engineer Battalion, South Dakota Army National Guard, Sturgis, South Dakota
8. August 1986 – August 1987, S-3, Headquarters, Headquarters Detachment, 109th Engineer Battalion, South Dakota Army National Guard, Sturgis, South Dakota
9. September 1987 – December 1989, Executive Officer, Headquarters, Headquarters Detachment, 109th Engineer Battalion, South Dakota Army National Guard, Sturgis, South Dakota
10. January 1990 – August 1991, Chief Internal Review, Headquarters, State Area Command, South Dakota Army National Guard, Rapid City, South Dakota
11. August 1991 – September 1993, Facilities Management Officer, Headquarters, State Area Command, South Dakota Army National Guard, Rapid City, South Dakota
12. September 1993 – June 1995, Battalion Commander, Headquarters, Headquarters Detachment, 109th Engineer Battalion, South Dakota Army National Guard, Sturgis, South Dakota
13. July 1995 – June 1996, Director of Personnel, Headquarters, State Area Command, South Dakota Army National Guard, Rapid City, South Dakota
14. June 1996 – June 1997, Student, United States Army War College, Carlisle Barracks, Pennsylvania
15. June 1997 – May 1998, Director of Human Resources, Headquarters, State Area Command, South Dakota Army National Guard Rapid City, South Dakota
16. May 1998 – June 1999, Group Commander, Headquarters, Headquarters Company, 109th Engineer Group, South Dakota Army National Guard, Rapid City, South Dakota
17. July 1999 – January 2000, Director of Plans, Operations and Training, Headquarters State Area Command, South Dakota National Guard, Rapid City, South Dakota
18. February 2000 – March 2003, Chief of Staff, Headquarters, State Area Command, South Dakota Army National Guard, Rapid City, South Dakota
19. April 2003 – April 2006, Assistant Adjutant General, South Dakota Army National Guard, Rapid City, South Dakota
20. September 2004 – April 2006, Dual-hatted as the Deputy Commanding General, Maneuver Support Center, Fort Leonard Wood, Missouri
21. April 2006 – April 2009, Special Assistant to the Director of the Army National Guard, National Guard Bureau, Arlington, Virginia
22. April 2009 – May 2009, Acting Deputy Director, Army National Guard, National Guard Bureau, Arlington, Virginia
23. May 2009 – November 2011, acting director, Army National Guard, National Guard Bureau, Arlington, Virginia

== Effective dates of promotions ==
- Major General, December 9, 2006
- Brigadier General, April 1, 2003
- Colonel, July 1, 1995
- Lieutenant Colonel, October 1, 1990
- Major, April 26, 1985
- Captain, July 28, 1979
- First Lieutenant, July 28, 1977
- Second Lieutenant, July 29, 1974

== External resources ==
Raymond W. Carpenter at National Guard Bureau General Officer Management Office
