= Clyde A. Vaughn =

United States Army general

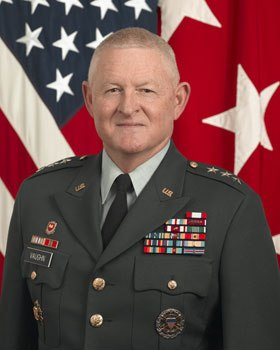
- Vaughn as the director of the Army National Guard
- Born: April 27, 1946 (age 80); Columbia, Missouri, U.S.
- Military career
- Allegiance: United States of America
- Branch: United States Army
- Service years: 1969–2009
- Rank: Lieutenant General
- Unit: Army National Guard
- Commands: C Company, 1140th Engineer Battalion; Task Force, National Guard Bureau Operations and Training Division; Exercise Support Command, United States Army South; Chief, Operations Division, Army National Guard; Director, Army National Guard
- Awards: Distinguished Service Medal (U.S. Army); Defense Superior Service Medal; Legion of Merit; Meritorious Service Medal; Army Commendation Medal; Army Achievement Medal

Clyde A. Vaughn (born April 27, 1946) is a retired United States Army Lieutenant General who served as Director of the Army National Guard.

== Early life ==
Clyde Allen Vaughn Jr. was born in Columbia, Missouri on April 27, 1946. He graduated from Dexter High School in Dexter, Missouri, received a Bachelor of Science degree in education from Southeast Missouri State University in 1968 and became a high school history teacher and football coach in Dexter, Missouri. While at college he became a member of the Sigma Tau Gamma fraternity, Alpha Phi chapter.

== Start of military career ==
Vaughn enlisted in the Missouri Army National Guard in 1969. He received his commission as a Second Lieutenant of Engineers after graduating from Officer Candidate School in 1974.

His early assignments included platoon leader and staff assignments, primarily in the 1140th Engineer Battalion, and he commanded the battalion's Company C from 1980 to 1983.

Vaughn also served temporary active duty assignments in Central and South America, including postings to United States Army South in Panama, and operations and training officer (G3) for Task Force 1169 in Ecuador.

He later carried out assignments at the National Guard Bureau before serving as Senior National Guard Advisor for U.S. Army South from 1994 to 1995.

== Later career ==
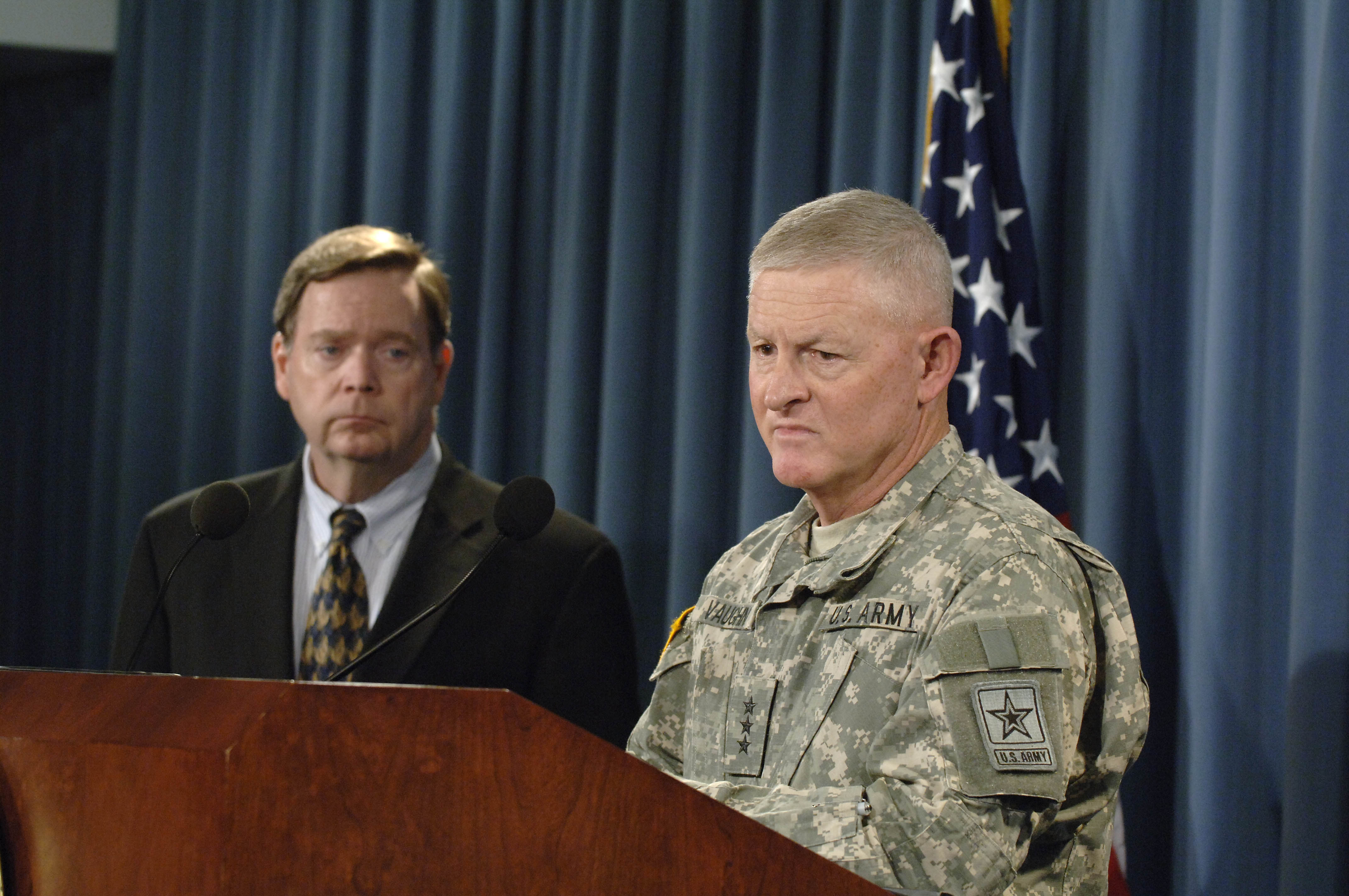
Lt. Gen. Vaughn (right) and Assistant Secretary of Defense for Homeland Defense Paul McHale (left) brief reporters in the Pentagon on the involvement of the military in border security operations on May 18, 2006.

From 1997 to 2000 Vaughn was Chief of the Operations Division at National Guard Bureau, and he was assigned as the Army's Deputy Director for Military Support to Civil Authorities from 2000 to 2002. He was on Interstate 395 en route to the Pentagon on the morning of September 11, 2001. He observed the hijacked Flight 77 Boeing 757 in flight, parked his car, ran to the building, and took part in the initial response to the casualties and damage caused when the plane crashed into the west side of the building.

In September, 2002 Vaughn was assigned as Deputy Director of the Army National Guard, succeeding Michael J. Squier, and he served until November, 2003.

From November, 2003 to June, 2005 Vaughn was Assistant for National Guard Matters to the Chairman of the Joint Chiefs of Staff.

Vaughn was appointed Director of the Army National Guard in June, 2005, and he served until retiring in 2009. He was succeeded by Raymond W. Carpenter in an acting capacity until William E. Ingram Jr. became director in 2011.

One of the initiatives that operated during Vaughn's tenure, the Guard Recruiting Assistance Program (G-RAP), was later the subject of controversy and investigations. G-RAP offered a $2,000 bonus to Army National Guard members for each new recruit they helped bring into the National Guard during its expansion as part of the global war on terrorism. As a recruiting tool, G-RAP was widely viewed as a success, because it helped the National Guard meet or exceed its annual end strength goal of 350,000. Subsequent investigations indicated that abuse of the program might have involved more than $10 million in fraudulent bonus payments, and perhaps as much as $50 million. In 2015, Vaughn received a written reprimand from the U.S. Army, in which senior leaders criticized him for mismanaging G-RAP; Vaughn strongly denied the allegations. Later investigations revealed that some Army leaders overstated the amount of fraud; of more than 106,000 soldiers, who received payments under G-RAP, fewer than 130 were convicted of fraud, and the fraud involved less than $3 million in a program which expended $350 million.

== Education ==
In addition to his degree from Southeast Missouri State, Vaughn is a 1989 graduate of the United States Army Command and General Staff College. He graduated from the United States Army War College in 1994, simultaneously receiving a Master of Public Administration degree from Shippensburg University of Pennsylvania.

== Major awards ==
Vaughn's awards include: Distinguished Service Medal; Defense Superior Service Medal; Legion of Merit (5); Meritorious Service Medal (6); Army Commendation Medal; and Army Achievement Medal (2).

In 2010 he received the Raymond S. McLain Medal from the Association of the United States Army.

== Legacy ==
In 2010 the Army National Guard's GED Plus program, which enables recruits to complete their high school equivalency before beginning their initial training, was named for him. Vaughn spearheaded the creation of the program in 2006.

== Family ==
Vaughn's father, Clyde A. Vaughn Sr., served in the National Guard as a warrant officer and retired in 1981. Vaughn is married to Carolyn K. Vaughn. Their son Chad is a fighter pilot in the United States Marine Corps.

== Chronological list of assignments ==
1. August 1974 – January 1976, Platoon Leader, 1221st Transportation Company, Dexter, Missouri
2. January 1976 – May 1976, Platoon Leader, C Company, 1140th Engineer Battalion, Sikeston, Missouri
3. May 1976 – January 1978, Platoon Leader, Detachment 1, A Company, 1140th Engineer Battalion, Charleston, Missouri
4. January 1978 – February 1979, Reconnaissance Officer, Headquarters Company, 1140th Engineer Battalion, Cape Girardeau, Missouri
5. February 1979 – January 1980, Engineering Officer, 1140th Engineer Battalion, Cape Girardeau, Missouri
6. January 1980 – November 1980, Executive Officer, C Company, 1140th Engineer Battalion, Sikeston, Missouri
7. November 1980 – August 1983, Company Commander, C Company, 1140th Engineer Battalion, Sikeston, Missouri
8. August 1983 – August 1984, Utilities Engineer, 135th Engineer Group, Cape Girardeau, Missouri
9. September 1984 – December 1984, Operations Officer, 135th Engineer Group, Cape Girardeau, Missouri
10. December 1984 – June 1985, Operations Officer, 135th Engineer Group, Fort Clayton, Panama
11. July 1985 – November 1985, Exercise Officer, 193rd Infantry Brigade, Fort Clayton, Panama
12. November 1985 – June 1986, G3 Staff Officer, 193rd Infantry Brigade, Fort Clayton, Panama
13. June 1986 – June 1987, Executive Director, C Engineer Division, Deputy Chief of Staff for Operations, United States Army South, Fort Clayton, Panama
14. June 1987 – November 1987, S3 Officer, Task Force 1169, Ecuador
15. November 1987 – July 1988, Executive Director, C Engineer Division, Deputy Chief of Staff for Operations, United States Army South, Fort Clayton, Panama
16. August 1988 – June 1989, Student, United States Army Command and General Staff College, Fort Leavenworth, Kansas
17. June 1989 – July 1990, Staff Action Officer, National Guard Bureau, Pentagon, Washington, District of Columbia
18. July 1990 – May 1992, Task Force Commander, National Guard Bureau Operations and Training Division, Army National Guard Readiness Center, Arlington, Virginia
19. June 1992 – May 1993, Chief, Operations and Exercises Branch, Army National Guard Operations Division, Army National Guard Readiness Center, Arlington, Virginia
20. June 1993 – June 1994, Student, United States Army War College, Carlisle Barracks, Pennsylvania
21. July 1994 – August 1995, Senior Army National Guard Advisor for Reserve Affairs, United States Army South, Fort Clayton, Panama
22. September 1995 – November 1997, Commander, Exercise Support Command and Deputy Chief of Staff Reserve Affairs-National Guard, United States Army South, Fort Clayton, Panama
23. December 1997 – February 2000, Chief, Operations Division, Army National Guard Readiness Center, Arlington, Virginia
24. February 2000 – September 2002, Deputy Chief of Staff, G3, United States Army, Pentagon, Washington, District of Columbia
25. September 2002 – November 2003, Deputy Director, Army National Guard, Army National Guard Readiness Center, Arlington, Virginia
26. November 2003 – June 2005, Assistant to the Chairman of the Joint Chiefs of Staff for National Guard Matters, Office of the Chairman Joint Chiefs of Staff, Pentagon, Washington, District of Columbia
27. June 2005 – May 2009, Director, Army National Guard, Army National Guard Readiness Center, Arlington, Virginia

== Awards and decorations ==
Army Distinguished Service Medal
Defense Superior Service Medal
Legion of Merit (with 4 bronze oak leaf clusters)
Meritorious Service Medal (with 1 silver oak leaf cluster)
Army Commendation Medal
Army Achievement Medal (with 1 bronze oak leaf cluster)
Joint Meritorious Unit Award
Army Superior Unit Award
Army Reserve Component Achievement Medal (with 1 silver oak leaf cluster and 2 bronze oak leaf clusters)
National Defense Service Medal with 2 bronze service stars
Global War on Terrorism Service Medal
Humanitarian Service Medal
Armed Forces Reserve Medal with gold Hourglass device
Army Service Ribbon
Army Overseas Service Ribbon with bronze award numeral 2
Army Reserve Components Overseas Training Ribbon with award numeral 4

== Effective dates of promotions ==
Promotions
Insignia	Rank	Date
	Lieutenant General	June 15, 2005
	Major General	November 10, 2003
	Brigadier General	August 1, 2000
	Colonel	February 11, 1994
	Lieutenant Colonel	May 2, 1990
	Major	July 2, 1985
	Captain	December 9, 1980
	First Lieutenant	August 9, 1977
	Second Lieutenant	August 10, 1974

== External resources ==
Clyde A. Vaughn at National Guard Bureau General Officer Management Office
