= Walter E. Fountain =

United States Army officer

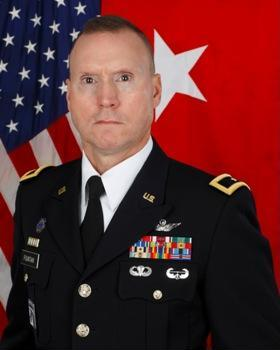
- Fountain as acting Deputy Director of the Army National Guard, 2013
- Born: November 7, 1961 (age 65); Prague, Oklahoma, U.S.
- Military career
- Allegiance: United States of America
- Branch: United States Army
- Service years: 1980–2020
- Rank: Major General
- Units: Oklahoma Army National Guard; Army National Guard; United States Northern Command
- Commands: 1st Battalion, 245th Aviation; 90th Troop Command
- Conflicts: Iraq War
- Awards: Army Distinguished Service Medal; Defense Superior Service Medal; Bronze Star Medal; Meritorious Service Medal; Army Commendation Medal; Army Achievement Medal

Walter E. Fountain (born November 7, 1961) is a retired United States Army officer who attained the rank of major general. In his final assignment, he served beginning in January 2018 as Director of Domestic Operations and Force Development at the National Guard Bureau. His previous assignments include Assistant to the Chairman of the Joint Chiefs of Staff for National Guard Matters, deputy director for Domestic Operations (J-3) at United States Northern Command, Assistant Adjutant General of the Oklahoma National Guard, and acting deputy director of the Army National Guard.

== Early life ==
Walter Emery Fountain was born in Prague, Oklahoma, on November 7, 1961. He enlisted in the Oklahoma Army National Guard in 1980, and was trained as a UH-1 helicopter mechanic.

== Start of military career ==
In 1981 he completed Officer Candidate School and received his commission as a second lieutenant of Infantry. Fountain later became qualified in the Aviation branch and advanced through several command and staff assignments. He became a full-time member of the National Guard in 1986. His command positions included: Company C, 1st Battalion 245th Aviation Regiment, Lexington, Oklahoma (1991–1994); Airfield, Headquarters, State Area Command, Oklahoma City, Oklahoma (1994–1996); Army Aviation Support Facility, Headquarters, State Area Command, Oklahoma City, Oklahoma (1996–1997); 1st Battalion, 245th Aviation, Tulsa, Oklahoma (2001–2003); and 90th Troop Command, Oklahoma City, Oklahoma (2003–2005).

Fountain is a veteran of the Iraq War, having served as Chief of National Guard Affairs for Multi-National Corps – Iraq at Camp Victory, Baghdad from 2008 to 2009.

== Career as a general officer ==
In November, 2011 Fountain was promoted to brigadier general and assigned as the Oklahoma National Guard's Assistant Adjutant General – Army. He served in this position until July, 2012 when he was appointed a Special Assistant to the Director of the Army National Guard.

Fountain served as acting deputy director of the Army National Guard in 2013, following the departure of Timothy J. Kadavy for an assignment in Afghanistan and prior to the arrival of Kadavy's replacement, Judd H. Lyons. He again acted as deputy director from January, 2014 to March, 2015, while Deputy Director Judd H. Lyons acted as Director of the Army National Guard. In June, 2015 Lyons was reassigned and Fountain again became acting deputy director, pending selection of permanent replacement.

In October, 2015 Fountain was assigned as deputy director for domestic operations (J-3) at United States Northern Command.

Fountain was assigned as Special Assistant to the Chief of the National Guard Bureau and promoted to major general in October, 2016. In December, 2016 he was assigned as Assistant to the Chairman of the Joint Chiefs of Staff for National Guard Matters. In January 2018, he was assigned as Director of Domestic Operations and Force Development at the National Guard Bureau. He retired in 2020.

== Education ==
In 1996 Fountain completed a Bachelor of Science degree in Applied Sciences at Thomas Edison State College in Trenton, New Jersey. He received a Master of Science degree in Natural and Applied Sciences from Oklahoma State University in 1998. In 2002 Fountain graduated from the United States Army War College with a Master's degree in Strategic Studies.

In addition to the Army War College, Fountain's military education includes: the Infantry Officer Basic Course; Aviation Officer Advanced Course; Air Assault School; Airborne School; United States Army Command and General Staff College; Joint Air Command and Control Course; Joint and Combined Warfighting Course; and Joint Task Force Commanders Course.

Fountain has also completed executive-level seminars and similar education, to include: Level IV Antiterrorism Executive Seminar; General Officer/Senior Executive Service Force Integration Course; National Security Management Course, Maxwell School of Citizenship and Public Affairs, Syracuse University; and George C. Marshall Center Senior Executive Seminar, Central Asia After ISAF Transition.

== Family ==
Fountain has been married to the former Elizabeth Ann Thompson since 2007. Mrs. Fountain graduated from Oklahoma State University, where she was a sorority sister of Governor Mary Fallin.

== Awards ==
- Army Distinguished Service Medal
- Defense Superior Service Medal
- Bronze Star Medal
- Meritorious Service Medal (with 2 Bronze Oak Leaf Clusters)
- Army Commendation Medal
- Army Achievement Medal
- Army Reserve Components Achievement Medal (with 1 Silver and 2 Bronze Oak Leaf Clusters)
- National Defense Service Medal (with Bronze Service Star)
- Iraq Campaign Medal (with Bronze Service Star)
- Global War on Terrorism Service Medal
- Humanitarian Service Medal
- Armed Forces Reserve Medal (with Silver Hourglass Device and 'M' Device)
- Joint Meritorious Unit Award
- Army Service Ribbon
- Army Reserve Component Overseas Training Ribbon (with Bronze Numeral 2)
- Army Master Aviator Badge
- Parachutist Badge
- Air Assault Badge

== Assignments ==
1. December 1981 – November 1982, platoon leader, Detachment 1, Company A, 1st Battalion 179th Infantry, Fairfax, Oklahoma
2. November 1982 – July 1983, Student, Rotary Wing Aviation Course, Fort Rucker, Alabama
3. July 1983 – March 1986, Pilot, Detachment 2, Headquarters and Headquarters Company, 45th Infantry Brigade, Lexington, Oklahoma
4. April 1986 – September 1987, Section Commander, Detachment 1, Headquarters and Headquarters Company, 45th Infantry Brigade, Lexington, Oklahoma
5. September 1987 – February 1989, S-1, Troop Command (Aviation), Lexington, Oklahoma
6. February 1989 – September 1991, Platoon Leader, Company B, 1st Battalion 245th Aviation, Lexington, Oklahoma
7. October 1991 – September 1994, Commander, Company C, 1st Battalion 245th Aviation, Lexington, Oklahoma
8. September 1994 – August 1996, Airfield Commander, Headquarters, State Area Command, Oklahoma City, Oklahoma
9. September 1996 – August 1997, Commander, Army Aviation Support Facility, Headquarters, State Area Command, Oklahoma City, Oklahoma
10. September 1997 – August 2001, S-3 (Air), Headquarters, State Area Command, Oklahoma City, Oklahoma
11. September 2001 – August 2003, Commander, 1st Battalion, 245th Aviation, Tulsa, Oklahoma
12. September 2003 – June 2005, Commander, 90th Troop Command, Oklahoma City, Oklahoma
13. July 2005 – November 2008, Director, Office of the Deputy Chief of Staff, Operations, Joint Force Headquarters, Oklahoma City, Oklahoma
14. November 2008 – June 2009, Chief, National Guard Affairs, Multi-National Corps – Baghdad, Iraq
15. June 2009 – November 2011, Director, Office of the Deputy Chief of Staff, Operations, Joint Force Headquarters, Oklahoma City, Oklahoma
16. November 2011 – July 2012, Assistant Adjutant General – Army, Joint Force Headquarters, Oklahoma City, Oklahoma
17. July 2012 – September 2013, Support Special Assistant to the Director, Army National Guard, National Guard Bureau, Arlington, Virginia
18. October 2013 – September 2014, Operations Special Assistant to the Director, Army National Guard, National Guard Bureau, Arlington, Virginia
19. October 2014 – October 2015, Special Assistant to the Director, Army National Guard Liaison for Force Structure and Strategic Policy, National Guard Bureau, Arlington, Virginia
20. October 2015 – September 2016, deputy director, Operations, J-3, United States Northern Command, Peterson Air Force Base, Colorado
21. October 2016 - December 2016, Special Assistant to the Chief, National Guard Bureau, Arlington, Virginia,
22. December 2016 – December 2017, Assistant to the Chairman of the Joint Chiefs of Staff for National Guard Matters, Washington, District of Columbia
23. January 2018 - 2020, Director, Domestic Operations and Force Development NGB J-3/7, National Guard Bureau, Arlington, Virginia

== Effective dates of promotions ==
- Major General, October 21, 2016
- Brigadier General, November 8, 2011
- Colonel, September 11, 2003
- Lieutenant Colonel, October 10, 1996
- Major, December 4, 1991
- Captain, April 2, 1987
- First Lieutenant, December 2, 1984
- Second Lieutenant, December 3, 1981
