= George K. Sisler =

United States Army Medal of Honor recipient

George Kenton Sisler
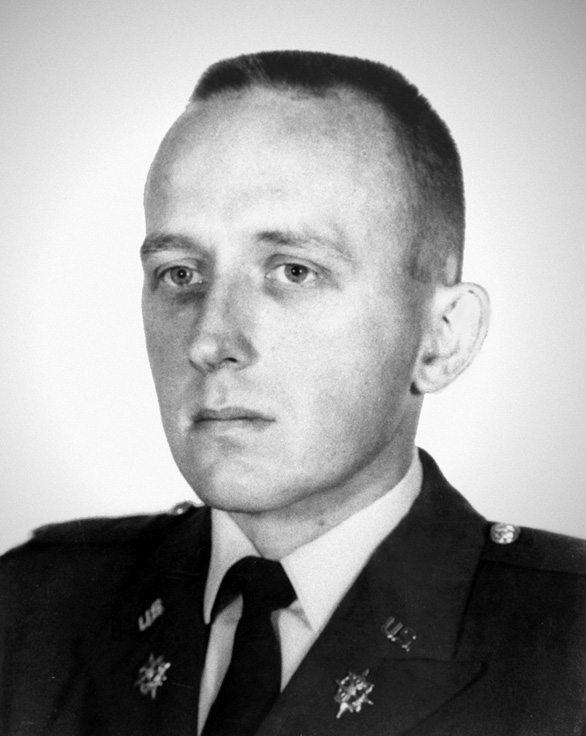
- First Lieutenant George Sisler
- Born: September 19, 1937; Dexter, Missouri, U.S.
- Died: February 7, 1967 (aged 29); Republic of Vietnam
- Burial place: Dexter Cemetery, Dexter, Missouri
- Military career
- Allegiance: United States
- Branch: United States Air Force; United States Army
- Service years: 1958–1962 (Air Force); 1964–1967 (Army)
- Rank: First Lieutenant
- Units: 5th Special Forces Group; MACV-SOG
- Conflicts: Vietnam War †
- Awards: Medal of Honor; Bronze Star; Purple Heart; National Order of Vietnam; Vietanese Gallantry Cross with Palm; Vietnam Campaign Medal

George Kenton Sisler (September 19, 1937 – February 7, 1967) was a United States Army intelligence officer and a recipient of the United States military's highest decoration—the Medal of Honor—for his actions in the Vietnam War.

== Personal life ==
Sisler was the son of Mr. and Mrs. George R. Sisler of Dexter, Missouri. He was married to Jane and had two sons, David and James.

Sisler also worked as an Alaskan smokejumper to fight wildfires in remote parts of the state.

== Education and service ==
Sisler served in the United States Air Force from 1958 to 1962. After attending Arkansas State University and joining the Sigma Pi fraternity, Sisler was commissioned in the Army from his birth city of Dexter, Missouri, in 1964. By February 7, 1967, he was serving as a first lieutenant in the Headquarters and Headquarters Company of the 5th Special Forces Group (Airborne), 1st Special Forces. On that day, when his unit came under heavy enemy attack in the Republic of Vietnam, Sisler organized the defense, rescued a wounded soldier, and single-handedly attacked an enemy position before being mortally wounded. For his actions during the battle, he was awarded the Medal of Honor.

Sisler, aged 29 at his death, was buried at Dexter Cemetery in his hometown of Dexter, Missouri. He was a 1964 graduate of Arkansas State College (now Arkansas State University) with a degree in education. He was a member of the U.S. Army's Military Intelligence Corps.

He was also famous for his toughness, once parachuting despite a broken leg. The ASU ROTC department's Ranger Challenge team is named Sisler's Raiders in his honor.

== Medal of Honor citation ==
First Lieutenant Sisler's official Medal of Honor citation reads:

For conspicuous gallantry and intrepidity at the risk of his life and above and beyond the call of duty. 1st Lt. Sisler was the platoon leader/adviser to a Special United States/Vietnam exploitation force. While on patrol deep within enemy dominated territory, 1st Lt. Sisler's platoon was attacked from 3 sides by a company sized enemy force. 1st Lt. Sisler quickly rallied his men, deployed them to a better defensive position, called for air strikes, and moved among his men to encourage and direct their efforts. Learning that 2 men had been wounded and were unable to pull back to the perimeter, 1st Lt. Sisler charged from the position through intense enemy fire to assist them. He reached the men and began carrying 1 of them back to the perimeter, when he was taken under more intensive weapons fire by the enemy. Laying down his wounded comrade, he killed 3 onrushing enemy soldiers by firing his rifle and silenced the enemy machinegun with a grenade. As he returned the wounded man to the perimeter, the left flank of the position came under extremely heavy attack by the superior enemy force and several additional men of his platoon were quickly wounded. Realizing the need for instant action to prevent his position from being overrun, 1st Lt. Sisler picked up some grenades and charged single-handedly into the enemy onslaught, firing his weapon and throwing grenades. This singularly heroic action broke up the vicious assault and forced the enemy to begin withdrawing. Despite the continuing enemy fire, 1st Lt. Sisler was moving about the battlefield directing air strikes when he fell mortally wounded. His extraordinary leadership, infinite courage, and selfless concern for his men saved the lives of a number of his comrades. His actions reflect great credit upon himself and uphold the highest traditions of the military service.

== Namesake ==
- USNS Sisler (T-AKR-311), a Navy Supply ship, is named after him.
- Sisler Hall, a building at Fort Huachuca, Arizona, is named after him.
- Sisler's Range, a firing range at Arkansas State University
- Sisler's Raiders, the Ranger Challenge team of Arkansas State University

== See also ==
- List of Medal of Honor recipients
- List of Medal of Honor recipients for the Vietnam War
