= Dexter Gymnasium =

- U.S. National Register of Historic Places
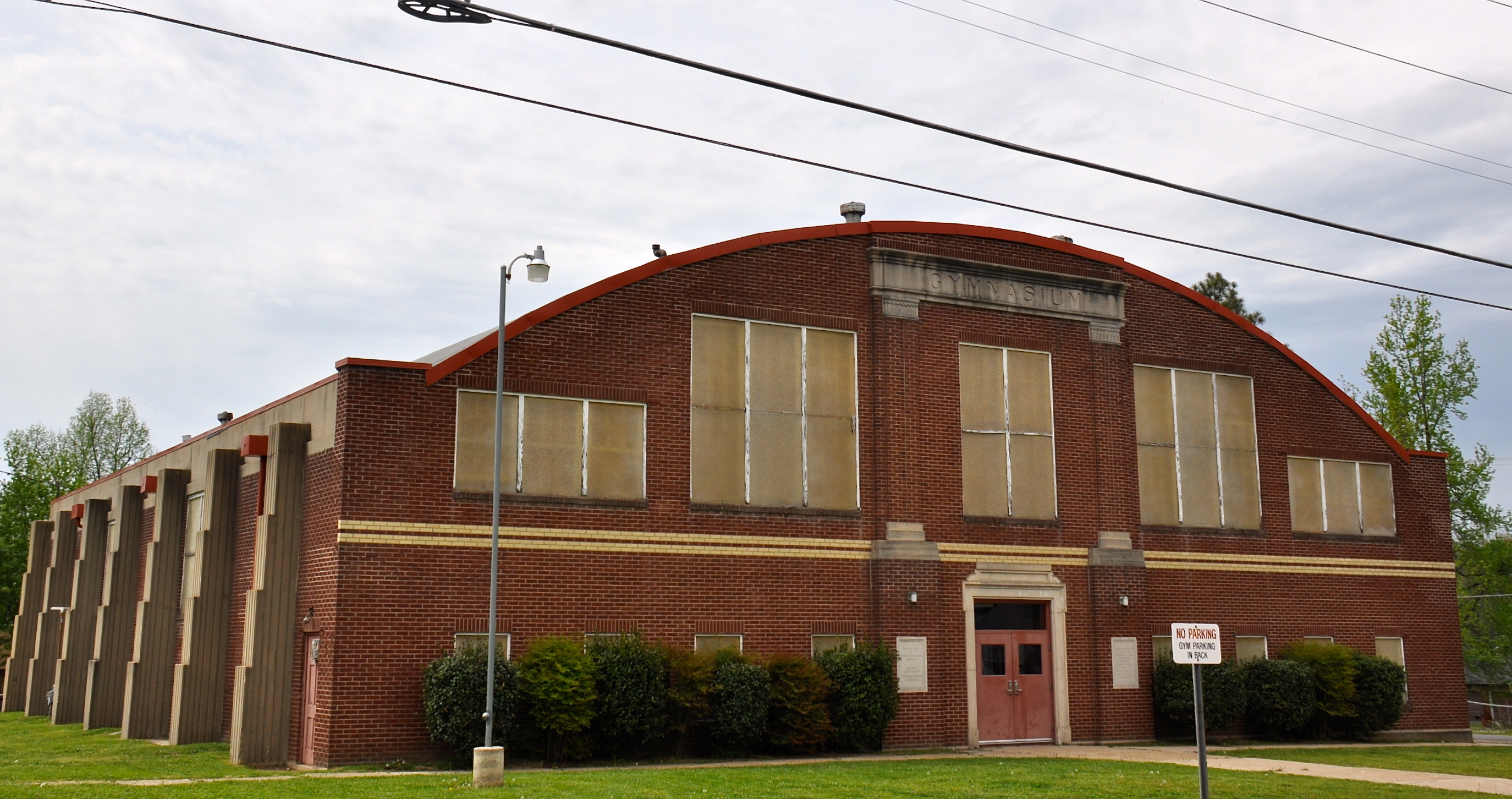
- Dexter Gymnasium, April 2014

- Location within Missouri Location within the United States
- Location: Jct. of Park Lane and Fannetta St., Dexter, Missouri
- Coordinates: 36°47′25″N 89°57′50″W
- Area: less than one acre
- Built: 1939-1940
- Architect: Sutterfield, J.L.
- Architectural style: Art Deco
- NRHP reference No.: 01000839
- Added to NRHP: August 8, 2001

Dexter Gymnasium is a historic gymnasium located at Dexter, Stoddard County, Missouri. It was built in 1939-1940 during the Great Depression on a block donated to the local school system, and shares the block with a school and library. It is a rectangular two-story, Art Deco-style, reinforced concrete and brick building. It measures 88 feet by 96 feet and has a gentle geodesic arch roof. "The fourteen "ziggurat"-styled support columns or buttresses, seven each along the north and south facades, with their incised vertical lines, are an excellent example of this Art Deco style."

The school district built a new gymnasium in 1960, and this building was adapted for community use. In 1996 the school district donated the building and property to the city. It was listed on the National Register of Historic Places in 2001.
