= Judd H. Lyons =

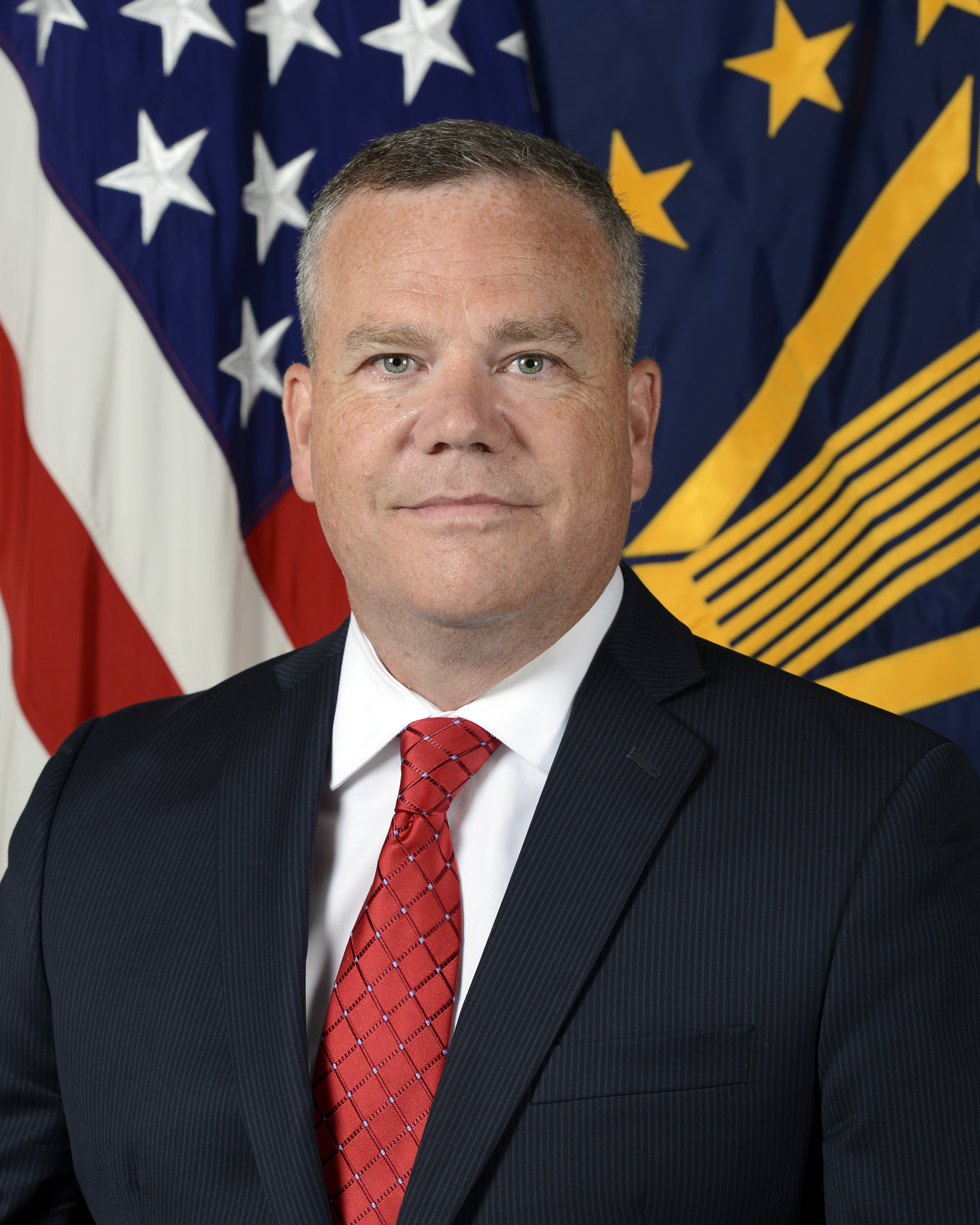

Deputy Assistant Secretary of Defense (Reserve Integration)
- Incumbent
- Assumed office June 26, 2018
- Preceded by: Matthew P. Dubois

Personal details
- Born: May 29, 1962 (age 64) St. Paul, Minnesota
- Spouse: Colonel Amy S. Lyons
- Children: 3
- Education: Bellevue University (BS); United States Army War College (MS)

Military service
- Allegiance: United States
- Branch/service: Army National Guard
- Years of service: 1980–2017
- Rank: Major General
- Commands: Nebraska National Guard; 209th Regional Security Assistance Command-Afghanistan; 92nd Troop Command; Nebraska Army National Guard Training Site
- Battles/wars: War in Afghanistan
- Awards: Army Distinguished Service Medal (3); Legion of Merit; Bronze Star Medal

Judd Henry Lyons (born May 29, 1962) is a retired Army National Guard officer. After retiring from the military the rank of major general, he was appointed to the Senior Executive Service on August 7, 2017. Since 2018, he has served as Deputy Assistant Secretary of Defense (Reserve Integration). In this role, he is the principal advisor to the Assistant Secretary of Defense for Manpower and Reserve Affairs (ASD (M&RA)) in support of the ASD's role of providing overall supervision of manpower and reserve affairs for the Department of Defense. He is responsible for both the integration of reserve affairs across the United States Department of Defense and strategic engagement on all Reserve Component matters.

== Early life and education ==
Lyons was born in Minnesota, on May 29, 1962. In 1980 he graduated from the Missouri Military Academy in Mexico, Missouri, and enlisted in the Nebraska Army National Guard. He received a Bachelor of Professional Studies degree in Human Resources Management from Bellevue University in 1994. In 2005, he graduated from the United States Army War College with a Master of Strategic Studies degree. He is also a graduate of the George C. Marshall Center Senior Executive Seminar and the National and International Security Course of Harvard University's John F. Kennedy School of Government.

Lyons is a graduate of the following military courses: Infantry Officer Basic Course; Armor Officer Advanced Course; Combined Arms and Services Staff School; United States Army Command and General Staff College; Dual Status Joint Task Force Commander Course; Joint and Combined Warfighting School; National Defense University CAPSTONE Course; Army Strategic Leader Basic, Intermediate and Advanced courses; Joint Reserve Component Senior Officer Course; and the Defense Acquisition University's Senior Acquisition Management Course. Lyons was a Level IV Joint Qualified General Officer.

== Military career ==
Lyons received his commission as a second lieutenant of Infantry after completing Officer Candidate School at the Nebraska Military Academy in 1983. He served in various command and staff assignments in Nebraska, and his command positions include: Company D, 1st Battalion, 195th Armor (1989–1990); Nebraska Army National Guard Training Site (2003–2004); and 92nd Troop Command, (2008–2009). He is a veteran of the war on terrorism. From November 2006 to June 2007, Lyons served as Commander of the 209th Regional Security Assistance Command in Afghanistan as part of Combined Joint Task Force Phoenix V.

In 2009, Governor Dave Heineman selected Lyons to serve as adjutant general, succeeding Timothy J. Kadavy, who had been selected to serve as deputy director of the Army National Guard. In May, 2013, Lyons was selected for the position of deputy director of the Army National Guard, again succeeding Kadavy. Lyons was scheduled to assume the deputy director's position on July 13, 2013, and Brigadier General Walter E. Fountain acted as deputy director in the interim. Governor Heineman announced in July, 2013 that he had chosen Brigadier General Daryl L. Bohac, Nebraska's Assistant Adjutant General for Air, to succeed Lyons as Adjutant General.

Lyons began his new duties as deputy director of the Army National Guard on July 13, 2013 and Bohac took over as Adjutant General on July 15. In January, 2014, Lieutenant General William E. Ingram, Jr. retired as Director of the Army National Guard and Lyons was appointed Acting Director, pending the selection of a permanent successor. Kadavy was nominated as Director of the Army National Guard in March 2015, and confirmed by the United States Senate later that month. He assumed his new duties on March 27, and Lyons resumed his duties as deputy director. Lyons received the Distinguished Service Medal for his service as Acting Director and deputy director.

In June 2015, Lyons was assigned to the Joint Staff and detailed to the Department of State with assignment as Military Deputy to the Special Representative for Afghanistan and Pakistan. In this post he provided guidance, advice, and leadership on U.S. security policy and activities throughout South Asia. In May 2017, he was assigned to duty as a special assistant to the Vice Chief of the National Guard Bureau. Lyons retired from the Army National Guard in July 2017.

== Post-military career ==
After retiring from the Army National Guard, on August 7, 2017 Lyons was appointed to the Senior Executive Service as Director of the Defense Personnel and Family Support Center. Lyons' responsibilities included liaising with the Reserve Forces Policy Board, the Reserve Component Chiefs, and state Governors as well as exercising primary responsibility for unique Reserve Component programs to include the DoD STARBASE program, National Guard Youth Challenge, international Reserve Component programs, and Innovative Readiness Training. He also provided policy oversight and guidance to the missions of the Defense Personnel and Family Support Center (DPFSC).

On June 26, 2018 Lyons began an assignment as Acting Deputy Assistant Secretary of Defense (Reserve Integration) in the office of the Under Secretary of Defense for Personnel and Readiness. He was officially appointed to the position on February 17, 2019. As Deputy Assistant Secretary, Lyons is responsible to provide supervision of Department of Defense manpower policies and programs and integration of reserve affairs with active duty.

== Family ==
Lyons currently resides in Alexandria, Virginia. His spouse, Amy, is a retired Army National Guard Judge Advocate General's Corps officer and attained the rank of colonel. The Lyons are the parents of three children; Alex Baldwin, Ben, and Sam. As of 2013, Alex was a commissioned officer in the Wisconsin Army National Guard and Ben was a noncommissioned officer in the Nebraska Army National Guard.

== Military awards ==
Army Distinguished Service Medal with two bronze oak leaf clusters
Legion of Merit
Bronze Star Medal
Meritorious Service Medal with four oak leaf clusters
Army Commendation Medal with silver oak leaf cluster
Army Achievement Medal with oak leaf cluster
Joint Meritorious Unit Award
Army Superior Unit Award
Army Reserve Components Achievement Medal with silver and bronze oak leaf clusters
National Defense Service Medal with one bronze service star
Afghanistan Campaign Medal with one campaign star
Global War on Terrorism Service Medal
Humanitarian Service Medal
Armed Forces Reserve Medal with Gold Hourglass and "M" Device
Army Service Ribbon
Army Overseas Service Ribbon
NATO Medal for the former Yugoslavia
Nebraska Legion of Merit
Nebraska National Guard Meritorious Service Medal with two oak leaf clusters
Nebraska National Guard Commendation Medal with oak leaf cluster
Nebraska National Guard Individual Achievement Medal
Nebraska National Guard Homeland Defense Service Ribbon with "M" Device
Nebraska National Guard Service Medal with 3 "X" Devices
Nebraska National Guard Emergency Service Medal with service star
Louisiana National Guard Emergency Service Medal

== Military assignments ==
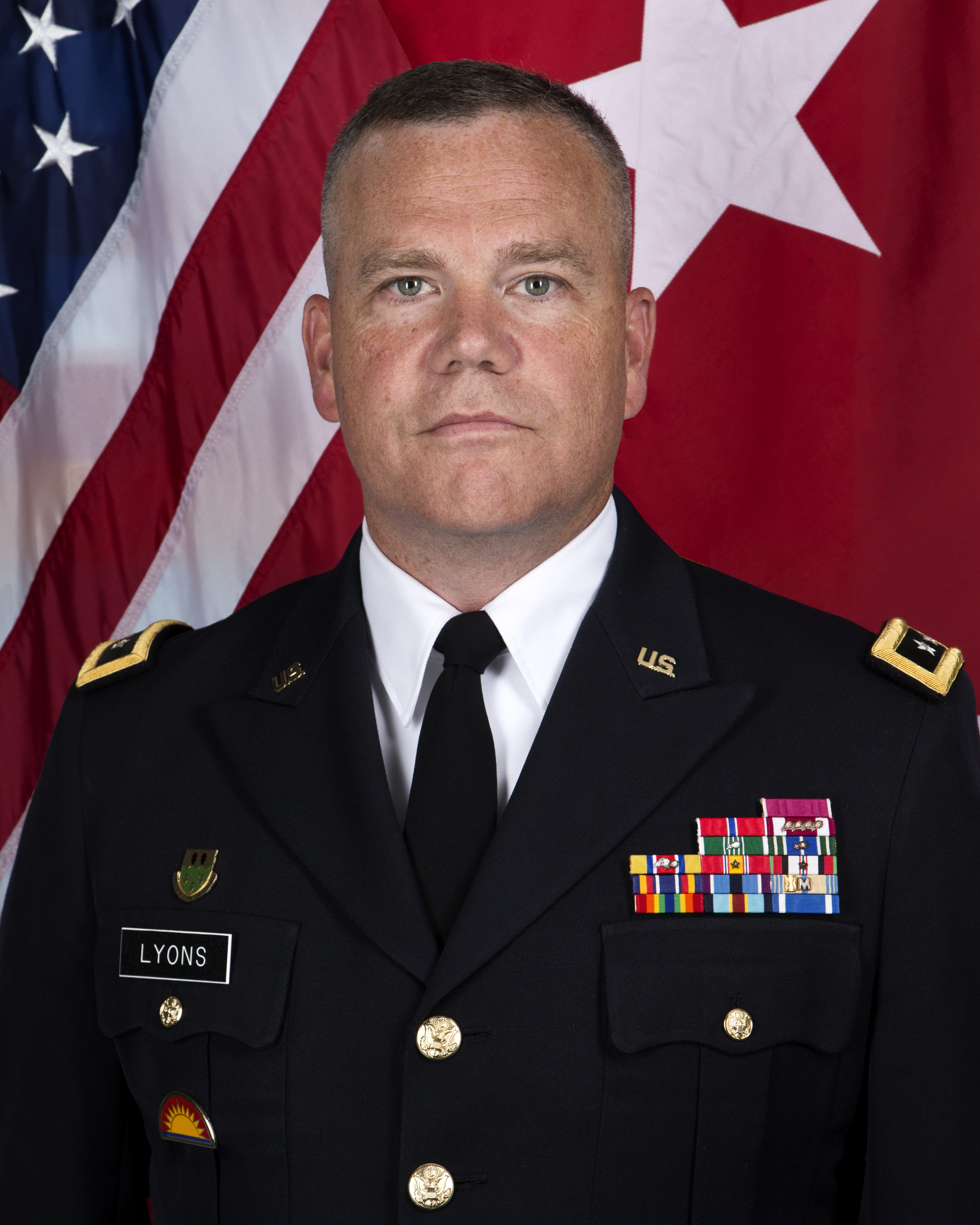
Maj. Gen. Judd H. Lyons, during his time at the U.S. Department of State.

1. May 1983 – October 1984, Battalion Assistant S3/Chemical Officer, Headquarters Company, 1st Battalion (Mechanized), 134th Infantry, Omaha, Nebraska
2. October 1984 – October 1985, Anti-Armor Platoon Leader, Combat Support Company, 1st Battalion (Mechanized), 134th Infantry, Wahoo, Nebraska
3. October 1985 – October 1987, Tank Platoon Leader, Company D, 1st Battalion, 195th Armor, Wahoo, Nebraska
4. October 1987 – February 1988, Battalion Support Platoon Leader, Headquarters Company, 1st Battalion, 134th Infantry (Mechanized), Omaha, Nebraska
5. February 1988 – March 1989, Company Executive Officer, Headquarters Company, 1st Battalion, 134th Infantry (Mechanized), Omaha, Nebraska
6. March 1989 – March 1990, Commander, Company D, 1st Battalion, 195th Armor, Wahoo, Nebraska
7. March 1990 – August 1990, Communications and Electronics Officer, Headquarters Company, 2nd Battalion, 134th Infantry, Lincoln, Nebraska
8. August 1990 – January 1991, Battalion S-2, Headquarters Company, 2nd Battalion, 134th Infantry, Lincoln, Nebraska
9. January 1991 – September 1992, Operations and Training Officer, Headquarters, State Area Command, Lincoln, Nebraska
10. September 1992 – February 1995, Operations and Training Officer, 92nd Troop Command, Lincoln, Nebraska
11. February 1995 – August 1998, Executive Officer, Headquarters Troop, 1st Squadron, 167th Cavalry, Lincoln, Nebraska
12. August 1998 – June 1999, Mobilization Planner, Headquarters, State Area Command, Lincoln, Nebraska
13. June 1999 – April 2002, Recruiting and Retention Manager, Headquarters, State Area Command, Lincoln, Nebraska
14. April 2002 – September 2003, Executive Officer, 92nd Troop Command, Lincoln, Nebraska
15. September 2003 – December 2004, Commander, Training Site, Detachment 4, Headquarters, State Area Command, Ashland, Nebraska
16. December 2004 – September 2005, J1/Human Resource Officer (HRO), Headquarters, State Area Command, Lincoln, Nebraska
17. September 2005 – October 2006, J3/Deputy Chief of Staff for Operations (DCSOPS), Joint Force Headquarters, Lincoln, Nebraska
18. November 2006 – June 2007, commander, 209th Regional Security Assistance Command, Combined Joint Task Force Phoenix V, Afghanistan
19. June 2007 – April 2008, J3/Deputy Chief of Staff for Operations, Nebraska Joint Force Headquarters, Lincoln, Nebraska
20. April 2008 – August 2009, commander, 92nd Troop Command, Lincoln, Nebraska
21. June 2009 – August 2009, chief joint staff, Joint Force Headquarters, Lincoln, Nebraska
22. August 2009 – July 2013, adjutant general, Nebraska National Guard, Lincoln, Nebraska
23. August 2013 – June 2015, deputy director, Army National Guard, Arlington, Virginia
24. January 2014 – March 2015, acting director of the Army National Guard, Arlington, Virginia
25. June 2015 – May 2017, military deputy to the Special Representative for Afghanistan and Pakistan, United States Department of State, Washington, District of Columbia
26. May 2017 – July 2017, special assistant to the vice chief, National Guard Bureau, Washington, D.C.
27. July 2017, retired

== Dates of rank ==
- Major General – September 22, 2012
- Brigadier General – December 22, 2010
- Colonel – December 10, 2004
- Lieutenant Colonel – August 30, 1999
- Major – April 28, 1993
- Captain – April 28, 1989
- First Lieutenant – May 21, 1986
- Second Lieutenant – May 22, 1983

Military offices
Preceded by Timothy J. Kadavy	Adjutant General of Nebraska; 2009–2013	Succeeded by Daryl Bohac
Preceded by Walter E. Fountain; Acting	Deputy Director of the Army National Guard; 2013–2015	Succeeded by Walter E. Fountain; Acting
Preceded by William E. Ingram, Jr.	Director of the Army National Guard; Acting; 2014–2015	Succeeded by Timothy J. Kadavy
