= Dexter, Missouri =

City in Stoddard County, Missouri, United States

- City
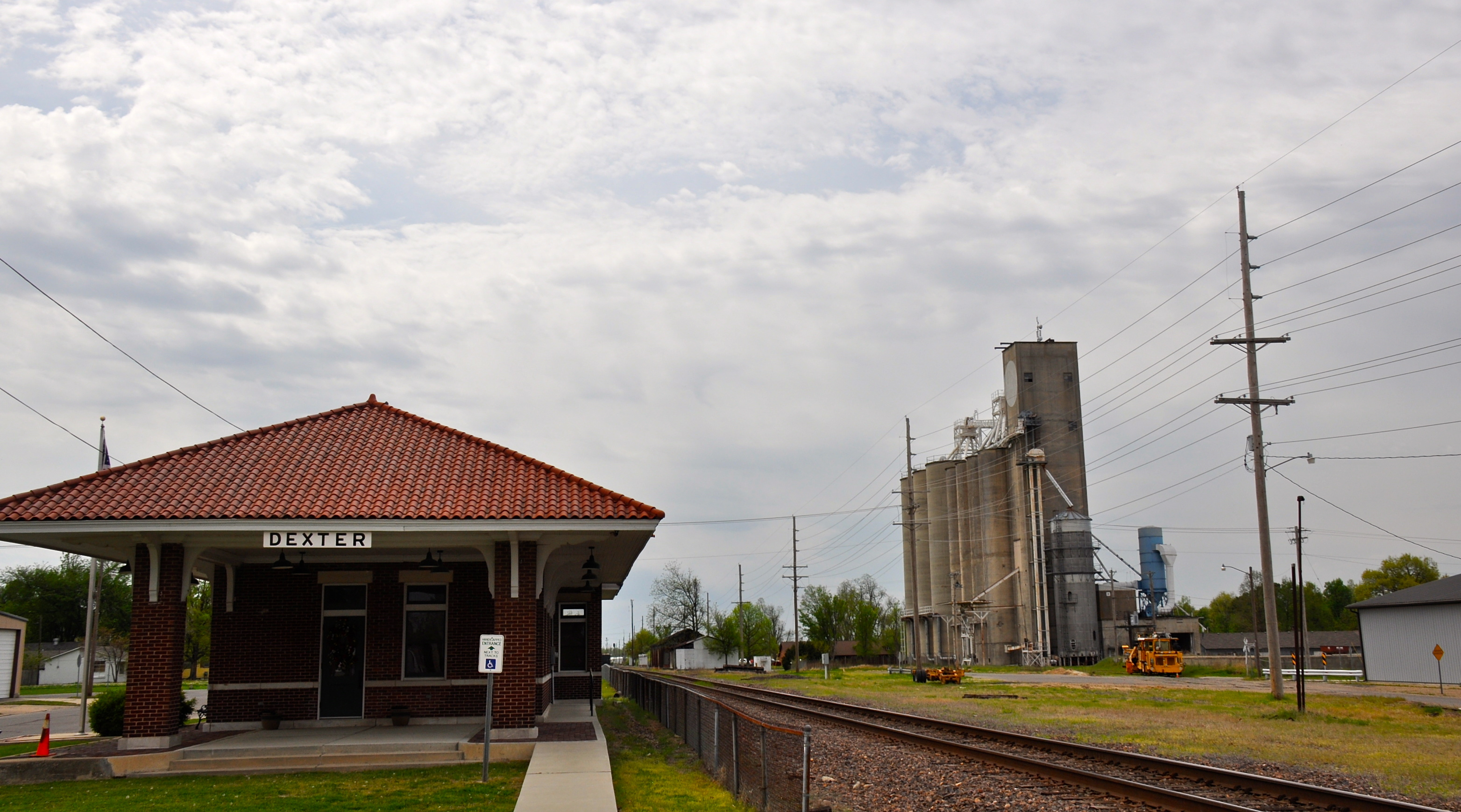
- Visitor center and grain towers along the railroad tracks

- Location of Dexter, Missouri
- Coordinates: 36°47′34″N 89°57′48″W
- Country: United States
- State: Missouri
- County: Stoddard

Government
  - Mayor: Mark Snider

Area
  - Total: 7.34 sq mi (19.01 km^{2})
  - Land: 7.21 sq mi (18.67 km^{2})
  - Water: 0.13 sq mi (0.34 km^{2})
- Elevation: 390 ft (120 m)

Population (2020)
  - Total: 7,927
  - Density: 1,099.7/sq mi (424.61/km^{2})
- Time zone: UTC-6 (Central (CST))
  - Summer (DST): UTC-5 (CDT)
- ZIP code: 63841
- Area code: 573
- FIPS code: 29-19396
- GNIS feature ID: 2394530
- Website: www.cityofdexter.org

Dexter is a city in Stoddard County, Missouri, United States, founded in 1873. The population was 7,927 at the 2020 census.

== History ==
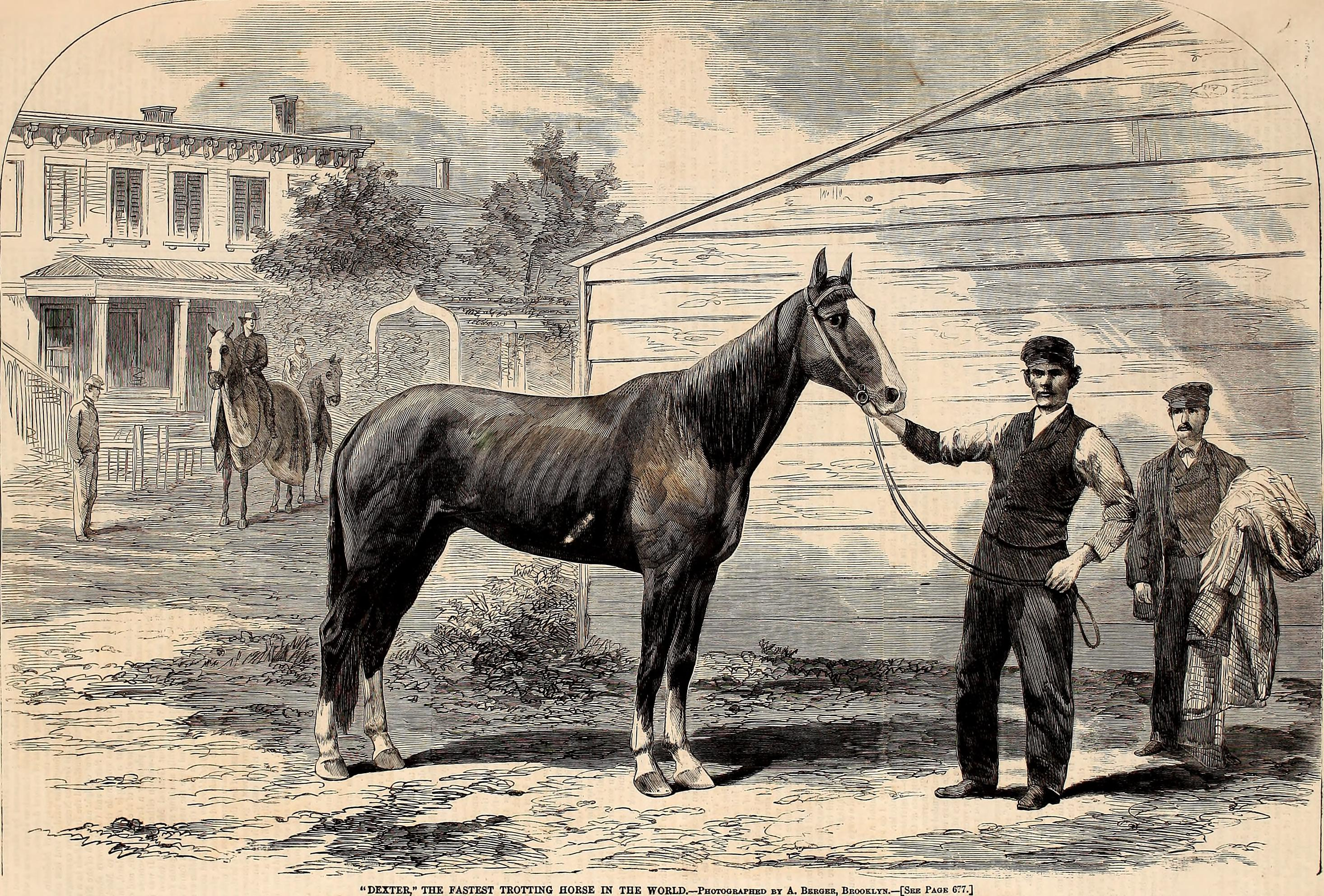
Dexter the fastest trotting horse in the world

Dexter was platted in 1873. Mr. Dex, an early settler, gave the community the name of his horse, Dexter. Dexter experienced rapid growth with the arrival of the St. Louis, Iron Mountain and Southern Railway. A post office called Dexter City was established in 1873, and the name was changed to Dexter in 1887.

The Dexter Gymnasium was listed on the National Register of Historic Places in 2001.

On July 10, 2021, an EF2 tornado hit the town with at least 150 homes reported damaged.

== Geography ==
Dexter is located 19 miles (31 km) southwest of Sikeston. Dexter is located on what is known as Crowley's Ridge. It is at the intersection of U.S. Route 60 and Missouri Route 25.

According to the United States Census Bureau, the city has a total area of 6.65 square miles (17.22 km^{2}), of which 6.52 square miles (16.89 km^{2}) is land and 0.13 square miles (0.34 km^{2}) is water.

== Demographics ==
Historical population
Census	Pop.	Note	%±
1880	489		—
1890	792		62.0%
1900	1,862		135.1%
1910	2,322		24.7%
1920	2,635		13.5%
1930	2,714		3.0%
1940	3,108		14.5%
1950	4,624		48.8%
1960	5,519		19.4%
1970	6,024		9.2%
1980	7,043		16.9%
1990	7,559		7.3%
2000	7,356		−2.7%
2010	7,864		6.9%
2020	7,927		0.8%
U.S. Decennial Census

=== 2020 census ===
As of the 2020 census, Dexter had a population of 7,927. The median age was 39.9 years. 22.2% of residents were under the age of 18 and 20.3% of residents were 65 years of age or older. For every 100 females there were 89.3 males, and for every 100 females age 18 and over there were 84.7 males age 18 and over.

99.6% of residents lived in urban areas, while 0.4% lived in rural areas.

There were 3,467 households in Dexter, of which 26.5% had children under the age of 18 living in them. Of all households, 37.4% were married-couple households, 19.3% were households with a male householder and no spouse or partner present, and 34.9% were households with a female householder and no spouse or partner present. About 35.9% of all households were made up of individuals and 16.3% had someone living alone who was 65 years of age or older.

There were 3,888 housing units, of which 10.8% were vacant. The homeowner vacancy rate was 3.1% and the rental vacancy rate was 9.8%.

Racial composition as of the 2020 census
Race	Number	Percent
White	7,326	92.4%
Black or African American	90	1.1%
American Indian and Alaska Native	32	0.4%
Asian	47	0.6%
Native Hawaiian and Other Pacific Islander	0	0.0%
Some other race	75	0.9%
Two or more races	357	4.5%
Hispanic or Latino (of any race)	251	3.2%

=== Demographic estimates ===
Census Bureau profile estimates report a median household income of $47,647, with 23.8% of residents in poverty. The same profile reports that 17.1% of residents had a bachelor's degree or higher and 45.5% had completed high school or equivalent.

The profile also reports an average family size of 3.12, with 32.6% of residents never married. An estimated 56.4% of residents owned their homes, the median gross rent was $717, the employment rate was 51.2%, and 13.2% of the population were veterans.

=== 2010 census ===
As of the census of 2010, there were 7,865 people, 3,359 households, and 2,108 families living in the city. The population density was 1,206.1 inhabitants per square mile (465.7/km^{2}). There were 3,666 housing units at an average density of 562.3 per square mile (217.1/km^{2}). The racial makeup of the city was 97.1% White, 0.5% African American, 0.5% Native American, 0.2% Asian, 0.2% from other races, and 1.4% from two or more races. Hispanic or Latino of any race were 1.9% of the population.

There were 3,359 households, of which 30.8% had children under the age of 18 living with them, 43.8% were married couples living together, 14.3% had a female householder with no husband present, 4.6% had a male householder with no wife present, and 37.2% were non-families. 32.5% of all households were made up of individuals, and 14.4% had someone living alone who was 65 years of age or older. The average household size was 2.28 and the average family size was 2.83.

The median age in the city was 40.5 years. 22.9% of residents were under the age of 18; 8.3% were between the ages of 18 and 24; 24.4% were from 25 to 44; 24.8% were from 45 to 64; and 19.8% were 65 years of age or older. The gender makeup of the city was 45.6% male and 54.4% female.

=== 2000 census ===
As of the census of 2000, there were 7,356 people, 3,237 households, and 2,019 families living in the city. The population density was 1,208.0 inhabitants per square mile (466.4/km^{2}). There were 3,560 housing units at an average density of 584.6 per square mile (225.7/km^{2}). The racial makeup of the city was 97.31% White, 0.15% African American, 0.46% Native American, 0.18% Asian, 0.50% from other races, and 1.40% from two or more races. Hispanic or Latino of any race were 1.20% of the population.

There were 3,237 households, out of which 29.4% had children under the age of 18 living with them, 47.0% were married couples living together, 12.1% had a female householder with no husband present, and 37.6% were non-families. 33.8% of all households were made up of individuals, and 17.7% had someone living alone who was 65 years of age or older. The average household size was 2.23 and the average family size was 2.83.

In the city the population was spread out, with 23.7% under the age of 18, 9.2% from 18 to 24, 25.9% from 25 to 44, 20.9% from 45 to 64, and 20.3% who were 65 years of age or older. The median age was 39 years. For every 100 females there were 82.2 males. For every 100 females age 18 and over, there were 77.3 males.

The median income for a household in the city was $23,116, and the median income for a family was $32,175. Males had a median income of $26,724 versus $17,409 for females. The per capita income for the city was $15,034. About 14.8% of families and 18.3% of the population were below the poverty line, including 23.5% of those under age 18 and 16.3% of those age 65 or over.

== Climate ==
Dexter has a humid subtropical climate (Köppen climate classification Cfa).

Climate data for Dexter
Month	Jan	Feb	Mar	Apr	May	Jun	Jul	Aug	Sep	Oct	Nov	Dec	Year
Mean daily maximum °F (°C)	43 (6)	50 (10)	60 (16)	71 (22)	80 (27)	89 (32)	92 (33)	90 (32)	83 (28)	73 (23)	58 (14)	47 (8)	70 (21)
Mean daily minimum °F (°C)	26 (−3)	31 (−1)	39 (4)	48 (9)	58 (14)	66 (19)	70 (21)	68 (20)	60 (16)	49 (9)	39 (4)	30 (−1)	49 (9)
Average precipitation inches (mm)	3.47 (88)	3.64 (92)	4.89 (124)	4.27 (108)	4.86 (123)	4.21 (107)	3.81 (97)	3.22 (82)	3.07 (78)	3.08 (78)	4.56 (116)	4.83 (123)	47.91 (1,217)

== Education ==
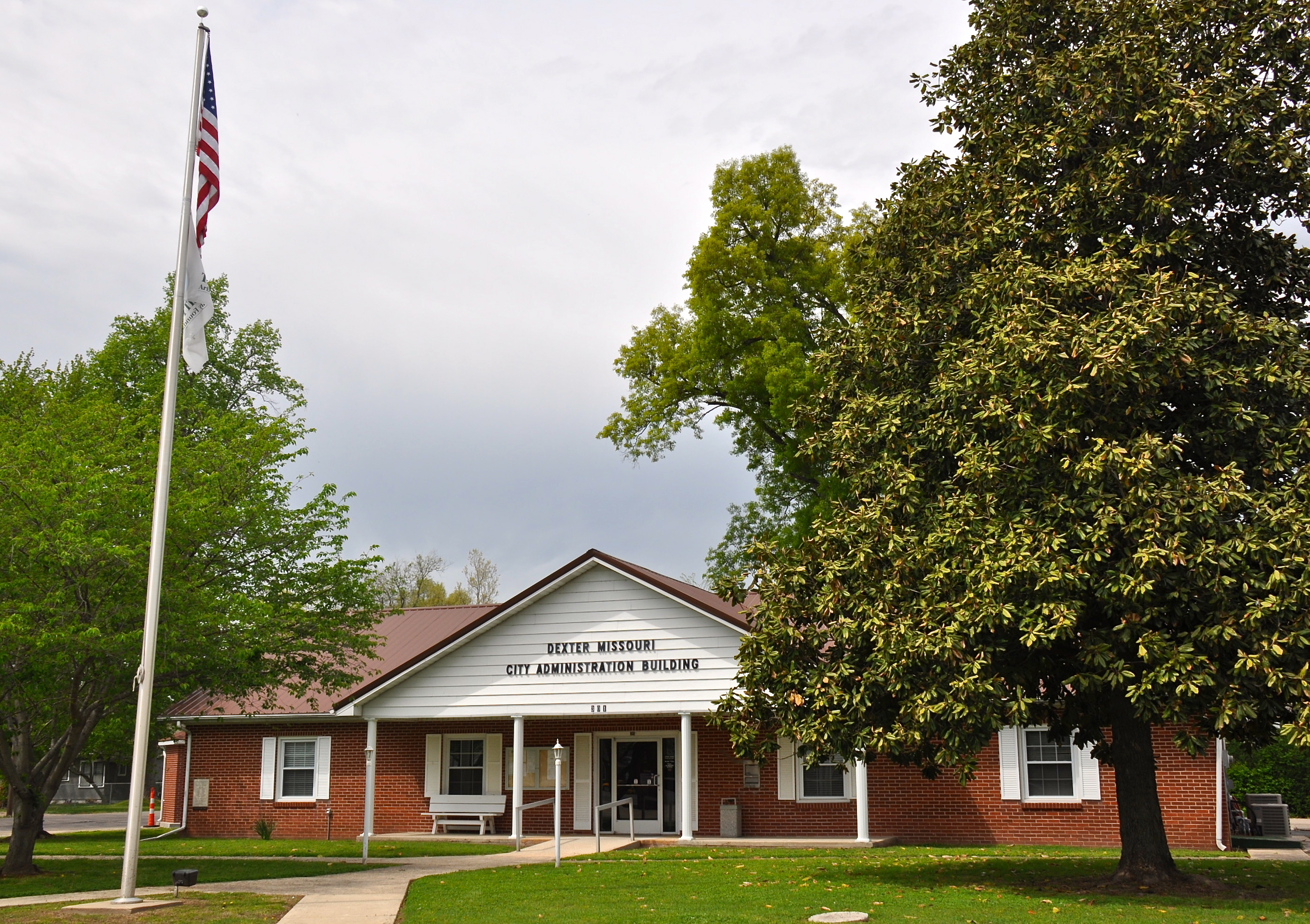
Dexter City Administration Building, April 2014.

Dexter R-XI School District operates all of Dexter's public schools, which includes Southwest and Central Elementary, T.S. Hill Middle School, and Dexter Senior High School. There are currently 2,076 students attending as of the 2023-2024 school year.

The town has a lending library, the Keller Public Library. The library was dedicated to Dexter native, Edward Keller, in 1998. In 2002, a statue honoring the Medal of Honor recipient Lt. George K. Sisler was placed in front of the Keller Public Library.

== Notable people ==
- Clarence Paul Oliver (1898–1991), geneticist
- George K. Sisler, Medal of Honor recipient
- Clyde A. Vaughn, United States Army Lieutenant General and Director of the Army National Guard
- James P. Walker, politician. member of the House of Representatives.
- Max West, baseball player, member of Pacific Coast League Hall of Fame
- Orville Zimmerman, United States Representative for Missouri's 10th congressional district, was principal of Dexter High School, 1904-1909
- Patti McGuire, model, Playboy Playmate November 1976

== See also ==
- List of cities in Missouri
