= Roger P. Lempke =

United States Air Force general

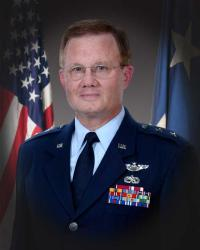
- Major General Roger P. Lempke
- Military career
- Allegiance: United States of America
- Branch: Air National Guard
- Service years: 1969–2007
- Rank: Major General
- Commands: Adjutant General, Nebraska National Guard
- Awards: Legion of Merit

Major General Roger Philip Lempke is a retired United States Air Force officer and was the adjutant general (TAG) of the Nebraska National Guard. The Nebraska Adjutant General commands the state military forces and also directs the Nebraska Emergency Management Agency (NEMA).

The Army National Guard in Nebraska consists of over 4,000 soldiers in 74 troop units in 28 communities throughout the state. The Nebraska Air National Guard, which is based in Lincoln, flies the KC-135R aircraft, and has unit strength of approximately 940 airmen.

Approximately 30 NEMA personnel coordinate state and federal emergency planning and disaster recovery and assist local governments with training and education programs. Lempke retired effective September 2007, and was succeeded by Timothy J. Kadavy.

== Background ==
After graduating from the United States Air Force Academy in 1969, Lempke become a pilot and flew T-41C, T-37, and T-38 aircraft, accumulating more than 1600 flying hours and senior pilot status. Selected to attend the Air Force Institute of Technology in 1975 he graduated with honors in 1976 with a Master of Science degree in logistics management. Lempke served in the B-1 and B-52 Offensive Avionics System Program Offices until separating from the Air Force in 1979. After a short stint in the Air Force Reserve at Offutt AFB he joined the Nebraska Air National Guard as a traditional guardsman in 1984.

After attending Maintenance Officer School in 1987 he served in various maintenance officer positions. This included leading a maintenance team that won the Reconnaissance Air Meet (RAM) Maintenance Trophy in 1988. He became the consolidated aircraft maintenance squadron (CAMRON) commander in 1991. In 1996, he was nominated for the rank of colonel and assigned to lead the 155th Logistics Group. On the civilian side Lempke rose to vice president in charge of manufacturing, purchasing, and data resources for a company in Lincoln that manufactures high-technology pressure vessels for the aerospace and defense industries.

Since retiring from military service, Lempke became the director of military affairs for United States Senator Mike Johanns of Nebraska through December 2013.

In January 2014, he was named director of military affair for United States Senator Deb Fischer (R-NE), following the announced retirement of Senator Mike Johanns of Nebraska. Lempke is also a member of Pi Kappa Alpha fraternity.

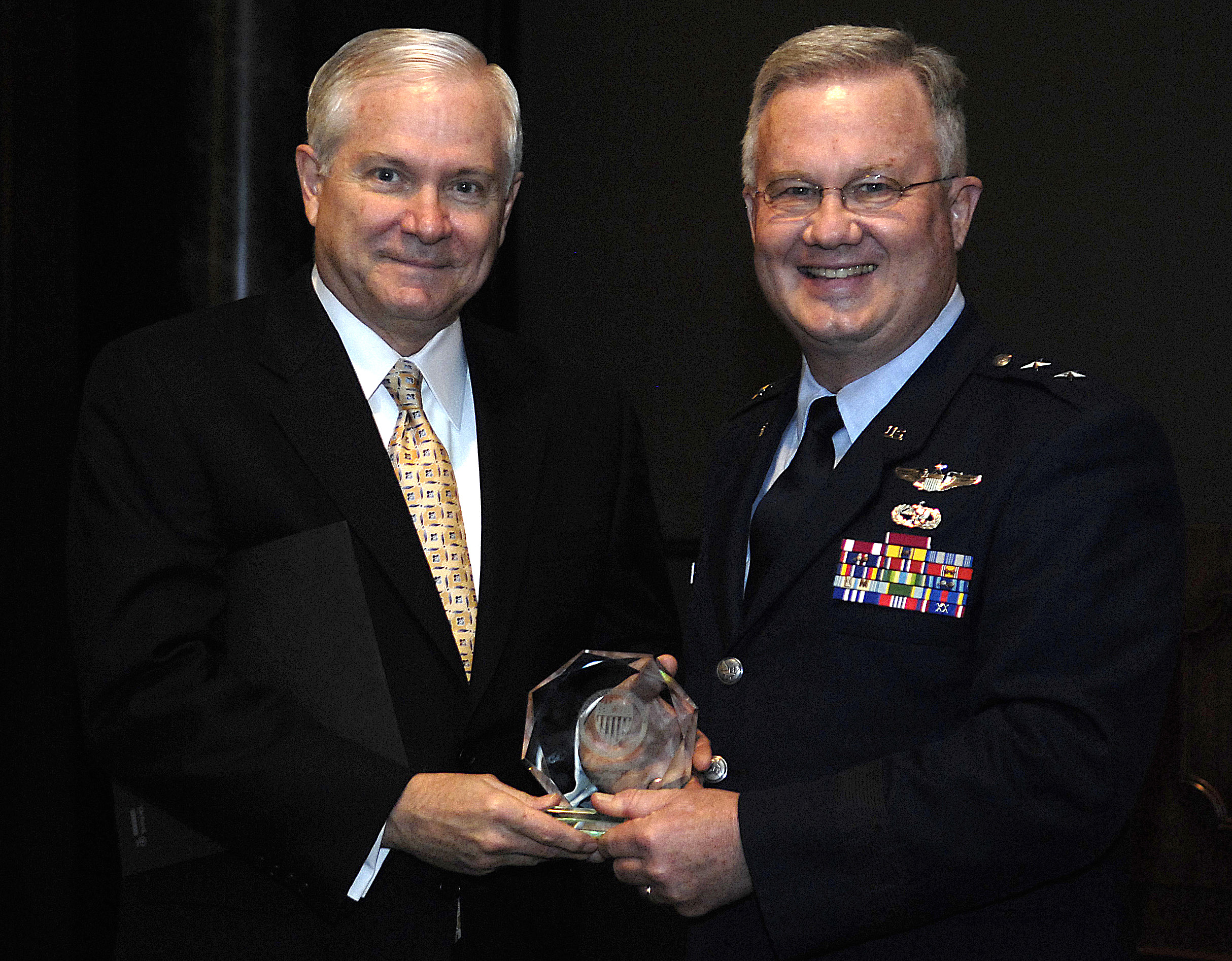
Lempke with Bob Gates

== Education ==
- 1969 Bachelor of Science in aeronautical engineering, United States Air Force Academy, CO
- 1973 Squadron Officer School (top third graduate), Maxwell Air Force Base, AL
- 1976 Master of Science in logistics management (distinguished graduate), Air Force Institute of Technology, Wright-Patterson AFB, OH
- 1987 Aircraft Maintenance Officer School, Chanute AFB, IL
- 1991 Air Command & Staff College by correspondence
- 1995 Air War College by correspondence

== Assignments ==
1. July 1969–August 1970, student pilot, 3561st Student Squadron, Webb Air Force Base, TX
2. September 1970–December 1970, instructor pilot student, 3251st FTS, Perrin AFB, TX
3. December 1970–May 1973, T-41 instructor pilot, 3253rd Pilot Training Squadron, Peterson Field, CO
4. June 1973–January 1975, T-37 instructor pilot, 37th Flying Training Squadron, Columbus AFB, MS
5. January 1975–May 1975, Chief, T-37 Academics Training, 14th Student Squadron., Columbus AFB, MS
6. June 1975–June 1976, student, Air Force Institute of Technology, Wright-Patterson AFB, OH
7. July 1976–February 1978, B-1 support equipment manager, DET 15 OCALC [attached to the B-1 System Program Office], Wright-Patterson AFB, OH
8. February 1978–June 1979, support equipment acquisition integration manager, HQ Air Force Air Logistics Division (AFALD), Wright-Patterson AFB, OH
9. July 1979–August 1984, individual mobilization augmentee, HQ Strategic Air Command (SAC), Offutt AFB, NE
10. September 1984–February 1987, OIC, administration, 155th Consolidated Aircraft Maintenance Squadron (155 CAMS) (RF-4C), Lincoln MAP/ANGB, NE
11. February 1987–June 1989, OIC, organizational maintenance, 155 CAMS, Lincoln MAP/ANGB, NE
12. June 1989–August 1991, OIC, maintenance control, 155 CAMS, Lincoln MAP/ANGB, NE
13. September 1991–September 1994, commander, 155th CAMS (RF-4C), Lincoln MAP/ANGB, NE
14. October 1994–June 1996, commander, 155th Maintenance Squadron (155 MXS) (KC-135R), Lincoln MAP/ANGB, NE
15. June 1996–March 1999, commander, 155th Logistics Group (155 LG) (KC-135R), Lincoln MAP/ANGB, NE
16. December 2000-September 2007, The Adjutant General of Nebraska

== Flight information ==
- Rating: Senior pilot
- Flight hours: More than 1600, primarily as an instructor pilot
- Aircraft flown: T-41C, T-37, and T-38

== Major awards and decorations ==
- Legion of Merit
- Meritorious Service Medal
- Air Force Commendation Medal with one device
- Air Force Achievement Medal
- Air Force Outstanding Unit Award with six devices
- Air Force Organizational Excellence Award
- National Defense Service Medal with two bronze stars
- Armed Forces Service Medal
- Air Force Longevity Service Award with six oak leaf clusters
- Armed Forces Reserve Medal with twenty-year device and M device
- Air Force Marksmanship Ribbon
- Nebraska National Guard Commendation Medal
- Nebraska National Guard National Defense Service Medal
- Nebraska National Guard Service Medal with fifteen-year device

== Effective dates of promotion ==
- Second lieutenant: 4 June 1969
- First lieutenant: 4 December 1970
- Captain: 4 June 1972
- Major: 18 October 1984
- Lieutenant colonel: 2 September 1991
- Colonel: 22 June 1996
- Brigadier general (NE): 2 December 2000
  - Federally recognized as a brigadier general, USAF (Air Reserve Component)
- Major general (NE): 3 October 2001
  - Federally recognized as a major general, USAF (Air Reserve Component)
- Lieutenant general (NE): 3 November 2007
  - Honorary promotion in the military forces of the State of Nebraska, post-retirement; not federally recognized as a lieutenant general in USAF.
    - Air National Guard officers are limited to federal recognition no higher than major general unless assigned to the 3-star positions of director, Air National Guard (national level); deputy commander, U.S. Northern Command (USNORTHCOM); vice chief, National Guard Bureau; or en route to the 4-star position as chief, National Guard Bureau.
