= William E. Ingram Jr. =

United States general

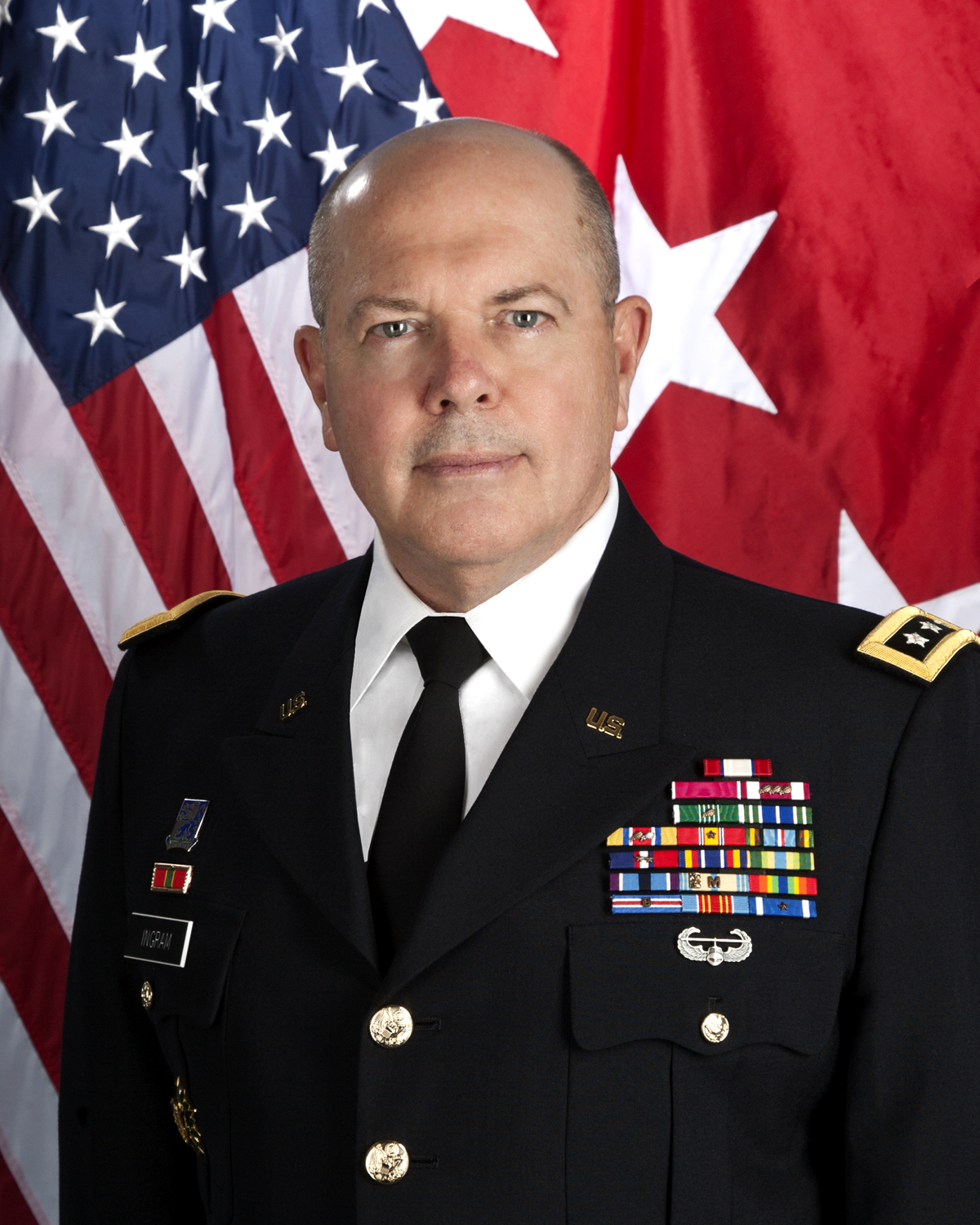
- Born: January 21, 1948 (age 78); Elizabeth City, North Carolina
- Military career
- Allegiance: United States
- Branch: United States Army
- Service years: 1970–2014
- Rank: Lieutenant general
- Commands: Army National Guard; North Carolina National Guard; 60th Troop Command; Task Force Sabre; Task Force Pershing; 139th Support Detachment; 1st Battalion, 119th Infantry
- Awards: Army Distinguished Service Medal (2); Legion of Merit

Lieutenant General William E. Ingram Jr. (born January 21, 1948) is a retired United States Army officer who served as the director of the Army National Guard. He was the 20th individual and the third three-star general to lead the Army National Guard since 1948, when the office was established as Chief, Army Division, National Guard Bureau. In this assignment Ingram guided the formulation, development and implementation of all programs and policies affecting the Army National Guard, a force of more than 350,000 citizen soldiers in the 50 states, three territories and the District of Columbia.

Ingram assumed the position and was promoted to lieutenant general on November 28, 2011, in a ceremony held at the Pentagon, which was presided over by Army Chief of Staff Raymond T. Odierno and National Guard Bureau Chief Craig R. McKinley. He retired in a ceremony presided over by Frank J. Grass at Joint Base Myer–Henderson Hall on January 14, 2014.

== Military career ==
William Emmett Ingram Jr. was born in Elizabeth City, North Carolina, on January 21, 1948. He enlisted as an Infantryman in the North Carolina Army National Guard in 1970 and received his commission in 1972 as a Distinguished Graduate of the North Carolina Military Academy's Officer Candidate School.

During his career, Ingram advanced through staff and command positions of increasing rank and responsibility, including commander of 1st Battalion 119th Infantry and commander of the 139th Support Detachment.

In 1997 Ingram deployed to the Balkans as commander of Task Force Pershing, based at Camp Sava North, Slavonski Brod, Croatia. He then commanded the 60th Troop Command in Rocky Mount, North Carolina, before returning to the Balkans in 1999 to serve as Chief of Staff, United Nations Preventative Deployment (UNPREDEP), Skopje, Macedonia and commander, Task Force Sabre, Camp Able Sentry, Petrovec, Macedonia.

=== General officer ===
In July 2001, Ingram was appointed Adjutant General of North Carolina, where he oversaw the largest mobilization of the North Carolina National Guard since World War II. While serving as the adjutant general, he also served as a member and subsequently as chairman of the Army Reserve Forces Policy Committee.

In October 2010, he was called to the Pentagon to serve as special assistant to the Army's Vice Chief of Staff. He served in this assignment until his November, 2011 appointment to succeed Raymond W. Carpenter as Director of the Army National Guard.

He retired in January, 2014, and was followed by Major General Judd H. Lyons, the deputy director, who was appointed acting director pending the selection of a permanent successor. Ingram received a second award of the Army Distinguished Service Medal at his retirement ceremony.

== Civilian career ==
In civilian life, from 1975 to 1988 Ingram was General Manager, Corporate Secretary and Treasurer of N.C. Green Oil Company, a petroleum marketing firm in Williamston. He is a past director of the North Carolina Petroleum Marketers Association and the Williamston Rotary Club as well as a past director of the Martin County Chamber of Commerce and the Martin County Bureau of Travel and Tourism. General Ingram was also a director of Martin County's Committee of 100, an organization involved in local economic development efforts.

== Family ==
Ingram is a native of coastal North Carolina. His wife Lil and he have three adult children and two granddaughters. General Ingram's father, Major General William E. Ingram Sr., served as Adjutant General of North Carolina from 1977 To 1983.

== Education ==
- 1970 North Carolina State University, Bachelor of Science, Textile Chemistry, Raleigh, North Carolina
- 1972 Infantry Officer Basic Course, Fort Benning, Georgia
- 1978 Infantry Officer Advanced Course, Fort Benning, Georgia
- 1982 Command and General Staff Officer Course, United States Army Command and General Staff College, by correspondence
- 1983 United States Air Force Joint Firepower Control Course, United States Air Force Ground Operations School, Hurlburt Field, Florida
- 1988 Terrorism in Low Intensity Conflict Course, John F. Kennedy Special Warfare Center and School, Fort Bragg, North Carolina
- 1993 Reserve Components National Security Course, National Defense University, Naval Air Station Pensacola, Pensacola, Florida
- 1997 United States Army War College, by correspondence
- 2002 Black Sea Security Program, John F. Kennedy School of Government, Harvard University, Cambridge, Massachusetts
- 2007 Executive Course on National and International Security, George Washington University, Washington, D.C.
- 2010 University of North Carolina, Army Strategic Leadership Development Program-Intermediate, Chapel Hill, North Carolina

== Assignments ==
1. June 1972 – June 1973, Platoon Leader, Company A, 1st Battalion, 119th Infantry, Wilson, North Carolina
2. June 1973 – August 1975, Platoon Leader (Mortar), Detachment 2, Company B (-), 1st Battalion, 119th Infantry, Woodland, North Carolina
3. August 1975 – December 1976, Platoon Leader (Rifle), Detachment 2, Company B (-), 1st Battalion, 119th Infantry, Woodland, North Carolina
4. December 1976 – February 1979, Executive Officer, Company B (-), 1st Battalion, 119th Infantry, Williamston, North Carolina
5. February 1979 – November 1982, Commander, Company B (-), 1st Battalion, 119th Infantry, Williamston, North Carolina
6. December 1982 – July 1984, S-3 Air, 1st Battalion, 119th Infantry, Ahoskie, North Carolina
7. August 1984 – December 1985, S-4, 1st Battalion, 119th Infantry, Ahoskie, North Carolina
8. January 1986 – March 1988, S-3, 1st Battalion, 119th Infantry, Ahoskie, North Carolina
9. March 1988 – July 1991, Assistant S-3, 30th Infantry Brigade (Mechanized) (Separate), Clinton, North Carolina
10. August 1991 – February 1995, Commander, 1st Battalion, 119th Infantry, Ahoskie, North Carolina
11. February 1995 – April 1997, Rear Operations Officer, 139th Support Detachment, Morrisville, North Carolina
12. May 1997 – August 1997, Commander, 139th Support Detachment, Morrisville, North Carolina
13. August 1997 – February 1998, Commander, Task Force Pershing, Camp Sava North, Slavonski Brod, Croatia
14. February 1998 – July 1998, Commander, 139th Support Detachment, Morrisville, North Carolina
15. August 1998 – February 1999, Commander, 60th Troop Command, Rocky Mount, North Carolina
16. February 1999 – May 1999, Chief of Staff, United Nations Preventative Deployment (UNPREDEP), Skopje, Macedonia
17. May 1999 – August 1999, Commander, Task Force Sabre, Camp Able Sentry, Petrovec, Macedonia
18. August 1999 – October 1999, Commander, 60th Troop Command, Rocky Mount, North Carolina
19. October 1999 – July 2001, State Training Officer, Headquarters, State Area Regional Command, Raleigh, North Carolina
20. July 2001 – September 2010, The Adjutant General, North Carolina, Joint Force Headquarters, Raleigh, North Carolina
21. October 2010 – November 2011, Special Assistant to the Vice Chief of Staff, Army, Pentagon, Washington, District of Columbia
22. November 2011 – January, 2014, Director, Army National Guard, Pentagon, Washington, District of Columbia

== Awards and decorations ==
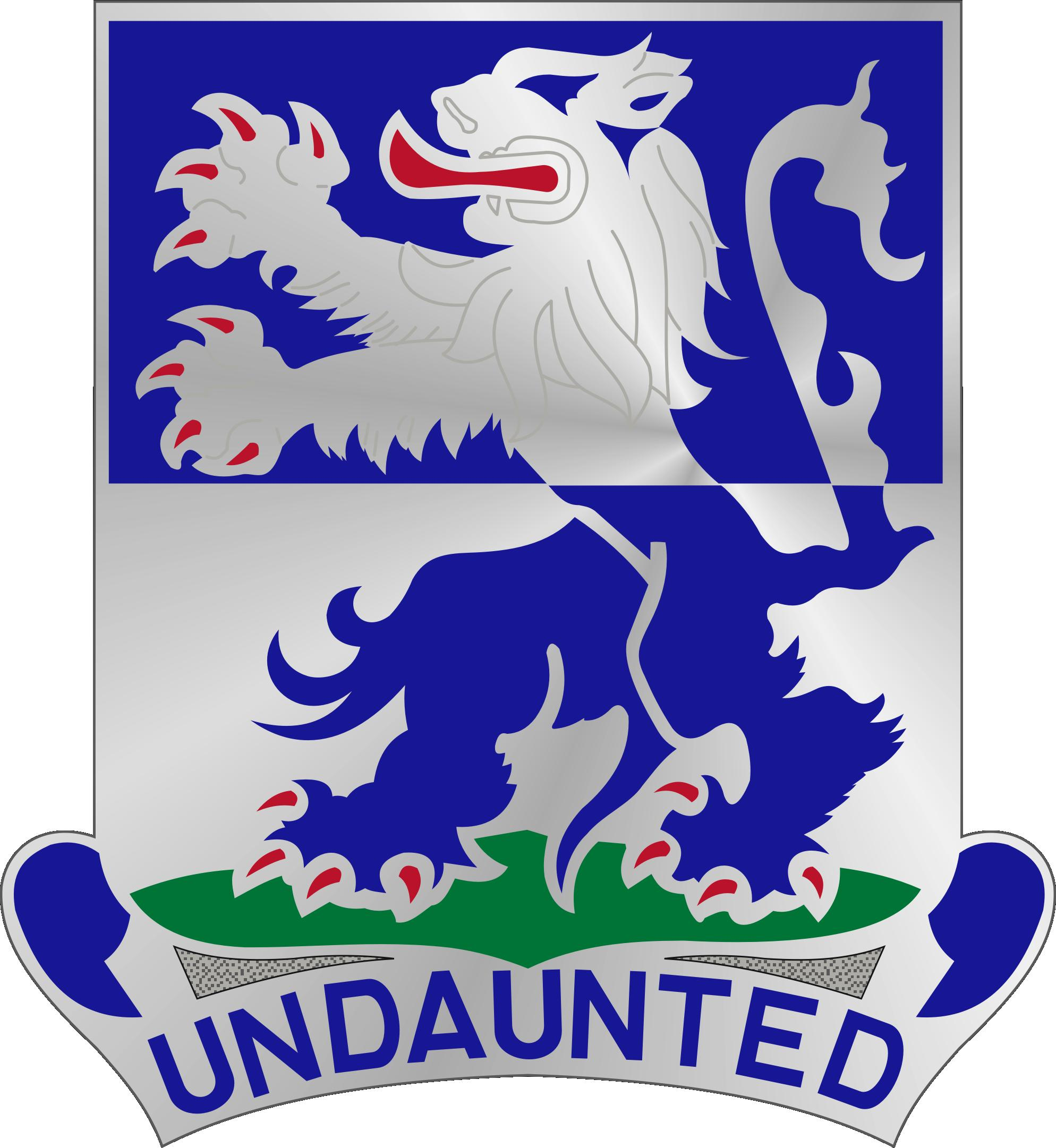
Air Assault Badge
Army Staff Identification Badge
119th Infantry Regiment Distinctive Unit Insignia

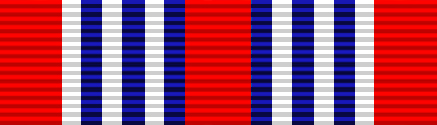
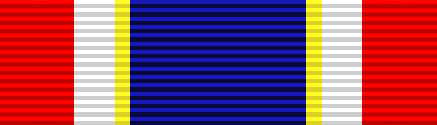
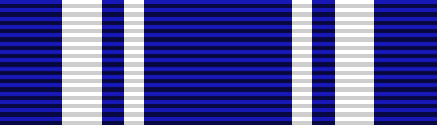
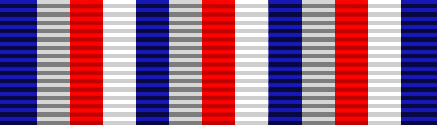
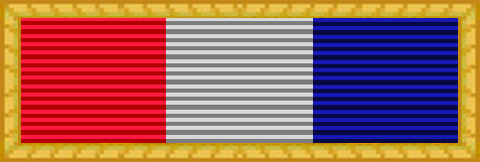
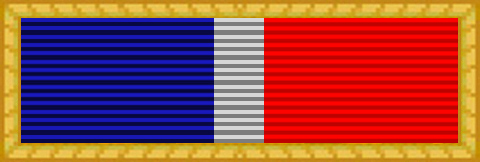
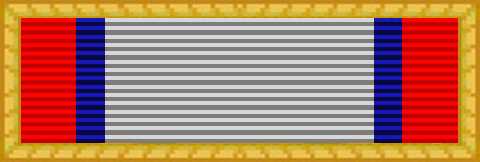
Army Distinguished Service Medal with one bronze oak leaf cluster
Legion of Merit
Meritorious Service Medal with three oak leaf clusters
Army Commendation Medal with one oak leaf clusters
Army Achievement Medal
Army Superior Unit Award
Army Reserve Components Achievement Medal with one silver and two bronze oak leaf clusters
National Defense Service Medal with two bronze service stars
Armed Forces Expeditionary Medal
Kosovo Campaign Medal (with 2 Service Stars)
Global War on Terrorism Service Medal
Armed Forces Service Medal
Humanitarian Service Medal
Armed Forces Reserve Medal with Gold Hourglass and "M" Device
Army Service Ribbon
Army Reserve Components Overseas Training Ribbon with bronze award numeral 9
UNPREDEP – Preventive Deployment Force
NATO Medal for Yugoslavia, 1 bronze service star
The Brotherhood of Arms Award (Republic of Moldova)
Unidentified
North Carolina Commendation Medal
North Carolina Achievement Medal
North Carolina State Active Duty Ribbon
North Carolina Service Ribbon
North Carolina Governor's Unit Citation
North Carolina Meritorious Unit Citation
North Carolina Outstanding Unit Award

== Additional accomplishments ==
- Order of Saint Maurice, National Infantry Association
- Order of the Long Leaf Pine, Governor of North Carolina

== Effective dates of promotions ==
Insignia	Rank	Date
	Lieutenant General	November 14, 2011
	Major General	June 27, 2003
	Brigadier General	July 16, 2001
	Colonel	May 2, 1997
	Lieutenant Colonel	August 1, 1991
	Major	January 31, 1986
	Captain	May 4, 1979
	First Lieutenant	June 23, 1975
	Second Lieutenant	September 24, 1972

Military offices
Preceded by Gerald A. Rudisil Jr.	Adjutant General of North Carolina; 2001–2010	Succeeded by Gregory A. Lusk
Preceded by Raymond W. Carpenter; Acting	Director of the Army National Guard; 2011–2014	Succeeded by Judd H. Lyons
