= Timothy J. Kadavy =

United States general

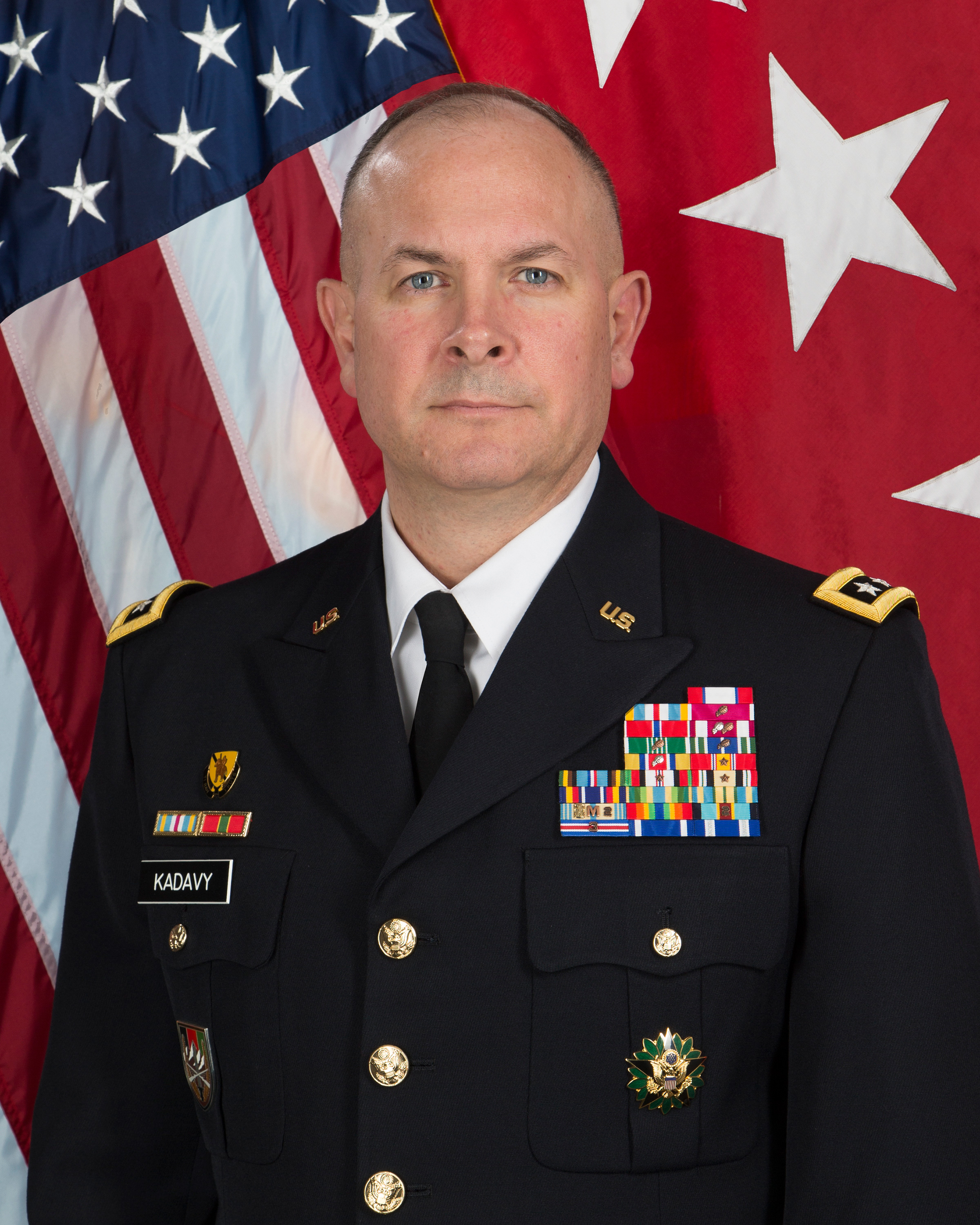
- Lieutenant General Timothy J. Kadavy
- Born: November 25, 1963 (age 62); Lincoln, Nebraska, U.S.
- Military career
- Allegiance: United States
- Branch: United States Army; Army National Guard
- Service years: 1984–2020
- Rank: Lieutenant General
- Commands: Army National Guard; Combined Joint Inter Agency Task Force-Afghanistan; Nebraska National Guard; 1st Squadron, 167th Cavalry
- Conflicts: Operation Joint Forge; Iraq War; War in Afghanistan
- Awards: Defense Distinguished Service Medal; Army Distinguished Service Medal (2); Defense Superior Service Medal; Legion of Merit (2); Bronze Star Medal

Signature
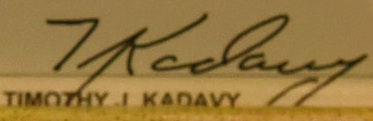

Timothy James Kadavy (born November 25, 1963) is a retired United States Army lieutenant general, who served as the 20th director of the Army National Guard from March 27, 2015, to March 25, 2019. He previously served as the special assistant to the vice chief of the National Guard Bureau, the adjutant general of the Nebraska National Guard, deputy director of the Army National Guard, and as the commander of Combined Joint Inter Agency Task Force-Afghanistan, which was part of the NATO International Security Assistance Force mission in that country. Kadavy was nominated by the President to become the Vice Chief of the National Guard Bureau with the rank of lieutenant general, on March 5, 2019. The Senate returned his nomination to the president without action on January 3, 2020. After leaving his assignment as the director of the Army National Guard, he served as a two-star special assistant to the chief of the National Guard Bureau from May 23, 2019, until his retirement on August 3, 2020. He retired from the Army with the rank of lieutenant general after over 36 years of service.

== Early life ==
Timothy James Kadavy was born in Lincoln, Nebraska, on November 25, 1963, the son of Leo I. Kadavy and Rose Bohaty Kadavy. He graduated from Omaha's Millard South High School in 1982 and enlisted in the Nebraska Army National Guard. He received his commission as a second lieutenant of Armor from the Reserve Officers' Training Corps program at the University of Nebraska–Lincoln in 1987.

== Military career ==
Kadavy began his officer career as a platoon leader in the Nebraska Army National Guard's Troop A, 1st Squadron, 167th Cavalry Regiment. His subsequent assignments through May 1994 included: executive officer of Troop B, 1-167th Cavalry; liaison officer, Headquarters, 1-167th Cavalry; assistant operations and training officer (S3 Air), Headquarters, 1-167th Cavalry; and commander, Troop B, 1-167th Cavalry, and personnel staff officer (S1), 1-167th Cavalry.

From May 1994 to August 2001, Kadavy carried out staff assignments at Fifth United States Army; United States Army Forces Command; and the Army National Guard staff at the National Guard Bureau. From September 2001 through September 2003, he was commander of 1st Squadron, 167th Cavalry, including deployment to Bosnia-Herzegovina for Operation Joint Forge.

From September 2003 to June 2004, Kadavy was a student in the United States Army War College's Fellowship Program at the Drug Enforcement Administration. From July 2004 to March 2006, he served as Chief of Plans, Readiness and Mobilization for the Army National Guard. He then served in Iraq from April to September 2006, as Chief of the Reserve Component Division for Multi-National Corps – Iraq. From September 2006 to October 2007, Kadavy was assigned as operations and training officer (G3) for the Army National Guard.

=== General Officer ===
In November 2007, Kadavy was selected for appointment as the adjutant general of the Nebraska National Guard, succeeding Roger P. Lempke, and received a state promotion to brigadier general. He was federally recognized as a brigadier general in January 2009.

Kadavy was named deputy director of the Army National Guard in August 2009. He was promoted to major general in December 2010.

In January 2013, Kadavy was announced as the next commander of Combined Joint Inter Agency Task Force-Afghanistan (CJIATF-A). He was replaced on an interim basis by Brigadier General Walter E. Fountain, and began his new duties in April 2013.

In May 2013, Major General Judd H. Lyons, Kadavy's successor as adjutant general of the Nebraska National Guard in 2009, was announced as the next deputy director of the Army National Guard. He assumed those duties in July 2013.

In March 2014, Kadavy returned from Afghanistan and began an assignment as special assistant to the vice chief of the National Guard Bureau.

On March 10, 2015, Kadavy was nominated by President Obama to become the next director of the Army National Guard, with appointment to the rank of lieutenant general in the active duty reserve of the Army. He was confirmed by the United States Senate on March 27, and promoted in a ceremony on April 14.

In March 2019, the president nominated Kadavy for appointment as vice chief of the National Guard Bureau, and Vice Chief Daniel R. Hokanson was nominated to succeed Kadavy as director of the Army National Guard. In March 2019, Kadavy was reassigned as a special assistant to the National Guard Bureau chief at his permanent two-star rank of major general while awaiting Senate confirmation, to allow Hokanson to take over as Army Guard director. The Senate returned Kadavy's nomination to the president without action on January 3, 2020. Kadavy retired as a lieutenant general on August 3, 2020. At his retirement he received several awards, including a second award of the Army Distinguished Service Medal.

== Education ==
- 1987 Bachelor of Science degree in business administration, University of Nebraska–Lincoln, Lincoln, Nebraska
- 1996 Master of Arts degree in procurement and acquisitions management, Webster University, Saint Louis, Missouri
- 2004 Drug Enforcement Administration Fellowship, United States Army War College, Washington, D.C.
- 2008 Joint and Combined Warfighting School (JPME-II), National Defense University, Norfolk, Virginia
- 2010 CAPSTONE, Fort Lesley J. McNair, National Defense University, Washington, D.C.
- 2012 Joint Flag Officer Warfighting Course, Maxwell Air Force Base, Alabama

== Awards and decorations ==
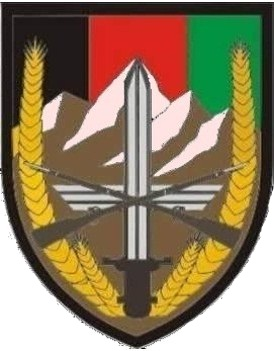
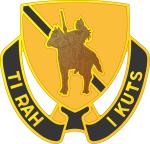
Army Staff Identification Badge
United States Forces - Afghanistan Combat Service Identification Badge
167th Cavalry Regiment Distinctive Unit Insignia
3 Overseas Service Bars

Defense Distinguished Service Medal
Army Distinguished Service Medal with oak leaf cluster
Defense Superior Service Medal
Legion of Merit with one bronze oak leaf cluster
Bronze Star Medal
Meritorious Service Medal with six oak leaf clusters
Army Commendation Medal with oak leaf cluster
Army Achievement Medal with oak leaf cluster
Joint Meritorious Unit Award with oak leaf cluster
Army Superior Unit Award
Army Reserve Components Achievement Medal with silver oak leaf cluster
National Defense Service Medal with one bronze service star
Armed Forces Expeditionary Medal
Afghanistan Campaign Medal with one campaign star
Iraq Campaign Medal with one campaign star
Global War on Terrorism Service Medal
Armed Forces Service Medal
Military Outstanding Volunteer Service Medal
Armed Forces Reserve Medal with gold Hourglass, "M" Device and bronze award numeral 2
Army Service Ribbon
Army Overseas Service Ribbon with award numeral 2
Army Reserve Components Overseas Training Ribbon with award numeral 3
NATO Medal for the former Yugoslavia with service star

== Chronological list of assignments ==
1. December 1984 – April 1988, Platoon Leader, Alpha Troop, 1st Squadron, 167th Cavalry, Nebraska Army National Guard, Fremont, Nebraska
2. April 1988 – December 1989, Executive Officer, Bravo Troop, 1st Squadron, 167th Cavalry, Nebraska Army National Guard, Omaha, Nebraska
3. December 1989 – October 1990, Liaison Officer, 1st Squadron, 167th Cavalry, Nebraska Army National Guard, Lincoln, Nebraska
4. October 1990 – June 1991, S-3 Air, 1st Squadron, 167th Cavalry, Nebraska Army National Guard, Lincoln, Nebraska
5. June 1991 – December 1993, Commander, Bravo Troop, 1st Squadron, 167th Cavalry, Nebraska Army National Guard, Omaha, Nebraska
6. December 1993 – May 1994, Personnel Officer, 1st Squadron, 167th Cavalry, Nebraska Army National Guard, Lincoln, Nebraska
7. May 1994 – December 1996, Operations Officer, Operational Readiness Evaluations, Headquarters, Fifth United States Army, Fort Sam Houston, Texas
8. January 1997 – June 1998, Executive Officer, Deputy Commanding General (Reserve Component), United States Army Forces Command, Fort McPherson, Georgia
9. July 1998 – March 2000, Program Fielding Officer, Army National Guard Distributive Training Technology Program, Arlington, Virginia
10. April 2000 – August 2001, Branch Chief, Policy and Reporting, Readiness Branch, Army National Guard, Arlington, Virginia
11. September 2001 – October 2002, Commander, 1st Squadron, 167th Cavalry, Nebraska Army National Guard, Lincoln, Nebraska
12. November 2002 – September 2003, Task Force Commander, 1st Squadron, 167th Cavalry, Fort Riley, Kansas/Camp McGovern, Bosnia-Herzegovina
13. September 2003 – June 2004, Student, Army War College Fellowship Program, Headquarters, Drug Enforcement Administration, Washington, D.C.
14. July 2004 – March 2006, Chief, Plans Readiness and Mobilization, Army National Guard, Arlington, Virginia
15. April 2006 – September 2006, Chief, Reserve Component Support Division, Multi-National Corps-Iraq, Camp Victory, Baghdad, Iraq
16. September 2006 – October 2007, G3, Army National Guard, Arlington, Virginia
17. November 2007 – August 2009, The Adjutant General, Joint Force Headquarters, Nebraska National Guard, Lincoln, Nebraska
18. August 2009 – March 2013, deputy director, Army National Guard, Arlington, Virginia
19. April 2013 – March 2014, Commander, Combined Joint Inter Agency Task Force-Afghanistan (CJIATF-A), Kabul, Afghanistan
20. March 2014 – March 2015, Special Assistant to the Vice Chief of the National Guard Bureau, The Pentagon, Washington, D.C.
21. March 2015 – March 2019 Director of the Army National Guard, Arlington, Virginia
22. March 2019 – August 2020 Special Assistant to the Chief of the National Guard Bureau, Arlington, Virginia

== Effective dates of ranks ==
- Lieutenant General, August 3, 2020 (retired list)
- Major General, May 23, 2019 (reverted)
- Lieutenant General, March 27, 2015
- Major General, December 22, 2010
- Brigadier General, January 29, 2009
- Colonel July 28, 2004
- Lieutenant Colonel, February 25, 2000
- Major August 9, 1995
- Captain, October 10, 1990
- First Lieutenant, May 11, 1987
- Second Lieutenant, May 12, 1984
